= C18H16O8 =

The molecular formula C_{18}H_{16}O_{8} (molar mass : 360.31 g/mol, exact mass : 360.084517 u) may refer to:

- Arcapillin, a flavone
- Centaureidin, a flavonol
- Irigenin, an isoflavone
- Jaceidin, a flavonol
- Rosmarinic acid, a hydroxycinnamic acid ester
