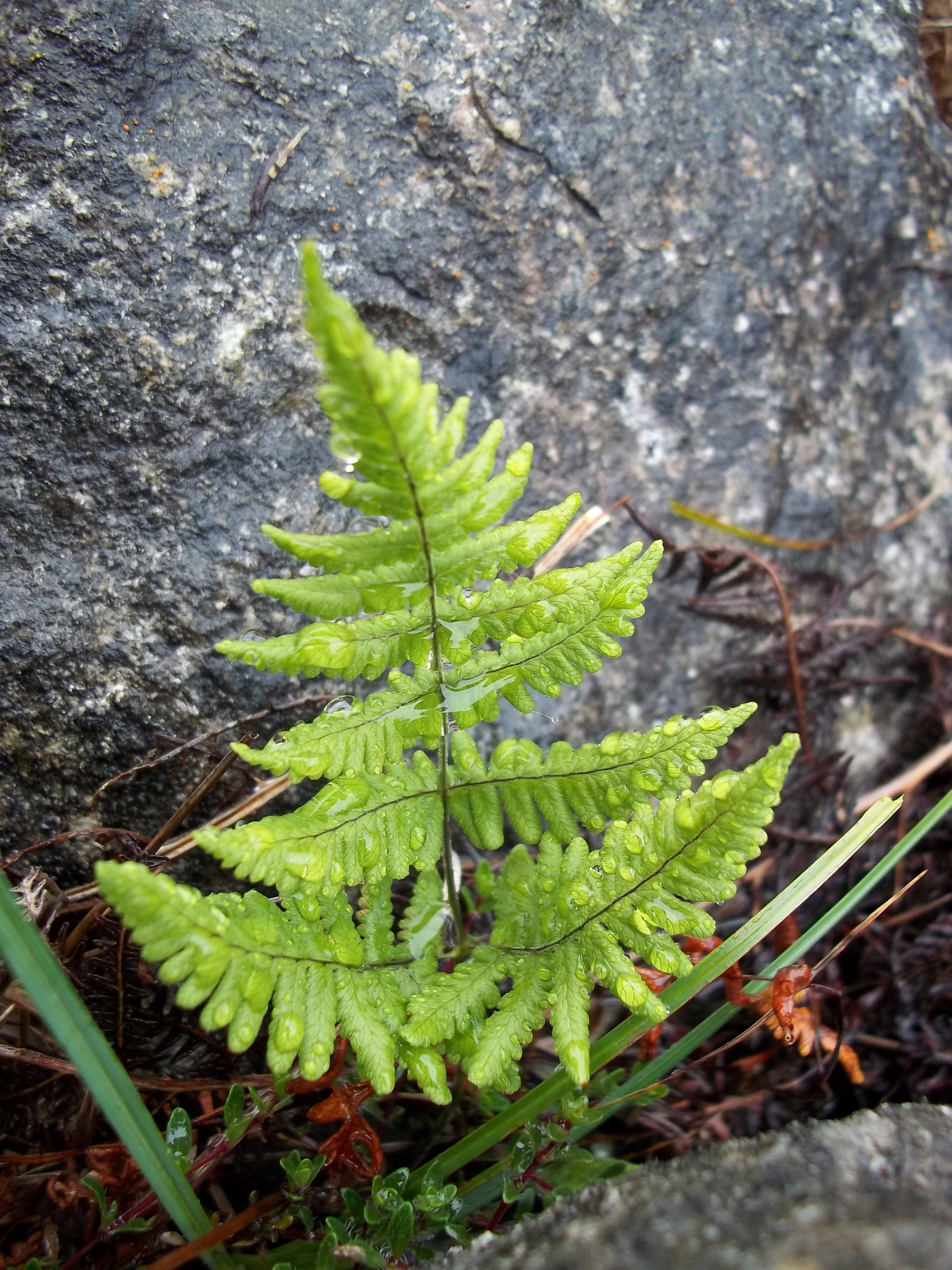

Scientific classification
- Kingdom: Plantae
- Clade: Tracheophytes
- Division: Polypodiophyta
- Class: Polypodiopsida
- Order: Polypodiales
- Suborder: Aspleniineae
- Family: Cystopteridaceae
- Genus: Gymnocarpium
- Species: G. robertianum

Binomial name
- Gymnocarpium robertianum (Hoffm.) Newman

Synonyms
- Dryopteris robertiana (Hoffm.) C. Chr. Gymnocarpium dryopteris (L.) Newman var. pumilum (DC.) B.Boivin; Phegopteris robertiana (Hoffm.)A. Braun ex Asch.

= Gymnocarpium robertianum =

Species of fern

Gymnocarpium robertianum, the limestone fern or scented oakfern, is a fern of the family Cystopteridaceae.

== Description ==
Gymnocarpium robertianum has small (10–50 cm), deltate, two- to three-pinnate fronds. Fronds arise from creeping rhizomes and have long, delicate rachis. The sori are borne in round clumps on the underside of the blade and lack an indusium. This species differs from the closely related G. dryopteris in having a densely glandular rachis as well as a more sparsely glandular underside to the blade.

Gymnocarpium robertianum is thought to hybridise with G. appalachianum giving rise to Gymnocarpium × heterosporum W. H. Wagner. This hybrid was only known from Pennsylvania where it has now been eradicated. The hybrid between G. robertianum and G. dryopteris is called Gymnocarpium × achriosporum Sarvela. This taxon is known from Sweden and Quebec.

=== Phytochemistry ===
The exudate secreted by the glandular hairs of G. robertianum is composed of a mixture of flavonoids. Apigenin, apigenin-7-methyl ether, apigenin-4'-methyl ether, apigenin-4',7-dimethyl ether, kaempferol, kaempferol-3-methyl ether, kaempferol-4'-methyl ether, kaempferol-3,4'-dimethyl ether, kaempferol-3,4',7-trimethyl ether and the unusual herbacetin-3,4',8-trimethyl ether.

== Distribution and habitat ==
Gymnocarpium robertianum is a circumboreal species with populations in Europe, North America and the Caucasus Mountains.

This species is protected in Illinois and Michigan and is protected under the Flora Protection Order in Ireland.

This species is a calcicole and as such is restricted to alkaline rich areas. In the British Isles its preferential habitat is grykes in limestone pavement. In Michigan the species is most frequent in Thuja occidentalis swamps.
