= S. fruticosus =

S. fruticosus may refer to:

- Siphocampylus fruticosus, a plant species endemic to Ecuador
- Smallanthus fruticosus, a plant species
