= P. fruticosa =

P. fruticosa may refer to:

- Prunus fruticosa, the European dwarf cherry, dwarf cherry, Mongolian cherry or steppe cherry, a shrub species

== Synonyms ==
- Polymnia fruticosa, a synonym for Smallanthus fruticosus, a plant species
- Potentilla fruticosa or Pentaphylloides fruticosa, synonyms for Dasiphora fruticosa, the shrubby cinquefoil, a shrub species native to the cool temperate to subarctic regions of the Northern Hemisphere
