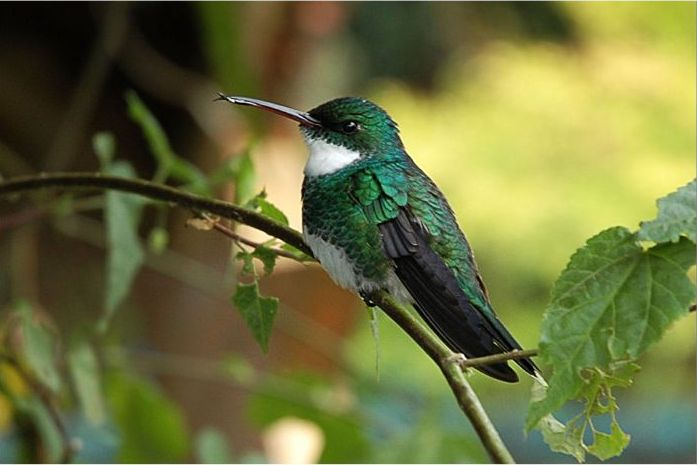

Conservation status
- Least Concern (IUCN 3.1)
- CITES Appendix II (CITES)

Scientific classification
- Kingdom: Animalia
- Phylum: Chordata
- Class: Aves
- Clade: Strisores
- Order: Apodiformes
- Family: Trochilidae
- Tribe: Trochilini
- Genus: Leucochloris; Reichenbach, 1854
- Species: L. albicollis

Binomial name
- Leucochloris albicollis (Vieillot, 1818)

= White-throated hummingbird =

The white-throated hummingbird (Leucochloris albicollis) is a species of hummingbird in the "emeralds", tribe Trochilini of subfamily Trochilinae. It is found in Argentina, Brazil, Paraguay, and Uruguay.

== Taxonomy and systematics ==
French ornithologist Louis Pierre Vieillot described the white-throated hummingbird in 1818 as Trochilus albicollis. Its species name is derived from the Latin words albus "white" and collum "neck". Ludwig Reichenbach erected the genus Leucochloris in 1854, deriving the name from the Ancient Greek leukos "white" and chloros "green".

The white-throated hummingbird is the only member of its genus and has no subspecies.

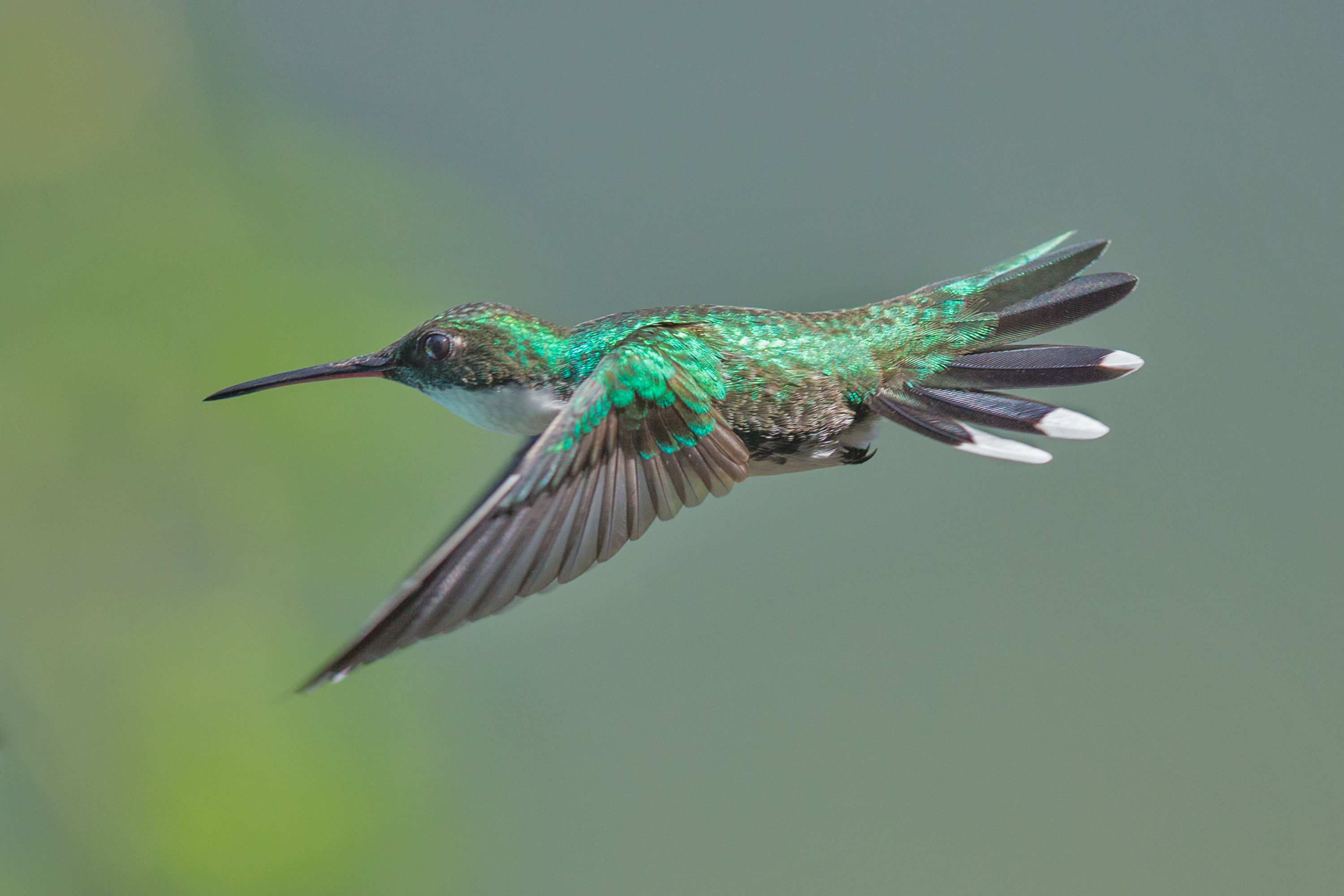

== Description ==
The white-throated hummingbird is 10 to 11.5 cm (3.9 to 4.5 in) long. Males weigh 5 to 8 g (0.18 to 0.28 oz) and females about 4.5 g (0.16 oz). Adults have a medium length, straight, bill with a blackish maxilla and red mandible with a black tip. Adult males have golden- to bronze-green upperparts. Their uppertail coverts and inner tail feathers are golden-green to brilliant green and the outer tail feathers blackish green with white bands near the end. Their chin feathers are brilliant green with white edges, their throat white, and their cheeks and breast brilliant green to golden-green. The center of their belly is white with golden- to bronze-green sides and flanks. Their undertail coverts are white with some bronze-green to brownish inclusions. Adult females are very similar but duller, less glittery, overall. Juveniles have grayish brown underparts with less white and brownish tips to the tail feathers.

== Distribution and habitat ==
The white-throated hummingbird is found in eastern Paraguay, southeastern Brazil from Minas Gerais and Espírito Santo south, Uruguay, and northeastern Argentina. It inhabits semi-open to open landscapes such as the edges of mature forest, marshes, scrublands, parks, and gardens. In elevation it is generally found from near sea level to 1,000 m (3,300 ft) but there are occasional records higher with one at 2,100 m (6,900 ft).

== Behavior ==
=== Movement ===
The white-throated hummingbird is mostly sedentary but some local dispersal has been noted.

=== Feeding ===
The white-throated hummingbird forages for nectar at a very wide variety of native and introduced plants. Species from at least 10 families have been documented as sources. Bromeliaceae seem especially favored; examples include Quesnelia testudo and Tillandsia aeranthos. It is known to pollinate Siphocampylus sulfureus. In addition to nectar it feeds on insects captured by hawking from a perch.

=== Breeding ===
The white-throated hummingbird's breeding season spans from October to March. It makes a cup nest of plant down and moss bound with spiderweb with lichen on the outside. It is typically placed on a horizontal branch of a shrub or small tree. The female incubates the clutch of two eggs for about 14 days and fledging occurs 20 to 25 days after hatch.

=== Vocalization ===
The white-throated hummingbird's song is "a series of 4–10 high-pitched, buzzy notes, with emphasis on the first, 'bzeeeee-bzee-bzee-bzee-bzee'." It also makes calls described as "dry chips and a high-pitched descending metallic rattle."

== Status ==
The IUCN has assessed the white-throated hummingbird as being of Least Concern, though its population size and trend are not known. No immediate threats have been identified. It is considered "especially common" in the southeastern part of its range and "widely adapted to man-made habitats". Its status at the western margin of its range is less well known.
