= Santin =

Santin may refer to:

- Santin (flavonol), a methylated flavonol

People

- Alessandro Santin (born 1958), an Italian race car driver
- Damían Santín (born 1980), a Uruguayan football player
- César Santin (born 1981), a Brazilian football player
- Guido Santin (1911–2008), an Italian rower who competed in the 1936 Summer Olympics
- Sergio Santín (born 1956), a retired football player from Uruguay

Places

- Saint-Santin, a commune in the Aveyron department in southern France
- Saint-Santin-Cantalès, a commune in the Cantal department in south-central France
- Saint-Santin-de-Maurs, a commune in the Cantal department in south-central France
