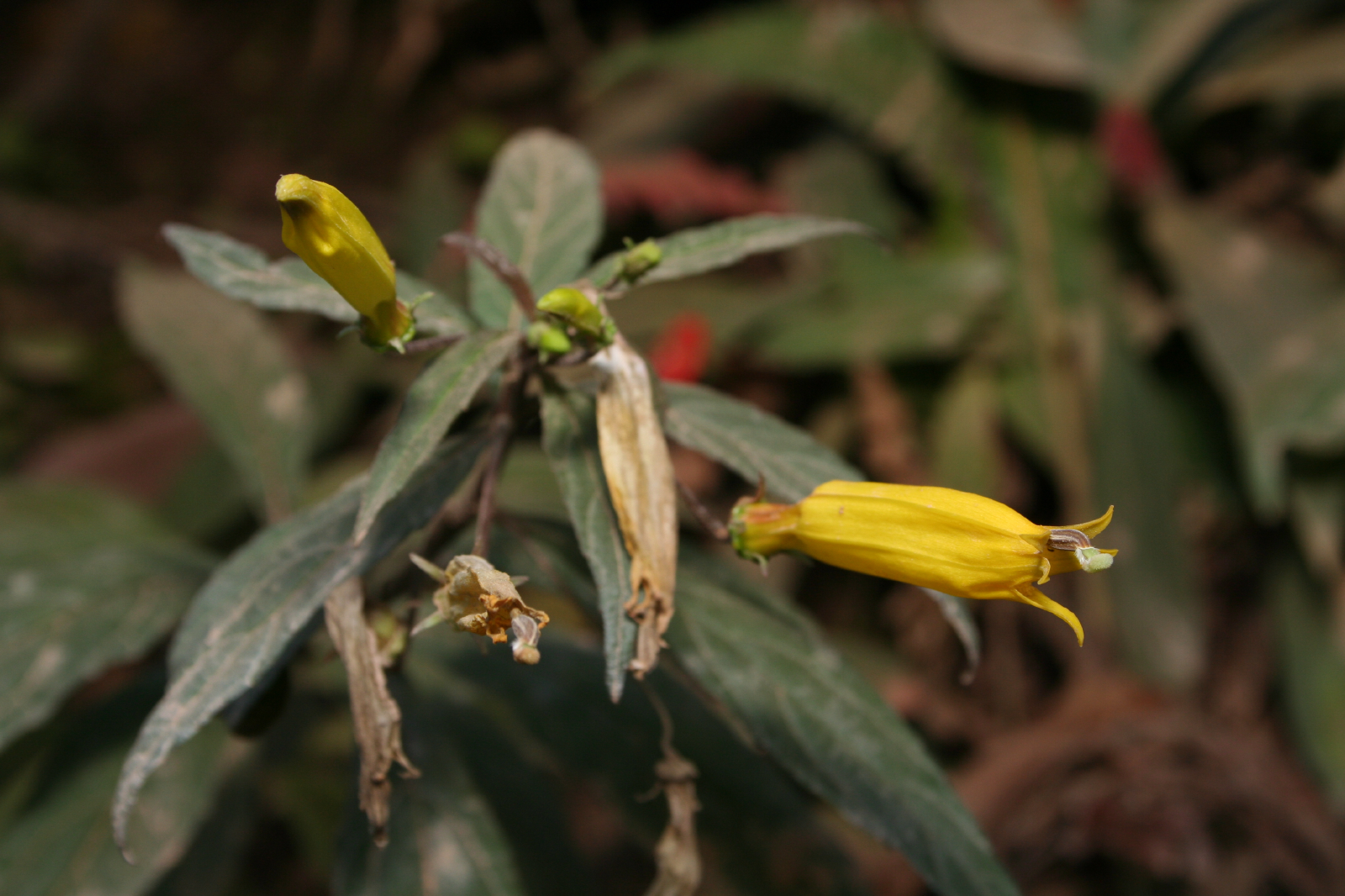
- Siphocampylus aureus

Scientific classification
- Kingdom: Plantae
- Clade: Tracheophytes
- Clade: Angiosperms
- Clade: Eudicots
- Clade: Asterids
- Order: Asterales
- Family: Campanulaceae
- Subfamily: Lobelioideae
- Genus: Siphocampylus

= Siphocampylus =

Genus of flowering plants

Siphocampylus is a genus of flowering plants in the family Campanulaceae. There are approximately 221 species native to the Neotropical realm. Most grow in mountain habitat.

Species include:

- Siphocampylus affinis (Mirb.) McVaugh
- Siphocampylus asplundii Jeppesen
- Siphocampylus ecuadoriensis E.Wimm.
- Siphocampylus fruticosus E.Wimm.
- Siphocampylus furax E.Wimm.
- Siphocampylus humboldtianus C.Presl ex A.DC.
- Siphocampylus loxensis (Willd. ex Schult.) Vatke ex E.Wimm.
- Siphocampylus lucidus E.Wimm.
- Siphocampylus rostratus E.Wimm.
- Siphocampylus rupestris E.Wimm.
- Siphocampylus scandens (Kunth) G.Don
- Siphocampylus sulfureus E.Wimm.
- Siphocampylus uncipes McVaugh
