= Siphocampylus furax =

Conservation status
- Endangered (IUCN 3.1)

Scientific classification
- Kingdom: Plantae
- Clade: Tracheophytes
- Clade: Angiosperms
- Clade: Eudicots
- Clade: Asterids
- Order: Asterales
- Family: Campanulaceae
- Genus: Siphocampylus
- Species: S. furax

Binomial name
- Siphocampylus furax E.Wimm.

Species of flowering plant

Siphocampylus furax is a species of plant in the family Campanulaceae. It is endemic to Ecuador.

== Distribution and habitat ==
The species is known from two subpopulations at high altitudes (2000–3500 m) in the northwestern Andes of Ecuador. It has been found growing along roadside, apparently as part of the pioneer vegetation in habitats disturbed by logging and clearing. While potentially also present in Colombia, it is not known to occur inside any of Ecuador's protected areas. Currently the only known threat to this plant is habitat destruction.
