= Gymnocarpium oyamense =

Scientific classification
- Kingdom: Plantae
- Clade: Embryophytes
- Clade: Tracheophytes
- Division: Polypodiophyta
- Class: Polypodiopsida
- Order: Polypodiales
- Suborder: Aspleniineae
- Family: Cystopteridaceae
- Genus: Gymnocarpium
- Species: G. oyamense

Binomial name
- Gymnocarpium oyamense (Baker) Ching

Synonyms
- List: Aspidium crameri Christ; Aspidium gymnogrammoides (Baker) Christ; Aspidium krameri (Franch. & Sav.) Christ; Carpogymnia oyamensis (Baker) Á.Löve & D.Löve; Currania gracilipes Copel.; Currania oyamensis (Baker) Copel.; Dryopteris genuflexa Rosenst.; Dryopteris gracilipes (Copel.) C.Chr.; Dryopteris gymnogrammoides (Baker) C.Chr.; Dryopteris oyamensis (Baker) C.Chr.; Gymnocarpium gracilipes (Copel.) Ching; Gymnocarpium oyamense var. gracilipes (Copel.) W.C.Shieh; Nephrodium gymnogrammoides (Baker) Diels; Nephrodium krameri (Franch. & Sav.) Diels; Phegopteris gymnogrammoides (Baker) Alderw.; Phegopteris krameri (Franch. & Sav.) Makino; Phegopteris oyamensis (Baker) Alderw.; Polypodium gymnogrammoides Baker; Polypodium krameri Franch. & Sav.; Polypodium oyamense Baker

Species of fern

Gymnocarpium oyamense is a species of fern in the oak-fern genus Gymnocarpium, family Aspleniaceae. It is found from Nepal to China and Japan and on to New Guinea. It has gained the Royal Horticultural Society's Award of Garden Merit as an ornamental. It grows in moist areas in forests and moss covered rocks.
