= Quesnelia violacea =

Scientific classification
- Kingdom: Plantae
- Clade: Tracheophytes
- Clade: Angiosperms
- Clade: Monocots
- Clade: Commelinids
- Order: Poales
- Family: Bromeliaceae
- Genus: Quesnelia
- Species: Q. violacea

Binomial name
- Quesnelia violacea Wand. & S.L.Proença

Species of plant

Quesnelia violacea is a species of flowering plant in the family Bromeliaceae, endemic to Brazil (southeastern São Paulo). It was first described in 2006.
