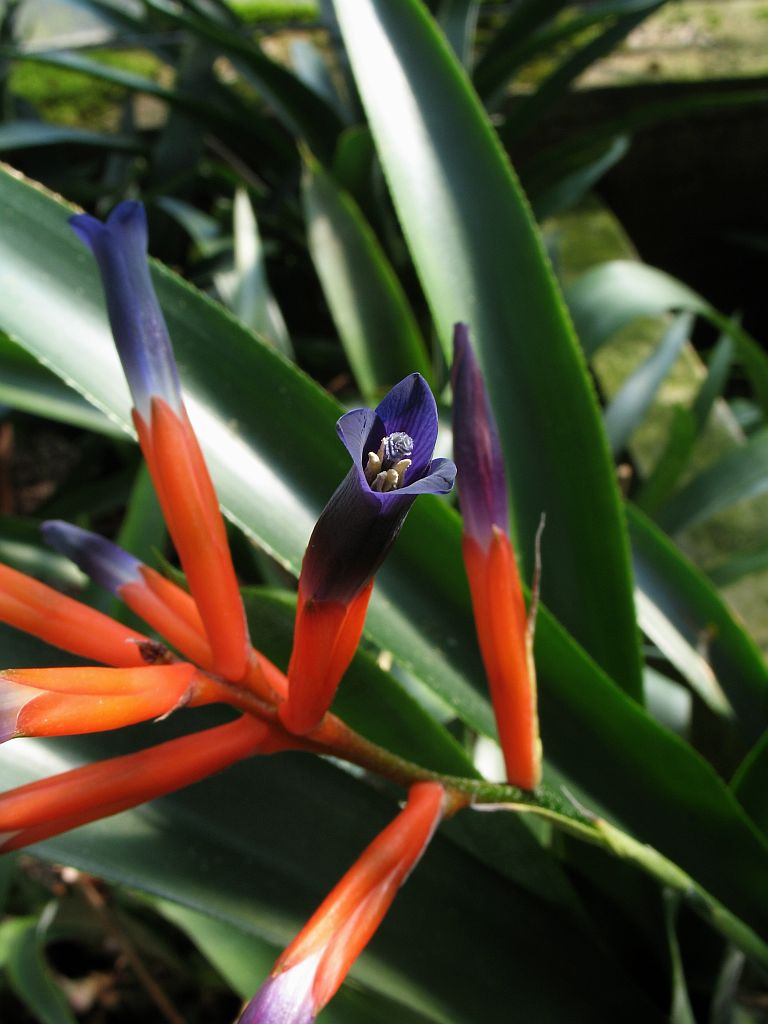

Scientific classification
- Kingdom: Plantae
- Clade: Tracheophytes
- Clade: Angiosperms
- Clade: Monocots
- Clade: Commelinids
- Order: Poales
- Family: Bromeliaceae
- Genus: Quesnelia
- Subgenus: Quesnelia subg. Billbergiopsis
- Species: Q. liboniana

Binomial name
- Quesnelia liboniana (De Jonghe) Mez

Synonyms
- Billbergia liboniana De Jonghe; Billbergia tillandsioides Baker, nom. illeg.; Quesnelia tillandsioides Mez

= Quesnelia liboniana =

Species of plant

Quesnelia liboniana is a species of flowering plant in the family Bromeliaceae, endemic to southeastern Brazil. It was first described in 1851 as Billbergia liboniana. It is found in the Atlantic Forest ecoregion of southeastern Brazil.

== See also ==
- Flora of the Atlantic Forest
- Endemic flora of Brazil
