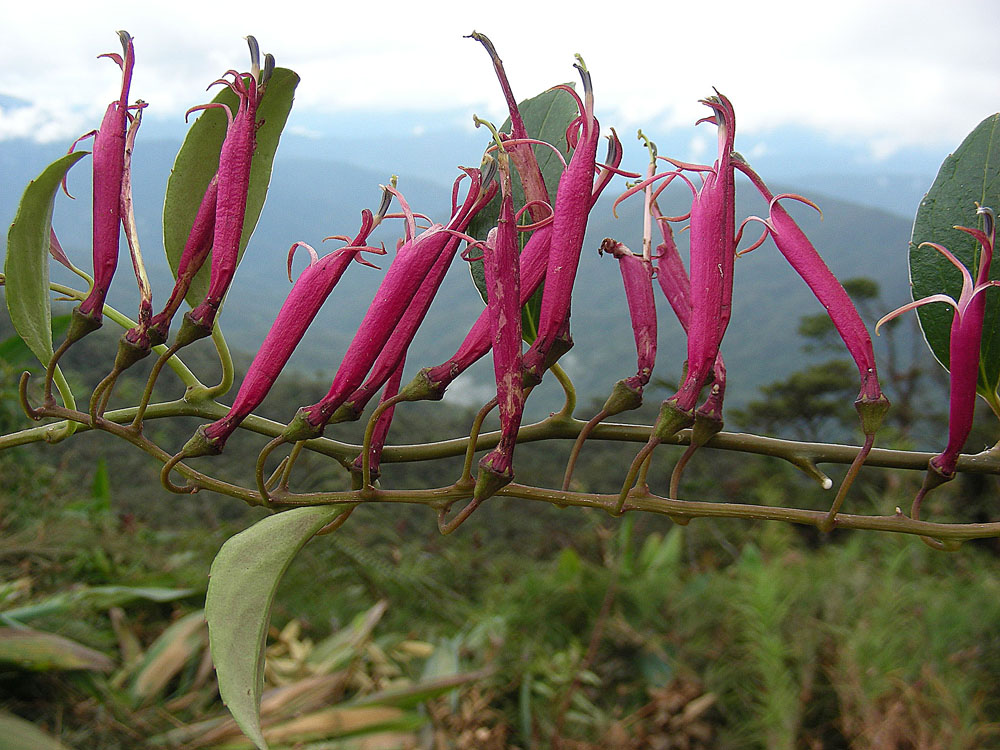
- Siphocampylus scandens flowers

Conservation status
- Least Concern (IUCN 3.1)

Scientific classification
- Kingdom: Plantae
- Clade: Tracheophytes
- Clade: Angiosperms
- Clade: Eudicots
- Clade: Asterids
- Order: Asterales
- Family: Campanulaceae
- Genus: Siphocampylus
- Species: S. scandens

Binomial name
- Siphocampylus scandens (Kunth) G.Don

= Siphocampylus scandens =

Species of flowering plant

Siphocampylus scandens is a species of plant in the family Campanulaceae. It is endemic to Ecuador and its natural habitat is subtropical or tropical moist montane forests. It is threatened by habitat loss.
