= Quesnelia dubia =

Scientific classification
- Kingdom: Plantae
- Clade: Tracheophytes
- Clade: Angiosperms
- Clade: Monocots
- Clade: Commelinids
- Order: Poales
- Family: Bromeliaceae
- Genus: Quesnelia
- Subgenus: Quesnelia subg. Billbergiopsis
- Species: Q. dubia

Binomial name
- Quesnelia dubia Leme

Species of plant

Quesnelia dubia is a species of flowering plant in the family Bromeliaceae, endemic to Brazil (the state of Bahia). It was first described in 2005. It is found in the Atlantic Forest ecoregion in southeastern Brazil.

== See also ==
- Flora of the Atlantic Forest
- Flora of Bahia
