= Quesnelia subg. Billbergiopsis =

Scientific classification
- Kingdom: Plantae
- Clade: Tracheophytes
- Clade: Angiosperms
- Clade: Monocots
- Clade: Commelinids
- Order: Poales
- Family: Bromeliaceae
- Genus: Quesnelia
- Subgenus: Quesnelia subg. Billbergiopsis; Mez

Species
- See text.

Subgenus of flowering plants

Quesnelia subg. Billbergiopsis is a subgenus of the genus Quesnelia and contains 14 of the 20 or more described species of the genus.

== Species ==
As of November 2022, the Encyclopaedia of Bromeliads placed 14 species in the subgenus:

- Quesnelia alvimii Leme
- Quesnelia augustocoburgii Wawra
- Quesnelia blanda Wawra (listed as Quesnelia strobilispica)
- Quesnelia dubia Leme
- Quesnelia edmundoi L.B.Sm.
- Quesnelia humilis Mez
- Quesnelia imbricata L.B.Sm.
- Quesnelia indecora Mez
- Quesnelia kautskyi C.Vieira
- Quesnelia lateralis Wawra
- Quesnelia liboniana (De Jonghe) Mez
- Quesnelia marmorata (Lem.) Read
- Quesnelia seideliana L.B.Sm. & Reitz
- Quesnelia vasconcelosiana Leme
