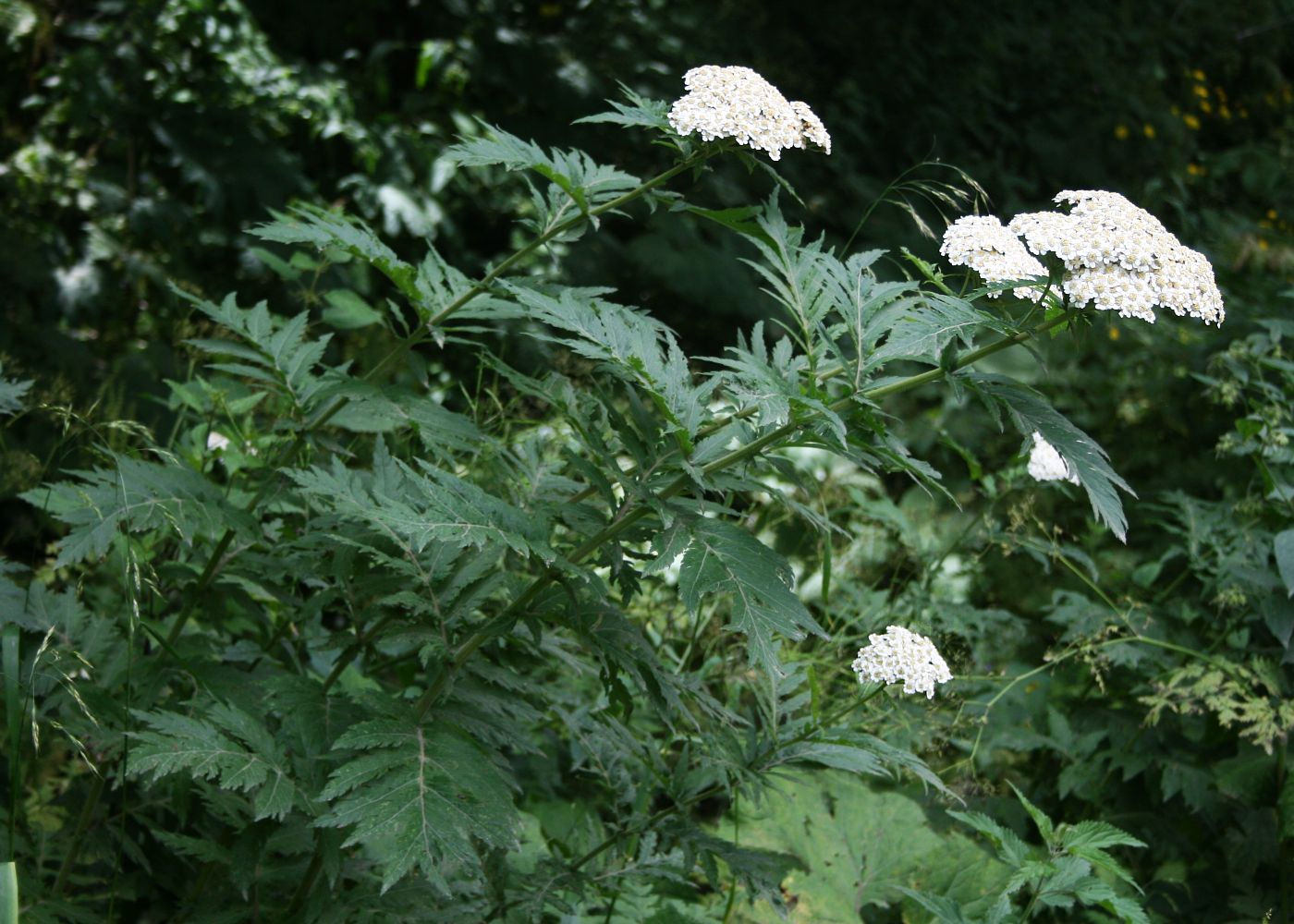

Scientific classification
- Kingdom: Plantae
- Clade: Tracheophytes
- Clade: Angiosperms
- Clade: Eudicots
- Clade: Asterids
- Order: Asterales
- Family: Asteraceae
- Genus: Tanacetum
- Species: T. microphyllum

Binomial name
- Tanacetum microphyllum DC.

= Tanacetum microphyllum =

Species of flowering plant

Tanacetum microphyllum is a species of flowering plant in the aster family, Asteraceae. It is endemic to the Iberian Peninsula.

The plant has been used for centuries in Spanish traditional medicine as an anti-inflammatory and antirheumatic. Compounds isolated from extracts of the plant include santin, ermanin, centaureidin, and hydroxyachillin.
