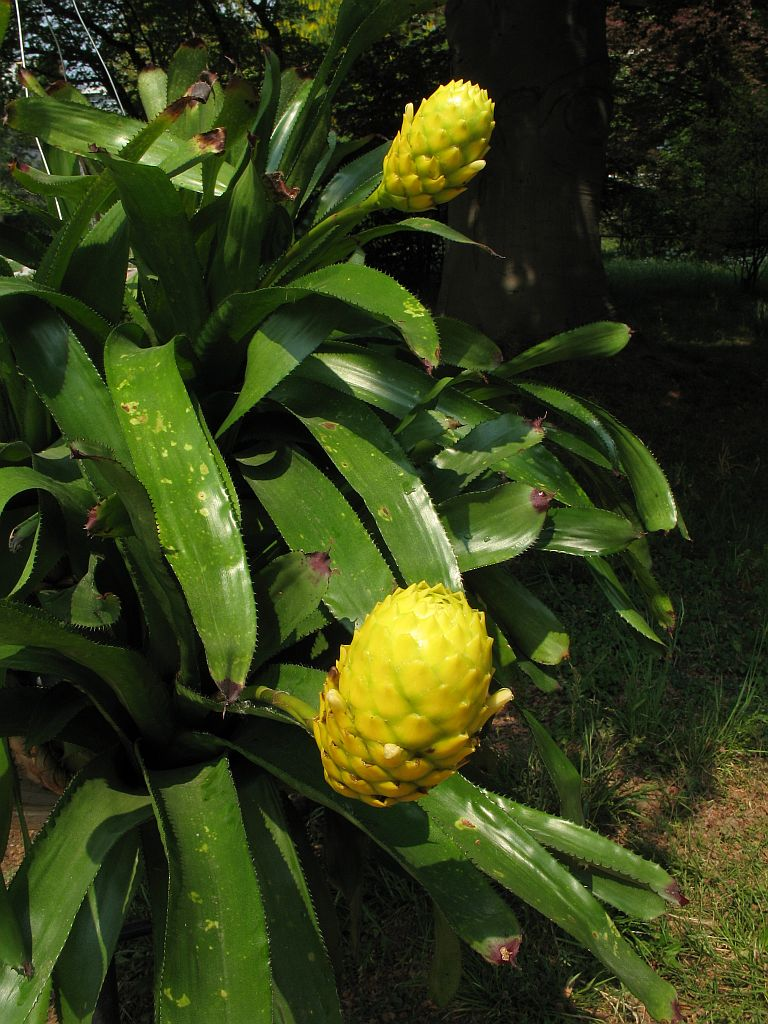

Scientific classification
- Kingdom: Plantae
- Clade: Tracheophytes
- Clade: Angiosperms
- Clade: Monocots
- Clade: Commelinids
- Order: Poales
- Family: Bromeliaceae
- Genus: Quesnelia
- Subgenus: Quesnelia subg. Billbergiopsis
- Species: Q. edmundoi

Binomial name
- Quesnelia edmundoi L.B.Sm.

= Quesnelia edmundoi =

Species of plant

Quesnelia edmundoi is a species of flowering plant in the family Bromeliaceae, endemic to Brazil. It was first described by Lyman Bradford Smith in 1851. It is found in the Atlantic Forest ecoregion only within Rio de Janeiro state, in southeastern Brazil.

== See also ==
- Flora of the Atlantic Forest
- Flora of Rio de Janeiro (state)
