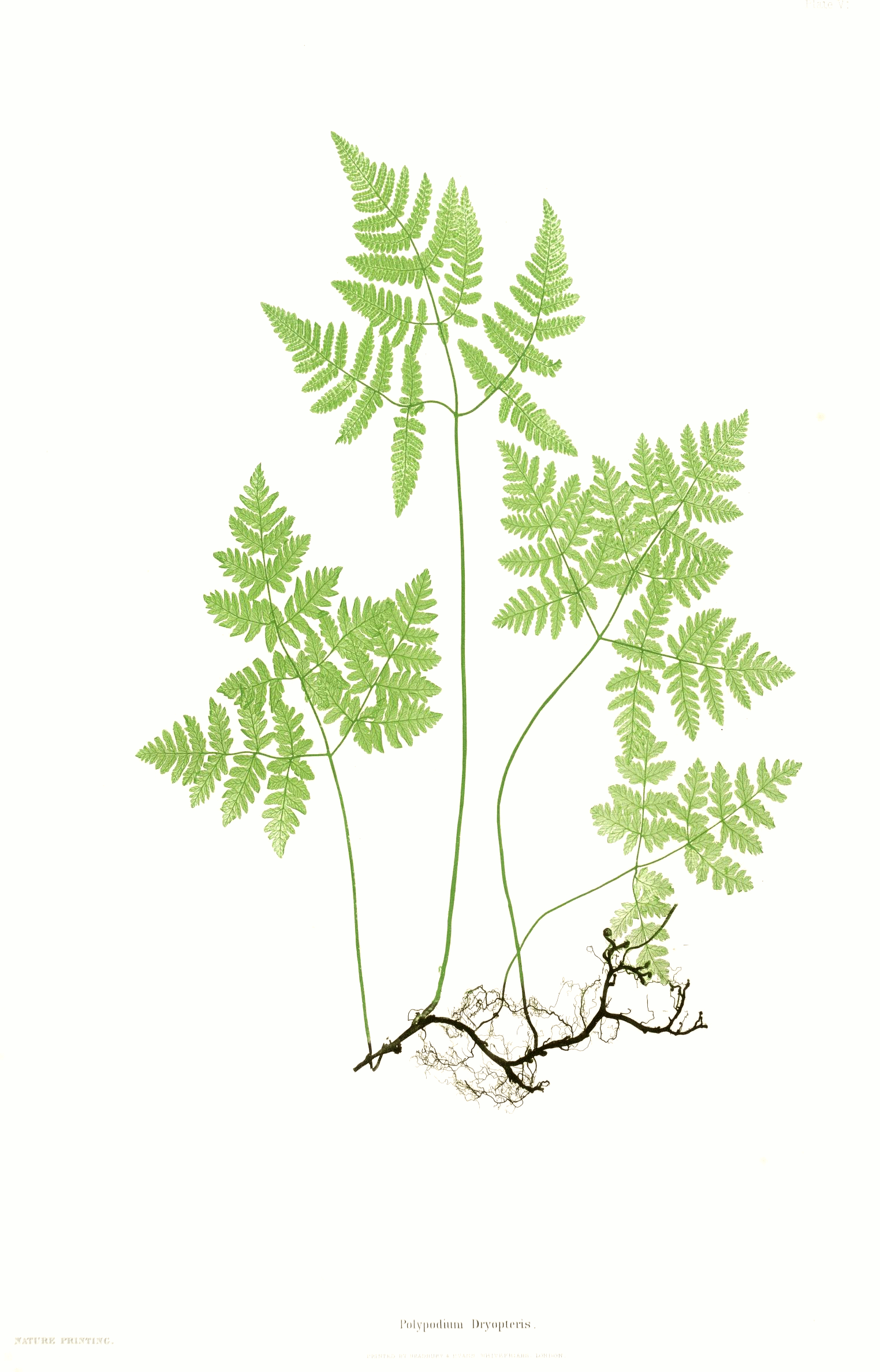

Scientific classification
- Kingdom: Plantae
- Clade: Tracheophytes
- Division: Polypodiophyta
- Class: Polypodiopsida
- Order: Polypodiales
- Suborder: Aspleniineae
- Family: Cystopteridaceae
- Genus: Gymnocarpium; Newm. 1851

Type species
- Gymnocarpium dryopteris (von Linné) Newman

Species
- See text

Synonyms
- Carpogymnia (Fuchs ex Janch.) Löve & Löve; ×Cystocarpium Fraser-Jenkins; Currania Copeland

= Gymnocarpium =

Genus of ferns

Gymnocarpium is a small genus of ferns, called oak ferns. It was once placed with various other groups, including the dryopteroid ferns and the athyrioid ferns. Cladistic analysis has demonstrated that Gymnocarpium and Cystopteris form a natural but relatively primitive clade that is basal to the asplenioid, thelypterioid, and athyrioid ferns comprehensively.

Gymnocarpium sori are small, round and naked. These ferns generally have a slender, creeping rhizome under the surface of the ground, and fairly thin-textured fronds.

== Phylogeny ==
This genus includes the following species:

Phylogeny from Fern Tree of Life

- Gymnocarpium
  - G. robertianum (Hoffm.) Newman (Limestone/scented oak fern)
  - - - ×Cystocarpium × roskamianum Fraser-Jenkins
      - - G. ×brittonianum (Sarvela) Pryer & Haufler
        - - G. disjunctum (Ruprecht) Ching (Pacific oak fern)
          - G. dryopteris (von Linné) Newman (Western/northern oak fern)
    - - G. oyamense (Baker) Ching
      - - - G. jessoense (Koidzumi) Koidzumi
          - G. remotepinnatum (Hayata) Ching
        - - G. appalachianum Pryer & Haufler (Appalachian oak fern)
          - G. continentale (Petrov) Pojark. (Nahanni oak fern)

Other species include:
- G. ×achriosporum Sarvela
- G. ×bipinnatifidum Miyam.
- G. fedtschenkoanum
- G. ×intermedium Sarvela
