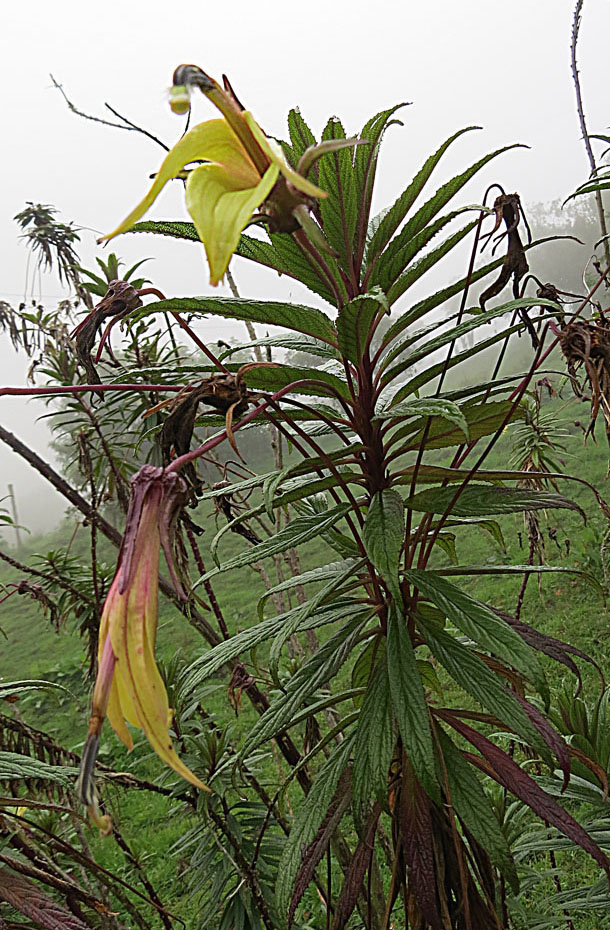
- Siphocampylus lucidus

Conservation status
- Endangered (IUCN 3.1)

Scientific classification
- Kingdom: Plantae
- Clade: Tracheophytes
- Clade: Angiosperms
- Clade: Eudicots
- Clade: Asterids
- Order: Asterales
- Family: Campanulaceae
- Genus: Siphocampylus
- Species: S. lucidus

Binomial name
- Siphocampylus lucidus E.Wimm.

= Siphocampylus lucidus =

Species of flowering plant

Siphocampylus lucidus is a species of plant in the family Campanulaceae. It is endemic to Ecuador. Its natural habitats are subtropical or tropical moist montane forests and subtropical or tropical high-altitude grassland. It is threatened by habitat loss.
