= Quesnelia imbricata =

Scientific classification
- Kingdom: Plantae
- Clade: Tracheophytes
- Clade: Angiosperms
- Clade: Monocots
- Clade: Commelinids
- Order: Poales
- Family: Bromeliaceae
- Genus: Quesnelia
- Subgenus: Quesnelia subg. Billbergiopsis
- Species: Q. imbricata

Binomial name
- Quesnelia imbricata L.B.Sm.

Synonyms

Species of plant

Quesnelia imbricata is a species of flowering plant in the family Bromeliaceae, endemic to Brazil (the states of Paraná and Santa Catarina). It was first described by Lyman Bradford Smith in 1952. It is found in the Atlantic Forest ecoregion of southeastern Brazil.

== See also ==
- Flora of the Atlantic Forest
- Endemic flora of Brazil
