= Quesnelia alborosea =

Scientific classification
- Kingdom: Plantae
- Clade: Embryophytes
- Clade: Tracheophytes
- Clade: Angiosperms
- Clade: Monocots
- Clade: Commelinids
- Order: Poales
- Family: Bromeliaceae
- Genus: Quesnelia
- Species: Q. alborosea

Binomial name
- Quesnelia alborosea Costa & Fontoura

Species of flowering plant

Quesnelia alborosea is a plant in the Bromeliaceae family. It is native to northeastern Brazil.
