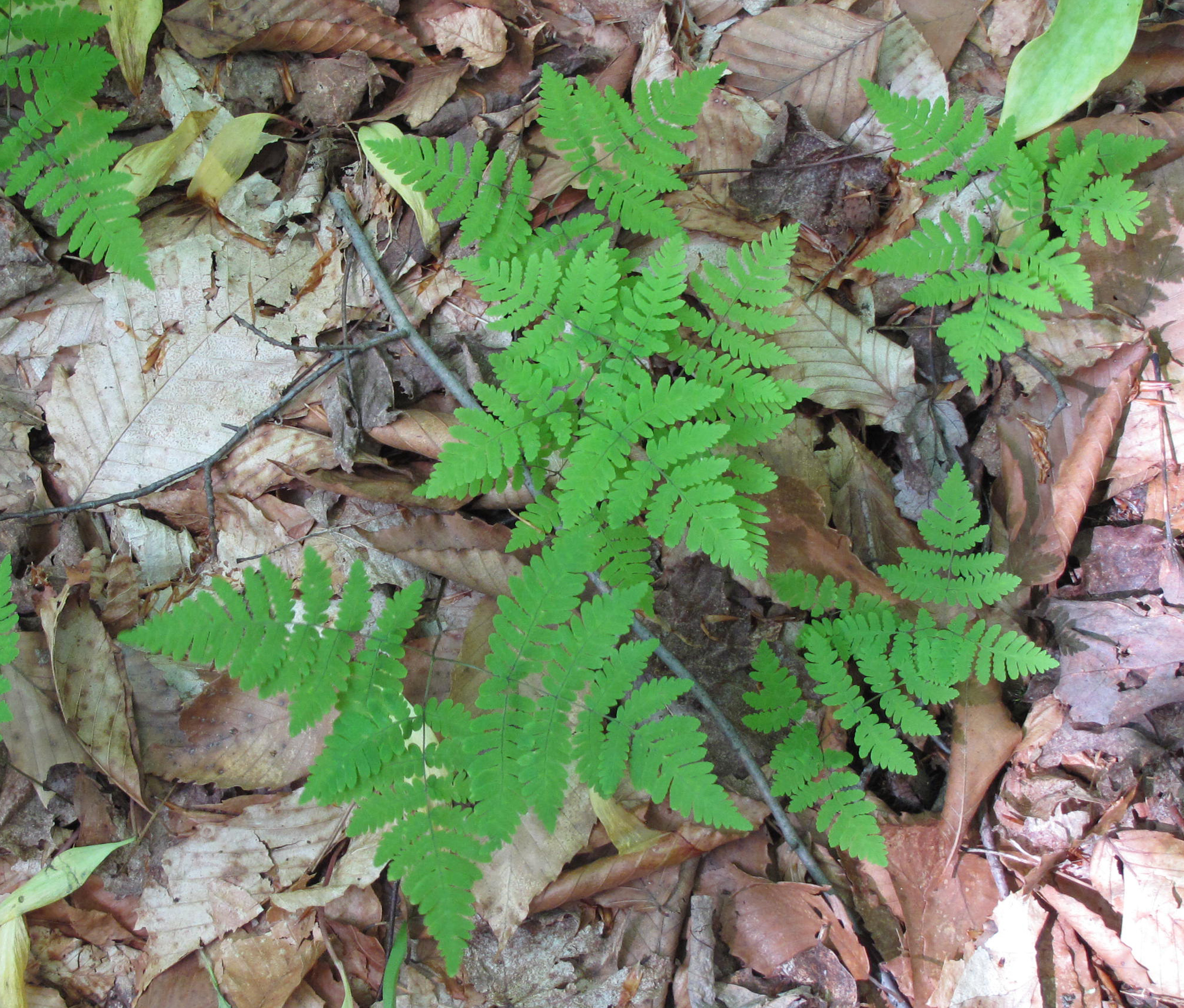

Conservation status
- Secure (NatureServe)

Scientific classification
- Kingdom: Plantae
- Clade: Tracheophytes
- Division: Polypodiophyta
- Class: Polypodiopsida
- Order: Polypodiales
- Suborder: Aspleniineae
- Family: Cystopteridaceae
- Genus: Gymnocarpium
- Species: G. disjunctum

Binomial name
- Gymnocarpium disjunctum (Rupr.) Ching

= Gymnocarpium disjunctum =

Species of fern

Gymnocarpium disjunctum is a species of fern in the family Cystopteridaceae, commonly known as Pacific oak fern, western oak fern, or Pacific oakfern.

== Description ==
Gymnocarpium disjunctum is a medium green fern with delicate-looking leaves that grows from a long slender creeping rhizome. The leaves do not arise from a central point but rather grow up individually from the creeping rhizome, often forming a loose grouping on the forest floor. The petioles (stipes) are 1-3 mm in diameter and 12-44 cm long with sparse glandular hairs distally. The petiole and blade midribs are brownish green to black in color. The leaves are bright to medium green and are 20-68 cm in length, with a broadly deltate blade, and are 3-pinnate to pinnatifid. The abaxial (lower) leaf surface and rachis are glabrous (hairless) or with sparse glandular hairs, and the adaxial (top) surface is glabrous. The largest pinnae are up to 18 cm long and are held nearly perpendicular to the rachis (leaf stem). The pinnae gradually decrease in size toward the distal end of the leaf, ending in a divided triangular leaflet at the tip. Sori form a single row on each side of the pinna midrib near the distal end of the leaf blade, becoming more crowded and less regularly arranged lower (proximally) on the blade.

In the autumn, the leaves lose most of their color and become very pale, sometimes nearly pure white.

== Range ==
Gymnocarpium disjunctum is native to coastal northeast Asia, Alaska, and British Columbia and ranges south to Oregon and Washington, and to interior southern British Columbia, Idaho, Montana, and Wyoming.

== Habitat ==
Gymnocarpium disjunctum grows in shade in moist coniferous forests.
