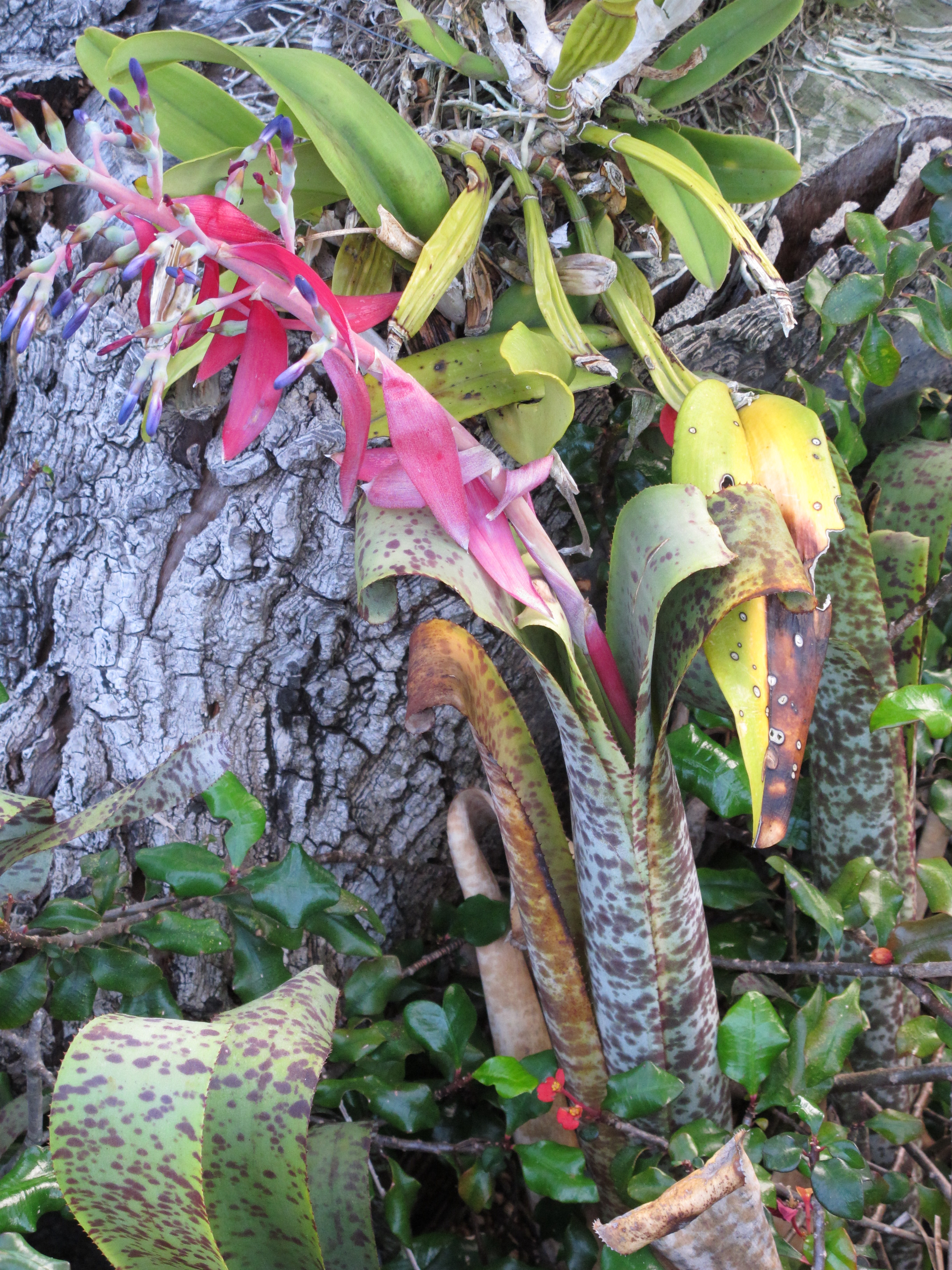

Scientific classification
- Kingdom: Plantae
- Clade: Tracheophytes
- Clade: Angiosperms
- Clade: Monocots
- Clade: Commelinids
- Order: Poales
- Family: Bromeliaceae
- Genus: Quesnelia
- Subgenus: Quesnelia subg. Billbergiopsis
- Species: Q. marmorata

Binomial name
- Quesnelia marmorata (Lem.) Read

Synonyms
- Aechmea marmorata (Lem.) Mez; Billbergia marmorata Lem.; Quesnelia effusa Lindm.

= Quesnelia marmorata =

Species of plant

Quesnelia marmorata is a species of flowering plant in the family Bromeliaceae, endemic to the Atlantic Forest ecoregion of southeastern Brazil. It was first described by Charles Antoine Lemaire in 1855 as Billbergia marmorata.

== See also ==
- Flora of the Atlantic Forest
- Endemic flora of Brazil
