= Quesnelia kautskyi =

Scientific classification
- Kingdom: Plantae
- Clade: Tracheophytes
- Clade: Angiosperms
- Clade: Monocots
- Clade: Commelinids
- Order: Poales
- Family: Bromeliaceae
- Genus: Quesnelia
- Subgenus: Quesnelia subg. Billbergiopsis
- Species: Q. kautskyi

Binomial name
- Quesnelia kautskyi C.M.Vieira

Species of plant

Quesnelia kautskyi is a species of flowering plant in the family Bromeliaceae, endemic to Brazil (the states of Espírito Santo and Minas Gerais). It was first described in 1999. It is found in the Atlantic Forest ecoregion of southeastern Brazil.

== See also ==
- Flora of the Atlantic Forest
- Endemic flora of Brazil
