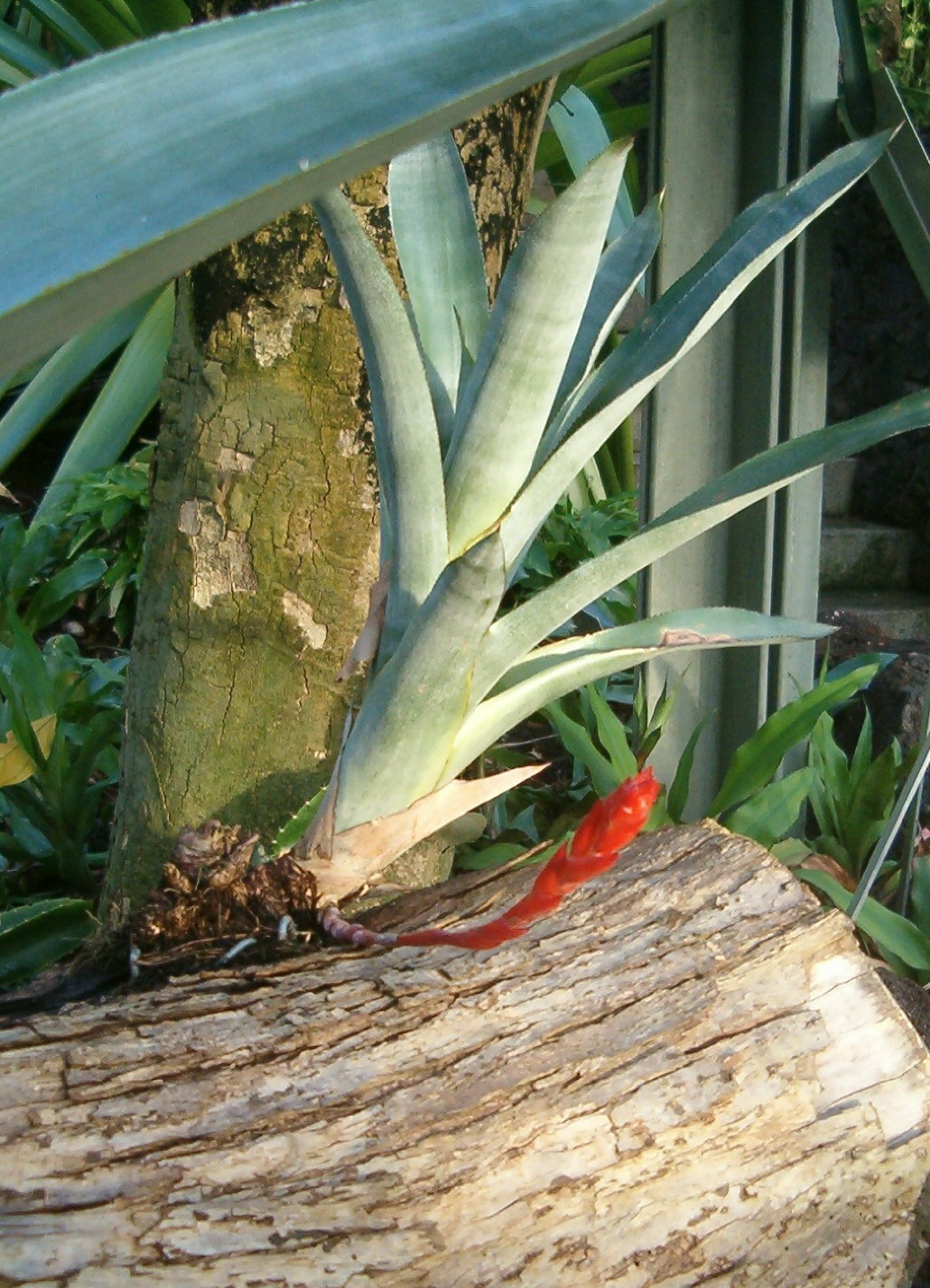

Scientific classification
- Kingdom: Plantae
- Clade: Tracheophytes
- Clade: Angiosperms
- Clade: Monocots
- Clade: Commelinids
- Order: Poales
- Family: Bromeliaceae
- Genus: Quesnelia
- Subgenus: Quesnelia subg. Billbergiopsis
- Species: Q. lateralis

Binomial name
- Quesnelia lateralis Wawra

Synonyms
- Billbergia enderi Regel; Quesnelia centralis Wawra; Quesnelia enderi (Regel) Gravis & Wittm.

= Quesnelia lateralis =

Species of flowering plant

Quesnelia lateralis is a species of bromeliad in the genus Quesnelia.

This species is endemic to the Atlantic Forest ecoregion of southeastern Brazil.
