= Quesnelia augustocoburgii =

Scientific classification
- Kingdom: Plantae
- Clade: Tracheophytes
- Clade: Angiosperms
- Clade: Monocots
- Clade: Commelinids
- Order: Poales
- Family: Bromeliaceae
- Genus: Quesnelia
- Subgenus: Quesnelia subg. Billbergiopsis
- Species: Q. augustocoburgii

Binomial name
- Quesnelia augustocoburgii Wawra

Species of plant

Quesnelia augustocoburgii is a species of flowering plant in the family Bromeliaceae, endemic to Brazil (the states of Minas Gerais and Rio de Janeiro). It was first described by Heinrich Wawra von Fernsee in 1880. It is found in the Atlantic Forest ecoregion of southeastern Brazil. The name is sometimes spelt with a hyphen as Quesnelia augusto-coburgii.

== See also ==
- Flora of the Atlantic Forest
- Endemic flora of Brazil
