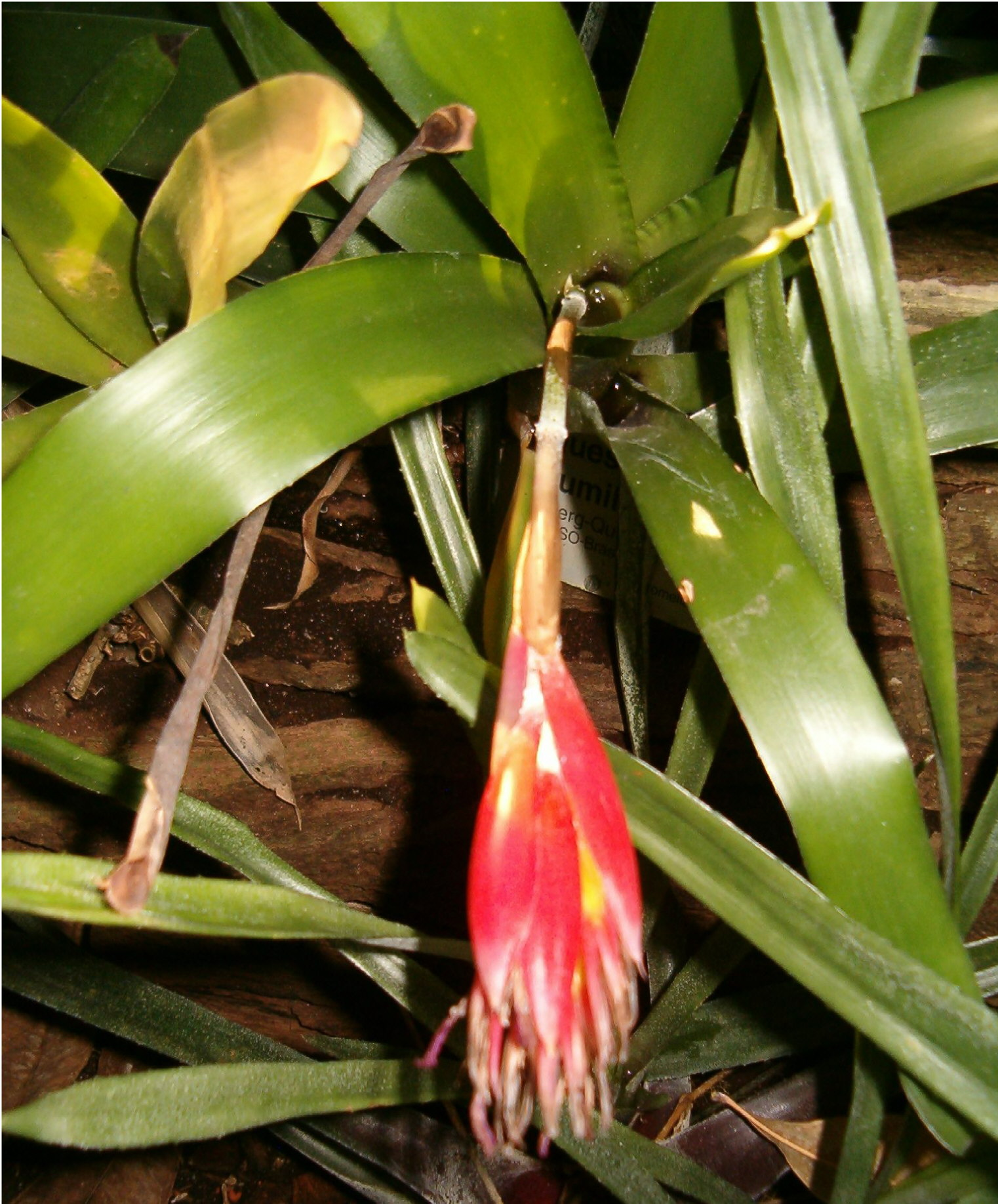

Scientific classification
- Kingdom: Plantae
- Clade: Embryophytes
- Clade: Tracheophytes
- Clade: Spermatophytes
- Clade: Angiosperms
- Clade: Monocots
- Clade: Commelinids
- Order: Poales
- Family: Bromeliaceae
- Genus: Quesnelia
- Subgenus: Quesnelia subg. Billbergiopsis
- Species: Q. humilis

Binomial name
- Quesnelia humilis Mez

Synonyms
- Quesnelia hoehnei L.B.Sm.

= Quesnelia humilis =

Species of plant

Quesnelia humilis is a species of flowering plant in the family Bromeliaceae, endemic to Brazil (São Paulo and Paraná). It was first described by Carl Christian Mez in 1892. It is found in the Atlantic Forest ecoregion of south and southeastern Brazil.

== See also ==
- Flora of the Atlantic Forest
- Endemic flora of Brazil
