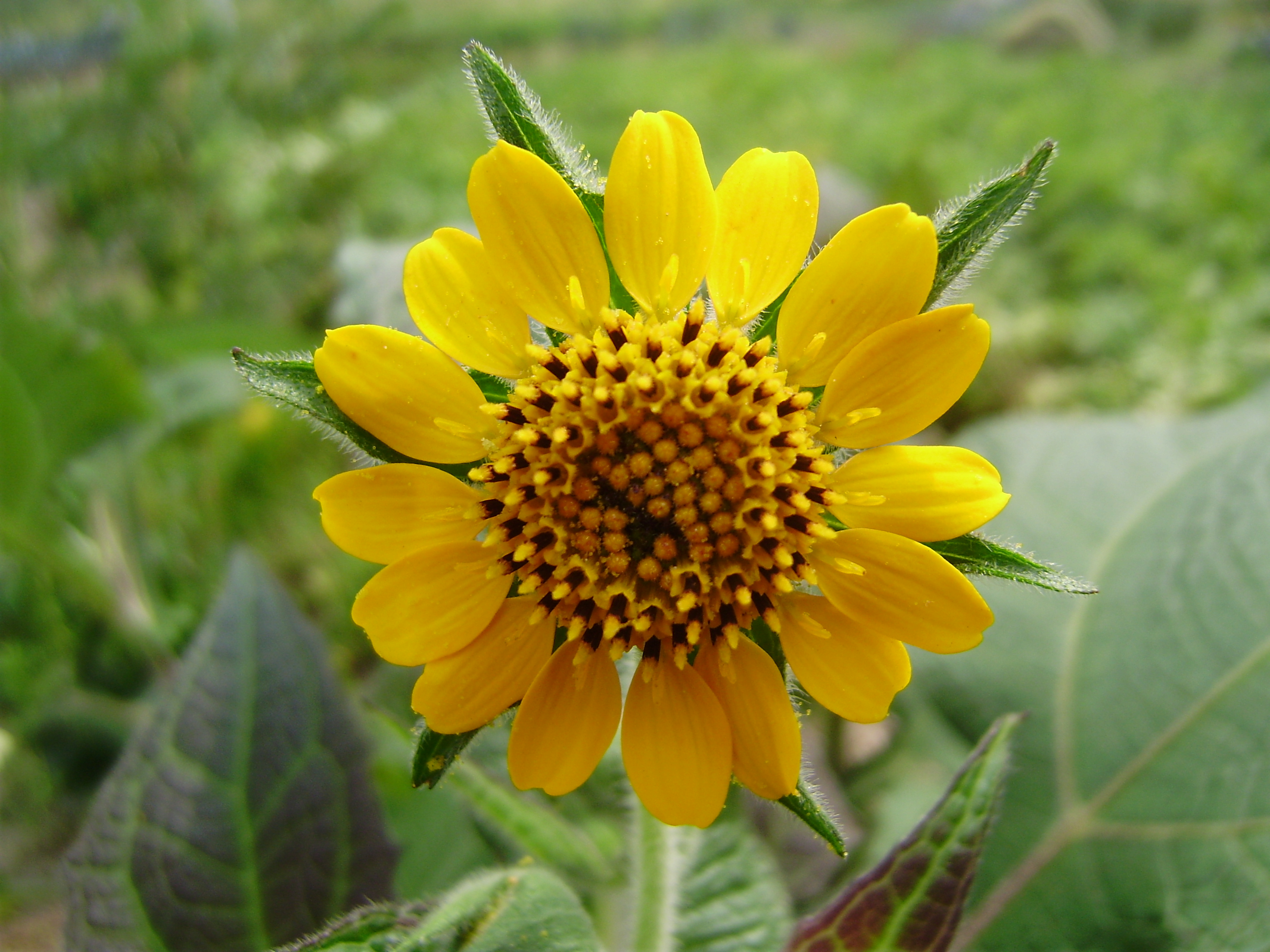
- Smallanthus sonchifolius

Scientific classification
- Kingdom: Plantae
- Clade: Tracheophytes
- Clade: Angiosperms
- Clade: Eudicots
- Clade: Asterids
- Order: Asterales
- Family: Asteraceae
- Subfamily: Asteroideae
- Tribe: Millerieae
- Subtribe: Espeletiinae
- Genus: Smallanthus; Mack.

Type species
- Smallanthus uvedalia (L.) Mack.

Synonyms
- Polymniastrum Small

= Smallanthus =

Genus of plants

Smallanthus is a genus of flowering plants in the tribe Millerieae within the family Asteraceae.

== Taxonomy ==
The following species are currently recognized:

- Smallanthus apus – Mexico
- Smallanthus cocuyensis – Colombia
- Smallanthus connatus – Brazil, Bolivia, Paraguay, Uruguay, Argentina, Chile
- Smallanthus fruticosus – Ecuador, Peru
- Smallanthus glabratus – Bolivia, Peru
- Smallanthus jelksii – Peru
- Smallanthus latisquamus – Mexico, Central America
- Smallanthus lundellii – Guatemala
- Smallanthus macroscyphus – Argentina, Bolivia, Brazil, Paraguay
- Smallanthus maculatus – Central America, Chiapas, Oaxaca, Tabasco, Veracruz
- Smallanthus macvaughii – Jalisco
- Smallanthus meridensis – Venezuela
- Smallanthus microcephalus – Ecuador, Peru
- Smallanthus oaxacanus – Mexico, Guatemala, Honduras
- Smallanthus obscurus – Chiapas
- Smallanthus parviceps – Bolivia
- Smallanthus putlanus – Oaxaca
- Smallanthus pyramidalis – Colombia, Ecuador, Venezuela
- Smallanthus quichensis – Guatemala, Costa Rica
- Smallanthus riograndensis – Rio Grande do Sul
- Smallanthus riparius – Colombia, Ecuador, Peru, Venezuela, Guatemala, Chiapas
- Smallanthus siegesbeckia – Bolivia, Peru, Paraguay
- Smallanthus sonchifolius (yacón) – Colombia, Ecuador, Peru, Bolivia
- Smallanthus uvedalia – eastern and south-central United States from Texas to Florida to New York
