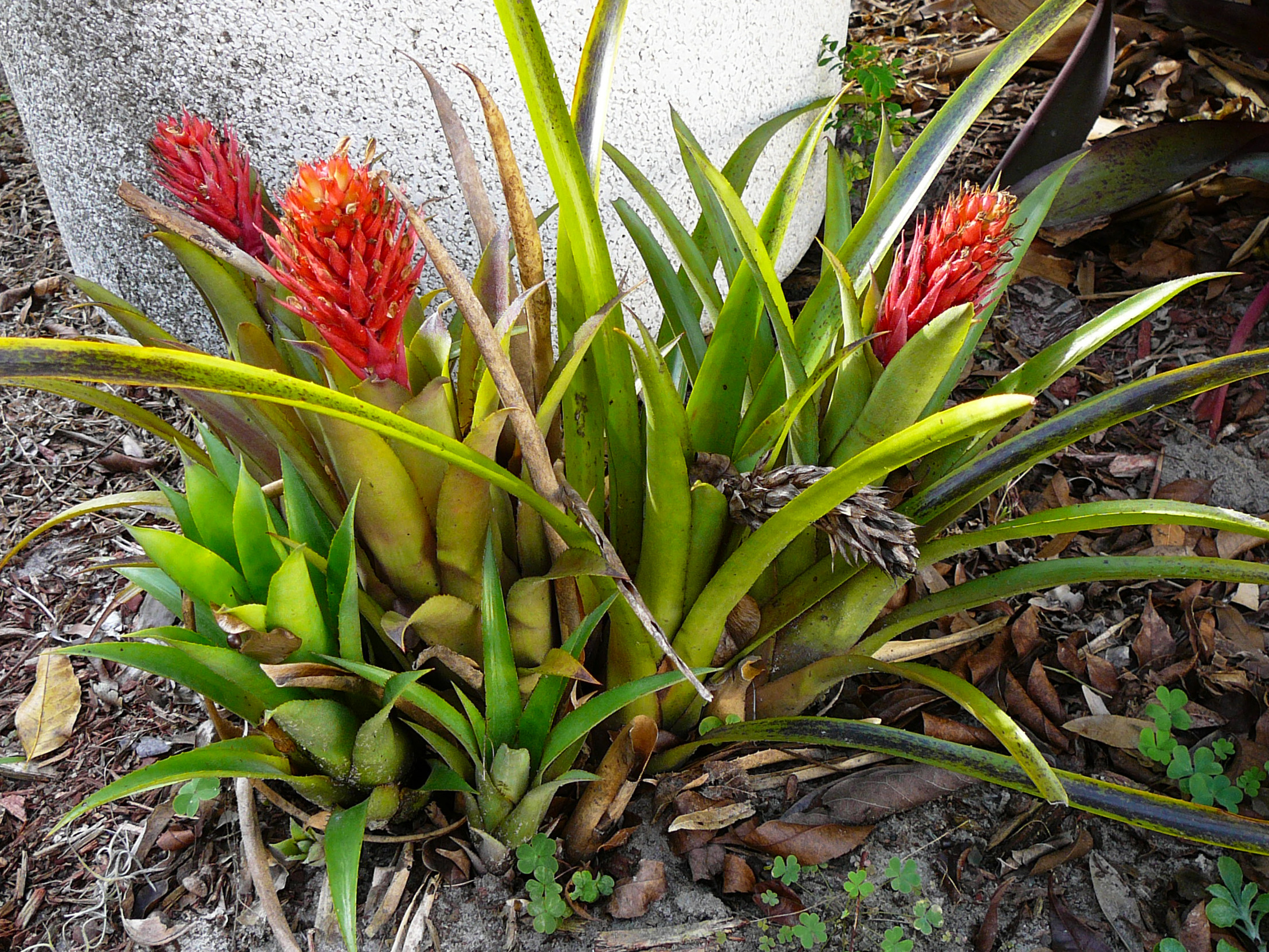

Scientific classification
- Kingdom: Plantae
- Clade: Tracheophytes
- Clade: Angiosperms
- Clade: Monocots
- Clade: Commelinids
- Order: Poales
- Family: Bromeliaceae
- Genus: Quesnelia
- Species: Q. arvensis

Binomial name
- Quesnelia arvensis (Vellozo) Mez

= Quesnelia arvensis =

Species of flowering plant

Quesnelia arvensis is a species of bromeliad in the genus Quesnelia.

== Distribution ==
This species is endemic to the Atlantic Forest ecoregion of southeastern Brazil.

It grows along the coast on moss and organic material in swampy forest areas, where it is shady, humid, and wet.

== Description ==
Quesnelia arvensis grows up to 2 feet (0.61 m) tall and wide.

The leaves are dark green and have a silver banding on the underside; the leaves are marked with conspicuous spines.

It grows a white stalk with a red bloom containing hidden blue petals.
