= Siphocampylus asplundii =

Conservation status
- Endangered (IUCN 3.1)

Scientific classification
- Kingdom: Plantae
- Clade: Tracheophytes
- Clade: Angiosperms
- Clade: Eudicots
- Clade: Asterids
- Order: Asterales
- Family: Campanulaceae
- Genus: Siphocampylus
- Species: S. asplundii

Binomial name
- Siphocampylus asplundii Jeppesen

Species of flowering plant

Siphocampylus asplundii is a species of plant in the family Campanulaceae. It is endemic to Ecuador. Its natural habitat is subtropical or tropical moist montane forests.
