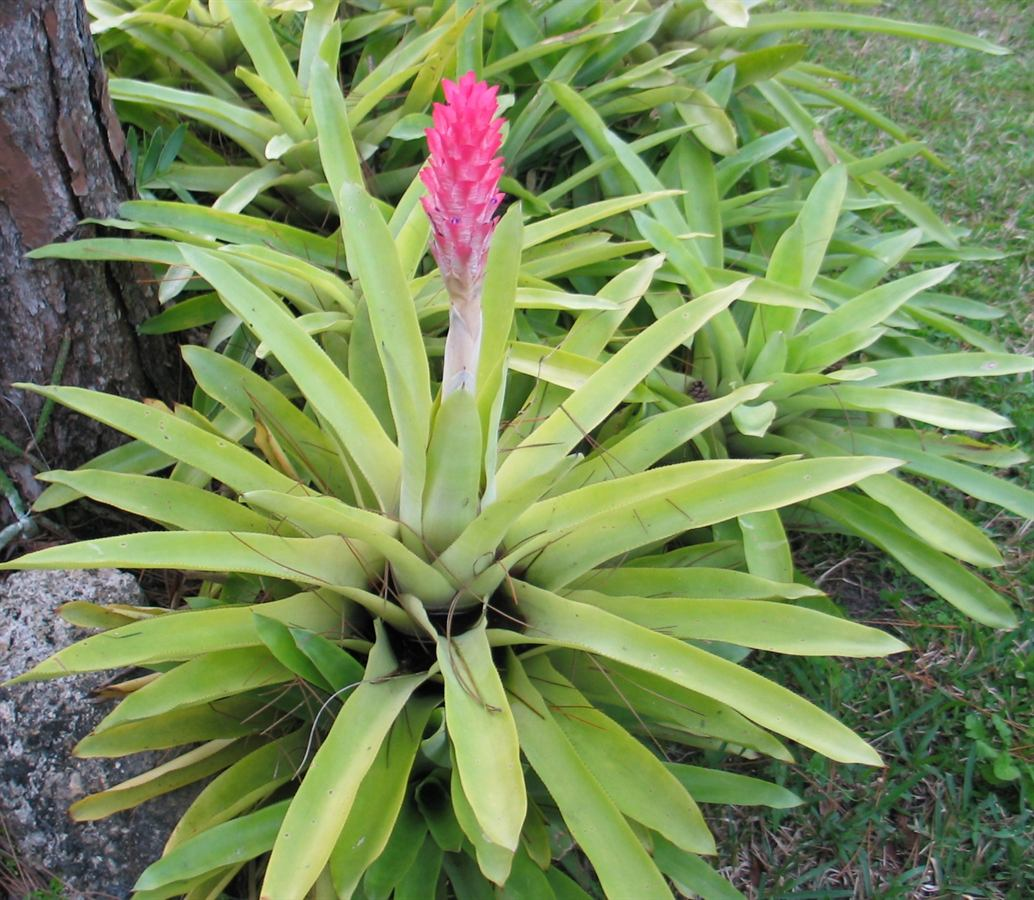

Scientific classification
- Kingdom: Plantae
- Clade: Tracheophytes
- Clade: Angiosperms
- Clade: Monocots
- Clade: Commelinids
- Order: Poales
- Family: Bromeliaceae
- Genus: Quesnelia
- Species: Q. quesneliana

Binomial name
- Quesnelia quesneliana (Brongn.) L.B.Sm.

= Quesnelia quesneliana =

Species of plant

Quesnelia quesneliana is a species of bromeliad in the genus Quesnelia.

This species is endemic to the Atlantic Forest ecoregion of southeastern Brazil.
