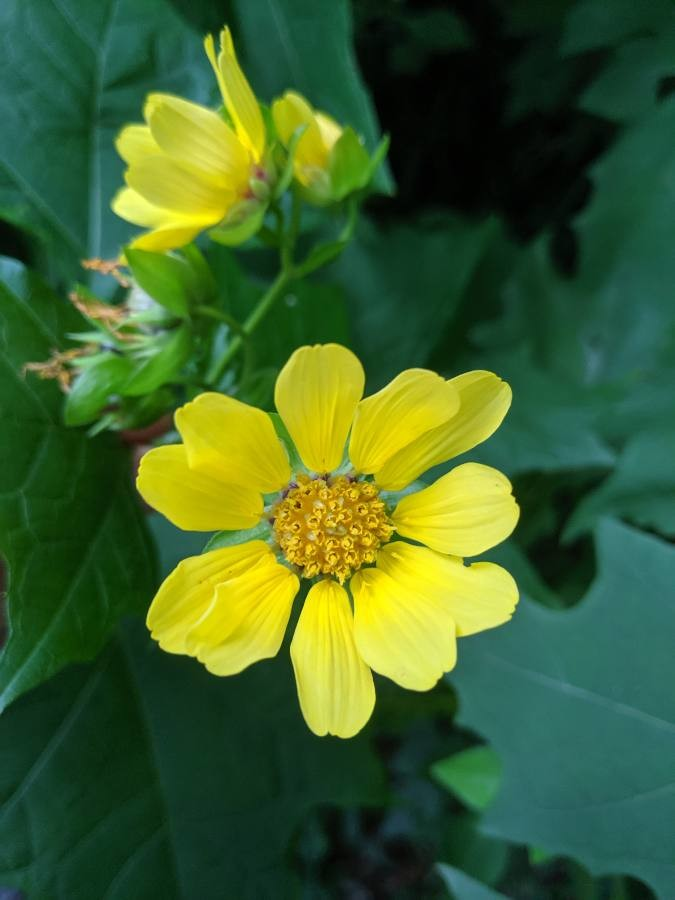

Scientific classification
- Kingdom: Plantae
- Clade: Tracheophytes
- Clade: Angiosperms
- Clade: Eudicots
- Clade: Asterids
- Order: Asterales
- Family: Asteraceae
- Genus: Smallanthus
- Species: S. uvedalia

Binomial name
- Smallanthus uvedalia (L.) Mack. ex Mack.

Synonyms
- Osteospermum uvedalia L.; Polymnia uvedalia (L.) L.; Smallanthus uvedalius (L.) Mack. ex Mack.

= Smallanthus uvedalia =

Hairy leafcup

Species of wildflower

Smallanthus uvedalia, known as hairy leafcup, bear's foot, and yellow flower leafcup, is a herbaceous perennial native to the Central and Eastern United States. It is a member of the family Asteraceae.

== Description ==
Hairy leafcup is 0.6 to 3.0 m (2 ft 0 in to 9 ft 10 in) tall. The stem is stout and generally smooth below the inflorescence branches. The opposite leaves form a small cup around the stem, hence the name leafcup. Each head has 7 to 13 yellow, 1–2 cm (3/8–3/4 in) long ray flowers to the outside, and 40-80 or so yellow tube-like disc flowers to the inside. A single large plant may produce one hundred or so heads. The entire plant has a resinous odor.

The species was formerly named Polymnia uvedalia (Linnaeus) Linnaeus.

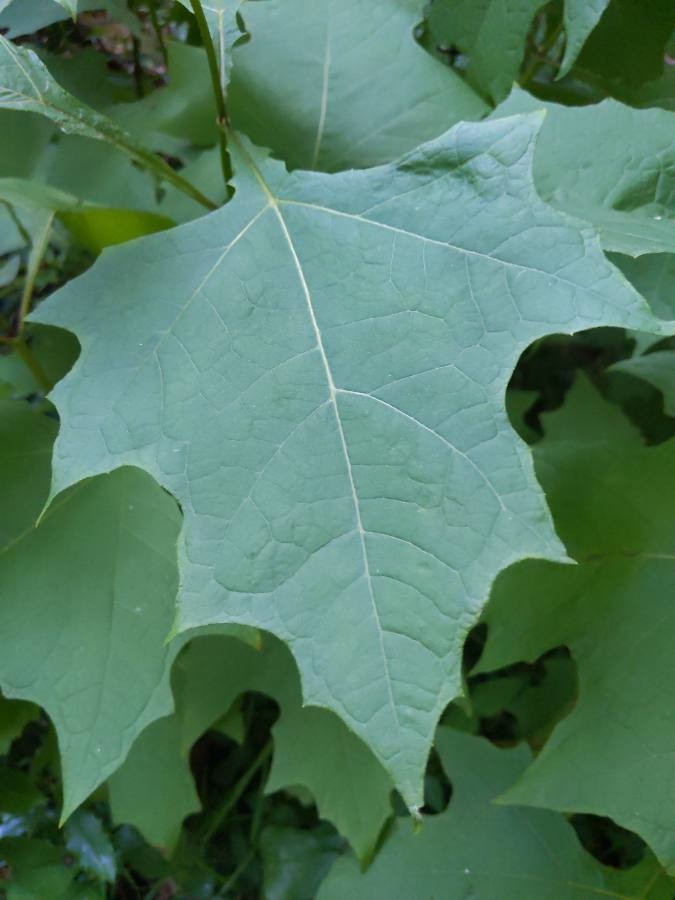
Leaf

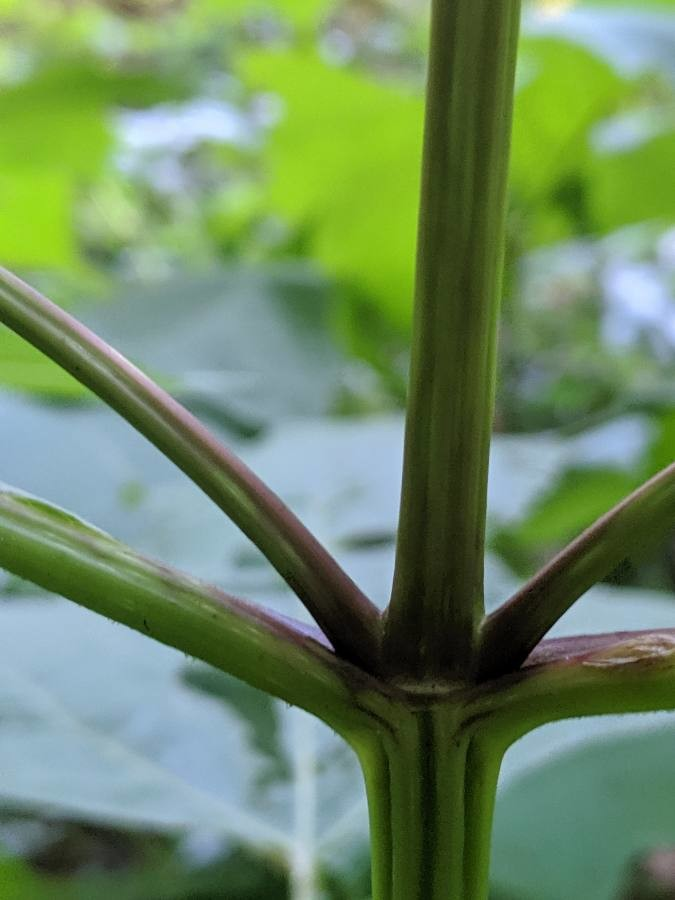
Stem

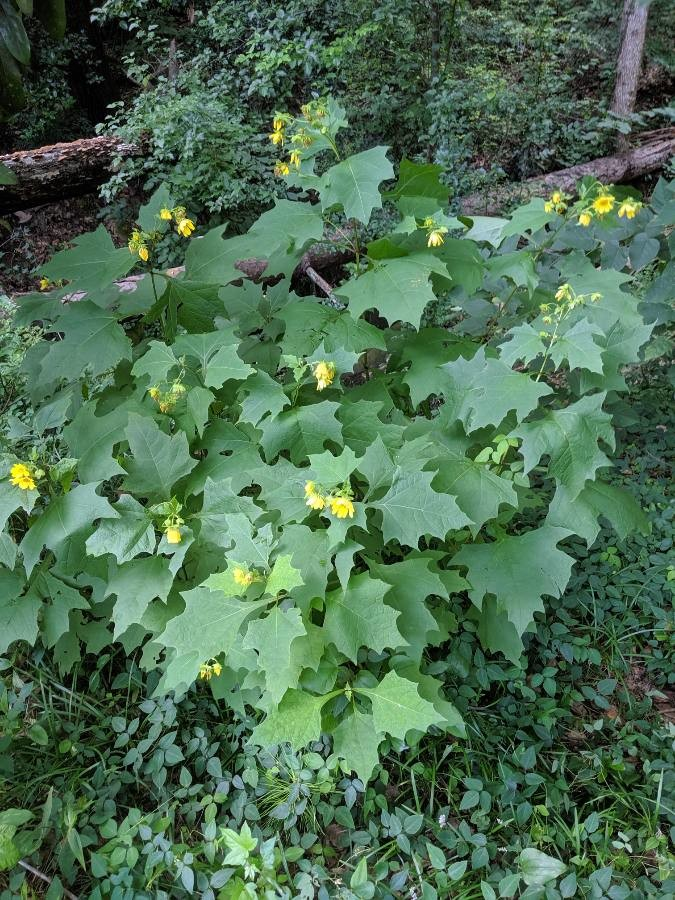
Bush
