= Quesnelia blanda =

Scientific classification
- Kingdom: Plantae
- Clade: Tracheophytes
- Clade: Angiosperms
- Clade: Monocots
- Clade: Commelinids
- Order: Poales
- Family: Bromeliaceae
- Genus: Quesnelia
- Subgenus: Quesnelia subg. Billbergiopsis
- Species: Q. blanda

Binomial name
- Quesnelia blanda (Schott ex Beer) Mez

Synonyms
- Bromelia blanda Schott ex Beer; Quesnelia strobilospica Wawra

Species of plant

Quesnelia blanda is a species of flowering plant in the family Bromeliaceae, endemic to southeastern Brazil. It was first described in 1856 as Bromelia blanda. As of November 2022, the Encyclopaedia of Bromeliads listed it under the synonym Quesnelia strobilospica, which it spelt Quesnelia strobilispica.
