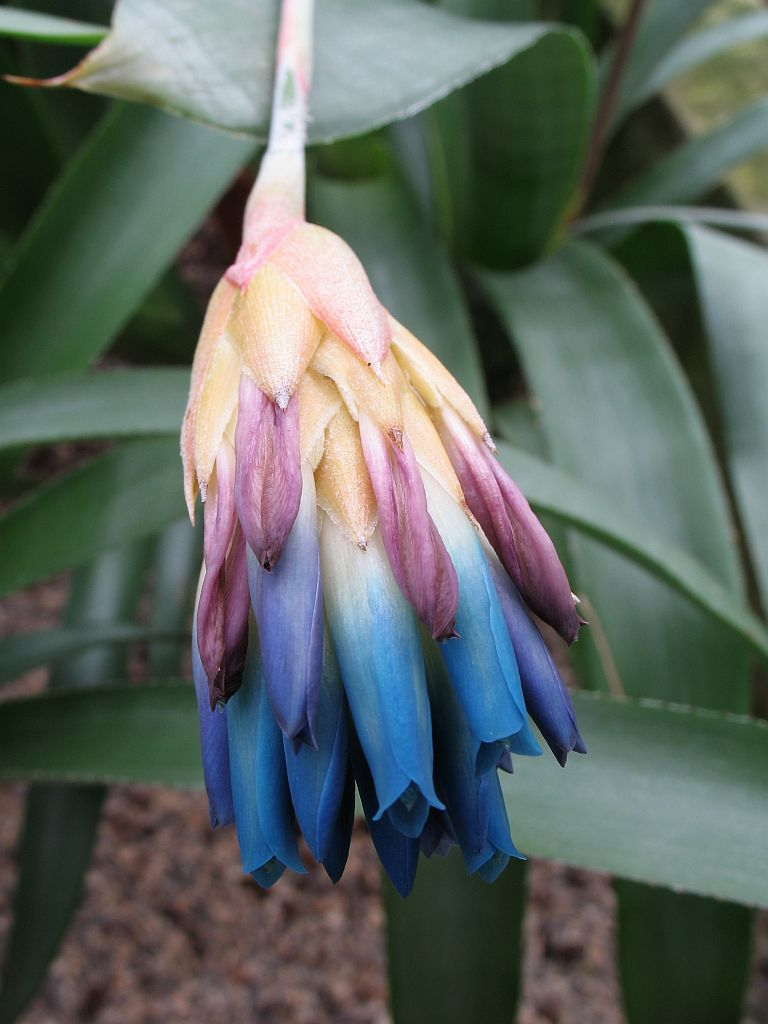
- Inflorescence

Scientific classification
- Kingdom: Plantae
- Clade: Tracheophytes
- Clade: Angiosperms
- Clade: Monocots
- Clade: Commelinids
- Order: Poales
- Family: Bromeliaceae
- Genus: Quesnelia
- Subgenus: Quesnelia subg. Billbergiopsis
- Species: Q. seideliana

Binomial name
- Quesnelia seideliana L.B.Sm. & Reitz

= Quesnelia seideliana =

Species of plant

Quesnelia seideliana is a species of flowering plant in the family Bromeliaceae, endemic to Brazil. It was first described in 1963. It is found in the Atlantic Forest ecoregion within Rio de Janeiro state, in southeastern Brazil.

== Gallery ==
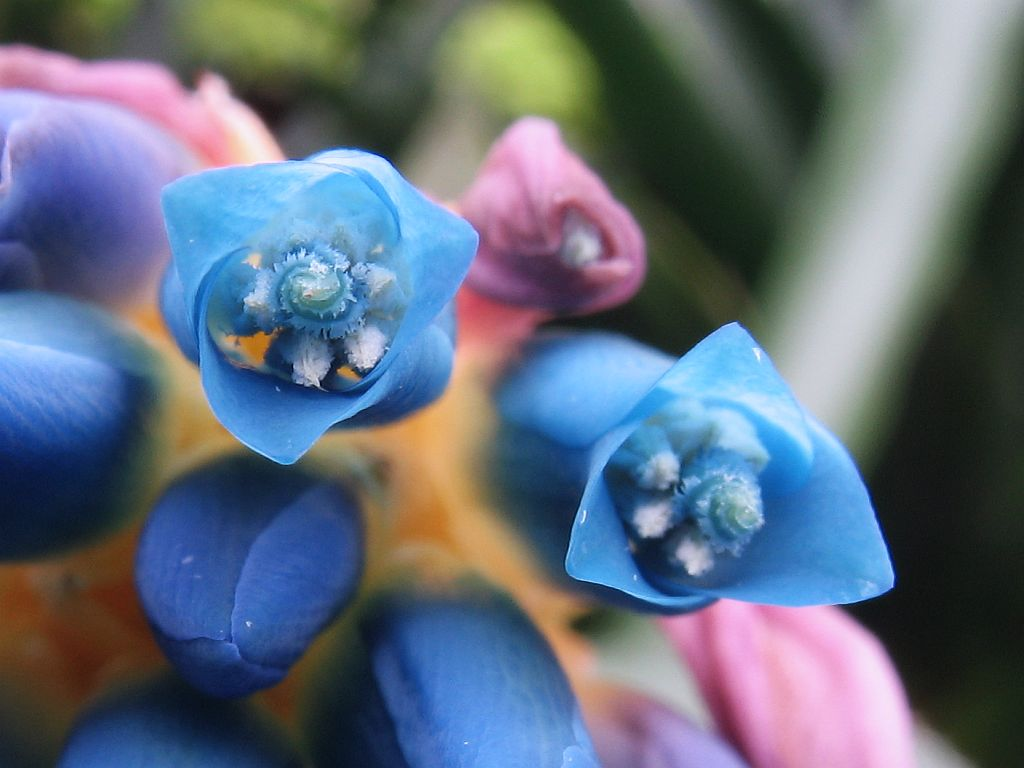
Flowers close up

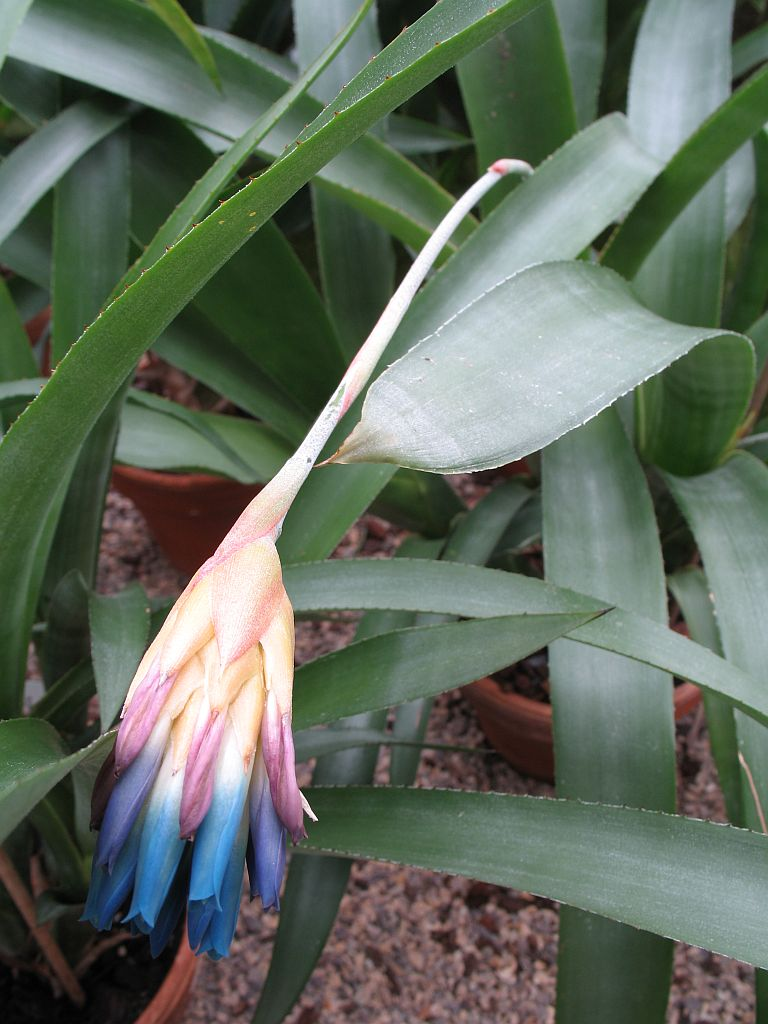
Quesnelia seideliana plant

== See also ==
- Flora of the Atlantic Forest
- Flora of Rio de Janeiro (state)
