= Siphocampylus sulfureus =

Scientific classification
- Kingdom: Plantae
- Clade: Tracheophytes
- Clade: Angiosperms
- Clade: Eudicots
- Clade: Asterids
- Order: Asterales
- Family: Campanulaceae
- Genus: Siphocampylus
- Species: S. sulfureus

Binomial name
- Siphocampylus sulfureus E.Wimm.

Species of shrub

Siphocampylus sulfureus is a species of plant in the family Campanulaceae. It grows as an annual herbaceous shrub to 3 m (occasionally 4 m) tall. It has tubular yellow flowers arranged in whorls around the vertical stems. The flowers emit a pungent musky smell reminiscent of foxes, particularly at night. In daytime, white-throated hummingbirds (Leucochloris albicollis), Brazilian rubies (Clytolaema rubricauda) and purple-breasted plovercrests visit the flowers while at night the tailed tailless bat (Anoura caudifer) visits.
