= Quesnelia indecora =

Scientific classification
- Kingdom: Plantae
- Clade: Embryophytes
- Clade: Tracheophytes
- Clade: Spermatophytes
- Clade: Angiosperms
- Clade: Monocots
- Clade: Commelinids
- Order: Poales
- Family: Bromeliaceae
- Genus: Quesnelia
- Subgenus: Quesnelia subg. Billbergiopsis
- Species: Q. indecora

Binomial name
- Quesnelia indecora Mez

Synonyms

Species of plant

Quesnelia indecora is a species of flowering plant in the family Bromeliaceae, endemic to Brazil (the states of Espírito Santo and Minas Gerais). It was first described by Carl Christian Mez in 1892. It is found in the Atlantic Forest ecoregion of southeastern Brazil.

== See also ==
- Flora of the Atlantic Forest
- Endemic flora of Brazil
