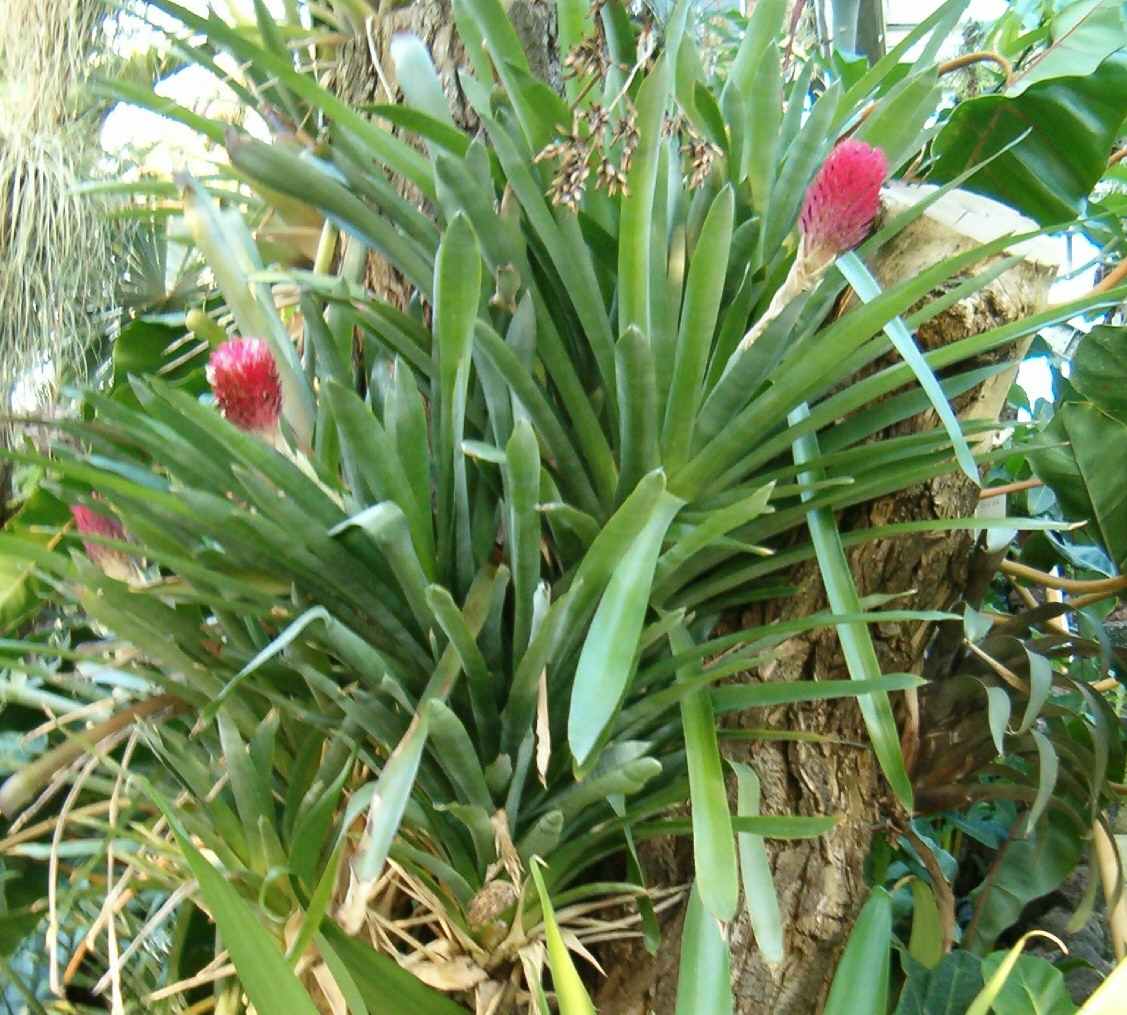
- Quesnelia testudo

Scientific classification
- Kingdom: Plantae
- Clade: Tracheophytes
- Clade: Angiosperms
- Clade: Monocots
- Clade: Commelinids
- Order: Poales
- Family: Bromeliaceae
- Subfamily: Bromelioideae
- Genus: Quesnelia; Gaudich.

Type species
- Quesnelia quesneliana

Synonyms
- Lievena Regel

= Quesnelia =

Genus of flowering plants

Quesnelia is a genus of flowering plants in the family Bromeliaceae, subfamily Bromelioideae. The genus is named after French businessman and patron of botany Edouard Prosper Quesnel, of Le Havre (1781–1850). Endemic to eastern Brazil, this genus contains 22 known species. This genus has two recognized subgenera: the type subgenus and Billbergiopsis Mez.

== Species ==
As of November 2022, Plants of the World Online accepted 24 species:

Image	Name	Distribution
	Quesnelia alborosea A.F.Costa & Fontoura	Bahia
	Quesnelia alvimii Leme	Bahia
	Quesnelia arvensis (Vellozo) Mez	from Rio de Janeiro to Paraná
	Quesnelia augustocoburgii Wawra	Minas Gerais, Rio de Janeiro
	Quesnelia blanda (Schott ex Beer) Mez	Minas Gerais, Espírito Santo, Rio de Janeiro
	Quesnelia clavata Amorim & Leme	Bahia
	Quesnelia conquistensis Leme	Bahia
	Quesnelia dubia Leme	Bahia
	Quesnelia edmundoi L.B. Smith	Rio de Janeiro
	Quesnelia humilis Mez	from São Paulo to Paraná
	Quesnelia imbricata L.B. Smith	Paraná, Santa Catarina
	Quesnelia indecora Mez	Espírito Santo, Minas Gerais
	Quesnelia kautskyi C. Vieira	Espírito Santo, Minas Gerais
	Quesnelia koltesii Amorim & Leme	Bahia
	Quesnelia lateralis Wawra	Espírito Santo, Minas Gerais
	Quesnelia liboniana (De Jonghe) Mez	Bahia, Rio de Janeiro, etc.
	Quesnelia marmorata (Lemaire) R.W. Read	Bahia, Rio de Janeiro, Espírito Santo, etc.
	Quesnelia morreniana (Baker) Mez	probably extinct
	Quesnelia quesneliana (Brongniart) L.B. Smith	Bahia, Rio de Janeiro, Espírito Santo, etc.
	Quesnelia seideliana L.B. Smith	Rio de Janeiro
	Quesnelia testudo Lindman	from São Paulo to Paraná
	Quesnelia tubifolia Leme & L.Kollmann	Minas Gerais
	Quesnelia vasconcelosiana Leme	Minas Gerais
	Quesnelia violacea Wanderley & S.L. Proença	São Paulo
