= Arcapillin =

Names
- IUPAC name 2′,4′,5-Trihydroxy-5′,6,7-trimethoxyflavone
- Systematic IUPAC name 2-(2,4-Dihydroxy-5-methoxyphenyl)-5-hydroxy-6,7-dimethoxy-4H-1-benzopyran-4-one

Identifiers
CAS Number	83162-82-7
3D model (JSmol)	Interactive image
ChEBI	CHEBI:81339
ChemSpider	139285
PubChem CID	158311
UNII	S53LT52TKY
CompTox Dashboard (EPA)	DTXSID001003170
- InChI: InChI=1S/C18H16O8/c1-23-13-4-8(9(19)5-10(13)20)12-6-11(21)16-14(26-12)7-15(24-2)18(25-3)17(16)22/h4-7,19-20,22H,1-3H3 Key: IZWKTABKAJGBFW-UHFFFAOYSA-N; InChI=1/C18H16O8/c1-23-13-4-8(9(19)5-10(13)20)12-6-11(21)16-14(26-12)7-15(24-2)18(25-3)17(16)22/h4-7,19-20,22H,1-3H3 Key: IZWKTABKAJGBFW-UHFFFAOYAR
- SMILES: COC1=C(C=C(C(=C1)C2=CC(=O)C3=C(C(=C(C=C3O2)OC)OC)O)O)O

Properties
Chemical formula	C_{18}H_{16}O_{8}
Molar mass	360.318 g·mol^{−1}
- Except where otherwise noted, data are given for materials in their standard state (at 25 °C [77 °F], 100 kPa). Infobox references

Arcapillin is an α-glucosidase and protein tyrosine phosphatase inhibitor isolated from Artemisia capillaris.
