= Santin (flavonol) =

- Chemical structure of santin

Names
- IUPAC name 5,7-Dihydroxy-3,4′,6-trimethoxyflavone
- Systematic IUPAC name 5,7-Dihydroxy-3,6-dimethoxy-2-(4-methoxyphenyl)-4H-1-benzopyran-4-one
- Other names 5,7-Dihydroxy-3,6,4′-trimethoxyflavone

Identifiers
CAS Number	27782-63-4
3D model (JSmol)	Interactive image
ChEBI	CHEBI:9024
ChEMBL	ChEMBL161957
ChemSpider	4445012
PubChem CID	5281695
UNII	5785Y952EH
CompTox Dashboard (EPA)	DTXSID10182109
- InChI: InChI=1S/C18H16O7/c1-22-10-6-4-9(5-7-10)16-18(24-3)15(21)13-12(25-16)8-11(19)17(23-2)14(13)20/h4-8,19-20H,1-3H3 Key: DWZAJFZEYZIHPO-UHFFFAOYSA-N; InChI=1/C18H16O7/c1-22-10-6-4-9(5-7-10)16-18(24-3)15(21)13-12(25-16)8-11(19)17(23-2)14(13)20/h4-8,19-20H,1-3H3 Key: DWZAJFZEYZIHPO-UHFFFAOYAB
- SMILES: COC1=CC=C(C=C1)C2=C(C(=O)C3=C(C(=C(C=C3O2)O)OC)O)OC

Properties
Chemical formula	C_{18}H_{16}O_{7}
Molar mass	344.319 g·mol^{−1}
- Except where otherwise noted, data are given for materials in their standard state (at 25 °C [77 °F], 100 kPa). verify (what is ?) Infobox references

Santin is an O-methylated flavonol. It was isolated from Tanacetum microphyllum.
