= Jaceidin =

- Chemical structure of jaceidin

Names
- IUPAC name 4′,5,7-Trihydroxy-3,3′,6-trimethoxyflavone
- Systematic IUPAC name 5,7-Dihydroxy-2-(4-hydroxy-3-methoxyphenyl)-3,6-dimethoxy-4H-1-benzopyran-4-one
- Other names Jaceidine; Quercetagetin 3,3′,6-trimethyl ether

Identifiers
CAS Number	10173-01-0
3D model (JSmol)	Interactive image
ChemSpider	4576662
PubChem CID	5464461
UNII	KW8K569J2D
CompTox Dashboard (EPA)	DTXSID30144148
- InChI: InChI=1S/C18H16O8/c1-23-11-6-8(4-5-9(11)19)16-18(25-3)15(22)13-12(26-16)7-10(20)17(24-2)14(13)21/h4-7,19-21H,1-3H3 Key: XUWTZJRCCPNNJR-UHFFFAOYSA-N; InChI=1/C18H16O8/c1-23-11-6-8(4-5-9(11)19)16-18(25-3)15(22)13-12(26-16)7-10(20)17(24-2)14(13)21/h4-7,19-21H,1-3H3 Key: XUWTZJRCCPNNJR-UHFFFAOYAP
- SMILES: COC1=C(C=CC(=C1)C2=C(C(=O)C3=C(C(=C(C=C3O2)O)OC)O)OC)O

Properties
Chemical formula	C_{18}H_{16}O_{8}
Molar mass	360.318 g·mol^{−1}
Melting point	130–135 °C (266–275 °F; 403–408 K)
- Except where otherwise noted, data are given for materials in their standard state (at 25 °C [77 °F], 100 kPa). verify (what is ?) Infobox references

Jaceidin is an O-methylated flavonol. It can be found in Chamomilla recutita, in Centaurea jacea and can be synthesized. Jaceidin has many different characteristics, such as a molar mass of 360.31 g/mol. It also has a melting point of 130-135 °C.

== Glycosides ==
- Jacein
