= Centaureidin =

- Chemical structure of centaureidin

Names
- IUPAC name 3′,5,7-Trihydroxy-3,4′,6-trimethoxyflavone
- Systematic IUPAC name 5,7-Dihydroxy-2-(3-hydroxy-4-methoxyphenyl)-3,6-dimethoxy-4H-1-benzopyran-4-one
- Other names Desmethoxycentaureidine

Identifiers
CAS Number	17313-52-9
3D model (JSmol)	Interactive image
ChEBI	CHEBI:69356
ChemSpider	4474997
PubChem CID	5315773
UNII	548R7290J9
CompTox Dashboard (EPA)	DTXSID50169530
- InChI: InChI=1S/C18H16O8/c1-23-11-5-4-8(6-9(11)19)16-18(25-3)15(22)13-12(26-16)7-10(20)17(24-2)14(13)21/h4-7,19-21H,1-3H3 Key: BZXULYMZYPRZOG-UHFFFAOYSA-N; InChI=1/C18H16O8/c1-23-11-5-4-8(6-9(11)19)16-18(25-3)15(22)13-12(26-16)7-10(20)17(24-2)14(13)21/h4-7,19-21H,1-3H3 Key: BZXULYMZYPRZOG-UHFFFAOYAN
- SMILES: O=C1c3c(O)c(OC)c(O)cc3O/C(=C1/OC)c2ccc(OC)c(O)c2

Properties
Chemical formula	C_{18}H_{16}O_{8}
Molar mass	360.31 g/mol
Density	1.542 g/mL
- Except where otherwise noted, data are given for materials in their standard state (at 25 °C [77 °F], 100 kPa). verify (what is ?) Infobox references

Centaureidin is an O-methylated flavonol. It can be isolated from Tanacetum microphyllum, Achillea millefolium, Brickellia veronicaefolia, Bidens pilosa and Polymnia fruticosa.
