= Ermanin =

- Chemical structure of ermanin

Names
- IUPAC name 5,7-Dihydroxy-3,4′-dimethoxyflavone
- Systematic IUPAC name 5,7-Dihydroxy-3-methoxy-2-(4-methoxyphenyl)-4H-1-benzopyran-4-one
- Other names 3,4'-Dimethoxychrysin; Kaempferol-3,4'-dimethylether; Kaempferol 3,4'-di-O-methyl ether 5,7-Dihydroxy-3-methoxy-2-(4-methoxyphenyl)-4-benzopyrone

Identifiers
CAS Number	20869-95-8
3D model (JSmol)	Interactive image
ChEBI	CHEBI:146142
ChemSpider	4508982
ECHA InfoCard	100.040.070
PubChem CID	5352001
UNII	850D90YJN3
CompTox Dashboard (EPA)	DTXSID90174986
- InChI: InChI=1S/C17H14O6/c1-21-11-5-3-9(4-6-11)16-17(22-2)15(20)14-12(19)7-10(18)8-13(14)23-16/h3-8,18-19H,1-2H3 Key: RJCJVIFSIXKSAH-UHFFFAOYSA-N; InChI=1/C17H14O6/c1-21-11-5-3-9(4-6-11)16-17(22-2)15(20)14-12(19)7-10(18)8-13(14)23-16/h3-8,18-19H,1-2H3 Key: RJCJVIFSIXKSAH-UHFFFAOYAU
- SMILES: COC1=CC=C(C=C1)C2=C(C(=O)C3=C(C=C(C=C3O2)O)O)OC

Properties
Chemical formula	C_{17}H_{14}O_{6}
Molar mass	314.293 g·mol^{−1}
- Except where otherwise noted, data are given for materials in their standard state (at 25 °C [77 °F], 100 kPa). verify (what is ?) Infobox references

Ermanin is an O-methylated flavonol. It was isolated from Tanacetum microphyllum.
