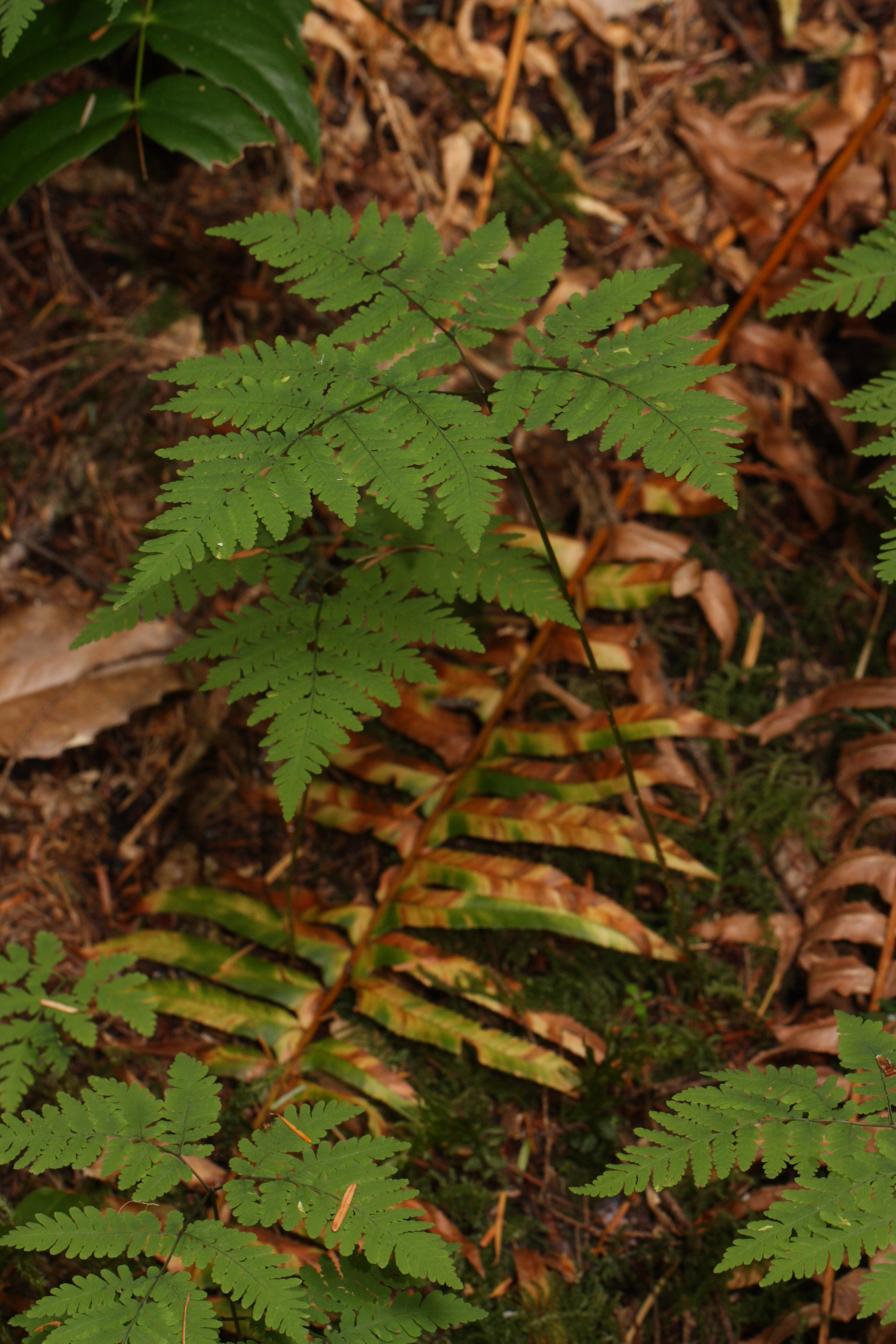

Conservation status
- Secure (NatureServe)

Scientific classification
- Kingdom: Plantae
- Clade: Tracheophytes
- Division: Polypodiophyta
- Class: Polypodiopsida
- Order: Polypodiales
- Suborder: Aspleniineae
- Family: Cystopteridaceae
- Genus: Gymnocarpium
- Species: G. dryopteris

Binomial name
- Gymnocarpium dryopteris (L.) Newman

Synonyms
- Synonymy: Dryopteris dryopteris (L.) Britton; Dryopteris disjuncta (Rupr.) C.V.Morton; Dryopteris linnaeana C. Chr.; Lastrea dryopteris (L.) Bory; Phegopteris dryopteris (L.) Fée; Thelypteris dryopteris (L.) Sloss.; Aspidium dryopteris Baumg.; Carpogymnia dryopteris (L.) Á. Löve & D. Löve; Currania dryopteris (L.) Wherry; Dryopteris pulchella (Salisb.) Hayek; Dryopteris pumila V.I. Krecz.; Filix pumila Gilib.; Nephrodium dryopteris (L.) Michx.; Polypodium dryopteris L.; Polypodium pulchellum Salisb.

= Gymnocarpium dryopteris =

Species of fern

Gymnocarpium dryopteris, the western oakfern, common oak fern, oak fern, or northern oak fern, is a deciduous fern of the family Cystopteridaceae. It is widespread across much of North America and Eurasia. It has been found in Canada, the United States, Greenland, China, Japan, Korea, Russia, and most of Europe. It is a seedless, vascular plant (with xylem and phloem) that reproduces via spores (not seeds or flowers) and have a life cycle with alternating, free-living sporophyte and gametophyte phases.

== Description ==
Gymnocarpium dryopteris has small, delicate fronds up to 40 cm (16 inches) long, with ternately-compound pinnae (leaves). Each petiole grows from one node on a creeping rhizome. Fronds occur singly. On the underside of matured pinnae the naked sori can be found (the Latin generic name gymnocarpium means "with naked fruit"). The species grows in coniferous woodlands and on shale talus slopes.

Despite its common name, Gymnocarpium dryopteris, a forest understory plant, is not found in association with Quercus (oak).

In cultivation in the UK this plant and the cultivar "Plumosum" have gained the Royal Horticultural Society's Award of Garden Merit.

== Life-cycle ==
Like most plant species, oak fern alternates generations, where there is a diploid generation in the form of a sporophyte (which produces spores), and is followed by a haploid generation in the form of a gametophyte (which produces gametes). The sporangia are found in clusters on the underside of the leaf, called sori. Each sporangium produces multiple sporocytes, with each sporocyte dividing twice, giving rise to four non-sexual spores. Once the spores germinate, they form a prothallus, which develops a number of archegonia (ovaries), and antheridia (spermaries). If water is present, the spermatozoids travel from the antheridia to the archegonia and the egg is fertilized when the two come into contact. An embryo then grows out of the gametophyte, producing a sporophyte.

== Habitat ==
Oak fern commonly occurs in moist, shady forests, with wet soil and humid conditions. Often found in drainage areas, ditches and north-facing slopes, it thrives in soils that are well-drained and have a ph of 4.5-6.4. Soil texture varies from silty, clay-loams, to sandy gravel. This fern occurs at elevations of 1,700–4,500 ft (520–1,370 m) along moderately steep slopes with north, east and west aspects. As it is extremely sensitive to ecological changes, the northern oak fern is an important moisture indicator species.

== Gallery ==
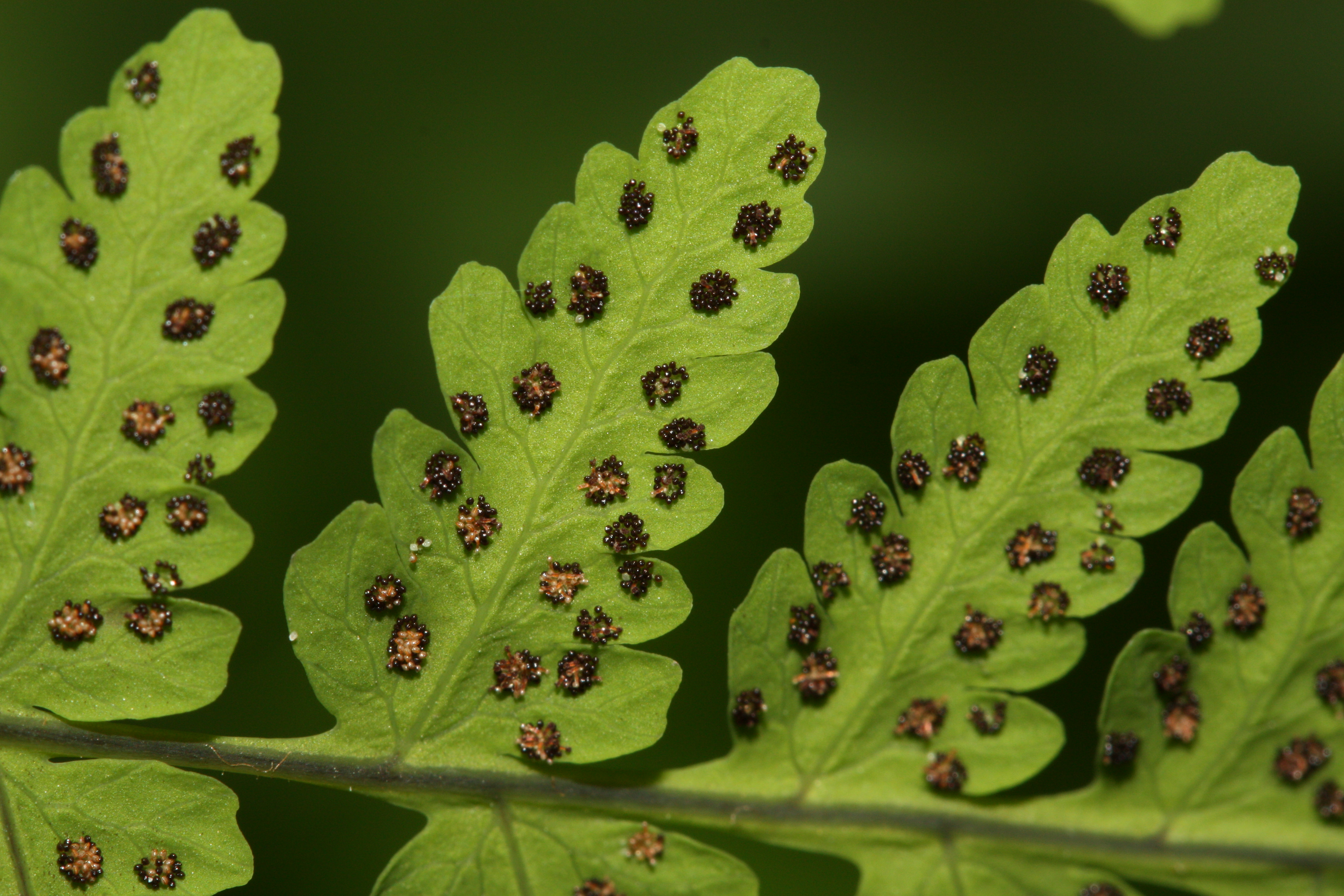
The leaf of the fern Gymnocarpium dryopteris, showing sori (groups of sporangia).

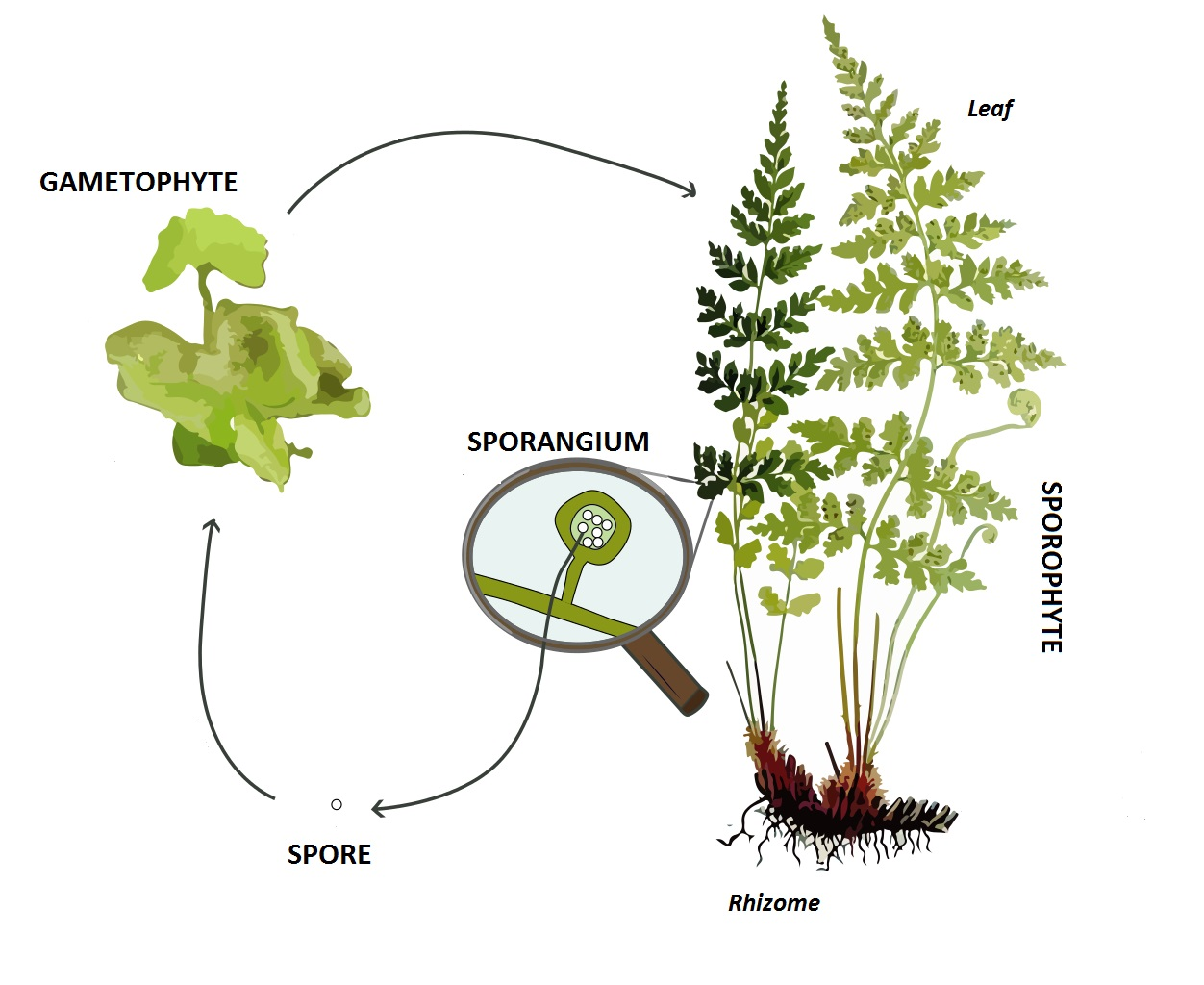
Life cycle of a pteridophyte.

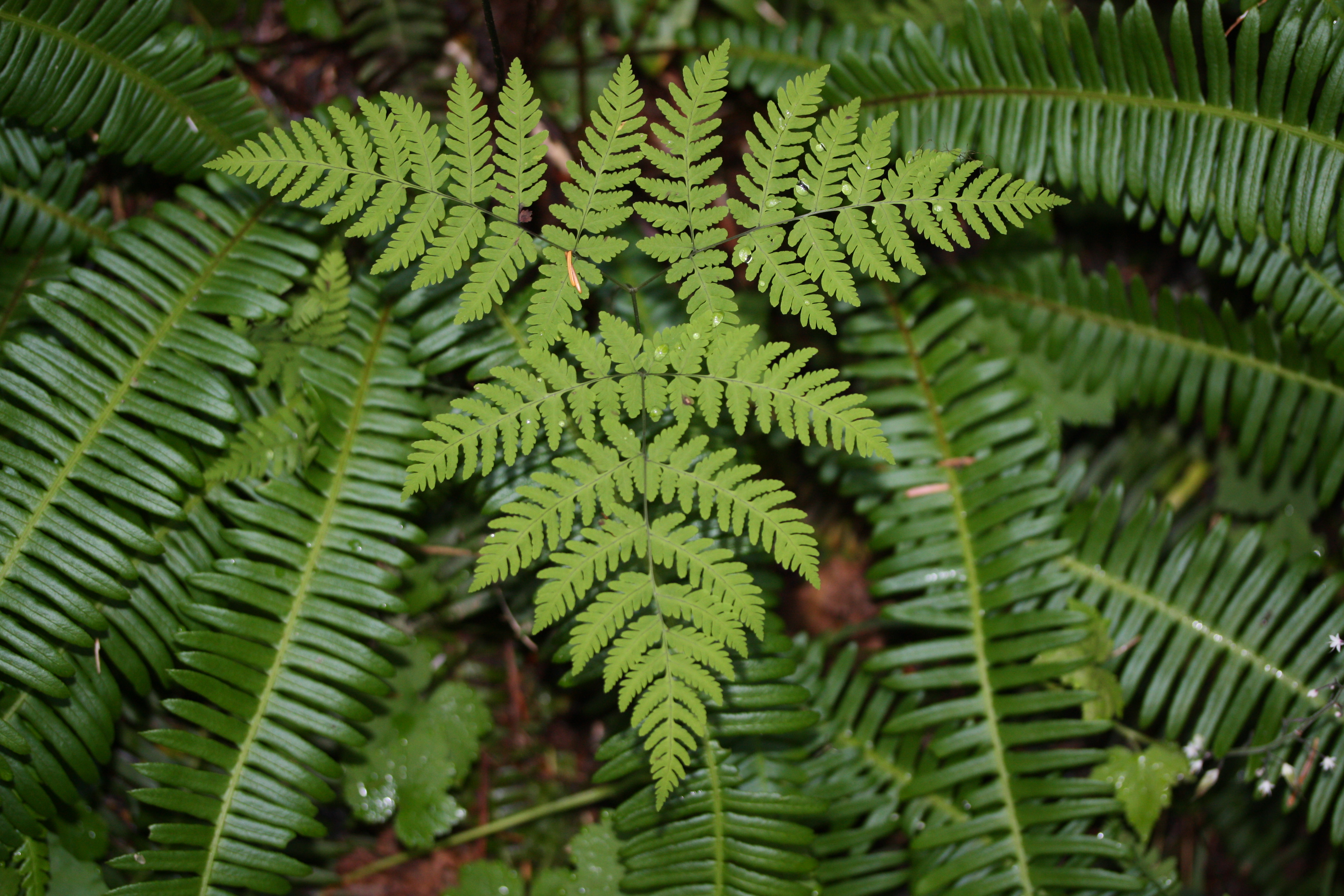
Gymnocarpium dryopteris shown in the middle of the image, surrounded by sword ferns (Polystichum munitum).
