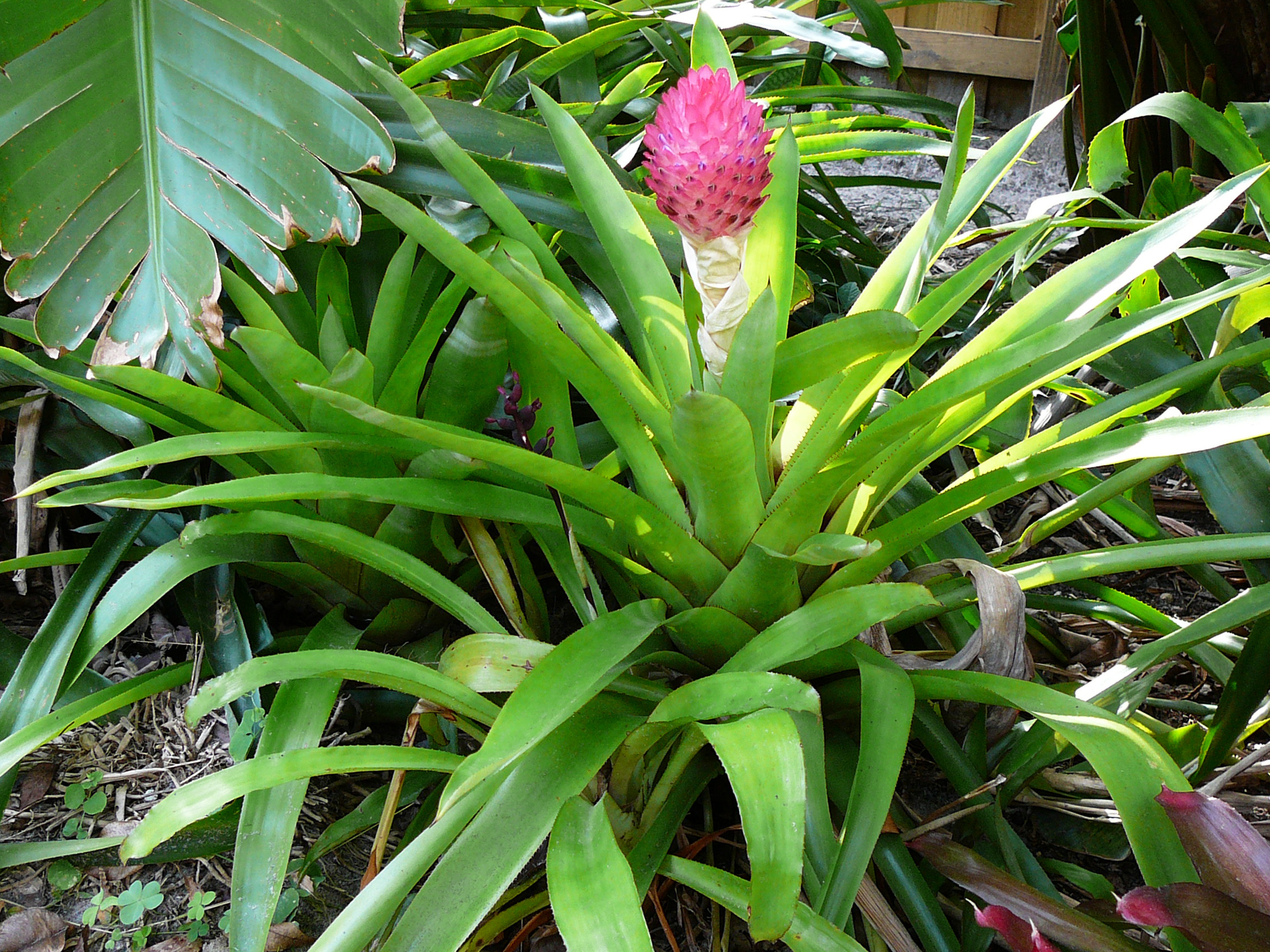

Scientific classification
- Kingdom: Plantae
- Clade: Tracheophytes
- Clade: Angiosperms
- Clade: Monocots
- Clade: Commelinids
- Order: Poales
- Family: Bromeliaceae
- Genus: Quesnelia
- Species: Q. testudo

Binomial name
- Quesnelia testudo Lindm.

Synonyms
- Quesnelia skinneri É.Morren ex Harms

= Quesnelia testudo =

Species of flowering plant

Quesnelia testudo is a species of flowering plant in the family Bromeliaceae. This bromeliad is endemic to the Atlantic Forest ecoregion of southeastern Brazil.

== Description ==
It can be found growing on trees in virgin forests near Serra do Mar. It has a well-formed rosette of about 20 plain green leaves. These leaves have lightly serrated edges and are tipped by a sharp spine. The bloom reaches about a foot high. The inflorescence bears rosy red bracts and violet or white petals. It is a semi-cold hardy bromeliad that can tolerate temperatures down to 25 °F for a few hours.

== Cultivars ==
- Quesnelia 'Farro'
- × Quesmea 'Lymanii'
