= Smallanthus fruticosus =

Scientific classification
- Kingdom: Plantae
- Clade: Tracheophytes
- Clade: Angiosperms
- Clade: Eudicots
- Clade: Asterids
- Order: Asterales
- Family: Asteraceae
- Genus: Smallanthus
- Species: S. fruticosus

Binomial name
- Smallanthus fruticosus (Benth.) H.Rob.

Synonyms
- Polymnia arborea Hieron.; Polymnia fruticosa Benth.; Smallanthus fruticosa (Benth.) H. Rob.

Species of plant

Smallanthus fruticosus is a species of shrub in the family Asteraceae. It is native to the Andes (from Colombia to Bolivia).

S. fruticosus contains the cytotoxic flavone centaureidin and the flavanone sakuranetin.
