= Silver Ghost (disambiguation) =

The Silver Ghost is a model of Rolls-Royce automobile.

Silver Ghost may also refer to:

- Silver Ghosts, a fictional race of aliens in the Xeelee Sequence
- Silver Ghost (comics), a minor supervillain in the DC Universe
- Silver Ghost, a tactical role-playing video game published by Kure Software Koubou
- Silver Ghost (public house), a pub in England
- Sthenopis argenteomaculatus, the silver-spotted ghost moth
- an epithet for a character in the Community episode Modern Espionage
