= Female fern =

Female fern may refer to:

- Lady fern, the genus Athyrium
  - particularly, the common lady fern (Athyrium filix-femina)
- the common brake (Pteridium aquilinum) — a lesser used name
- literal meaning of Thelypteris (also: maiden ferns)
