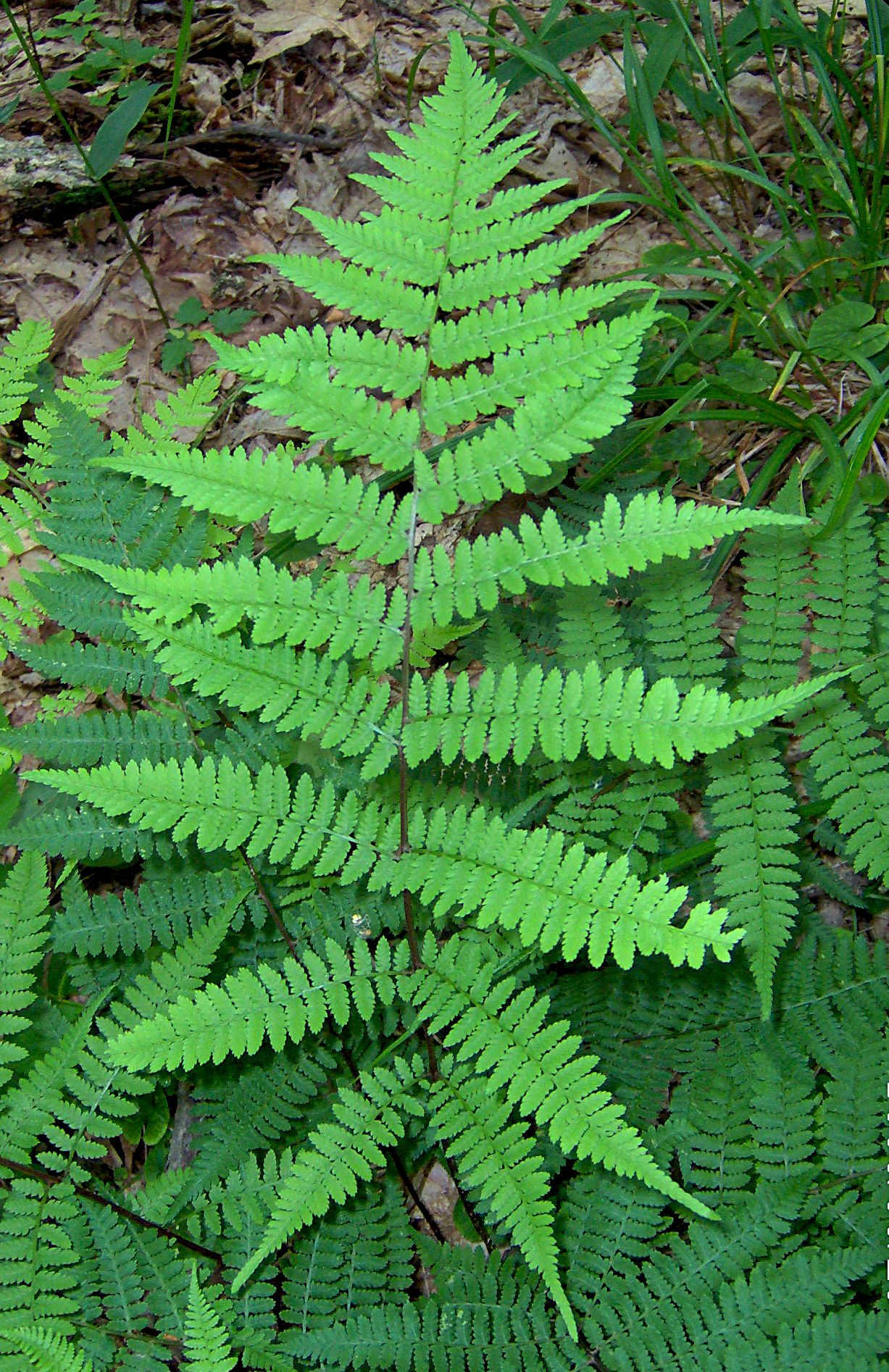

Conservation status
- Secure (NatureServe)

Scientific classification
- Kingdom: Plantae
- Clade: Embryophytes
- Clade: Tracheophytes
- Division: Polypodiophyta
- Class: Polypodiopsida
- Order: Polypodiales
- Suborder: Aspleniineae
- Family: Athyriaceae
- Genus: Athyrium
- Species: A. angustum

Binomial name
- Athyrium angustum (Willd.) C. Presl

= Athyrium angustum =

Species of fern

Athyrium angustum, the northern lady fern or subarctic lady fern, is a fern native to northeastern North America. It was long included in the superspecies Athyrium filix-femina, but is now largely recognized as a distinct species.

Athyrium angustum has a more southern counterpart — Athyrium asplenioides, the southern lady fern — that is very similar. The latter has a broader frond, especially at the base.

== Description ==
Like other species in the genus Athyrium, A. angustum features light green fronds which grow in clumps typically 2-3 feet tall. One frond may have 20-30 pairs of non-opposite pinna. A. angustum is difficult to distinguish from its close relatives, but is proposed to be identifiable by having stipes with lengths 1-1.5x the frond length (as opposed to the relatively longer stipes of A. asplenioides) and narrower fronds. The rootstock is considered slow-growing compared to A. asplenoides, leading to more distinctive clustering of the fronds, but less clustering than in A. filix-femina. The scales grow up to 1 cm long and 1.5 mm wide, and are linear-lanceolate with a wide base.

== Similar species ==
Athyrium angustum is very similar in appearance to Athyrium asplenioides, to the point that there has long been a debate in the scientific community as to whether they were distinct species or only regional subspecies or varietals of A. filix-femina.

In 1917, F. K. Butters published a study aiming to distinguish species of ferns by their "technical characters" (i.e. the structure of their spores, sporangia, sori, and scales) as opposed to "superficial characters" such as the shapes of the fronds, and concluded that A. angustum was indeed a distinct species. He describes A. asplenioides as having relatively longer stipes relative to the fronds compared to A. angustum and broader fronds. In contrast, one observer remarked that, when using Butters' classification system, comparing frond shapes enabled reliable classification, but comparing stipe lengths was "rather misleading" because sometimes the A. angustum stipes were longer than expected and could morphologically overlap with A. asplenioides.

The range of A. angustum is generally more northerly than that of A. asplenioides, but their distribution overlaps significantly from southern New England to Tennessee and North Carolina, complicating identification in this region.

Taxonomy for these two species (and their close relatives, which are nonetheless not as often confused in the field due to their more distinct ranges) has been described as "difficult and controversial" due to their similar appearances.

== Classification ==
Due to its similarity in appearance to both Athyrium filix-femina and Athyrium asplenioides, it was unclear for a long time whether A. angustum was a separate species or a subspecies or varietal of A. filix-femina. In 1917 F. K. Butters argued that based on careful structural analysis the three species should be considered distinct, and recent electron-microscope analysis of spores, allozyme analysis, and phylogenetic analysis have supported this distinction, which is accepted by some authorities. However, some sources still style A. angustum as a subspecies of A. filix-femina, including ITIS which does not consider A. angustum to be an accepted taxon and views it as a varietal of A. filix-femina.

== Distribution ==
A. angustum is distributed broadly across the northeast of North America, ranging from Labrador to Manitoba in the north and south potentially as far as Tennessee and North Carolina, although older authors limited the southern border of its range to Pennsylvania and northern Missouri.

== Cultivation ==
Athyrium angustum has been described as "small but easy-to-grow" for shady landscaped areas, including near streams or ponds.
