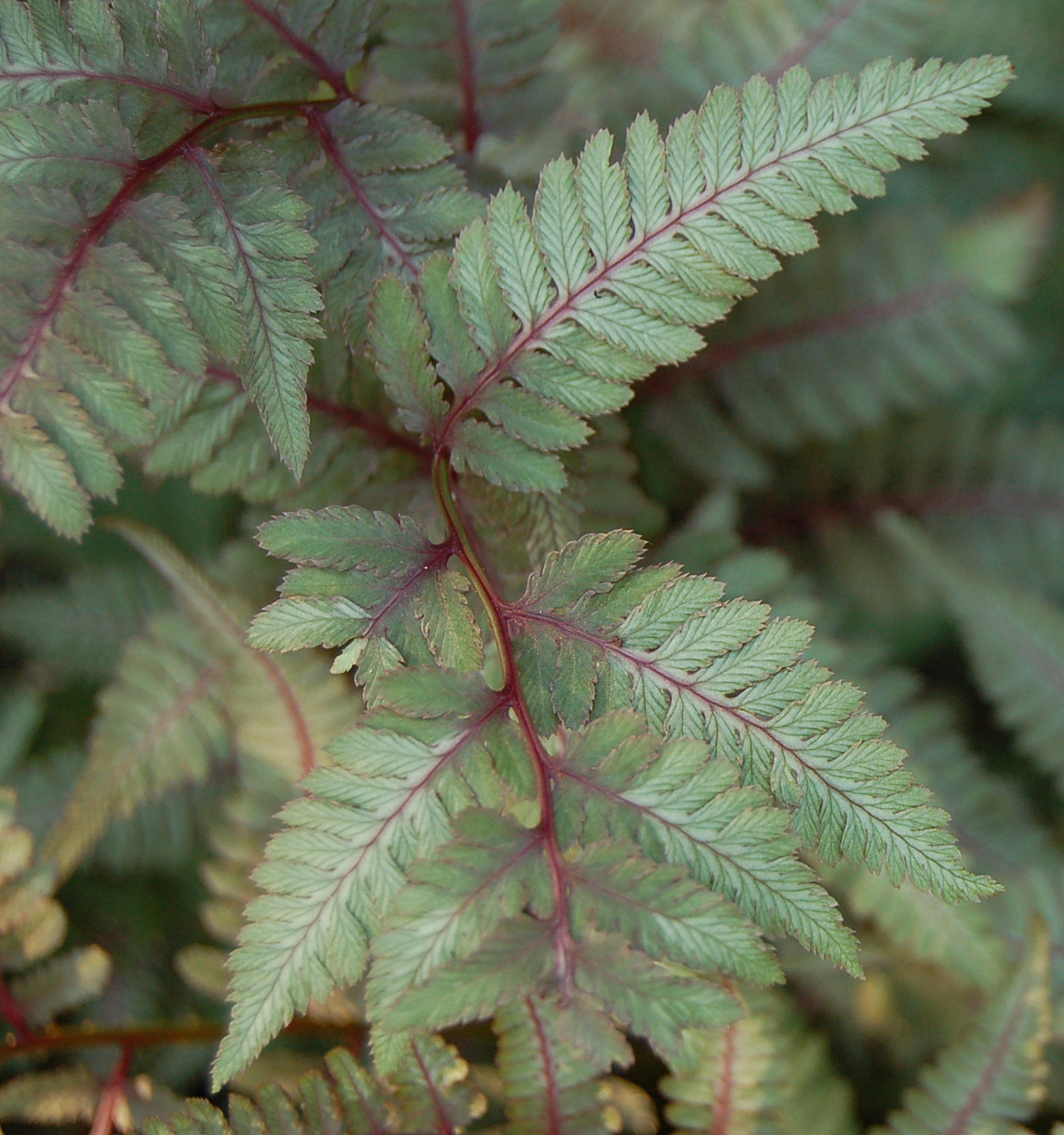
- Athyrium niponicum 'Pictum'

Scientific classification
- Kingdom: Plantae
- Clade: Tracheophytes
- Division: Polypodiophyta
- Class: Polypodiopsida
- Order: Polypodiales
- Suborder: Aspleniineae
- Family: Athyriaceae
- Genus: Athyrium
- Species: A. niponicum

Binomial name
- Athyrium niponicum (Mett.) Hance

= Athyrium niponicum =

Species of plant

Athyrium niponicum, the Japanese painted fern, is a species of fern native to eastern Asia.

This species was redefined as a member of genus Anisocampium in 2011 based on phylogenetic analyses, but the genus has since been sunk into Athyrium.

This deciduous fern has a creeping rhizome and a tuft-shape array of fronds. The fronds are variable in length, generally 30 to 75 centimeters long but occasionally over a meter in length. They have alternately arranged, subdivided pinnae. The spore-bearing sori on the undersides of the fertile pinnae are variable in shape, being "oblong, hooked, J-shaped, or horseshoe-shaped".

The Latin specific epithet niponicum means "relating to Japan (Nippon)".

This is a commonly cultivated fern, especially A. niponicum var. pictum. It thrives in many kinds of shady garden conditions and produces thick colonies of gray-green fronds with reddish midribs. 'Pictum' is also considered to be a cultivar; varieties and cultivars are bred to achieve midribs in many shades of red.

A. niponicum var. pictum has gained the Royal Horticultural Society's Award of Garden Merit. as has the cultivar 'Silver Falls'.

== Gallery ==
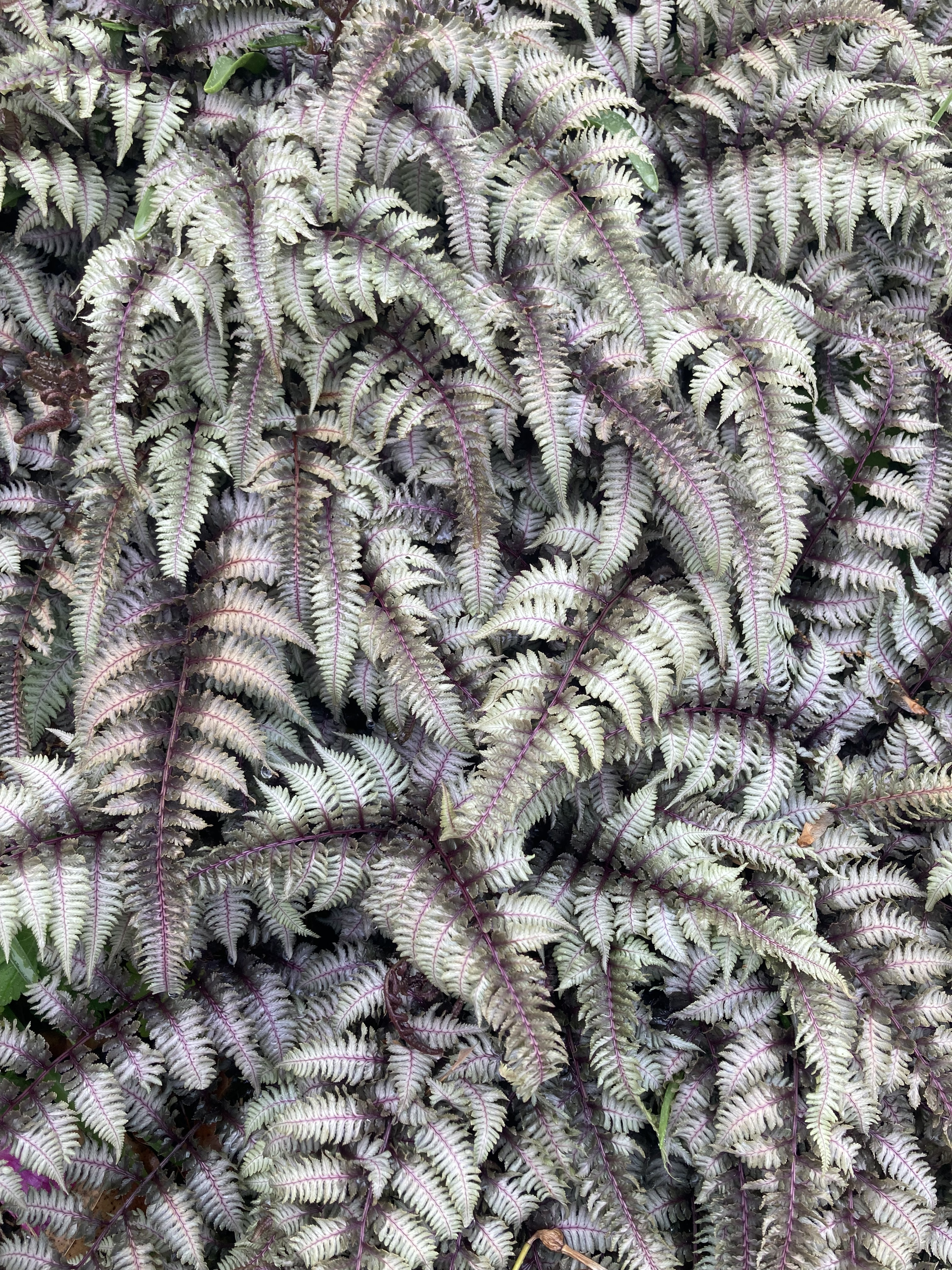
A niponicum var. pictum on NYC's Highline.

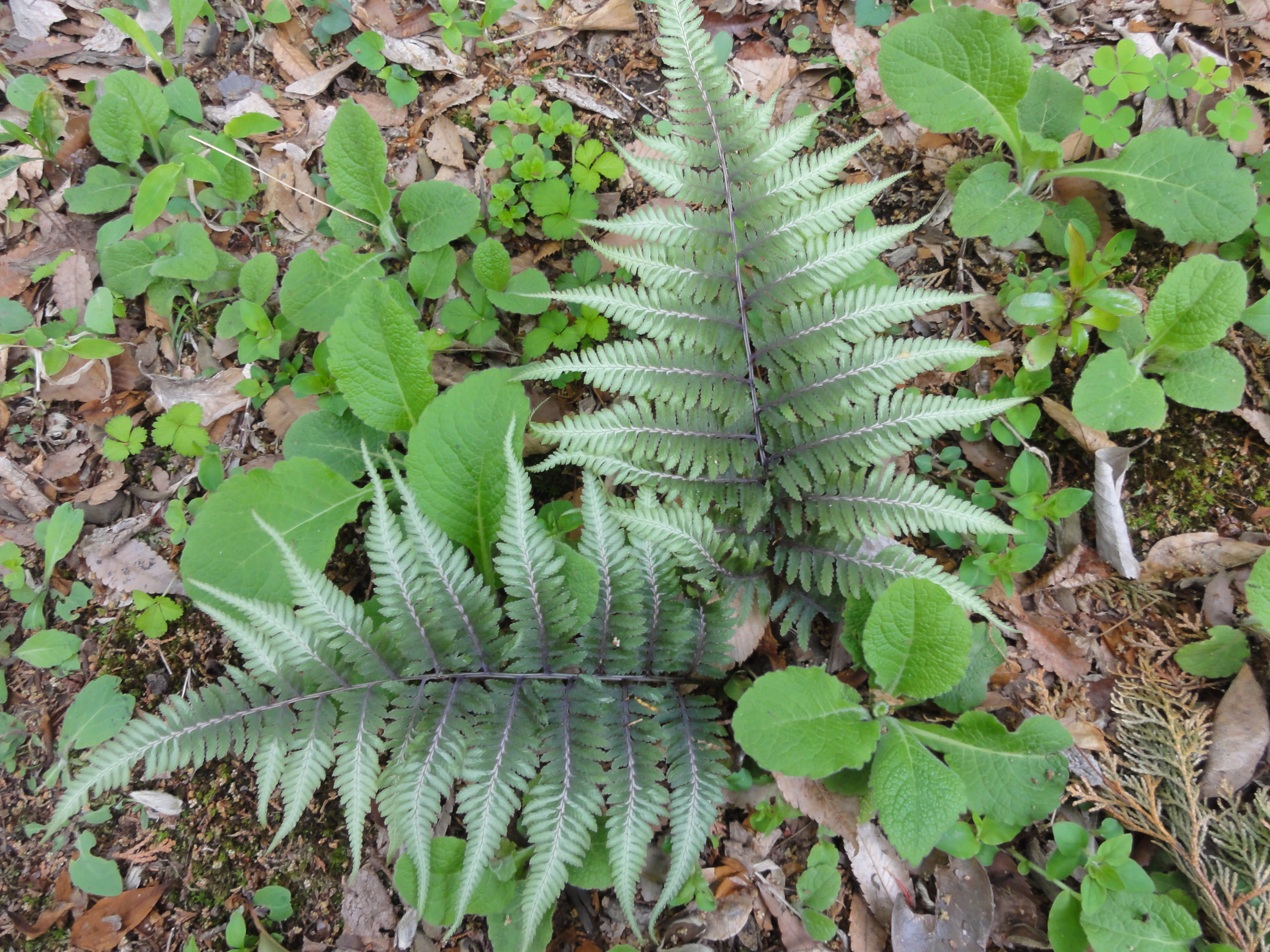

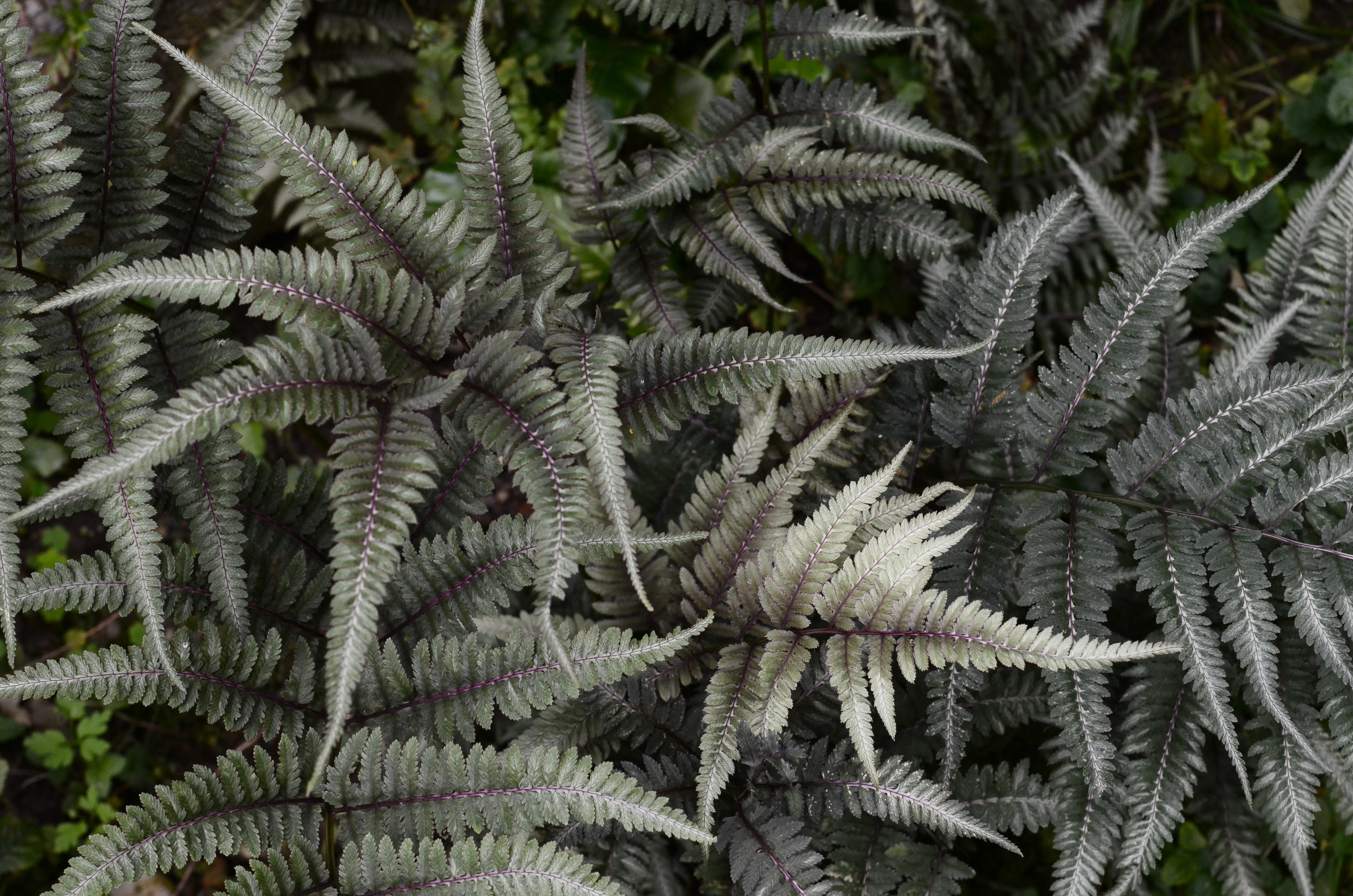

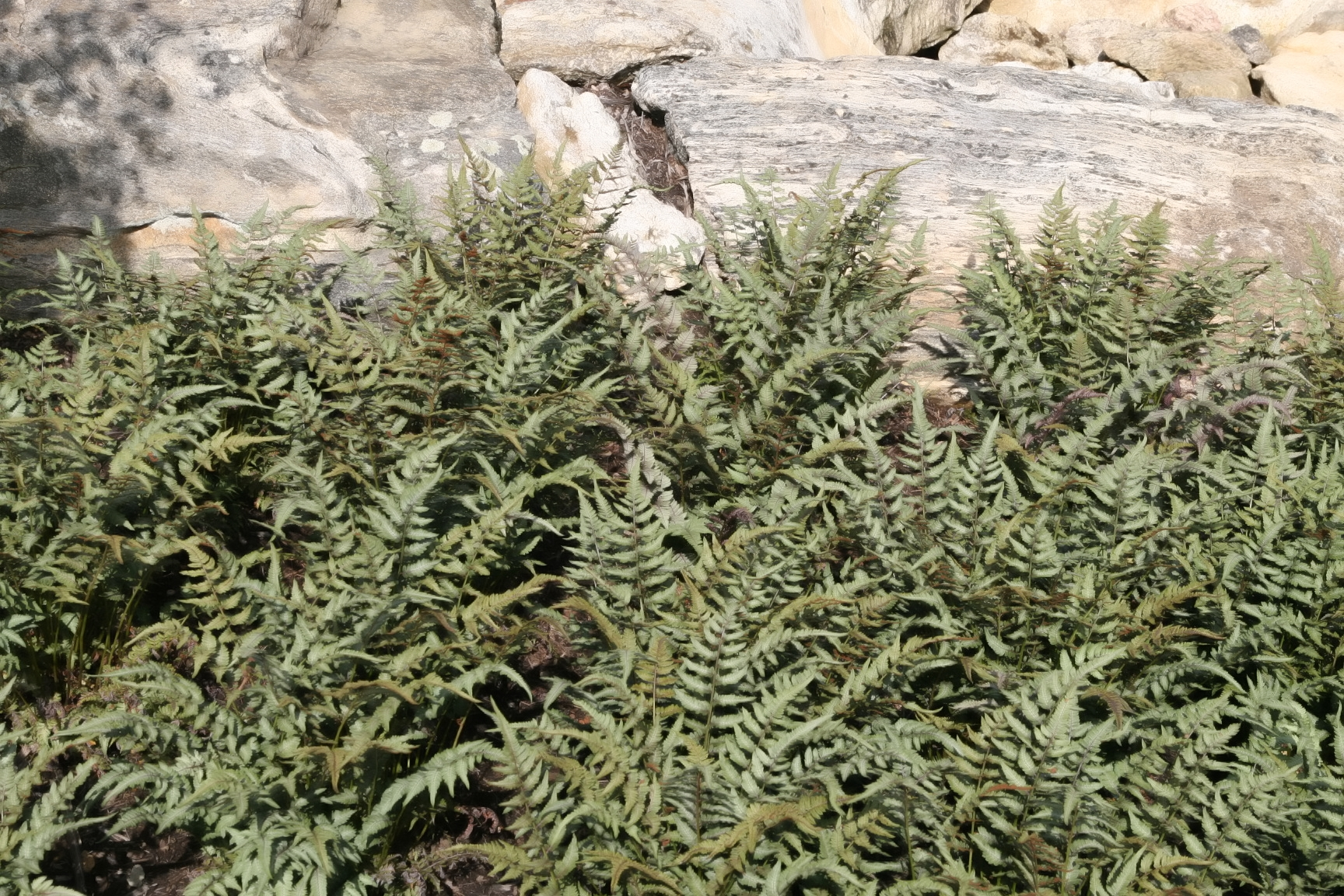
