= Athyrium medium =

Conservation status
- Least Concern (IUCN 3.1)

Scientific classification
- Kingdom: Plantae
- Clade: Tracheophytes
- Division: Polypodiophyta
- Class: Polypodiopsida
- Order: Polypodiales
- Suborder: Aspleniineae
- Family: Athyriaceae
- Genus: Athyrium
- Species: A. medium

Binomial name
- Athyrium medium (Carmich.) T.Moore

Species of fern

Athyrium medium is a species of fern in the family Athyriaceae. It is found in Tristan da Cunha. Its natural habitat is subantarctic shrubland.
