= S. purpurascens =

S. purpurascens may refer to:

- Sphenarium purpurascens, the chapulín de la milpa or gafanhoto-do-milho, a grasshoppers species found in Mexico and Guatemala
- Sthenopis purpurascens, the four-spotted ghost moth, a moth species found in Canada and the United States
