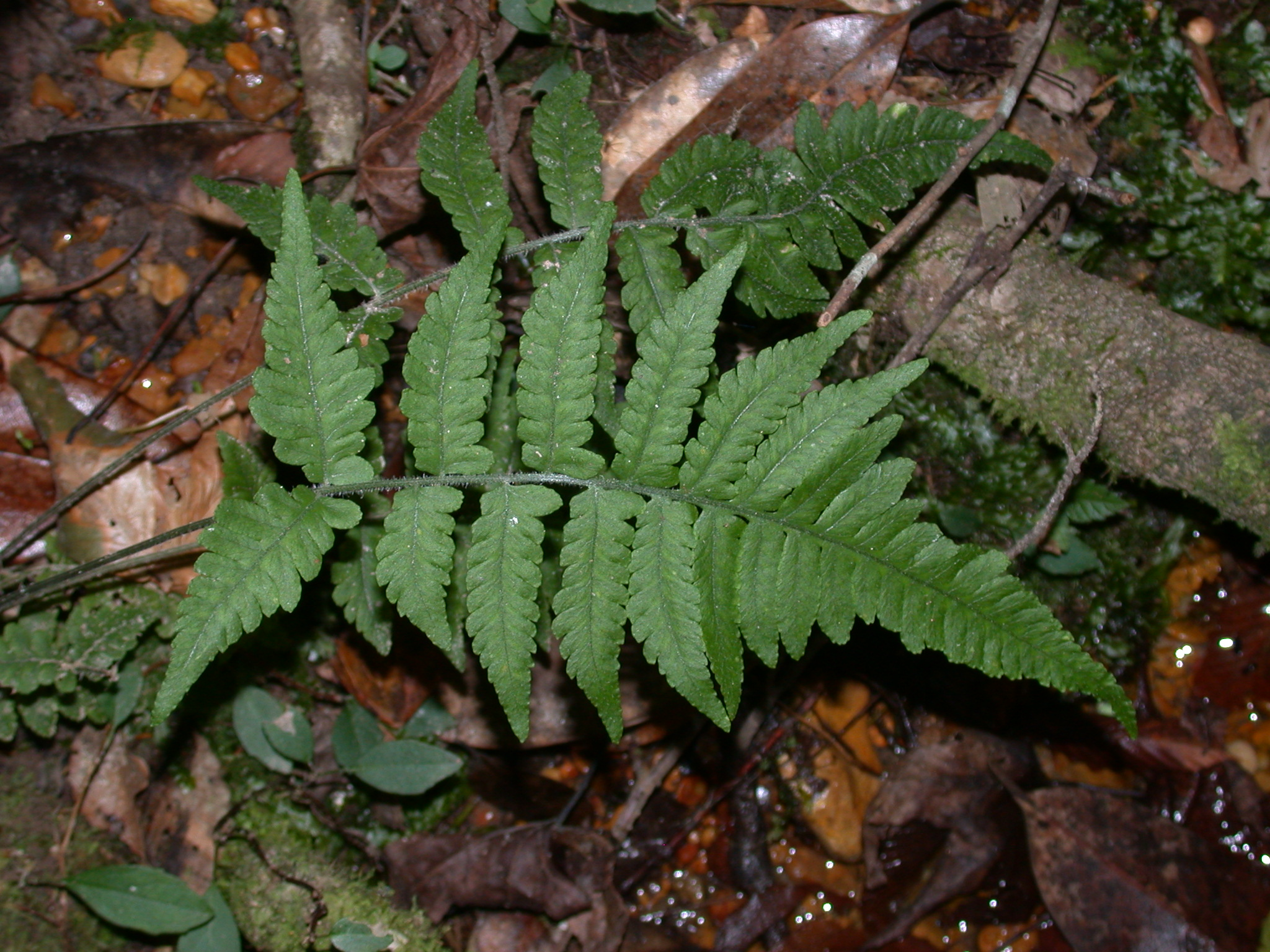

Scientific classification
- Kingdom: Plantae
- Clade: Tracheophytes
- Division: Polypodiophyta
- Class: Polypodiopsida
- Order: Polypodiales
- Suborder: Aspleniineae
- Family: Athyriaceae
- Genus: Deparia
- Species: D. petersenii

Binomial name
- Deparia petersenii (Kunze) M.Kato

= Deparia petersenii =

Species of fern

== Description ==
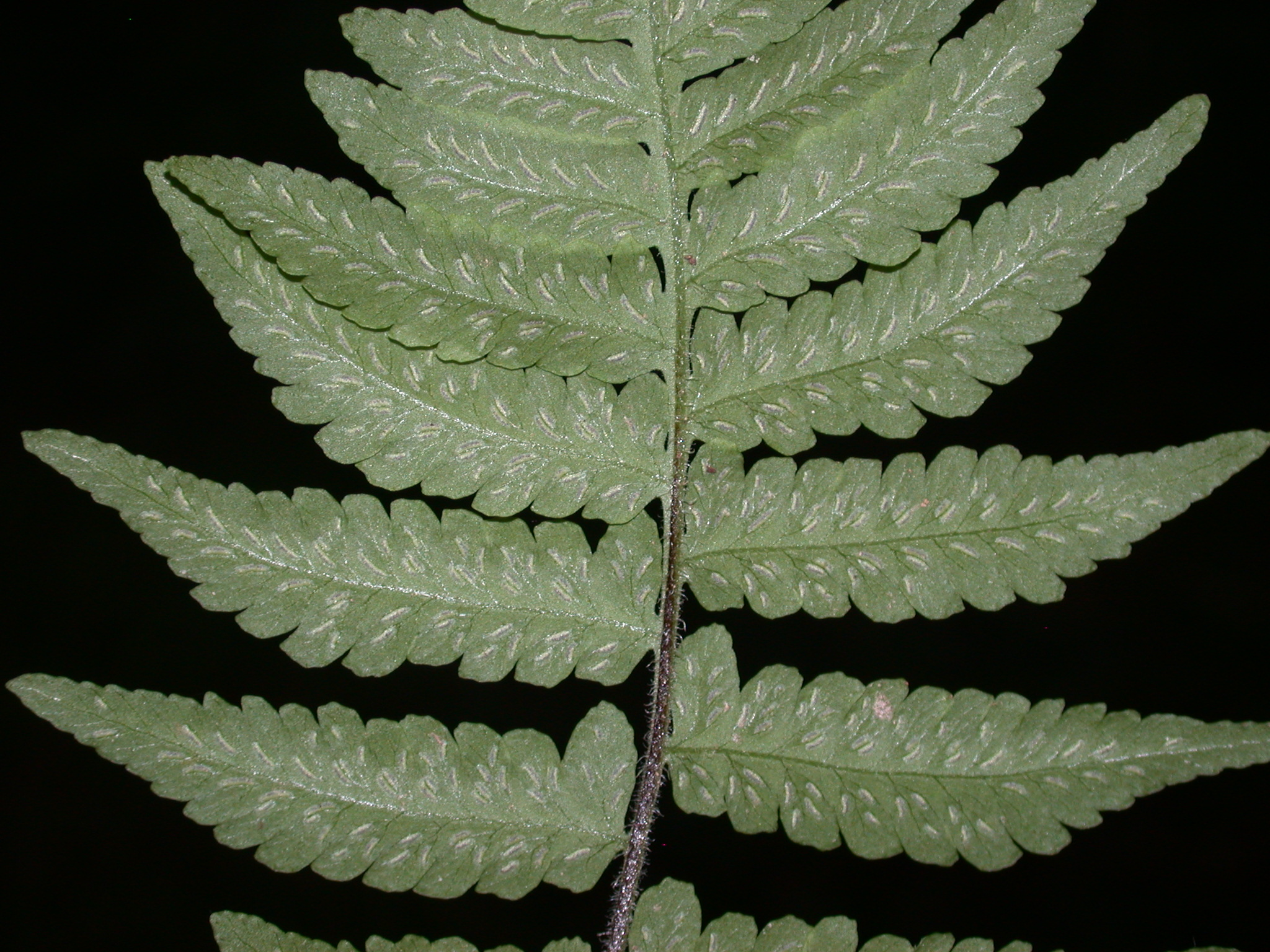

Deparia petersenii, commonly known as the Japanese lady fern, is a species of fern that generally grows between 12 and 24 inches (300 and 610 mm) in length and has a width of between 12 and 18 inches (300 and 460 mm). This fern does not have any flowers and can be easily identifiable having gray hairs that grow on the underside of the leaves. This perennial fern is an aggressive fast growing invasive species known for long rhizomes and ability to form a thick ground cover. D. petersenii is sometimes cultivated and can be purchased online because it is not regulated or prohibited.

== Distribution ==
This species has a large distribution in East Asia (Southwest, South Central and East China, Taiwan, South Korea, southern Japan, Bonin and Volcano Islands), South Asia (India, Sri Lanka, Pakistan, Bhutan, Nepal) and Southeast Asia south to Australia, New Zealand and Polynesia.

Beyond its native range, D. petersenii is considered an invasive species in Madeira, the Azores, southeastern USA, the Hawaiian Islands, southeastern Brazil and Réunion. In the United States, it is present throughout Louisiana, Mississippi, Florida, Arkansas, Georgia, and Hawaii with less than fifty sightings between the six states according to the Invasive Plant Atlas of the United States.
