= Athyrium haleakalae =

Scientific classification
- Kingdom: Plantae
- Clade: Tracheophytes
- Division: Polypodiophyta
- Class: Polypodiopsida
- Order: Polypodiales
- Suborder: Aspleniineae
- Family: Athyriaceae
- Genus: Athyrium
- Species: A. haleakalae

Binomial name
- Athyrium haleakalae K.R.Wood & W.L.Wagner

Species of fern

Athyrium haleakalae one of six single-island endemic fern or lycophyte taxon found on Maui Island, Hawaii. It survives on vertical stream walls, especially near waterfalls. It can withstand flooding. It was identified and described in 2017 by Kenneth Wood and Warren Wagner.
