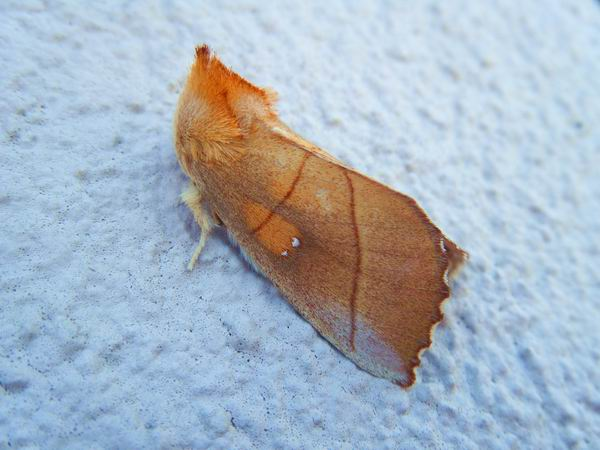
- Sthenopis argenteomaculatus - Body length measured approximately 1

Scientific classification
- Domain: Eukaryota
- Kingdom: Animalia
- Phylum: Arthropoda
- Class: Insecta
- Order: Lepidoptera
- Family: Hepialidae
- Genus: Sthenopis; Packard, 1865

Species
- See text.

Synonyms
- Stenopis Pagenstecher, 1909

= Sthenopis =

Genus of moths

Sthenopis is a genus of moths of the family Hepialidae. There are eight described species found in North America and China.

== Species ==
- Sthenopis argenteomaculatus (silver-spotted ghost moth) – Canada/United States

- Recorded food plants: Alnus, Betula, Salix

- Sthenopis auratus (gold-spotted ghost moth) – United States

- Recorded food plants: Athyrium, Dryopteris, Matteuccia

- Sthenopis bouvieri – China
- Sthenopis dirschi – China
- Sthenopis purpurascens – Canada/United States

- Recorded food plants: Populus, Salix

- Sthenopis regius – China
- Sthenopis roseus – China
- Sthenopis thule (willow ghost moth) – Canada/United States

- Food plant: Salix
