= Athyrium arisanense =

Scientific classification
- Kingdom: Plantae
- Clade: Tracheophytes
- Division: Polypodiophyta
- Class: Polypodiopsida
- Order: Polypodiales
- Suborder: Aspleniineae
- Family: Athyriaceae
- Genus: Athyrium
- Species: A. arisanense

Binomial name
- Athyrium arisanense (Hayata) Tagawa

Species of plant

Athyrium arisanense is a fern within the Athyriaceae family, endemic to Taiwan. Its common Chinese name (Chinese: 阿里山蹄盖蕨) and its species name refer to the Alishan Range.
