= Athyrium auriculatum =

Scientific classification
- Kingdom: Plantae
- Clade: Tracheophytes
- Division: Polypodiophyta
- Class: Polypodiopsida
- Order: Polypodiales
- Suborder: Aspleniineae
- Family: Athyriaceae
- Genus: Athyrium
- Species: A. auriculatum

Binomial name
- Athyrium auriculatum Serizawa

Species of fern

Athyrium auriculatum is a fern species endemic to Taiwan. This fern characterized by short, erect stems covered with black-brown to black, narrowly lanceolate scales. The leaves are clustered at the top, with leaf stalks measuring 15–25 cm (5.9–9.8 in) in length and bearing scales at the base similar to those at the stem tip. The leaf blades are triangular, 20–25 cm (7.9–9.8 in) long, 16–20 cm (6.3–7.9 in) wide, with a two-pinnate compound structure. They are papery in texture, and both the leaf and pinna axes are covered with club-shaped glandular hairs. The pinnae are distinctly stalked, and the surface of the pinna axis features hard, short spines. Small pinnae emerge first on the base of the larger pinnae, measuring 15–22 mm (9/16–7/8 in) in length and 8–10 mm (5/16–3/8 in) in width, with rounded and slightly lobed tips. The spore membranes are short, linear, occasionally appearing J-shaped, and are located near the small pinna axis. This fern is a terrestrial, growing in semi-shade under the forest or on the edge of the forest.
