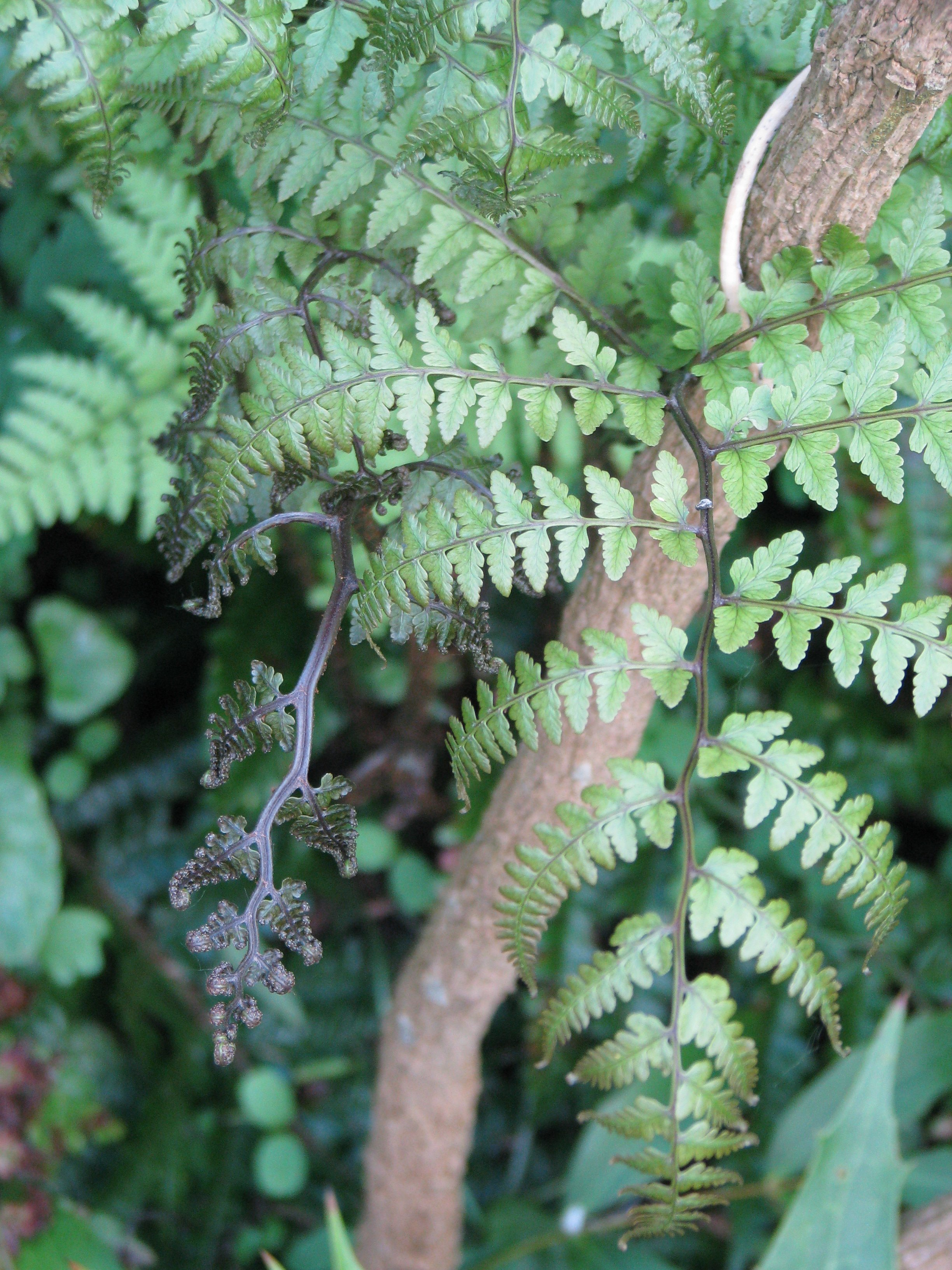

Scientific classification
- Kingdom: Plantae
- Clade: Tracheophytes
- Division: Polypodiophyta
- Class: Polypodiopsida
- Order: Polypodiales
- Suborder: Aspleniineae
- Family: Athyriaceae
- Genus: Athyrium
- Species: A. otophorum

Binomial name
- Athyrium otophorum (Miq.) Koidz.

= Athyrium otophorum =

Species of fern

Athyrium otophorum, the eared lady fern, is a species of fern in the family Athyriaceae, native to Japan and East Asia. It is deciduous and grows in a tufted oval formation to 50 centimetres (20 in) tall and wide. The triangular fronds open pale green before turning grey-green with maroon stems. Hardy down to −10 °C (14 °F) it is suitable for cultivation in any moist, partially-shaded spot with good drainage.

In cultivation in the United Kingdom, this plant has gained the Royal Horticultural Society's Award of Garden Merit, as has the variety A. otophorum var. okanum.
