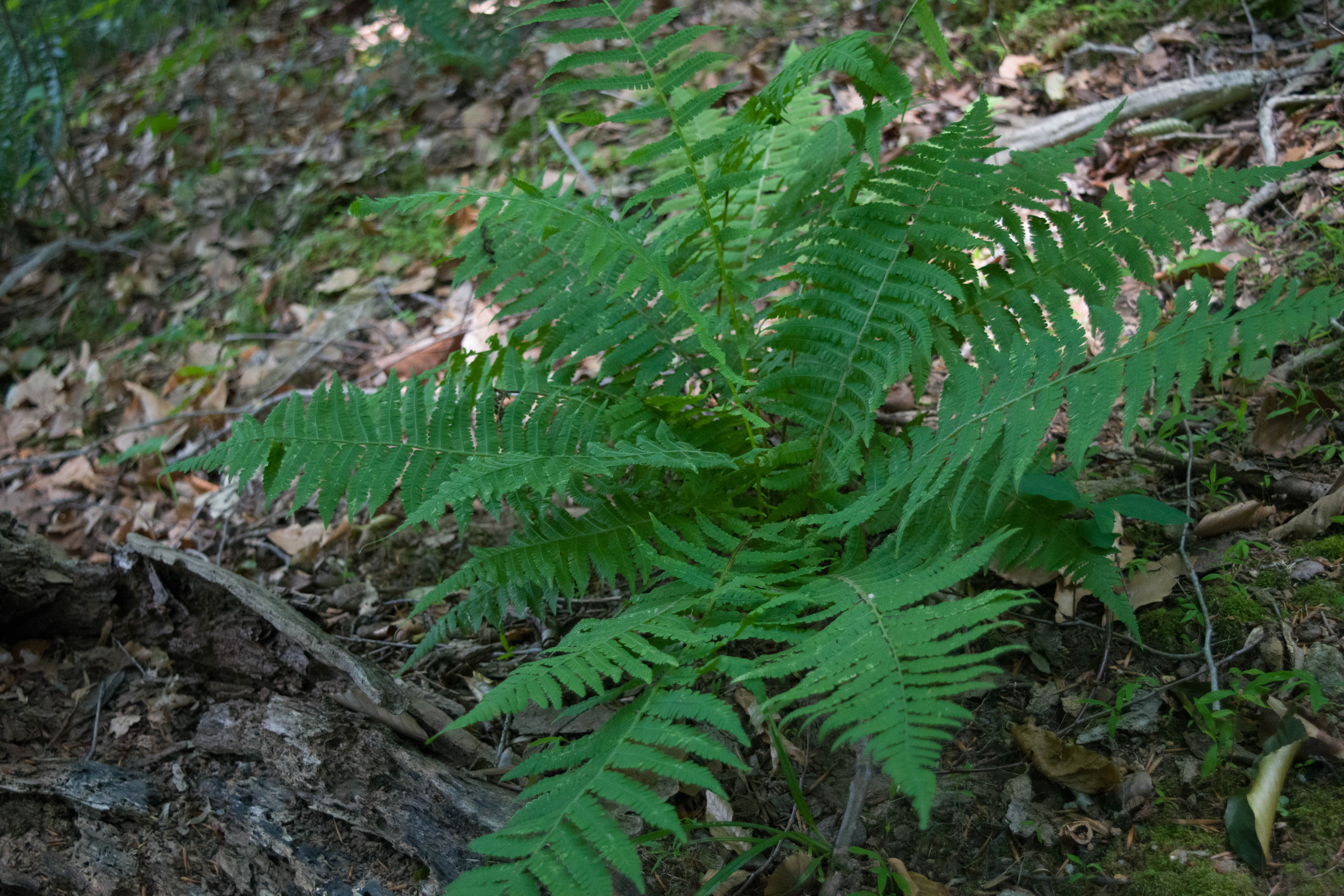

Conservation status
- Secure (NatureServe)

Scientific classification
- Kingdom: Plantae
- Clade: Embryophytes
- Clade: Tracheophytes
- Division: Polypodiophyta
- Class: Polypodiopsida
- Order: Polypodiales
- Suborder: Aspleniineae
- Family: Athyriaceae
- Genus: Deparia
- Species: D. acrostichoides

Binomial name
- Deparia acrostichoides (Sw.) M. Kato
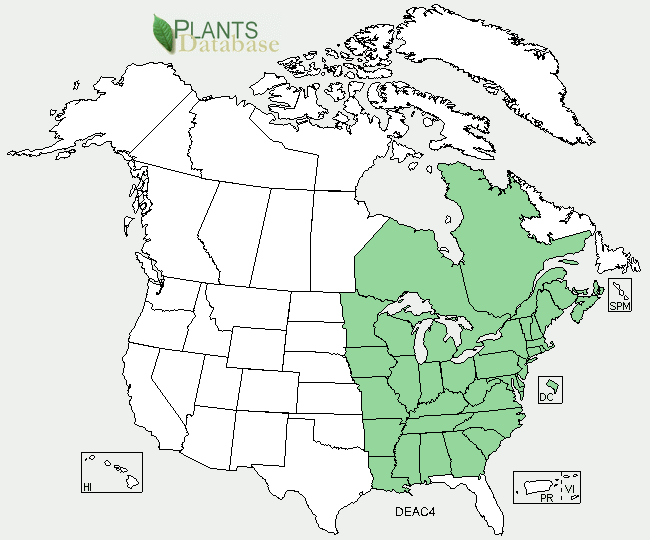
- Range within North America

Synonyms
- Asplenium acrostichoides Sw.; Asplenium thelypterioides Michx.; Athyrium acrostichoides (Swartz) Diels; Athyrium thelypterioides (Michx.) Desv.; Diplazium acrostichoides (Swartz) Butters; Diplazium thelypteroides (Michx.) C. Presl; Lunathyrium acrostichoides (Sw.) Ching

= Deparia acrostichoides =

Silvery glade fern

Species of fern

Deparia acrostichoides, commonly called silvery glade fern or silvery spleenwort, is a perennial species of fern. Its range includes much of the eastern United States and Canada, from Ontario to Nova Scotia and Georgia to Louisiana, as well as eastern Asia in China, Russia, Japan and Korea. The name silvery comes from the fact that the indusia on the underside of the leaf have a silver color when the sori are close to ripening.

== Description ==
Silvery spleenwort has pinnately divided yellowish green leaves arising from a stout, green, slightly brown hairy and scaly stem. The stem is typically grooved on the upper side, much shorter than the leaf blade and darker colored near its base, being dark red or brown; as the stem reaches the leaflets it becomes a pale green color. The leaves are broadest in the middle with a long pointed tip and tapering base, with the lowest pair of leaflets generally pointing downward. The tapering and downward pointed bottom leaves are a diagnostic characteristic for helping to distinguish this fern from similar ferns.

The leaves are 30–80 cm (12–31 in) long and 10–25 cm (3.9–9.8 in) wide; their underside is covered in fuzzy yellow-green hairs. There are approximately 18 leaflets on a leaf, which are approximately 15 cm (5.9 in) long and 1 cm (0.39 in) wide and relatively straight. The leaflets are themselves cut into oblong sub-leaflets which may have a blunt or rounded tip. The sterile and fertile leaflets are similar in form. The fertile leaves bear sori on the underside of the leaves and are silvery green at first but later become light brown as they ripen. The sori are pinnately arranged on the subleafets in a pattern which follows the veination; they are typically straight or slightly curved with a thick indusia with an entire margin. The fertile pinnae can be described as acrostichoid as the sporangia covers almost the entirety of the underside of the leaf surface. Acrostichoid is also the term from which D. acrostichoides derives its species name.

It often forms extensive colonies, growing from creeping roots. Silvery spleenwort is a common fern in stream bottoms, moist woods, and cool shaded areas throughout its range.

== Gallery ==
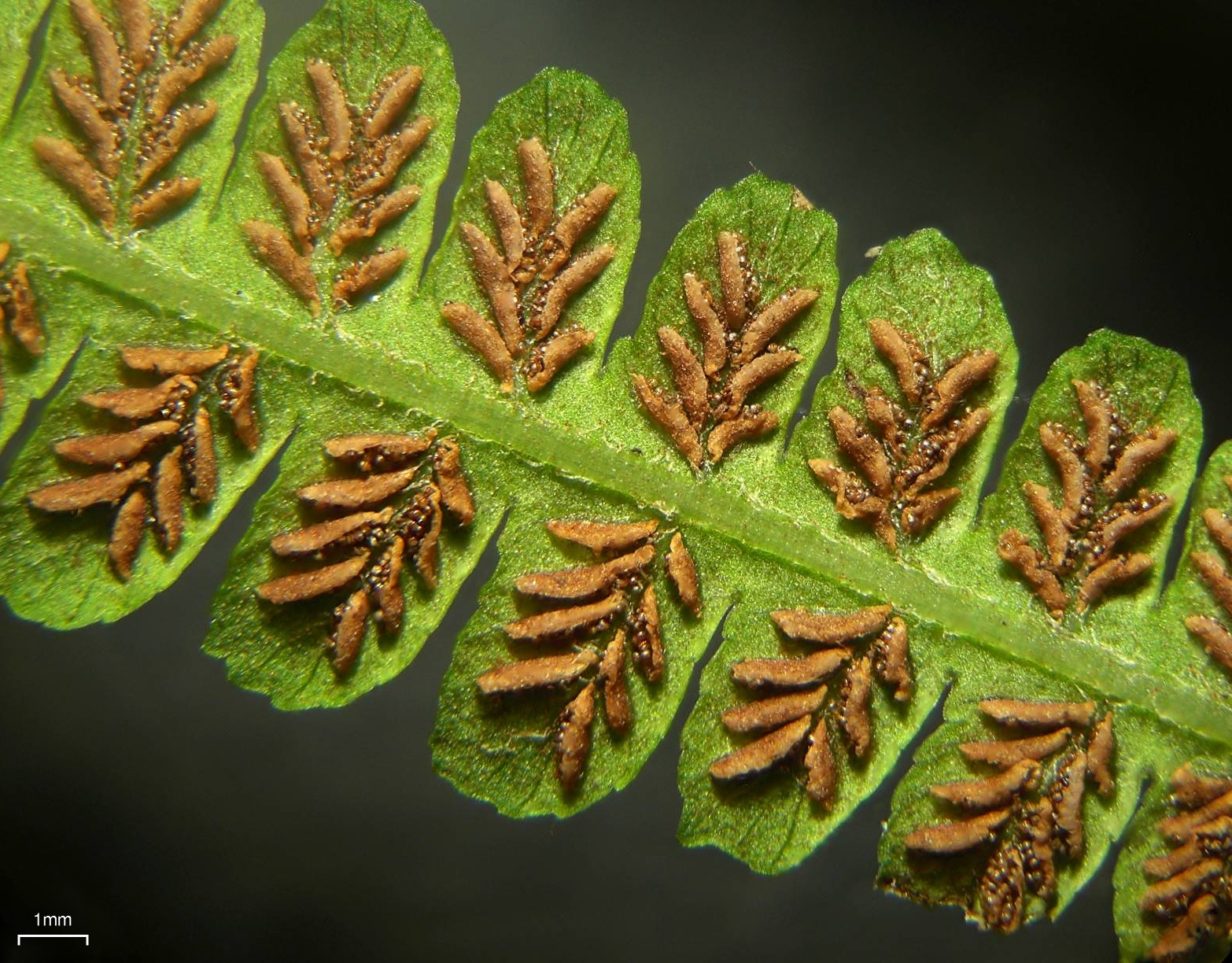
Showing ripened sori and indusia

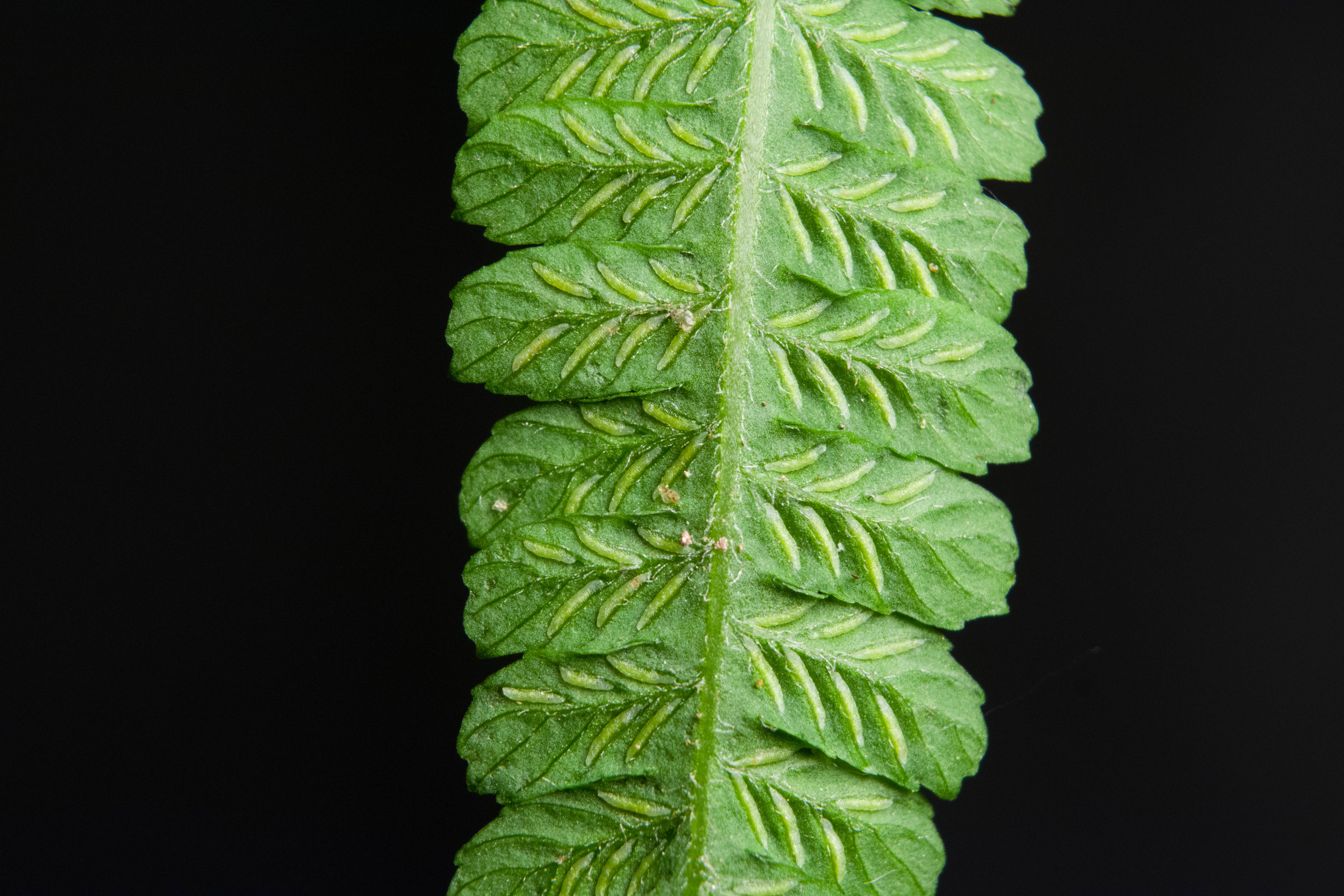
Showing unriped silvery indusia which gives this species its name

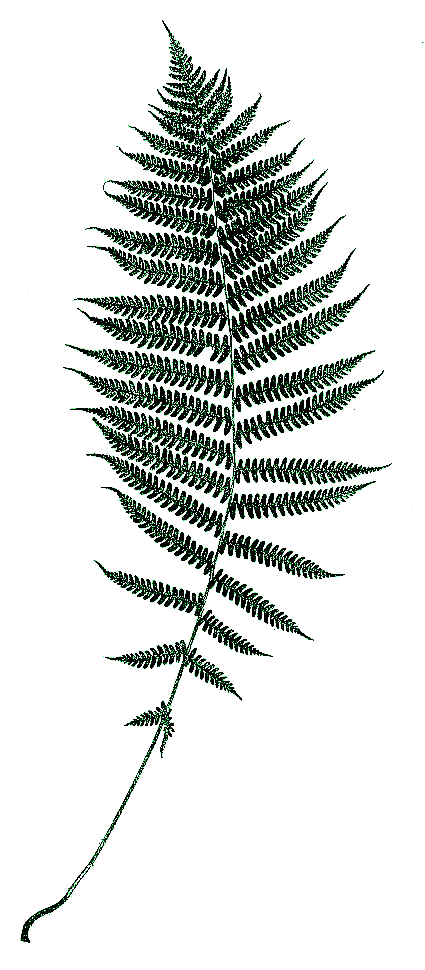
Leaf shape

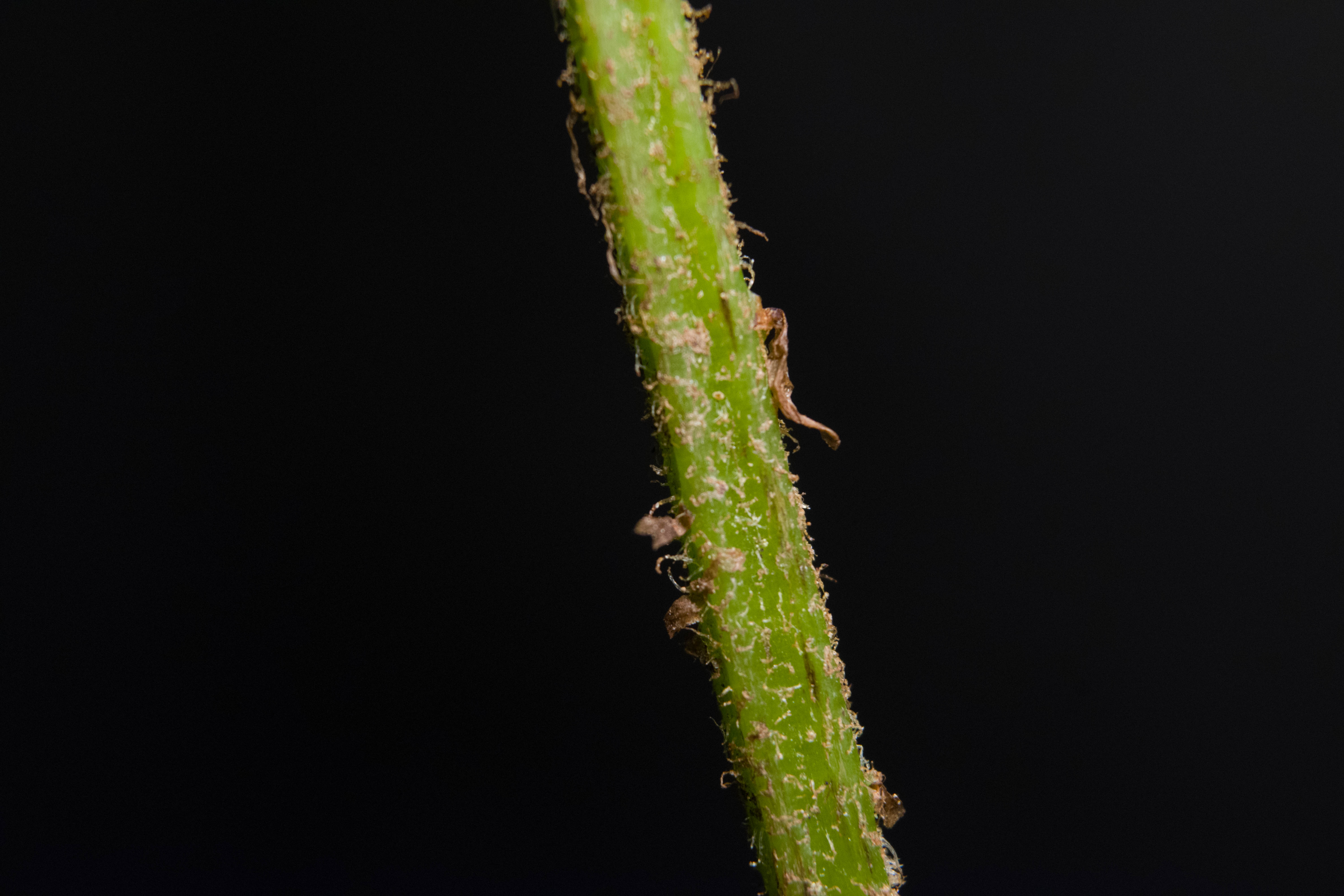
Stipe texture
