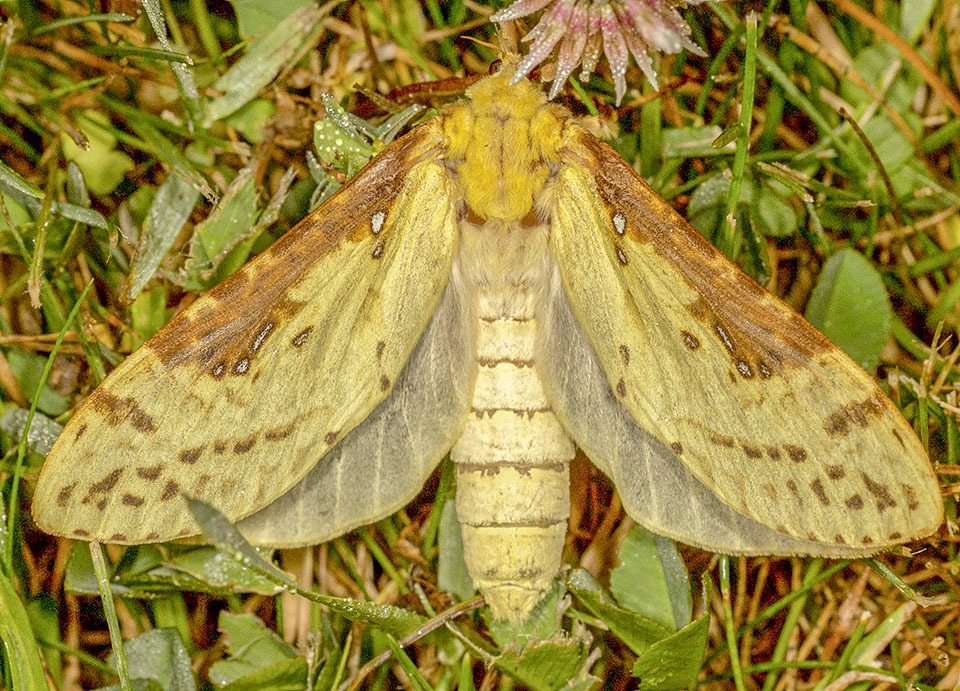
- S. thule in Crystal Beach, Ottawa, Canada

Scientific classification
- Domain: Eukaryota
- Kingdom: Animalia
- Phylum: Arthropoda
- Class: Insecta
- Order: Lepidoptera
- Family: Hepialidae
- Genus: Sthenopis
- Species: S. thule

Binomial name
- Sthenopis thule (Strecker, 1875)

Synonyms
- Hepialus thule Strecker, 1875

= Sthenopis thule =

Species of moth

Sthenopis thule, the willow ghost moth, is a species of moth of the family Hepialidae. It was described by Strecker in 1875, and is known from Canada and the United States, including Ontario, Quebec and Saskatchewan.

The food plant for this species is Salix. They bore in the roots of their host plant. The life cycle probably takes two years to complete.
