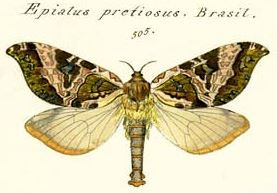

Scientific classification
- Domain: Eukaryota
- Kingdom: Animalia
- Phylum: Arthropoda
- Class: Insecta
- Order: Lepidoptera
- Family: Hepialidae
- Genus: Sthenopis
- Species: S. pretiosus

Binomial name
- Sthenopis pretiosus (Herrich-Schäffer, 1856)

Synonyms
- Hepialus auratus Grote, 1878; Sthenopis auratus Grote, 1878; Epialus pretiosus Herrich-Schäffer, 1856; Phassus eldorado Pfitzner, 1906

= Sthenopis pretiosus =

Species of moth

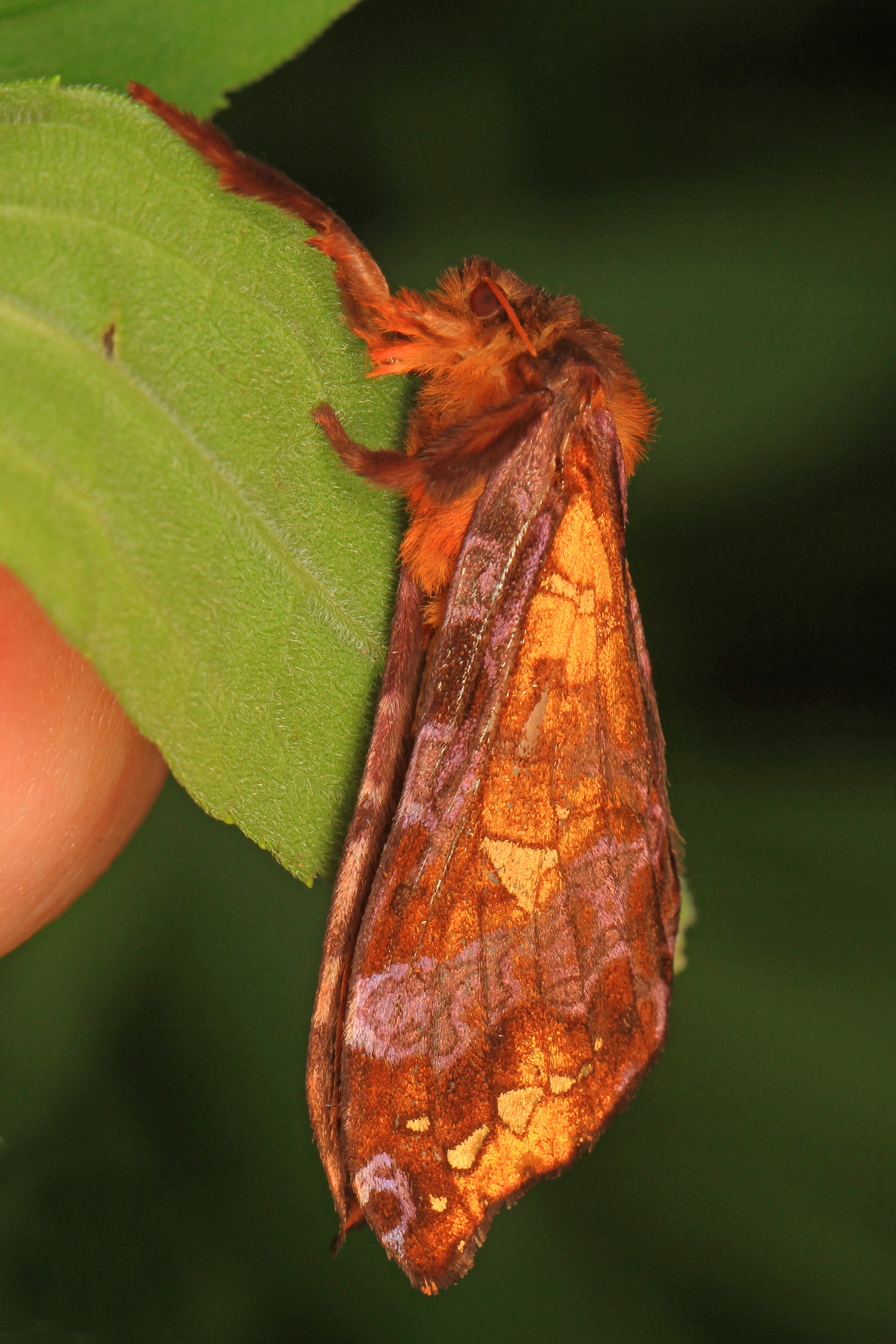
Gold-spotted ghost moth in Friendsville, Maryland, US

Sthenopis pretiosus, the gold-spotted ghost moth, is a species of moth of the family Hepialidae. It was first described by Gottlieb August Wilhelm Herrich-Schäffer in 1856. It can be found in found Brazil, Venezuela and in the eastern United States and south-eastern Canada.

== Naming history ==
Sthenopis pretiosus was independently discovered, named and described at least three times:

1. It was first found in Brazil and described by Gottlieb August Wilhelm Herrich-Schäffer in 1856 who called it Epialus pretiosus. The type specimen of E. pretiosus has not been located.
2. It was also found in the north-eastern United States and south-eastern Canada and described by Augustus Radcliffe Grote in 1878, who called it Hepialus auratus which become Sthenopis auratus.
3. It was also found in Venezuela and described by Rudolf Pfitzner in 1906, who called it Phassus eldorado. Later Pfitzner published an illustration of Phassus eldorado. The holotype of P. eldorado is at the Senckenberg Museum in Frankfurt am Main.

In 2015, Carlos G. C. Mielke and John R. Grehan concluded that Hepialus auratus Grote, 1878 and Phassus eldorado Pfitzner, 1906 are junior and subjective synonymies of Sthenopis pretiosus Herrich-Schäffer, [1856], and applied the rule of priority to change the names of H. auratus and P. eldorado to Sthenopis pretiosus.

== Description ==
The wingspan is 60–70 mm.

Food plants for this species include Athyrium, Dryopteris, and Matteuccia.

== Bibliography ==
- Kirby, W. F. 1892. A Synonymic Catalogue of Lepidoptera Heterocera (Moths). Vol. I, Sphinges and Bombyces. — London (Guerney & Jackson), Berlin (R. Friedländer), xii + 951 pp.
- Mielke, C.G.C. & Grehan, J. R. (2012): Catalogue of the Latin American Hepialidae with taxonomic remarks (Lepidoptera). Nachrichten des Entomologischen Vereins Apollo (N.F.)32: 131–158.
- Mielke, C.G.C. & Grehan, J.R. 2016. Description of a new species of Phassus Walker, 1856 from Costa Rica, Pallas, gen. n., with a new species from Guatemala, and taxonomic notes on Sthenopis Packard, [1865] (Lepidoptera, Hepialidae). European Journal of Entomology 7: 113-134.
- Nielsen, E. S. & Robinson, G. S. 1983. Ghost moths of southern South America (Lepidoptera: Hepialidae). Entomograph 4: 1–192.
- Nielsen, E. S., Robinson, G. S. & Wagner, D. L. 2000. Ghost-moths of the world: a global inventory and bibliography of the Exoporia (Mnesarchaeoidea and Hepialoidea) (Lepidoptera). Journal of Natural History, London 34: 823–878.
- Robinson, G.S. & Nielsen, E. S. 1984. Hepialidae. In Heppner, J. B. (ed.), Atlas of Neotropical Lepidoptera. Checklist: Part 1. Micropterigoidea–Immoidea. — Den Haag (W. Junk), xxvii + 112 pp.
- Wagner, H. & Pfitzner, R. 1911. Hepialidae. In Aurivillius, C., & Wagner, H. (eds.), Lepidopterorum Catalogus 4. — Berlin (W. Junk), pp. 1–26.
