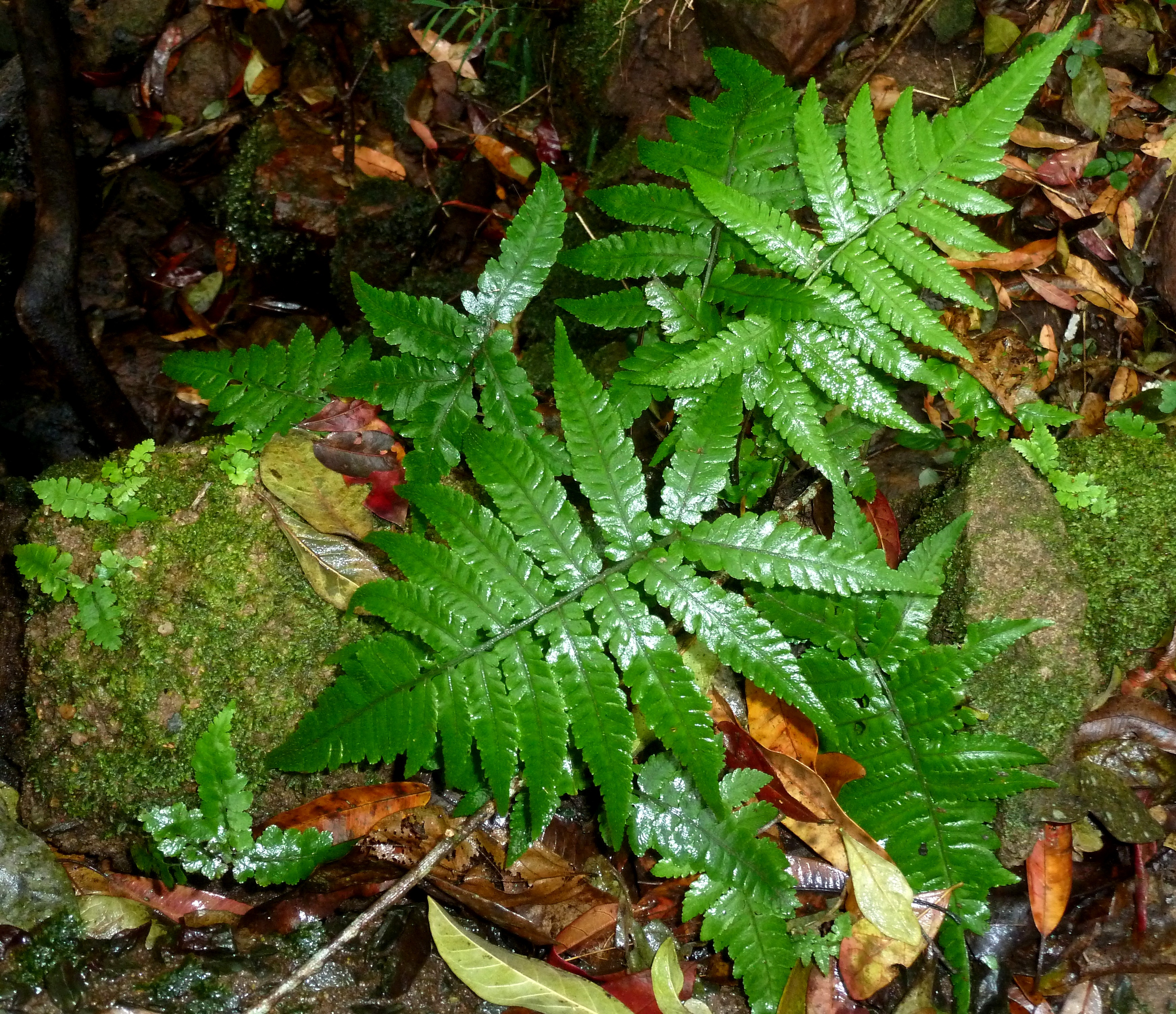
- Deparia japonica

Scientific classification
- Kingdom: Plantae
- Clade: Tracheophytes
- Division: Polypodiophyta
- Class: Polypodiopsida
- Order: Polypodiales
- Suborder: Aspleniineae
- Family: Athyriaceae
- Genus: Deparia; Hook. & Grev.

= Deparia =

Genus of ferns

Deparia (or the false spleenworts) is a genus of ferns. The Pteridophyte Phylogeny Group classification of 2016 (PPG I) places the genus in the family Athyriaceae, although other sources include it within an expanded Aspleniaceae or Woodsiaceae.

== Species ==
As of November 2019, the Checklist of Ferns and Lycophytes of the World accepted 79 species and 10 hybrids.

- Deparia abbreviata (W.M.Chu) Z.R.He
- Deparia acrostichoides (Sw.) M.Kato
- Deparia allantodioides (Bedd.) M.Kato
- Deparia auriculata (W.M.Chu & Z.R.Wang) Z.R.Wang
- Deparia biserialis (Baker) M.Kato
- Deparia bonincola (Nakai) M.Kato
- Deparia boryana (Willd.) M.Kato
- Deparia brevipinna (Ching & K.H.Shing ex Z.R.Wang) Z.R.Wang
- Deparia cataracticola M.Kato
- Deparia chinensis (Ching) X.S.Guo & C.Du
- Deparia chingii J.X.Li & Xiao J.Li
- Deparia confluens (Kunze) M.Kato
- Deparia confusa Ching & Y.P.Hsu) Z.R.Wang
- Deparia conilii (Franch. & Sav.) M.Kato
- Deparia coreana (Christ) M.Kato – Korean tapering glade fern
- Deparia dawuense C.M.Kuo ined.
- Deparia dickasonii M.Kato
- Deparia dimorphophylla (Koidz.) M.Kato
- Deparia dolosa (Christ) M.Kato
- Deparia erecta (Z.R.Wang) M.Kato
- Deparia falcatipinnula (Z.R.Wang) Z.R.Wang
- Deparia fenzliana (Luerss.) M.Kato
- Deparia formosana (Rosenst.) R.Sano
- Deparia forsythii-majoris (C.Chr.) M.Kato
- Deparia giraldii (Christ) X.C.Zhang
- Deparia gordonii (Baker) M.Kato
- Deparia hainanensis (Ching) R.Sano
- Deparia henryi (Baker) M.Kato
- Deparia heterophlebia (Mett. ex Baker) R.Sano
- Deparia hirtirachis (Ching ex Z.R.Wang) Z.R.Wang
- Deparia japonica (Thunb.) M.Kato
- Deparia jinfoshanensis (Z.Y.Liu) Z.R.He
- Deparia jiulungensis (Ching) Z.R.Wang
- Deparia kaalaana (Copel.) M.Kato
- Deparia kiusiana (Koidz.) M.Kato
- Deparia lancea (Thunb.) Fraser-Jenk.
- Deparia liangshanensis (Ching ex Z.R.Wang) Z.R.Wang
- Deparia longipes (Ching) Shinohara
- Deparia longipilosa Rakotondr.
- Deparia ludingensis (Z.R.Wang & Li Bing Zhang) Z.R.Wang
- Deparia lushanensis (J.X.Li) Z.R.He
- Deparia macdonellii (Bedd.) M.Kato
- Deparia marginalis (Hillebr.) M.Kato
- Deparia marojejyensis (Tardieu) M.Kato
- Deparia membranacea (Ching & Z.Y.Liu) Fraser-Jenk.
- Deparia minamitanii Seriz.
- Deparia okuboana (Makino) M.Kato
- Deparia omeiensis (Z.R.Wang) M.Kato
- Deparia otomasui (Sa. Kurata) Seriz.
- Deparia pachyphylla (Ching) Z.R.He
- Deparia parvisora (C.Chr.) M.Kato
- Deparia petersenii (Kunze) M.Kato
- Deparia polyrhizon (Baker) Seriz.
- Deparia prolifera (Kaulf.) Hook. & Grev.
- Deparia pseudoconilii (Seriz.) Seriz.
- Deparia pterorachis (Christ) M.Kato
- Deparia pycnosora (Christ) M.Kato
- Deparia septentrionalis Rakotondr.
- Deparia setigera (Ching ex Y.T.Hsieh) Z.R.Wang
- Deparia shandongensis (J.X.Li & Z.C.Ding) Z.R.He
- Deparia shennongensis (Ching, Boufford & K.H.Shing) X.C.Zhang
- Deparia sichuanensis (Z.R.Wang) Z.R.Wang
- Deparia stellata Wardani
- Deparia stenoptera (Christ) Z.R.Wang
- Deparia subfluvialis (Hayata) M.Kato
- Deparia subsimilis (Christ) Fraser-Jenk.
- Deparia tenuifolia (Kirk) M.Kato
- Deparia thwaitesii (A.Br. ex Mett.) Christenh.
- Deparia timetensis (E.D.Br.) M.Kato
- Deparia truncata (Ching ex Z.R.Wang) Z.R.Wang
- Deparia unifurcata (Baker) M.Kato
- Deparia vegetior (Kitag.) X.C.Zhang
- Deparia vermiformis (Ching, Boufford & K.H.Shing) Z.R.Wang<
- Deparia viridifrons (Makino) M.Kato
- Deparia wangzhongrenii L.Y.Kuo, M.Kato & W.L.Chiou
- Deparia wilsonii (Christ) X.C.Zhang
- Deparia yunnanensis (Ching) R.Sano
- Deparia zeylanica (Hook.) M.Kato

Some hybrids are also known:

- Deparia × birii Fraser-Jenk.
- Deparia × kanghsienensis (Ching & Y.P.Hsu) Z.R.He
- Deparia × kiyozumiana (Sa. Kurata) Shimura
- Deparia × lobatocrenata (Tagawa) M.Kato
- Deparia × musashiensis (H.Ohba) Seriz.
- Deparia × nakaikeana Fraser-Jenk.
- Deparia × nanakuraensis K.Hori
- Deparia × nanchuanensis (Ching & Z.Y.Liu) Z.R.He
- Deparia × togakushiensis Otsuka & Fujiw.
- Deparia × tomitaroana (Masam.) R.Sano
