= Sthenopis regius =

Scientific classification
- Domain: Eukaryota
- Kingdom: Animalia
- Phylum: Arthropoda
- Class: Insecta
- Order: Lepidoptera
- Family: Hepialidae
- Genus: Sthenopis
- Species: S. regius

Binomial name
- Sthenopis regius (Staudinger, 1896)

Synonyms
- Hepialus regius Staudinger, 1896; Phassus rubellus Bang-Haas, 1939; Sthenopis regeus; Sthenopis regues

Species of moth

Sthenopis regius is a species of moth of the family Hepialidae. It was described by Staudinger in 1896, and is known from China.
