= Sthenopis roseus =

Scientific classification
- Domain: Eukaryota
- Kingdom: Animalia
- Phylum: Arthropoda
- Class: Insecta
- Order: Lepidoptera
- Family: Hepialidae
- Genus: Sthenopis
- Species: S. roseus

Binomial name
- Sthenopis roseus (Oberthür, 1912)

Synonyms
- Hepialus roseus Oberthür, 1911; Phassus miniatus Chu and Wang, 1985

Species of moth

Sthenopis roseus is a species of moth of the family Hepialidae. It was described by Oberthür in 1912, and is known from China, including Hubei.
