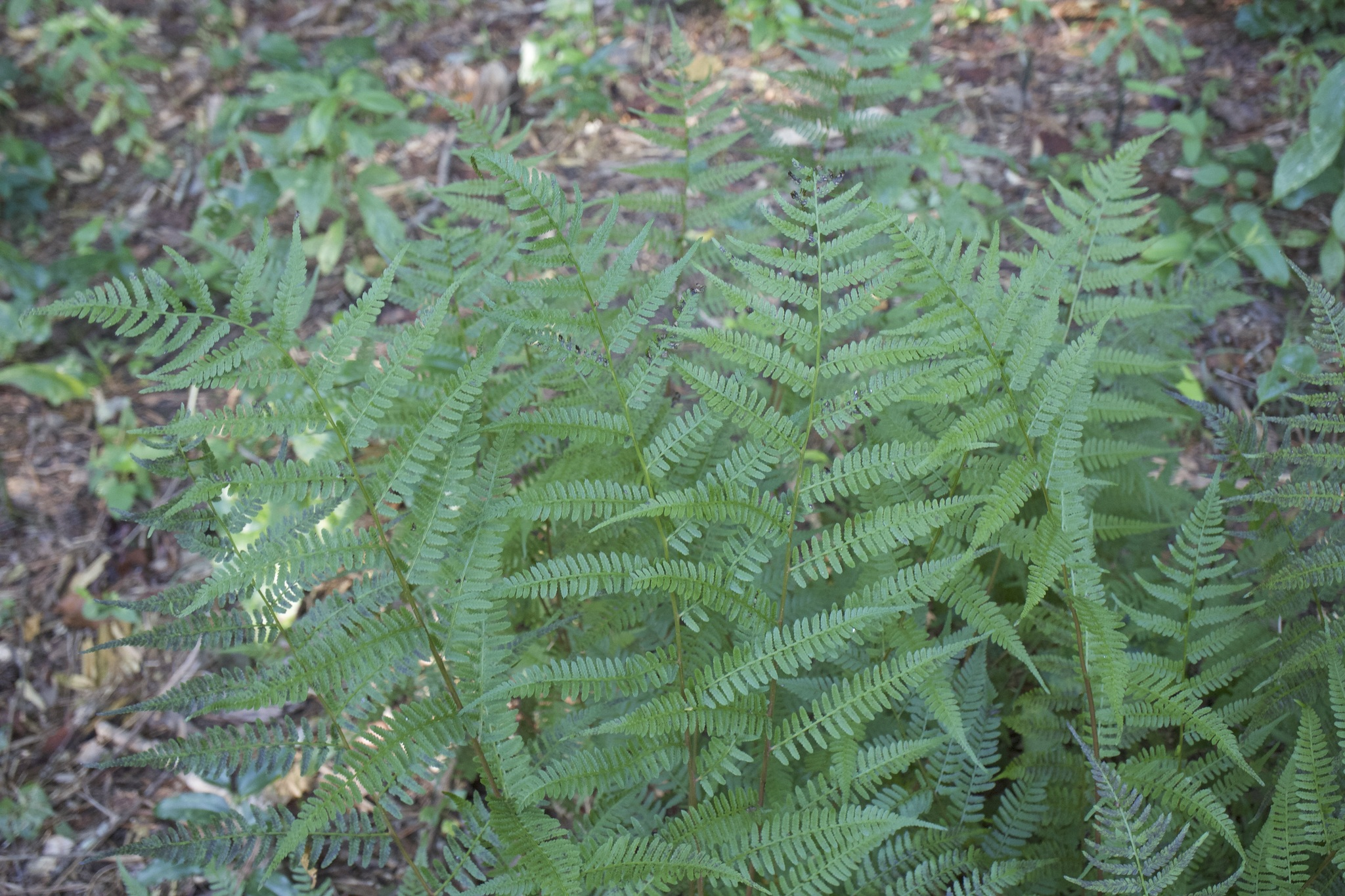

Conservation status
- Secure (NatureServe)

Scientific classification
- Kingdom: Plantae
- Clade: Tracheophytes
- Division: Polypodiophyta
- Class: Polypodiopsida
- Order: Polypodiales
- Suborder: Aspleniineae
- Family: Athyriaceae
- Genus: Athyrium
- Species: A. asplenioides

Binomial name
- Athyrium asplenioides (Michx.) Eaton

= Athyrium asplenioides =

Species of fern

Athyrium asplenioides, or southern lady fern, is a species of the family Athyriaceae. It is a deciduous fern and reaches a height between 1 and 3 feet

Its specific epithet asplenioides means "Asplenium-like". Many botanists instead considered it a variety of the common lady-fern, making it Athyrium filix-femina (L.) Roth, var. asplenioides (Michx.) Farwell.

A. asplenioides is most commonly found in lowland forests, on and near ravine slopes, and within frequently burned pinelands. It prefers environments with lower light levels, ranging from shady to deep-shady, as well as environments with moist loamy sand.

It can often be found growing alongside species such as magnolias, oaks, anise, and others.
