= Sthenopis bouvieri =

Scientific classification
- Domain: Eukaryota
- Kingdom: Animalia
- Phylum: Arthropoda
- Class: Insecta
- Order: Lepidoptera
- Family: Hepialidae
- Genus: Sthenopis
- Species: S. bouvieri

Binomial name
- Sthenopis bouvieri (Oberthür, 1913)

Synonyms
- Hepialus bouvieri Oberthür, 1913

Species of moth

Sthenopis bouvieri is a species of moth of the family Hepialidae. It was described by Oberthür in 1913, and is known from China.
