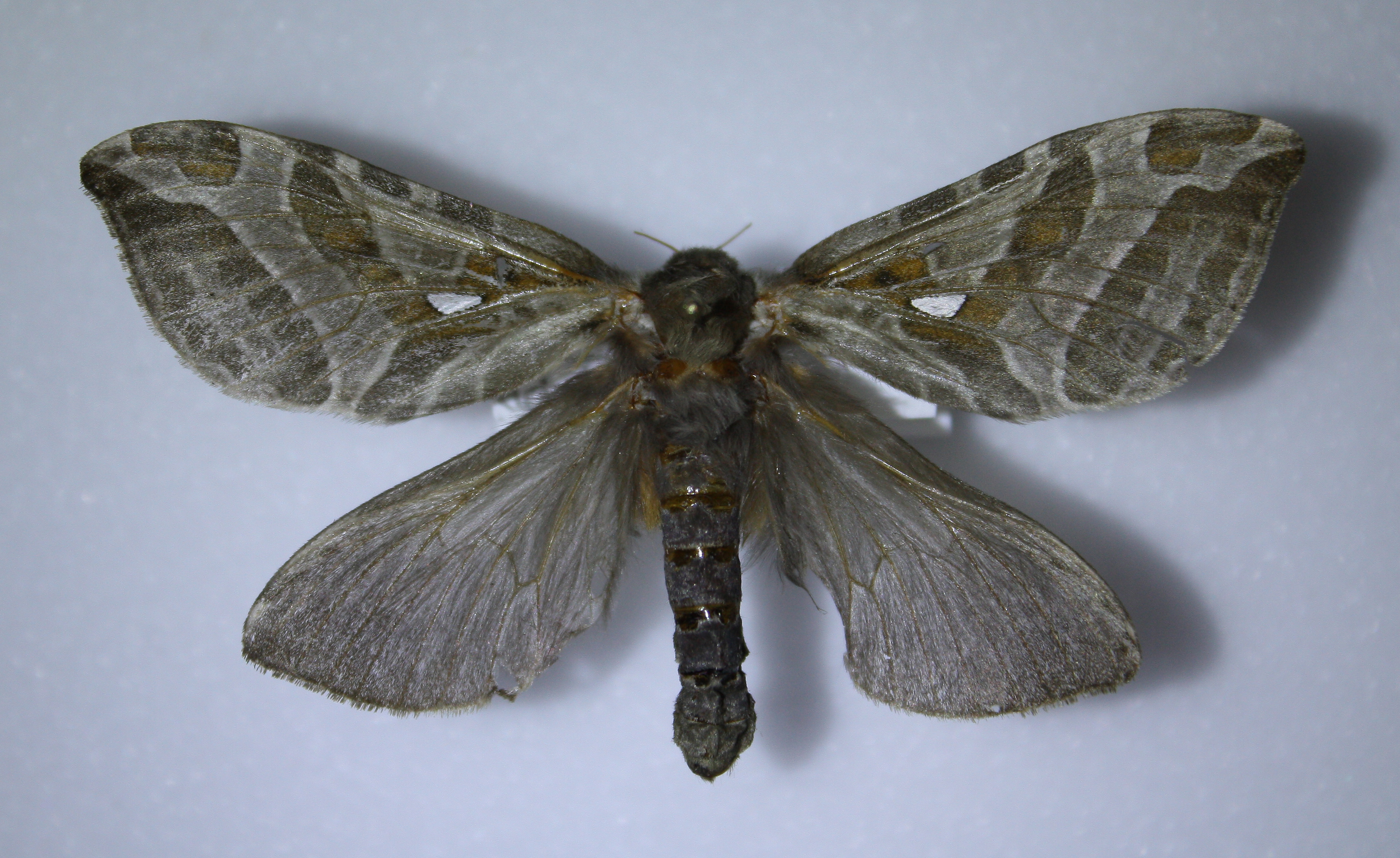

Scientific classification
- Kingdom: Animalia
- Phylum: Arthropoda
- Clade: Pancrustacea
- Class: Insecta
- Order: Lepidoptera
- Family: Hepialidae
- Genus: Sthenopis
- Species: S. argenteomaculatus

Binomial name
- Sthenopis argenteomaculatus (Harris, 1841)

Synonyms
- Hepialus argenteomaculatus Harris, 1841; Sthenopis argentata Packard, [1865]; Cossus alni Kellicott, 1885; Hepialus los Strecker, 1893; Sthenopis perdita Dyar, 1893

= Sthenopis argenteomaculatus =

Silver-spotted ghost moth

Species of moth

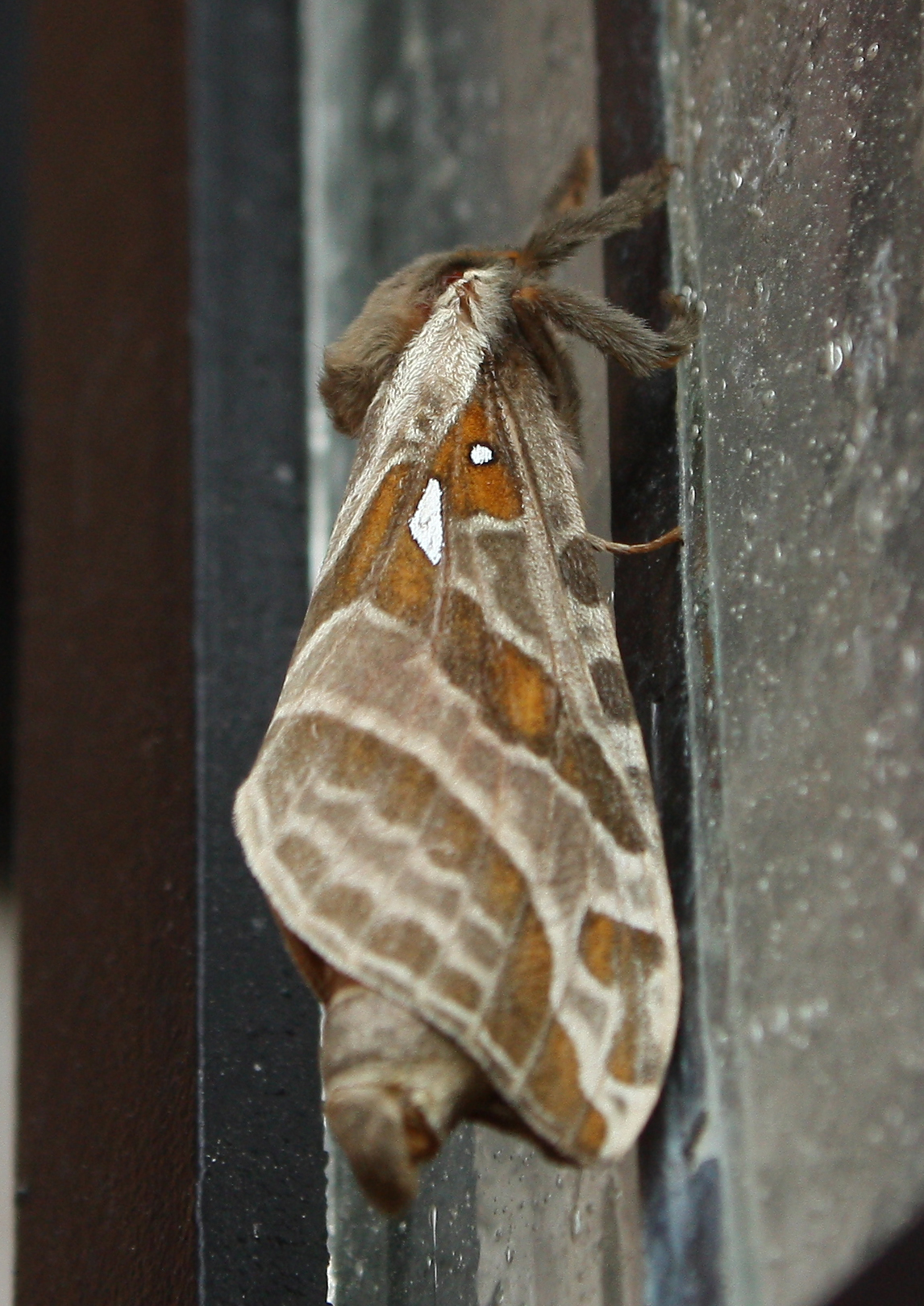
Wings closed

Sthenopis argenteomaculatus, the silver-spotted ghost moth, is a species of moth of the family Hepialidae. It was described by Thaddeus William Harris in 1841, and is known in North America from Nova Scotia to North Carolina and west to Minnesota.

The wingspan is about 65–100 mm (2.6–3.9 in). The forewings are gray to tan, crossed by irregular dark bands. Adults are on wing from June to August.

The wing venation was described as primitive by John Henry Comstock in that the costa of both fore and hind wing retain the primitive 4 branches while in most other Lepidoptera the hind wing costa are fused into one vein. Comstock often used this silver-spotted ghost moth in his publications on Lepidopteran wings and their venation with at least one case of it being reproduced on his title page (e.g. Frontice). The figures of the Hepialid moths and their wing venation illustrating the Comstock publications on wings were from his sometimes co-author Anna Botsford Comstock.

Food plants for this species include Alnus, Betula, and Salix. They bore in roots of their host plant that are partially submerged in water. The life cycle takes two years.
