= Silver Ghost, Alvaston =

Public house in Field Drive, Alvaston, Derby, England

Coordinates: 52.88569°N 1.43078°W

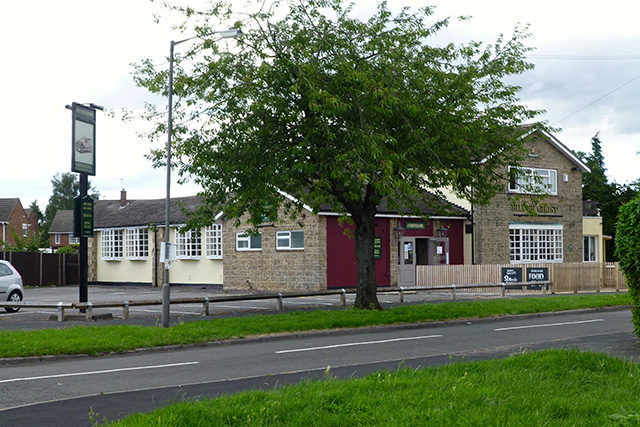
The Silver Ghost

The Silver Ghost is a pub in Field Drive, Alvaston, Derby, England, that has been declared an asset of community value in order to prevent it from closure. The pub is modern and named after the Rolls-Royce Silver Ghost car that was made in Derby. In May 2017, Dawn Hall, the landlady of the pub since 2016, declared the pub a place of refuge and support centre for women who are victims of domestic abuse and children being bullied after she had to intervene in several domestic abuse incidents at the pub. It had previously been named part of a Safe Haven scheme in 2010.
