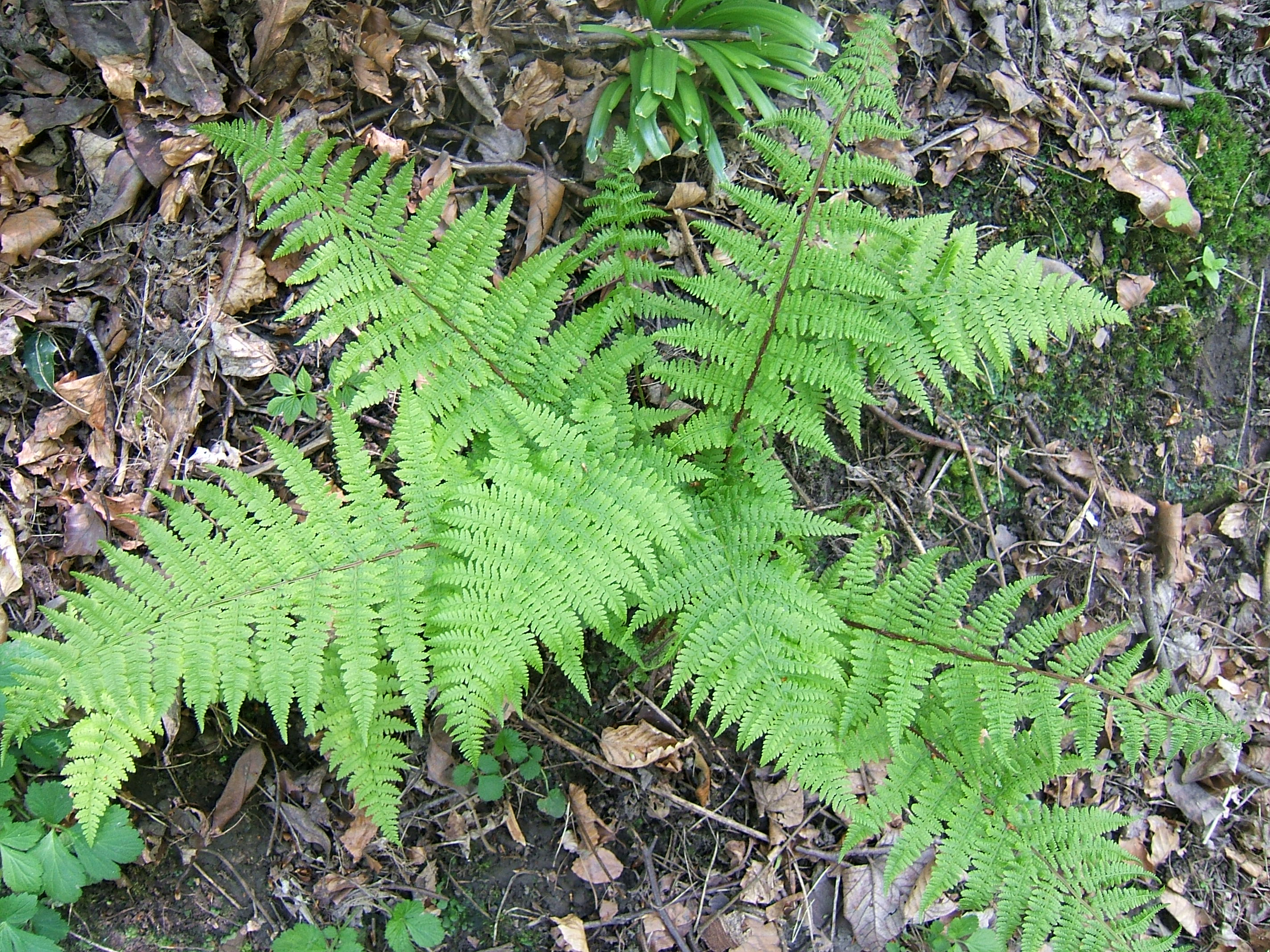

Conservation status
- Secure (NatureServe)

Scientific classification
- Kingdom: Plantae
- Clade: Tracheophytes
- Division: Polypodiophyta
- Class: Polypodiopsida
- Order: Polypodiales
- Suborder: Aspleniineae
- Family: Athyriaceae
- Genus: Athyrium
- Species: A. filix-femina

Binomial name
- Athyrium filix-femina (L.) Roth

= Athyrium filix-femina =

Species of fern

Athyrium filix-femina, the lady fern or common lady-fern, is a large, feathery species of fern native to temperate Asia, Europe, North America, and North Africa. It is often abundant (one of the more common ferns) in damp, shady woodland environments and is often grown for decoration.

Its common names "lady fern" and "female fern" refer to how its reproductive structures (sori) are concealed in an inconspicuous – deemed "female" – manner on the frond. Alternatively, it is said to be feminine because of its elegant and graceful appearance.

== Description ==
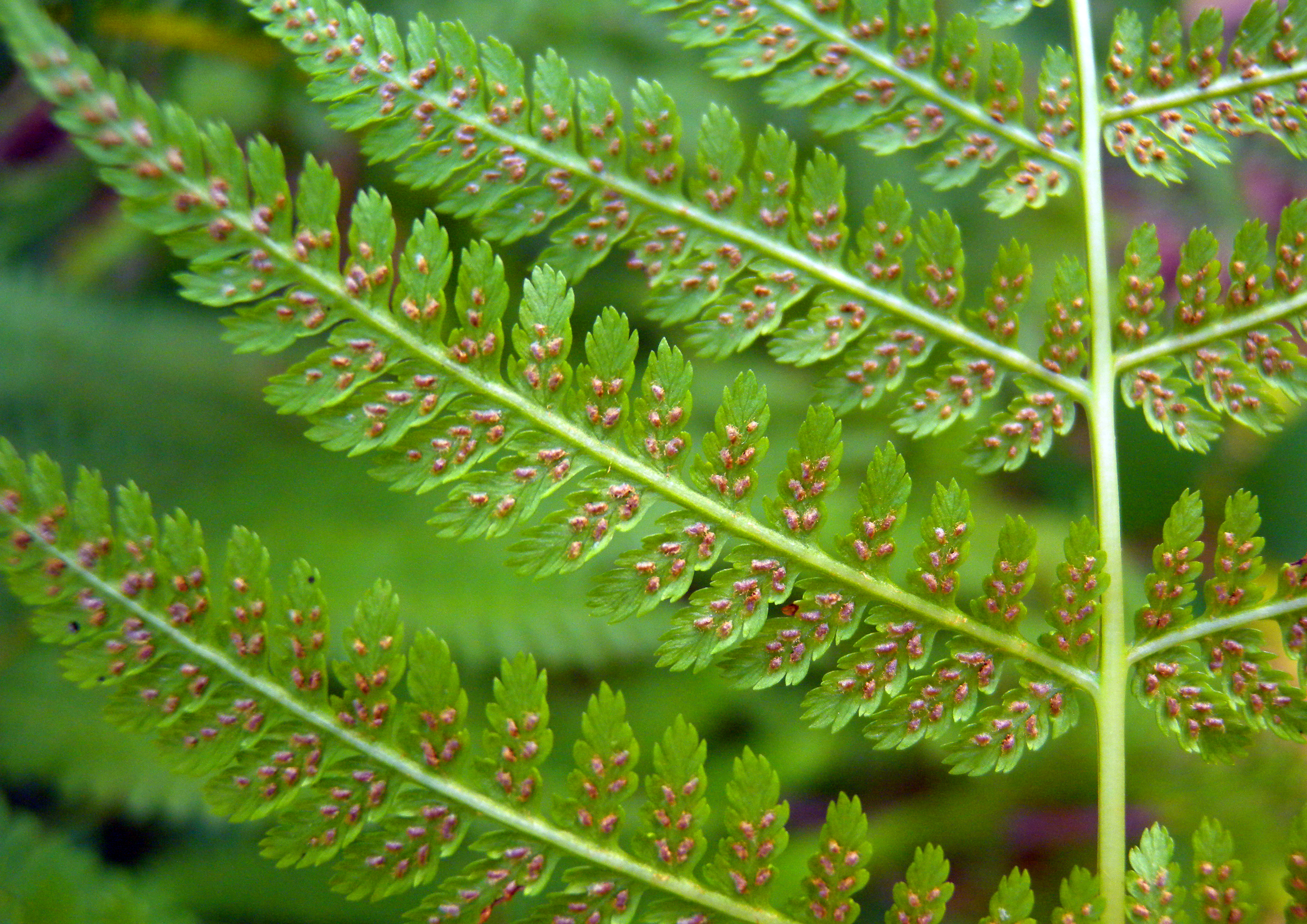
Leaflets and sori

Athyrium filix-femina is now commonly split into three species, typical A. filix-femina, A. angustum (narrow lady fern) and A. asplenioides (southern lady fern).

A. filix-femina is cespitose (the fronds arising from a central point as a clump rather than along a rhizome). The deciduous fronds are light yellow-green, 20–90 centimetres (7.9–35.4 in) long and 5–25 cm (2.0–9.8 in) broad. Overall frond shape tends to be elliptical, with the bottom pinnae shorter in length than those in the middle.

Sori appear as narrow ovate dots on the underside of the frond, 1–6 per pinnule. They are covered by a prominently whitish to brown reniform (kidney-shaped) indusium. Fronds are very dissected, being 3-pinnate. The stipe may bear long, pale brown, papery scales at the base. The spores are yellow on A. angustum and dark brown on A. asplenioides.

== Names ==
The Finnish name for this plant is hiirenporras, literally meaning 'mouse's stair'.

== Habitat ==
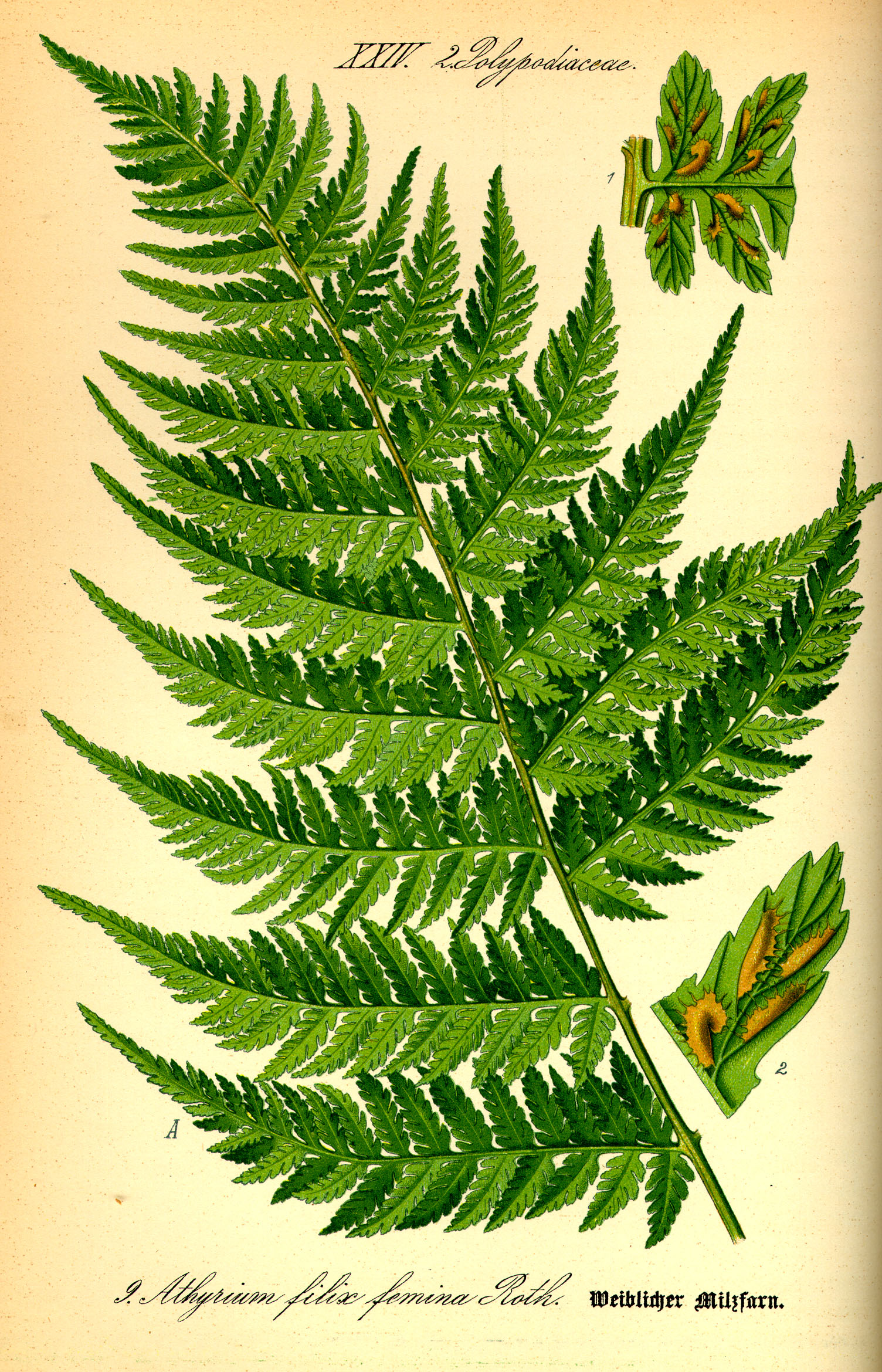
19th century illustration

Athyrium filix-femina is very hardy, tolerating temperatures well below −20 °C (−4 °F) throughout its range.

In Finland as a native plant, A. filix-femina is at its most abundant in inland lake areas but grows commonly in almost the whole country, excluding Lapland where it is rare. The plant prefers especially mesotrophic eutrophic paludified hardwood-spruce forest (lehtokorpi in Finnish). It is also abundant in coastal groves, sides of creeks and areas with springs. Even though the plant gets easily frostbitten and therefore does not like open areas, it can still be found often also in ditches near roads and fields.

== Cultivation and uses ==
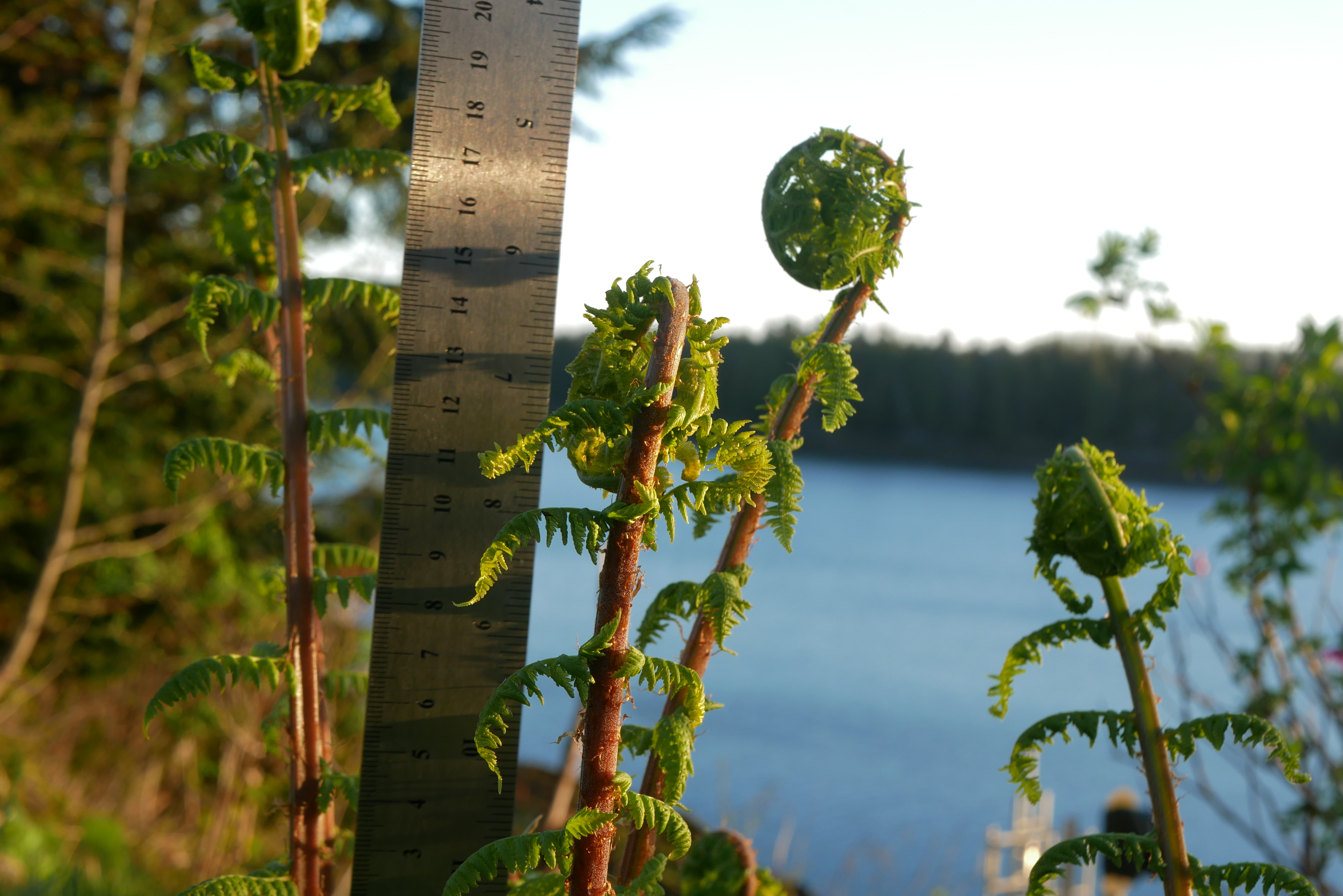
Young Lady Fern Fiddleheads

Numerous cultivars have been developed for garden use, of which the following have gained the Royal Horticultural Society's Award of Garden Merit:

- A. filix-femina 'Vernoniae'
- A. filix-femina 'Frizelliae'

The young fronds are edible after cooking; Native Americans cook both the fiddleheads and the rhizomes.
