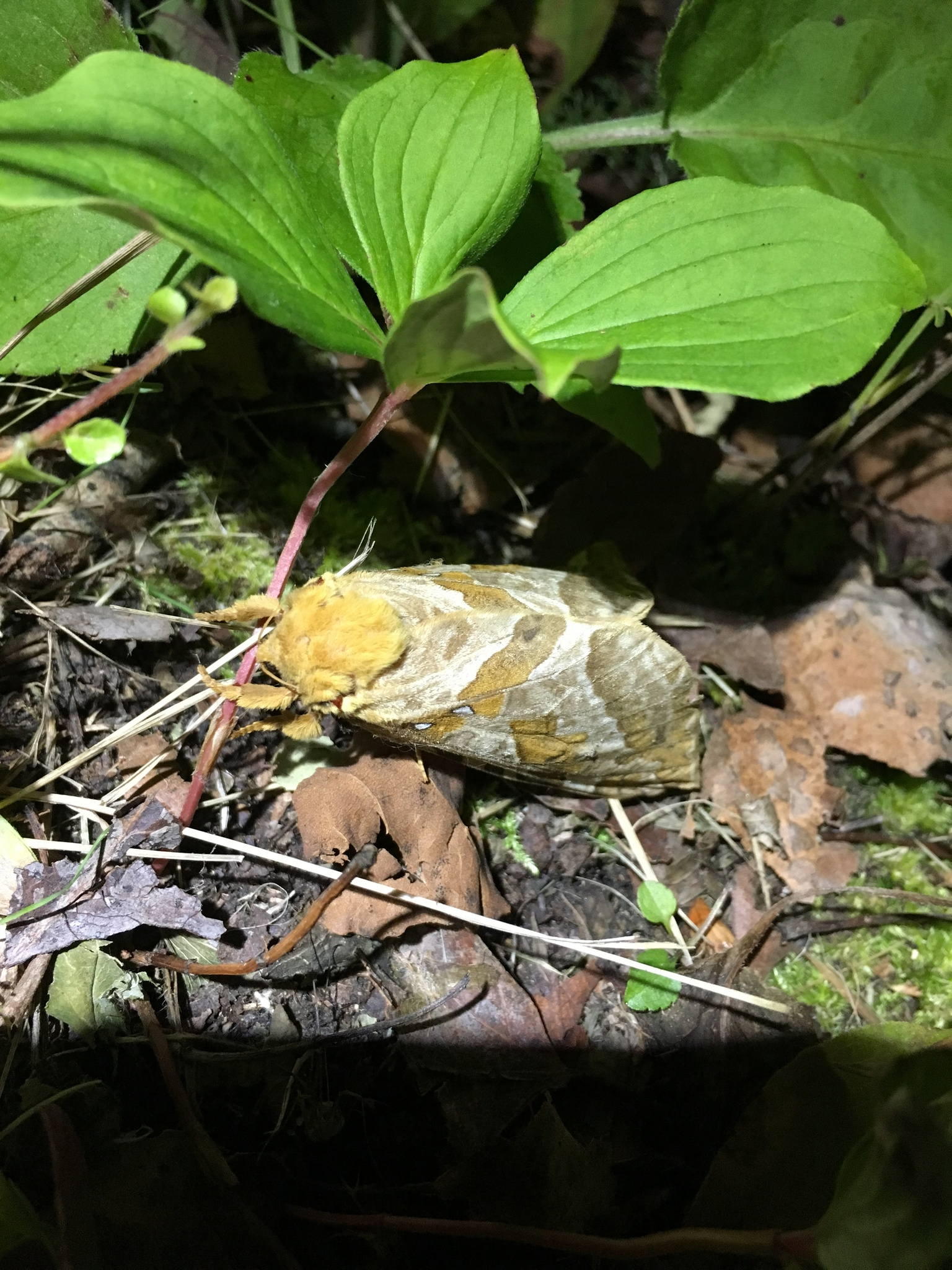

Scientific classification
- Kingdom: Animalia
- Phylum: Arthropoda
- Clade: Pancrustacea
- Class: Insecta
- Order: Lepidoptera
- Family: Hepialidae
- Genus: Sthenopis
- Species: S. purpurascens

Binomial name
- Sthenopis purpurascens (Packard, 1863)

Synonyms
- Gorgopis purpurascens Packard, 1863; Gorgopis quadriguttatus Grote, 1864; Sthenopis semiauratus Neumoegen and Dyar, 1893

= Sthenopis purpurascens =

Species of moth

Sthenopis purpurascens, the four-spotted ghost moth, is a species of moth of the family Hepialidae. It was described by Packard in 1863. It is found in Canada and the United States, from Labrador and New York north and west to British Columbia and the Northwest Territories, south in the mountains to Arizona.

The wingspan is 66–100 mm. There are two color forms, a purple-grey and a yellow-brown form. The hindwings are purple brown or salmon pink and generally unmarked.
