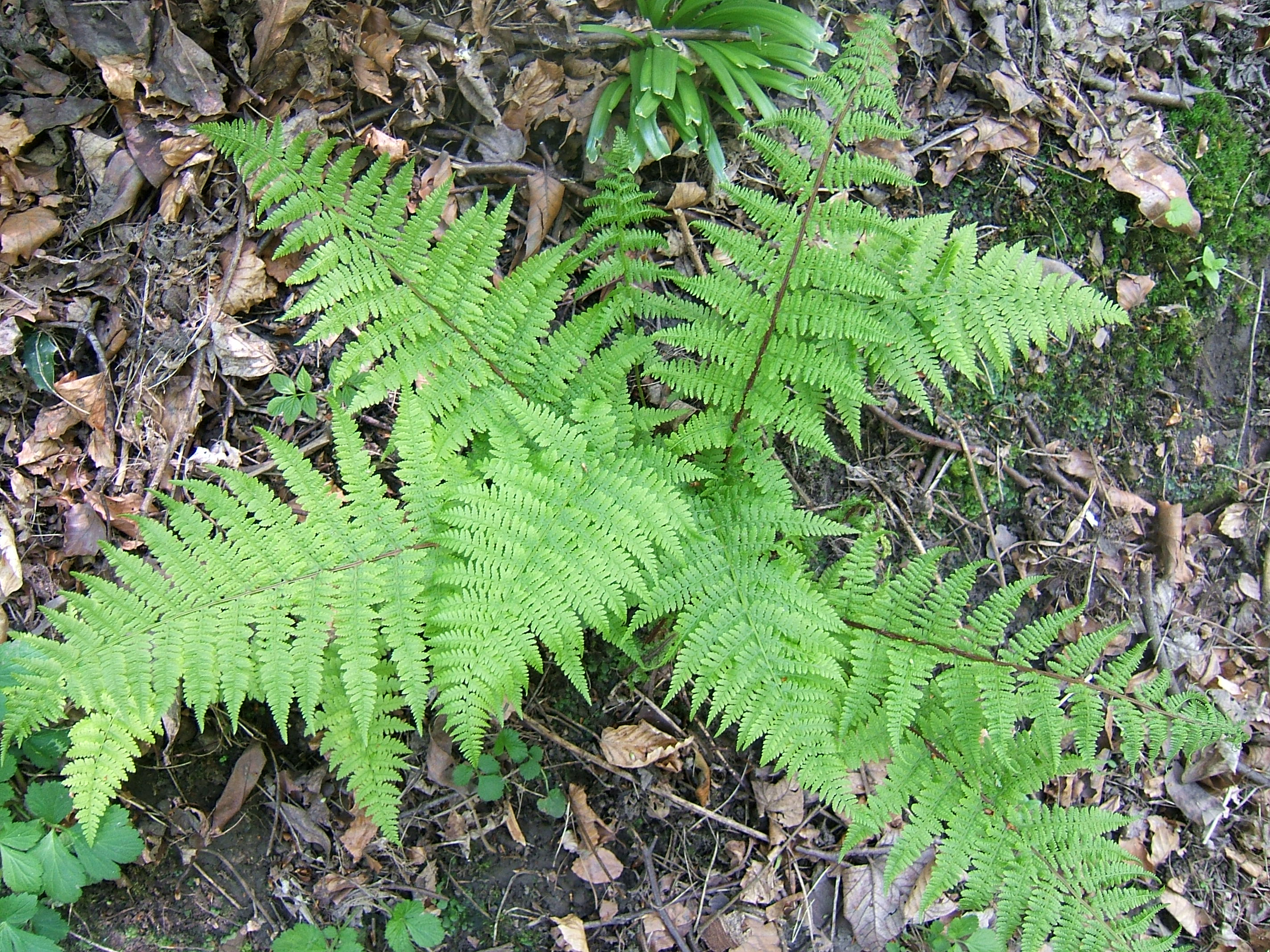
- Athyrium filix-femina

Scientific classification
- Kingdom: Plantae
- Clade: Tracheophytes
- Division: Polypodiophyta
- Class: Polypodiopsida
- Order: Polypodiales
- Suborder: Aspleniineae
- Family: Athyriaceae
- Genus: Athyrium; Roth

= Athyrium =

Genus of ferns

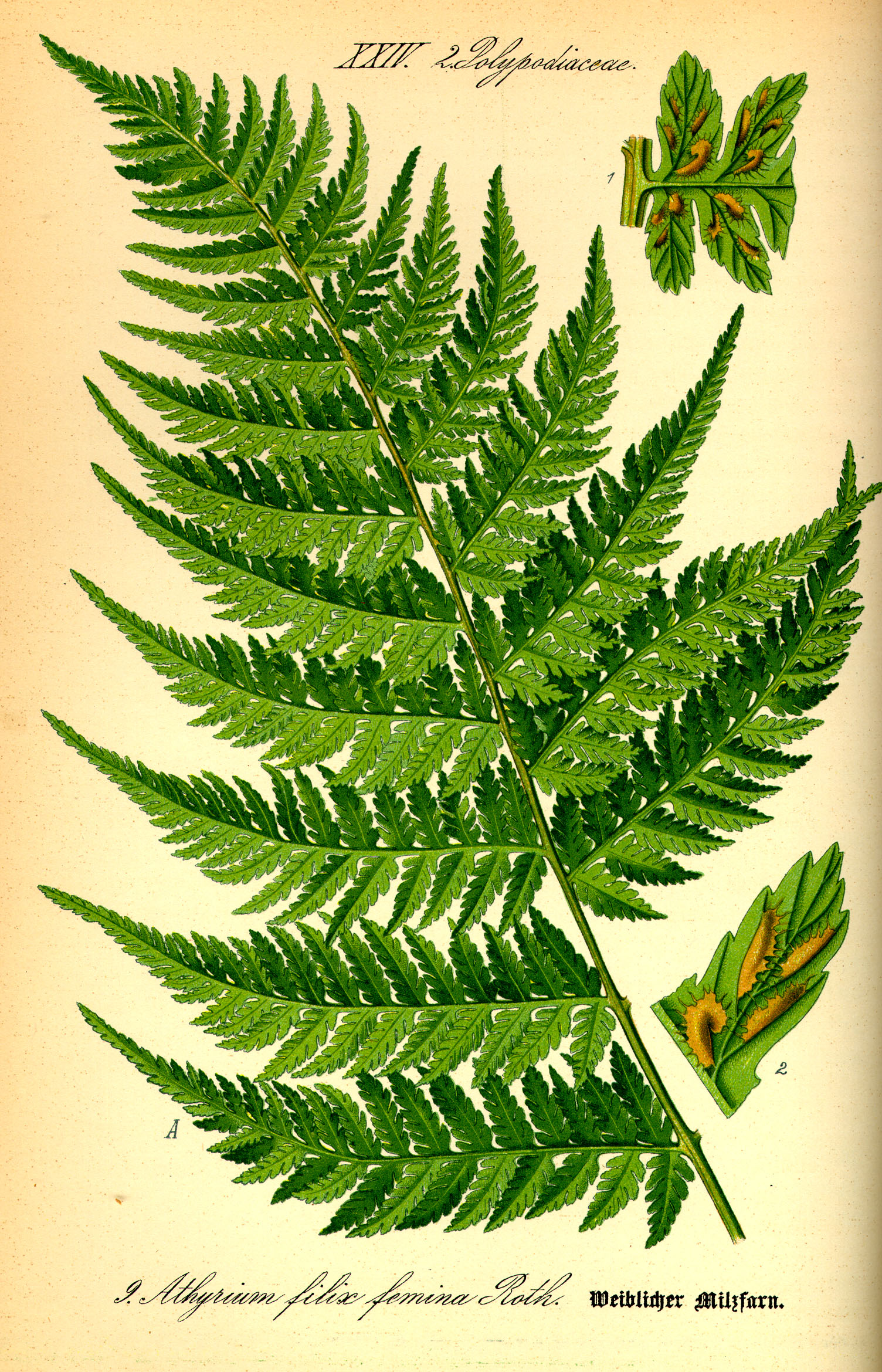
19th-century illustration of A. filix-femina

Athyrium (lady-fern) is a genus of about 180 species of terrestrial ferns, with a cosmopolitan distribution. It is placed in the family Athyriaceae, in the order Polypodiales. Its genus name is from Greek a- ('without') and Latinized Greek thyreos ('shield'), describing its inconspicuous indusium (sorus' covering). The common name "lady fern" refers in particular to the common lady fern, Athyrium filix-femina.

Athyrium species are used as food plants by the larvae of some Lepidoptera species including the small angle shades and Sthenopis auratus.

== Species ==
There are about 180, including:

- Athyrium adpressum
- Athyrium alpestre
- Athyrium angustum
- Athyrium anisopterum
- Athyrium araiostegioides
- Athyrium arisanense
- Athyrium asplenioides
- Athyrium atkinsonii
- Athyrium attenuatum
- Athyrium auriculatum
- Athyrium austro-orientale
- Athyrium austro-yunnanense
- Athyrium biseralatum
- Athyrium bomicola
- Athyrium brevifrons
- Athyrium brevisorum
- Athyrium bucahwangense
- Athyrium caudipinna
- Athyrium chingianum
- Athyrium christensenii
- Athyrium clarkei
- Athyrium clivicola
- Athyrium criticum
- Athyrium cryptogrammoides
- Athyrium delavayi
- Athyrium delicatulum
- Athyrium densisorum
- Athyrium dentilobum
- Athyrium devolii
- Athyrium dissitifolium
- Athyrium distentifolium
- Athyrium drepanopterum
- Athyrium dubium
- Athyrium duthiei
- Athyrium epirachis
- Athyrium erithrocaulon
- Athyrium erythropodum
- Athyrium fallaciosum
- Athyrium fangii
- Athyrium filix-femina
- Athyrium fimbriatum
- Athyrium fissum
- Athyrium flabellulatum
- Athyrium flavicoma
- Athyrium flexile
- Athyrium fragile
- Athyrium fujianense
- Athyrium giganteum
- Athyrium goeringianum
- Athyrium guangnanense
- Athyrium haleakalae
- Athyrium himalaicum
- Athyrium hirtirachis
- Athyrium huhsienense
- Athyrium imbricatum
- Athyrium iseanum
- Athyrium kanghsienense
- Athyrium kenzo-satakei
- Athyrium kuratae
- Athyrium leiopodum
- Athyrium liangwangshanicum
- Athyrium mackinnonii
- Athyrium macrocarpum
- Athyrium medium
- Athyrium medogense
- Athyrium melanolepis
- Athyrium mengtzeense
- Athyrium multidentatum
- Athyrium nakanoi
- Athyrium nephrodioides
- Athyrium nigripes
- Athyrium niponicum
- Athyrium nyalamense
- Athyrium oppositipinnum
- Athyrium otophorum
- Athyrium pachyphlebium
- Athyrium pachyphyllum
- Athyrium pachysorum
- Athyrium parapellucidum
- Athyrium pectinatum
- Athyrium pellucidum
- Athyrium pseudo-filix-femina
- Athyrium pubicostatum
- Athyrium rachidosorum
- Athyrium reflexipinnum
- Athyrium roseum
- Athyrium rotundilobum
- Athyrium rubripes
- Athyrium rupicola
- Athyrium sessile
- Athyrium sikkimense
- Athyrium silvicolum
- Athyrium sinense
- Athyrium stenopodum
- Athyrium strigillosum
- Athyrium submacrocarpum
- Athyrium subrigescens
- Athyrium supraspinescens
- Athyrium tenuicaule
- Athyrium tenuifolium
- Athyrium tibeticum
- Athyrium tozanense
- Athyrium vidalii
- Athyrium tripinnatum
- Athyrium viviparum
- Athyrium wallichianum
- Athyrium wardii
- Athyrium wuliangshanense
- Athyrium yokoscense
- Athyrium yui
- Athyrium yunnanense
