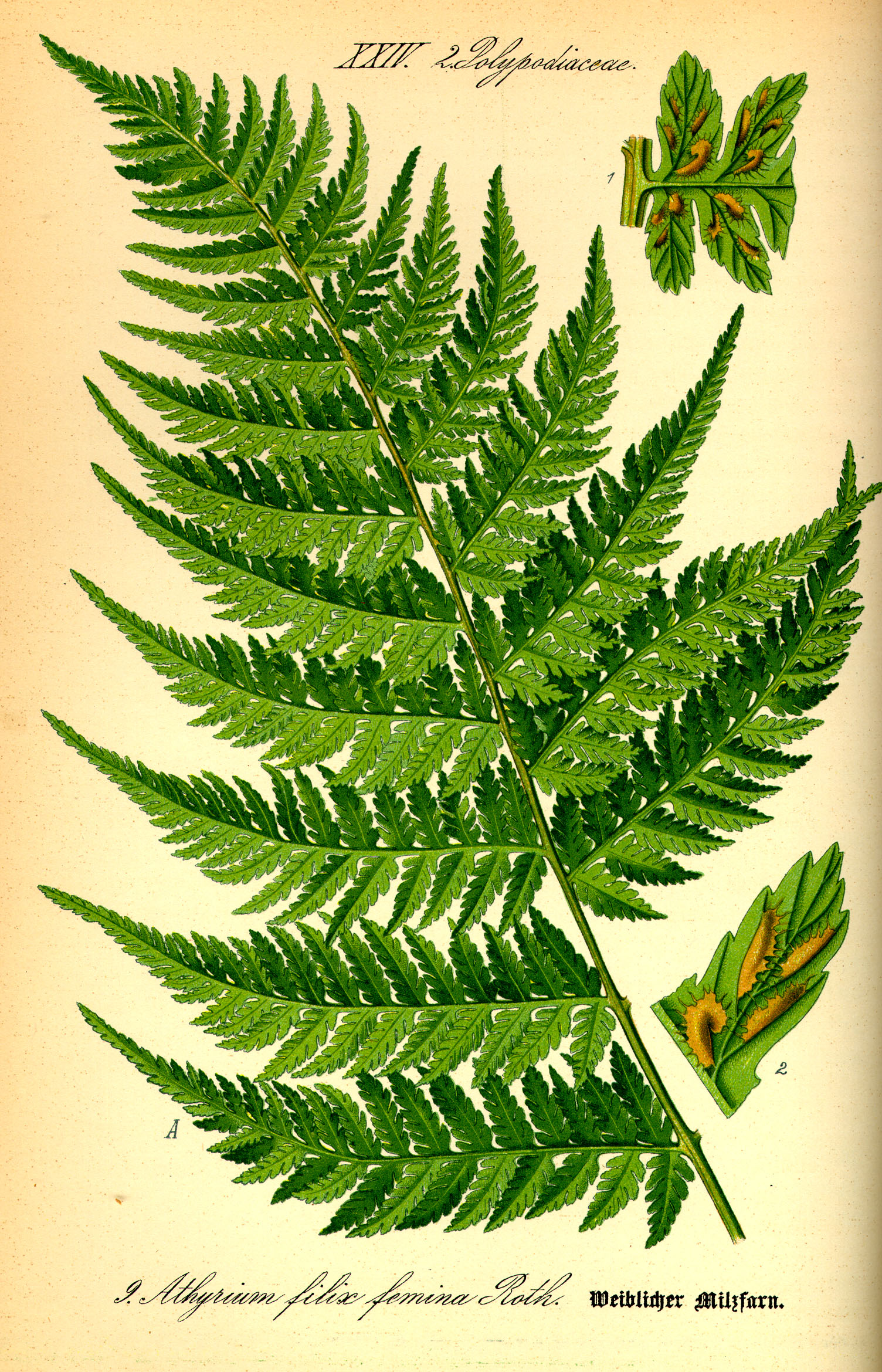
- Athyrium filix-femina

Scientific classification
- Kingdom: Plantae
- Clade: Tracheophytes
- Division: Polypodiophyta
- Class: Polypodiopsida
- Order: Polypodiales
- Suborder: Aspleniineae
- Family: Athyriaceae; Alston

Type genus
- Athyrium

Genera
- See text.

= Athyriaceae =

Family of ferns

The Athyriaceae (ladyferns and allies) are a family of terrestrial ferns in the order Polypodiales. In the Pteridophyte Phylogeny Group classification of 2016 (PPG I), the family is placed in the suborder Aspleniineae, and includes two genera. Alternatively, it may be treated as the subfamily Athyrioideae of a very broadly defined family Aspleniaceae. The family has a cosmopolitan distribution.

== Description ==
Species of the Athyriaceae are terrestrial or lithophytic, less commonly aquatic. They grow from various kinds of rhizome: short or long, creeping or erect, branched or not. The distribution and evolution of characters in the family is complex, and the genera have few constant features by which they can be identified. The sporangia have stalks two or three cells wide in the middle, and contain brown monolete spores.

== Taxonomy ==
=== Earlier classifications ===
The family was first created by Arthur H.G. Alston in 1956. It has had a varied history. In 2014, Christenhusz and Chase submerged it as the subfamily Athyrioideae within the family Aspleniaceae, a status maintained by Plants of the World Online as of July 2019. The PPG I classification of 2016 restored it to family status.

Athyriaceae is a member of the eupolypods II clade (now the suborder Aspleniineae), in the order Polypodiales. It is related to other families in the clade as in the following cladogram:

- Aspleniineae (eupolypods II)
  - Cystopteridaceae
  - - - Rhachidosoraceae
      - - Diplaziopsidaceae
        - - Aspleniaceae
          - Hemidictyaceae
    - - Thelypteridaceae
      - - Woodsiaceae
        - - - Onocleaceae
            - Blechnaceae
          - Athyriaceae

The Athyriaceae in the past included Cystopteris and Gymnocarpium (now part of Dennstaedtiaceae). The family has been subsumed in the family Woodsiaceae, but a Woodsiaceae defined in this way may be paraphyletic if it omits the Onocleaceae and Blechnaceae (as of 2006, the evidence was not clear).

=== Genera ===
As circumscribed in PPG I, Athyriacae contains the following genera.

- Athyrium Roth (including Anisocampium and Cornopteris Nakai)
- Deparia Hook. & Grev.
- Diplazium Sw.

As of November 2019, the Checklist of Ferns and Lycophytes of the World recognizes three further genera, which other sources include in Athyrium:

- Anisocampium C.Presl
- Cornopteris Nakai
- Pseudathyrium Newman

The genera have the following phylogenetic relationships:

PPG I
Fern Tree of Life

- - Deparia
  - - Diplazium
    - Athyrium s.l.
      - Anisocampium
      - - Cornopteris
        - Athyrium s.s.

- - Deparioideae
    Deparia
  - Athyrioideae
    - - Ephemeropteris
      - - Anisocampium
        - - - Pseudathyrium
            - Cornopteris
          - Athyrium
    - Diplazium

== Distribution and habitat ==
Athyriaceae has a worldwide distribution, particularly the genus Athyrium. Most species of Athyriaceae are medium-sized terrestrial ferns, growing in the understorey below trees and shrubs.
