= Onocleopsis =

Scientific classification
- Kingdom: Plantae
- Clade: Tracheophytes
- Division: Polypodiophyta
- Class: Polypodiopsida
- Order: Polypodiales
- Suborder: Aspleniineae
- Family: Onocleaceae
- Genus: Onocleopsis; F.Ballard
- Species: O. hintonii

Binomial name
- Onocleopsis hintonii F.Ballard; Amer. Fern J. 35: 1 (1945)

Synonyms
- Matteuccia hintonii (Ballard) Kato; Onoclea hintonii (Ballard) Christenhusz

Genus of ferns

Onocleopsis is a genus of ferns in the family Onocleaceae containing only one extant species, Onocleopsis hintonii.

- - Cystopteridaceae
  - - Aspleniaceae
    - - Thelypteridaceae
      - - Woodsiaceae
        - - - Onocleaceae
              - - - Matteuccia
                  - Onocleopsis
                - Onoclea
              - Pentarhizidium 2 spp.
            - Blechnaceae
          - Athyriaceae
- polypodioid ferns

Probable Onocleaceae phylogeny
(line lengths are not significant)
