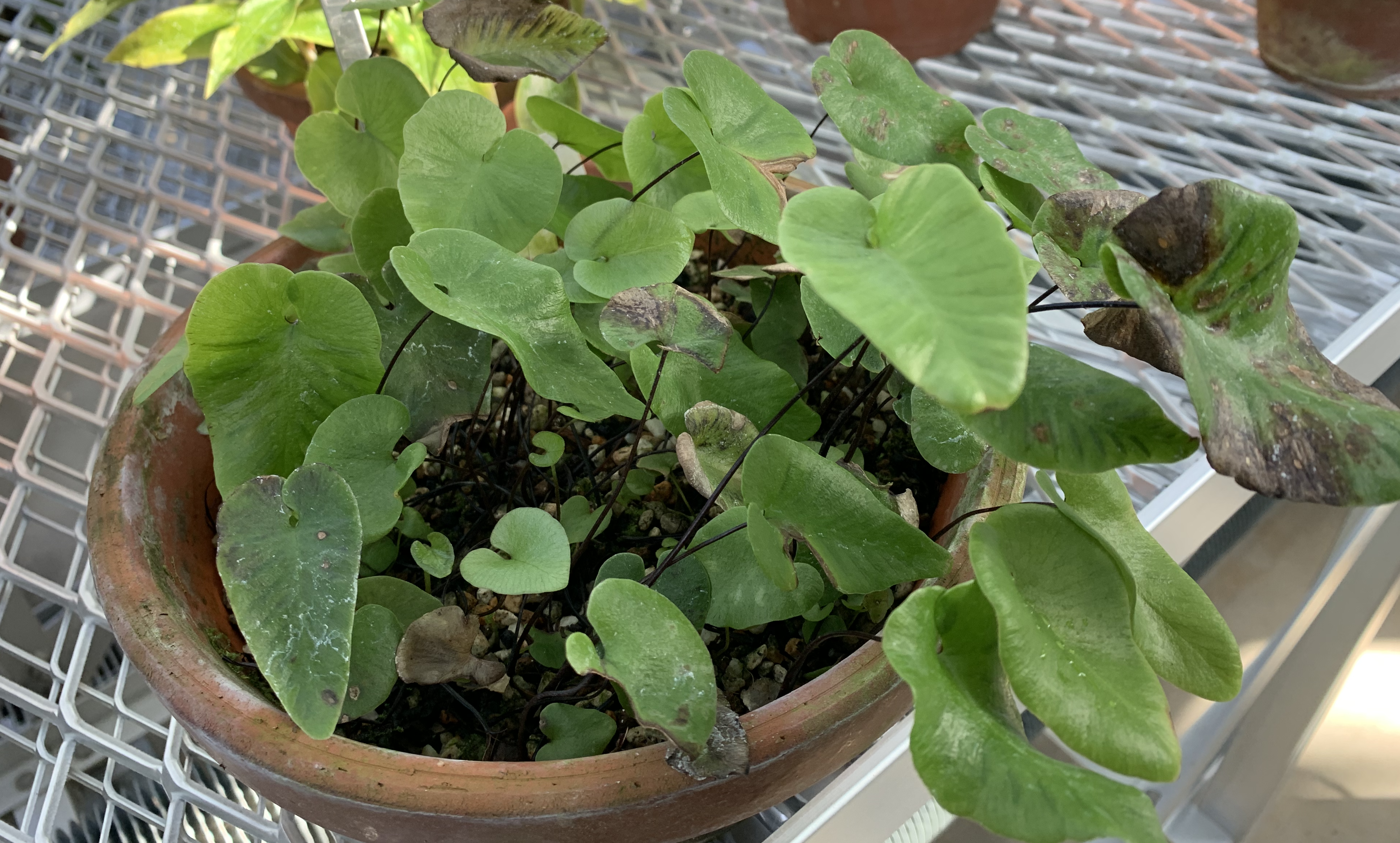
- In Koishikawa Botanical Garden, Tokyo

Conservation status
- Near Threatened (IUCN 3.1)

Scientific classification
- Kingdom: Plantae
- Clade: Tracheophytes
- Division: Polypodiophyta
- Class: Polypodiopsida
- Order: Polypodiales
- Suborder: Aspleniineae
- Family: Aspleniaceae
- Genus: Hymenasplenium
- Species: H. cardiophyllum

Binomial name
- Hymenasplenium cardiophyllum (Hance) Nakaike

Synonyms
- Asplenium cardiophyllum (Hance) Baker; Boniniella cardiophylla (Hance) Tagawa; Micropodium cardiophyllum Hance

= Hymenasplenium cardiophyllum =

Species of fern

Hymenasplenium cardiophyllum is a species of fern in the family Aspleniaceae. It is native to China and Japan. Its natural habitat is subtropical or tropical moist lowland forests. It is threatened by habitat loss.
