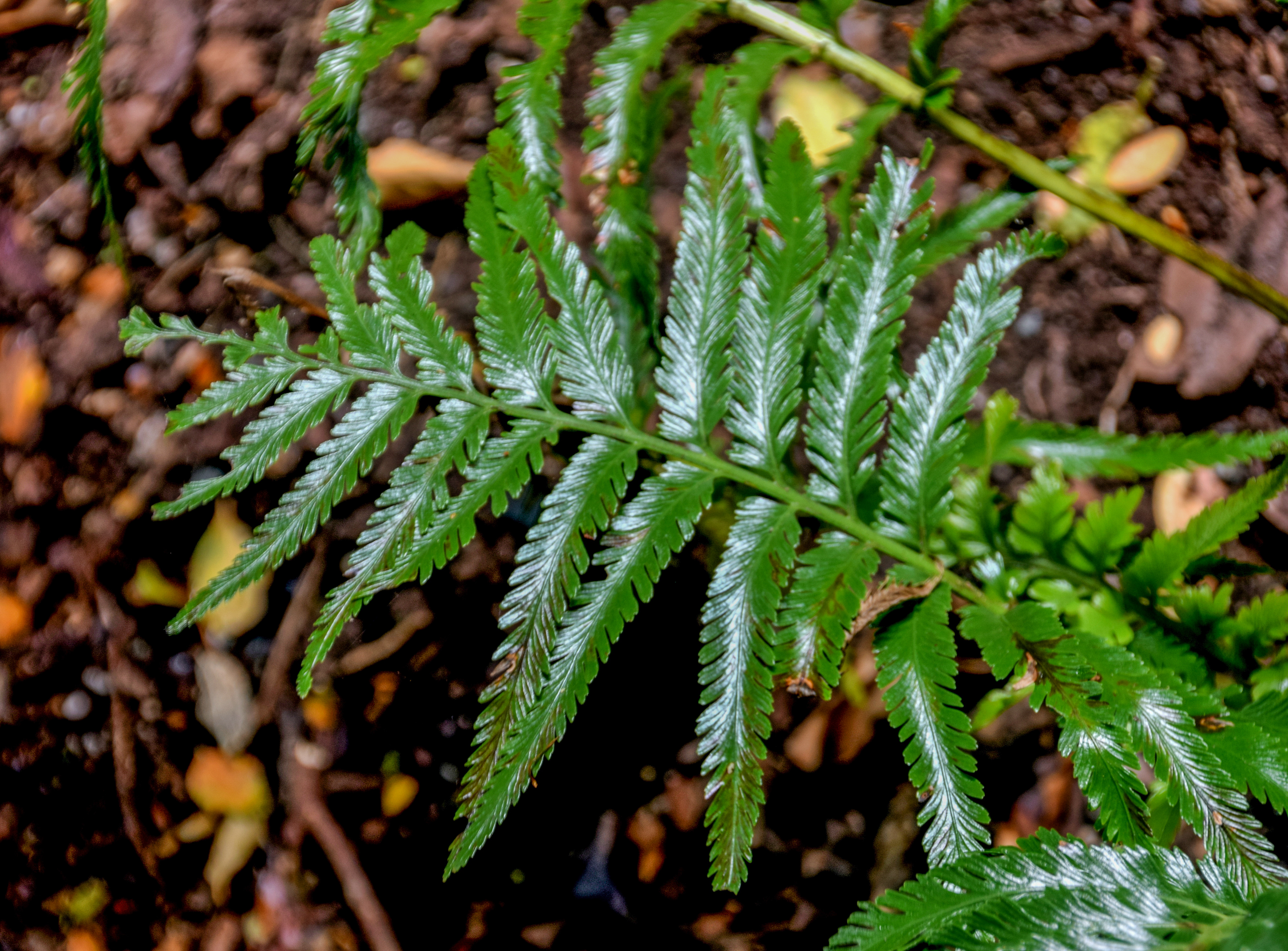
- Asplenium pteridoides in Wellington Botanical Garden

Scientific classification
- Kingdom: Plantae
- Clade: Tracheophytes
- Division: Polypodiophyta
- Class: Polypodiopsida
- Order: Polypodiales
- Suborder: Aspleniineae
- Family: Aspleniaceae
- Genus: Asplenium
- Species: A. pteridoides

Binomial name
- Asplenium pteridoides Baker

Synonyms
- Asplenium howeanum (Watts) W.R.B.Oliv.; Asplenium bulbiferum var. howeanum Watts

= Asplenium pteridoides =

Species of fern in the spleenwort family

Asplenium pteridoides is a species of terrestrial fern in the family Aspleniaceae. It is endemic to Australia's subtropical Lord Howe Island in the Tasman Sea. It is restricted to the cool, moist understorey of the forest on the island's southern mountains.

== Taxonomy ==
A global phylogeny of Asplenium published in 2020 divided the genus into eleven clades, which were given informal names pending further taxonomic study. A. pteridoides belongs to the "Neottopteris clade", members of which generally have somewhat leathery leaf tissue. It forms a clade with A. milnei and A. surrogatum, two other Lord Howe Island endemics, suggesting that all three species diverged after a single colonization of the island by their ancestor. This clade is sister to a large group of Pacific Ocean spleenworts.
