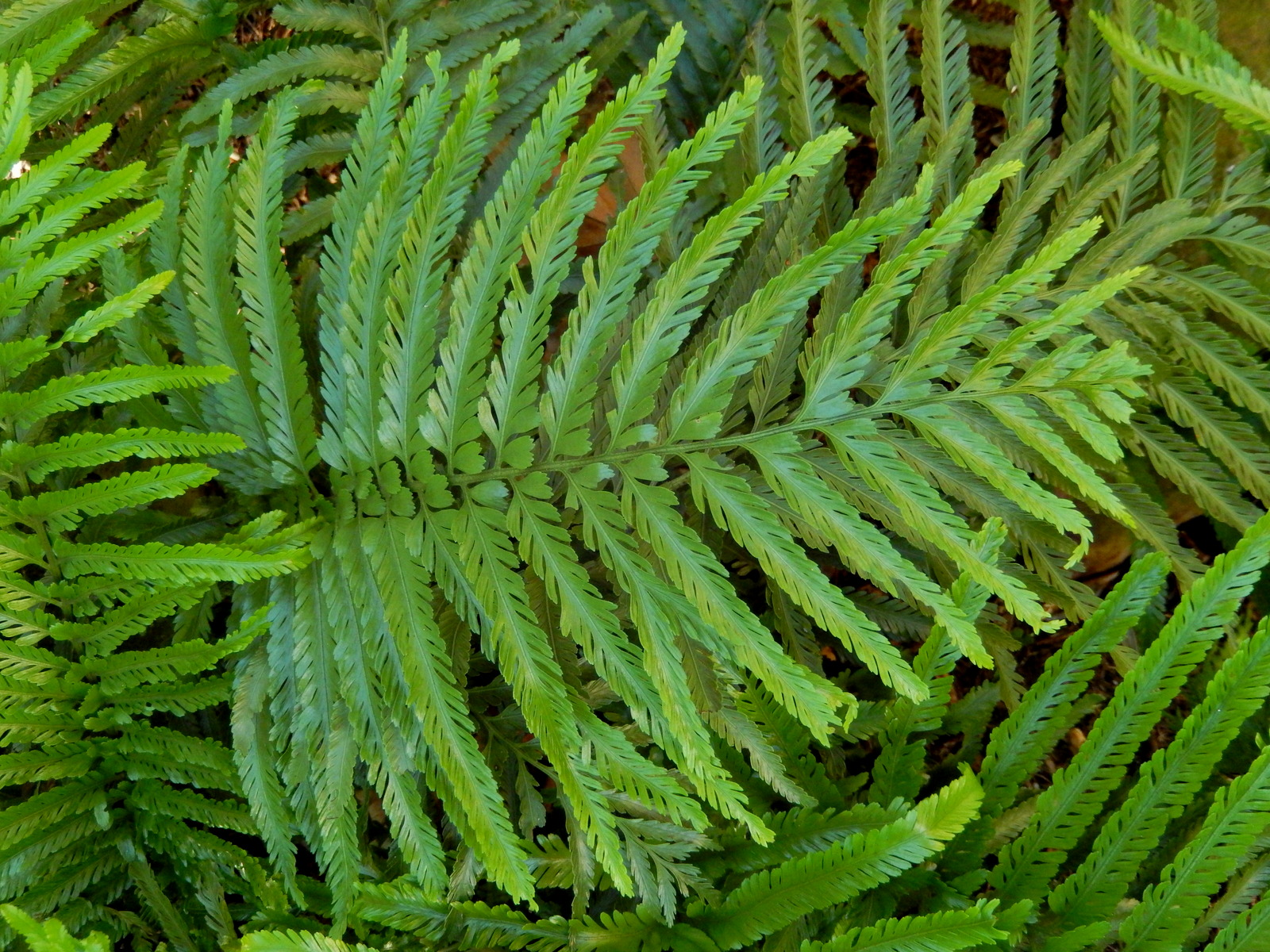

Scientific classification
- Kingdom: Plantae
- Clade: Tracheophytes
- Division: Polypodiophyta
- Class: Polypodiopsida
- Order: Polypodiales
- Suborder: Aspleniineae
- Family: Aspleniaceae
- Genus: Asplenium
- Species: A. surrogatum

Binomial name
- Asplenium surrogatum P.S.Green

Synonyms
- Asplenium lucidum var. incisum (Benth.) Bonap.; Asplenium obtusatum var. incisum Benth.

= Asplenium surrogatum =

Species of fern in the spleenwort family

Asplenium surrogatum is a species of fern in the family Aspleniaceae. It is endemic to Australia's subtropical Lord Howe Island in the Tasman Sea. It grows both terrestrially and as an epiphyte. It occurs in forest at high elevations on the island's mountains.

== Taxonomy ==
A global phylogeny of Asplenium published in 2020 divided the genus into eleven clades, which were given informal names pending further taxonomic study. A. surrogatum belongs to the "Neottopteris clade", members of which generally have somewhat leathery leaf tissue. It forms a clade with A. milnei and A. pteridoides, two other Lord Howe Island endemics, suggesting that all three species diverged after a single colonization of the island by their ancestor. This clade is sister to a large group of Pacific Ocean spleenworts.
