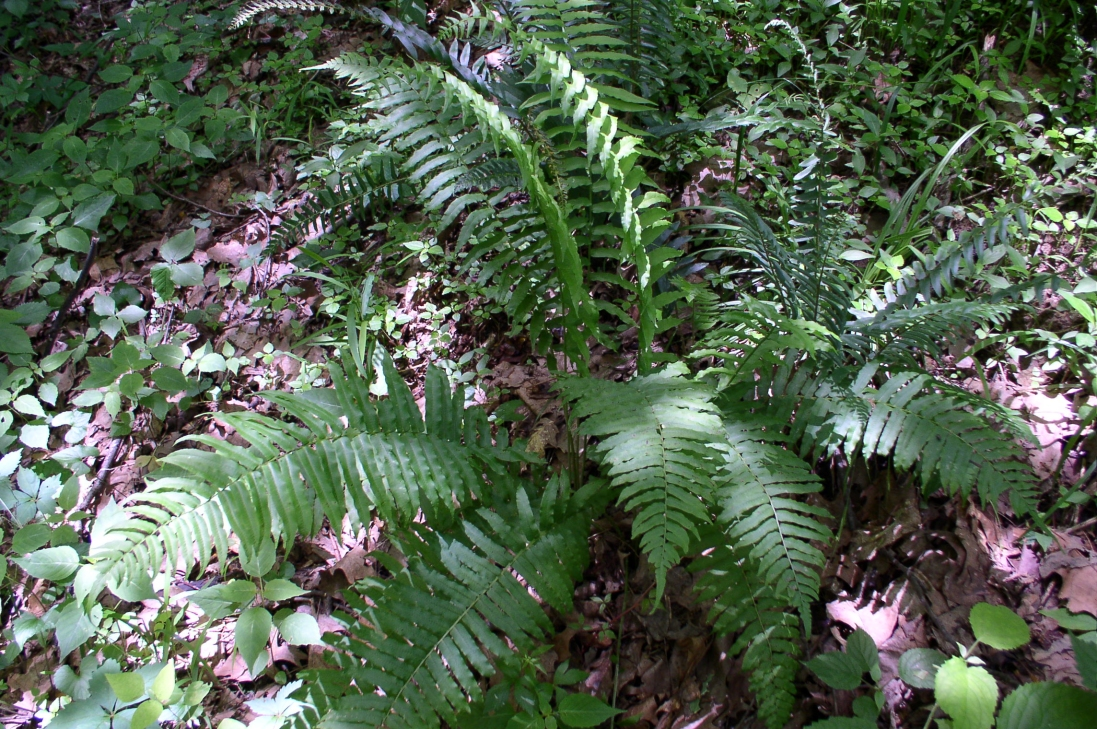
- Homalosorus pycnocarpos in mesophytic forest, Brown County State Park, Indiana, USA.

Conservation status
- Secure (NatureServe)

Scientific classification
- Kingdom: Plantae
- Clade: Tracheophytes
- Division: Polypodiophyta
- Class: Polypodiopsida
- Order: Polypodiales
- Suborder: Aspleniineae
- Family: Diplaziopsidaceae
- Genus: Homalosorus; Small ex Pic.Serm.
- Species: H. pycnocarpos

Binomial name
- Homalosorus pycnocarpos (Spreng.) Pic.Serm.

Synonyms
- Asplenium angustifolium Michx. nom. ill. non Jacq.; Athyrium angustifolium Milde nom. nov. Michx.; Diplazium angustifolium (Milde) Butters; Asplenium pycnocarpon Spreng.; Athyrium pycnocarpon (Spreng.) Tidestr.; Diplaziopsis pycnocarpa (Spreng.) M.G.Price; Diplazium pycnocarpon (Spreng.) M.Broun

= Homalosorus =

Glade fern

Genus of ferns

Homalosorus is a genus of fern with only one species, Homalosorus pycnocarpos. It may also be referred to by its older synonyms Athyrium pycnocarpon and Diplazium pycnocarpon. Commonly referred to as the narrow-leaved glade fern, narrow-leaved-spleenwort, or glade fern, it is endemic to eastern North America and typically grows in moist woodlands. Once classified in the family Athyriaceae due to its linear, often doubled sori, in the Pteridophyte Phylogeny Group classification of 2016 (PPG I), it is placed in the small family Diplaziopsidaceae, whose other three species are native to east Asia. Other sources place the genus in the subfamily Diplaziopsidoideae of a very broadly defined family Aspleniaceae, equivalent to the suborder Aspleniineae in PPG I.

== Description ==
Homalosorus pycnocarpos grows from creeping stems. Its clustered fronds grow to about 90 cm (35 in) long and 15–20 cm (6–8 in) wide. The leaf blade is oblong-lanceolate and once-pinnate. The pinnae are linear and either more-or-less entire or with shallow indentations. The fertile leaves are similar to the sterile leaves, but narrower, with more widely spaced pinnae. The sori are long, straight or slightly curved, borne in two lines along the underside of a leaf pinna. The indusia are thick and prominent. The arrangement of the sori gives rise to its specific epithet pycnocarpos ('crowded fruits').

== Taxonomy ==
The genus Homalosorus was erected by Rudolfo Pichi-Sermolli in 1977. Homalosorus pycnocarpos in its present circumscription was first described by André Michaux in 1803 as Asplenium angustifolium. However, this name was illegitimate, since it had already been used by Nikolaus Joseph von Jacquin in 1786 for a different species of fern. (The description "narrow-leaved" in the English name is a reflection of the original specific epithet: from Latin angustus 'narrow' and folium 'leaf'.) In 1804, Kurt Sprengler published a description of a species he named Asplenium pycnocarpon. He wrote that he doubted that it was the same as Michaux's Asplenium angustifolium, since that species was described as having smooth-edged leaves. However, later authors have regarded the two as synonymous, so that Asplenium pycnocarpon is the first legitimate name, and hence the basionym of Homalosorus pycnocarpos.

=== Classification and phylogeny ===
The species has been placed in several genera. It was first described in Asplenium and later transferred to Athyrium. In 1977, Pichi-Sermolli transferred it to the monotypic genus Homalosorus. The Flora of North America placed it in Diplazium as Diplazium pycnocarpon, noting its similarity to the east Asian species then known as Diplazium flavoviride. It was later shown that Diplazium flavoviride and Homalosorus pycnocarpos (as Diplazium pycnocarpon) were closely related to the genus Diplaziopsis.

Molecular phylogenetic studies in 2011, 2012 and 2017 showed that Homalosorus and Diplaziopsis form a clade, with Homalosorus pycnocarpos sister to the species of Diplaziopsis. In 2011, Maarten J. M. Christenhusz and Xuan-Chun Zhang created the family Diplaziopsidaceae, containing both Diplaziopsis and Homalosorus. Diplaziopsidaceae is accepted in the Pteridophyte Phylogeny Group classification of 2016 (PPG I). Other sources place the genus Homalosorus in the subfamily Diplaziopsidoideae of a very broadly defined family Aspleniaceae, equivalent to the suborder Aspleniineae in PPG I.

== Distribution and habitat ==
Homalosorus pycnocarpos is endemic to eastern North America. It is widespread from southern Ontario to the Gulf of Mexico and west to Minnesota and Arkansas. It grows in moist (mesophytic) woods and ravines in neutral or basic soils, at elevations of 150–1,000 m (500–3,300 ft).
