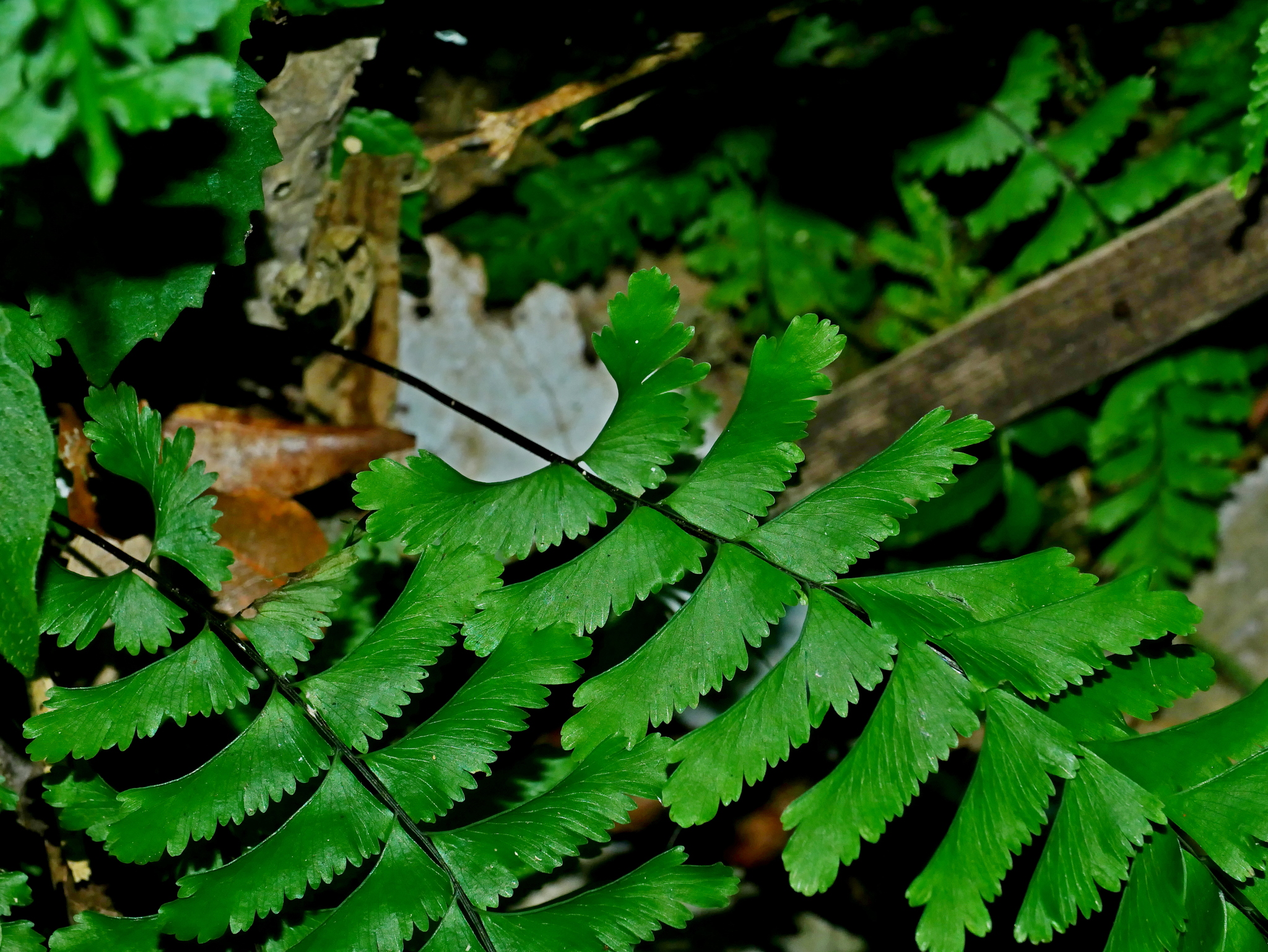
- Hymenasplenium cheilosorum

Scientific classification
- Kingdom: Plantae
- Clade: Tracheophytes
- Division: Polypodiophyta
- Class: Polypodiopsida
- Order: Polypodiales
- Suborder: Aspleniineae
- Family: Aspleniaceae
- Genus: Hymenasplenium; Hayata

Type species
- Hymenasplenium unilaterale (Lam.) Hayata. 1927

Synonyms
- Asplenium section Hymenasplenium (Hayata 1927) Iwatsuki 1975; Asplenium (Hymenasplenium) (Hayata 1927) Bir 1998; Boniniella Hayata 1927; Asplenium series Unilateralia Ching & Wu 1989

= Hymenasplenium =

Genus of ferns

Hymenasplenium is one of three genera of ferns in the Aspleniaceae (spleenwort family), in the eupolypods II clade of the order Polypodiales. The others are Hemidictyum and Asplenium. Hymenasplenium was segregated because it is a natural grouping with differing rhizome morphology – dorsiventral v. radial for the rest of Asplenium, differing chromosome count – x=39 v. x=36 for the rest of Asplenium, and a clear monophyletic grouping based on genetic analysis. It was confirmed as a sister group to Asplenium in a 2015 molecular study of the genera.

== List of species ==
As of October 2026, the Checklist of Ferns and Lycophytes of the World recognized the sixty-seven species and three hybrids below.

- Hymenasplenium amoenum (C.Presl ex Mett.) Ranil
- Hymenasplenium andohahelense Viane
- Hymenasplenium antsirananense Viane
- Hymenasplenium apogamum (N.Murak. & Hatan.) Nakaike
- Hymenasplenium basiscopicum (R.C.Moran & Sundue) L.Regalado & Prada
- Hymenasplenium cardiophyllum (Hance) Nakaike
- Hymenasplenium changputungense (Ching) Viane & S.Y.Dong
- Hymenasplenium cheilosorum (Kunze ex Mett.) Tagawa
- Hymenasplenium chingii K.W.Xu, Li Bing Zhang & W.B.Liao
- Hymenasplenium delitescens (Maxon) L.Regalado & Prada
- Hymenasplenium denticulatum K.W.Xu, Li Bing Zhang & W.B.Liao
- Hymenasplenium distans Li Bing Zhang, K.W.Xu & Liang Zhang
- Hymenasplenium excisum (C.Presl) S.Linds.
- Hymenasplenium filipes (Copel.) Sugim.
- Hymenasplenium furfuraceum (Ching) Viane & S.Y.Dong
- Hymenasplenium guineense Li Bing Zhang, W.B.Liao & K.W.Xu
- Hymenasplenium hastifolium K.W.Xu, Li Bing Zhang & W.B.Liao
- Hymenasplenium hoffmannii (Hieron.) L.Regalado & Prada
- Hymenasplenium hondoense (N.Murak. & Hatan.) Nakaike
- Hymenasplenium hovenkampii K.W.Xu & Li Bing Zhang
- Hymenasplenium ikenoi (Makino) Viane
- Hymenasplenium inthanonense N.Murak. & J.Yokoy.
- Hymenasplenium kenyense Li Bing Zhang, K.W.Xu & Kamau
- Hymenasplenium kinabaluense Li Bing Zhang & K.W.Xu
- Hymenasplenium laetum (Sw.) L.Regalado & Prada
- Hymenasplenium latedens (Ching) Viane & S.Y.Dong
- Hymenasplenium laterepens N.Murak. & X.Cheng ex Y.Fen Chang & K.Hori
- Hymenasplenium madagascariense Li Bing Zhang, W.B.Liao & K.W.Xu
- Hymenasplenium murakami-hatanakae Nakaike
- Hymenasplenium neocaledonicum Li Bing Zhang & K.W.Xu
- Hymenasplenium ngheanense Li Bing Zhang, K.W.Xu & N.T.Lu
- Hymenasplenium nigricostatum Li Bing Zhang & K.W.Xu
- Hymenasplenium obliquissimum (Hayata) Sugim.
- Hymenasplenium obscurum (Blume) Tagawa
- Hymenasplenium obtusidentatum Y.Fen Chang & G.Cheng Zhang
- Hymenasplenium obtusifolium (L.) L.Regalado & Prada
- Hymenasplenium ofeliae (Salgado) Barcelona & Pelser
- Hymenasplenium oligosorum Li Bing Zhang, K.W.Xu & Lorence
- Hymenasplenium ortegae (N.Murak. & R.C.Moran) L.Regalado & Prada
- Hymenasplenium perriei Li Bing Zhang & K.W.Xu
- Hymenasplenium phamhoanghoi Li Bing Zhang, K.W.Xu & T.T.Luong
- Hymenasplenium praestans (Copel.) Testo, Riibe & Sundue
- Hymenasplenium pseudobscurum Viane
- Hymenasplenium pubirhizoma (Ching & Z.Y.Liu) K.W.Xu & Li Bing Zhang
- Hymenasplenium purpurascens (Mett.) L.Regalado & Prada
- Hymenasplenium quangnamense Li Bing Zhang, K.W.Xu & Liang Zhang
- Hymenasplenium queenslandicum Li Bing Zhang & K.W.Xu
- Hymenasplenium quercicola (Ching) Viane & S.Y.Dong
- Hymenasplenium repandulum (Kunze) L.Regalado & Prada
- Hymenasplenium riparium (Liebm.) L.Regalado & Prada
- Hymenasplenium rivulare (Fraser-Jenk.) Viane & S.Y.Dong
- Hymenasplenium sabahense Li Bing Zhang, K.W.Xu & C.W.Chen
- Hymenasplenium samoaense Li Bing Zhang, K.W.Xu & K.R.Wood
- Hymenasplenium sinense K.W.Xu, Li Bing Zhang & W.B.Liao
- Hymenasplenium solomonense Li Bing Zhang & K.W.Xu
- Hymenasplenium speluncicola Li Bing Zhang, K.W.Xu & H.He
- Hymenasplenium subnormale (Copel.) Nakaike
- Hymenasplenium szechuanense (Ching) Viane & S.Y.Dong
- Hymenasplenium tholiforme Liang Zhang, W.B.Ju & K.W.Xu
- Hymenasplenium trapeziforme (Wall. ex Roxb.) comb.ined., Asplenium trapeziforme Wall. ex Roxb.
- Hymenasplenium triquetrum (N.Murak. & R.C.Moran) L.Regalado & Prada
- Hymenasplenium unilaterale (Lam.) Hayata
- Hymenasplenium vanuatuense Li Bing Zhang & K.W.Xu
- Hymenasplenium volubile (N.Murak. & R.C.Moran) L.Regalado & Prada
- Hymenasplenium wangpeishanii Li Bing Zhang & K.W.Xu
- Hymenasplenium wildii (Bail.) D.J.Ohlsen
- Hymenasplenium wusugongii Li Bing Zhang, W.B.Liao & K.W.Xu

=== Hybrids ===
- Hymenasplenium × doanyense Viane
- Hymenasplenium × excurum Viane
- Hymenasplenium × incisoserratum (Rosenst.) comb.ined., Asplenium × incisoserratum (Rosenst.) N.Murak. & R.C.Moran

== Phylogeny ==
Phylogeny from Fern Tree of Life

- Hymenasplenium
  - - - H. delitescens (Maxon) Regalado & Prada
      - H. hoffmannii (Hieronymus) Regalado & Prada
    - - - H. laetum (Swartz) Regalado & Prada
        - H. praestans (Copeland) Testo, Riibe & Sundue
      - - H. triquetrum (N.Murak. & Moran) Regalado & Prada
        - - H. riparium (Liebmann) Regalado & Prada
          - H. volubile (N.Murak. & Moran) Regalado & Prada
  - - - - H. phamhoanghoi Zhang, Xu & Luong
        - - - H. excisum (Presl) S.Linds. 2009 (Scalloped spleenwort)
            - H. obscurum (Blume) Tagawa
          - - H. tholiforme Zhang, Ju & Xu
            - - H. pseudobscurum Viane
              - H. obtusidentatum Chang & Zhang
      - - H. cheilosorum
        - - - H. amoenum (Presl ex Mettenius) Ranil
            - - H. filipes (Copeland) Sugim.
              - H. obliquissimum (Hayata) Sugim.
          - - H. szechuanense (Ching) Viane & Dong
            - - H. furfuraceum (Ching) Viane & Dong
              - - H. latidens (Ching) Viane & Dong
                - H. quercicola (Ching) Viane & Dong
    - - - H. subnormale (Copeland) Nakaike
        - H. wildii (Bail.) Ohlsen
      - - - H. distans Zhang, Xu & Zhang
          - - H. apogamum (N.Murak. & Hatan.) Nakaike
            - - H. ngheanense Zhang, Xu & Lu
              - - H. laterepens N.Murak. & Cheng ex Chang & Hori
                - H. unilaterale (Lam.) Hayata
        - - - H. cardiophyllum (Hance) Nakaike
            - - H. quangnamense Zhang, Xu & Zhang
              - - H. hastifolium Xu, Zhang & Liao
                - H. pubirhizoma (Ching & Liu) Xu & Zhang
          - - H. chingii Xu, Zhang & Liao
            - - H. wangpeishanii Zhang & Xu
              - - H. hondoense (N.Murak. & Hatan.) Nakaike
                - H. speluncicola Zhang, Xu & He
