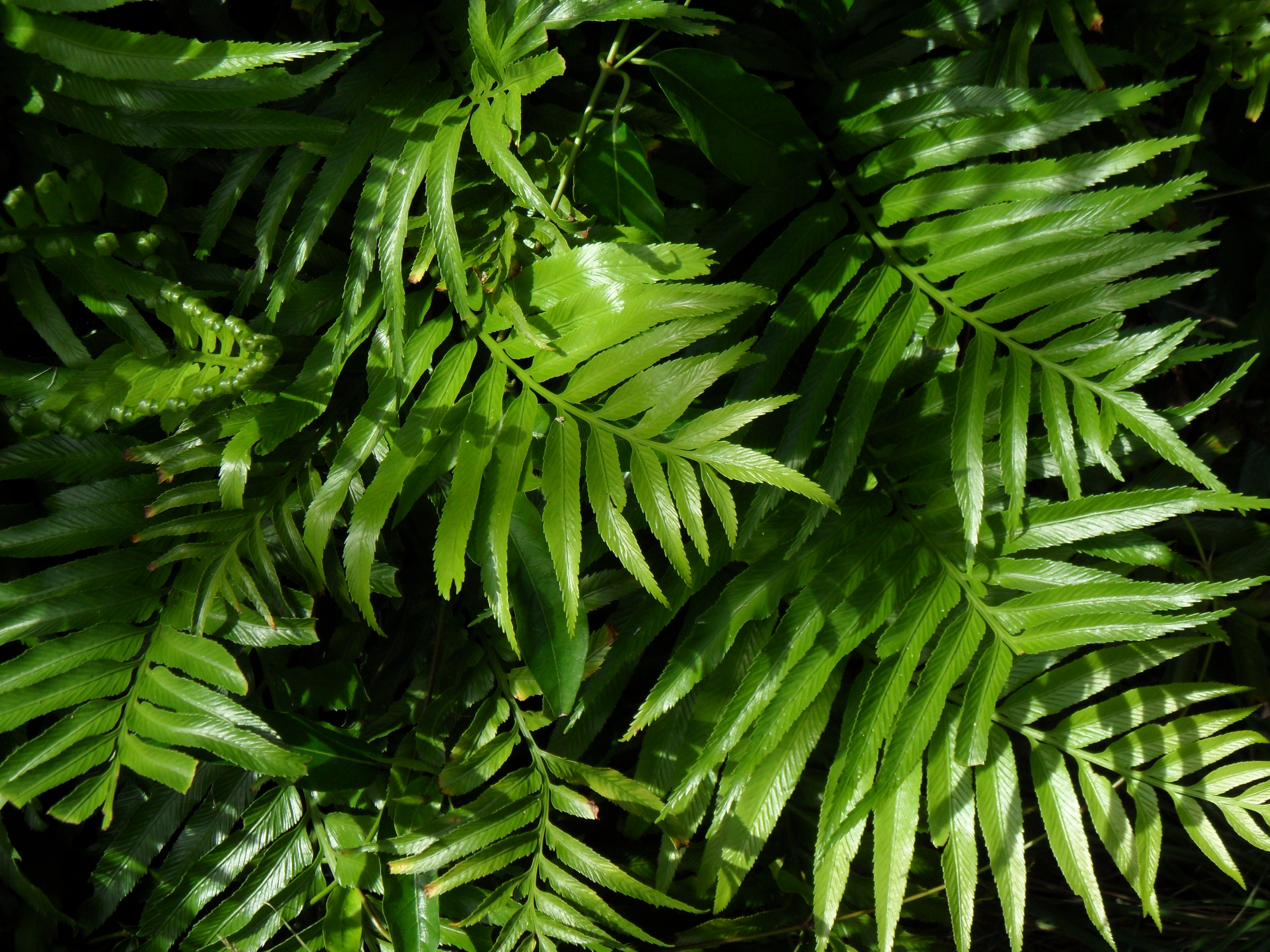

Scientific classification
- Kingdom: Plantae
- Clade: Tracheophytes
- Division: Polypodiophyta
- Class: Polypodiopsida
- Order: Polypodiales
- Suborder: Aspleniineae
- Family: Aspleniaceae
- Genus: Asplenium
- Species: A. milnei

Binomial name
- Asplenium milnei Carruth.

Synonyms
- Asplenium lucidum G.Forst.

= Asplenium milnei =

Species of fern in the spleenwort family

Asplenium milnei is a ground fern only found on Lord Howe Island. Commonly seen in lowland areas.

== Taxonomy ==
A global phylogeny of Asplenium published in 2020 divided the genus into eleven clades, which were given informal names pending further taxonomic study. A. milnei belongs to the "Neottopteris clade", members of which generally have somewhat leathery leaf tissue. It forms a clade with A. pteridoides and A. surrogatum, two other Lord Howe Island endemics, suggesting that all three species diverged after a single colonization of the island by their ancestor. This clade is sister to a large group of Pacific Ocean spleenworts.
