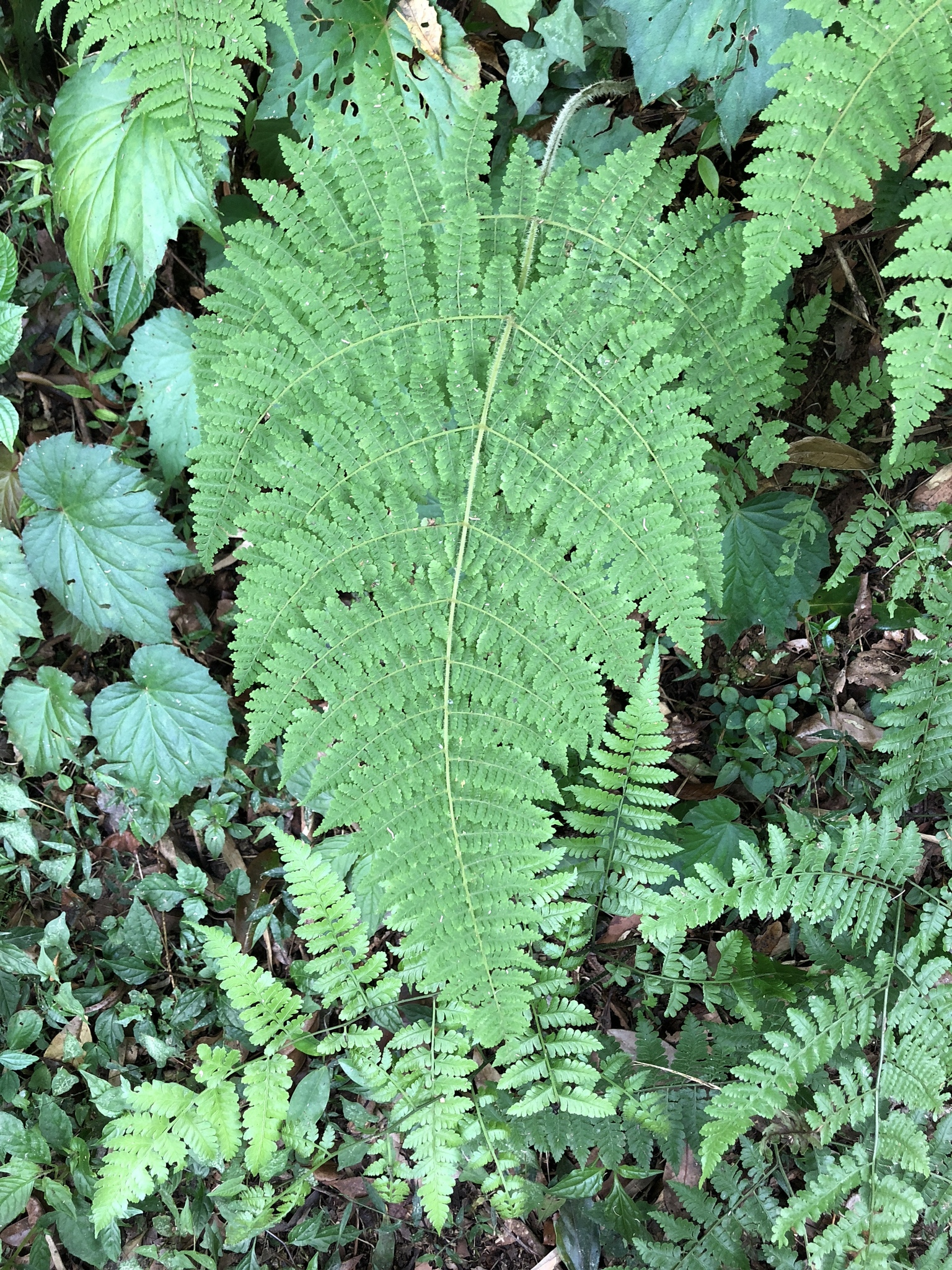
- Acystopteris tenuisecta

Scientific classification
- Kingdom: Plantae
- Clade: Tracheophytes
- Division: Polypodiophyta
- Class: Polypodiopsida
- Order: Polypodiales
- Suborder: Aspleniineae
- Family: Cystopteridaceae
- Genus: Acystopteris; Nakai (1933)

Type species
- Acystopteris japonica (Luerssen) Nakai

Synonyms
- Cystopteris (Acystopteris) (Nakai 1933) Blasdell 1963

= Acystopteris =

Genus of ferns

Acystopteris is a genus of ferns in the family Cystopteridaceae.

== Phylogeny ==
This genus includes the following species:

Phylogeny from Fern Tree of Life

- Acystopteris
  - A. japonica (Luerssen) Nakai 1933
  - - A. taiwaniana (Tagawa) Á.Löve & D.Löve 1977
    - A. tenuisecta (Blume) Tagawa 1938
