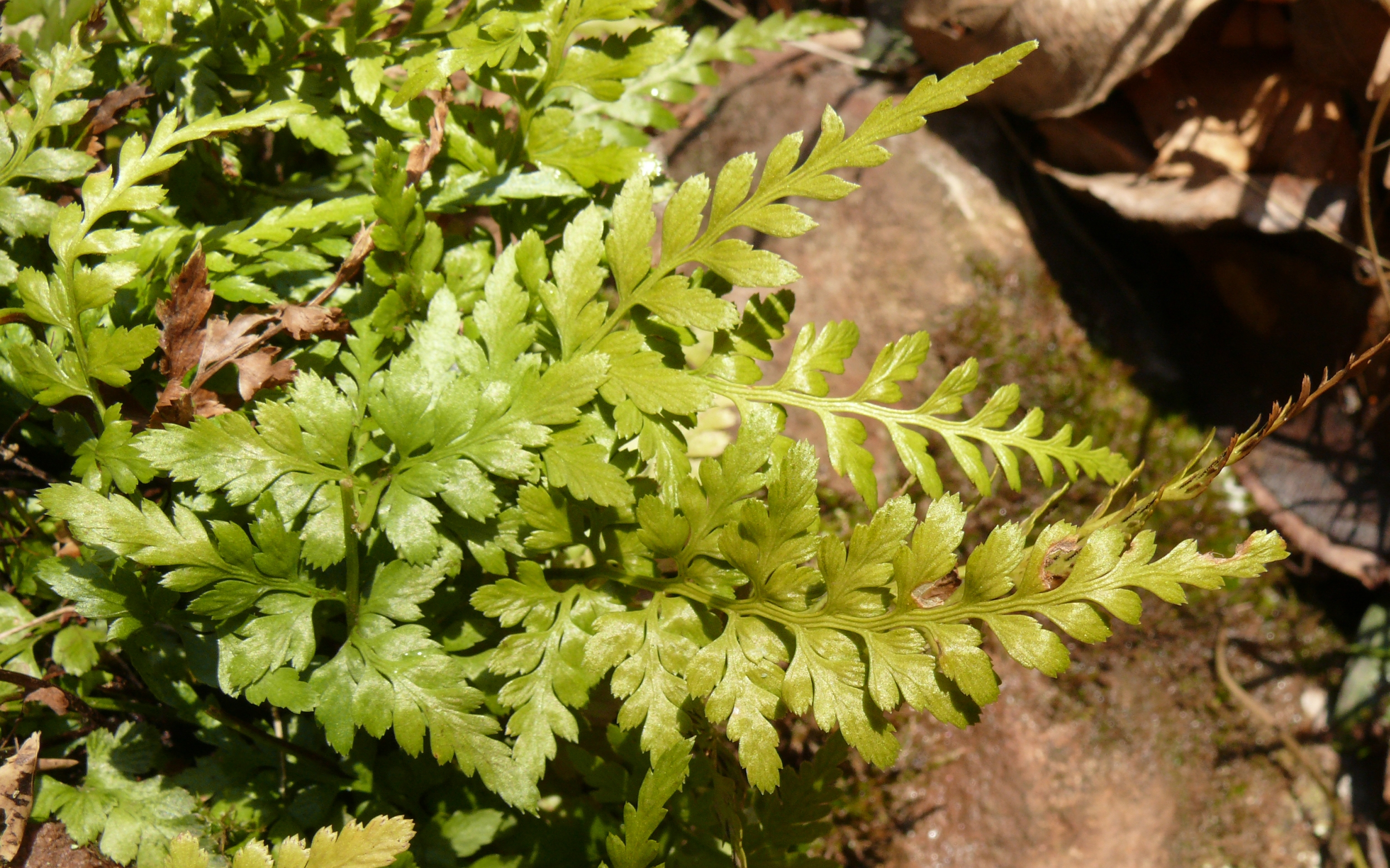

Conservation status
- Secure (NatureServe)

Scientific classification
- Kingdom: Plantae
- Clade: Tracheophytes
- Division: Polypodiophyta
- Class: Polypodiopsida
- Order: Polypodiales
- Suborder: Aspleniineae
- Family: Aspleniaceae
- Genus: Asplenium
- Species: A. adiantum-nigrum

Binomial name
- Asplenium adiantum-nigrum L.

Synonyms
- Asplenium andrewsii A.Nelson; Asplenium lucidum Burm.f.

= Asplenium adiantum-nigrum =

Species of fern in the spleenwort family

Asplenium adiantum-nigrum is a common species of fern known by the common name black spleenwort. It is found mostly in Africa, Europe, and Eurasia, but is also native to a few locales in Mexico and the United States.

== Description ==
This spleenwort has thick, triangular leaf blades up to 10 centimetres (3.9 in) long which are divided into several subdivided segments. It is borne on a reddish green petiole and the rachis is shiny and slightly hairy. The undersides of each leaf segment have one or more sori arranged in chains.

== Taxonomy ==
Linnaeus was the first to describe black spleenwort with the binomial Asplenium adiantum-nigrum in his Species Plantarum of 1753.

A chloroplast phylogeny verified the allopolyploid origin of A. adiantum-nigrum, with A. cuneifolium supplying the paternal genome and A. onopteris the maternal genome.

== Native distribution ==
Asplenium adiantum-nigrum is native to:
Africa

- Northern and Southern Africa in: Algeria; Lesotho; Morocco; the provinces of South Africa including Eastern Cape, Free State, Gauteng, KwaZulu-Natal, Limpopo, Mpumalanga, Northern Cape, and Western Cape; and Tunisia.

Asia

- Western Asia and Central Asia in - the Caucasus; Azerbaijan; Cyprus; the Sinai Peninsula of Egypt; Kyrgyzstan; Ciscaucasia and Dagestan in Russia; and Turkey.

Europe

- Albania; Austria; Belgium; Bulgaria; the Czech Republic; Denmark; Finland; France (including Corsica); Germany; Greece; Hungary; Ireland; Italy (including Sardinia); the Netherlands; Norway; Poland; Portugal, Romania; Spain; Sweden; Switzerland; Ukraine (including Krym); the United Kingdom; and in the Balkan Peninsula (former Yugoslavia)

Macaronesia

- Macaronesian archipelagoes of: the Azores, Madeira, the Canary Islands.

North America

- Southwestern United States – Arizona, Colorado, and Utah

Oceania

- Hawaii

In Hawaii, this native fern grows on cinder cones and lava flows, and it is present in Hawaii Volcanoes National Park.
