= Cystopteris chinensis =

Conservation status
- Critically Endangered (IUCN 3.1)

Scientific classification
- Kingdom: Plantae
- Clade: Tracheophytes
- Division: Polypodiophyta
- Class: Polypodiopsida
- Order: Polypodiales
- Suborder: Aspleniineae
- Family: Cystopteridaceae
- Genus: Cystopteris
- Species: C. chinensis

Binomial name
- Cystopteris chinensis (Ching) R.Wei & X.C.Zhang

Synonyms
- Cystoathyrium chinense Ching

Species of fern

Cystopteris chinensis is a species of fern in the family Cystopteridaceae. It was formerly placed as the sole species in the genus Cystoathyrium, not recognized in the Pteridophyte Phylogeny Group classification of 2016 (PPG I). The forest in Sichuan, China from which the species was originally described in 1963 has since disappeared, and only one individual plant of this species was found in the remaining bush.
