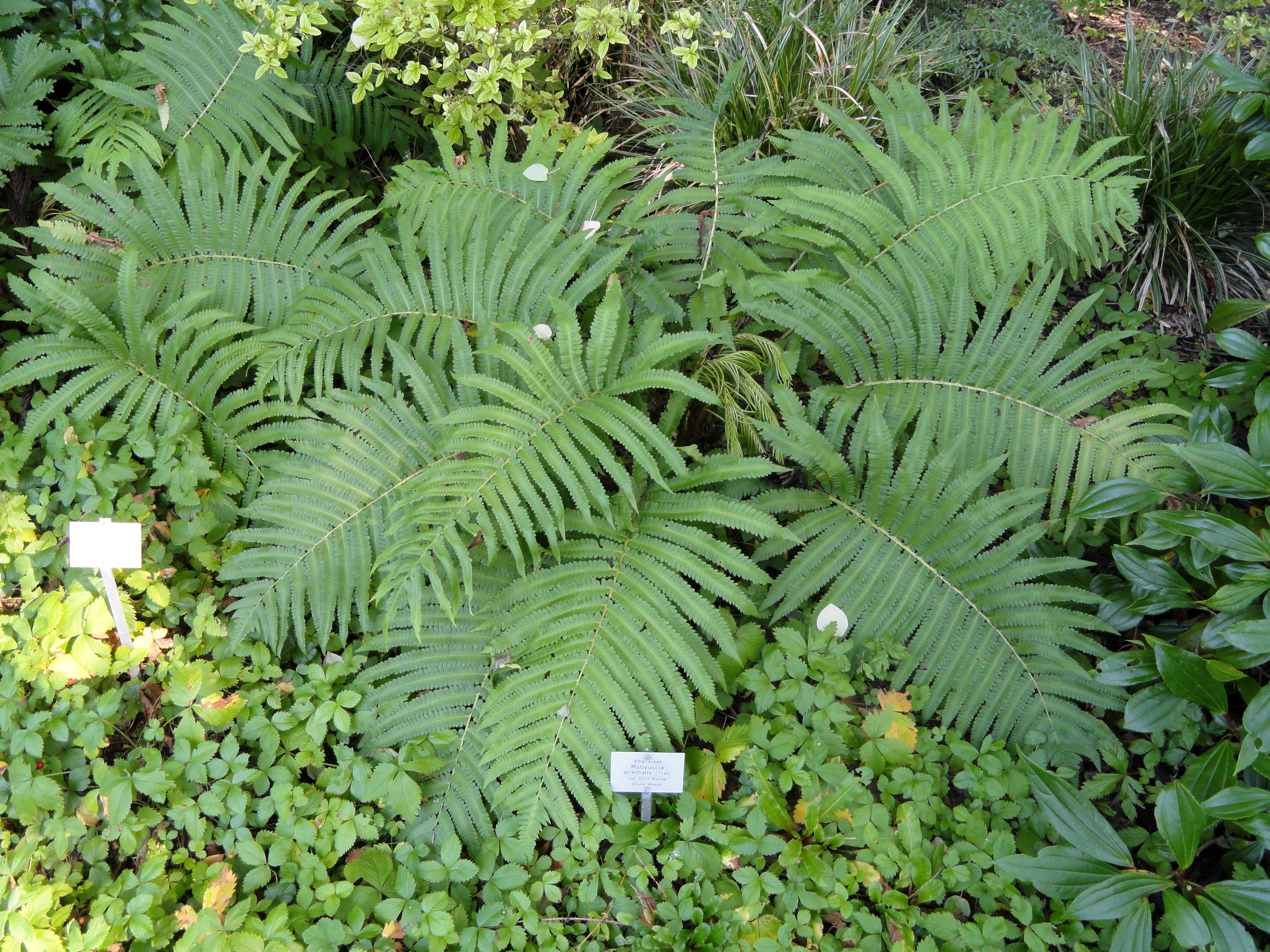
- Pentarhizidium orientale

Scientific classification
- Kingdom: Plantae
- Clade: Embryophytes
- Clade: Tracheophytes
- Division: Polypodiophyta
- Class: Polypodiopsida
- Order: Polypodiales
- Suborder: Aspleniineae
- Family: Onocleaceae
- Genus: Pentarhizidium; Hayata 1928

Type species
- Pentarhizidium japonicum Hayata 1928

Species
- P. intermedium; P. orientale

Synonyms
- Onoclea section Pentarhizidium (Hayata 1928) Kato 1980

= Pentarhizidium =

Genus of ferns

Pentarhizidium is a genus of two Asian fern species. These species have formerly been included in Matteuccia or Onoclea. Recent genetic analysis has determined that these two species form a discrete clade that is basal to the rest of this fern group, and so have been located in their own genus. P. orientale is sometimes grown as a garden plant.

== Species ==
- Pentarhizidium intermedium (Christensen 1913) Hayata 1928
- Pentarhizidium orientale (Hooker 1860) Hayata 1928
