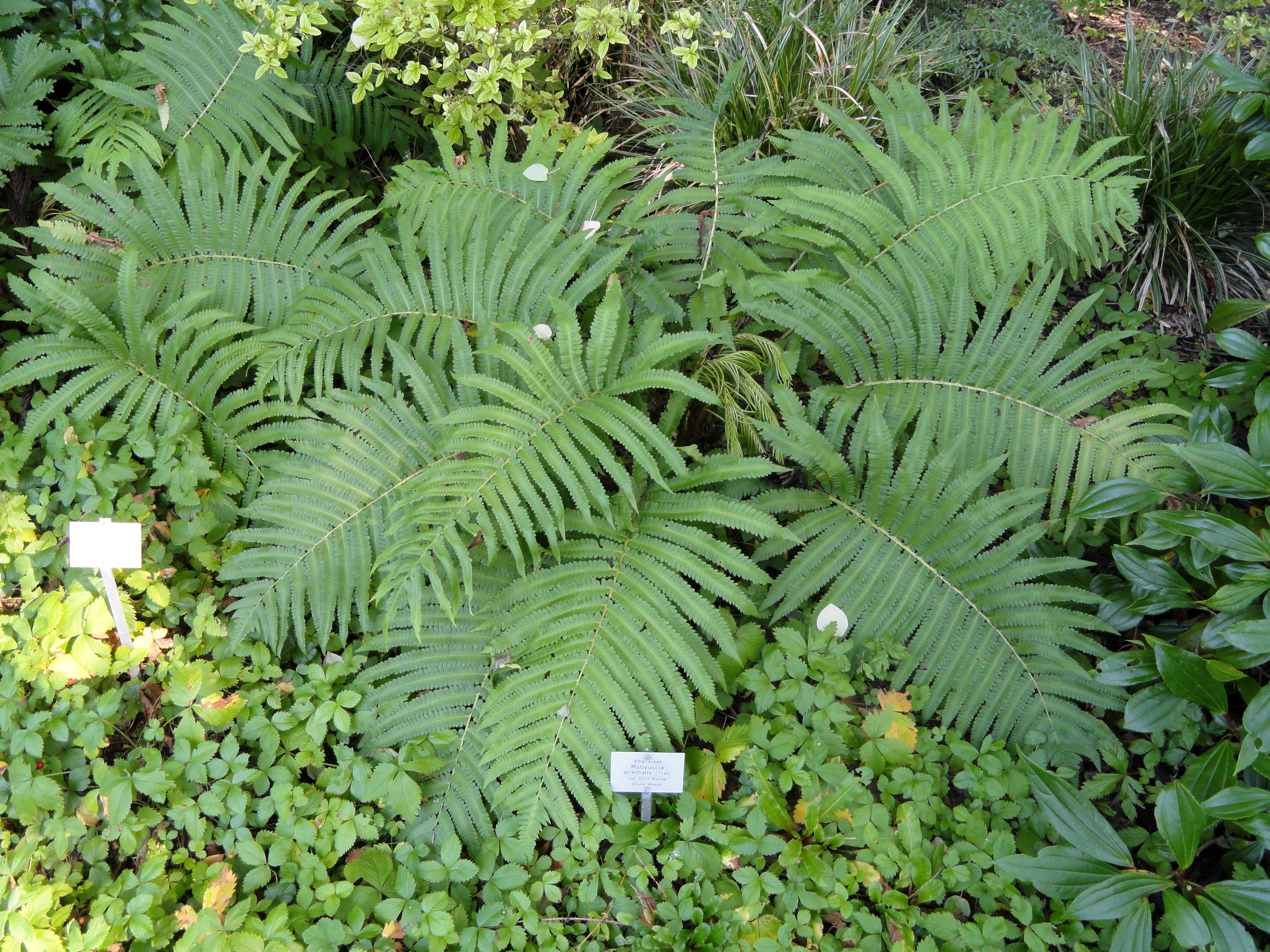

Scientific classification
- Kingdom: Plantae
- Clade: Tracheophytes
- Division: Polypodiophyta
- Class: Polypodiopsida
- Order: Polypodiales
- Suborder: Aspleniineae
- Family: Onocleaceae
- Genus: Pentarhizidium
- Species: P. orientale

Binomial name
- Pentarhizidium orientale (Hook.) Hayata

Synonyms
- Matteuccia orientalis (Hook.) Trevis.; Onoclea orientalis (Hook.) Hook.; Pentarhizidium orientale (Hook.) Hayata; Pteretis orientalis Ching; Struthiopteris orientalis Hook.

= Pentarhizidium orientale =

Species of fern

Pentarhizidium orientale, the Oriental ostrich fern, is a fern native to China, Japan, and the Himalayas. It grows to about 0.6 m (2 ft) in height by 0.6 m (2 ft) wide. It was formerly included in the genus Matteuccia, but phylogenetic studies mandated that it and Pentarhizidium intermedium be moved to a new genus.
