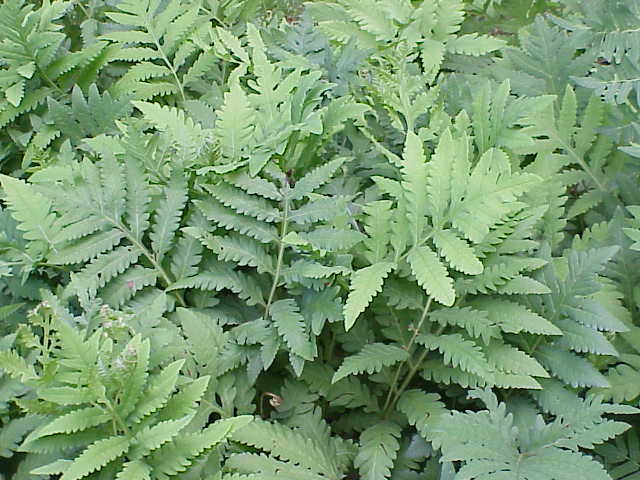

Scientific classification
- Kingdom: Plantae
- Clade: Tracheophytes
- Division: Polypodiophyta
- Class: Polypodiopsida
- Order: Polypodiales
- Suborder: Aspleniineae
- Family: Onocleaceae
- Genus: Onoclea; L.

Type species
- Onoclea sensibilis von Linné

Synonyms
- Angiopteris Mitch. ex Adans. nom. illeg., non Hoffm.; Calypterium Bernh. nom. superfl.; Pteridinodes Siegesb. ex Kuntze nom. superfl.; Ragiopteris C.Presl; Riedlea Mirb. nom. superfl. non Ventenat

= Onoclea =

Onoclea Temporal range: Late Cretaceous-Holocene, 85.7–0 Ma (Santonian-Recent)

Genus of ferns

Onoclea is a genus of plants in the family Onocleaceae, native to moist habitats in eastern Asia and eastern North America. They are deciduous ferns with sterile fronds arising from creeping rhizomes in spring, dying down at first frost. Fertile fronds appear in late summer. Depending on the authority, the genus contains one to five species.

== Species ==
In the Pteridophyte Phylogeny Group classification of 2016 (PPG I), Onoclea has a single living species:

- †O. fecunda (Lesquereux 1873) Knowlton 1898
- †O. glossopteroides (Dawson 1884) Krassilov 1979
- †O. grandifolia Akhmetiev 1969
- †O. hebridica Gardner 1886
- †O. minima Knowlton 1899
- †O. reducta Cockerell 1908
- O. sensibilis L. (sensitive fern (eastern Asia, eastern North America))

=== Transferred species ===
The following Onoclea species have been transferred to other genera as indicated below.

- Onoclea attenuata Sw. = Lomaridium attenuatum (Sw.) Gasper & V.A.O.Dittrich
- Onoclea boryana Sw. = Lomariocycas tabularis (Thunb.) Gasper & A.R.Sm.
- Onoclea hintonii (F.Ballard) Christenh. = Onocleopsis hintonii F.Ballard
- Onoclea intermedia (C.Chr.) M.Kato, T.Suzuki & Nakato = Pentarhizidium intermedium (C.Chr.) Hayata
- Onoclea lineata (Sw.) Sw. = Parablechnum lineatum (Sw.) Gasper & Salino
- Onoclea nuda Labill. = Lomaria nuda (Labill.) Willd.
- Onoclea orientalis (Hook.) Hook. = Pentarhizidium orientale (Hook.) Hayata
- Onoclea pensylvanica (Willd.) Sm. = Matteuccia struthiopteris var. pensylvanica (Willd.) Morton
- Onoclea polypodioides (Sw.) Sw., nom. illeg. = Lomaridium fragile (Liebm.) Gasper & V.A.O.Dittrich
- Onoclea polypodioides L. = Gleichenia polypodioides (L.) Sm.
- Onoclea scandens Sw., nom. illeg. superfl. = Stenochlaena palustris (Burm.fil.) Bedd.
- Onoclea spicant (L.) Hoffm. = Struthiopteris spicant (L.) Weiss – deer fern (Europe, western North America)
- Onoclea spicata (L.f.) Sw. = Lepisorus spicatus (L.f.) Li Wang
- Onoclea striatum Sw. = Parablechnum ryanii (Kaulf.) Gasper & Salino
- Onoclea struthiopteris (L.) Hoffm. = Matteuccia struthiopteris (L.) Tod.
