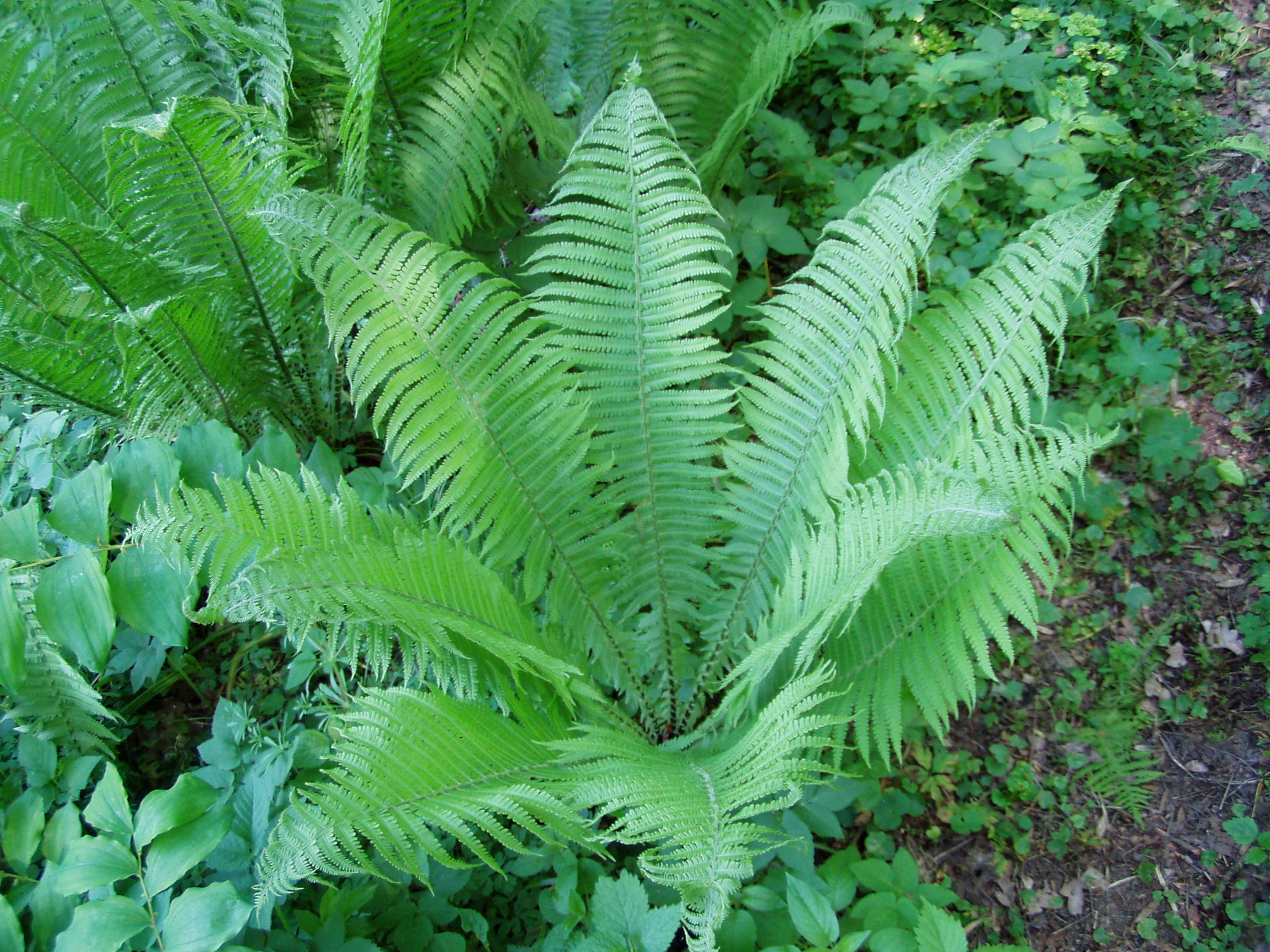

Scientific classification
- Kingdom: Plantae
- Clade: Tracheophytes
- Division: Polypodiophyta
- Class: Polypodiopsida
- Order: Polypodiales
- Suborder: Aspleniineae
- Family: Onocleaceae; Pic.Serm.

Genera
- Matteuccia; Onoclea; Onocleopsis; Pentarhizidium

Synonyms
- Onocleeae Todaro 1866; Onocleinae Diels 1899; Onocleoideae Nayar 1970

= Onocleaceae =

Family of ferns

Onocleaceae is a small family of terrestrial ferns in the order Polypodiales. It is placed in the suborder Aspleniineae in the Pteridophyte Phylogeny Group classification of 2016 (PPG I). Alternatively, the family, along with Blechnaceae, may be placed in a very broadly defined family Aspleniaceae as the subfamily Blechnoideae. The family may contain from one to four genera, consisting of five species largely in north temperate climes. The four genera, Matteuccia, Onoclea, Onocleopsis and Pentarhizidium, may be included under the single genus Onoclea.

== Description ==
Members of the family have the following characteristics, being distinguished by having strongly dimorphic fronds, with the fertile fronds different from the sterile fronds. The rhizomes are long- to short-creeping to ascending, and sometimes stoloniferous (Matteuccia and Onocleopsis). The leaves are strongly dimorphic and the petioles have two vascular bundles uniting distally into a gutter-shape. The blades are pinnatifid or pinnate-pinnatifid. The veins are free or anastomosing, lacking included veinlets. The spores are reniform, brownish to green. The sori are enclosed (sometimes tightly) by reflexed laminar margins, also with membranous, often fugacious true indusia.

== Taxonomy ==
Formerly, the two species in the genus Pentarhizidium were considered to be members of Matteuccia, but genetic analysis has determined that they compose a basal sister clade to the rest of the family. This family has been determined by genetic analysis to be closely allied to the Blechnaceae, within the clade of families sometimes known as Blechnales (which includes the athyrioid ferns and asplenioid ferns as well) (this clade is often treated as part of the order Polypodiales however). Matteuccia struthiopteris was previously classified under the Dryopteridaceae, and still is by the USDA.

=== Phylogeny ===
The following cladogram for the suborder Aspleniineae (as eupolypods II), based on Lehtonen (2011), and Rothfels & al. (2012), shows a likely phylogenetic relationship between the Onocleaceae and the other families of the clade. A molecular phylogenetic analysis in 2011 suggested that the four Onocleacae genera are so closely related that they could be included under the single genus Onoclea. A possible phylogenic relationship between Onocleaceae species (line lengths are not significant) is shown below. The Pteridophyte Phylogeny Group classification of 2016 (PPG I) maintained the four genera.

External phylogeny

- Aspleniineae (eupolypods II)
  - Cystopteridaceae
  - - - Rhachidosoraceae
      - - Diplaziopsidaceae
        - - Aspleniaceae
          - Hemidictyaceae
    - - Thelypteridaceae
      - - Woodsiaceae
        - - - Onocleaceae
            - Blechnaceae
          - Athyriaceae

Internal phylogeny from Fern Tree of Life

- Onocleaceae
  - Pentarhizidium Hayata ex Hayata
  - - Onoclea von Linné
    - - Matteuccia Todaro
      - Onocleopsis Ballard

=== Species ===
Four genera, with a total of five species, are accepted.

- Matteuccia
  - Matteuccia struthiopteris (ostrich fern) - wide distribution including North America, Europe, and Asia
- Onoclea
  - Onoclea sensibilis (sensitive fern) - North America and eastern Asia, with the American and Asian populations being recognized as distinct varieties
- Onocleopsis
  - Onocleopsis hintonii - found in a restricted range of wet mountain canyons in southern Mexico and Guatemala; some botanists (especially Masahiro Kato) consider this to be a species of Matteuccia
- Pentarhizidium
  - Pentarhizidium orientale - eastern Asia as far south as the Himalayas
  - Pentarhizidium intermedium - China to India
