= Rhachidosorus =

Scientific classification
- Kingdom: Plantae
- Clade: Tracheophytes
- Division: Polypodiophyta
- Class: Polypodiopsida
- Order: Polypodiales
- Suborder: Aspleniineae
- Family: Rhachidosoraceae; X.C.Zhang
- Genus: Rhachidosorus; Ching

Species
- See text

Synonyms
- Rhachidosoroideae M.L.Wang & Y.T.Hsieh

Genus of ferns

Rhachidosorus is a genus of ferns in the order Polypodiales. It is the only genus in the family Rhachidosoraceae in the Pteridophyte Phylogeny Group classification of 2016 (PPG I). Alternatively, the genus may be placed in the subfamily Rhachidosoroideae of a more broadly defined family Aspleniaceae, the family placement used in Plants of the World Online as of November 2019.

== Species ==
The genus was described by Ren Chang Ching in 1964, with about 7 species in eastern and southeastern Asia, including Japan, the Philippines, and Sumatra. As of November 2019, Plants of the World Online accepted the following species:

- Rhachidosorus blotianus Ching – China, Vietnam
- Rhachidosorus chrysocarpus (Alderw.) Ching
- Rhachidosorus consimilis Ching – China (Guizhou, Sichuan, Yunnan)
- Rhachidosorus mesosorus (Makino) Ching – China, Japan, South Korea
- Rhachidosorus pulcher (Tagawa) Ching – Taiwan, Yunnan
- Rhachidosorus siamensis S.Linds.
- Rhachidosorus stramineus (Copel.) Ching
- Rhachidosorus truncatus Ching – China (Guangxi, Guizhou, Yunnan)

== Phylogeny ==
External phylogeny from Lehtonen 2011 and Rothfels & al. 2012

- Aspleniineae (eupolypods II)
  - Cystopteridaceae
  - - - Rhachidosoraceae
      - - Diplaziopsidaceae
        - - Aspleniaceae
          - Hemidictyaceae
    - - Thelypteridaceae
      - - Woodsiaceae
        - - - Onocleaceae
            - Blechnaceae
          - Athyriaceae

Internal phylogeny of Rhachidosorus

- Rhachidosorus
  - R. mesosorus (Makino) Ching
  - - R. blotianus Ching
    - - R. consimilis Ching
      - R. pulcher (Tagawa) Ching
