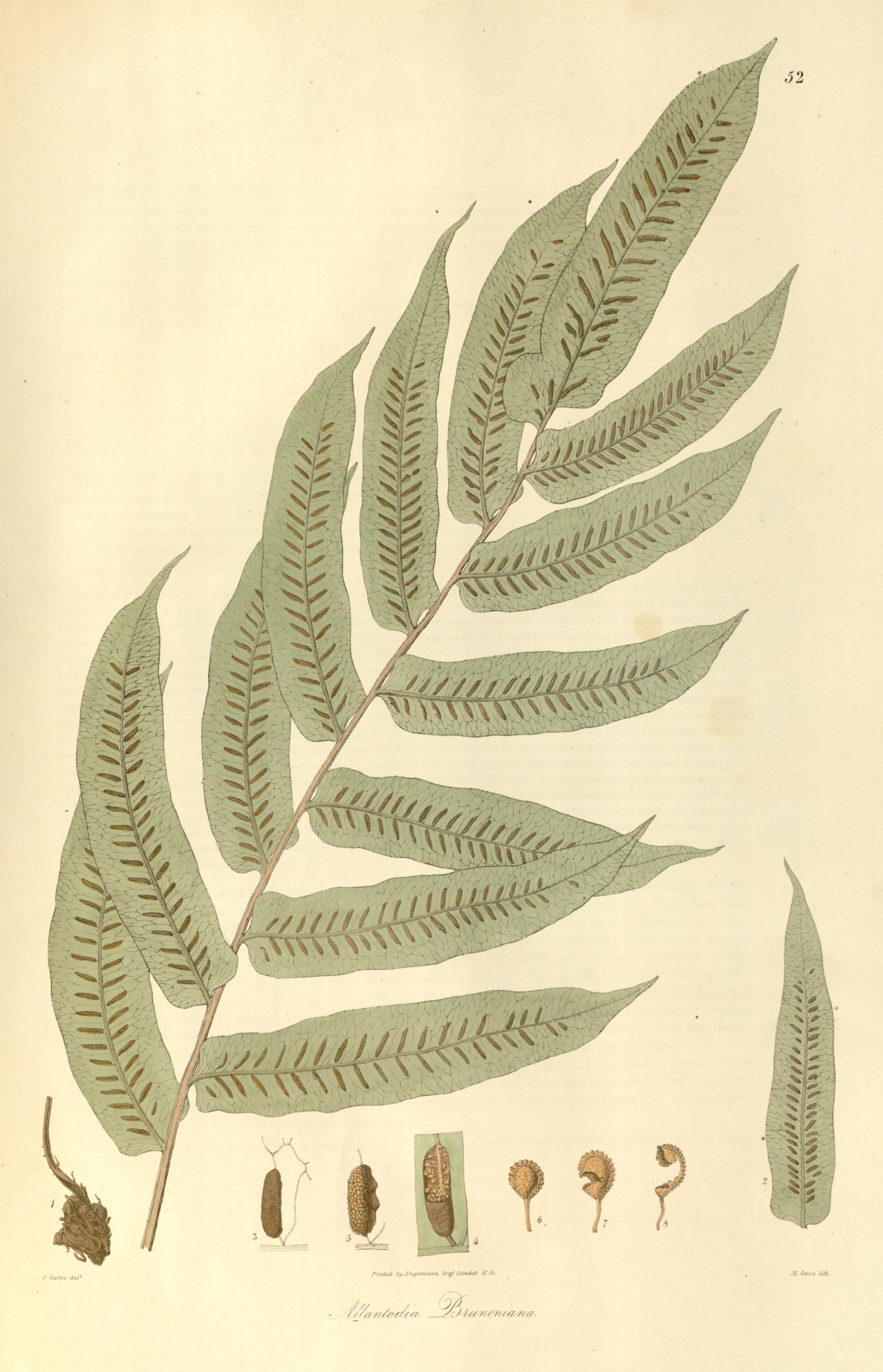
- Diplaziopsis javanica

Scientific classification
- Kingdom: Plantae
- Clade: Tracheophytes
- Division: Polypodiophyta
- Class: Polypodiopsida
- Order: Polypodiales
- Suborder: Aspleniineae
- Family: Diplaziopsidaceae
- Genus: Diplaziopsis; C.Chr.

Species
- D. cavaleriana; D. flavoviridis; D. javanica

Synonyms
- Allantodia Wallich 1830 non Brown 1810

= Diplaziopsis =

Genus of ferns

Diplaziopsis is a genus of ferns in the family Diplaziopsidaceae. The genus name means 'like Diplazium'.

== Species ==
As of January 2020, the Checklist of Ferns and Lycophytes of the World and Plants of the World Online accepted three species:

- Diplaziopsis cavaleriana (Christ) C.Chr.
- Diplaziopsis flavoviridis (Alston) Christenh.
- Diplaziopsis javanica (Blume) C.Chr.
