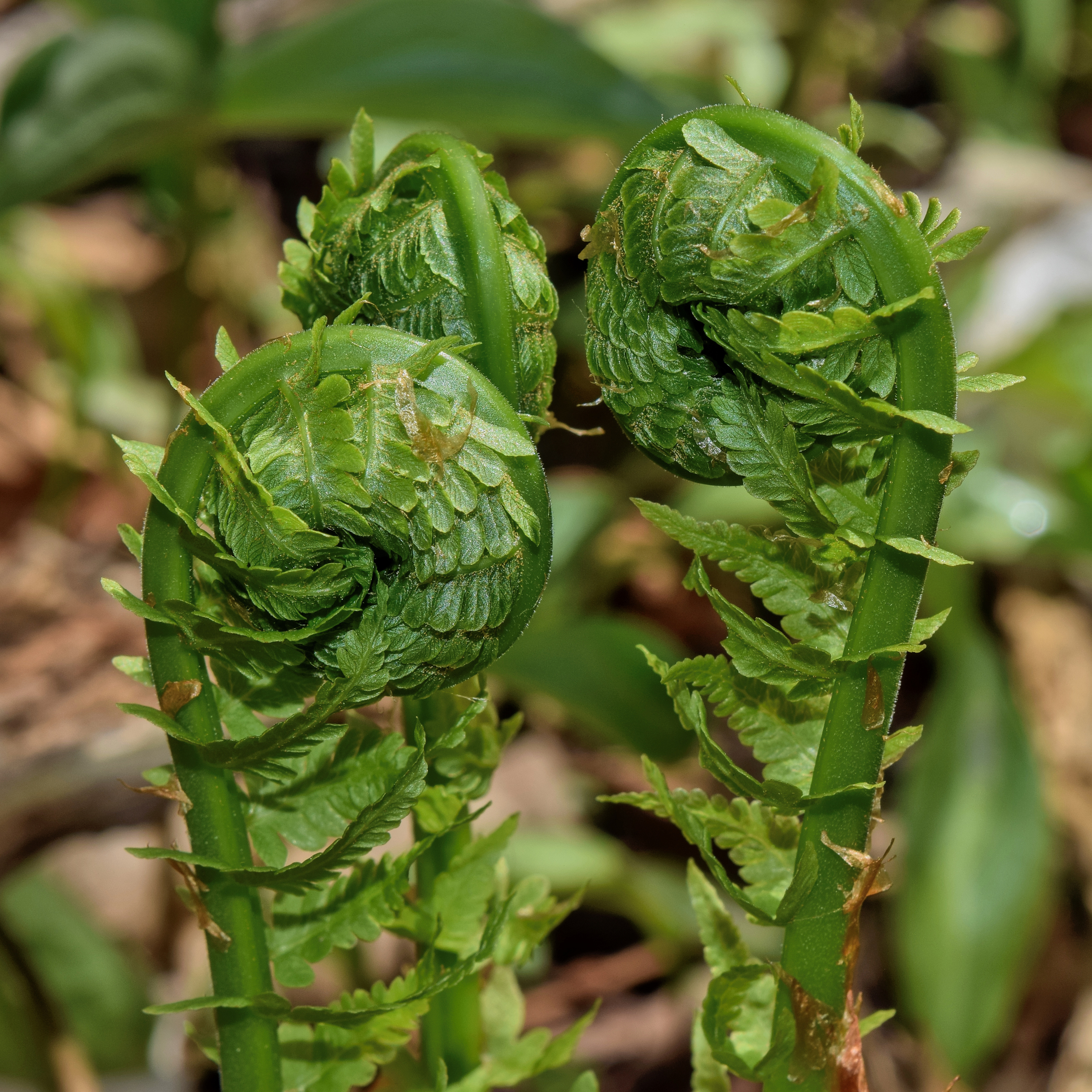
- Ostrich fern in Stouffville (Ontario, Canada).

Scientific classification
- Kingdom: Plantae
- Clade: Tracheophytes
- Division: Polypodiophyta
- Class: Polypodiopsida
- Order: Polypodiales
- Suborder: Aspleniineae
- Family: Onocleaceae
- Genus: Matteuccia; Tod.
- Species: M. struthiopteris

Binomial name
- Matteuccia struthiopteris (L.) Tod.

Synonyms
- 18 Synonyms: Pteretis Rafinesque 1818 nom. rej.; Struthiopteris Willdenow 1809 non Scopoli 1760 non Bernhardi 1801 non Weiss 1770 non Hall.; Matteuccia pensylvanica (Willd.) Raymond; Matteuccia pubescens (Terry) Clute; Matteuccia struthiopteris f. pubescens (Terry) Clute; Matteuccia struthiopteris var. pensylvanica (Willd.) C.V.Morton; Matteuccia struthiopteris var. pubescens (Terry) Clute; Onoclea struthiopteris (L.) Hoffm.; Onoclea struthiopteris var. pubescens (Terry) Clute; Osmunda struthiopteris L.; Pteretis nodulosa f. pubescens (Terry) Fernald; Pteretis pensylvanica (Willd.) Fernald; Pteretis pensylvanica f. pubescens (Terry) Fernald; Pteretis struthiopteris (L.) Nieuwl.; Pteretis struthiopteris subvar. pubescens (Terry) Clute; Pterinodes struthiopteris (L.) Kuntze; Struthiopteris germanica f. pubescens Terry; Struthiopteris pensylvanica Willd.; Struthiopteris pensylvanica f. pubescens (Terry) Clute; Struthiopteris pubescens (Terry) Clute

= Matteuccia =

Species of fern in the family Onocleaceae

Matteuccia is a genus of ferns with one species: Matteuccia struthiopteris (common names ostrich fern, fiddlehead fern, or shuttlecock fern). The species epithet struthiopteris comes from Ancient Greek words στρουθίων (strouthíōn) "ostrich" and πτερίς (pterís) "fern".

== Description ==
The fronds are dimorphic, with the deciduous green sterile fronds being almost vertical, 100–170 cm (39–67 in) tall and 20–35 cm (7.9–13.8 in) broad, long-tapering to the base but short-tapering to the tip, so that they resemble ostrich plumes, hence the name. The fertile fronds are shorter, 40–65 cm (16–26 in) long, brown when ripe, with highly modified and constricted leaf tissue curled over the sporangia; they develop in autumn, persist erect over the winter and release the spores in early spring. Along with Dryopteris goldieana, it is one of the largest species of fern in eastern North America.

== Classification ==
Matteuccia struthiopteris is the only species in the genus Matteuccia. Some sources include two Asian species, M. orientalis and M. intermedia, but molecular data shows that M. struthiopteris is more closely related to Onocleopsis and Onoclea (sensitive fern) than it is to M. orientalis and M. intermedia, and so the latter should be moved to a genus Pentarhizidium which contains those two species. Formerly classified as a member of the Dryopteridaceae, Matteuccia has been reassigned to the new much smaller family Onocleaceae.

== Distribution ==
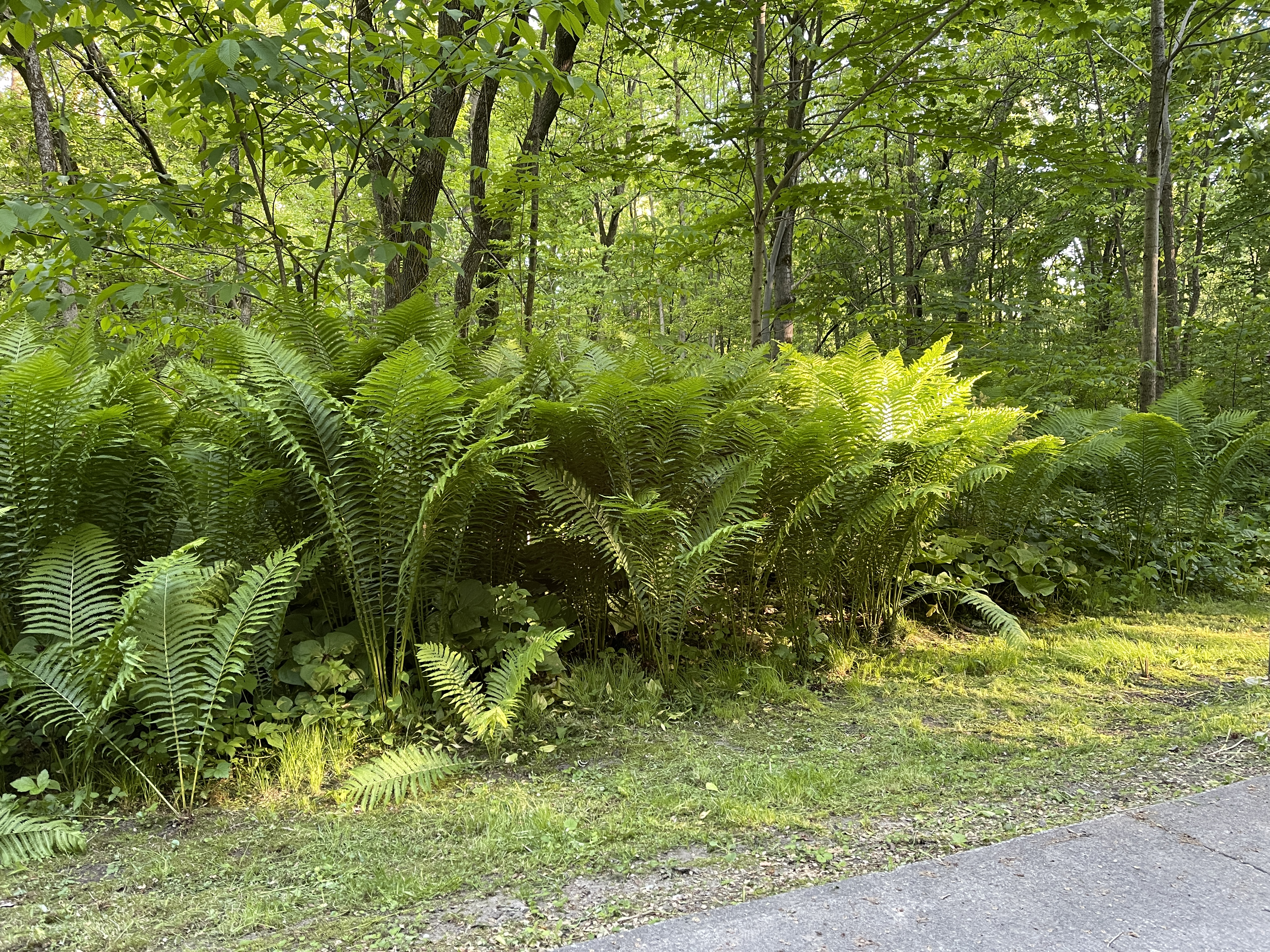
Matteuccia struthiopteris (L.) Todaro, Sainte-Anne-de-la-Pérade, Quebec, Canada

It is a crown-forming, colony-forming plant, occurring in temperate regions of the Northern Hemisphere in central and northern Europe, northern Asia, and northern North America. It grows from a completely vertical crown, favoring riverbanks and sandbars, but sends out lateral stolons to form new crowns. It can thus form dense colonies resistant to destruction by floodwaters.

== Cultivation and uses ==
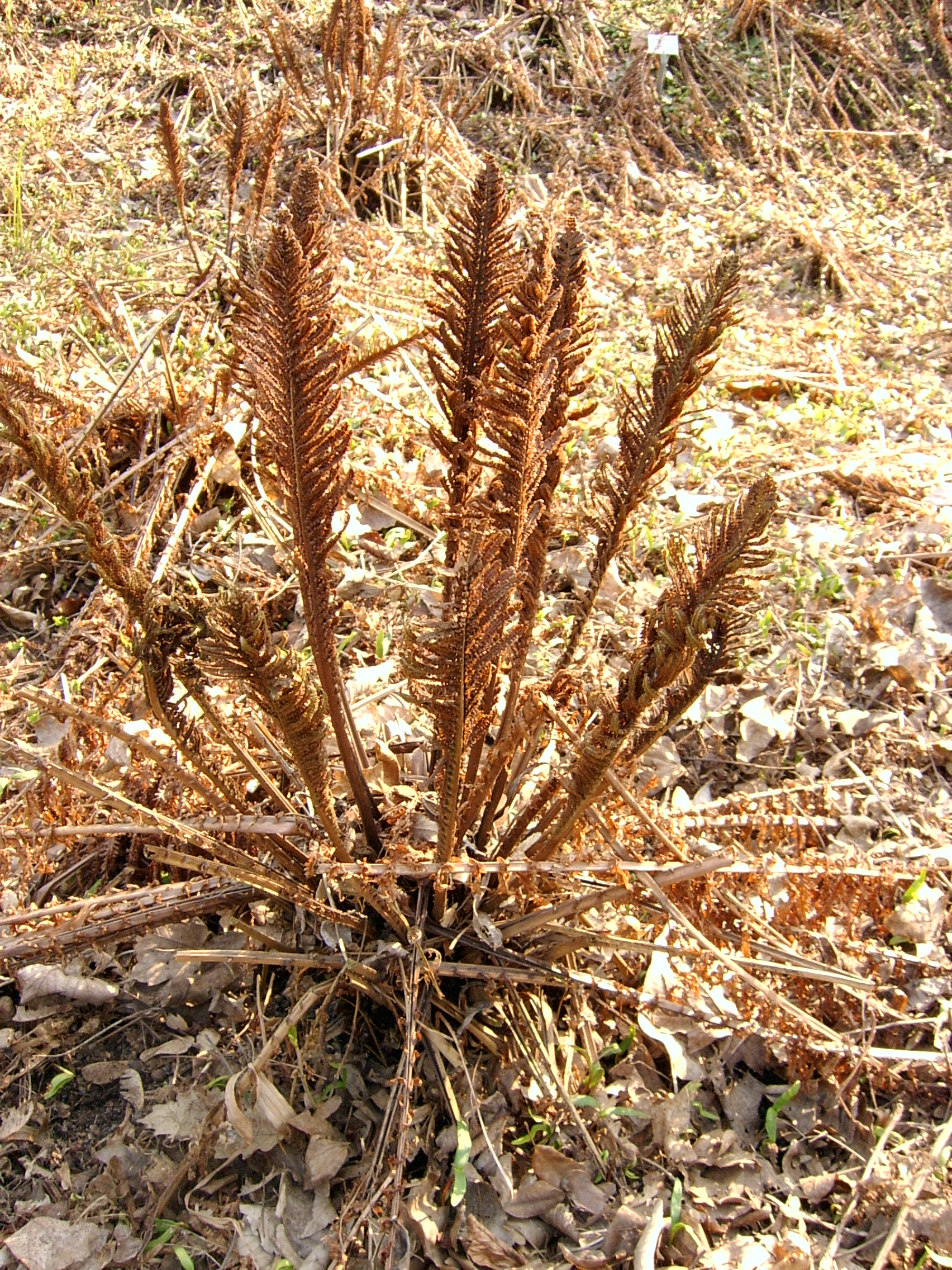
Spore-bearing fertile fronds in early spring

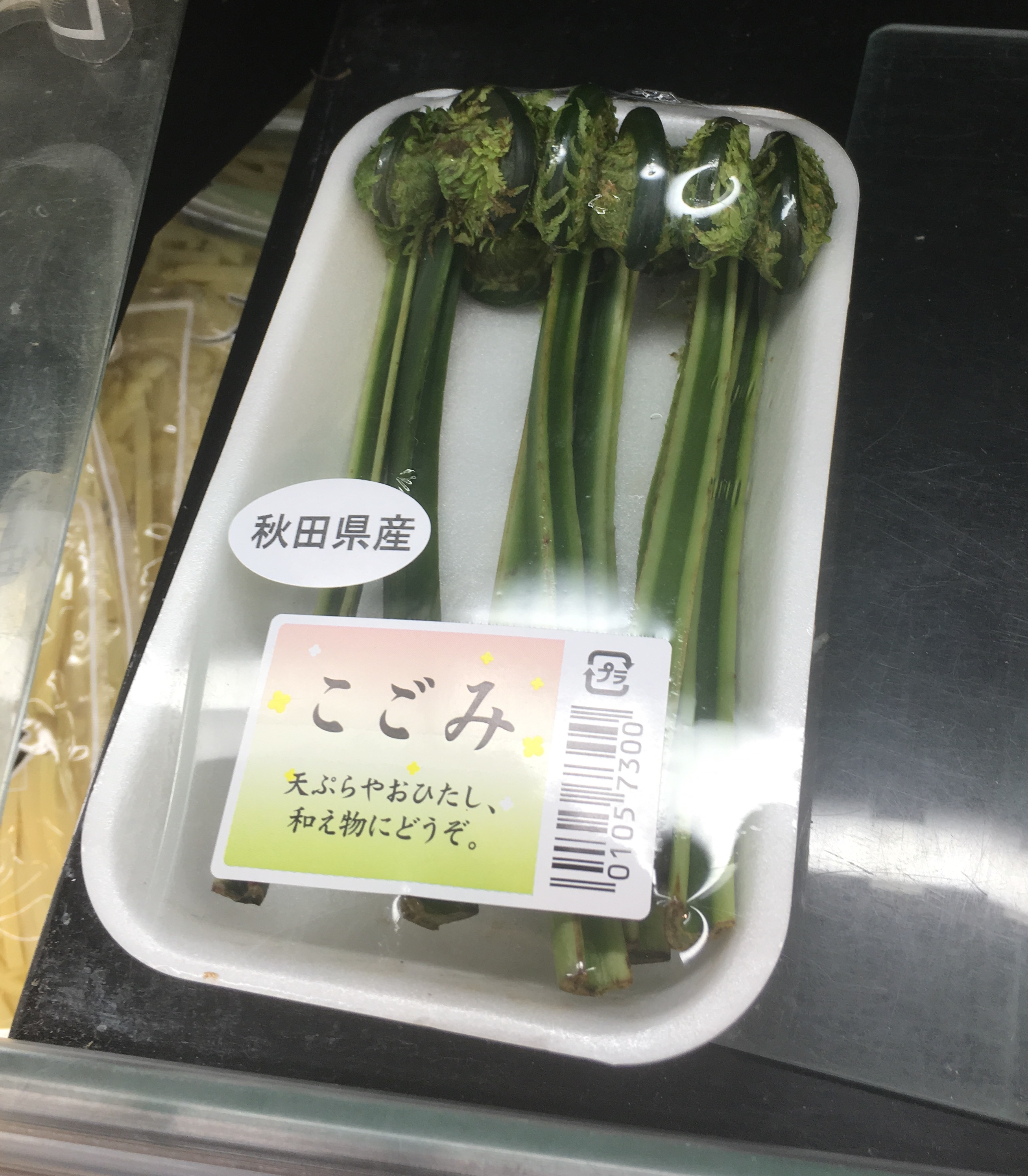
Fiddlehead sprouts for sale in Japan

The ostrich fern is a popular ornamental plant in gardens. It has gained the Royal Horticultural Society's Award of Garden Merit. While choosing a place of planting it should be taken into account that this fern is very expansive and its leaves often lose their beauty throughout the summer, especially if not protected from wind and hail.

The tightly wound immature fronds, called fiddleheads, are also used as a cooked vegetable, and are considered a delicacy mainly in rural areas of northeastern North America. It is considered inadvisable to eat uncooked fiddleheads. Brown "scales" are inedible and should be scraped or rinsed off.

The sprouts are also picked all over Japan, ("kogomi" in Japanese) as well as in other Asian regions, where they are considered a delicacy.

Additionally, in Norway, fiddleheads were apparently used in the manufacture of beer, and in Russia, in the control of gut parasites.

Matteuccia species are used as food plants by the larvae of some Lepidoptera species including Sthenopis pretiosus.

== Fungal host ==
Its base hosts the mushroom Woldmaria filiformis, which is uniquely linked with this species of fern.

== Sources ==
Media related to Matteuccia struthiopteris at Wikimedia Commons

- Hyde, H. A., Wade, A. E., & Harrison, S. G. (1978). Welsh Ferns. National Museum of Wales.
