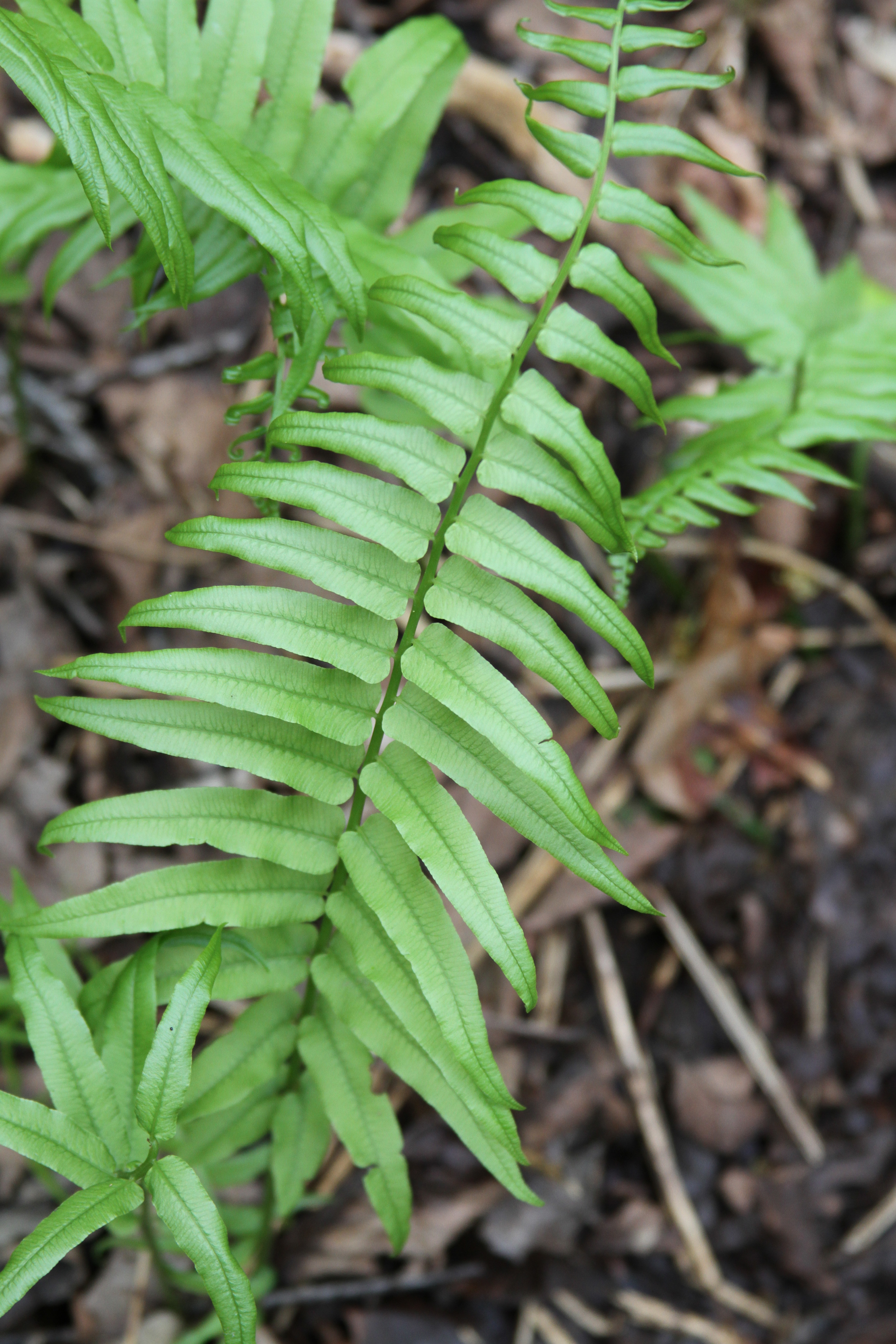
- Homalosorus pycnocarpos

Scientific classification
- Kingdom: Plantae
- Clade: Tracheophytes
- Division: Polypodiophyta
- Class: Polypodiopsida
- Order: Polypodiales
- Suborder: Aspleniineae
- Family: Diplaziopsidaceae; X.C.Zhang & Christenh.

Genera
- Diplaziopsis; Homalosorus

Synonyms
- Diplaziopsidoideae Christenh.

= Diplaziopsidaceae =

Family of ferns

Diplaziopsidaceae is a family of ferns in the order Polypodiales. In the Pteridophyte Phylogeny Group classification of 2016 (PPG I), the family is placed in the suborder Aspleniineae, and includes two genera. Alternatively, it may be treated as the subfamily Diplaziopsidoideae of a broadly defined family Aspleniaceae.

They are described as medium-to-large ferns, which grow near streams in forested areas. Their rhizomes are thick and decumbent to erect. Species are found in east Asia, from China south to New Guinea and east into the Pacific.

== Taxonomy ==
Maarten J. M. Christenhusz and Xuan-Chun Zhang originally described the family in 2011 by including three genera Diplaziopsis, Hemidictyum, and Homalosorus. Later that year Samuli Lehtonen found Hemidictyum to be a sister to Aspleniaceae, so Hemidictyum was placed in its own family, Hemidictyaceae. Christenhusz and Mark W. Chase later included Hemidictyum in their subfamily Asplenioideae rather than their subfamily Diplaziopsidoideae.

=== Genera ===
Two genera are accepted in the PPG I classification, and by the Checklist of Ferns and Lycophytes of the World as of November 2019:

- Diplaziopsis C.Chr. – three species
- Homalosorus Small ex Pic. Serm. – one species

=== Phylogenetic relationships ===
The following cladogram for the suborder Aspleniineae (as eupolypods II), based on Lehtonen, 2011, and Rothfels & al., 2012, shows a likely phylogenetic relationship between the Diplaziopsidaceae and the other families of the clade.

- Aspleniineae (eupolypods II)
  - Cystopteridaceae
  - - - Rhachidosoraceae
      - - Diplaziopsidaceae
        - - Aspleniaceae
          - Hemidictyaceae
    - - Thelypteridaceae
      - - Woodsiaceae
        - - - Onocleaceae
            - Blechnaceae
          - Athyriaceae
