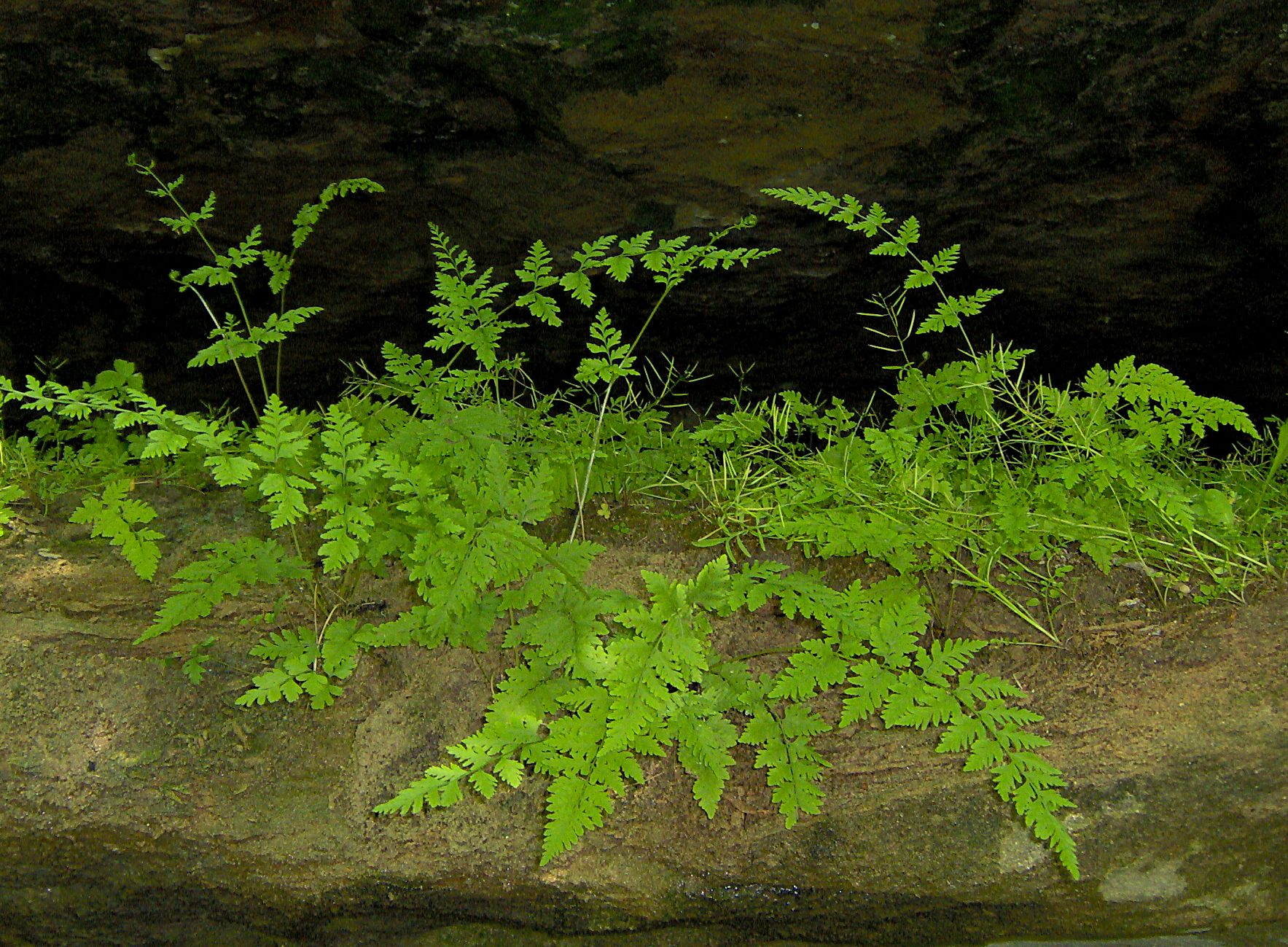

Scientific classification
- Kingdom: Plantae
- Clade: Tracheophytes
- Division: Polypodiophyta
- Class: Polypodiopsida
- Order: Polypodiales
- Suborder: Aspleniineae
- Family: Cystopteridaceae (Payer) Shmakov

Genera
- Acystopteris; ×Cystocarpium; Cystopteris; Gymnocarpium

Synonyms
- Cystopteridoideae Ching & Z.R.Wang

= Cystopteridaceae =

Family of ferns

Cystopteridaceae is a family of ferns in the order Polypodiales. In the Pteridophyte Phylogeny Group classification of 2016 (PPG I), the family is placed in the suborder Aspleniineae of the order Polypodiales, and includes three genera. Alternatively, it may be treated as the subfamily Cystopteridoideae of a very broadly defined family Aspleniaceae.

Cystopteridaceae are small or medium-sized ferns in forests and crevices. They generally have thin laminae, and small, round, naked sori.

== Genera ==
Three genera are accepted in the PPG I classification, and by the Checklist of Ferns and Lycophytes of the World as of August 2022. One hybrid genus also exists:

- Acystopteris Nakai
- Cystopteris Bernh.
- Gymnocarpium Newman
- ×Cystocarpium Fraser-Jenk.

Cystopteris chinensis has been placed in a separate genus, Cystoathyrium, but the genus is not accepted by recent sources.

== Phylogenetic relationships ==
Gymnocarpium and Cystopteris have been found to be sister to the remaining Aspleniineae.

External phylogeny

- Aspleniineae (eupolypods II)
  - Cystopteridaceae
  - - - Rhachidosoraceae
      - - Diplaziopsidaceae
        - - Aspleniaceae
          - Hemidictyaceae
    - - Thelypteridaceae
      - - Woodsiaceae
        - - - Onocleaceae
            - Blechnaceae
          - Athyriaceae

Internal phylogeny

- - Gymnocarpium
  - - Acystopteris
    - Cystopteris
