= Hemidictyum =

Scientific classification
- Kingdom: Plantae
- Clade: Tracheophytes
- Division: Polypodiophyta
- Class: Polypodiopsida
- Order: Polypodiales
- Suborder: Aspleniineae
- Family: Hemidictyaceae; Christenh. & H.Schneid.
- Genus: Hemidictyum; C.Presl
- Species: H. marginatum

Binomial name
- Hemidictyum marginatum (L.) C.Presl

Synonyms
- Allantodia marginata Racib.; Asplenium limbatum Willd.; Asplenium marginatum L.; Asplenium mikanii C.Presl; Athyrium marginatum Milde; Diplazium giganteum Karst.; Diplazium limbatum (Willd.) Proctor; Diplazium marginatum Diels; Hemidictyum limbatum (Willd.) C.Presl; Hemidictyum peruvianum C.Presl

Genus of ferns

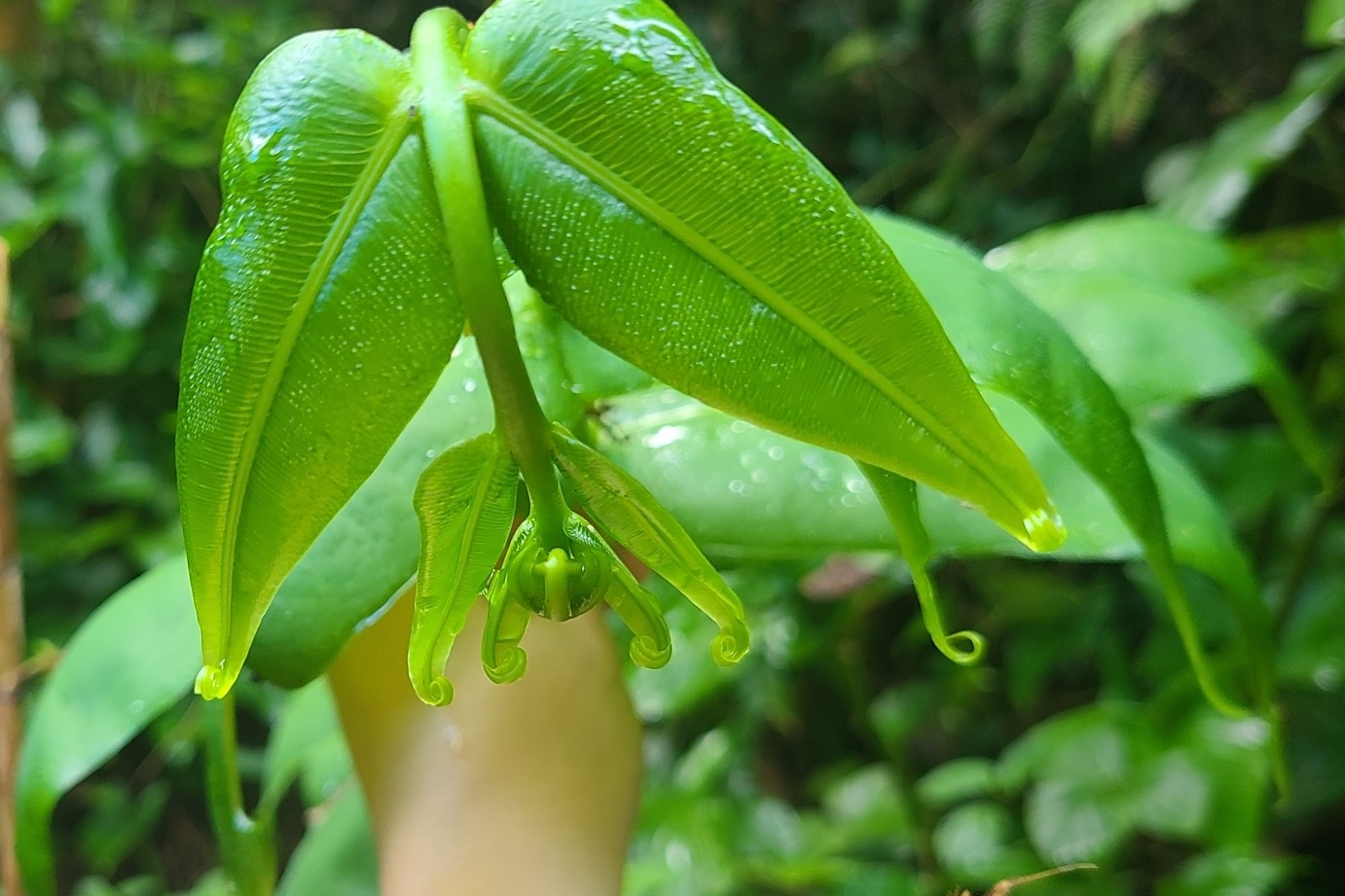
Hemidictyum marginatum plant

Hemidictyum is a genus of ferns with a single species, Hemidictyum marginatum, commonly known as the marginated half net fern. In the Pteridophyte Phylogeny Group classification of 2016 (PPG I), it is the only genus in the family Hemidictyaceae. Alternatively, the family, along with Aspleniaceae sensu stricto, may be placed in a much more broadly defined family Aspleniaceae as the subfamily Asplenioideae.

== Taxonomy ==
The name Hemidictyum was derived from the terms hemi (half) and diktyon (net), from the veins being netted only half-way across the pinnules.

=== Phylogenetic relationships ===
Hemidictyaceae is considered to be a sister family to Aspleniaceae s.l., believed to have diverged during the Cretaceous period. The following cladogram for the suborder Aspleniineae (as eupolypods II), based on Lehtonen (2011), and Rothfels & al. (2012), shows a likely phylogenetic relationship between the Hemidictyaceae and the other families of the clade.

- Aspleniineae (eupolypods II)
  - Cystopteridaceae
  - - - Rhachidosoraceae
      - - Diplaziopsidaceae
        - - Aspleniaceae
          - Hemidictyaceae
    - - Thelypteridaceae
      - - Woodsiaceae
        - - - Onocleaceae
            - Blechnaceae
          - Athyriaceae

=== Species ===
There is currently only one accepted Hemidictyum species, Hemidictyum marginatum.

== Distribution ==
Hemidictyum is a native neotropical fern, found in Mexico, the Caribbean, Costa Rica, Guatemala, Honduras, Nicaragua, Panama, French Guiana, Suriname, Brazil, Venezuela, Puerto Rico, Bolivia, Colombia, Ecuador, and Peru.
