= Emily Hitchcock Terry =

American botanist and illustrator

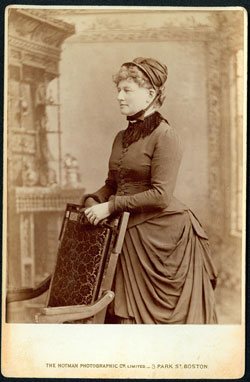
Emily Hitchcock Terry circa 1900

Emily Hitchcock Terry (November 9, 1838 - February 6, 1921) was an American botanist and illustrator.

== Early life and education ==
Terry was the daughter of Orra White Hitchcock and Edward Hitchcock, the youngest of their children. She was an early graduate of Mount Holyoke College. She studied art at The Cooper Union in New York City. She began her formal study of art at The Cooper Union in New York City in 1865. In 1872, Terry moved to Minnesota where she created a painted herbarium instead of creating herbarium of pressed specimens. Her watercolor images of the Minnesota flora are the earliest known botanical illustrations in the state.

A Painted Herbarium: The Life and Art of Emily Hitchcock Terry (1838-1921) is a book by Beatrice Scheer Smith that chronicles the life and botanical illustrations of Emily Hitchcock Terry.
