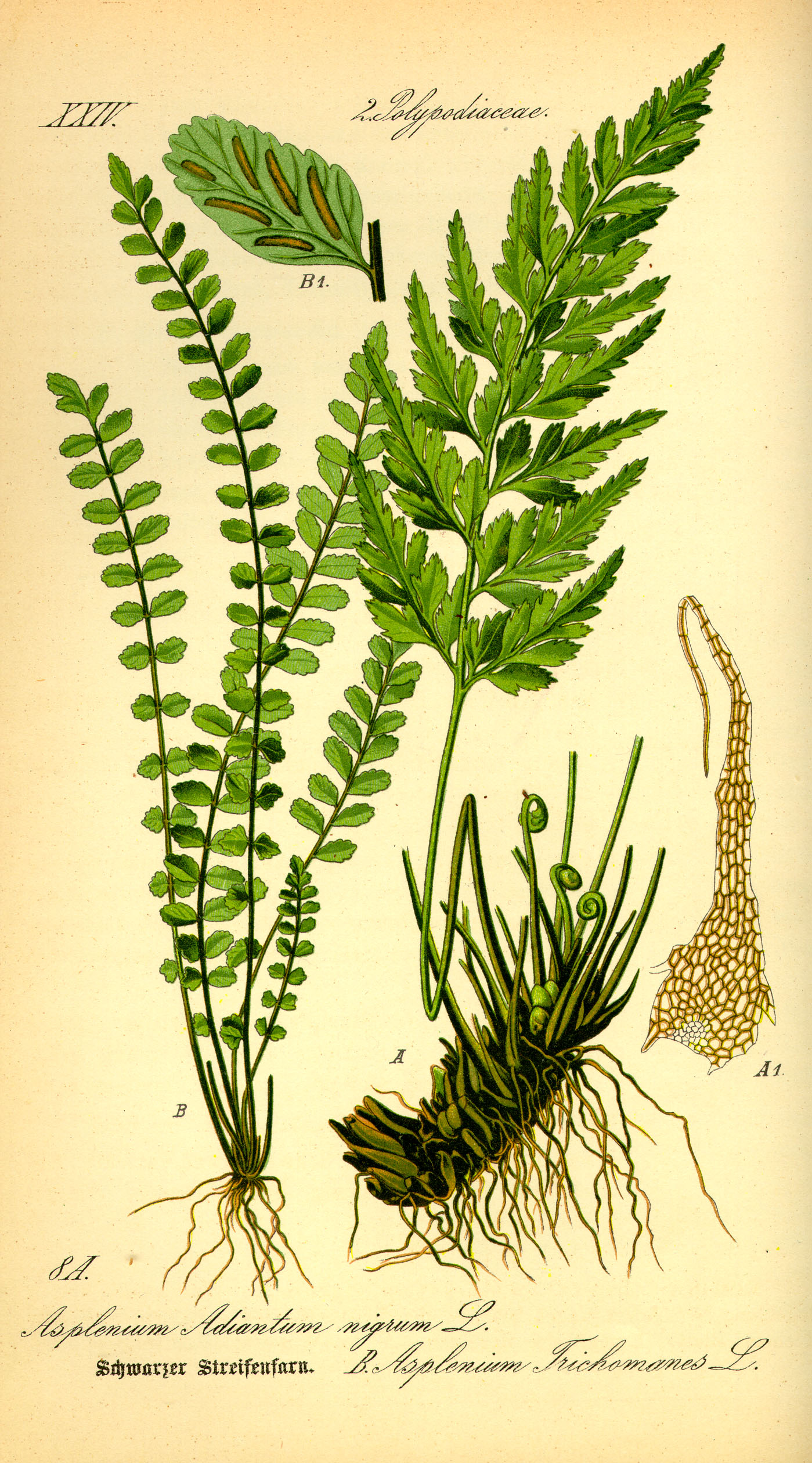

Scientific classification
- Kingdom: Plantae
- Clade: Tracheophytes
- Division: Polypodiophyta
- Class: Polypodiopsida
- Order: Polypodiales
- Suborder: Aspleniineae
- Family: Aspleniaceae; Newm.

Type genus
- Asplenium L.

Genera
- Asplenium; Hymenasplenium

Synonyms
- Asplenieae Gaudichaud-Beaupré 1828; Aspleniinae Dumortier 1829; Asplenioideae Link 1841; Scolopendrieae Hooker 1844

= Aspleniaceae =

Aspleniaceae Temporal range: Kimmeridgian–Recent

Family of ferns

The Aspleniaceae (spleenworts) are a family of ferns, included in the order Polypodiales. The composition and classification of the family have been subject to considerable changes. In particular, there is a narrow circumscription, Aspleniaceae s.s. (adopted here), in which the family contains only two genera, and a very broad one, Aspleniaceae s.l., in which the family includes 10 other families kept separate in the narrow circumscription, with the Aspleniaceae s.s. being reduced to the subfamily Asplenioideae. The family has a worldwide distribution, with many species in both temperate and tropical areas. Elongated unpaired sori are an important characteristic of most members of the family.

== Description ==
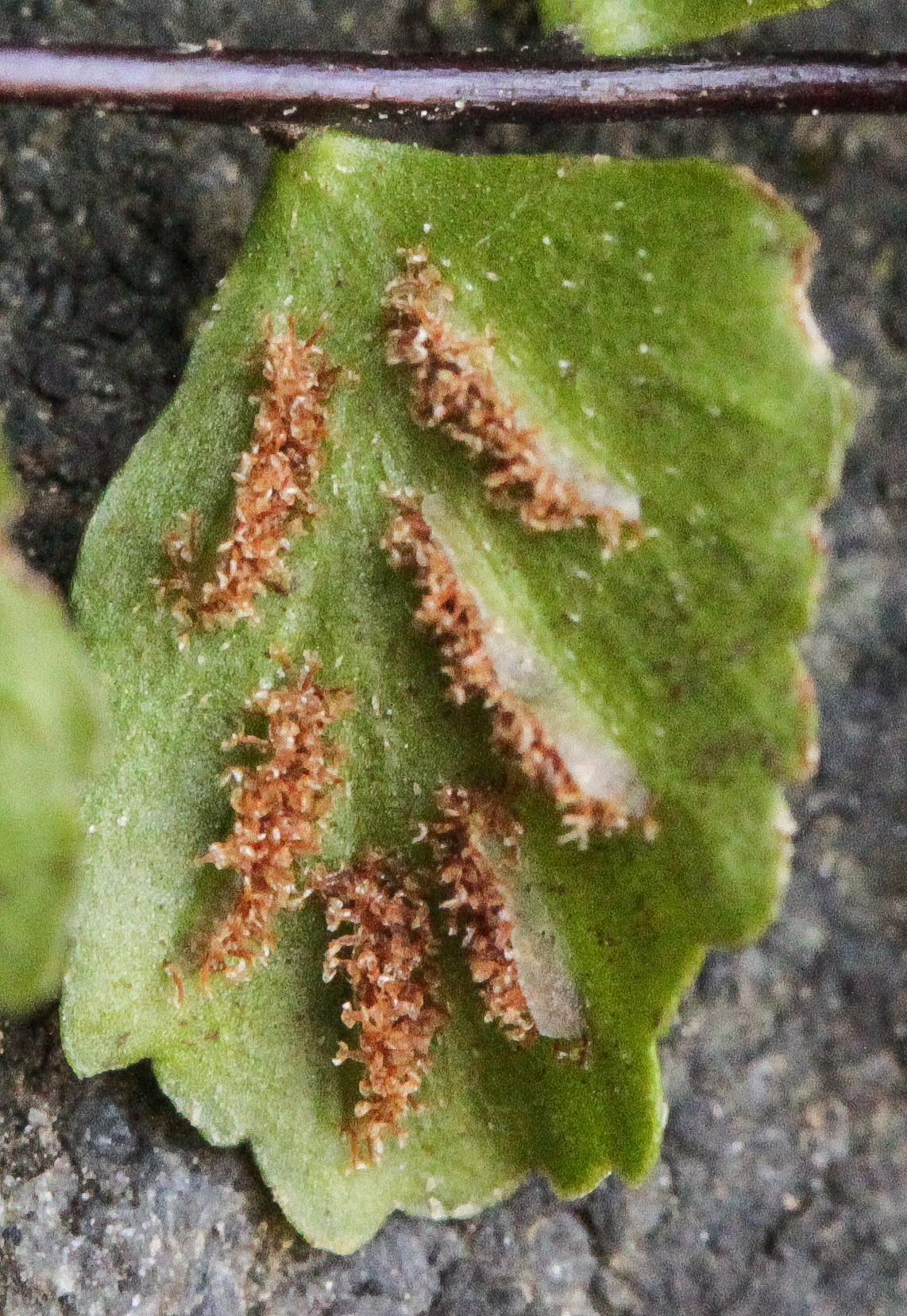
Sori of Asplenium trichomanes, showing linear arrangement with a thin membranous indusium along one edge

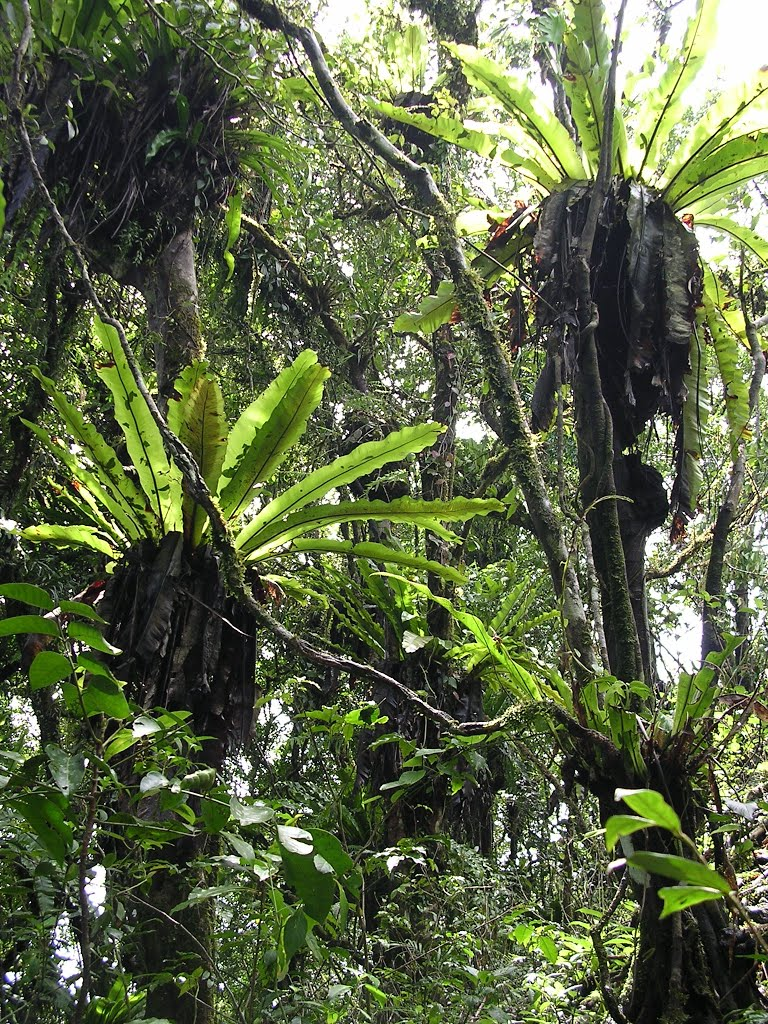
Asplenium nidus in habitat: an epiphyte with undivided leaves

Members of the family grow from rhizomes, that are either creeping or somewhat erect, and are usually but not always unbranched, and have scales that usually have a lattice-like (clathrate) structure. In some species, for example Asplenium nidus, the rhizomes form a kind of basket which collects detritus. The leaves may be undivided or be divided, with up to four-fold pinnation. The sori are characteristic of the family. They are elongated, and normally located on one side of a vein. More rarely, they may be in pairs on a single vein, but then they never curve over the vein. A flap-like indusium arises along one edge of a sorus. The leaf stalks (petioles) have two vascular bundles, uniting to form an X-shape in cross-section towards the tip of the leaf. The stalks of the sporangia are one cell wide in the middle.

== Taxonomy ==
The family Aspleniaceae was first described by Edward Newman in 1840. Newman included three genera: Athyrium, Asplenium and Scolopendrium. Athyrium is now placed in a different family, Athyriaceae, not considered very strongly related to the Aspleniaceae, and Scolopendrium is regarded as synonym of Asplenium.

The narrow circumscription of the family adopted by the Pteridophyte Phylogeny Group classification of 2016 (PPG I) recognizes only two genera, Asplenium and Hymenasplenium. Asplenium has previously been split into a dozen or so genera, including Diella, found only in Hawaii. The consensus of molecular phylogenetic studies is that all are nested within Asplenium. PPG I places Aspleniaceae in the suborder Aspleniineae of the order Polypodiales.

Earlier, Christenhusz and Chase had proposed a much broader circumscription of Aspleniaceae, in which it consisted of all the separate families that PPG I places in the suborder Aspleniineae (eight at the time), with the families reduced to subfamilies. Thus the Aspleniaceae of PPG I became the subfamily Asplenioideae. As of July 2019, the broader circumscription of the Aspleniaceae is used by Plants of the World Online, which lists 24 genera.

=== Phylogenic relationships ===
Aspleniaceae is placed in a clade known as eupolypods II, or more formally as suborder Aspleniineae. The following cladogram, based on Lehtonen (2011) and Rothfels & al. (2012), shows a likely phylogenic relationship between the Aspleniaceae and the other families in the clade.

- Aspleniineae (eupolypods II)
  - Cystopteridaceae
  - - - Rhachidosoraceae
      - - Diplaziopsidaceae
        - - Aspleniaceae
          - Hemidictyaceae
    - - Thelypteridaceae
      - - Woodsiaceae
        - - - Onocleaceae
            - Blechnaceae
          - Athyriaceae

=== Genera ===
In the PPG I system, Aspleniaceae s.s. contains two genera:

- Asplenium L. – about 700 species, worldwide
- Hymenasplenium Hayata – about 40 species, tropical and subtropical

== Distribution and habitat ==
The Aspleniaceae have a worldwide distribution, with the large genus Asplenium being native to almost all parts of the world except Antarctica and some high Arctic areas. The family is unusual in having high diversity in both temperate and tropical areas, and more-or-less equal numbers of terrestrial and epiphytic species. Plants are terrestrial, growing in the ground, lithophytic, growing on rocks, or epiphytic, growing on other plants; less often they are aquatic, growing in moving water.

== Bibliography ==
- Germplasm Resources Information Network: Aspleniaceae
- Murakami, N.; Nogami, S.; Watanabe, M.; Iwatsuki, K. (1999). "Phylogeny of Aspleniaceae inferred from rbcL nucleotide sequences". American Fern Journal. 89 (4): 232–243. Bibcode:1999AmFJ...89..232M. doi:10.2307/1547233. JSTOR 1547233.
- See photos of Aspleniaceae
