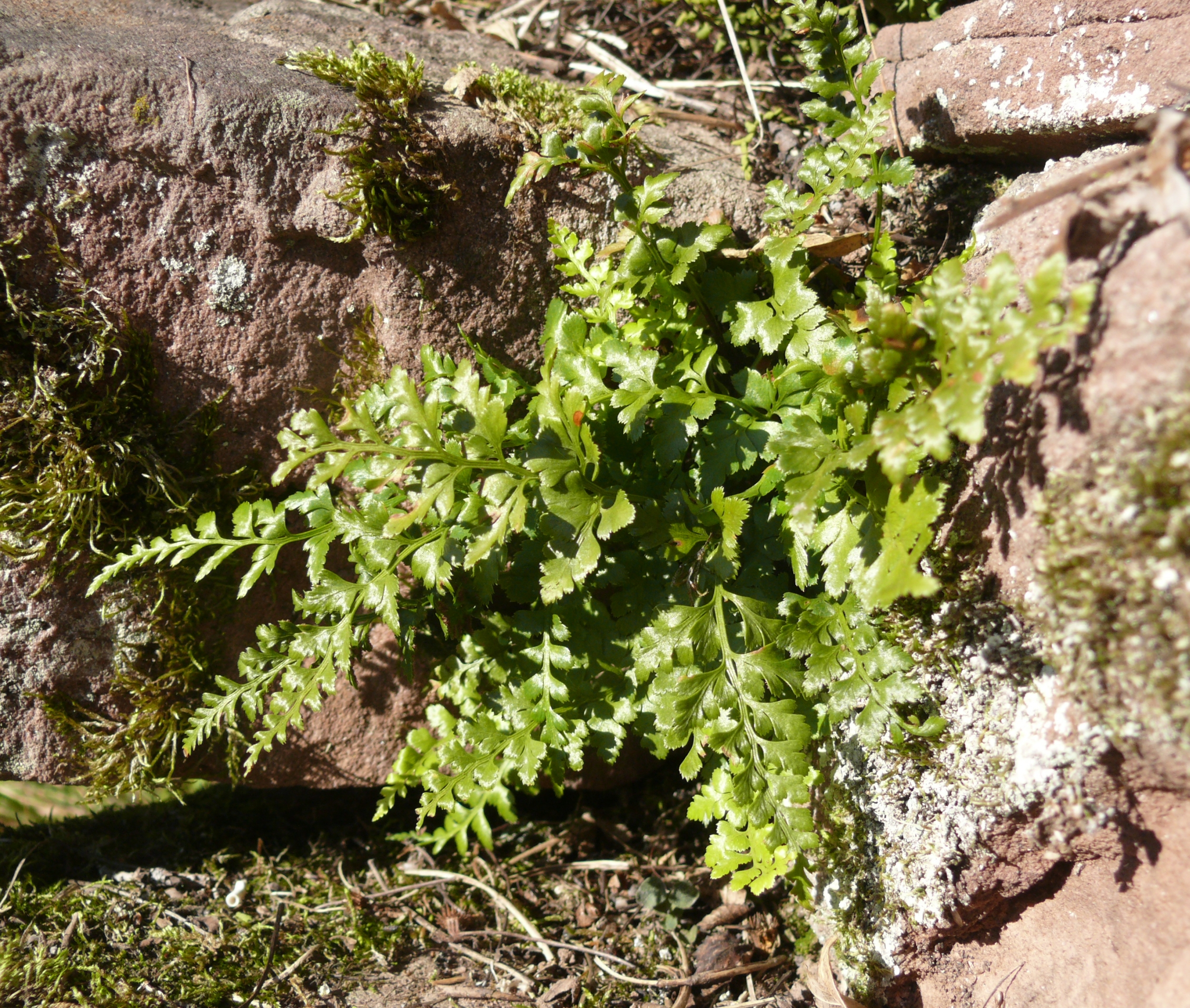
- Asplenium adiantum-nigrum, the black spleenwort

Scientific classification
- Kingdom: Plantae
- Clade: Tracheophytes
- Division: Polypodiophyta
- Class: Polypodiopsida
- Order: Polypodiales
- Suborder: Aspleniineae; H.Schneid. & C.J.Rothf.

Families
- Aspleniaceae Newman; Athyriaceae Alston; Blechnaceae Newman; Cystopteridaceae Shmakov; Desmophlebiaceae Mynssen; Diplaziopsidaceae X.C.Zhang & Christenh.; Hemidictyaceae Christenh. & H.Schneid.; Onocleaceae Pic.Serm.; Rhachidosoraceae X.C.Zhang; Thelypteridaceae Ching ex Pic.Serm.; Woodsiaceae Herter

Synonyms
- Blechnales Pic.Serm. ex Reveal

= Aspleniineae =

Aspleniineae Temporal range: Kimmeridgian–Recent

Suborder of ferns

Aspleniineae is a suborder of ferns in the order Polypodiales. It is equivalent to the clade eupolypods II in earlier systems; it is also treated as a single very broadly defined family Aspleniaceae. The suborder generally corresponds with the order Blechnales as described by J. L. Reveal in 1993. Aspleniineae includes some important ferns, including Onoclea sensibilis, the sensitive fern, which grows abundantly throughout much of temperate North America, and ferns of the genus Thelypteris, a genus that has shown considerable speciation. It also includes one of the more common horticultural ferns, Matteuccia struthiopteris, the ostrich fern.

== Taxonomy ==
In the Pteridophyte Phylogeny Group classification of 2016 (PPG I), the group is treated as the suborder Aspleniinae, and divided into 11 families. Alternatively, it may be treated as a single, very broadly circumscribed family Aspleniaceae sensu lato, which is then divided into subfamilies. The relationship between the two approaches is shown in the table below.

PPG I	Christenhusz & Chase (2014)
Suborder Aspleniineae H.Schneid. & C.J.Rothf	Family Aspleniaceae Newman
Family Cystopteridaceae Shmakov	Subfamily Cystopteridoideae Ching & Z.R.Wang
Family Rhachidosoraceae X.C.Zhang	Subfamily Rhachidosoroideae M.L.Wang & Y.T.Hsieh
Family Diplaziopsidaceae X.C.Zhang & Christenh.	Subfamily Diplaziopsidoideae Christenh.
Family Desmophlebiaceae Mynssen	(The only genus was described after 2014.)
Family Hemidictyaceae Christenh. & H.Schneid.	Subfamily Asplenioideae Link
Family Aspleniaceae Newman	Subfamily Asplenioideae Link
Family Woodsiaceae Herter	Subfamily Woodsioideae Schmakov
Family Onocleaceae Pic.Serm.	Subfamily Blechnoideae Hook.
Family Blechnaceae Newman	Subfamily Blechnoideae Hook.
Family Athyriaceae Alston	Subfamily Athyrioideae B.K.Nayar
Family Thelypteridaceae Ching ex Pic.Serm.	Subfamily Thelypteridoideae C.F.Reed

=== Phylogenic relationships ===
The following diagram shows a likely phylogenic relationship between the families of Aspleniineae (as eupolypods II), based on Lehtonen (2011), and Rothfels & al. (2012).

- Aspleniineae (eupolypods II)
  - Cystopteridaceae
  - - - Rhachidosoraceae
      - - Diplaziopsidaceae
        - - Aspleniaceae
          - Hemidictyaceae
    - - Thelypteridaceae
      - - Woodsiaceae
        - - - Onocleaceae
            - Blechnaceae
          - Athyriaceae
