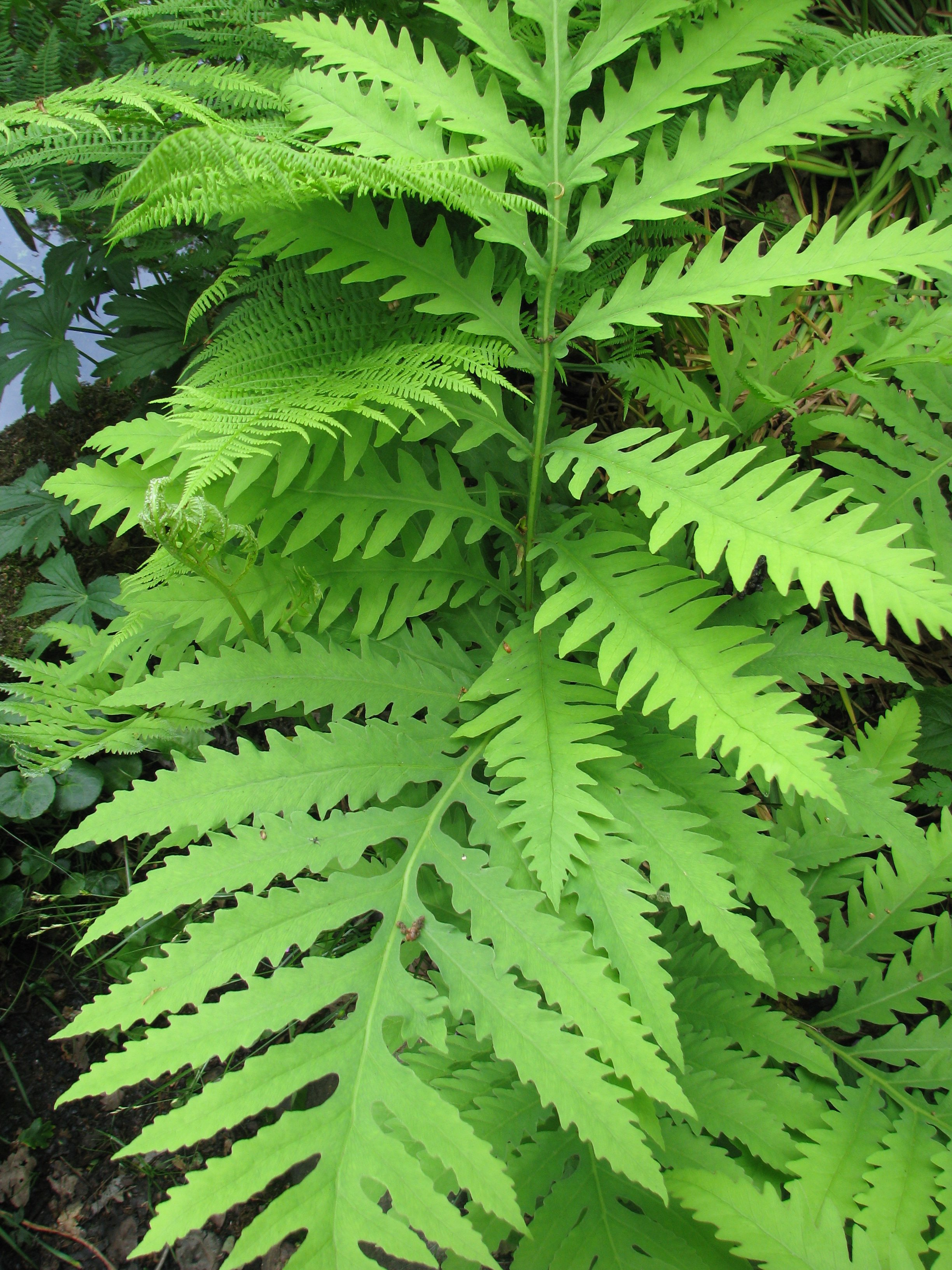

Conservation status
- Secure (NatureServe)

Scientific classification
- Kingdom: Plantae
- Clade: Tracheophytes
- Division: Polypodiophyta
- Class: Polypodiopsida
- Order: Polypodiales
- Suborder: Aspleniineae
- Family: Onocleaceae
- Genus: Onoclea
- Species: O. sensibilis

Binomial name
- Onoclea sensibilis L.

= Onoclea sensibilis =

Species of fern

Onoclea sensibilis, the sensitive fern, also known as the bead fern, is a coarse-textured, medium to large-sized deciduous perennial fern. The name comes from its sensitivity to frost, the fronds dying quickly when first touched by it. It is sometimes treated as the only species in Onoclea, but some authors do not consider the genus monotypic.

== Description ==
The sterile and fertile fronds of Onoclea sensibilis have independent stalks originating from the same rhizome, quite different from other ferns. The bright, yellow-green trophophylls (sterile fronds) are deeply pinnatifid and are typically borne at intervals along the creeping rhizome. The sterile fronds are deciduous with trophopods, swollen bases, that serve as over winter storage organs. The sterile fronds of O. var. sensibilis have a length of 1–1.3 m (3.3–4.3 ft) with 5–11 pinnae, leaf pairs, evenly spaced along the stipe. O. var. interrupta Maxim. fronds are shorter, 20–50 cm (7.9–19.7 in) long, with fewer pinnae, only 5–8 pairs.

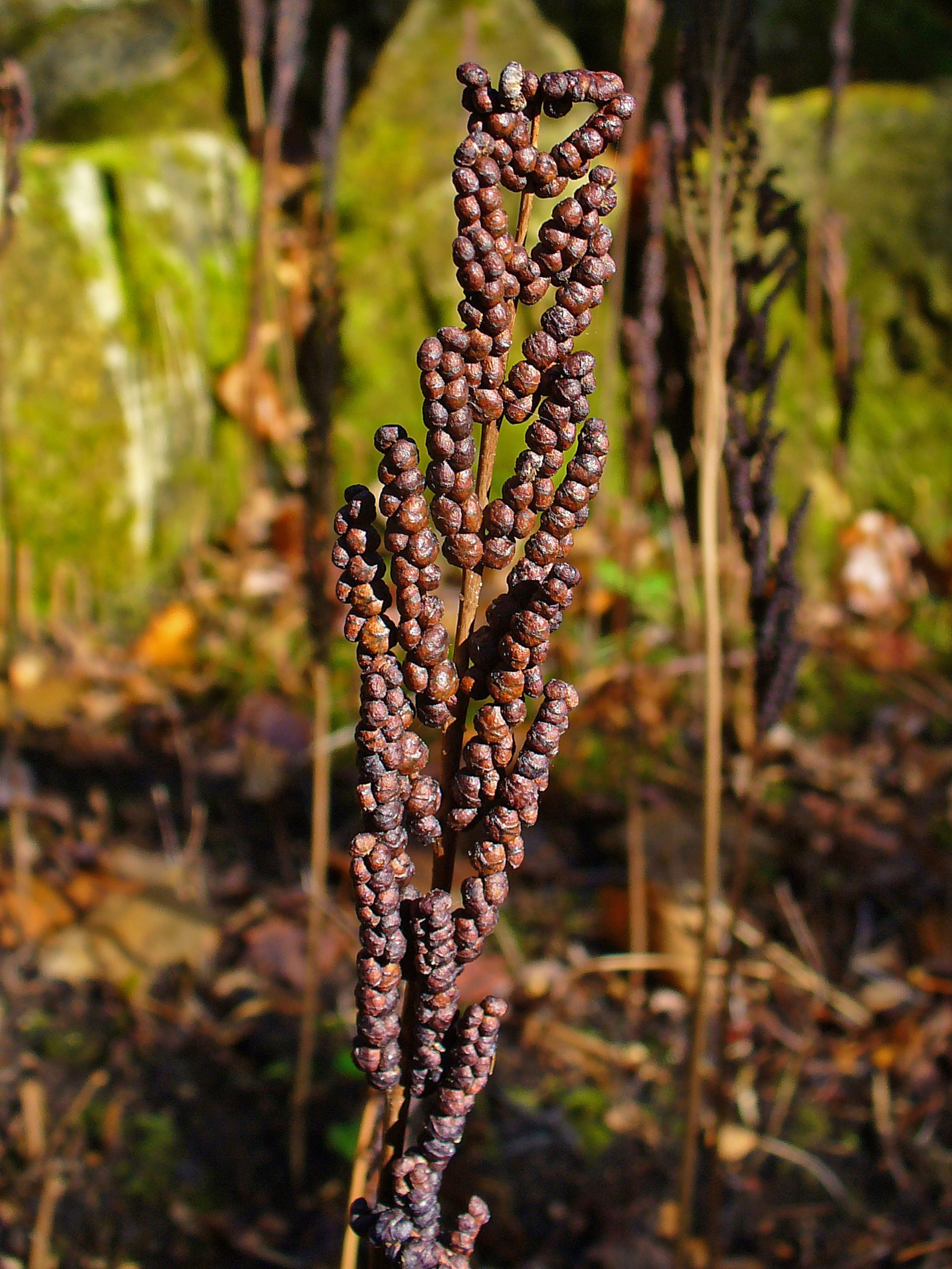
Sporophyte "Beads"

The sporophylls (fertile fronds) are smaller, 20–45 cm (7.9–17.7 in) in length, non-green at maturity and have very narrow pinnae. They are persistent, standing 2–3 years. The sori comprise clusters of sporangia (spore cases) 2–4 mm (1/10–1/6 in) in diameter, like beads, on upright fertile fronds, hence the common name Bead fern.

Sori are typically bilaterally symmetrical, though leaf forms have been observed with pinnae fertile only on a single side of the rachis. This form, named O. sensibilis L. F. hemiphyllodes (Kiss & Kümmerle, 1926) and a second, O. sensibilis L. F. obtusilobata having flat pinnules (not curled or bead shaped), were deemed to be variations not meriting taxonomic recognition (J. M. Beitel et al. 1981).

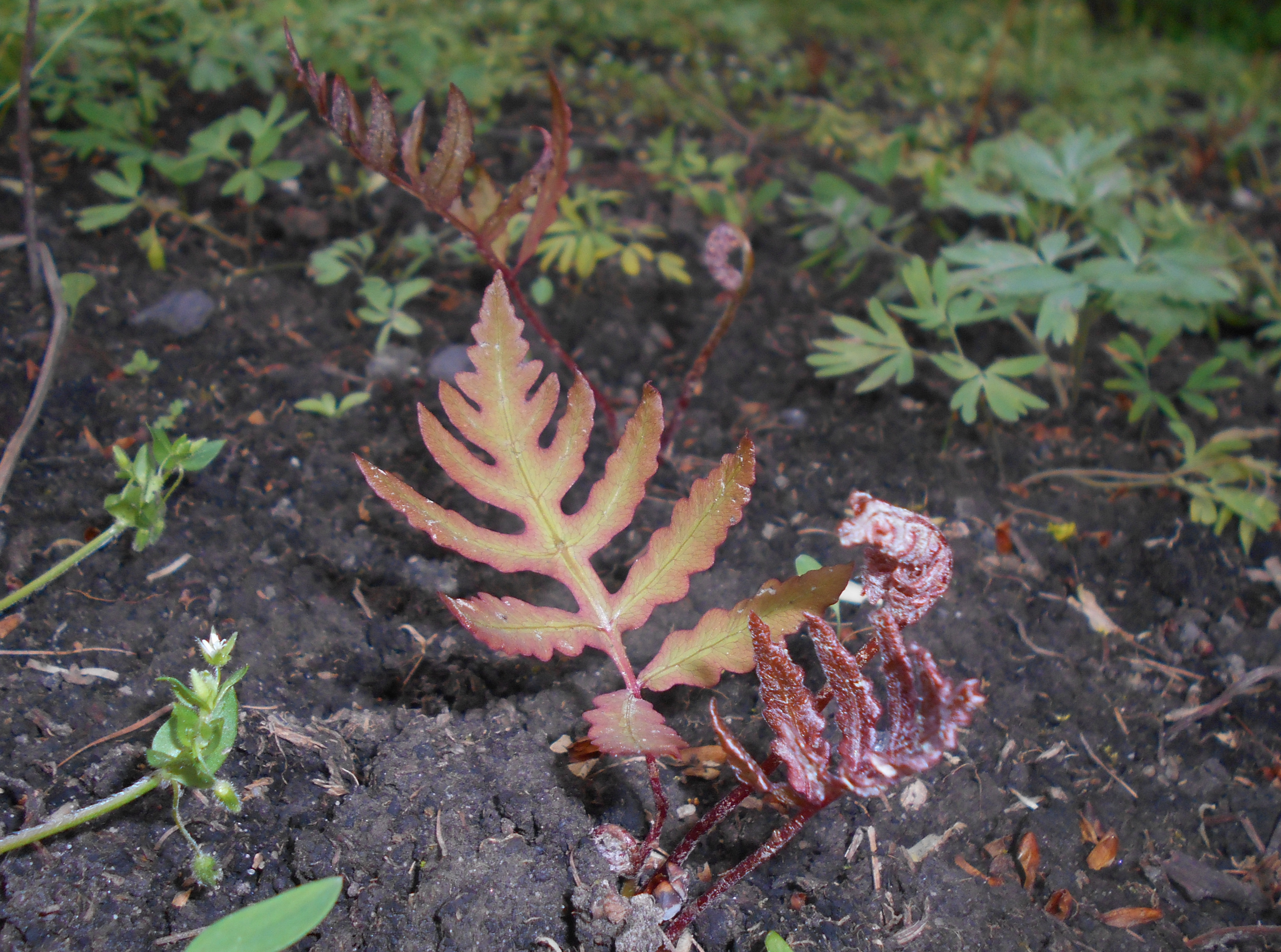
Onoclea sensibilis' fiddleheads and first fronds

The fiddleheads have a pale reddish color.

=== Morphology ===
The spermatogenesis process spans formation of spermatogenous cells to the release of spore. In homosporous ferns, like O. sensibilis L., developing spermatids are surrounded by two different walls at specific development stages, as opposed to a single wall reported in other species. Other differences include a delayed formation of the osmiophilic crest and during sperm release the cap cell removes intact, as opposed to forming a pore or collapsing altogether. Spores are monolete with the antheridium, or sporangium, containing either 32 or 64 sperm spores, usually being 64. Regardless of the number, the capsule's volume remains nearly the same.

The mechanics of spore release and its timing are controlled by springtime humidity. The small fertile margins, that in live-form held spore in tightly rolled structures, maintain their dry, leathery shape over winter. These pinnules respond to spring's higher humidity by opening, releasing their spore into the air. Subsequent gametophytes are unisexual in early development, favoring cross-fertilization, later becoming bisexual to ensure species survival.

== Taxonomy ==
=== Species ===
The genus Onoclea was cast by Carl Linnaeus in 1751, separating from the fern's prior association with the Angiopteris genus. The binominal name, Onoclea sensibilis, was published in his 1753 Species Plantarum.

=== Varieties ===
Onoclea sensibilis has two geographically disjunctive varieties. Onoclea sensibilis var. sensibilis is native to North America; Canada's central and eastern regions and the United States' north, central and eastern regions. Onoclea sensibilis var. interrupta Maximowicz (aka Maxim.) is native to Southeast Siberia, Japan and China. The varietal difference is their ultimate height, O. var. interrupta Maxim. only reaching half the height of its sister.

=== Alternate names ===
Regional colloquial names for Onoclea sensibilis, the sensitive fern, focus on its characteristics.

- bead fern, an alternate name based on its fertile beaded pinnae (leaflets)
- bolletjesvaren; Dutch, meaning "ball fern"
- druebregne; Danish, meaning "grape fern"
- dwa’hũdes gananitsga’kwaʼ; Cayuga, meaning "deer, what they lie on"
- harilik pärljalg; Estonian, meaning "common pearl leg"
- helmisaniainen; Finnish, meaning "mother of pearl"
- pärlbräken; Swedish, meaning "pearl bracts"
- unì·suwεkwaʼ; Onondaga, meaning "bait"

=== Etymology ===
Onoclea sensibilis' name was descriptive. Onoclea comes from the Greek onos, meaning a vessel, and kleio, meaning to close, describing the closely rolled sori on its fertile fronds. Its species, from the Late Latin sensibilis, means sensitive, describing its high sensitivity to autumn's first frost and to drought.

== Distribution and habitat ==
Onoclea sensibilis is native to Northern Hemisphere temperate regions; the Russian Far East, China and Eastern Asia, and a wide native distribution in Northern America. It ranges from Newfoundland south to Florida and west to Texas, the Rocky Mountains, North and South Dakota, Quebec, and Manitoba.

It has become naturalized in western Europe and New Zealand.

Onoclea sensibilis can be found at elevations from sea level up to 1,500 metres (4,900 ft) in fresh water habitats, not brackish, as its spore germination ceases at salt (NaCl) levels ≥ 0.6%, moderately saline water and higher.

Onoclea sensibilis grows best in moist shaded or partially shaded areas, dwelling in a variety of swamp and wood habitats: wet meadows, thickets and bogs, as well as stream and riverbanks and roadside ditches. It tolerates extremely wet soils, appearing in soggy ground or at the very edge of water in shade or sun. The plant can tolerate dryer conditions in shade.

It prefers acidic (pH <6.8), loose, sandy to loam, limestone-based soils.

== Ecology ==
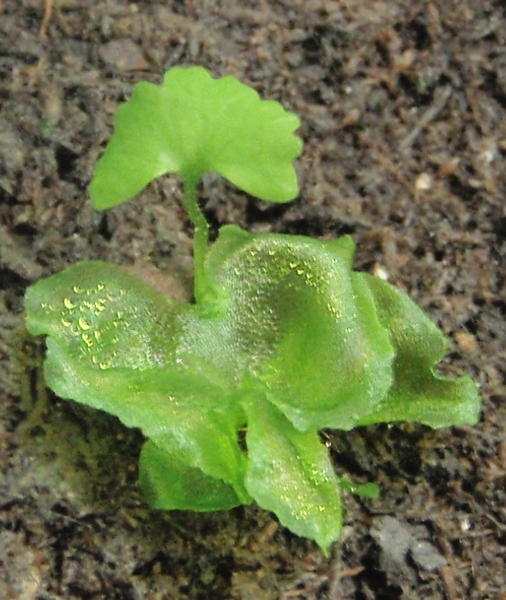
Gametophyte (the flat thallus at the bottom of the picture) with a descendant sporophyte beginning to grow from it (the small frond at the top of the picture)

The Onoclea sensibilis plant has remained essentially unchanged over millions of years. A fifty-seven million year old fossil of Paleocene epoch flora shows specimens virtually identical to modern samples. It has a life cycle featuring alternation of generations, sexual and asexual reproduction; its sporophyte generation matures in autumn, casts its spores in the spring and the gametophyte generation follows. Sporophytes require 5–10 years of growth before reaching their mature fern height.

Sensitive ferns propagate by both spore dispersion and rhizome growth. Its growth clusters attract local fauna where small wildlife find habitat, deer bed upon its dense mat and in winter wild turkeys use the fertile spore stalks as a secondary food source. They can become aggressive and a nuisance if established near preferable vegetation. The University of Maine's Cooperative Extension: Maine Wild Blueberries classifies the sensitive fern as a herbaceous broadleaf weed.

Its deciduous fronds do not tolerate freezing temperatures, however, the plant survives USDA hardiness zones 4–8, or minimum temperatures of −20 to −15 °C (−4 to 5 °F) having the Royal Horticultural Society's H6 rating. Winter survival is enhanced if the dried frond petiole bases are left intact.

Nutrient beneficial ectotrophic mycorrhizal associations may occur in Onoclea sensibilis, Pteridium aquilinum and Adiantum pedatum located in oak and hickory forests.

Onoclea sensibilis is a wetland indicator, listed as a Facultative Wetland Hydrophyte in the 2013 (US) National Wetland Plant List due to its observed affinity for wetter soils.

Opinion is mixed regarding the species' tolerance to disturbance of its growing environment. In one forest setting, a decade long decline was noticed following even single-cut tree felling operations. In other settings sensitive ferns appear opportunistic, disturbance not being a problem. They spread to form colonies, often the first species to inhabit disturbed areas.

=== Pests and diseases ===
Onoclea sensibilis hosts insects, fungi, bacteria and even a parasitic vine, Cuscuta gronovii (scaldweed), that can overgrow and constrict it.

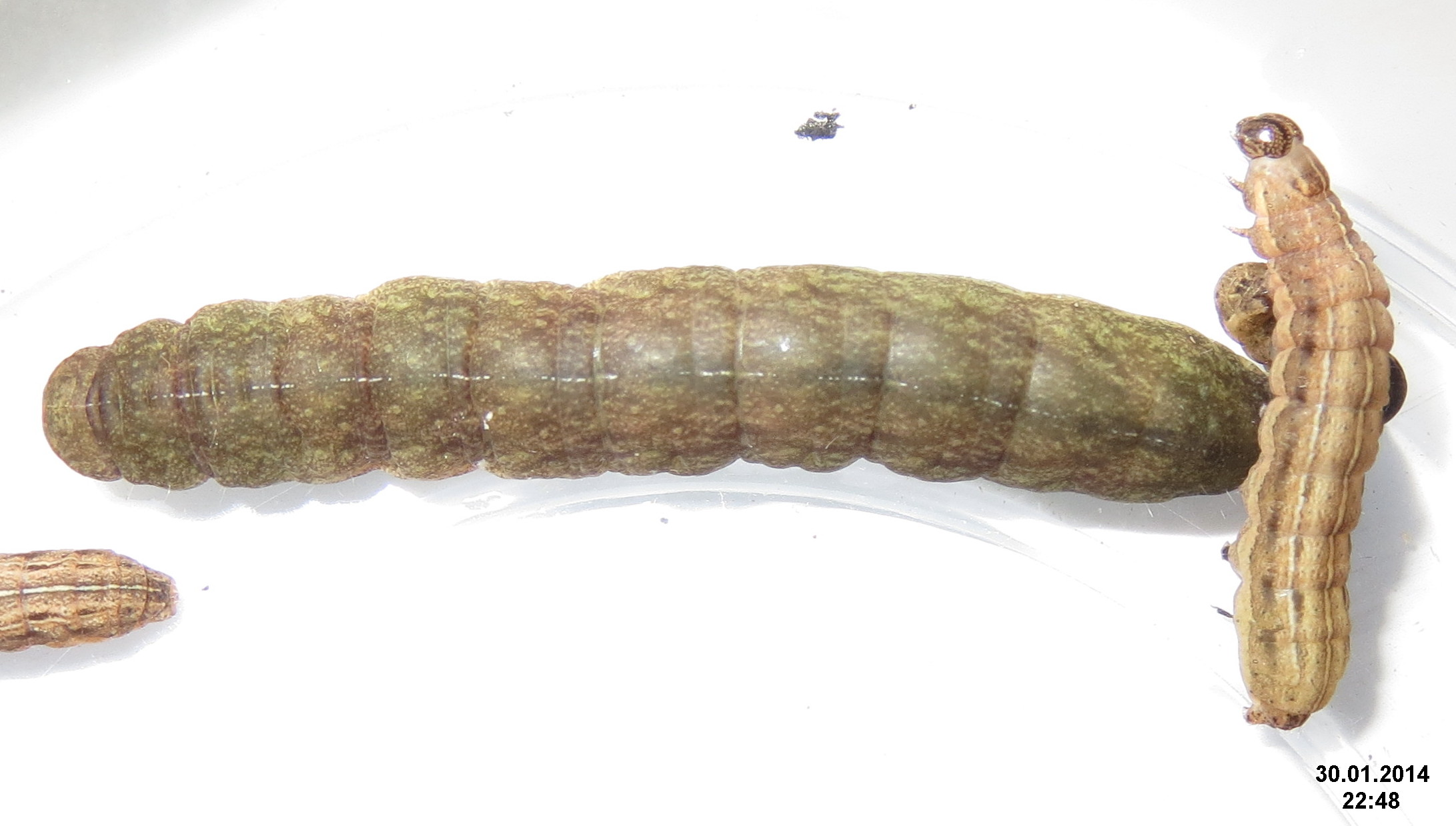
Phlogophora iris- Olive angle shades, aka olive sausage

==== Insects ====
Insects feeding upon the Onoclea sensibilis target both its leaves and rhizome roots. Amphorophora ampullata fern aphids, Chirosia gleniensis fern miners and the larvae of sawflies Hemitaxonus dubitatus and Stromboceros delicatulus feed on its leaves. Larvae of moth species Phlogophora iris (olive angle shades, pictured), Callopistria cordata (silver-spotted fern moth) and Papaipema inquaesita (Sensitive Fern Borer) are known to feed on both stems and rhizomes.

==== Fungi ====
Parasitic fungi include Ceratobasidium anceps, causing frond and stem necrosis; Ceratobasidium cornigerum, covering stems with saprophyte growths; and Uredinopsis mirabilis, a distinct rust species unique to the Sensitive Fern. Invasive fungi like Taphrina filicina, and Taphrina hiratsukae can infect leaves, causing blisters.

Fungi can develop beneath beech trees, where aphid honeydew secretions accumulate; these strictly epiphyllous honeydew fungi, Sclerotiomyces colchicus and Scorias spongiosa (Schwein.) Fr., have been recorded on Onoclea sensibilis, where their sooty mold buildup impairs leaf function.

==== Bacteria ====
Onoclea sensibilis can host Burkholderia plantarii which causes stem lesions. B. plantarii is a pathogen of bacterial seedling blight in rice. In a multi-year study the weedy presence of O. sensibilis at rice paddy fields and a means to convey the bacterium (rainfall runoff) implicated it as the source of bacterial blight outbreaks when paired with enabling environmental conditions.

== Toxicity ==
=== Pharmacology ===
Onoclea sensibilis has two internally-synthesized chemical defenses against insects. Ingesting any part of the plant introduces thiaminase enzymes and phytoecdysteroid hormones which can disrupt an insect's molting cycle, preventing its full development.

=== Mammal ===
Onoclea sensibilis has been implicated in equine poisoning and death, especially if eaten in quantity. The exact cause is unproven, but thiaminase poisoning, causing an extreme Vitamin B1 deficiency is suspected.

==== Human ====
Its human toxicity is not well defined; no specific warnings for Onoclea sensibilis have been found. Its summaries, however, frequently include precautionary statements that ferns, in general, may contain natural carcinogens and/or the enzyme thiaminase, the latter being dangerous in high concentration. Historically, some Native American peoples have consumed Onoclea sensibilis without apparent distress; see Food uses in this article.

== Uses ==
=== Food ===
Onoclea sensibilis has limited value for food use, considered a famine food by some and reserved for times of scarcity. Cooking heat eliminates its thiaminase content. The Haudenosaunee treated Onoclea sensibilis as an early springtime vegetable, prepared like spinach, the fiddleheads cooked and "seasoned with salt, pepper or butter" (Waugh, 1916). After removing the "brown scales" (sori), leaves were processed likewise. Its young shoots have been sold as delicacies in Asian markets.

=== Horticultural ===
It is cultivated as an ornamental plant in traditional and native plant gardens, and in natural landscaping and habitat restoration projects. It has gained the Royal Horticultural Society's Award of Garden Merit. Gardeners employ rhizome division and are aided by spore harvesting guides. Its decomposing fronds make an effective mulch, suppressing undergrowth. Plantings can become aggressive, weedy if not sited properly.

=== Decorative ===
Its cut fronds are used in dried flower arrangements.

=== Folk medicine ===
Historically, Native American peoples used Onoclea sensibilis for oral and topical indigenous treatments.

== See also ==
- Also see the Polish Wikipedia article for Onoclea sensibilis.
