= Chirosia pusillans =

Scientific classification
- Kingdom: Animalia
- Phylum: Arthropoda
- Class: Insecta
- Order: Diptera
- Family: Anthomyiidae
- Genus: Chirosia
- Species: C. pusillans

Binomial name
- Chirosia pusillans (Huckett, 1949)

Synonyms
- Hylemyia pusillans Huckett, 1949

Species of fly

Chirosia pusillans is a species of root-maggot flies in the family Anthomyiidae. It is known to lay its eggs on Athyrium asplenioides.
