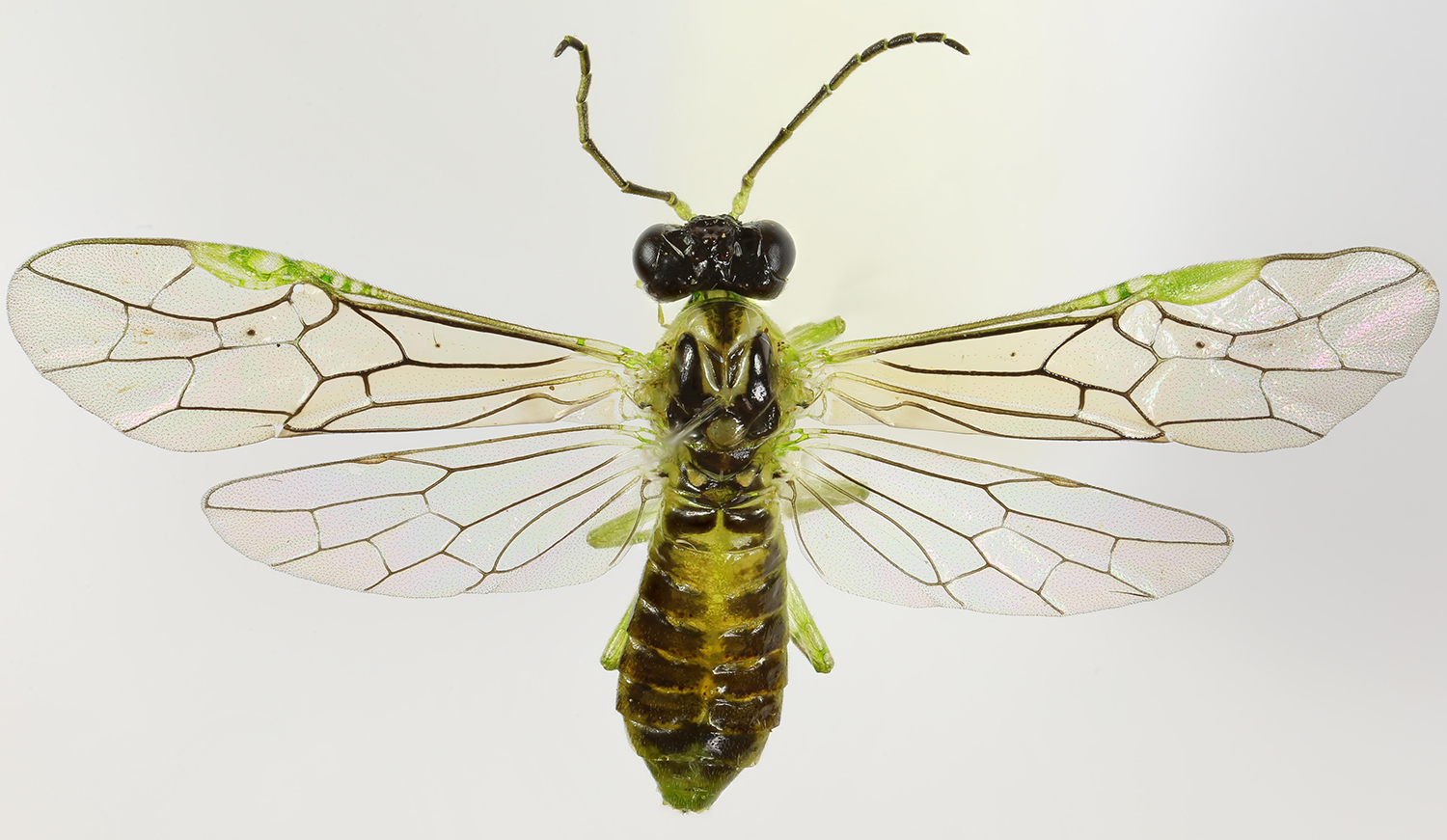
- Strombocerus delicatulus, Fenn's Wood, North Wales

Scientific classification
- Domain: Eukaryota
- Kingdom: Animalia
- Phylum: Arthropoda
- Class: Insecta
- Order: Hymenoptera
- Suborder: Symphyta
- Family: Tenthredinidae
- Genus: Stromboceros
- Species: S. delicatulus

Binomial name
- Stromboceros delicatulus (Fallén, 1808)

= Stromboceros delicatulus =

Species of sawfly

Stromboceros delicatulus is a Palearctic species of sawfly belonging to the genus Stromboceros.

Its larvae feed on ferns, e.g., Athyrium filix-femina (common ladyfern), Dryopteris filix-mas (male fern), Onoclea sensibilis (sensitive fern) and Pteridium aquilinum (bracken fern).
