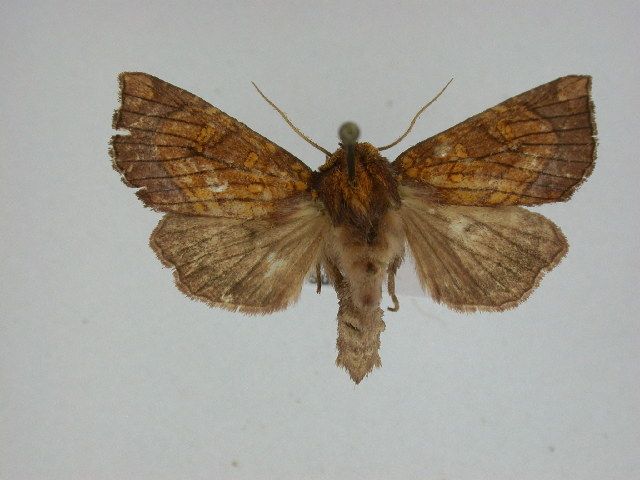

Scientific classification
- Kingdom: Animalia
- Phylum: Arthropoda
- Class: Insecta
- Order: Lepidoptera
- Superfamily: Noctuoidea
- Family: Noctuidae
- Genus: Papaipema
- Species: P. inquaesita

Binomial name
- Papaipema inquaesita (Grote & Robinson, 1868)

= Papaipema inquaesita =

Species of moth

Papaipema inquaesita, the sensitive fern borer, is a species of cutworm or dart moth in the family Noctuidae. It is found in North America.

The MONA or Hodges number for Papaipema inquaesita is 9483.
