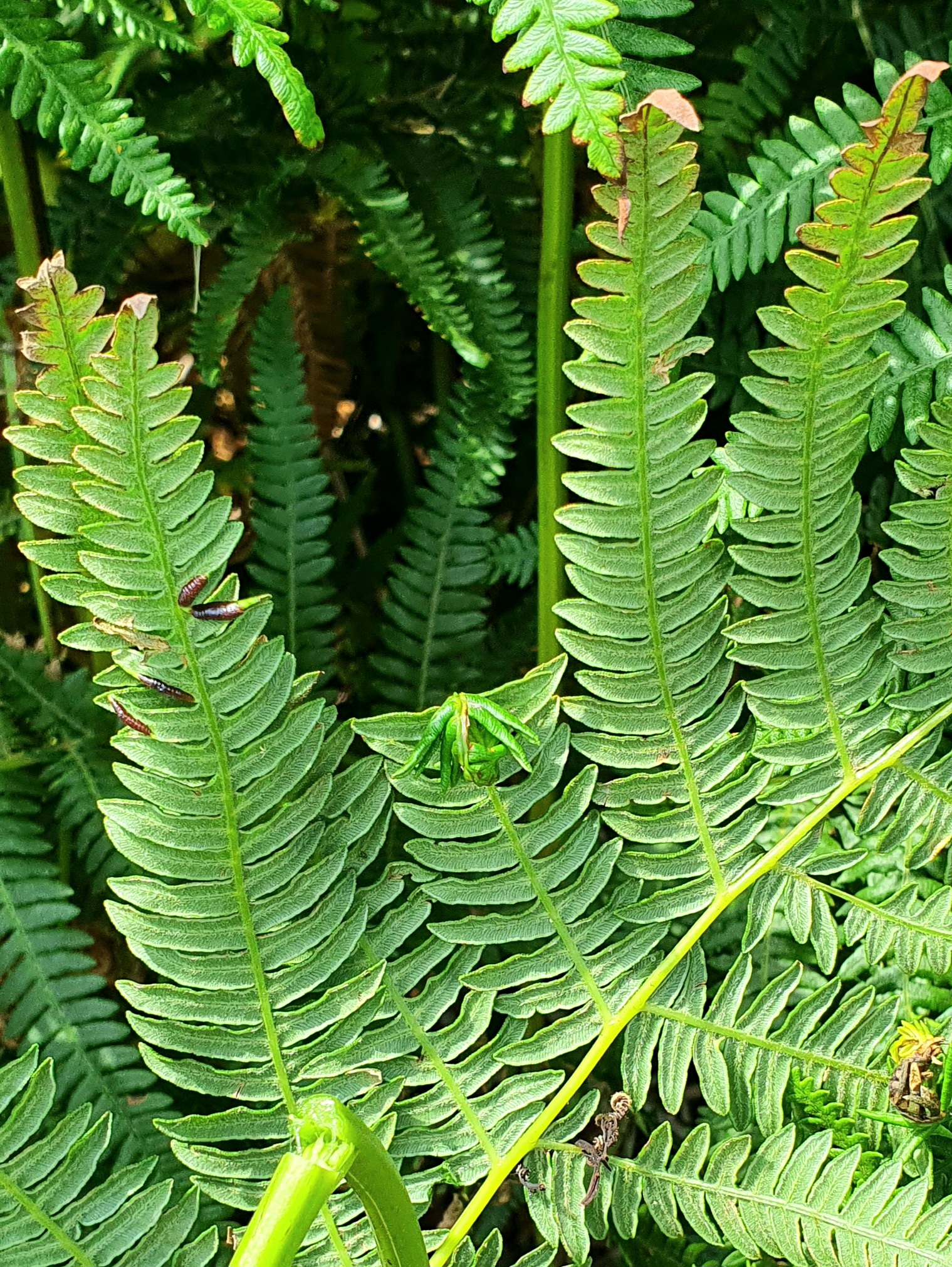

Scientific classification
- Kingdom: Animalia
- Phylum: Arthropoda
- Class: Insecta
- Order: Diptera
- Family: Anthomyiidae
- Genus: Chirosia
- Species: C. grossicauda

Binomial name
- Chirosia grossicauda Strobl, 1899

= Chirosia grossicauda =

Species of fly

Chirosia grossicauda is a species of fly found in Europe. The larvae mine the lower rachis of bracken causing a swelling, known as a gall.

== Lifecycle ==
A white maggot mines the central vein of the pinnule (a secondary division of a frond of bracken) causing the tip to roll downwards. The larva probably pupate in the gall, but are likely to fall out when the fronds wither and fall to the ground, pupating in the leaf litter.

=== Parasites ===
Larva of Trybliographa ciliaris are endoparasitoid of the larvae of Chirosia grossicauda.

== Distribution ==
In Europe the fly is found from Ireland to Russia and from the Iberian Peninsula to Scandinavia. It has also been recorded in South Africa.
