= Chirosia =

Scientific classification
- Domain: Eukaryota
- Kingdom: Animalia
- Phylum: Arthropoda
- Class: Insecta
- Order: Diptera
- Family: Anthomyiidae
- Subfamily: Anthomyiinae
- Tribe: Chirosiini
- Genus: Chirosia; Rondani, 1856

Genus of flies

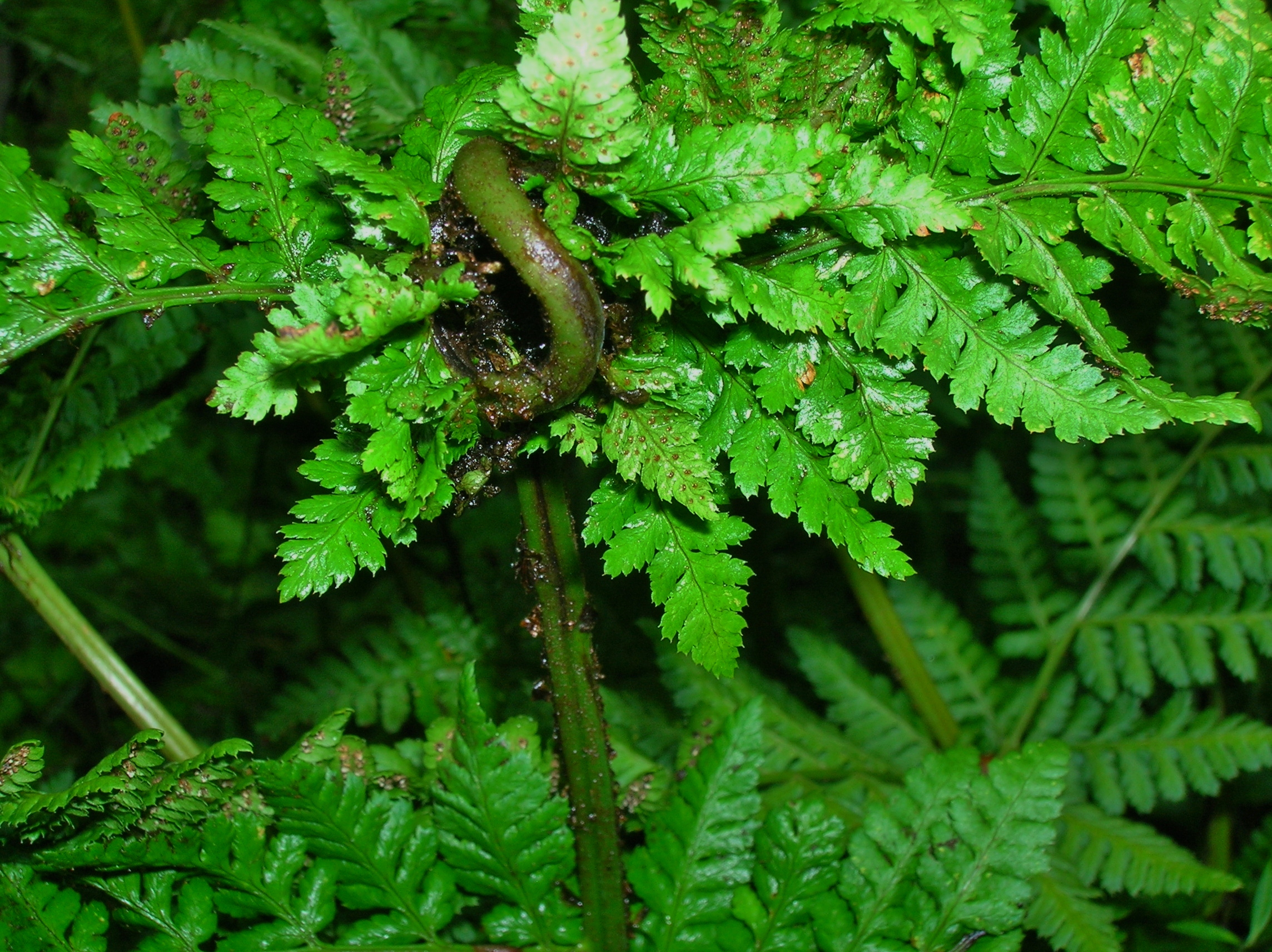
Chirosia betuleti galls on a fern

Chirosia is a genus of root-maggot flies in the family Anthomyiidae. There are over fifty described species in Chirosia.

== Species ==
These 58 species belong to the genus Chirosia:

- C. aberrans Collin, 1955^{c g}
- C. abundepilosa (Hennig, 1974)^{c g}
- C. aconiti (Ringdahl, 1948)^{c g}
- C. albifrons Tiensuu, 1938^{c g}
- C. albitarsis (Zetterstedt, 1845)^{c g}
- C. alpicola Villeneuve, 1923^{c g}
- C. arnolitra (Huckett, 1924)^{i c g}
- C. asperistilata Suwa, 1974^{c g}
- C. asymmetrica Suwa, 2006^{c g}
- C. beckeri Schnabl, 1911^{c g}
- C. betuleti (Ringdahl, 1935)^{i c g b}
- C. bisinuata (Tiensuu, 1939)^{c g}
- C. cinerosa (Zetterstedt, 1845)^{i c g}
- C. consobrina (Huckett, 1929)^{i c g}
- C. crassiseta Stein, 1908^{c g}
- C. delicata (Huckett, 1949)^{i c g}
- C. filicis (Huckett, 1949)^{i c g b}
- C. flavipennis (Fallén, 1823)^{i c g b}
- C. forcipispatula Xue, 2001^{c g}
- C. frontata Suwa, 1983^{c g}
- C. gleniensis (Huckett, 1924)^{i c g b}
- C. grandivillosa (Huckett, 1924)^{i c g}
- C. griseifrons (Séguy, 1923)^{c g}
- C. grossicauda Strobl, 1899^{c g}
- C. hirtipedella Suwa, 1974^{c g}
- C. histricina (Rondani, 1866)^{c g}
- C. holoptica Griffiths, 2004^{c g}
- C. idahensis Stein, 1898^{i c g}
- C. inspinata Suwa, 1983^{c g}
- C. iobaeksana Kwon & Suh, 1982^{c g}
- C. laticerca Fan, 1984^{c g}
- C. latipennis (Zetterstedt, 1838)^{i c g}
- C. luteipennis (Ringdahl, 1950)^{c g}
- C. megacephala (Malloch, 1920)^{i c g}
- C. miyazakii (Suwa, 1974)^{c g}
- C. montana Pokorny, 1893^{c g}
- C. nigripes Bezzi, 1895^{c g}
- C. nodula Li, Cui & Fan, 1993^{c g}
- C. nudisternata Suwa, 1974^{c g}
- C. orthostylata Qian & Fan, 1981^{c g}
- C. paucisetosa Deng, Li & Sun, 1987^{c g}
- C. platyptera Griffiths, 2004^{c g}
- C. proboscidalis (Malloch, 1920)^{i c g}
- C. pseudocinerosa Griffiths, 2004^{c g}
- C. pusillans (Huckett, 1949)^{i c g b}
- C. rametoka (Suwa, 1974)^{c g}
- C. sapporensis Suwa, 1974^{c g}
- C. setifer Huckett, 1972^{i c g}
- C. shannoni Griffiths, 2004^{c g}
- C. sichuanensis Feng, 1987^{c g}
- C. sikisima (Suwa, 1974)^{c g}
- C. similata (Tiensuu, 1939)^{c g}
- C. sobaeksana (Kwon & Suh, 1982)^{c g}
- C. spatuliforceps (Fan & Chu, 1982)^{c g}
- C. spinosissima (Malloch, 1919)^{i c g}
- C. stratifrons (Huckett, 1949)^{i c g}
- C. styloplasis Zheng & Fan, 1990^{c g}
- C. yukara Suwa, 1974^{c g}

Data sources: i = ITIS, c = Catalogue of Life, g = GBIF, b = Bugguide.net
