= Chirosia flavipennis =

Scientific classification
- Domain: Eukaryota
- Kingdom: Animalia
- Phylum: Arthropoda
- Class: Insecta
- Order: Diptera
- Family: Anthomyiidae
- Subfamily: Anthomyiinae
- Tribe: Chirosiini
- Genus: Chirosia
- Species: C. flavipennis

Binomial name
- Chirosia flavipennis (Fallen, 1823)

Synonyms
- Musca flavipennis Fallen, 1823; Pycnoglossa flavipennis Coquillett, 1901

Species of fly

Chirosia flavipennis is a species of root-maggot flies in the family Anthomyiidae. It is a leaf miner of the host species Pteridium aquilinum.
