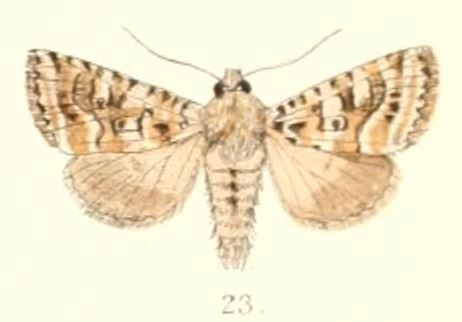

Scientific classification
- Domain: Eukaryota
- Kingdom: Animalia
- Phylum: Arthropoda
- Class: Insecta
- Order: Lepidoptera
- Superfamily: Noctuoidea
- Family: Noctuidae
- Genus: Phlogophora
- Species: P. calamistrata

Binomial name
- Phlogophora calamistrata (Moore, 1882)

Synonyms
- Dianthecia calamistrata Moore, 1882 [sic]

= Phlogophora calamistrata =

Species of moth

Phlogophora calamistrata is a species of moth of the family Noctuidae first described by Frederic Moore in 1882. It is found in India.
