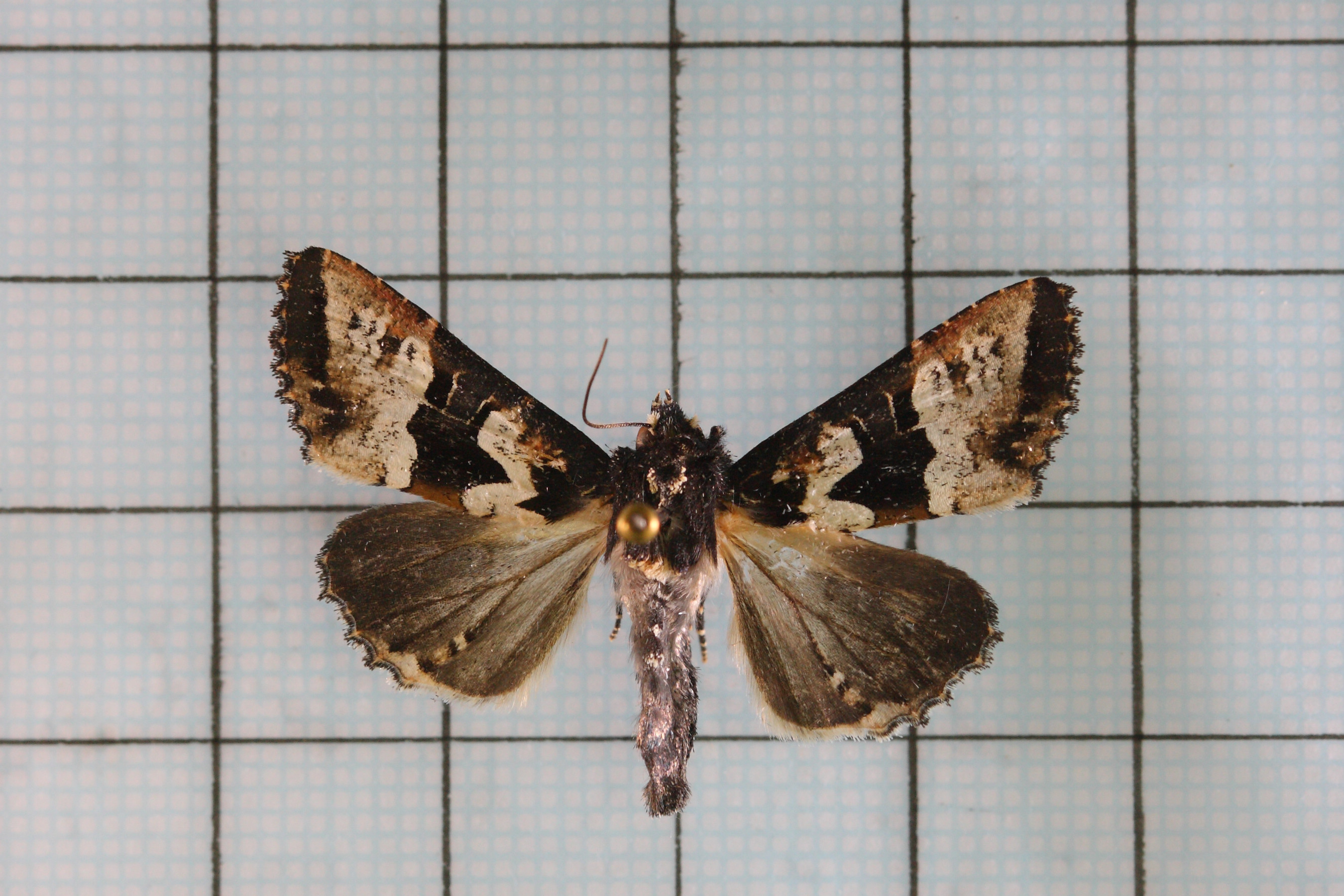

Scientific classification
- Domain: Eukaryota
- Kingdom: Animalia
- Phylum: Arthropoda
- Class: Insecta
- Order: Lepidoptera
- Superfamily: Noctuoidea
- Family: Noctuidae
- Genus: Phlogophora
- Species: P. albovittata

Binomial name
- Phlogophora albovittata (Moore, 1867)

Synonyms
- Euplexia albovittata Moore, 1867

= Phlogophora albovittata =

Species of moth

Phlogophora albovittata is a species of moth of the family Noctuidae. It is found from the Himalaya to Japan and Taiwan.

The wingspan is 37–42 mm.
