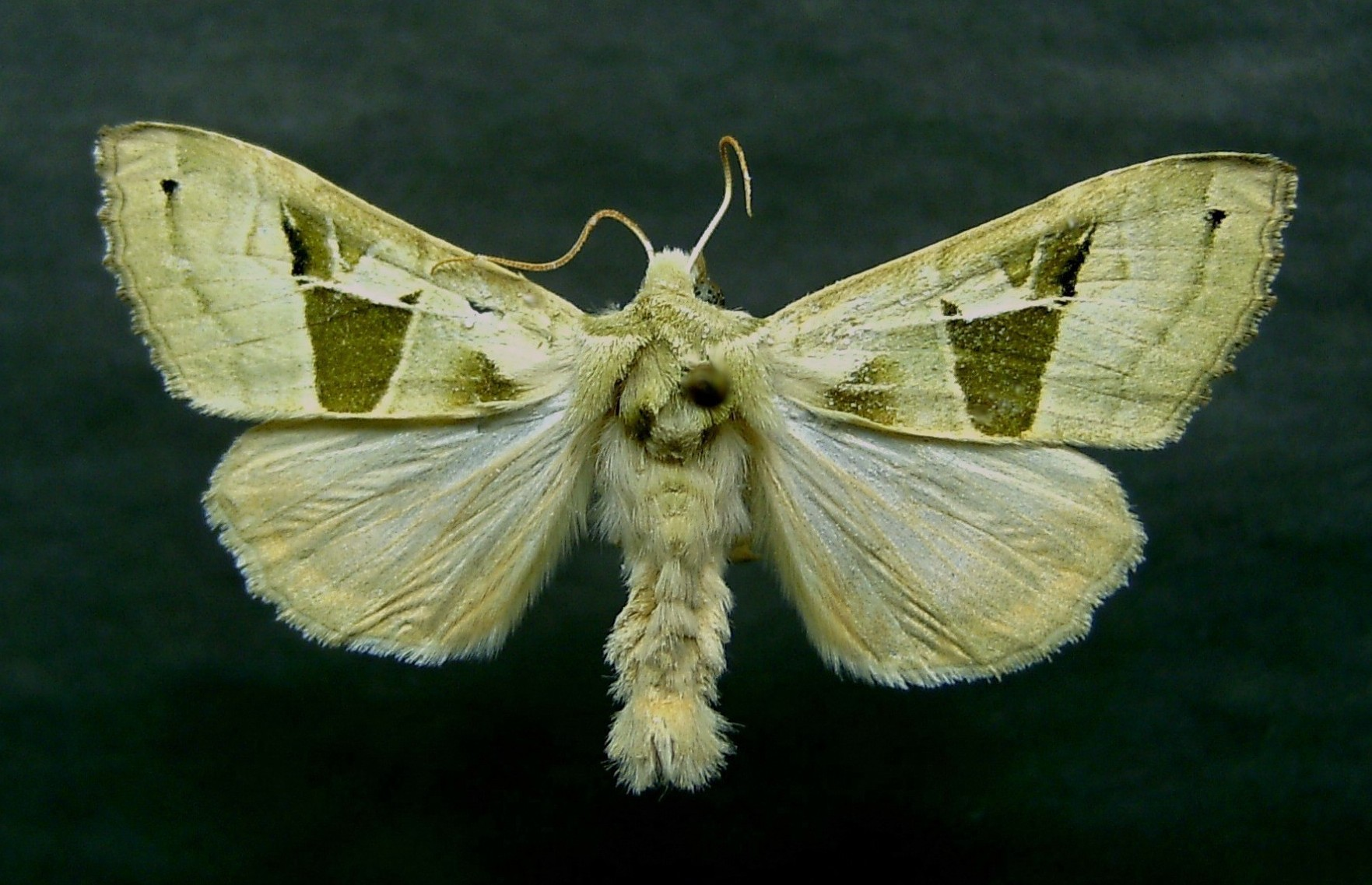
- Phlogophora scita

Scientific classification
- Domain: Eukaryota
- Kingdom: Animalia
- Phylum: Arthropoda
- Class: Insecta
- Order: Lepidoptera
- Superfamily: Noctuoidea
- Family: Noctuidae
- Subfamily: Noctuinae
- Tribe: Phlogophorini
- Genus: Phlogophora; Treitschke, 1825

= Phlogophora =

Genus of moths

Phlogophora is a genus of moths of the family Noctuidae first described by Georg Treitschke in 1825.

== Species ==
- Phlogophora africarabica (Wiltshire, 1986)
- Phlogophora albifrons (Prout, 1928)
- Phlogophora albovittata (Moore, 1867)
- Phlogophora altitudinis (Viette, 1960)
- Phlogophora aureopuncta (Hampson, 1908)
- Phlogophora beata (Draudt, 1950)
- Phlogophora beatrix Butler, 1878
- Phlogophora burmana (Berio, 1972)
- Phlogophora cabrali Pinker, 1971
- Phlogophora calamistrata (Moore, 1882)
- Phlogophora camusi (Viette, 1967)
- Phlogophora chlorophragma (Prout, 1928)
- Phlogophora clava (Wileman, 1912)
- Phlogophora columbina (Draudt, 1950)
- Phlogophora conservuloides (Hampson, 1898)
- Phlogophora contrasta (Holloway, 1976)
- Phlogophora costalis (Moore, 1882)
- Phlogophora decorata (Moore, 1882)
- Phlogophora discalis (Warren, 1912)
- Phlogophora diseisignata (Moore, 1867)
- Phlogophora distorta (Moore, 1881)
- Phlogophora emphanes (Prout, 1926)
- Phlogophora furnasi Pinker, 1971
- Phlogophora fuscomarginata Leech, 1900
- Phlogophora gamma (Prout, 1925)
- Phlogophora gamoeensis (Prout, 1926)
- Phlogophora gustavssoni (Berio, 1972)
- Phlogophora humilis Hreblay & Ronkay, 1998
- Phlogophora illustrata (Graeser, 1889)
- Phlogophora interrupta (Hampson, 1908)
- Phlogophora inusitata (Saalmüller, 1891)
- Phlogophora iris Guenée, 1852 – olive angle shades
- Phlogophora ischnogramma (Prout, 1928)
- Phlogophora isoscelata (Prout, 1926)
- Phlogophora kinabalua (Holloway, 1976)
- Phlogophora kruegeri Saldaitis & Ivinskis, 2006
- Phlogophora latifascia (Prout, 1922)
- Phlogophora latilinea (Prout, 1928)
- Phlogophora leucomelas (Prout, 1928)
- Phlogophora lignosa (Holloway, 1976)
- Phlogophora magma (Holloway, 1976)
- Phlogophora malaisei (Berio, 1972)
- Phlogophora meticulodina (Draudt, 1950)
- Phlogophora meticulosa (Linnaeus, 1758) – angle shades
- Phlogophora muluensis Holloway, 1989
- Phlogophora nigroplumbea (Warren, 1912)
- Phlogophora nobilis Hreblay & Ronkay, 1998
- Phlogophora pectinata (Warren, 1888)
- Phlogophora periculosa Guenée, 1852 – brown angle shades
- Phlogophora plumbeola (Hampson, 1894)
- Phlogophora pretiosa (Viette, 1960)
- Phlogophora retorta (Berio, 1955)
- Phlogophora rostrifera (Warren, 1912)
- Phlogophora scita (Hübner, 1790)
- Phlogophora sinuosa (Moore, 1881)
- Phlogophora sogai (Viette, 1960)
- Phlogophora striatovirens (Moore, 1867)
- Phlogophora styx (Holloway, 1976)
- Phlogophora subpurpurea Leech, 1900
- Phlogophora szecsenyii (Hreblay & Ronkay, 1998)
- Phlogophora triangula (Holloway, 1976)
- Phlogophora tricolor (Prout, 1928)
- Phlogophora tristictica (Berio, 1976)
- Phlogophora violacea (Berio, 1972)
- Phlogophora viridivena (Holloway, 1976)
- Phlogophora wollastoni Bethune-Baker, 1891
