= Chirosia gleniensis =

Scientific classification
- Kingdom: Animalia
- Phylum: Arthropoda
- Class: Insecta
- Order: Diptera
- Family: Anthomyiidae
- Subfamily: Anthomyiinae
- Tribe: Chirosiini
- Genus: Chirosia
- Species: C. gleniensis

Binomial name
- Chirosia gleniensis (Huckett, 1924)

Synonyms
- Pogonomyza gleniensis Huckett, 1924

Species of fly

Chirosia gleniensis is a species of root-maggot flies in the family Anthomyiidae. It is a leaf miner of Onoclea sensibilis.
