= Chirosia inspinata =

Scientific classification
- Kingdom: Animalia
- Phylum: Arthropoda
- Clade: Pancrustacea
- Class: Insecta
- Order: Diptera
- Family: Anthomyiidae
- Genus: Chirosia
- Species: C. inspinata

Binomial name
- Chirosia inspinata Suwa, 1983

Species of fly

Chirosia inspinata is a species of fly from the Chirosia genus, Anthomyiidae family, described by Masayoshi Suwa in 1983. According to Catalogue of Life The species of Chirosia inspinata does not have known subspecies.
