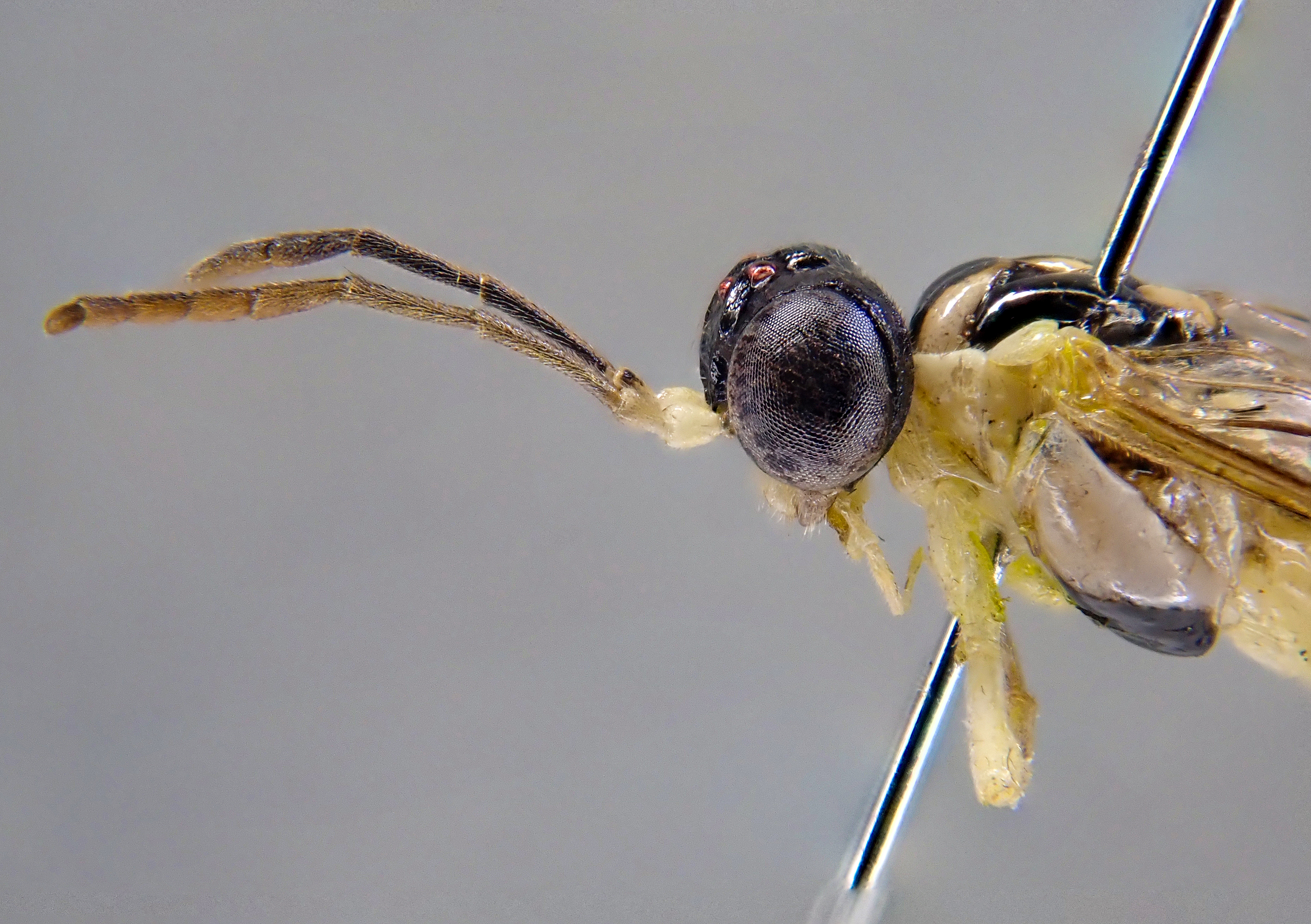
- Stromboceros delicatulus

Scientific classification
- Domain: Eukaryota
- Kingdom: Animalia
- Phylum: Arthropoda
- Class: Insecta
- Order: Hymenoptera
- Suborder: Symphyta
- Family: Tenthredinidae
- Genus: Stromboceros; Konow, 1885

= Stromboceros =

Genus of insects

Stromboceros is a genus of insects belonging to the family Tenthredinidae.

The species of this genus are found in Europe and America.

Species:

- Stromboceros albimaculatus Rohwer
- Stromboceros assamensis Rohwer
- Stromboceros delicatulus
