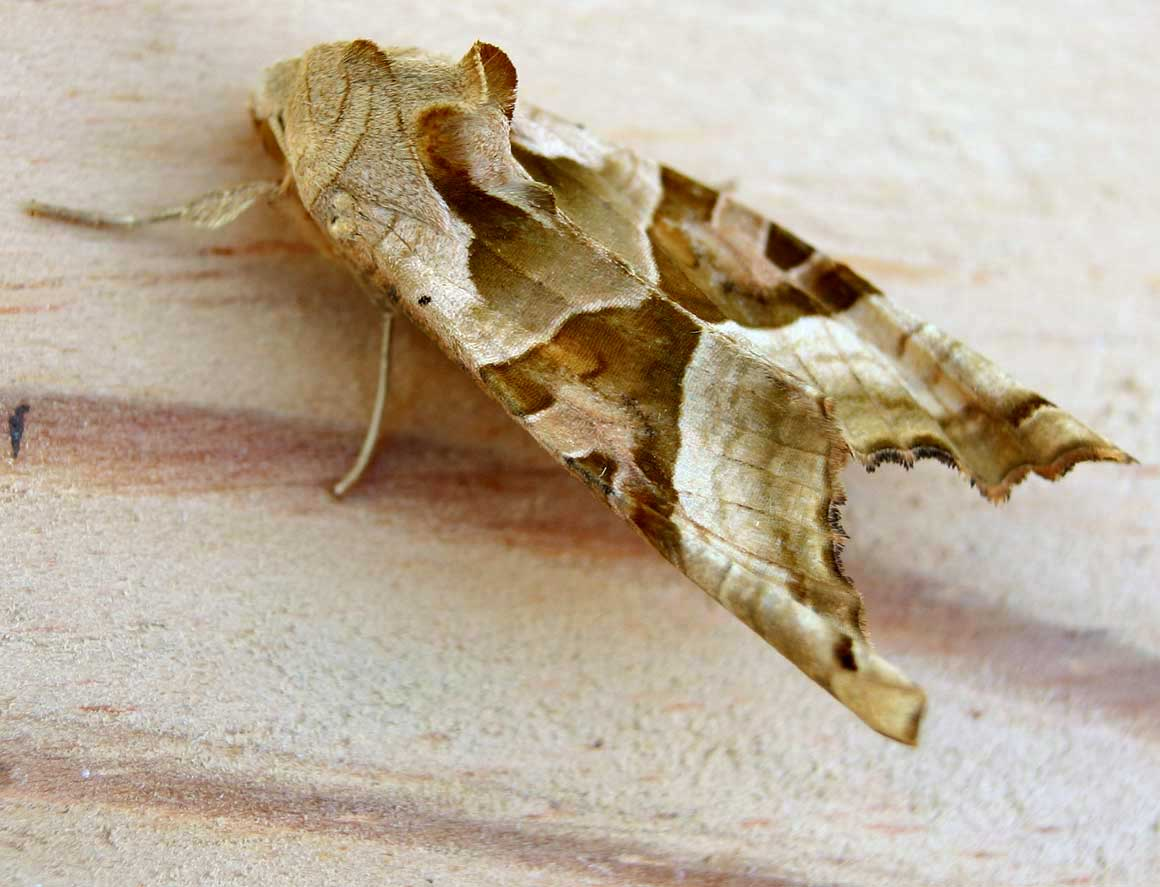

Scientific classification
- Kingdom: Animalia
- Phylum: Arthropoda
- Clade: Pancrustacea
- Class: Insecta
- Order: Lepidoptera
- Superfamily: Noctuoidea
- Family: Noctuidae
- Genus: Phlogophora
- Species: P. meticulosa

Binomial name
- Phlogophora meticulosa (Linnaeus, 1758)

= Angle shades =

Species of moth

The angle shades (Phlogophora meticulosa) is a moth of the family Noctuidae. The species was first described by Carl Linnaeus in his 1758 10th edition of Systema Naturae. It is distributed throughout Europe as far east as the Urals and also in the Azores, in Algeria, and in Asia Minor, Armenia, and Syria. It is a migratory species.

== Description and life cycle ==
This species has a wingspan of 45–52 mm and the forewings are very distinctively shaped with a sharply pointed apex. The common name is derived from the characteristic markings on the forewings: the base colour is buffish, brown towards the termen, and is marked with a bold V-shaped pink-and-green marking. Despite this bright colouring, the angular markings provide excellent disruptive patterning camouflage. The hindwings are whitish with darker venation.

The adults fly between May and October in temperate climates. They have two generations or more a year.

=== Technical description and variation ===
This moth has a wingspan of 45–52 mm. Forewing whitish ochreous, the base and costal area extensively pinkish; a triangular space on inner margin before the inner line, the terminal area beyond submarginal line, and a costal shade beyond outer line olive greenish; central area dark green, pinkish towards costa, triangular in shape, the blunt apex resting on inner margin; the three stigmata more or less rosy green, the two upper with pale lateral edges; outer line double and angled outwards on vein 5; submarginal line preceded by a blackish-green lunule between veins 6 and 7; fringe rufous green, blackish along the excision below vein 4; hindwing pale ochreous, with the discal spot, veins, and often the whole inner half tinged with greenish fuscous; dark outer and double submarginal lines, the latter often forming a grey band below vein 4; ab. roseobrunnea ab. nov [Warren] from São Jorge Island in the Azores, has the central triangle rich red brown tinged with fulvous, the whole wing reddish tinged, and the green shades all strongly mixed with reddish, the metathorax and dorsal tufts also being deep fulvous instead of green.

== Biology ==
This species flies mainly at night and is attracted to light and sugar, including flower nectar such as that of Buddleja. It may often be found in gardens, hedgerows, and woodland. They overwinter in the larval stage, pupating in spring. They are herbaceous, feeding on plants.

The larva is dull green or pinkish brown, thickly dotted with pale; dorsal line whitish, interrupted; lateral lines narrowly whitish; segments 4–11 with oblique darker lateral stripes. The larva is green or brown with reddish spots along the sides and faint dark chevrons along the back. It feeds on a wide variety of plants (see list below).

There is a similar related moth called the small angle shades, Euplexia lucipara.

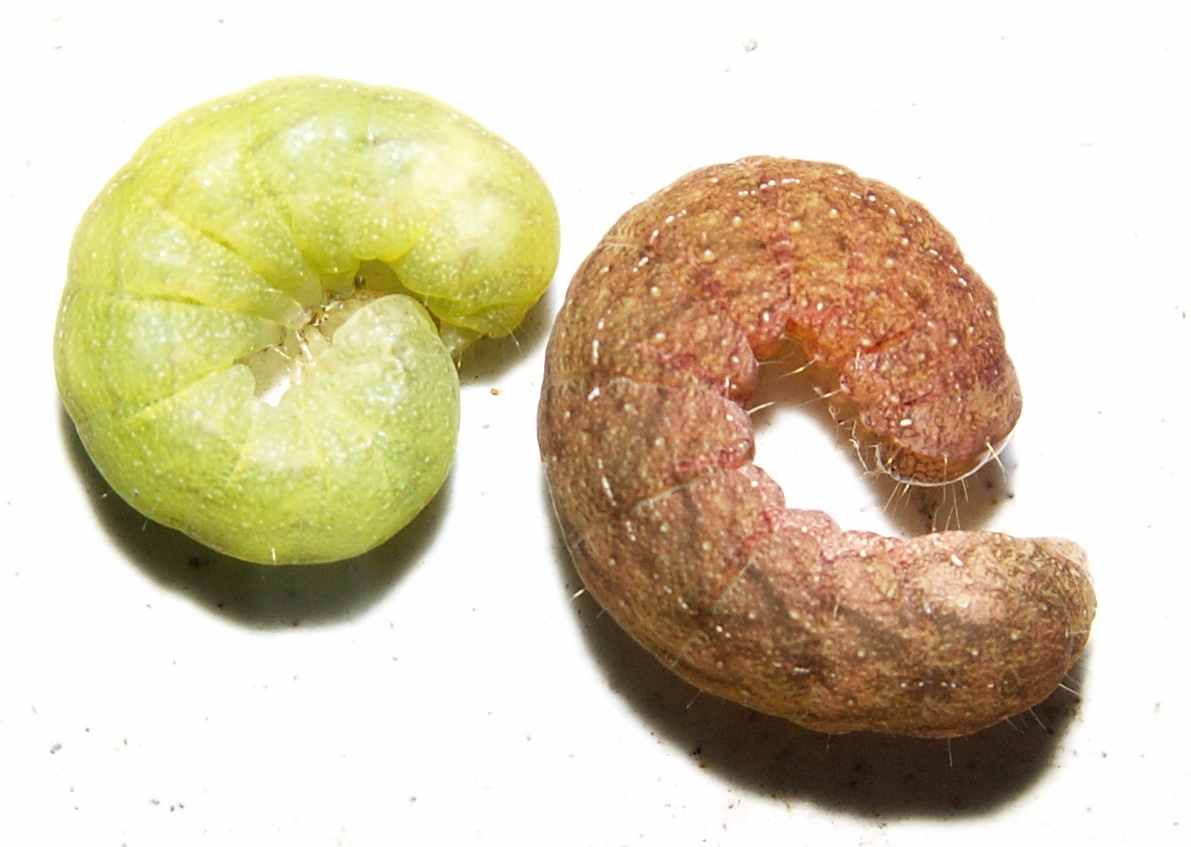
Green and brown larvae

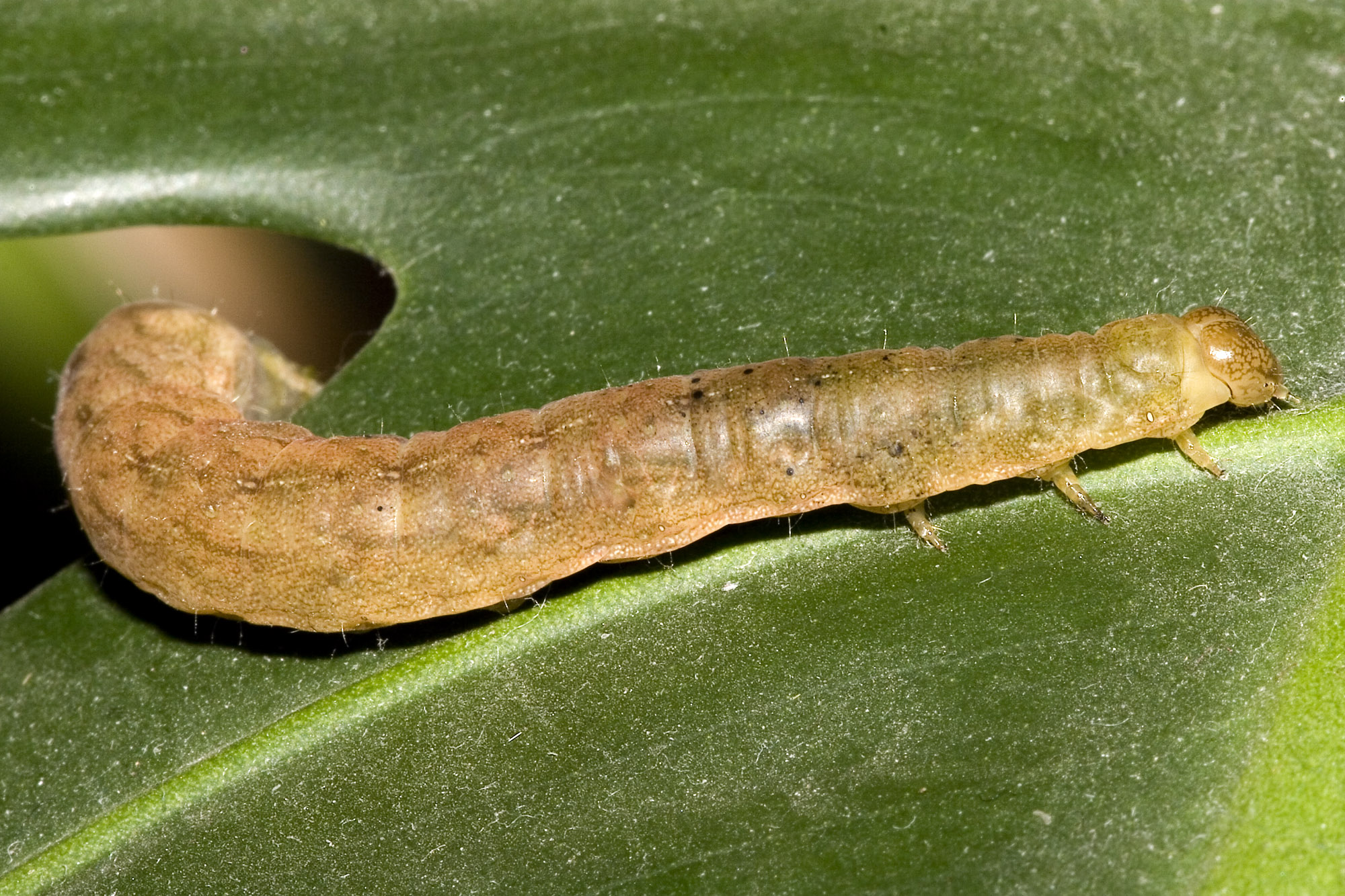
Caterpillar

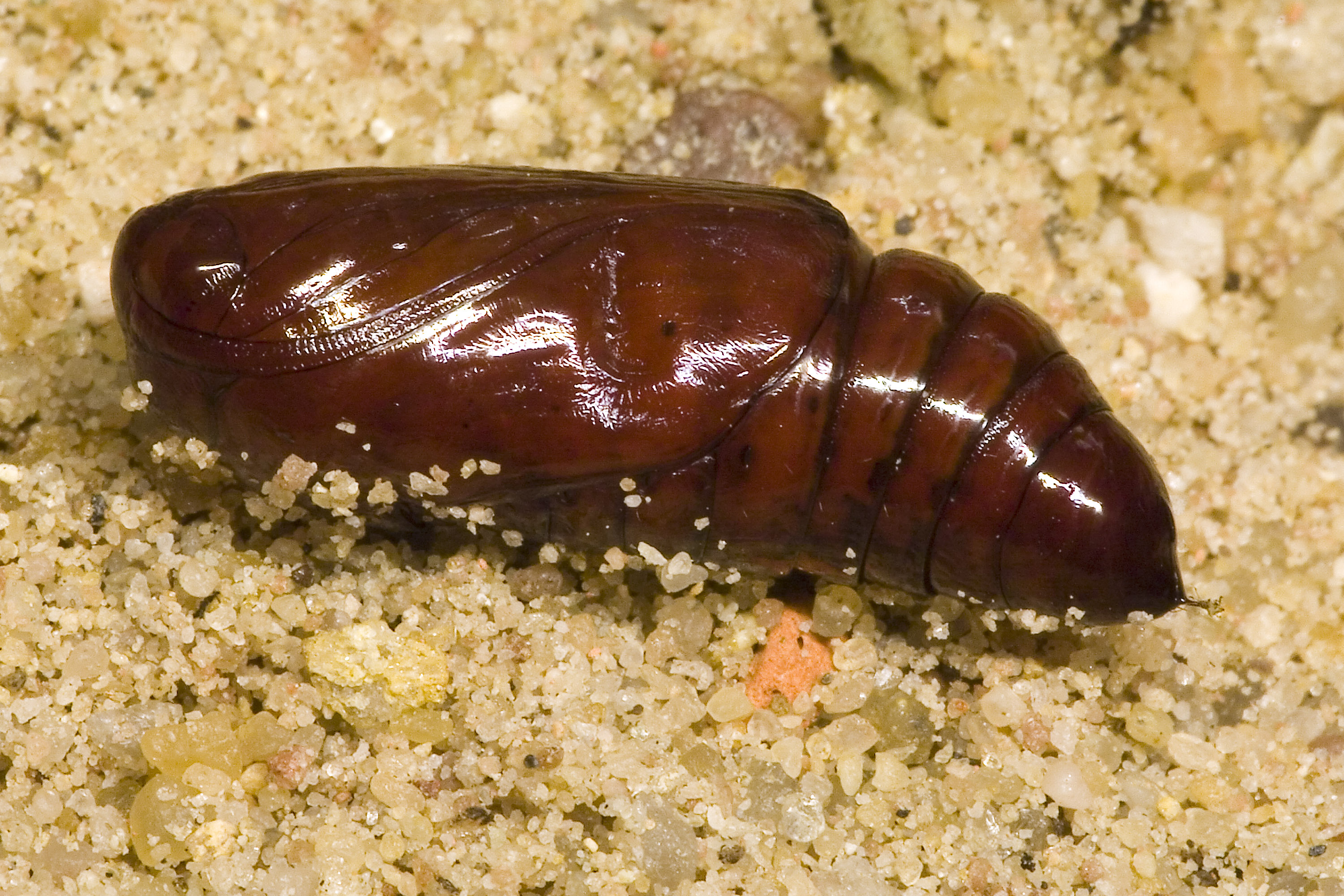
Pupa

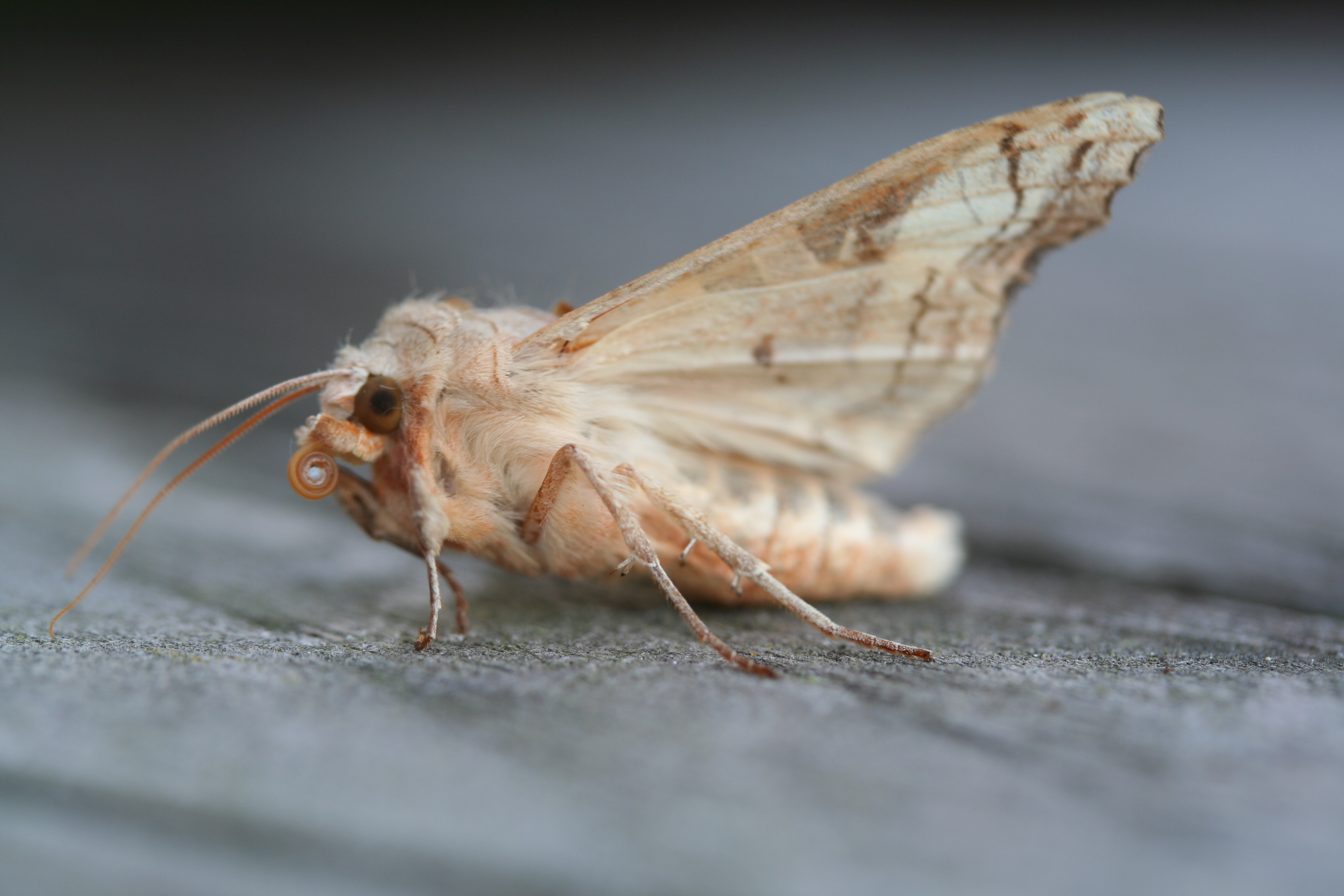
Close-up of imago

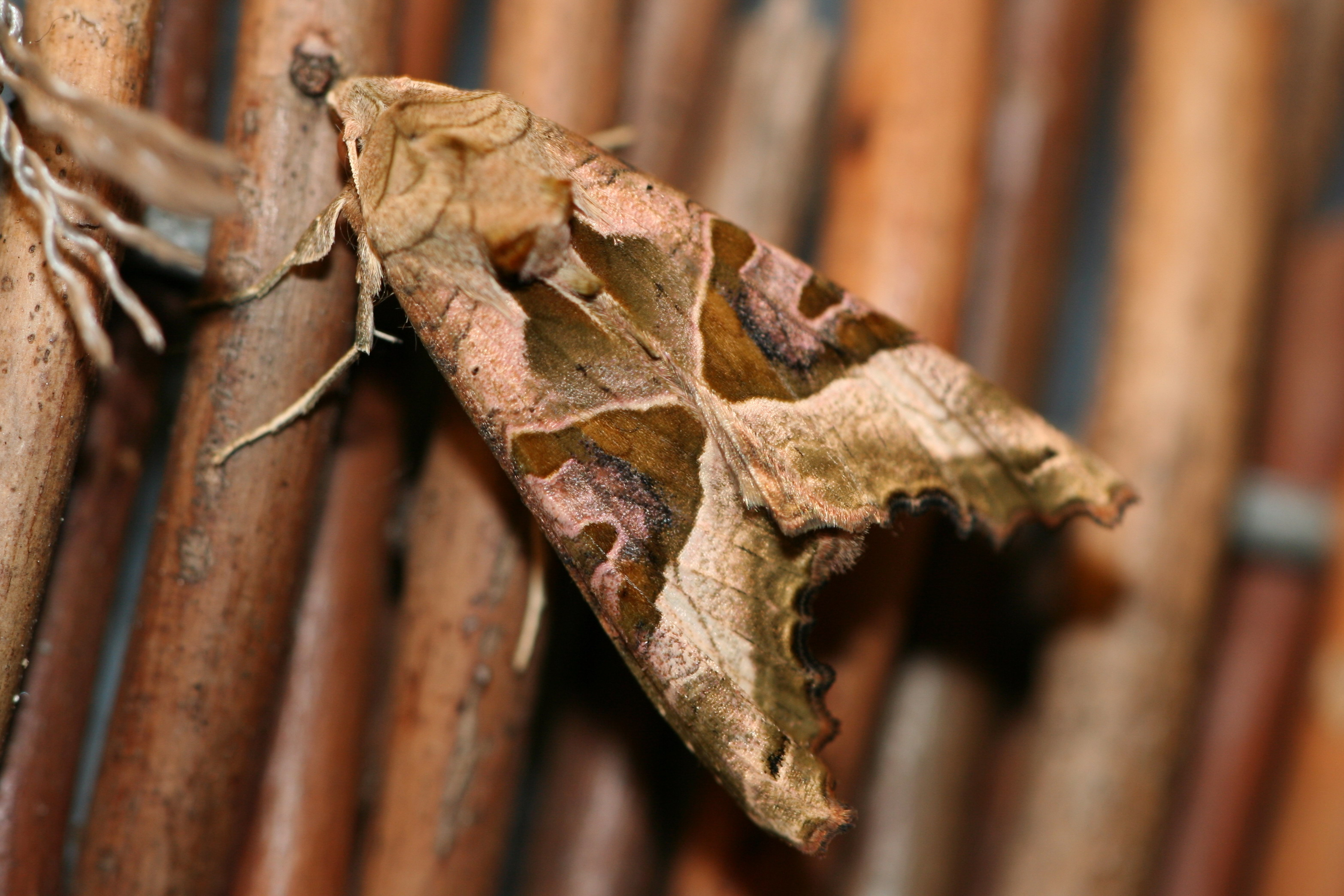

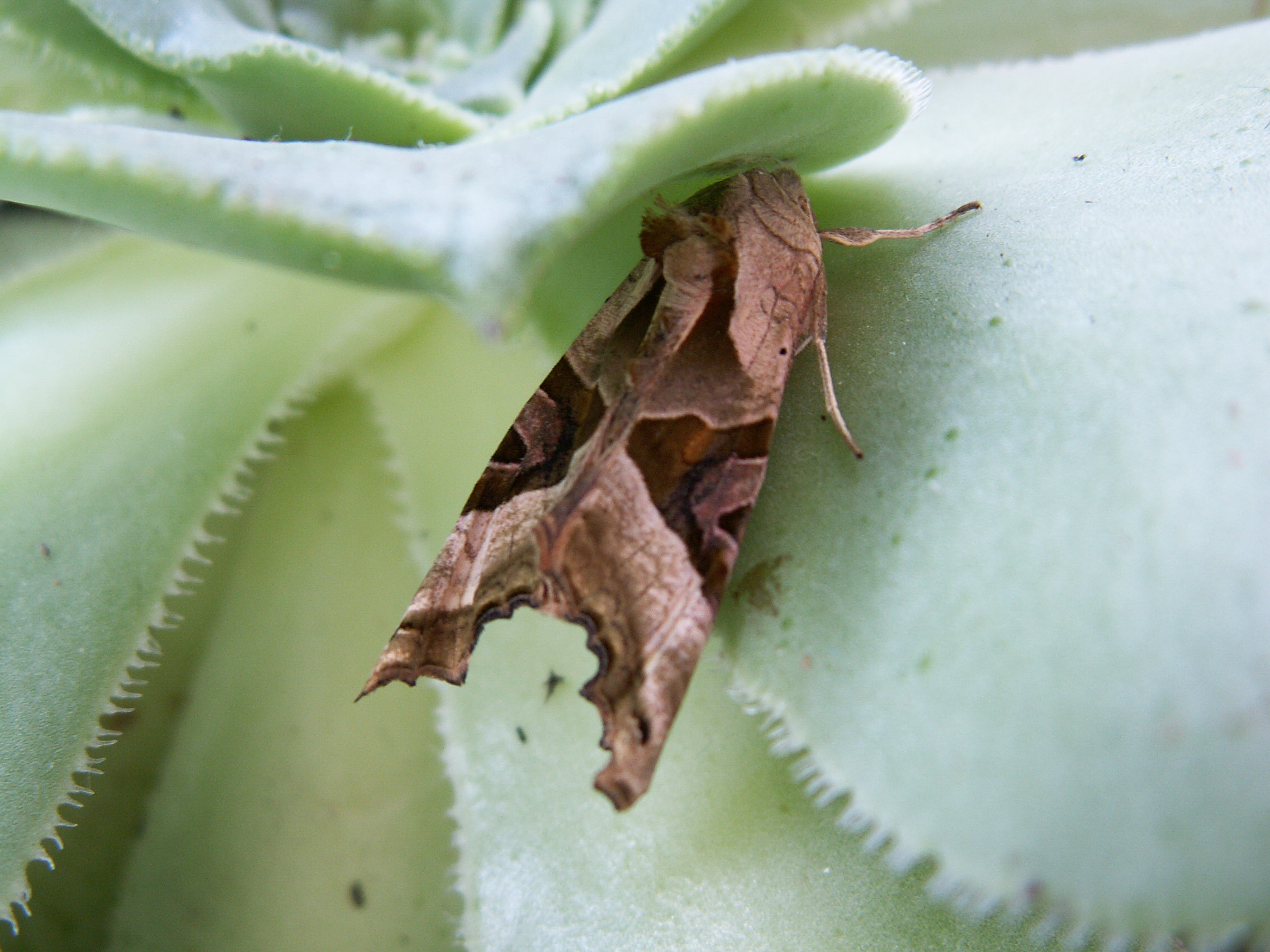
Moth

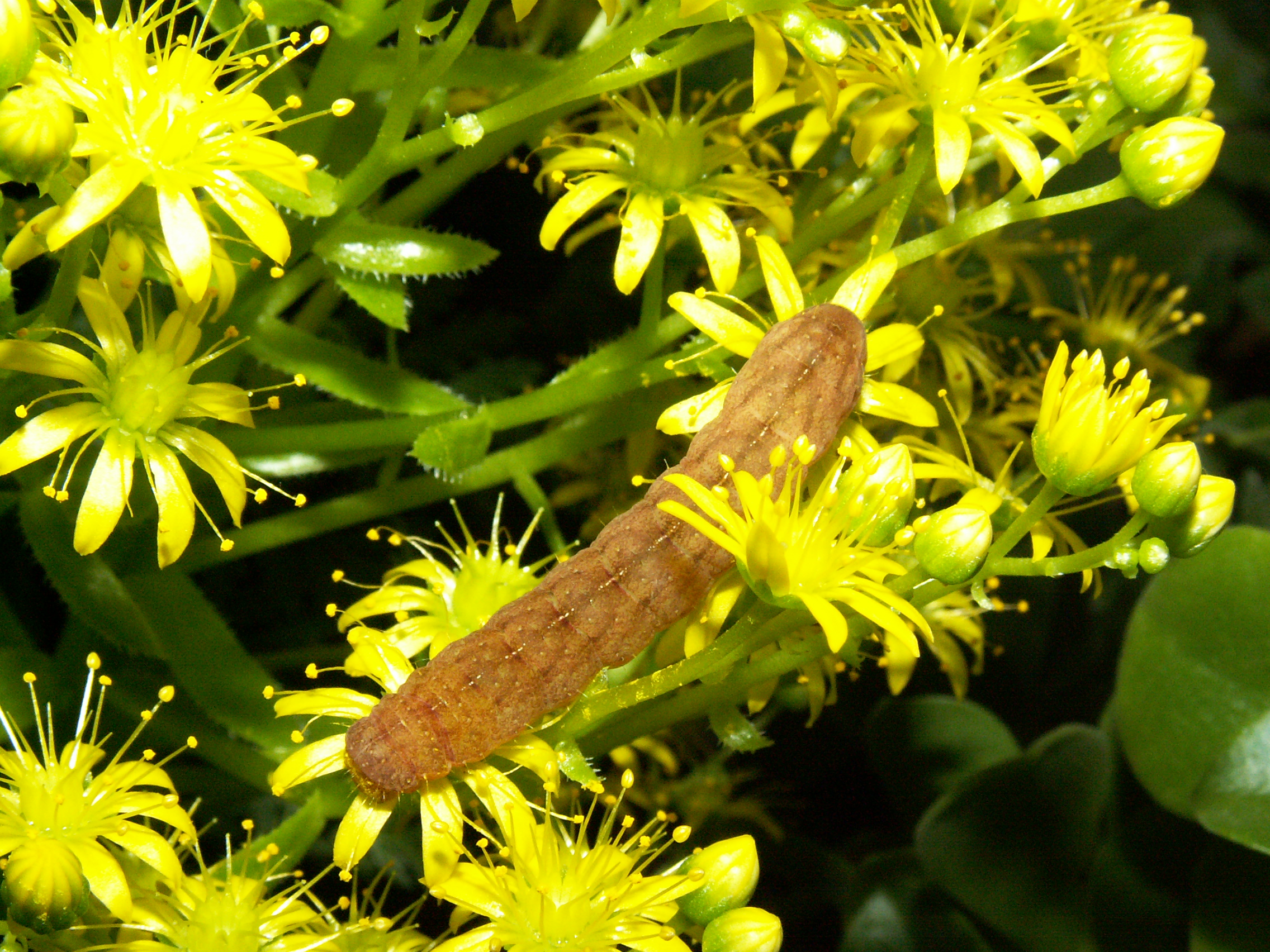
Caterpillar (brown variant) on Aeonium

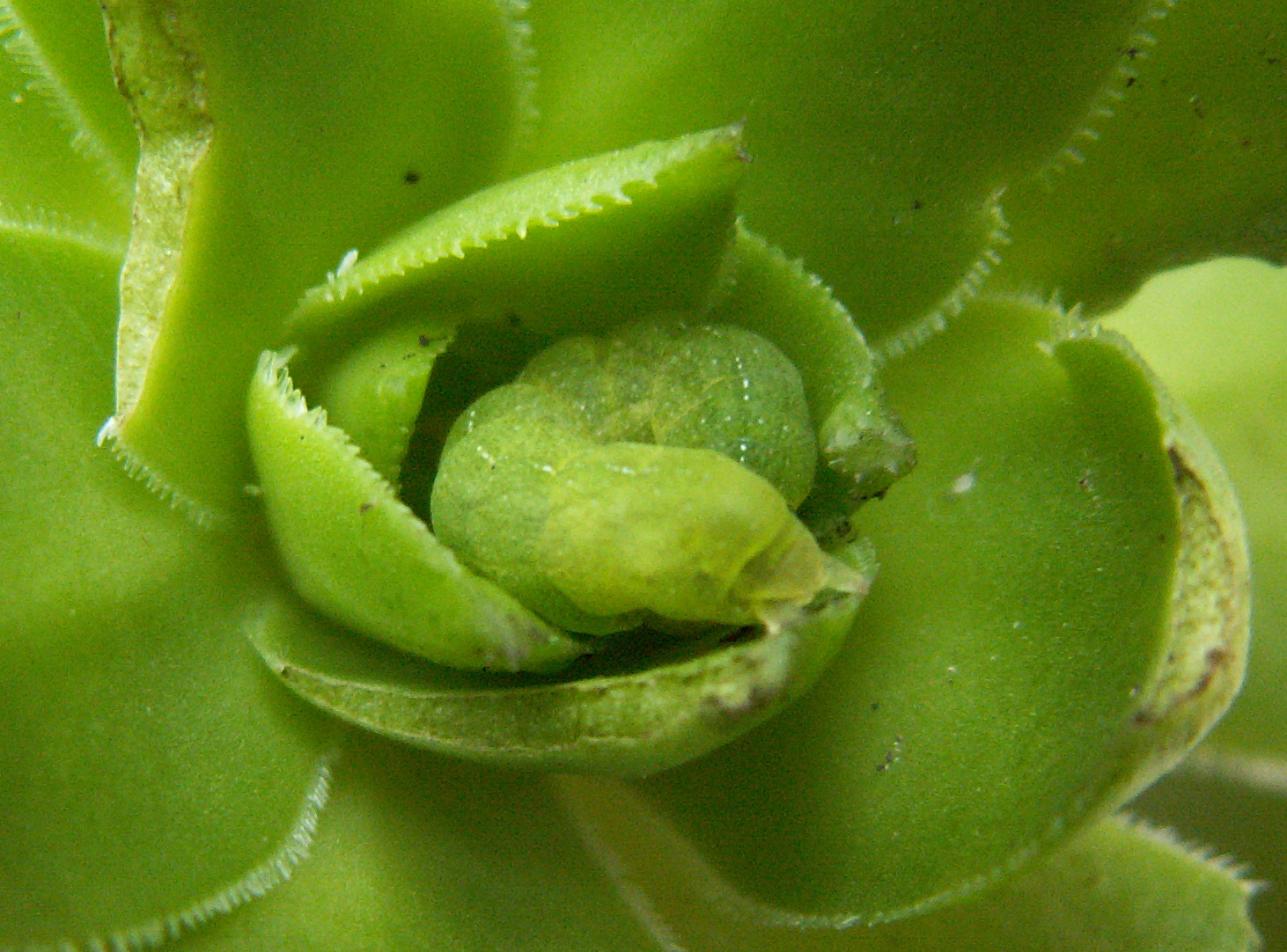
Caterpillar (green variant) on Aeonium

== Recorded food plants ==
- Aeonium
- Anemone
- Apium – celery
- Basil
- Beta – beet
- Betula – birch
- Brassica
- Broccoli
- Centranthus – red valerian
- Chrysanthemum
- Cynara – globe artichoke
- Dahlia
- Fragaria – strawberry
- Geranium
- Hedera – ivy
- Helianthus – sunflower
- Humulus – hop
- Lactuca – lettuce
- Lamium – deadnettle
- Malus – apple
- Nicotiana – tobacco
- Ocimum basilicum - basil
- Pelargonium
- Prunus
- Pyrus – pear
- Quercus – oak
- Rubus – bramble
- Rumex – dock
- Senecio
- Solanum
- Spinacia – spinach
- Stellaria
- Urtica – nettle
- Vicia
- Vitis – grape
- Mentha - mint

See Robinson, G. S. et al.
