= Chirosia filicis =

Scientific classification
- Domain: Eukaryota
- Kingdom: Animalia
- Phylum: Arthropoda
- Class: Insecta
- Order: Diptera
- Family: Anthomyiidae
- Subfamily: Anthomyiinae
- Tribe: Chirosiini
- Genus: Chirosia
- Species: C. filicis

Binomial name
- Chirosia filicis (Huckett, 1949)

Synonyms
- Hylemyia filicis Huckett, 1949

Species of fly

Chirosia filicis is a species of root-maggot flies in the family Anthomyiidae.
