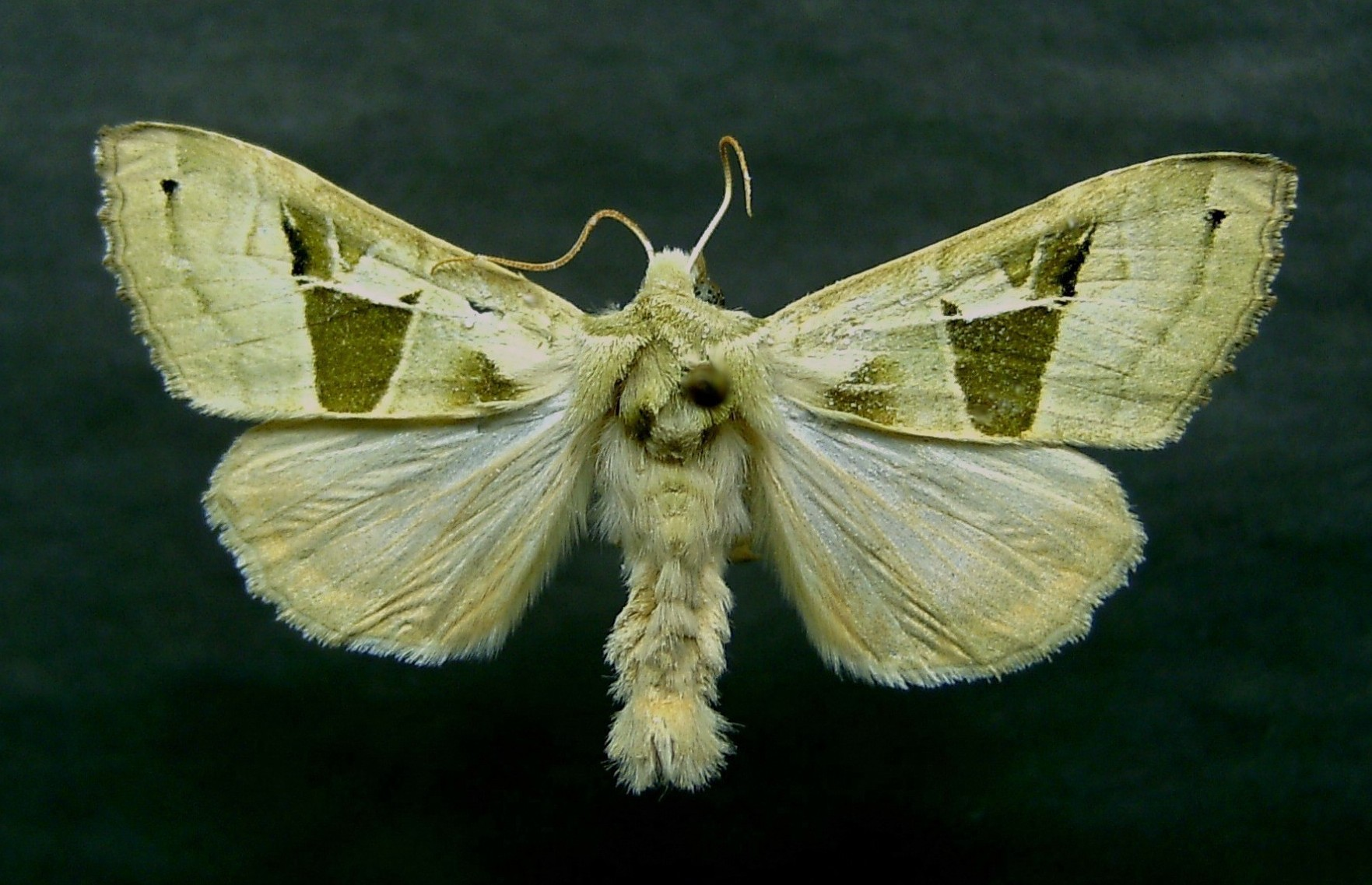

Scientific classification
- Domain: Eukaryota
- Kingdom: Animalia
- Phylum: Arthropoda
- Class: Insecta
- Order: Lepidoptera
- Superfamily: Noctuoidea
- Family: Noctuidae
- Genus: Phlogophora
- Species: P. scita

Binomial name
- Phlogophora scita (Hübner, 1790)

Synonyms
- Habrynthis scita; Phalaena scita

= Phlogophora scita =

Species of moth

Phlogophora scita is a moth of the family Noctuidae. It is found in most countries of continental Europe, from France to Belarus, Ukraine and Turkey, and from Germany and Poland to Italy and Greece In the Alps it is found up to heights of 1,600 meters.

The wingspan is 40–48 mm. The moth flies from June to September depending on the location.

The first stage larvae feed on various Ferns, including Dryopteris, Blechnum spicant and Pteridium aquilinum. They overwinter and feed on various plants in spring, including Viola, Plantago, Crataegus, Prunus spinosa, Rubus idaeus, and Quercus.
