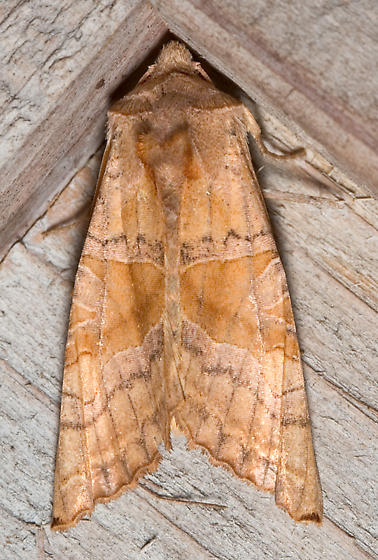

Scientific classification
- Kingdom: Animalia
- Phylum: Arthropoda
- Class: Insecta
- Order: Lepidoptera
- Superfamily: Noctuoidea
- Family: Noctuidae
- Genus: Phlogophora
- Species: P. periculosa

Binomial name
- Phlogophora periculosa Guenée, 1852

Synonyms
- Trigonophora v-brunneum Grote, 1875

= Phlogophora periculosa =

Species of moth

Phlogophora periculosa, the brown angle shades, is a moth of the family Noctuidae. It is found from coast to coast in the northern United States and southern Canada, south in the east to Georgia and Mississippi, south in the west to California (it is not present in Florida and the south-central states).

The wingspan is 42–50 mm. Adults are on wing from late July to October.

The larvae feed on the leaves of various woody plants, including alder, balsam fir, cranberry and plum.
