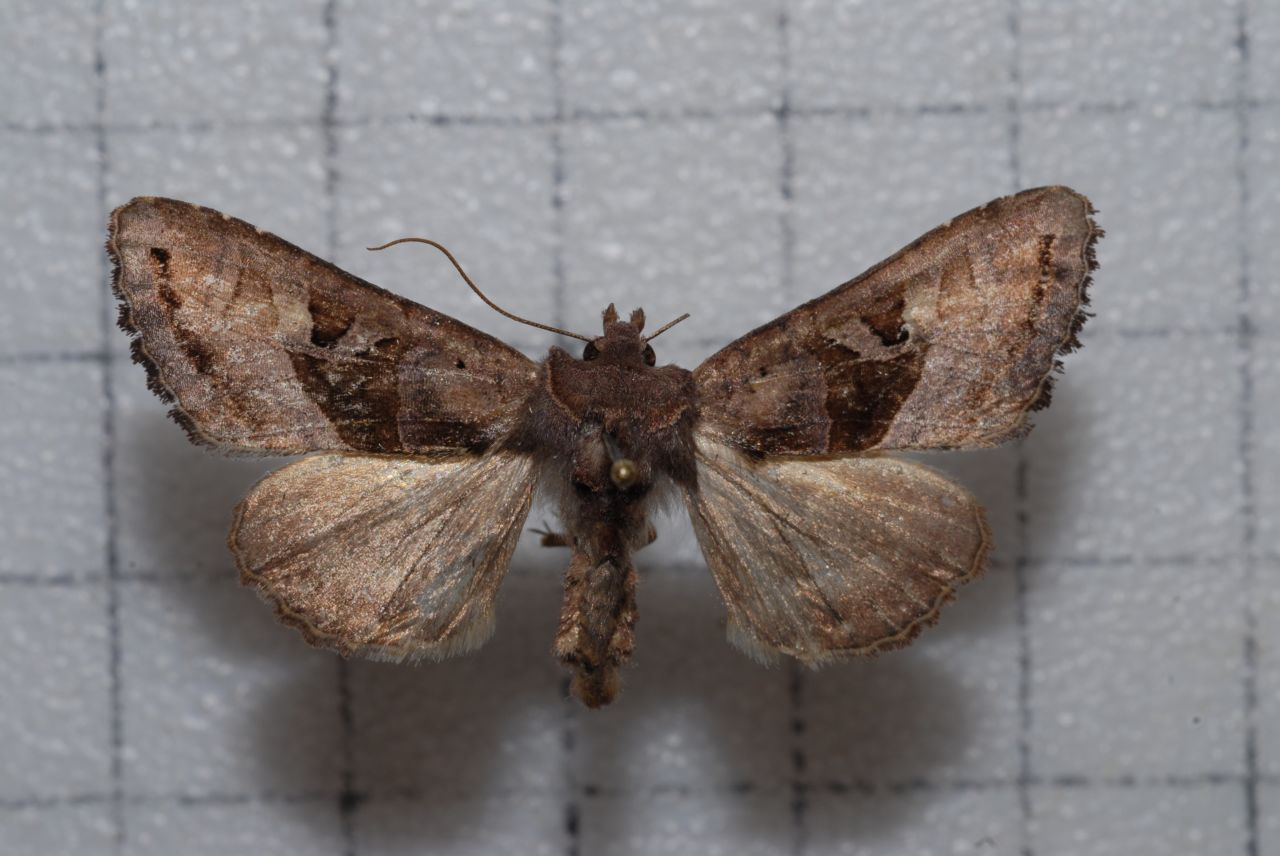

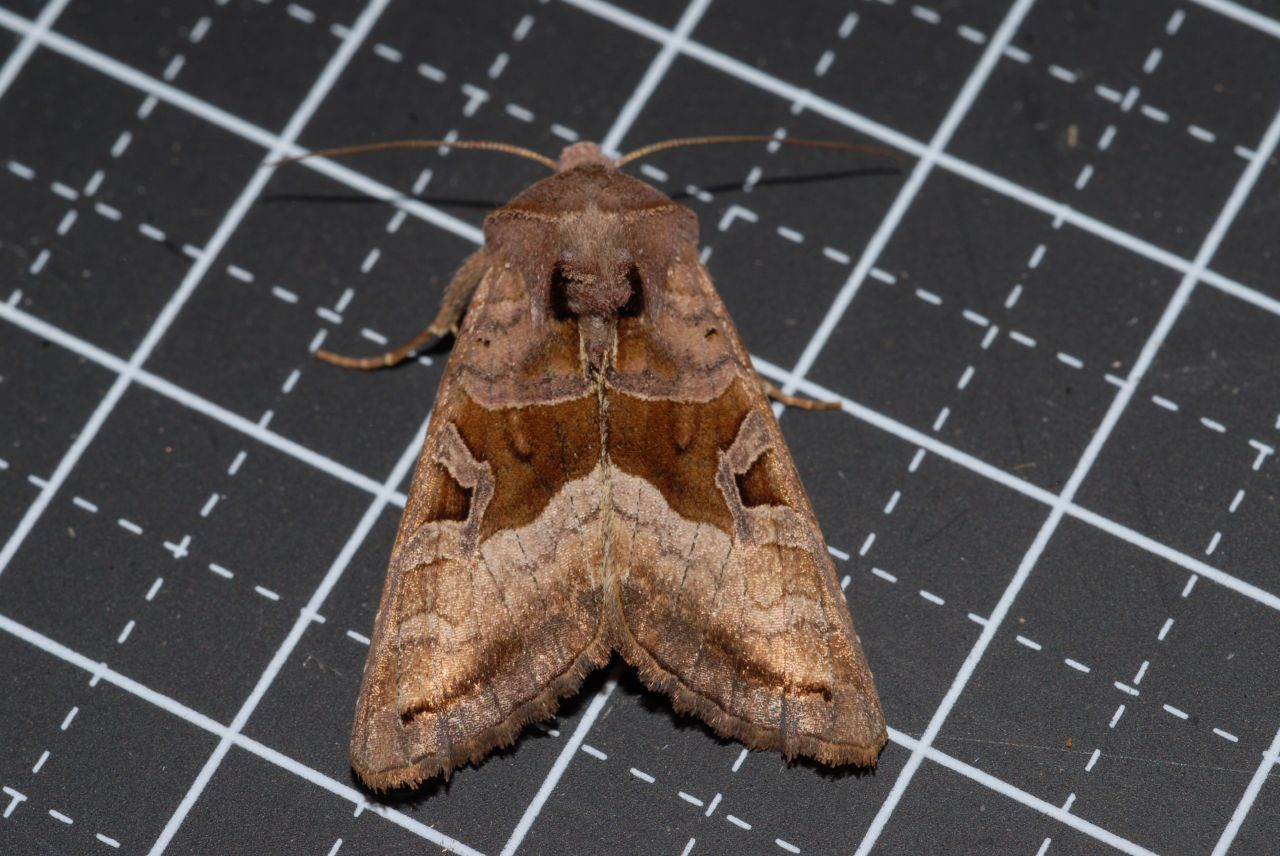

Scientific classification
- Kingdom: Animalia
- Phylum: Arthropoda
- Class: Insecta
- Order: Lepidoptera
- Superfamily: Noctuoidea
- Family: Noctuidae
- Genus: Phlogophora
- Species: P. conservuloides

Binomial name
- Phlogophora conservuloides (Hampson, 1898)

Synonyms
- Euplexia conservuloides Hampson, 1898

= Phlogophora conservuloides =

Species of moth

Phlogophora conservuloides is a species of moth of the family Noctuidae. It is found from Sikkim to Taiwan.
