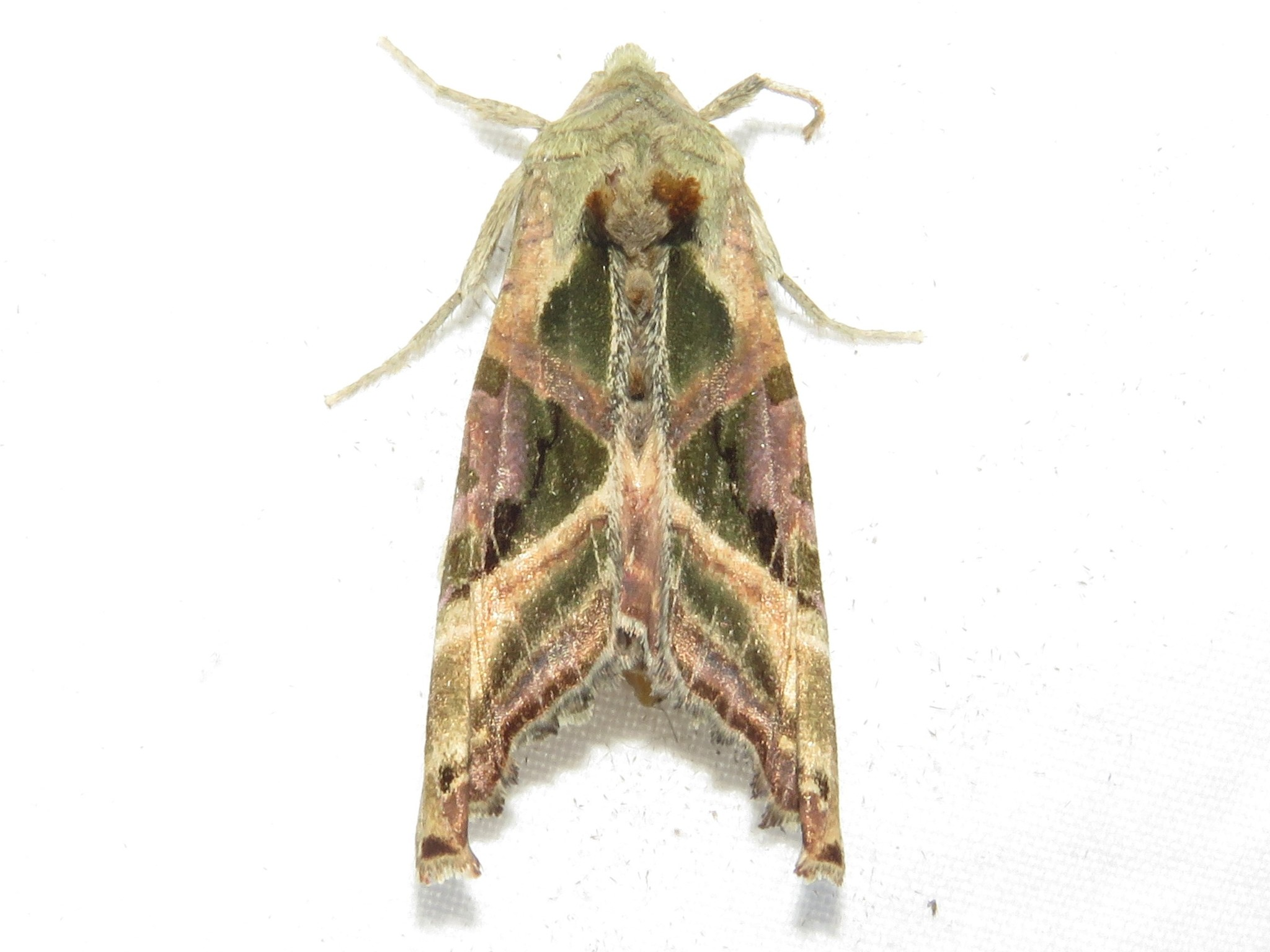

Scientific classification
- Domain: Eukaryota
- Kingdom: Animalia
- Phylum: Arthropoda
- Class: Insecta
- Order: Lepidoptera
- Superfamily: Noctuoidea
- Family: Noctuidae
- Tribe: Phlogophorini
- Genus: Phlogophora
- Species: P. iris

Binomial name
- Phlogophora iris Guenee, 1852

= Phlogophora iris =

Species of moth

Phlogophora iris, the olive angle shades, is a species of cutworm or dart moth in the family Noctuidae. It is found in North America.

The MONA or Hodges number for Phlogophora iris is 9546.
