= Zygophlebia eminens =

Conservation status
- Endangered (IUCN 3.1)

Scientific classification
- Kingdom: Plantae
- Clade: Tracheophytes
- Division: Polypodiophyta
- Class: Polypodiopsida
- Order: Polypodiales
- Suborder: Polypodiineae
- Family: Polypodiaceae
- Genus: Zygophlebia
- Species: Z. eminens

Binomial name
- Zygophlebia eminens (C.V.Morton) L.E.Bishop

Synonyms
- Enterosora eminens (C.V.Morton) comb. ined.; Grammitis eminens C.V.Morton

Species of fern

Zygophlebia eminens is a species of grammitid fern. It is endemic to Ecuador. Its natural habitats are subtropical or tropical moist montane forests and subtropical or tropical high-elevation grassland. It is threatened by habitat loss. Its veins are more regularly free than any other Zygophlebia species besides Zygophlebia dudleyi, though some veins may be forked or fused.

All Zygophlebia species are placed in the genus Enterosora by the Checklist of Ferns and Lycophytes of the World, which treats this species as Enterosora eminens. However, the checklist does not give an authority for the transfer, implying the name has not been formally published.
