= Dasygrammitis =

Scientific classification
- Kingdom: Plantae
- Clade: Tracheophytes
- Division: Polypodiophyta
- Class: Polypodiopsida
- Order: Polypodiales
- Suborder: Polypodiineae
- Family: Polypodiaceae
- Subfamily: Grammitidoideae
- Genus: Dasygrammitis; Parris

Type species
- Dasygrammitis mollicoma (Nees & Blume) Parris

Genus of ferns

Dasygrammitis is a genus of ferns in the family Polypodiaceae, subfamily Grammitidoideae, according to the Pteridophyte Phylogeny Group classification of 2016 (PPG I). It is known from Sri Lanka through southeast Asia and the Philippines to Polynesia.

== Description ==
The rhizomes are radially symmetric (without distinct upper and lower surfaces) and bear whorls of stipes, which lack a joint at the point of attachment. The rhizome scales are red-brown, of uniform color, and usually glossy. They have unbranched, red-brown hairs on their edges.

Hairs, where present, are unbranched and branched, and brown in color. The leaf blades are usually pinnate in cutting, rarely pinnatifid or bipinnatifid, bearing free veins which lack hydathodes at their terminus. Sori are borne in two rows beneath pinnae or lobes. The sori are circular to elliptic in shape; the sporangia either lack hairs or have one to two red-brown hairs.

== Taxonomy ==
The genus was first described by Barbara Parris in 2007 to receive some of the species of the genus Grammitis, which as then circumscribed was artificial and contained a number of disparate lineages. The name "Dasygrammitis" means "shaggy Grammitis", referring to the shaggy hairs often present on the frond in this group of former Grammitis species. Parris initially placed six species in the genus.

A phylogenetic study of the grammitids found that Dasygrammitis was sister to a clade consisting of Calymmodon, Micropolypodium, Scleroglossum, Tomophyllum, and Xiphopterella. These six genera share a radially symmetric rhizome, which may be a synapomorphy for this clade (although the trait appears in other grammitid taxa, probably independently).

=== Species ===
As of October 2025, the Checklist of Ferns and Lycophytes of the World accepted the following eight species:

- Dasygrammitis brevivenosa (Alderw.) Parris
- Dasygrammitis crassifrons (Baker) Parris
- Dasygrammitis fuscata (Blume) Parris
- Dasygrammitis kinabaluensis Parris, sp. ined.
- Dasygrammitis malaccana (Baker) Parris
- Dasygrammitis mollicoma (Nees & Blume) Parris
- Dasygrammitis purpurascens (Nadeaud) Parris
- Dasygrammitis seramensis Parris, sp. ined.
