= Leucotrichum =

Scientific classification
- Kingdom: Plantae
- Clade: Tracheophytes
- Division: Polypodiophyta
- Class: Polypodiopsida
- Order: Polypodiales
- Suborder: Polypodiineae
- Family: Polypodiaceae
- Subfamily: Grammitidoideae
- Genus: Leucotrichum; Labiak

Type species
- Leucotrichum organense (Gardner) Labiak

Species
- See text.

Genus of ferns

Leucotrichum is a genus of ferns in the family Polypodiaceae, subfamily Grammitidoideae, according to the Pteridophyte Phylogeny Group classification of 2016 (PPG I). It is one of about 26 genera of "grammitids". The name of the genus refers to the white hairs that are usually present on the underside of the frond.

== Taxonomy ==
Leucotrichum was established in 2010 and has about six currently recognized species. The type species for the genus is Leucotrichum organense. Four of the species had been in Lellingeria, and one, Leucotrichum mortonii, had been in the defunct genus Xiphopteris.

In 2004, a phylogenetic study of DNA sequences of grammitids showed that a few species of Lellingeria are not closely related to the others. They are sister to a clade of 26 species which at that time were in the genus Terpsichore. This was confirmed six years later in another molecular phylogenetic study on the grammitids. In 2010, four species from Lellingeria and one from Xiphopteris were transferred to the new genus Leucotrichum. The clade of 26 species that is sister to Leucotrichum was named as a new genus, Alansmia, in 2011.

=== Species ===
As of April 2025, the Checklist of Ferns and Lycophytes of the World accepted the following six species:

- Leucotrichum madagascariense Rakotondr. & Rouhan
- Leucotrichum mitchelliae (Baker) Labiak
- Leucotrichum mortonii (Copel.) Labiak
- Leucotrichum organense (Gardner) Labiak
- Leucotrichum pseudomitchelliae (Lellinger) Labiak
- Leucotrichum schenckii (Hieron.) Labiak

== Distribution ==
Leucotrichum has a disjunct distribution. Leucotrichum organense and Leucotrichum schenckii are endemic to the Atlantic moist forests of coastal southeastern Brazil. Leucotrichum mortonii is known only from Cuba and the Dominican Republic. Leucotrichum pseudomitchellae occurs in Costa Rica and Panama. Leucotrichum mitchellae ranges through Mexico, Central America, and the Caribbean. Leucotrichum madagascariense occurs in Madagascar.
