= Moranopteris aphelolepis =

Conservation status
- Vulnerable (IUCN 3.1)

Scientific classification
- Kingdom: Plantae
- Clade: Tracheophytes
- Division: Polypodiophyta
- Class: Polypodiopsida
- Order: Polypodiales
- Suborder: Polypodiineae
- Family: Polypodiaceae
- Genus: Moranopteris
- Species: M. aphelolepis

Binomial name
- Moranopteris aphelolepis (C.V.Morton) R.Y.Hirai & J.Prado

Synonyms
- Micropolypodium aphelolepis (C.V.Morton) A.R.Sm.

Species of fern

Moranopteris aphelolepis is a species of grammitid fern in the family Polypodiaceae. It is endemic to the Andes Mountains, in Colombia, Ecuador and Bolivia. Its natural habitat is subtropical or tropical moist montane forests. It is threatened by habitat loss.
