= Ctenopterella =

Scientific classification
- Kingdom: Plantae
- Clade: Tracheophytes
- Division: Polypodiophyta
- Class: Polypodiopsida
- Order: Polypodiales
- Suborder: Polypodiineae
- Family: Polypodiaceae
- Subfamily: Grammitidoideae
- Genus: Ctenopterella; Parris

Type species
- Ctenopterella blechnoides (Grev.) Parris

Genus of ferns

Ctenopterella is a genus of ferns in the family Polypodiaceae, subfamily Grammitidoideae, according to the Pteridophyte Phylogeny Group classification of 2016 (PPG I). It is known from Africa through southeast Asia and Oceania to Polynesia.

== Description ==
The rhizomes are dorsiventral (having upper and lower surfaces clearly distinct in appearance), and bear two rows of stipes, which sometimes have distinct joints where they attach. Distinct phyllopodia are present in some below the joint. The rhizome scales are brown, glabrous, and dull to glossy.

Hairs, where present, are unbranched and branched, from whitish to brown in color. The leaf blades range from pinnatifid to pinnate-pinnatifid in cutting, bearing free veins which usually end in hydathodes on the upper surface of the leaf. Sori are borne beneath pinnae or lobes, sometimes slightly sunken into the leaf tissue, usually in two rows but rarely in one. The sori are circular to elliptic in shape; the sporangia lack hairs.

== Taxonomy ==
The genus was first described by Barbara Parris in 2007 to receive some of the species of the polyphyletic genus Ctenopteris; Ctenopterella is a diminutive form of that name. She initially placed twelve species in the genus. In 2013, she described a new species, Ctenopterella gabonensis, from the Monts Doudou in Gabon, and transferred a Vietnamese species, Ctenopterella nhatrangensis, into the genus. In 2015, she transferred three more species from Ctenopteris, including one she had formerly placed in synonymy, in preparation for a monograph on the genus.

As of August 2014, the only phylogenetic study so far to include any Ctenopterella species sampled Ctenopterella denticulata only. It found that this species, Acrosorus friderici-et-pauli (the type of its genus), and Grammitis stenophylla form a clade sister to the combined clade of Oreogrammitis, Prosaptia, Radiogrammitis, and Themelium. None of the three taxa in the first clade are particularly close morphologically. Ctenopterella denticulata has since been transferred to the genus Oxygrammitis as Oxygrammitis denticulata. In addition to Oxygrammitis, other species have been transferred to Boonkerdia and Rouhania.

== Species ==
As of November 2025, the Checklist of Ferns and Lycophytes of the World accepted the following ten species:

- Ctenopterella blechnoides (Grev.) Parris
- Ctenopterella gordonii (S.B.Andrews) Parris
- Ctenopterella khaoluangensis (Tagawa & K.Iwats.) Parris
- Ctenopterella lasiostipes (Mett.) Parris
- Ctenopterella lepida (Brause) Parris
- Ctenopterella nhatrangensis (C.Chr. & Tardieu) Parris
- Ctenopterella pacifica Parris
- Ctenopterella pediculata (Baker) Parris
- Ctenopterella rivularis Parris
- Ctenopterella seemannii (J.Sm.) Parris
- Ctenopterella vodonaivalui (Brownlie) Parris
