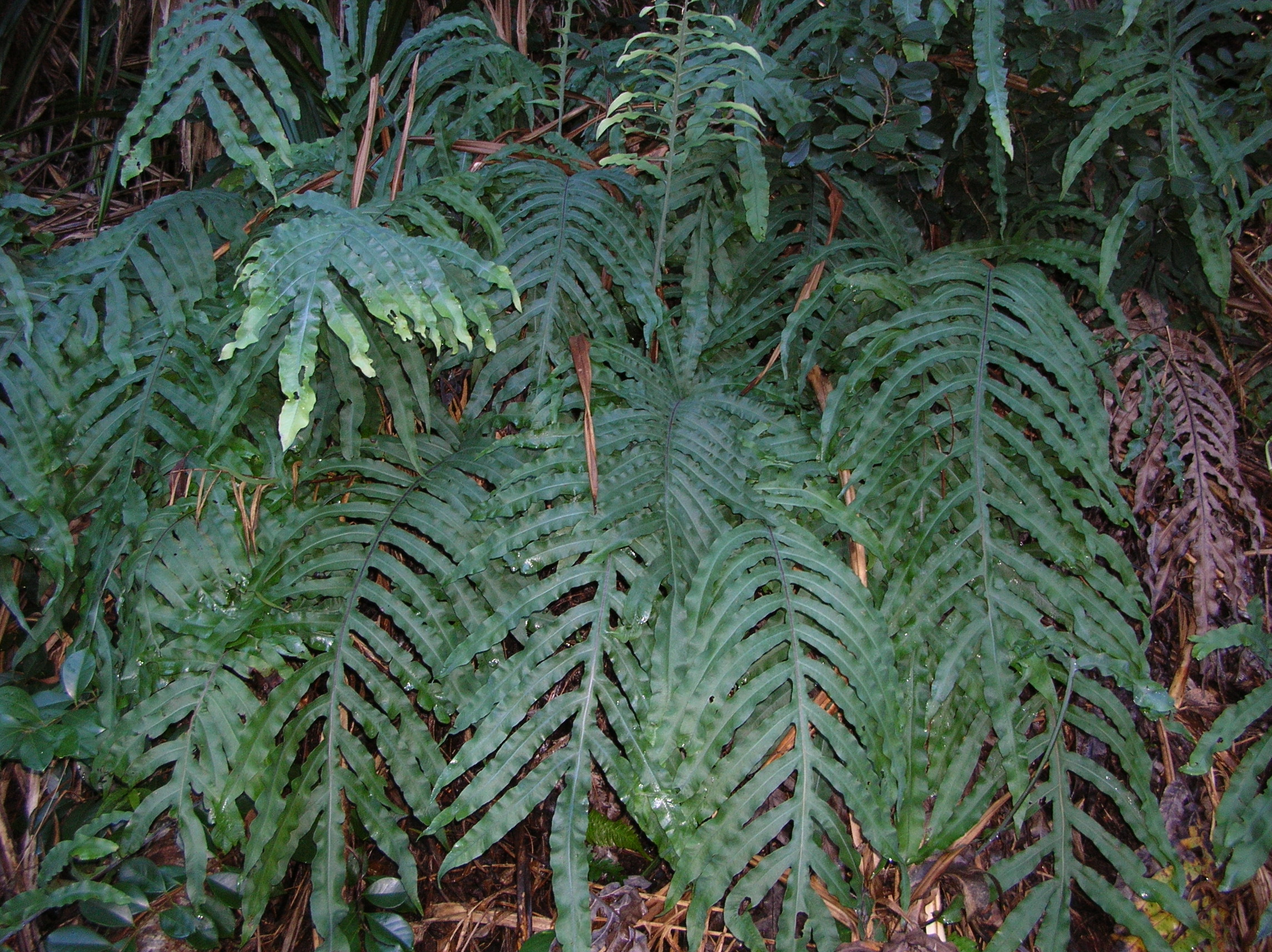

Conservation status
- Secure (NatureServe)

Scientific classification
- Kingdom: Plantae
- Clade: Embryophytes
- Clade: Tracheophytes
- Division: Polypodiophyta
- Class: Polypodiopsida
- Order: Polypodiales
- Suborder: Polypodiineae
- Family: Polypodiaceae
- Genus: Phlebodium
- Species: P. aureum

Binomial name
- Phlebodium aureum (L.) J.Sm.

Synonyms
- Polypodium aureum L.

= Phlebodium aureum =

Species of fern

Phlebodium aureum (golden polypody, golden serpent fern, cabbage palm fern, gold-foot fern, blue-star fern, hare-foot fern; syn. Polypodium aureum, Polypodium leucotomos) is an epiphytic fern native to tropical and subtropical regions of the Americas.

== Description ==
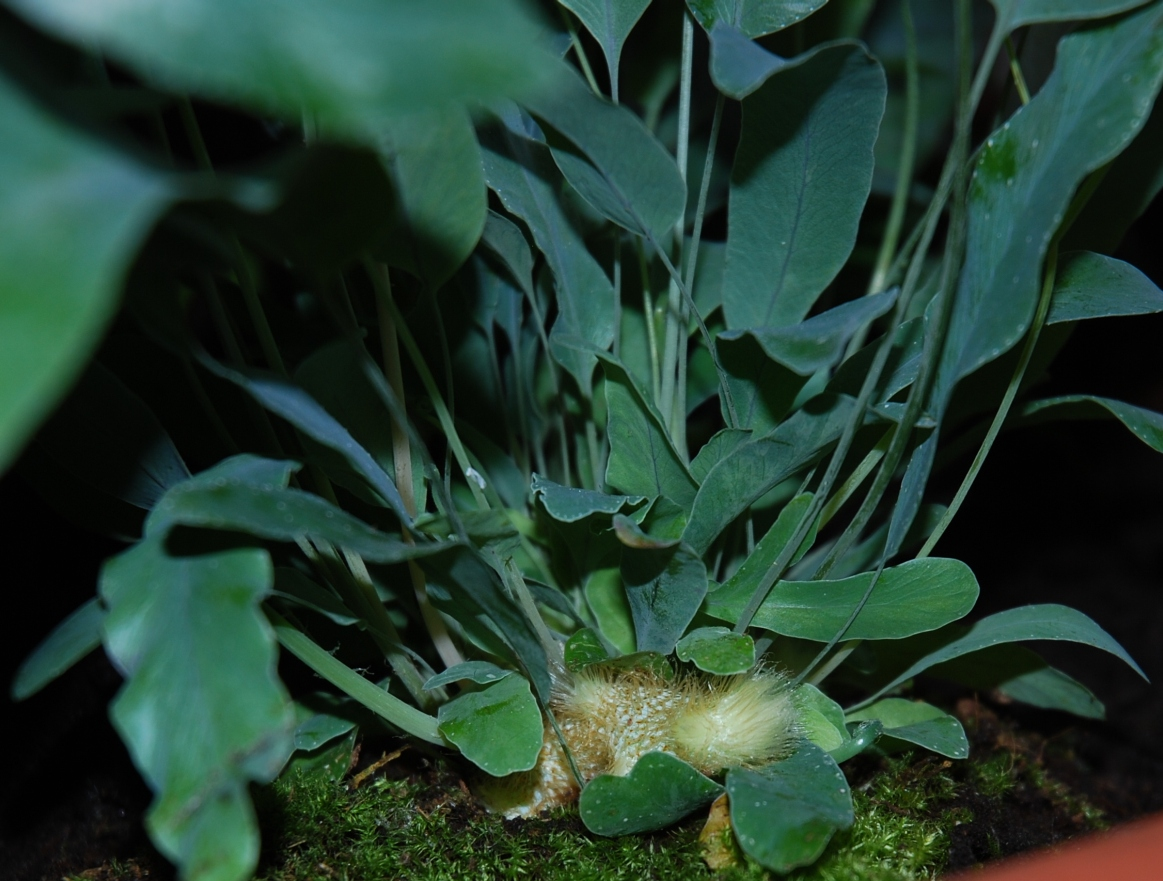
Leaves on a young plant

It is a rhizomatous fern, with the creeping rhizome 8–15 mm (rarely 30 mm) in diameter, densely covered in the golden-brown scales that give the species its name. The fronds are large and pinnatifid (deeply lobed), from 30 to 130 cm long and 10–50 cm broad, with up to 35 pinnae; they vary in color from bright green to glaucous green and have undulate margins. Several round sori run along each side of the pinna midrib, and the minute spores are wind-dispersed. The fronds are evergreen in areas with year-round rainfall, semi-evergreen or briefly deciduous in areas with a marked dry season.

== Taxonomy ==
Phlebodium aureum is a member of a very small, and recently discovered genus. It was split from the genus Polypodium, and the split is still apparent in the multitude of synonyms available for Phlebodium aureum. Phlebodium is one of the 178 genera in the family Polypodiaceae. Additionally, the family Polypodiaceae is broken into a number of subfamilies, with Phlebodium a member of the non-grammatid tribe within the subfamily Polypodioideae. Members of the non-grammatids in this subfamily include the genera Phlebodium as well as Polypodium, from which Phlebodium is derived and which most likely is its closest relative. Other members include Pecluma, Pleopeltis, Microgramma, and Pleurosoriopsis. A bootstrapping technique proves that, at a 90% confidence level, the polypodiaceous ferns form a sister relationship with tree ferns. However, further phylogenetic studies need to be conducted regarding the current status of the genus, and which of the species are the most related.

The genus Phlebodium is exemplified by containing rows of areoles that lack included veins, and each sorus served by two different veins. Correll and Correll, two authors responsible for thirty years of classification since Flora was introduced in 1982, documented Phlebodium aureum as Polypodium aureum as recently as 1982. However, this creation of the new genera is warranted based on some notable differences. For instance, Giudice et al. point out that the sori on Phlebodium are more smooth and rounded when compared to other groups within the family Polypodiaceae. Additionally, studies on spores and size of the mature plant prove that Phlebodium contrasts severely from the rest of its family, providing the creation of the genera. The division of genera within the Polypodiaceae is fairly gray, considering that systematically, gametophytes differ only very slightly amongst different genera.

Members of the family Polypodiaceae are most closely related to the Davalliaceae, with further relationships noted to Oleandraceae, Tectariaceae, and the Lomariopsidaceae within the order Polypodiales, which contains 80% of today's ferns species (see additional page for picture). The order arose and diversified about 100 million years ago, and are regarded as one of the most evolutionarily advanced orders of ferns.

== Distribution ==
It is confined to the eastern side of the Americas and the Caribbean, ranging from the extreme southeast of the US state of Georgia and south into Florida. It is also found in the Bahamas, on Puerto Rico, Hispaniola, and the Lesser Antilles, as well as coastal regions of Caribbean and Atlantic South America, including Venezuela, Brazil, Suriname, French Guiana, Guyana, and Paraguay. It is the only species of Phlebodium found in North America or on Caribbean islands; all other species are endemic to South America.

== Habitat ==
This fern is rarely terrestrial in habitat, usually colonizing the canopies of tropical rainforests and the dwarf palms of subtropical forests. It is common in the cloud forests of the Caribbean and northern South America. It grows in varied habitats in Florida, including swamps and hammocks, and can thus apparently tolerate a wide range of microclimates. Its restriction to the tropics and subtropics is readily explained by its intolerance of anything other than very brief, light frosts. High levels of light are also critical for the growth of this species.

== Cultivation and uses ==
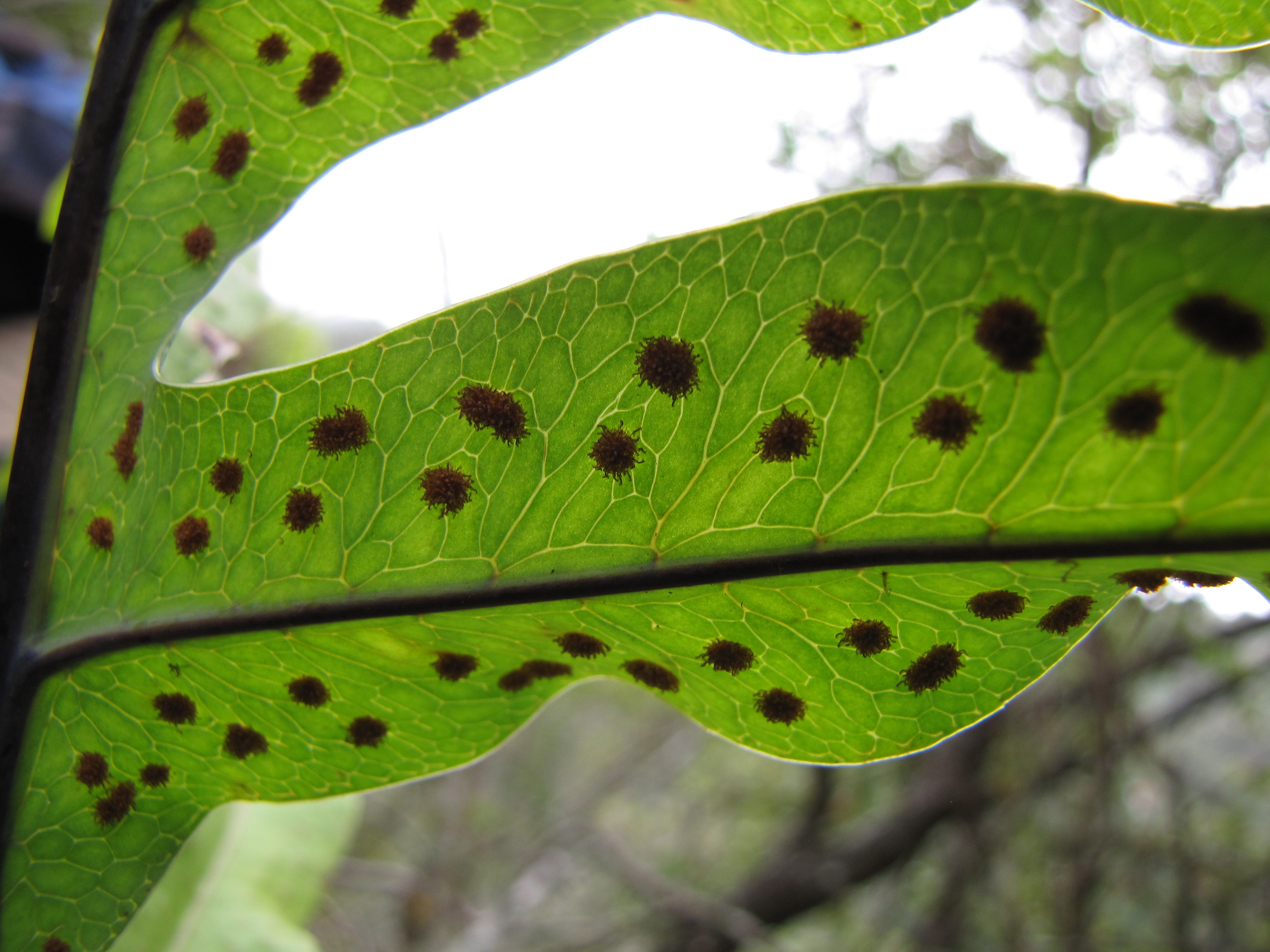
Spores

Phlebodium aureum is well-adapted to cultivation and is valued both as an ornamental plant and in herbal medicine.

It can be cultivated in greenhouses in non-tropical climates if night temperatures do not fall below about 5 °C. Several cultivars have been selected for garden planting, with varying leaf color from grey-green to silver-green to blue-green, or with cristate or very wavy frond margins.

Phlebodium aureum 'Blue Star' has silvery blue-green finger shaped leaves. As a houseplant it can be placed in low to moderate light areas, avoiding direct sunlight that can damage leaves. It is recommended to provide indirect watering and allow slight drying between waterings since standing water can damage the rhizomes. Humid areas of the house are favorable, such as kitchens and bathrooms, if they have enough light. As a more tropical plant, Phlebodium aureum grows best in temperatures between 16–24 °C (61–75 °F) and does not do well in cold temperatures. Most care problems are brought on by improper watering practices.

=== Medicine ===
Decoctions have been used as a panacea in Central American folk medicine. These tonics were prescribed for a multitude of ailments, ranging from asthma to heart disease. Modern medicine has also investigated P. aureum, often using the deprecated synonym Polypodium leucotomos.

Oral consumption of Polypodium leucotomos extract has also been studied for the treatment of dermatologic disorders including melasma, vitiligo, psoriasis, polymorphous light eruption, atopic dermatitis, postinflammatory hyperpigmentation, photoaging and skin cancer.

Oral consumption of Polypodium leucotomos extract has been shown to protect the skin from ultraviolet light damage. Clinical studies have shown that Polypodium leucotomos extract provides photoprotection against the effects of both UVB and UVA light. A review of 19 human and 6 basic scientific studies showed that Polypodium leucotomos was well tolerated with a favorable side effect profile. Consequently, Polypodium leucotomos supplementation has been posited as an adjunct photoprotection strategy in combination with traditional UV filters, such as sunscreen.
