= Moranopteris inaccessa =

Scientific classification
- Kingdom: Plantae
- Clade: Tracheophytes
- Division: Polypodiophyta
- Class: Polypodiopsida
- Order: Polypodiales
- Suborder: Polypodiineae
- Family: Polypodiaceae
- Genus: Moranopteris
- Species: M. inaccessa

Binomial name
- Moranopteris inaccessa Sundue & S.P.Sylvester

Species of fern

Moranopteris inaccessa is a grammitid fern first collected in 2012 from the ledge of a cliff in Abra Málaga, at the junction of the Vilcabamba and Urubamba mountain ranges of Peru. Vegetation on those ledges may represent the flora of the Puna grasslands prior to human disturbance. Fronds of this species are pinnate-pinnatifid, with pinnate veins; this is unusual for Moranopteris, as members of the genus generally have less deeply cut fronds and grow on trees rather than rocks.
