= Acrosorus friderici-et-pauli =

Scientific classification
- Kingdom: Plantae
- Clade: Tracheophytes
- Division: Polypodiophyta
- Class: Polypodiopsida
- Order: Polypodiales
- Suborder: Polypodiineae
- Family: Polypodiaceae
- Genus: Acrosorus
- Species: A. friderici-et-pauli

Binomial name
- Acrosorus friderici-et-pauli (Christ) Parris

Synonyms
- Acrosorus exaltata (Copel.) Copel.; Acrosorus merrillii Copel., nom. illeg., non Polypodium merrillii Copel. (1905); Acrosorus symmetricus Copel.; Acrosorus triangularis (Scort.ex Bedd.) Copel.; Davallia exaltata Copel.; Davallia friderici-et-pauli Christ; Davallia merrillii (Copel.) C.Chr.; Polypodium exaltatum (Copel.) Alderw.; Polypodium friderici-et-pauli Christ (1904), non Christ(1896); Polypodium sarasinorum Alderw.; Polypodium tortile Alderw.; Polypodium triangulare Scort.ex Bedd., nom. illeg; Polypodium wawoense Brause; Prosaptia friederici-et-pauli (Christ) Christ

Species of fern

Acrosorus friderici-et-pauli is a species of fern in the family Polypodiaceae, subfamily Grammitidoideae, according to the Pteridophyte Phylogeny Group classification of 2016 (PPG I). It is native to Thailand, peninsular Malaysia, Vietnam, the Philippines, Borneo, the Moluccas, Sulawesi and New Guinea.

== Taxonomy ==
Konrad H. Christ first described this species in 1895, under the name Davallia friderici-et-pauli. This is the basionym of the accepted name Acrosorus friderici-et-pauli, published by Edwin Copeland in 1906. Christ later caused some confusion over the use of the epithet friderici-et-pauli. In 1896, he published the name Polypodium friderici-et-pauli for a different species. This is the basionym of the accepted name Archigrammitis friderici-et-pauli, published by Barbara S. Parris in 2013. In 1904, Christ again published the name Polypodium friderici-et-pauli, this time making reference to Davallia. Hence Polypodium friderici-et-pauli Christ (1904) is an illegitimate synonym of this species, Acrosorus friderici-et-pauli, and not of Archigrammitis friderici-et-pauli.
