= Xiphopteris =

Genus of ferns

Xiphopteris is a defunct genus of ferns in the family Polypodiaceae. The name is derived from two Greek words: xiphos, "sword", and pteris, "fern".

The name "Xiphopteris" can no longer be used because its type species, Xiphopteris serrulata has been transferred to Cochlidium. Because Xiphopteris is polyphyletic, some of its species were not transferred to Cochlidium with the type species. For these, the name Xiphopteris has been used provisionally, pending their reassignment to other genera.
