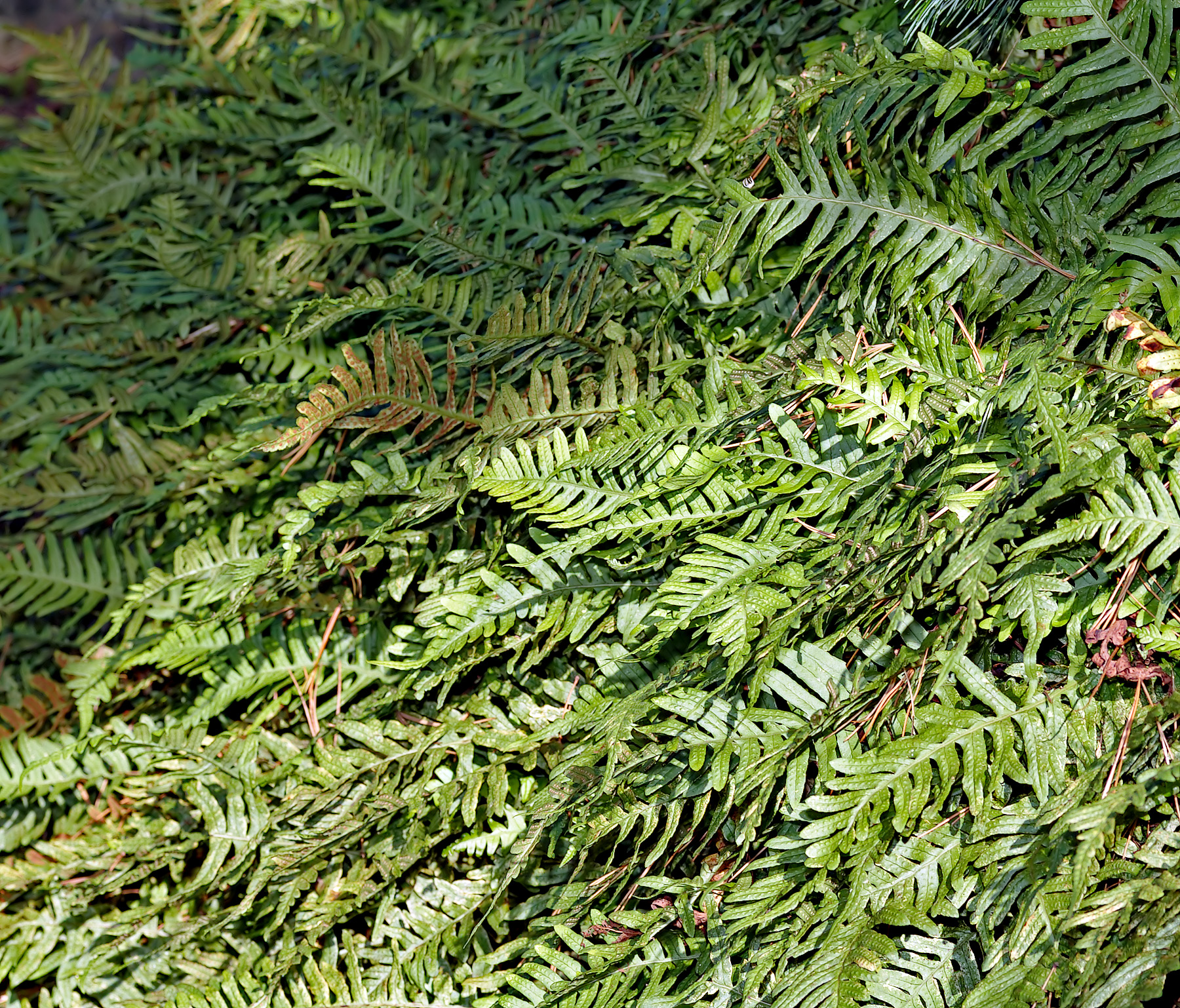
- Common polypody, Polypodium vulgare

Scientific classification
- Kingdom: Plantae
- Clade: Tracheophytes
- Division: Polypodiophyta
- Class: Polypodiopsida
- Order: Polypodiales
- Suborder: Polypodiineae
- Family: Polypodiaceae
- Subfamily: Polypodioideae; B.K.Nayar 1970

Genera
- See text.

= Polypodioideae =

Subfamily of ferns

Polypodioideae is a subfamily belonging to the fern family Polypodiaceae, which is a member of the suborder Polypodiineae in the Pteridophyte Phylogeny Group classification of 2016 (PPG I). Alternatively, the subfamily may be treated as the tribe Polypodieae within a very broadly defined family Polypodiaceae sensu lato.

== Taxonomy ==
Two very different circumscriptions of the subfamily were in use as of 2019. In the first, such as the Pteridophyte Phylogeny Group classification of 2016 (PPG I) used here, the subfamily Polypodioideae is one of a number of subfamilies of the family Polypodiaceae which is part of the suborder Polypodiineae. In the second, the whole of the suborder is placed in a very broadly defined Polypodiaceae sensu lato, in which the subfamily Polypodioideae sensu lato is equivalent to the family Polypodiaceae and the tribe Polypodieae to the subfamily Polypodioideae. The equivalence is shown in the following table.

PPG I	Christenhusz & Chase (2014)
Suborder Polypodiineae Dumort.	Family Polypodiaceae J.Presl & C.Presl
Family Polypodiaceae J.Presl & C.Presl	Subfamily Polypodioideae B.K.Nayar
Subfamily Polypodioideae J.Presl & C.Presl	Tribe Polypodieae Hook. & Lindl. ex Duby

=== History ===
Mabberley, in 2008, defined this subfamily in a very broad sense, including all of Polypodiaceae except for the Platycerioideae (Platycerium and Pyrrosia) and the grammitid ferns, which he placed in Grammitidaceae. His tribe Polypodieae corresponded to Polypodioideae in the sense of PPG I.

Christenhusz et al., in 2011, incorporated phylogenetic evidence to recircumscribe the subfamily, combining the grammitids with Mabberley's Polypodieae (recognizing a number of segregate genera). The classification of Christenhusz and Chase in 2014 vastly expanded the circumscription of Polypodiaceae, redefined Polypodioideae be what had been theretofore recognized as Polypodiaceae, including the grammitids. The tribe Polypodieae corresponded to the subfamily Polypodioideae in Christenhusz et al.

The most recent circumscription of the subfamily, the PPG I classification, largely returns to that of Christenhusz et al., but excludes the grammitids as subfamily Grammitidoideae, rendering the Polypodioideae potentially paraphyletic.

== Phylogeny ==
The following phylogram shows a likely relationship between Polypodioideae and the other subfamilies within Polypodiaceae, based on groups described by Schuettpelz & Pryer, 2008, using the subfamily names of PPG I.

- Polypodiaceae
  - Loxogrammoideae
  - - - Drynarioideae
      - - Platycerioideae
        - Microsoroideae
    - - "non-grammitid" = Polypodioideae
      - "grammitid" ferns = Grammitidoideae

== Genera ==
The Pteridophyte Phylogeny Group classification of 2016 (PPG I) recognizes the following genera:

- Campyloneurum C.Presl
- Microgramma C.Presl
- Niphidium J.Sm.
- Pecluma M.G.Price.
- Phlebodium (R.Br.) J.Sm.
- Pleopeltis Humb. & Bonpl. ex Willd.
- Pleurosoriopsis Fomin
- Polypodium L. Perhaps
- Serpocaulon A.R.Sm.
