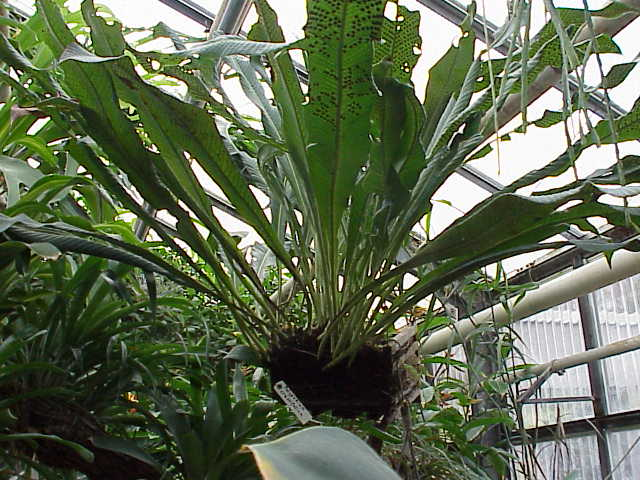
- Fertile Niphidium crassifolium cultivated in a greenhouse

Scientific classification
- Kingdom: Plantae
- Clade: Tracheophytes
- Division: Polypodiophyta
- Class: Polypodiopsida
- Order: Polypodiales
- Suborder: Polypodiineae
- Family: Polypodiaceae
- Genus: Niphidium
- Species: N. crassifolium

Binomial name
- Niphidium crassifolium (L.) Lellinger

Synonyms
- Anaxetum crassifolium (L.) Schott; Dipteris crassifolia (L.) J. Sm. Drynaria crassifolia (L.) J. Sm. Pessopteris crassifolia (L.) Underw. & Maxon; Phymatodes crassifolia (L.) C.Presl; Pleopeltis crassifolia (L.) T. Moore; Pleuridium angustum Fée; Pleuridium crassifolium (L.) Fée; Polypodium coriaceum Raddi; Polypodium crassifolium L. Polypodium porrectum Willd.

= Niphidium crassifolium =

Species of fern

Niphidium crassifolium, commonly known as the graceful fern, is a species of fern in the family Polypodiaceae found in Central and South America. It is predominantly epiphytic, growing on other plants—for example, in the canopies of trees—but occasionally grows on rocks or on the ground, particularly at higher altitude. It has a rhizome from which many fine rootlets covered in dark reddish-brown scales grow. Together they form a root basket that, when growing on trees, helps to trap leaf litter and dust, forming a nutrient-rich soil that holds water. Its leaves are simple in shape, 13–85 centimetres (5–33 in) long and 3–5 centimetres (1.2–2.0 in) wide and when dry, and covered by a wax-like film. The sori are round and large, occurring in single rows between veins at the far end of the leaf.

== Taxonomy ==
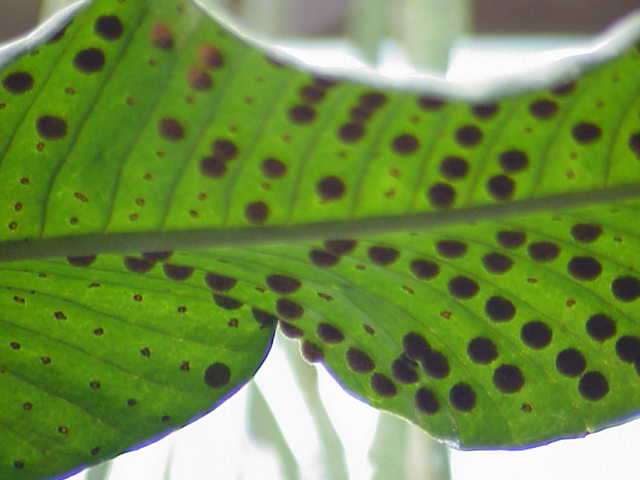
A closeup of the underside of a frond of N. crassifolium, showing the sori

N. crassifolium was first described by Carl Linnaeus in 1753 as Polypodium crassifolium. In 1972, David B. Lellinger moved the species into the genus Niphidium. It can be difficult to distinguish from N. albopunctatissimum, but that species has narrower leaves and is mostly found growing on rocks or on the ground, as well as occupying a different range.

== Distribution ==
Niphidium crassifolium is found in Central and South America, from Mexico in the north to Peru in the south and including Panama, Ecuador, Peru, Brazil, French Guiana, Guyana and the West Indies. It grows at altitudes up to 1,100 metres (3,600 ft) above sea level and over a wide range of humidity. According to Thomas Croat, it is probably the most common fern found on Barro Colorado Island, Panama. Niphidium crassifolium is known to grow on Socratea exorrhiza, occurring on 12% of individuals on Barro Colorado Island. It is also known to grow on Platypodium elegans, Ceiba pentandra, Tabebuia guayacan and Anacardium excelsum.

== Biochemistry ==
This species uses crassulacean acid metabolism (CAM), whereby it stores some carbon dioxide produced by respiration at night and releases this for use in photosynthesis the next day, but the overall contribution of this is small compared to that of true CAM plants such as cacti. Under drought stress, the contribution of CAM increases from 2.7% of total carbon fixation to 10%. The production of gametophytes is determined by light levels rather than by a hormone.

== Uses ==
N. crassifolium can be cultivated, growing well in well-drained soil under medium light. It is reported to be able to survive consecutive days of freezing temperatures down to −7 °C (19 °F). In Northern Peru the fresh stem is used in traditional medicine to treat inflammation of internal organs.
