= Dwarf polypody =

Dwarf polypody is a common name for several ferns and may refer to:

- Grammitis
- Melpomene
