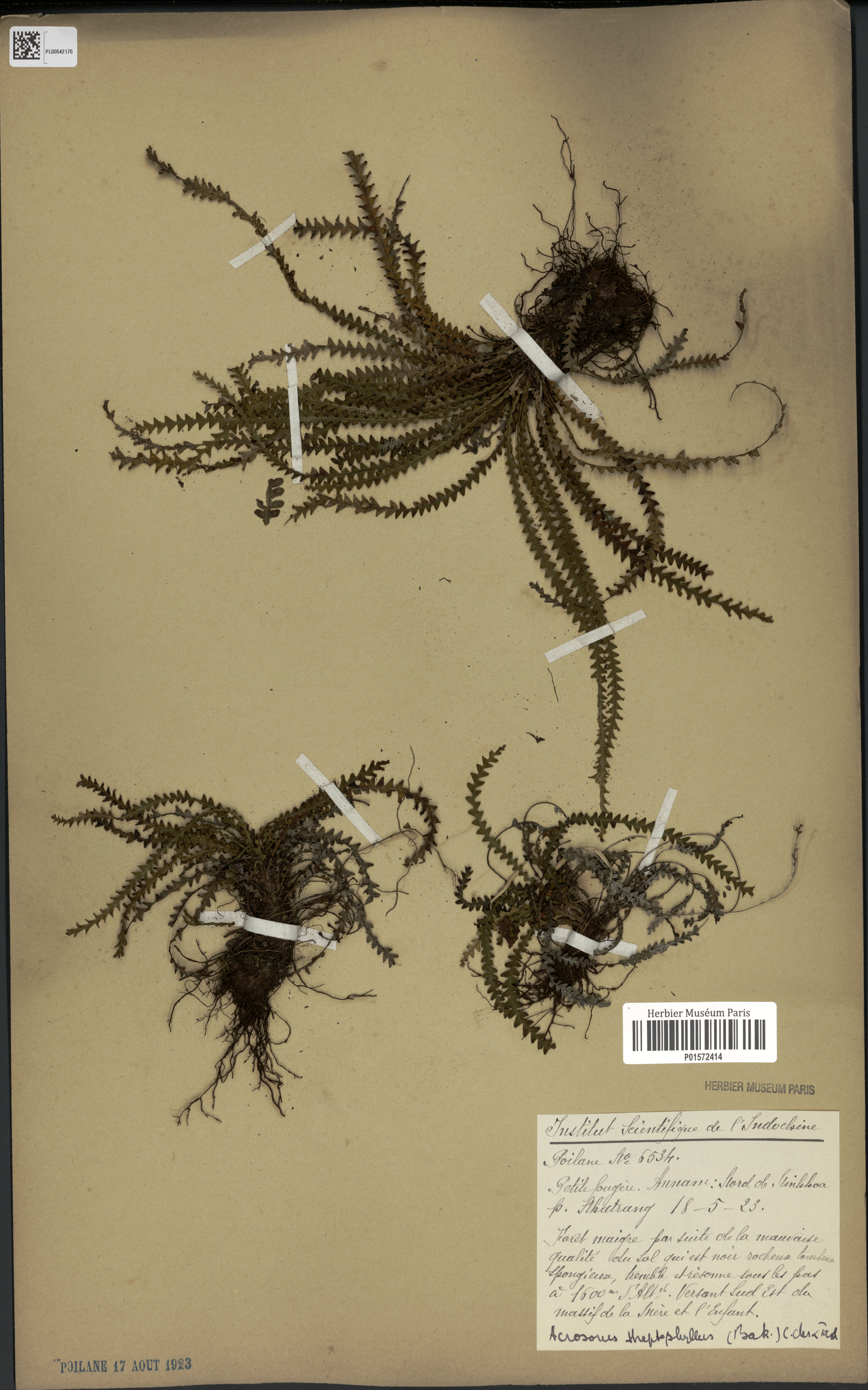
- Pressed specimens of Acrosorus streptophyllus

Scientific classification
- Kingdom: Plantae
- Clade: Tracheophytes
- Division: Polypodiophyta
- Class: Polypodiopsida
- Order: Polypodiales
- Suborder: Polypodiineae
- Family: Polypodiaceae
- Subfamily: Grammitidoideae
- Genus: Acrosorus; Copel.

Type species
- Acrosorus exaltatus (Copel.) Copel.

Species
- See text.

= Acrosorus =

Genus of ferns

Acrosorus is a genus of ferns in the family Polypodiaceae, subfamily Grammitidoideae, according to the Pteridophyte Phylogeny Group classification of 2016 (PPG I). It is known from the Philippines, Malesia, Thailand, and the Pacific islands.

== Description ==
Members of the genus have radially symmetric (rather than flattened) rhizomes, covered with hairless scales of uniform color.

Their leaves may be partly cut, into lobes, or fully divided into pinnae. Their veins are at most a few times forked, and lack hydathodes. Each lobe or pinna of a fertile leaf bears a single sorus near the tip; the edges of the lobes or pinnae are rolled under and fused near the tip to protect the sorus. Leaf hairs may be single setae (bristles), single catenate hairs (consisting of chains of cells), or branched catenate hairs, with setae for branches.

== Taxonomy ==
The genus was created by Edwin Copeland in 1906, to accommodate a group of ferns similar to Prosaptia and until then classified in Davallia.

=== Species ===
As of November 2025, the Checklist of Ferns and Lycophytes of the World accepted the following eight species:

- Acrosorus friderici-et-pauli (Christ) Copel.
- Acrosorus pectinatus Parris
- Acrosorus reineckei (Christ) Copel.
- Acrosorus schlechteri Christ
- Acrosorus sclerophyllus (Alderw.) Parris
- Acrosorus streptophyllus (Baker) Copel.
- Acrosorus subtriangularis (Alderw.) Parris
- Acrosorus vallatus Parris ined.
