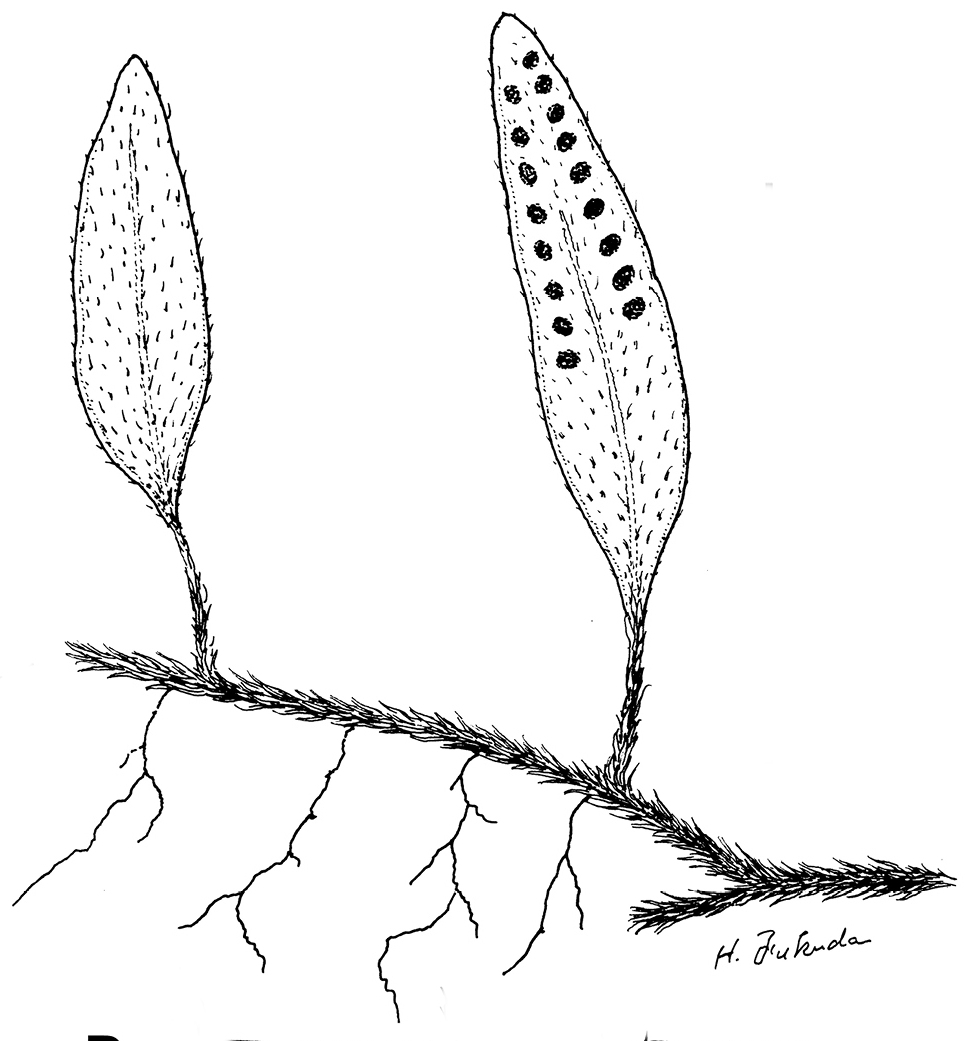
- Illustration accompanying the protologue.

Scientific classification
- Kingdom: Plantae
- Clade: Tracheophytes
- Division: Polypodiophyta
- Class: Polypodiopsida
- Order: Polypodiales
- Suborder: Polypodiineae
- Family: Polypodiaceae
- Subfamily: Adetogrammoideae
- Genus: Adetogramma; T.E.Almeida (2017)
- Species: A. chrysolepis

Binomial name
- Adetogramma chrysolepis (Hook.) T.E.Almeida (2017)

Synonyms
- Lepicystis chrysolepis (Hook.) Diels (1899); Microgramma chrysolepis (Hook.) Crabbe (1967); Polypodium bangii Baker (1901); Polypodium chrysolepis Hook. (1845)

= Adetogramma =

Genus of ferns

Adetogramma chrysolepis is a species of fern in the family Polypodiaceae. It is the sole species in genus Adetogramma. It is an epiphyte native to Bolivia, Ecuador, Peru, and northwestern Argentina.
