= Hovenkampia =

Scientific classification
- Kingdom: Plantae
- Clade: Embryophytes
- Clade: Tracheophytes
- Division: Polypodiophyta
- Class: Polypodiopsida
- Order: Polypodiales
- Suborder: Polypodiineae
- Family: Polypodiaceae
- Subfamily: Platycerioideae
- Genus: Hovenkampia; Li Bing Zhang & X.M.Zhou

Type species
- Hovenkampia schimperiana (Mett. ex Kuhn) Li Bing Zhang & X.M.Zhou

Species
- See text.

Genus of ferns

Hovenkampia is a genus of ferns in the Polypodiaceae described in 2017. Formerly classified in Pyrrosia, the species of the genus are all found in sub-Saharan Africa.

== Taxonomy ==
The genus was described by Li-Bing Zhang and Xin-Mao Zhou in 2017 as part of a phylogenetic analysis of the genus Pyrrosia. That genus, as traditionally classified, was found to be paraphyletic, with three of its species more closely related to Platycerium than to the rest of Pyrrosia. It was named in honour of the pteridologist Peter Hovenkamp.

== Species ==
As of November 2025, three species are accepted in the genus by the Checklist of Ferns and Lycophytes of the World:

Image	Binomial	Distribution
	Hovenkampia africana (Kunze) Li Bing Zhang & X.M.Zhou	South Africa, Mozambique
	Hovenkampia liebuschii (Hieron.) Li Bing Zhang & X.M.Zhou	Tanzania
	Hovenkampia schimperiana (Mett. ex Kuhn) Li Bing Zhang & X.M.Zhou	throughout sub-Saharan Africa

== Distribution and habitat ==
The species are found in sub-Saharan Africa, with H. schimperiana being broadly distributed and the other two species having much more limited ranges.

== Notes and references ==
=== Works cited ===
- Hassler, Michael. "Hovenkampia". World Ferns.
- Zhou, Xin-Mao; Zhang, Liang; Chen, Cheng-Wei; Li, Chun-Xiang; Huan, Yao-Moan; Chen, De-Kui; Lu, Ngan Thi; Cicuzza, Daniele; Knapp, Ralf; Luong, Thien Tam; Nitta, Joel H.; Gao, Xin-Fen; Zhang, Li-Bing (2017). "A plastid phylogeny and character evolution of the Old World fern genus Pyrrosia (Polypodiaceae) with the description of a new genus: Hovenkampia (Polypodiaceae)". Molecular Phylogenetics and Evolution. 114: 271–294. Bibcode:2017MolPE.114..271Z. doi:10.1016/j.ympev.2017.06.020. PMID 28676427.
