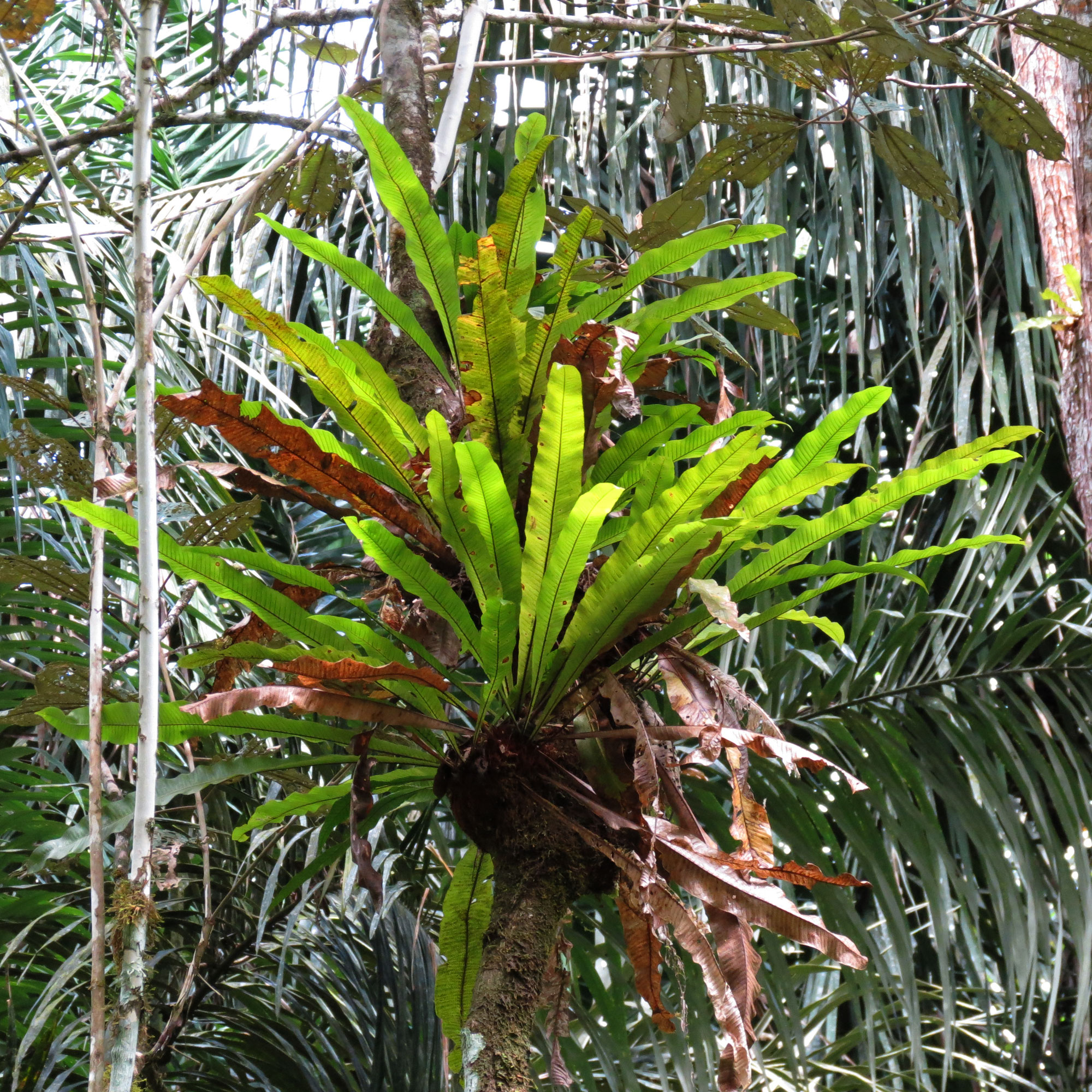
- Niphidium crassifolium in Panama

Scientific classification
- Kingdom: Plantae
- Clade: Tracheophytes
- Division: Polypodiophyta
- Class: Polypodiopsida
- Order: Polypodiales
- Suborder: Polypodiineae
- Family: Polypodiaceae
- Subfamily: Polypodioideae
- Genus: Niphidium; J.Sm.

Species
- See text.

Synonyms
- Pessopteris Underw.ex Maxon; Anaxetum Schott; Pleuridium (C.Presl) Fée

= Niphidium =

Genus of ferns

Niphidium is a genus of ferns in the family Polypodiaceae, subfamily Polypodioideae, according to the Pteridophyte Phylogeny Group classification of 2016 (PPG I). They are native to tropical America.

== Species ==
As of July 2025, Checklist of Ferns and Lycophytes of the World accepted the following eleven species:

- Niphidium albopunctatissimum (J.Sm.) Lellinger
- Niphidium anocarpos (Kunze) Lellinger
- Niphidium carinatum Lellinger
- Niphidium crassifolium (L.) Lellinger
- Niphidium longifolium (Cav.) C.V.Morton & Lellinger
- Niphidium macbridei Lellinger
- Niphidium mortonianum Lellinger
- Niphidium nidulare (Rosenst.) Lellinger
- Niphidium oblanceolatum A.Rojas
- Niphidium rufosquamatum Lellinger
- Niphidium vittaria (Mett.) Lellinger
