= Podosorus =

Scientific classification
- Kingdom: Plantae
- Clade: Tracheophytes
- Division: Polypodiophyta
- Class: Polypodiopsida
- Order: Polypodiales
- Suborder: Polypodiineae
- Family: Polypodiaceae
- Genus: Podosorus; Holttum
- Species: P. angustatus

Binomial name
- Podosorus angustatus Holttum

Genus of plants

Podosorus is a monotypic genus of ferns belonging to the family Polypodiaceae. The only species is Podosorus angustatus.

The species is found in Philippines.
