= Mycopteris =

Scientific classification
- Kingdom: Plantae
- Clade: Embryophytes
- Clade: Tracheophytes
- Division: Polypodiophyta
- Class: Polypodiopsida
- Order: Polypodiales
- Suborder: Polypodiineae
- Family: Polypodiaceae
- Subfamily: Grammitidoideae
- Genus: Mycopteris; Sundue

Type species
- Mycopteris taxifolia (L.) Sundue

Species
- See text.

Genus of ferns

Mycopteris is a genus of ferns in the family Polypodiaceae, subfamily Grammitidoideae, according to the Pteridophyte Phylogeny Group classification of 2016 (PPG I). It is known from the American tropics.

== Description ==
Most members of the genus are epiphytes, although some grow on soil or on rocks.

== Taxonomy ==
The genus was first described by Michael Sundue in 2014 to receive some of the species of the genus Terpsichore. When that genus was described by Alan R. Smith in 1993, he divided it into five informal groups. Subsequent morphological and molecular studies showed that while Terpsichore was polyphyletic, the informal groups were largely monophyletic and could furnish the basis for new genera. These genera were described over the next several years; Sundue's new genus Mycopteris, encompassing the T. taxifolia group, was the last group to be removed from Terpsichore sensu lato.

The name "Mycopteris" is derived from the Greek roots myco-, "fungus", and -pteris, "fern", referring to the near-universal association of these ferns with the ascomycete fungus Acrospermum. Sundue initially placed seventeen species in the genus, one of which was newly described and another elevated from a variety. He suggested that another five to ten species might be described after the completion of a monograph on the genus. In 2017, he described a new species, Mycopteris martiniana, from Mexico.

=== Species ===
As of July 2026, the Checklist of Ferns and Lycophytes of the World accepted the following eighteen species:

- Mycopteris alsopteris (C.V.Morton) Sundue
- Mycopteris amphidasyon (Mett.) Sundue
- Mycopteris attenuatissima (Copel.) Sundue
- Mycopteris costaricensis (Rosenst.) Sundue
- Mycopteris cretata (Maxon) Sundue
- Mycopteris grata (Fée) Sundue
- Mycopteris leucolepis (Gilbert) Sundue
- Mycopteris leucosticta (J.Sm.) Sundue
- Mycopteris longicaulis (Sundue & M.Kessler) Sundue
- Mycopteris longipilosa Sundue
- Mycopteris martiniana Sundue
- Mycopteris pirrensis (A.R.Sm.) Sundue
- Mycopteris praeceps (Sundue & M.Kessler) Sundue
- Mycopteris semihirsuta (Klotzsch) Sundue
- Mycopteris steyermarkii (Labiak) Sundue
- Mycopteris subtilis (Kunze ex Klotzsch) Sundue
- Mycopteris taxifolia (L.) Sundue
- Mycopteris zeledoniana (Lellinger) Sundue

== Distribution ==
Members of the genus are found from Mexico east into the East Indies and south to Bolivia.
