= Thylacopteris =

Scientific classification
- Kingdom: Plantae
- Clade: Embryophytes
- Clade: Tracheophytes
- Division: Polypodiophyta
- Class: Polypodiopsida
- Order: Polypodiales
- Suborder: Polypodiineae
- Family: Polypodiaceae
- Subfamily: Microsoroideae
- Genus: Thylacopteris; Kunze ex J.Sm.

Species
- See text.

Genus of ferns

Thylacopteris is a genus of ferns in the family Polypodiaceae, subfamily Microsoroideae, according to the Pteridophyte Phylogeny Group classification of 2016 (PPG I).

== Taxonomy ==
Thylacopteris was first described by John Smith in 1875 with the name attributed to Gustav Kunze. No species placed in Thylacopteris were included in a molecular phylogenetic study of the subfamily Microsoroideae in 2019, so the relationship with other genera is unclear.

=== Species ===
As of July 2026, the Checklist of Ferns and Lycophytes of the World recognized the following three species:

- Thylacopteris diaphana (Brause) Copel.
- Thylacopteris minuta K.Khori & Khine
- Thylacopteris papillosa (Blume) Kunze ex J.Sm.
