= Archigrammitis =

Scientific classification
- Kingdom: Plantae
- Clade: Tracheophytes
- Division: Polypodiophyta
- Class: Polypodiopsida
- Order: Polypodiales
- Suborder: Polypodiineae
- Family: Polypodiaceae
- Subfamily: Grammitidoideae
- Genus: Archigrammitis; Parris

Type species
- Archigrammitis friderici-et-pauli (Christ) Parris

Species
- See text.

Genus of ferns

Archigrammitis is a genus of ferns in the family Polypodiaceae, subfamily Grammitidoideae, according to the Pteridophyte Phylogeny Group classification of 2016 (PPG I). It is known from Malesia and Polynesia.

== Description ==
The rhizomes are dorsiventral (having distinct upper and lower surfaces) with stipes closely spaced attached in two rows. The stipes are jointed and have phyllopodia at the base. The rhizome scales have hairy edges, and are of uniform color and usually glossy.

The leaf blades are undivided, usually bearing branched veins and more than one row of sori on either side of the costa. They always have unbranched hairs, while many species have branched hairs with a single gland at the apex. Some species have hydathodes, some of which are cretaceous (leaving a lime deposit on the leaf around them). The sporangia bear one to two (occasionally as many as six) stiff, simple straight hairs without glands at the tip of the sporangium.

Parris observed that the genus resembles Prosaptia in bearing phyllopodia at the stipe bases, but lacks the clathrate rhizome scales of that genus. The presence of simple, stiff hairs on the sporangium is shared with Oreogrammitis and Radiogrammitis.

== Taxonomy ==
The genus was first described by Barbara Parris in 2013 to receive some of the species of the genus Grammitis, which as then circumscribed was artificial and contained a number of disparate lineages. The name "Archigrammitis" means "chief Grammitis", referring to the size of the fronds, A. friderici-et-pauli being the largest member of Grammitis under the former circumscription.

=== Species ===
As of October 2025, the Checklist of Ferns and Lycophytes of the World accepted the following seven species:

- Archigrammitis demissa (Parris) Parris
- Archigrammitis friderici-et-pauli (Chris) Parris
- Archigrammitis marquesensis (Parris) Parris
- Archigrammitis ponapensis (Copel.) Parris
- Archigrammitis samoensis (Baker) Parris
- Archigrammitis solomonensis Parris
- Archigrammitis tahitiensis (C.Chr.) Parris

As of 2016, the genus had not yet undergone phylogenetic study.
