= Enterosora =

Scientific classification
- Kingdom: Plantae
- Clade: Tracheophytes
- Division: Polypodiophyta
- Class: Polypodiopsida
- Order: Polypodiales
- Suborder: Polypodiineae
- Family: Polypodiaceae
- Subfamily: Grammitidoideae
- Genus: Enterosora; Baker

Synonyms
- Glyphotaenium (J.Sm.) J.Sm.; Zygophlebia L.E.Bishop

Genus of ferns

Enterosora is a genus of ferns in the family Polypodiaceae, subfamily Grammitidoideae, according to the Pteridophyte Phylogeny Group classification of 2016 (PPG I). PPG I also recognizes the genus Zygophlebia, which more recent sources include in Enterosora. As of February 2019, many do not have formally published names in Enterosora and are retained here in Zygophlebia.

== Taxonomy ==
The genus Enterosora was created by John Gilbert Baker in 1886 with the type species Enterosora campbellii. The genus Zygophlebia was created by L. Earl Bishop in 1989 with the type species Zygophlebia sectifrons, formerly placed in Polypodium. Molecular phylogenetic studies have shown that Enterosora is nested within Zygophlebia, which could be resolved by synonymizing Zygophlebia with Enterosora. In 2016, the authors of the PPG I classification considered merging the genera to be premature. A further study was published in 2019. This showed that Enterosora s.s. was monophyletic, but embedded within two clades of Zyglophlebia, with Ceradenia the sister of Enterosora s.l.:

- - Ceradenia
  - - Enterosora s.l.
      - Zyglophlebia clade 1 (8 species)
      - - Zyglophlebia clade 2 (Z. cornuta, Z. matthewsii, Z. sectifrons)
        - Enterosora s.s.

The Checklist of Ferns and Lycophytes of the World has recognized the merger of Zygophlebia into Enterosora. However, as of April 2025, many former Zygophlebia species do not have formally published names in Enterosora, so are retained here Zygophlebia.

=== Species ===
As of April 2025, the Checklist of Ferns and Lycophytes of the World (CFLW) accepted the following species. Species placed in Zygophlebia but accepted in Enterosora by CFLW are listed separately.

- Enterosora asplenioides L.E.Bishop
- Enterosora barbatula (Baker) Parris
- Enterosora bishopii A.Rojas
- Enterosora campbelliii Baker
- Enterosora ecostata (Sodiro) L.E.Bishop
- Enterosora enterosoroides (Christ) A.Rojas
- Enterosora insidiosa (Sloss.) L.E.Bishop
- Enterosora percrassa (Baker) L.E.Bishop
- Enterosora sinuata Rakotondr. & Parris
- Enterosora trichosora (Hook.) L.E.Bishop
- Enterosora trifurcata (L.) L.E.Bishop
- Enterosora uluguruensis (Reimers) Rakotondr. & Parris

Many of the species placed in Zygophlebia in the PPG I system do not yet have published names in Enterosora and so have "comb. ined." in CFLW. All are retained here in Zygophlebia:

- Enterosora anjanaharibensis (Rakotondr.) comb. ined. = Zygophlebia anjanaharibensis Rakotondr.
- Enterosora cornuta (Lellinger) Shalisko & Sundue = Zygophlebia cornuta (Lellinger) L.E.Bishop
- Enterosora devoluta (Baker) Shalisko & Sundue = Zygophlebia devoluta (Baker) Parris
- Enterosora dudleyi (L.E.Bishop) A.R.Sm. & M.Kessler = Zygophlebia dudleyi L.E.Bishop
- Enterosora eminens (C.V.Morton) comb. ined. = Zygophlebia eminens (C.V.Morton) L.E.Bishop
- Enterosora forsythiana (Baker) Shalisko & Sundue = Zygophlebia forsythiana (Baker) Parris
- Enterosora goodmanii (Rakotondr.) Shalisko & Sundue = Zygophlebia goodmanii Rakotondr.
- Enterosora humbertii (C.Chr.) Shalisko & Sundue = Zygophlebia humbertii (C.Chr.) Parris
- Enterosora longipilosa (C.Chr.) comb. ined. = Zygophlebia longipilosa (C.Chr.) L.E.Bishop
- Enterosora major (Reimers) comb. ined. = Zygophlebia major (Reimers) Parris
- Enterosora mathewsii (Kunze ex Mett.) Shalisko & Sundue = Zygophlebia matthewsii (Kunze ex Mett.) L.E.Bishop
- Enterosora rouxii (Rakotondr. & Parris) comb. ined. = Zygophlebia rouxii Rakotondr. & Parris
- Enterosora sectifrons (Kunze ex Mett.) Shalisko & Sundue = Zygophlebia sectifrons (Kunze ex Mett.) L.E.Bishop
- Enterosora subpinnata (Baker) Shalisko & Sundue = Zygophlebia subpinnata (Baker) L.E.Bishop ex Parris
- Enterosora torulosa (Baker) Shalisko & Sundue = Zygophlebia torulosa (Baker) Parris
- Enterosora villosissima (Hook.) Shalisko & Sundue = Zygophlebia villosissima (Hook.) L.E.Bishop
- Enterosora werffii (L.E.Bishop) comb. ined. = Zygophlebia werffii L.E.Bishop

== Distribution ==
When circumscribed to include Zygophlebia, the genus Enterosora is widely distributed in the Neotropics and tropical Africa, including Madagascar and the Mascarene Islands. The species which Bishop placed in Zygophlebia were mainly native to the Neotropics, with a few African species.
