= Synammia =

Scientific classification
- Kingdom: Plantae
- Clade: Tracheophytes
- Division: Polypodiophyta
- Class: Polypodiopsida
- Order: Polypodiales
- Suborder: Polypodiineae
- Family: Polypodiaceae
- Genus: Synammia; C.Presl (1836)

Species
- Synammia espinosae (Weath.) G.Kunkel; Synammia feuillei (Bertero) Copel.; Synammia intermedia (Colla) G.Kunkel

Genus of ferns

Synammia is a genus of ferns in the family Polypodiaceae. It includes three species native to Chile and southern Argentina:

- Synammia espinosae (Weath.) G.Kunkel – northern Chile
- Synammia feuillei (Bertero) Copel. – southern Argentina and central and southern Chile
- Synammia intermedia (Colla) G.Kunkel – Juan Fernández Islands
