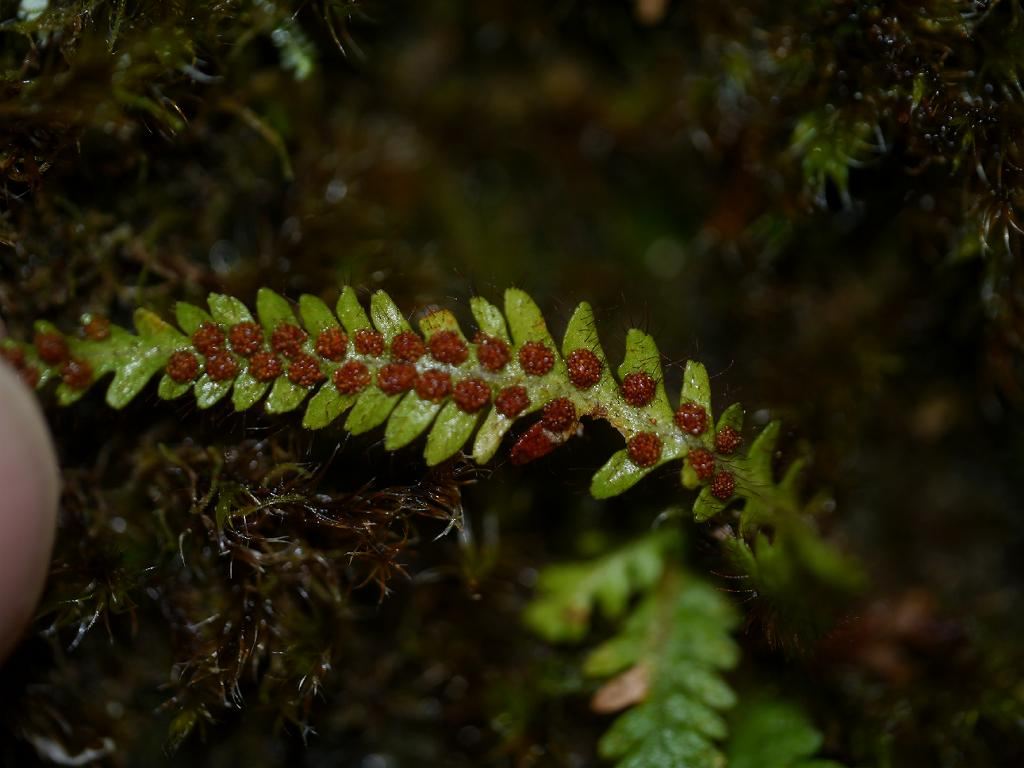
- Micropolypodium okuboi

Scientific classification
- Kingdom: Plantae
- Clade: Tracheophytes
- Division: Polypodiophyta
- Class: Polypodiopsida
- Order: Polypodiales
- Suborder: Polypodiineae
- Family: Polypodiaceae
- Subfamily: Grammitidoideae
- Genus: Micropolypodium; Hayata

Type species
- Micropolypodium okuboi (Yatabe) Hayata

= Micropolypodium =

Genus of ferns

Micropolypodium is a genus of ferns in the family Polypodiaceae, subfamily Grammitidoideae, according to the Pteridophyte Phylogeny Group classification of 2016 (PPG I).

It is native to China, Japan, and the Philippines.

== Species ==
Neotropical (the Americas) species formerly placed in the genus have been reclassified to Moranopteris.

Micropolypodium now contains the following three species according to the Checklist of Ferns and Lycophytes of the World as of April 2025:

- Micropolypodium okuboi (Yatabe) Hayata
- Micropolypodium pulogense (Copel.) A.R.Sm.
- Micropolypodium sikkimense (Hieron.) X.C.Zhang
