= Pleurosoriopsis =

Scientific classification
- Kingdom: Plantae
- Clade: Tracheophytes
- Division: Polypodiophyta
- Class: Polypodiopsida
- Order: Polypodiales
- Suborder: Polypodiineae
- Family: Polypodiaceae
- Genus: Pleurosoriopsis; Fomin
- Species: P. makinoi

Binomial name
- Pleurosoriopsis makinoi (Maxim. ex Makino) Fomin

Synonyms
- Anogramma makinoi (Maxim. ex Makino) Christ; Gymnogramma makinoi Maxim. ex Makino

Genus of ferns

Pleurosoriopsis is a genus of ferns in the family Polypodiaceae, subfamily Polypodioideae, according to the Pteridophyte Phylogeny Group classification of 2016 (PPG I). The genus has only one species, Pleurosoriopsis makinoi, native to China (north-central, south-central and Manchuria), Japan, Korea, and Primorsky Krai in Russia.
