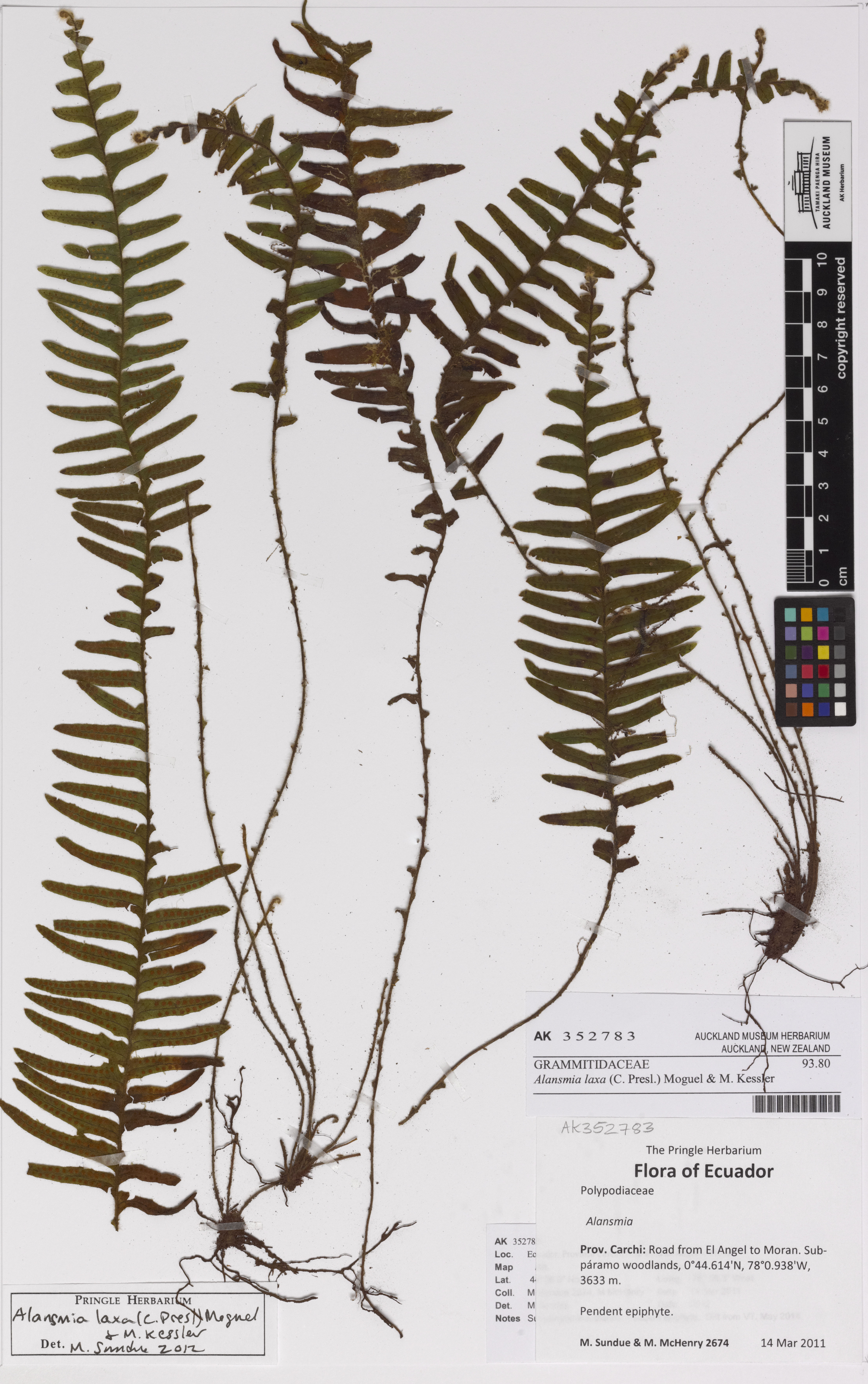
- A. laxa specimen at the Auckland Museum

Scientific classification
- Kingdom: Plantae
- Clade: Embryophytes
- Clade: Tracheophytes
- Division: Polypodiophyta
- Class: Polypodiopsida
- Order: Polypodiales
- Suborder: Polypodiineae
- Family: Polypodiaceae
- Subfamily: Grammitidoideae
- Genus: Alansmia; M.Kessler, Moguel, Sundue & Labiak

Species
- See text.

= Alansmia =

Genus of ferns

Alansmia is a genus of ferns in the family Polypodiaceae, subfamily Grammitidoideae, according to the Pteridophyte Phylogeny Group classification of 2016 (PPG I). The genus is mainly native to the Neotropics, with a few species in tropical Africa.

== Species ==
As of June 2026, the Checklist of Ferns and Lycophytes of the World accepted the following twenty-four species:

- Alansmia bradeana (Labiak) Moguel & M.Kessler
- Alansmia canescens (A.Rojas) Moguel & M.Kessler
- Alansmia concinna (A.R.Sm.) Moguel & M.Kessler
- Alansmia contacta (Copel.) Moguel & M.Kessler
- Alansmia cultrata (Bory ex Willd.) Moguel & M.Kessler
- Alansmia dependens (Baker) Moguel & M.Kessler
- Alansmia diaphana (Moguel & M.Kessler) Moguel & M.Kessler
- Alansmia elastica (Bory ex Willd.) Moguel & M.Kessler
- Alansmia heteromorpha (Hook. & Grev.) Moguel & M.Kessler
- Alansmia immixta (Stolze) Moguel & M.Kessler
- Alansmia kirkii (Parris) Moguel & M.Kessler
- Alansmia lanigera (Desv.) Moguel & M.Kessler
- Alansmia laxa (C.Presl) Moguel & M.Kessler
- Alansmia longa (C.Chr.) Moguel & M.Kessler
- Alansmia monosora (Moguel & M.Kessler) Moguel & M.Kessler
- Alansmia reclinata (Brack.) Moguel & M.Kessler
- Alansmia semilunaris (Moguel & M.Kessler) Moguel & M.Kessler
- Alansmia senilis (Fée) Moguel & M.Kessler
- Alansmia smithii (A.Rojas) Moguel & M.Kessler
- Alansmia spathulata (A.R.Sm.) Moguel & M.Kessler
- Alansmia stella (Copel.) Moguel & M.Kessler
- Alansmia turrialbae (Christ) Moguel & M.Kessler
- Alansmia variabilis (Mett. ex Kuhn) Moguel & M.Kessler
- Alansmia xanthotrichia (Klotzsch) Moguel & M.Kessler
