= Ctenopteris =

Genus of ferns

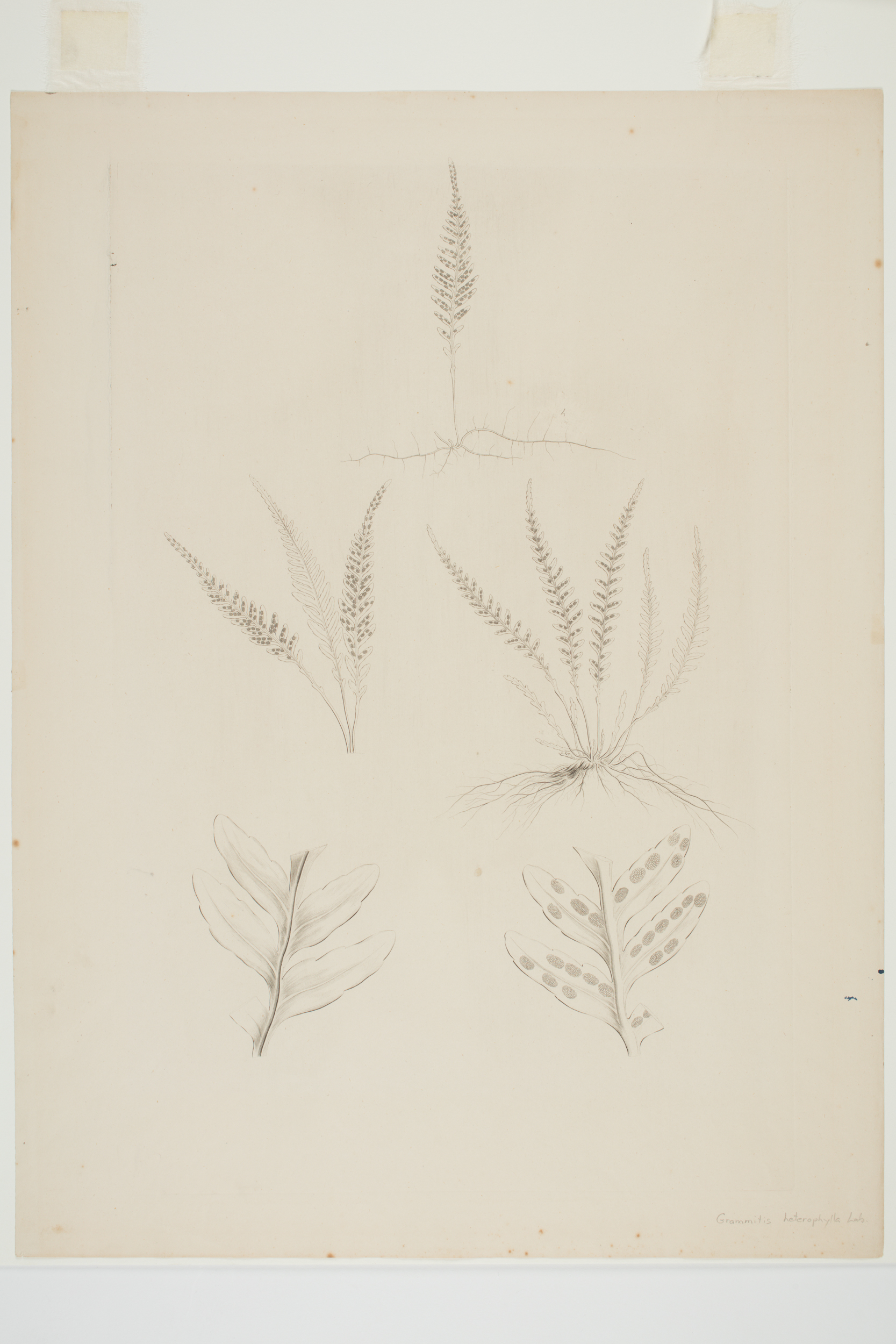
Ctenopteris heterophylla

Ctenopteris is a defunct genus of ferns in the family Polypodiaceae. The name is derived from two Greek words: ktenos, "comb", and pteris, "fern".

The name "Ctenopteris" can no longer be used because its type species, Ctenopteris venulosa has been transferred to Prosaptia. Because Ctenopteris is polyphyletic, some of its species were not transferred to Prosaptia with the type species. For these, the name Ctenopteris was used provisionally, pending their reassignment to other genera.

Edwin Bingham Copeland wrote extensively on Ctenopteris in the 1940s and 1950s. As he defined it, the genus was broadly distributed in the Southern Hemisphere including Australia, New Zealand, southern Asia and southern Africa.
