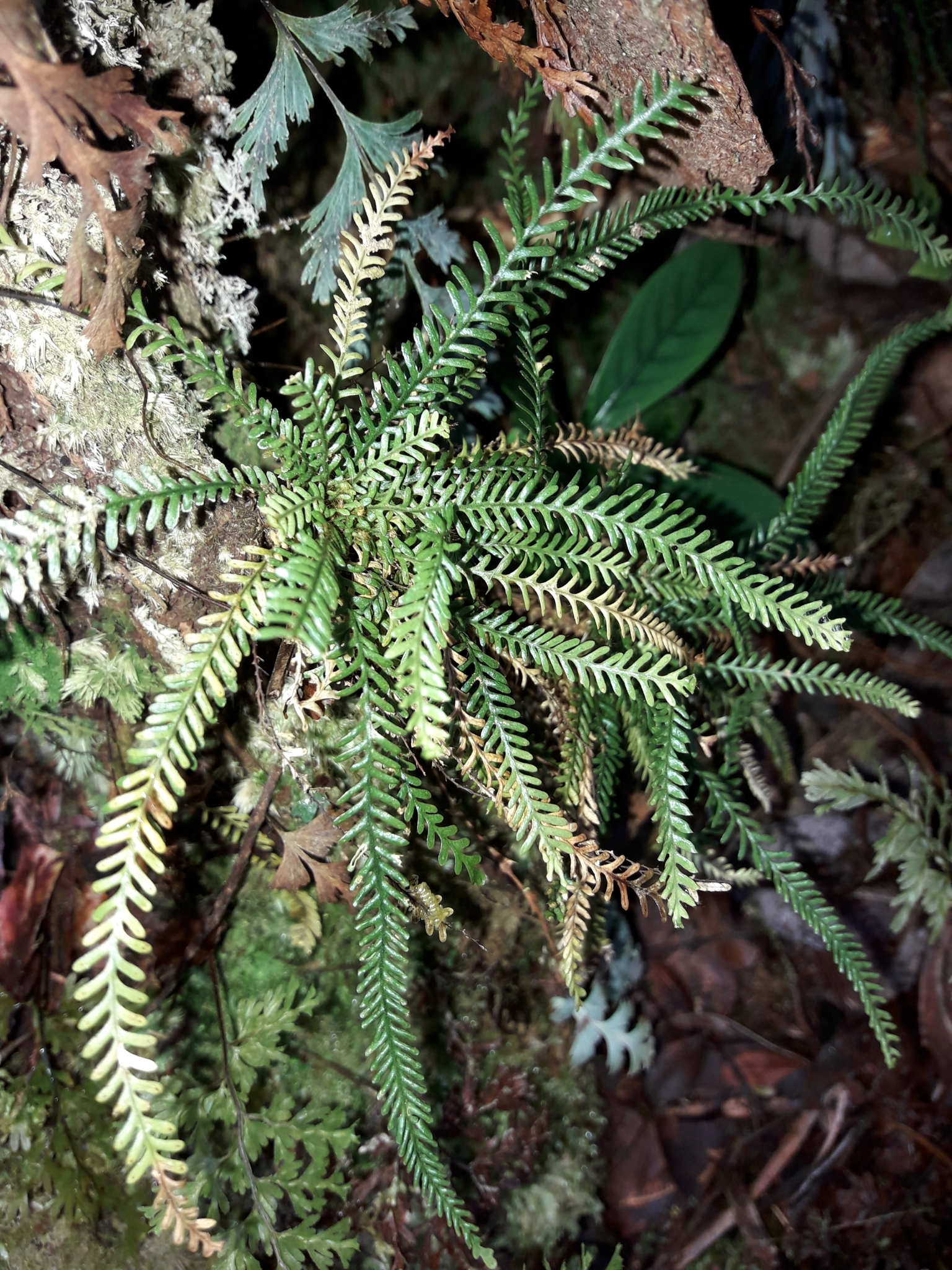
- Calymmodon cucullatus

Scientific classification
- Kingdom: Plantae
- Clade: Tracheophytes
- Division: Polypodiophyta
- Class: Polypodiopsida
- Order: Polypodiales
- Suborder: Polypodiineae
- Family: Polypodiaceae
- Subfamily: Grammitidoideae
- Genus: Calymmodon; C.Presl

Synonyms
- Plectopteris Fée

= Calymmodon =

Genus of ferns

Calymmodon is a genus of ferns in the family Polypodiaceae, subfamily Grammitidoideae, according to the Pteridophyte Phylogeny Group classification of 2016 (PPG I). Its known range is Sri Lanka, Thailand, Vietnam, Taiwan, Malesia, Australia, Micronesia and Polynesia.

== Species ==
As of October 2025, the Checklist of Ferns and Lycophytes of the World accepted the following sixty-four species:

- Calymmodon acrosoroides Parris, sp. ined.
- Calymmodon acutangularis Parris, sp. ined.
- Calymmodon ashtonii Parris
- Calymmodon asiaticus Copel.
- Calymmodon atrichus Copel.
- Calymmodon binaiyensis Parris, sp. ined.
- Calymmodon borneensis Parris, sp. ined.
- Calymmodon clavifer (Hook.) T.Moore
- Calymmodon concinnus Parris
- Calymmodon conduplicatus (Brause) Copel.
- Calymmodon coriaceus Parris, sp. ined.
- Calymmodon cucullatus (Nees & Blume) C.Presl
- Calymmodon curtus Parris
- Calymmodon debilis Parris, sp. ined.
- Calymmodon decipiens Parris, sp. ined.
- Calymmodon fragilis Copel.
- Calymmodon furcatus Parris
- Calymmodon gibbsiae Parris, sp. ined.
- Calymmodon glabrescens Copel.
- Calymmodon gracilis (Fée) Copel.
- Calymmodon gracillimus (Copel.) Nakai ex H.Itô
- Calymmodon grantii Copel.
- Calymmodon holttumii Parris, sp. ined.
- Calymmodon hyalinus Copel.
- Calymmodon hygroscopicus Copel.
- Calymmodon ichthyorhachioides Alston
- Calymmodon innominatus Parris, sp. ined.
- Calymmodon kanikehensis Parris, sp. ined.
- Calymmodon kinabaluensis Parris, sp. ined.
- Calymmodon latealatus Copel.
- Calymmodon ledermannii Parris, sp. ined.
- Calymmodon linearis Parris, sp. ined.
- Calymmodon longipilosus Parris, sp. ined.
- Calymmodon luerssenianus (Domin) Copel.
- Calymmodon minutus Parris
- Calymmodon mnioides Copel.
- Calymmodon morobensis Parris, sp. ined.
- Calymmodon multisorus Parris
- Calymmodon murkelensis Parris, sp. ined.
- Calymmodon muscoides (Copel.) Copel.
- Calymmodon ohaensis Parris, sp. ined.
- Calymmodon oligotrichus T.C.Hsu
- Calymmodon ordinatus Copel.
- Calymmodon orientalis Copel.
- Calymmodon pallidivirens Parris, sp. ined.
- Calymmodon papuanus Parris, sp. ined.
- Calymmodon pectinatus Parris
- Calymmodon pergracillimus (Alderw.) Copel.
- Calymmodon persimilis (C.Chr.) Tagawa
- Calymmodon ponapensis Copel.
- Calymmodon pseudoclavifer Parris, sp. ined.
- Calymmodon pseudordinatus Parris, sp. ined.
- Calymmodon ramifer Copel.
- Calymmodon rapensis Copel.
- Calymmodon reconditus Parris, sp. ined.
- Calymmodon redactus Parris, sp. ined.
- Calymmodon rupicola Parris
- Calymmodon schultzei Parris, sp. ined.
- Calymmodon seramensis Parris, sp. ined.
- Calymmodon solomonensis Parris
- Calymmodon subalpinus Parris, sp. ined.
- Calymmodon subgracilis Parris
- Calymmodon subtilis Parris
- Calymmodon tehoruensis Parris, sp. ined.
