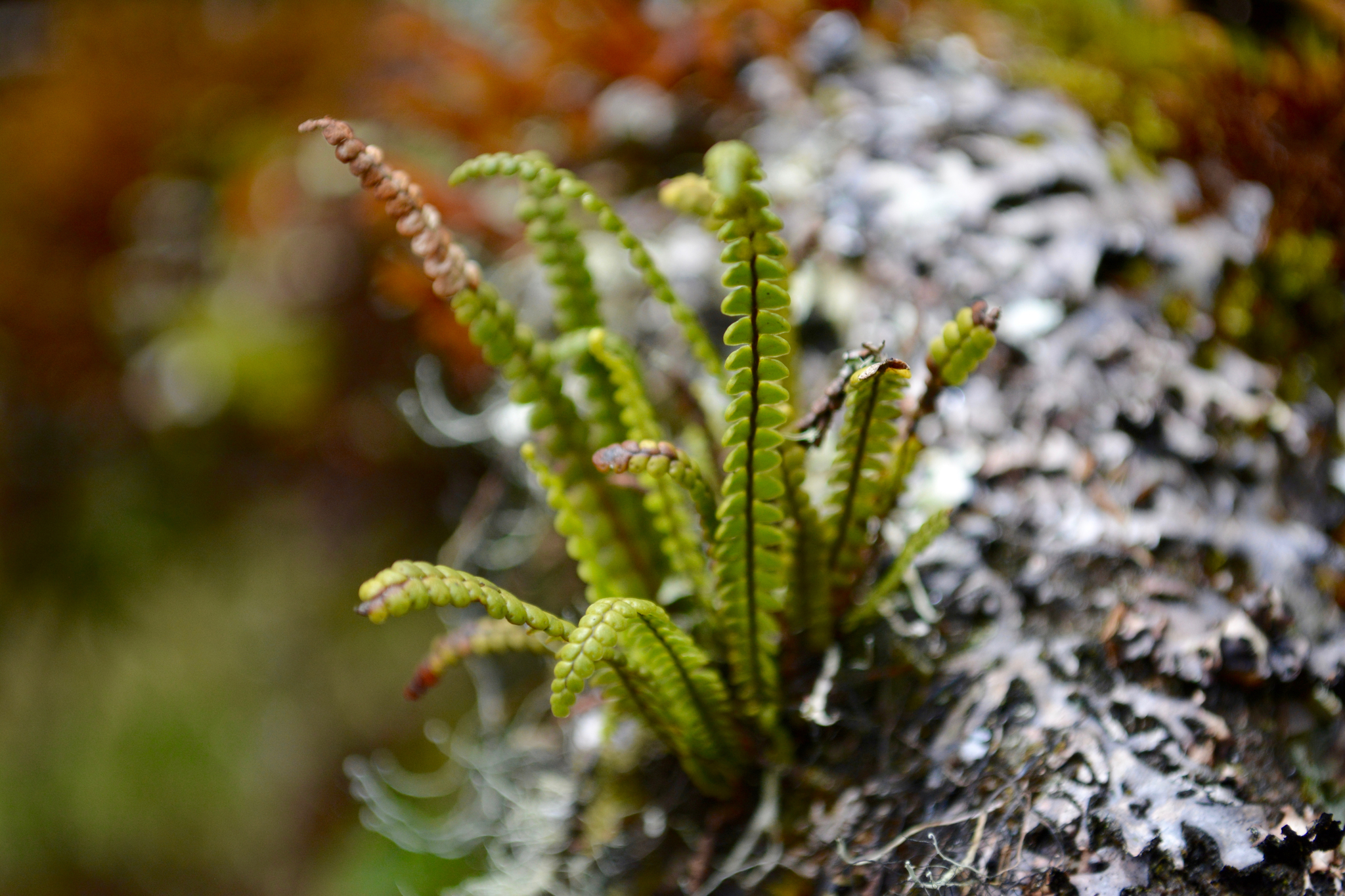
- Melpomene moniliformis

Scientific classification
- Kingdom: Plantae
- Clade: Tracheophytes
- Division: Polypodiophyta
- Class: Polypodiopsida
- Order: Polypodiales
- Suborder: Polypodiineae
- Family: Polypodiaceae
- Subfamily: Grammitidoideae
- Genus: Melpomene; A.R.Sm. & R.C.Moran

Species
- See text.

Synonyms
- Polypodium sect. Cryptosorus (Fée) E.Fourn.; Cryptosorus Fée; Grammitis sect. Cryptosorus (Fée) R.M.Tryon & A.F.Tryon

= Melpomene (plant) =

Genus of ferns

Melpomene is a genus of ferns in the family Polypodiaceae, subfamily Grammitidoideae, according to the Pteridophyte Phylogeny Group classification of 2016 (PPG I).

It is native to the Neotropical realm in the Americas and Africa.

The genus name of Melpomene is named after Melpomene, the Greek mythology being, the muse of chorus, who eventually became the muse of tragedy.

The genus was circumscribed by Alan Reid Smith and Robbin C. Moran in Novon Vol.2 (Issue 4) on page 426 in 1992.

== Species ==
Melpomene contains around 30, to 49 species. As of April 2025, the Checklist of Ferns and Lycophytes of the World accepted the following thirty species:

- Melpomene albicans Lehnert
- Melpomene allosuroides (Rosenst.) A.R.Sm. & R.C.Moran
- Melpomene anazalea Sundue & Lehnert
- Melpomene caput-gorgonis Lehnert
- Melpomene deltata (Mickel & Beitel) A.R.Sm. & R.C.Moran
- Melpomene erecta (C.V.Morton) A.R.Sm. & R.C.Moran
- Melpomene firma (J.Sm.) A.R.Sm. & R.C.Moran
- Melpomene flabelliformis (Poir.) A.R.Sm. & R.C.Moran
- Melpomene flagellata Lehnert
- Melpomene gracilis (Hook.) A.R.Sm.
- Melpomene huancabambensis Lehnert
- Melpomene jimenezii Lehnert
- Melpomene leptostoma (Fée) A.R.Sm. & R.C.Moran
- Melpomene melanosticta (Kunze) A.R.Sm. & R.C.Moran
- Melpomene michaelium Lehnert
- Melpomene moniliformis (Lag. ex Sw.) A.R.Sm. & R.C.Moran
- Melpomene occidentalis Lehnert
- Melpomene paradoxa Lehnert
- Melpomene pennellii (Copel.) A.R.Sm. & R.C.Moran
- Melpomene personata Lehnert
- Melpomene peruviana (Desv.). A.R.Sm. & R.C.Moran
- Melpomene pilosissima (M.Martens & Galeotti) A.R.Sm. & R.C.Moran
- Melpomene pseudonutans (Christ & Rosenst.) A.R.Sm. & R.C.Moran
- Melpomene sklenarii Lehnert
- Melpomene sodiroi (Christ & Rosenst.) A.R.Sm. & R.C.Moran
- Melpomene vulcanica Lehnert
- Melpomene wolfii (Hieron.) A.R.Sm. & R.C.Moran
- Melpomene xiphopteroides (Liebm.) A.R.Sm. & R.C.Moran
- Melpomene youngii (Stolze) B.León & A.R.Sm.
- Melpomene zempoaltepetlensis (Mickel & Beitel) A.R.Sm.
