= Cochlidium =

Scientific classification
- Kingdom: Plantae
- Clade: Tracheophytes
- Division: Polypodiophyta
- Class: Polypodiopsida
- Order: Polypodiales
- Suborder: Polypodiineae
- Family: Polypodiaceae
- Subfamily: Grammitidoideae
- Genus: Cochlidium; Kaulf.

Genus of plants

Cochlidium is a genus of ferns belonging to the family Polypodiaceae.

The species of this genus are found in America, Africa.

== Species ==
As of April 2025, the Checklist of Ferns and Lycophytes of the World accepts the following seventeen species:

- Cochlidium acrosorum A.Rojas
- Cochlidium attenuatum A.C.Sm.
- Cochlidium connellii (Baker) A.C.Sm.
- Cochlidium furcatum (Hook. & Grev.) C.Chr.
- Cochlidium graminoides (Sw.) Kaulf.
- Cochlidium jungens L.E.Bishop
- Cochlidium linearifolium (Desv.) Maxon ex C.Chr.
- Cochlidium nervatum A.Rojas
- Cochlidium proctorii (Copel.) L.E.Bishop
- Cochlidium pumilum (Massee ex C.Chr.) Stolze
- Cochlidium repandum L.E.Bishop
- Cochlidium rostratum (Hook.) Maxon ex C.Chr.
- Cochlidium seminudum (Willd.) Maxon
- Cochlidium serrulatum(Sw.) L.E.Bishop
- Cochlidium tepuiense (A.C.Sm.) L.E.Bishop
- Cochlidium wurdackii L.E.Bishop
