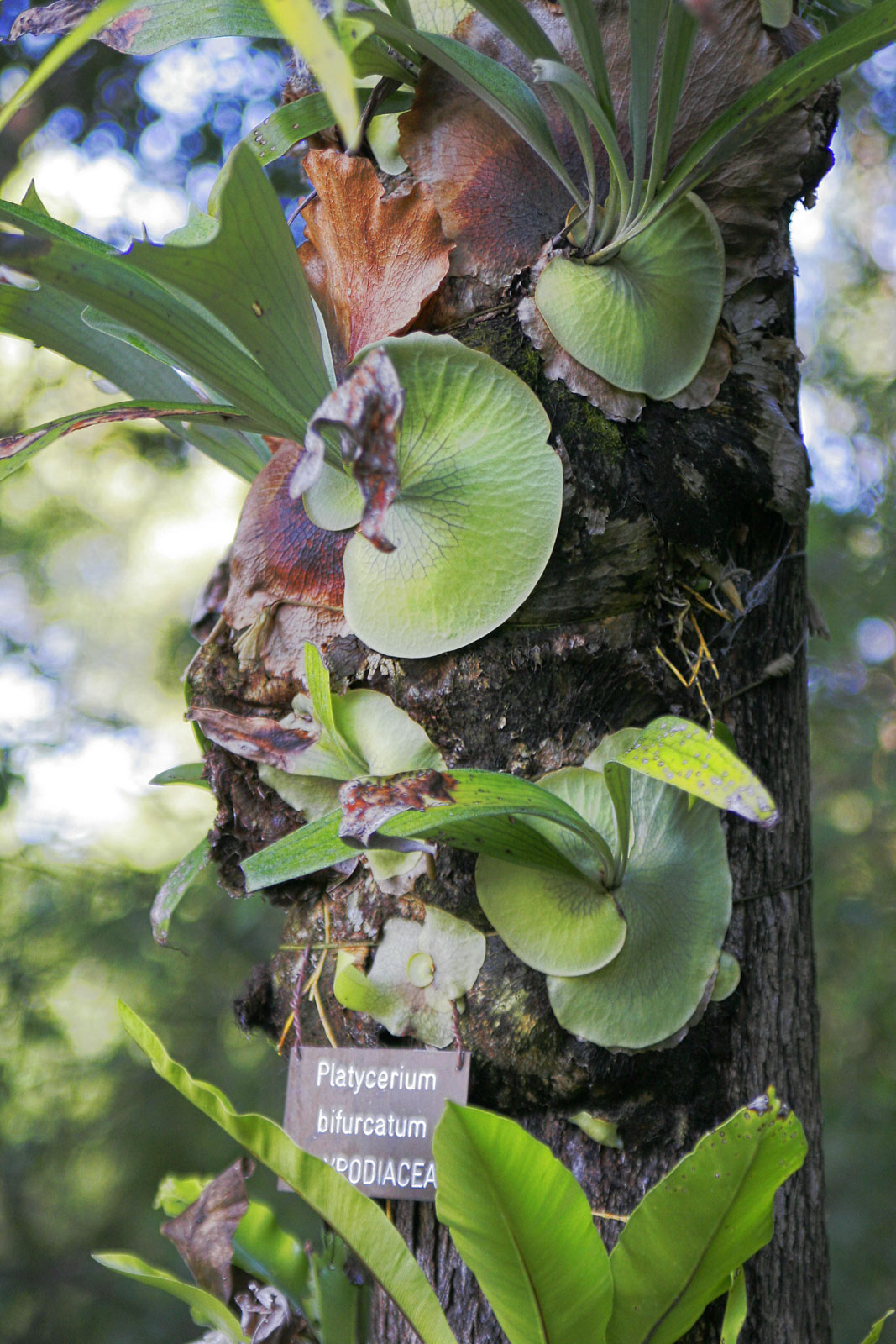
- Platycerium bifurcatum - Australian National Botanical Gardens, Canberra

Scientific classification
- Kingdom: Plantae
- Clade: Tracheophytes
- Division: Polypodiophyta
- Class: Polypodiopsida
- Order: Polypodiales
- Suborder: Polypodiineae
- Family: Polypodiaceae
- Subfamily: Platycerioideae; B.K.Nayar

Genera
- See text.

= Platycerioideae =

Subfamily of ferns

Platycerioideae is a small subfamily of the fern family Polypodiaceae in the Pteridophyte Phylogeny Group classification of 2016 (PPG I). The subfamily is also treated as the tribe Platycerieae within a very broadly defined family Polypodiaceae sensu lato.

Two genera are recognized in PPG I:

- Platycerium Desv.
- Pyrrosia Mirb.

In 2017, Pyrrosia was found to be paraphyletic and three species were transferred to the new genus Hovenkampia to remedy this.
