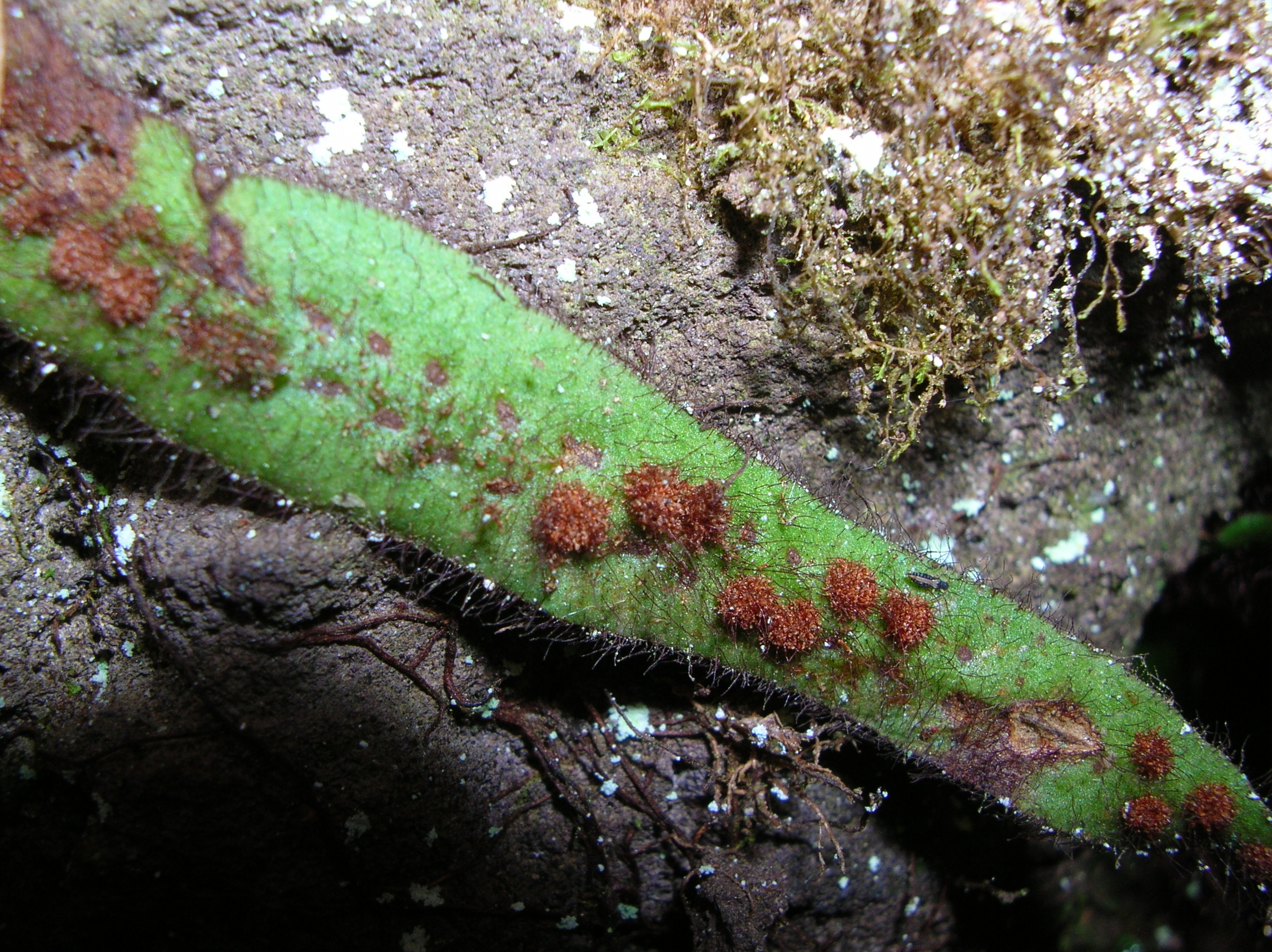
- Leaf of Grammitis hookeri

Scientific classification
- Kingdom: Plantae
- Clade: Embryophytes
- Clade: Tracheophytes
- Division: Polypodiophyta
- Class: Polypodiopsida
- Order: Polypodiales
- Suborder: Polypodiineae
- Family: Polypodiaceae
- Subfamily: Grammitidoideae; Parris & Sundue

Genera
- See text

= Grammitidoideae =

Subfamily of ferns

Grammitidoideae is a subfamily of the fern family Polypodiaceae, whose members are informally known as grammitids. It comprises a clade of about 750 species. They are distributed over higher elevations in both the Old and New World. This group was previously treated as a separate family, Grammitidaceae until molecular phylogenies showed it to be nested within the Polypodiaceae. It has since been treated as an unranked clade within subfamily Polypodioideae (renamed tribe Polypodieae in one classification), and, most recently, as a separate subfamily (reducing Polypodioideae to an evolutionary grade).

== Circumscription ==
In 2011, Christenhusz et al. placed the grammitid ferns in the subfamily Polypodioideae, within the Polypodiaceae, as an informal group without rank. In 2014, Christenhusz and Chase expanded the circumscription of both family and subfamily, placing the Polypodioideae as previously delimited, including grammitids, in tribe Polypodieae. The PPG I classification of 2016 largely reverted to the 2011 circumscriptions of these groups, but placed the grammitids in a new subfamily.

The following phylogram shows a likely relationship between grammitid ferns and the Polypodiaceae subfamilies, based on Schuettpelz & Pryer, 2008, with PPG I subfamilies shown.

- Polypodiaceae
  - Loxogrammoideae
  - - - Drynarioideae
      - - Platycerioideae
        - Microsoroideae
    - - "non-grammitid", Polypodioideae sensu PPG I
      - "grammitid" ferns, Grammitidoideae

== Genera ==
The Pteridophyte Phylogeny Group classification of 2016 (PPG I) recognizes the following genera:

- Acrosorus Copel. – Southeastern Asia
- Adenophorus Gaudich. – Hawaii
- Alansmia M.Kessler, Moguel, Sundue & Labiak – Neotropics, Africa
- Archigrammitis Parris – Malesia, Polynesia
- Ascogrammitis Sundue – Neotropics
- Calymmodon C.Presl – Southeastern Asia
- Ceradenia L.E.Bishop – mainly tropical Africa
- Chrysogrammitis Parris – Southeastern Asia
- Cochlidium Kaulf. (including Xiphopteris Kaulf.) – Neotropics, Taiwan
- Ctenopterella Parris – Southeastern Asia, Australia
- Dasygrammitis Parris – Southeastern Asia
- Enterosora Baker – Neotropics, Madagascar
- Galactodenia Sundue & Labiak – Neotropics
- Grammitis Sw. – Neotropics
- Lellingeria A.R.Sm. & R.C.Moran – Neotropics
- Leucotrichum Labiak – Neotropics, Madagascar
- Lomaphlebia J.Sm.
- Luisma M.T.Murillo & A.R.Sm. – Colombia
- Melpomene A.R.Sm. & R.C.Moran – Neotropics
- Micropolypodium Hayata – China, Japan
- Moranopteris R.Y.Hirai & J.Prado – Neotropics
- Mycopteris Sundue – Neotropics
- Notogrammitis Parris – Australia, New Zealand
- Oreogrammitis Copeland – Southeastern Asia, Australia, Pacific islands, China, Philippines
- Prosaptia C.Presl (including Ctenopteris Blume ex Kunze) – Southeastern Asia
- Radiogrammitis Parris – Southeastern Asia, Pacific islands; sunk into Oreogrammitis in 2020
- Scleroglossum Alderwerelt (including Nematopteris Alderw.) – Southeastern Asia, Pacific islands
- Stenogrammitis Labiak – Neotropics, Africa, Pacific islands
- Terpsichore A.R.Sm. – Neotropics
- Themelium (T.Moore) Parris – China, Philippines, Thailand; sunk into Oreogrammitis in 2020
- Tomophyllum (E.Fournier) Parris – China, Inda, Nepal
- Xiphopterella Parris – China
- Zygophlebia L.E.Bishop – Neotropics, Madagascar; sunk into Enterosora in 2019
