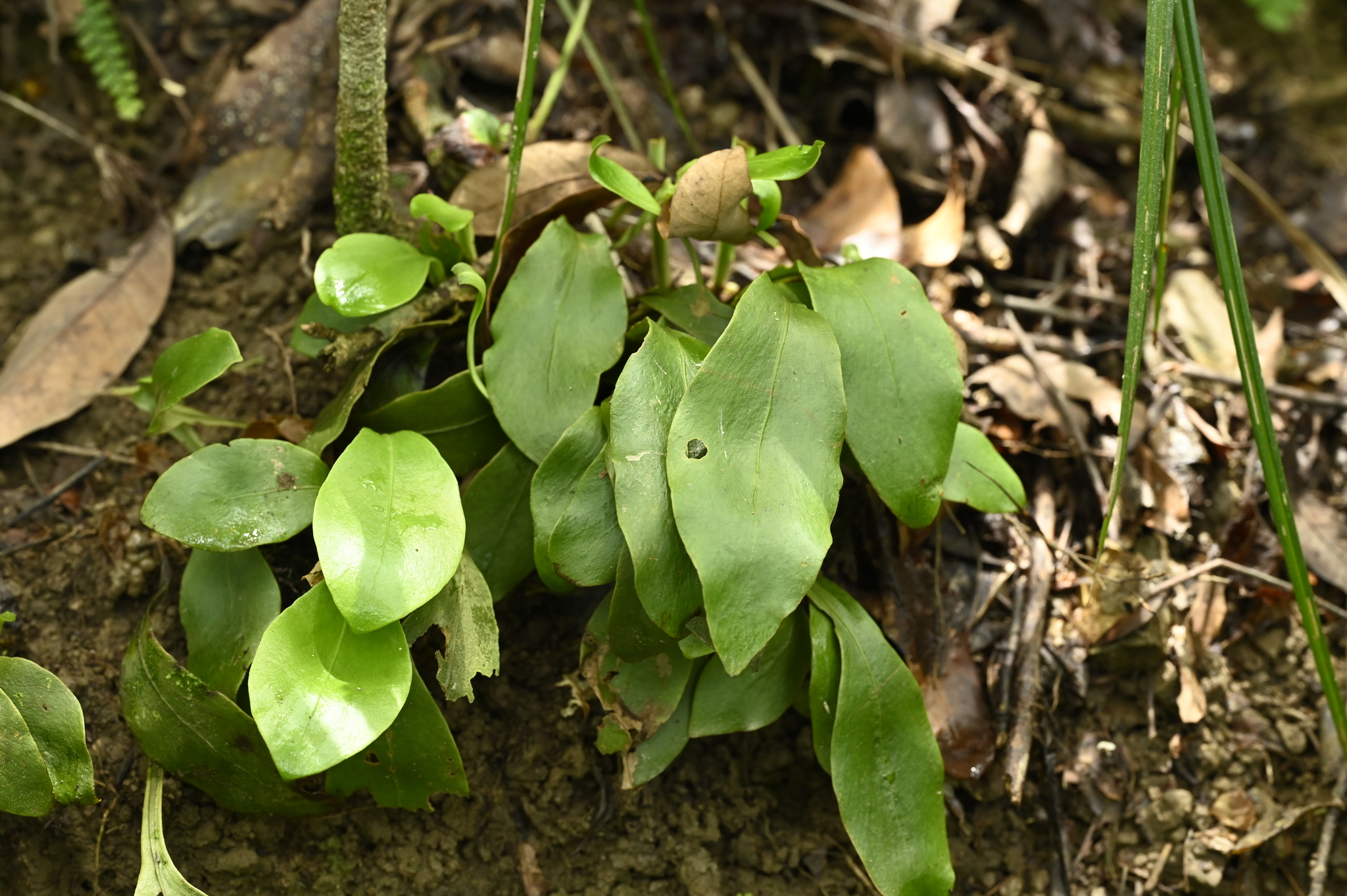
- Loxogramme biformis

Scientific classification
- Kingdom: Plantae
- Clade: Tracheophytes
- Division: Polypodiophyta
- Class: Polypodiopsida
- Order: Polypodiales
- Suborder: Polypodiineae
- Family: Polypodiaceae
- Subfamily: Loxogrammoideae; H.Schneid.

Genera
- Dictymia J.Sm.; Loxogramme (Blume) C.Presl

= Loxogrammoideae =

Subfamily of ferns

Loxogrammoideae is a small subfamily of the fern family Polypodiaceae in the Pteridophyte Phylogeny Group classification of 2016 (PPG I), with two genera, Dictymia and Loxogramme. The subfamily was previously considered to be a separate family, Loxogrammaceae Ching ex Pic.Serm., and is also treated as the tribe Loxogrammeae within a very broadly defined family Polypodiaceae sensu lato. Molecular phylogenetic studies place the group within Polypodiaceae.
