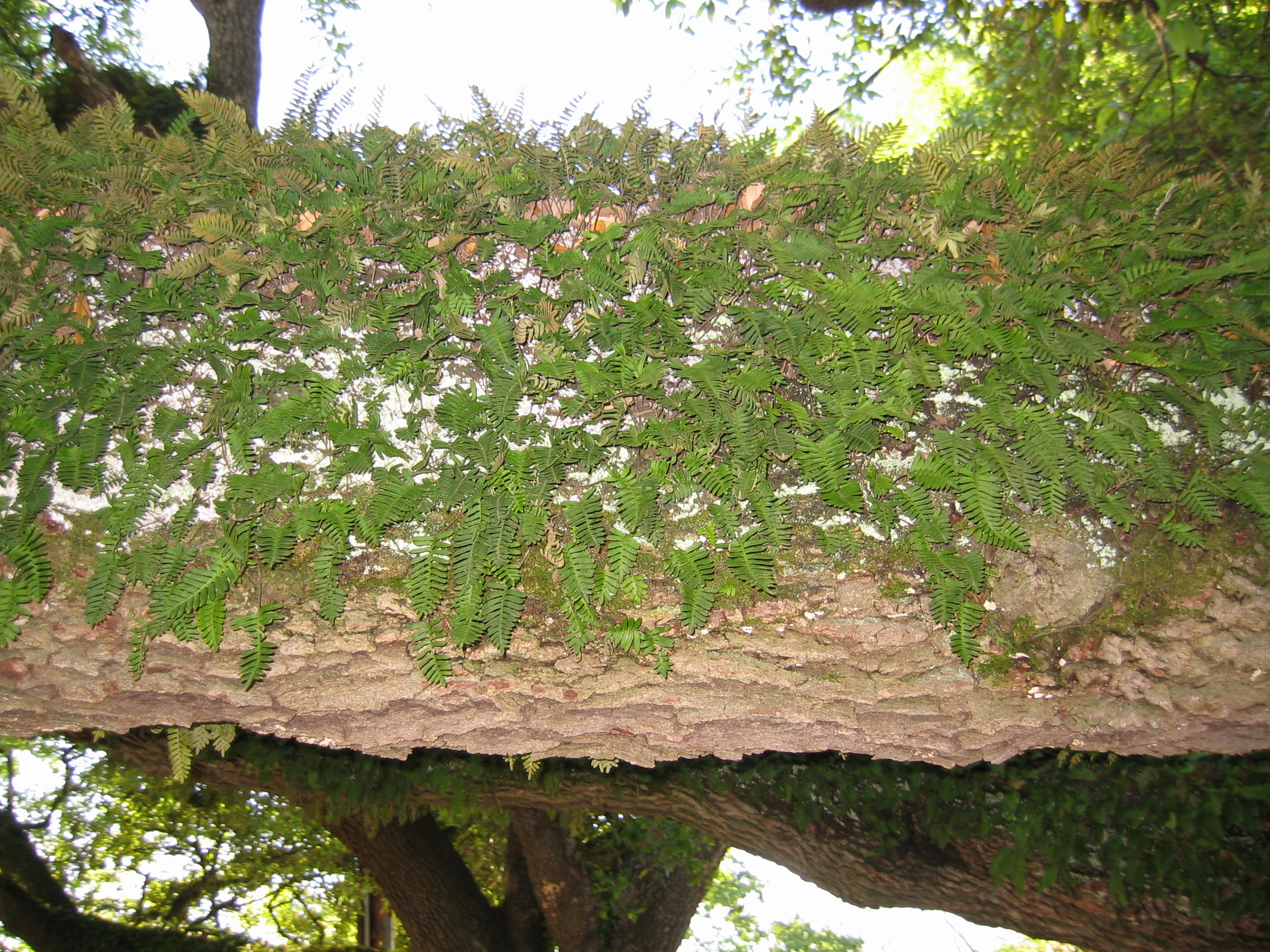
- Pleopeltis polypodioides fronds on an oak limb

Scientific classification
- Kingdom: Plantae
- Clade: Embryophytes
- Clade: Tracheophytes
- Division: Polypodiophyta
- Class: Polypodiopsida
- Order: Polypodiales
- Suborder: Polypodiineae
- Family: Polypodiaceae

Genera
- See text

Synonyms
- Drynariaceae Ching 1978; Grammitidaceae Newman 1840; Gymnogrammitidaceae Ching 1966; Loxogrammaceae Ching ex Pichi-Sermolli 1975; Platyceriaceae Ching 1940; Pleurisoriopsidaceae Kurita & Ikebe ex Ching 1978

= Polypodiaceae =

Family of ferns

Polypodiaceae is a family of ferns. In the Pteridophyte Phylogeny Group classification of 2016 (PPG I), the family includes around 65 genera and an estimated 1,650 species and is placed in the order Polypodiales, suborder Polypodiineae. A broader circumscription has also been used, in which the family includes other families kept separate in PPG I. Nearly all species are epiphytes, but some are terrestrial.

== Description ==
Stems of Polypodiaceae range from erect to long-creeping. The fronds are entire, pinnatifid, or variously forked or pinnate. The petioles lack stipules. The scaly rhizomes are generally creeping in nature. Polypodiaceae species are found in wet climates, most commonly in rain forests. In temperate zones, most species tend to be epiphytic or epipetric.

Notable examples of ferns in this family include the resurrection fern (Pleopeltis polypodioides) and the golden serpent fern (Phlebodium aureum).

== Taxonomy ==
Two distinct circumscriptions of the family are in use. The Pteridophyte Phylogeny Group classification of 2016 (PPG I) uses a circumscription of Polypodiaceae in which the family is placed in the suborder Polypodiineae (eupolypods I), along with eight other families. The relationship between the families is shown in the consensus cladogram below.

- Polypodiineae (eupolypods I)
  - Didymochlaenaceae
  - - Hypodematiaceae
    - - Dryopteridaceae
      - - - Nephrolepidaceae
          - Lomariopsidaceae
        - - Tectariaceae
          - - Oleandraceae
            - - Davalliaceae
              - Polypodiaceae

An alternative approach treats the suborder Polypodiineae as the family Polypodiaceae sensu lato, and reduces the families to subfamilies, so that the Polypodiaceae sensu stricto becomes the subfamily Polypodioideae. The broader circumscription is used by Plants of the World Online, as of August 2019; for example, the Dryopteridaceae, shown above as a separate family, is included in its Polypodiaceae. The broadly defined Polypodiaceae has been described as an "unwieldy megafamily".

=== Subfamilies ===
Molecular phylogenetic analysis has led to the division of the Polypodiaceae into six subfamilies, and to the inclusion of genera that have at various times been placed in other families, including the Drynariaceae, Grammitidaceae, Gymnogrammitidaceae, Loxogrammaceae, Platyceriaceae, and Pleurisoriopsidaceae. The following cladogram shows a possible phylogenetic relationship between the subfamilies based on an analysis published in 2008; at the time, Grammitidoideae was not separated from Polypodioideae.

- Polypodiaceae
  - Loxogrammoideae Schneid. 2011
  - - - Drynarioideae Crabbe, Jermy & Mickel 1975
      - - Platycerioideae Nayar 1970
        - Microsoroideae
          - Thylacoptereae Chen & Schneider 2019
          - - Goniophlebieae Chen & Schneider 2019
            - - Lecanopterideae Chen & Schneider 2019
              - - Microsoreae Tu 1981
                - Lepisoreae Ching ex Hennipman, Veldhoen & Kramer 1990
    - - Polypodioideae Sweet 1826
      - - Campyloneuroideae Zhang & Wei 2022
        - - Adetogrammoideae Zhang & Wei 2022
          - - Serpocauloideae Zhang & Wei 2022
            - Grammitidoideae Link 1841

The subfamilies are treated as tribes in other systems. Mabberley, in 2008, treated all of Polypodiaceae except for the Platycerioideae (Platycerium and Pyrrosia) and the grammitid ferns, which he placed in Grammitidaceae, as the subfamily Polypodioideae, which he then divided into six tribes, four of which correspond to PPG I subfamilies (Drynarieae, Loxogrammeae, Microsoreae and Polypodieae) and others of which have been submerged (Selligueeae, now within Drynarioideae, and Lepisoreae, now within Microsoroideae). Other systems also treat the subfamilies as tribes. The equivalence is shown in the following table.

PPG I	Christenhusz & Chase (2014)
Family Polypodiaceae J.Presl & C.Presl	Subfamily Polypodioideae B.K.Nayar
Subfamily Loxogrammoideae H.Schneid.	Tribe Loxogrammeae R.M.Tryon & A.F.Tryon
Subfamily Platycerioideae B.K.Nayar	Tribe Platycerieae Christenh.
Subfamily Drynarioideae Crabbe, Jermy & Mickel	Tribe Drynarieae Chandra
Subfamily Microsoroideae B.K.Nayar	Tribe Microsoreae V.N.Tu
Subfamily Polypodioideae Sweet	Tribe Polypodieae Hook. & Lindl. ex Duby
Subfamily Grammitidoideae Parris & Sundue	Tribe Polypodieae Hook. & Lindl. ex Duby

=== Phylogeny ===
In the list that follows, the taxa shown with the "(=)" prefix are considered to be synonyms for the accepted subfamily name that they follow. However, this does not necessarily imply that the subfamily contains all of the synonym's previous genera.

Phylogeny of Polypodiaceae

- - - Loxogrammoideae
      - Dictymia
      - Loxogramme
  - - - Platycerioideae
        - - Hovenkampia
          - Platycerium
        - Pyrrosia
      - Microsoroideae
        - - Thylacoptereae
            Thylacopteris
        - - - Goniophlebieae
              Goniophlebium
          - - - - Lecanopterideae
                  ⊞
                  ⊟
                  - Bosmania
                  - - Dendroconche
                    - - Zealandia
                      - Lecanopteris
            - - - Microsoreae
                  - Microsorum
                  - - Microsorum species-group 2
                    - Leptochilus
              - - Lepisoreae
                  ⊞
                  ⊟
                  - Paragramma
                  - - Ellipinema
                    - - - Lemmaphyllum
                        - - Neolepisorus
                          - - Tricholepidium
                            - - Neocheiropteris
                              - Lepidomicrosorium
                      - Lepisorus
    - - - Drynarioideae
          - Syngramma
          - - Drynaria
            - Selliguea
      - - - - - Polypodioideae
                ⊞
                ⊟
                - - Pleurosoriopsis
                  - Polypodium
                - - - Phlebodium
                    - Pecluma
                  - Pleopeltis
        - - - Campyloneuroideae
              - Microgramma
              - - Niphidium
                - Campyloneurum
          - - - Adetogrammoideae
                Adetogramma
            - - - Serpocauloideae
                  Serpocaulon
              - - Grammitidoideae
                  ⊞
                  ⊟
                  - - Terpsichore
                    - - - Parrisia
                        - Adenophorus
                      - - - Lomaphlebia
                          - Grammitis species-group 2
                        - - Cochlidium
                          - Grammitis
                  - - - Leucotrichum
                      - Alansmia
                    - - - Enterosora
                        - Ceradenia
                      - - - Ascogrammitis
                          - - Mycopteris
                            - - Galactodenia
                              - - Melpomene
                                - - Stenogrammitis
                                  - Lellingeria
                        - - Moranopteris
                          - - - Chrysogrammitis
                              - - Rouhania
                                - Nanogrammitis
                            - - - - Archigrammitis
                                  - - Oxygrammitis
                                    - Xiphopterella
                                - - Dasygrammitis
                                  - - - Micropolypodium
                                      - Calymmodon
                                    - - Devolia
                                      - - Scleroglossum
                                        - - Boonkerdia
                                          - Tomophyllum
                              - - Aenigmatogrammitis
                                - - - Ctenopterella
                                    - - - Grammitastrum
                                        - - Thalassogrammitis
                                          - - Howeogrammitis
                                            - Grammitis species-group 4
                                      - Notogrammitis
                                  - - - - Calligrammitis
                                        - Oreogrammitis species-group 2
                                      - Glabrigrammitis
                                    - - - Prosaptia nutans
                                        - - Oreogrammitis flavovirens
                                          - - Archigrammitis species-group 2
                                            - Prosaptia
                                      - Oreogrammitis

- Subfamily Adetogrammoideae Zhang & Wei
  - Adetogramma Almeida
- Subfamily Campyloneuroideae Zhang & Wei
  - Campyloneurum C.Presl
  - Microgramma C.Presl
  - Niphidium J.Sm.

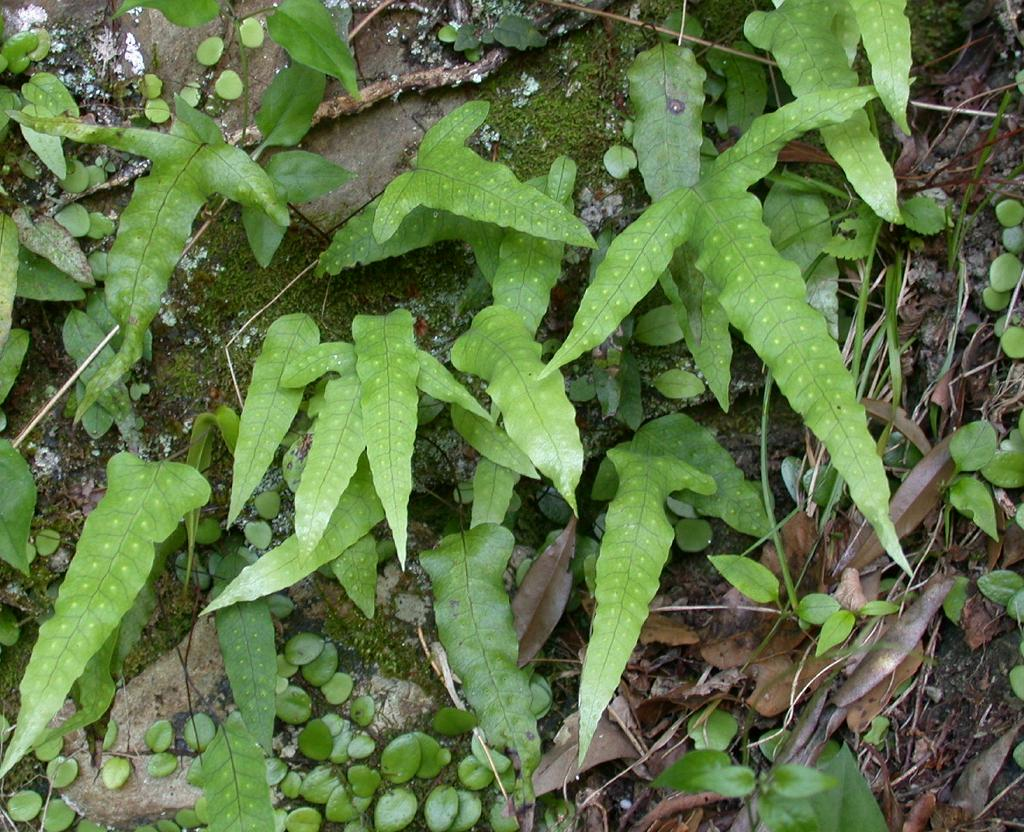
Selliguea hastata

- Subfamily Drynarioideae Crabbe, Jermy & Mickel (Drynarieae Subh.Chandra; Selligueeae Hennipman; Aglaomorpheae Chandra; Crypsinoideae Nayar)
  - Drynaria (Bory 1825) Smith [Aglaomorpha]
  - Pichisermollodes Fraser-Jenk. & Challis.
  - Selliguea Bory [Arthromeris; Gymnogrammitis; Paraselliguea; Polypodiopteris]
  - ×Sellimeris Fraser-Jenkins, Singh & Fraser-Jenkins
  - Synammia C.Presl

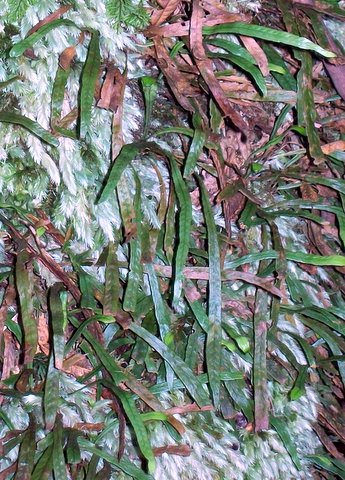
Grammitis billardierei

- Subfamily Grammitidoideae Parris & Sundue [Grammitideae Presl; Mecosoreae Klotzsch; Pleurogrammeae Fée ex Pfeiffer]

- Acrosorus Copel.
- Adenophorus Gaudich.
- Alansmia M.Kessler, Moguel, Sundue & Labiak
- Archigrammitis Parris
- Ascogrammitis Sundue
- Calymmodon C.Presl
- Ceradenia L.E.Bishop
- Chrysogrammitis Parris
- Cochlidium Kaulf. [Xiphopteris Kaulfuss]
- Ctenopterella Parris
- Dasygrammitis Parris
- Enterosora Baker [Zygophlebia L.E.Bishop]
- Galactodenia Sundue & Labiak
- Grammitis Sw.
- Lellingeria A.R.Sm. & R.C.Moran
- Leucotrichum Labiak
- Lomaphlebia J.Sm.
- Luisma M.T.Murillo & A.R.Sm.
- Melpomene A.R.Sm. & R.C.Moran
- Micropolypodium Hayata
- Moranopteris R.Y.Hirai & J.Prado
- Mycopteris Sundue
- Notogrammitis Parris
- Oreogrammitis Copel. [Radiogrammitis Parris; Themelium (T.Moore) Parris]
- Parrisia Shalisko & Sundue
- Prosaptia C.Presl [Ctenopteris Blume ex Kunze non Brongniart ex de Saporta non Newman]
- Scleroglossum Alderw. [Nematopteris van Alderwerelt van Rosenburgh]
- Stenogrammitis Labiak
- Terpsichore A.R.Sm.
- Tomophyllum (E.Fourn.) Parris
- Xiphopterella Parris

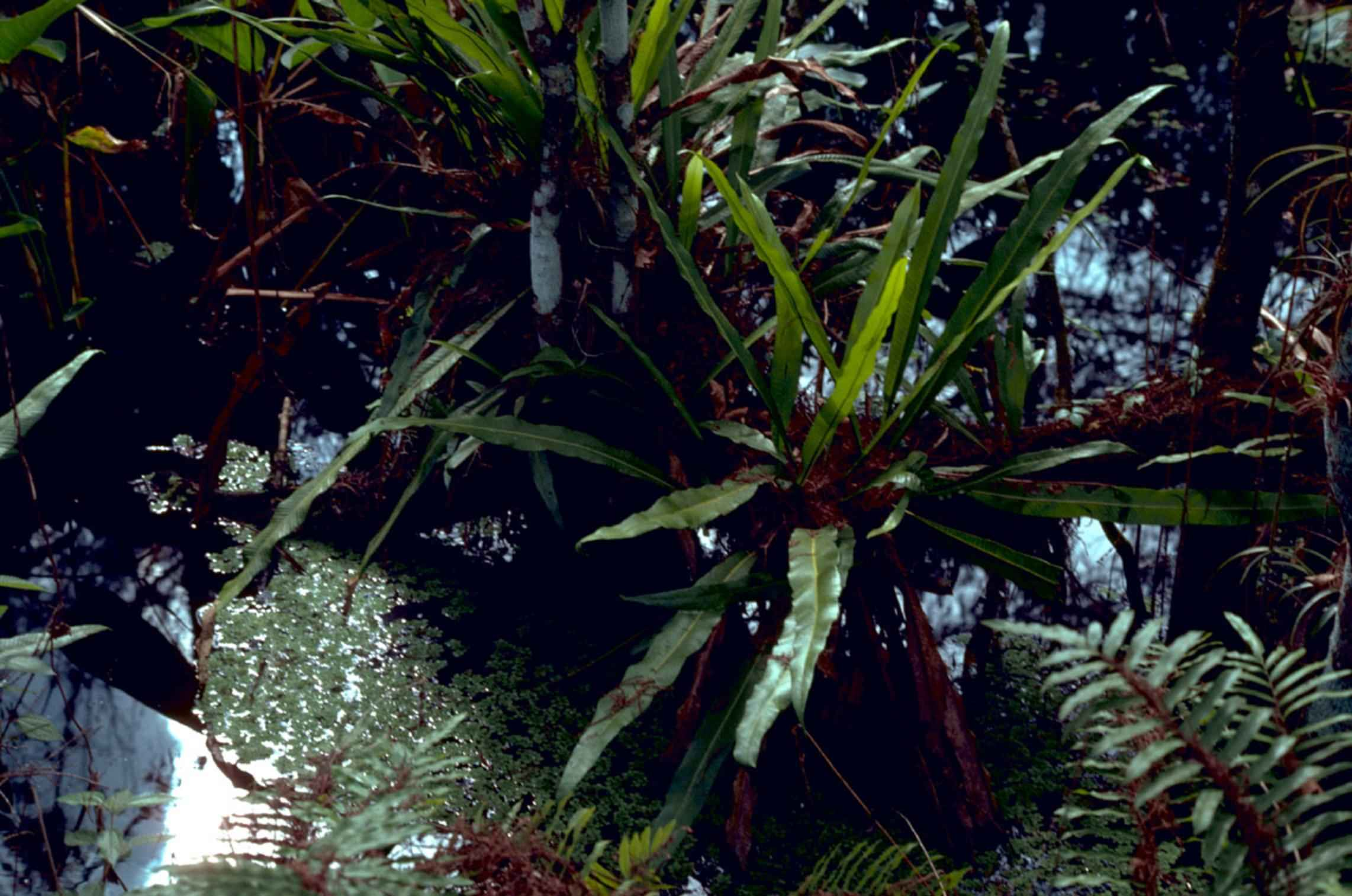
Dictymia mckeei

- Subfamily Loxogrammoideae H.Schneid. (Loxogrammeae R.M.Tryon & A.F.Tryon)

Lacks sclerenchyma (supporting tissue) in plant body, except in the roots.
- Dictymia J.Sm.
- Loxogramme (Blume) C.Presl

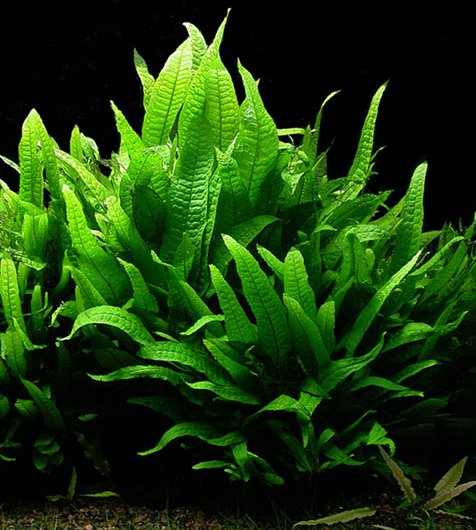
Microsorum pteropus

- Subfamily Microsoroideae B.K.Nayar (Lepisoroideae Ching; Microsoreae V.N.Tu; Lemmaphylleae Tu)

- Bosmania Testo
- Dendroconche Copel.
- Ellipinema Zhang & Zhang
- Goniophlebium (Blume) C.Presl
- Lecanopteris Reinw. ex Blume
- Lemmaphyllum C.Presl
- Lepidomicrosorium Ching & K.H.Shing
- Lepisorus (J.Sm.) Ching
- Leptochilus Kaulf. [Kontumia Wu & Lôc]
- Microsorum Link [Kaulinia Nayar]
- Neocheiropteris Christ.
- Neolepisorus Ching
- Paragramma (Blume) T.Moore
- Phymatosorus Pichi-Sermolli
- Podosorus Holttum
- Thylacopteris Kunze ex J.Sm.
- Tricholepidium Ching
- Zealandia Testo

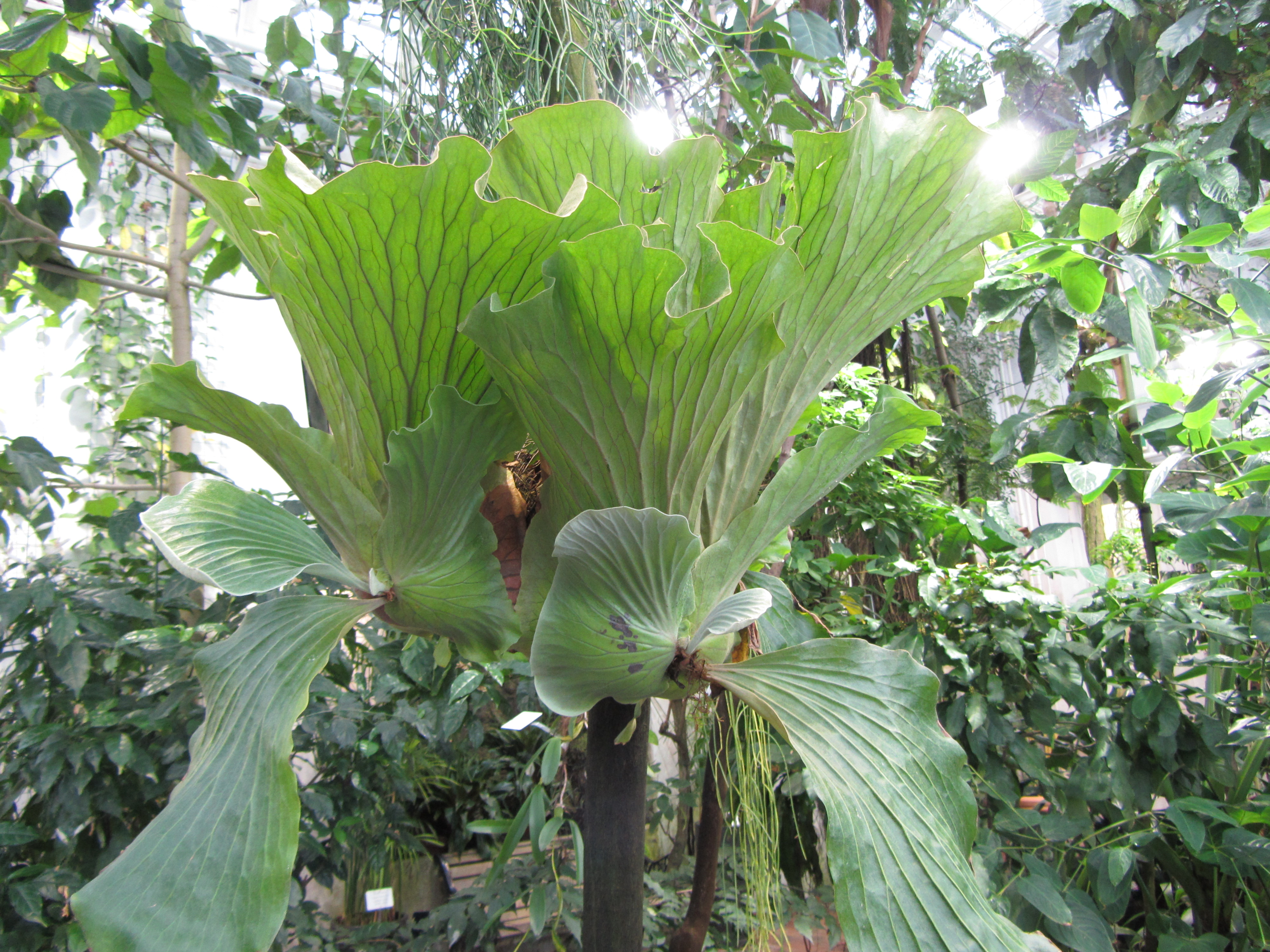
Platycerium elephantotis

- Subfamily Platycerioideae B.K.Nayar (Platycerieae Christenhusz)

Fronds with stellate hairs (star-shaped, radiating from center).
- Hovenkampia Zhang & Zhou
- Platycerium Desv.
- Pyrrosia Mirb.

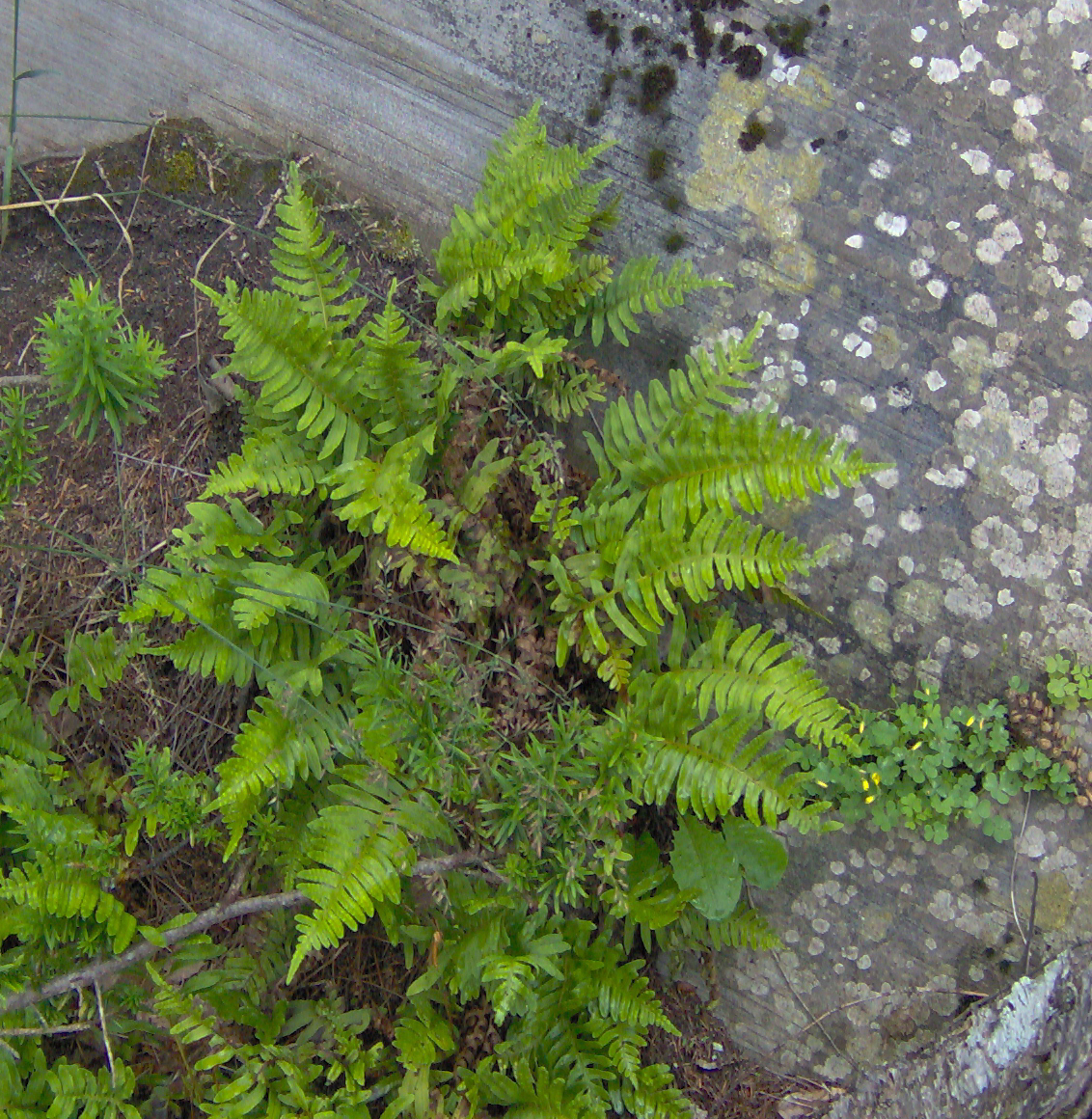
Polypodium appalachianum

- Subfamily Polypodioideae Sweet (Polypodieae Hooker & Lindley ex Duby (sensu Mabberley 2008))

- Pecluma M.G.Price.
- Phlebodium (R.Br.) J.Sm.
- ×Phlebosia Viane & Pompe
- Pleopeltis Humb. & Bonpl. ex Willd.
- Pleurosoriopsis Fomin
- Polypodium L. Perhaps

- Subfamily Serpocauloideae Zhang & Wei
  - Serpocaulon A.R.Sm.

== See also ==
- List of foliage plant diseases (Polypodiaceae)
