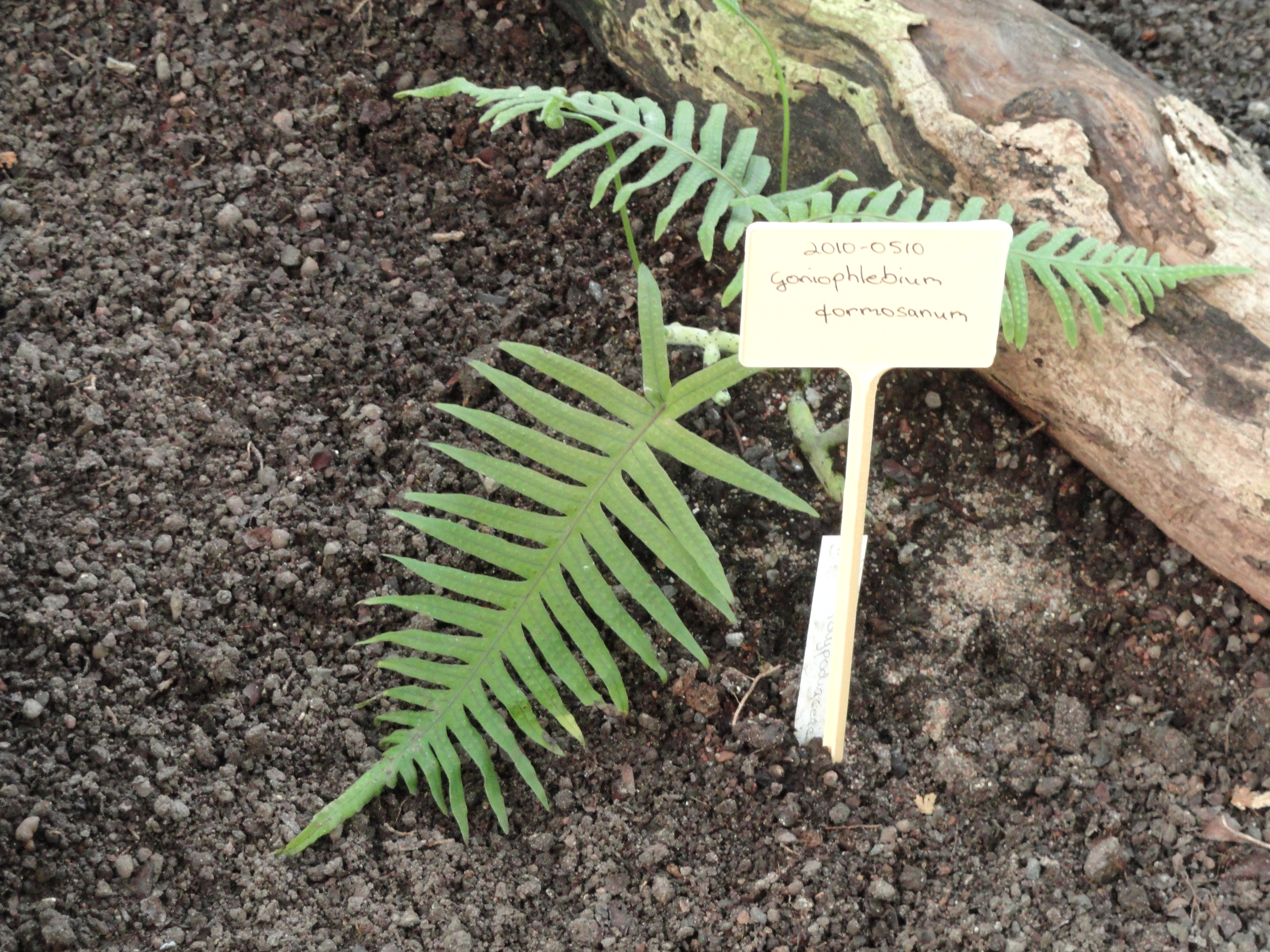
- Goniophlebium formosanum

Scientific classification
- Kingdom: Plantae
- Clade: Tracheophytes
- Division: Polypodiophyta
- Class: Polypodiopsida
- Order: Polypodiales
- Suborder: Polypodiineae
- Family: Polypodiaceae
- Subfamily: Microsoroideae
- Genus: Goniophlebium (Blume) C.Presl

Synonyms
- Metapolypodium Ching; Polypodiastrum Ching; Polypodiodes Ching

= Goniophlebium =

Genus of ferns

Goniophlebium is a genus of ferns in the family Polypodiaceae, subfamily Microsoroideae, according to the Pteridophyte Phylogeny Group classification of 2016 (PPG I).

== Taxonomy ==
A molecular phylogenetic study in 2019 suggested that Goniophlebium was sister to the rest of the subfamily Microsoroideae:

- Microsoroideae
  - Goniophlebium
  - - - - - Lemmaphyllum
          - Lepidomicrosorium + Neocheiropteris + Neolepisorus + Tricholepidium
        - - Lepisorus
          - Paragramma (as Lepisorus longifolius)
      - - Microsorum
        - Leptochilus
    - - Bosmania
      - - Dendroconche
        - - Zealandia
          - Lecanopteris

=== Species ===
The Pteridophyte Phylogeny Group classification of 2016 (PPG I) states that the genus has 25 species. As of August 2019, Plants of the World Online accepted 26 species:

- Goniophlebium amoenum (Wall. ex Mett.) Bedd.
- Goniophlebium argutum J.Sm.
- Goniophlebium benguetense (Copel.) Copel.
- Goniophlebium bourretii (C.Chr. & Tardieu) X.C.Zhang
- Goniophlebium chinense (Christ) X.C.Zhang
- Goniophlebium coadunatum Barcelona & M.G.Price
- Goniophlebium demersum (Brause) Rödl-Linder
- Goniophlebium dielseanum (C.Chr.) Rödl-Linder
- Goniophlebium fieldingianum (Kunze ex Mett.) T.Moore
- Goniophlebium formosanum (Baker) Rödl-Linder
- Goniophlebium hendersonii Bedd.
- Goniophlebium korthalsii Bedd.
- Goniophlebium lachnopus (Wall. ex Hook.) J.Sm.
- Goniophlebium manmeiense (Christ) Rödl-Linder
- Goniophlebium mehipitense (C.Chr.) Parris
- Goniophlebium mengtzeense (Christ) G.Roedl-Linder
- Goniophlebium percussum (Cav.) W.H.Wagner & Grether
- Goniophlebium persicifolium Bedd.
- Goniophlebium prainii Bedd.
- Goniophlebium pseudoconnatum (Copel.) Copel.
- Goniophlebium rajaense (C.Chr.) Parris
- Goniophlebium serratifolium Brack.
- Goniophlebium someyae (Yatabe) Ebihara
- Goniophlebium subamoenum (C.B.Clarke) Bedd.
- Goniophlebium subauriculatum (Blume) C.Presl
- Goniophlebium terrestre Copel.
