= Dendroconche annabellae =

Scientific classification
- Kingdom: Plantae
- Clade: Tracheophytes
- Division: Polypodiophyta
- Class: Polypodiopsida
- Order: Polypodiales
- Suborder: Polypodiineae
- Family: Polypodiaceae
- Genus: Dendroconche
- Species: D. annabellae

Binomial name
- Dendroconche annabellae (H.O.Forbes) Copel.

Synonyms
- Polypodium cyclobasis Baker; Pleopeltis annabellae (H.O.Forbes) Alderw.; Polypodium annabellae H.O.Forbes

Species of fern

Dendroconche annabellae is a species of fern in the family Polypodiaceae, subfamily Microsoroideae. It is endemic to Papua New Guinea.

== Description ==
Dendroconche annabellae has a partially epiphytic habit. It grows from long, creeping rhizomes, that are flattened from top to bottom and have occasional cavities. The rhizomes have dark brown scales, 4–7 mm long and 1.5–2.5 mm wide. Two kinds of root are produced by the rhizomes. Lateral roots clasp the tree on which the plant is growing. Roots emerging from the underside of the rhizome enter the soil. Leaves that do not produce spores (sterile leaves) are more or less circular in outline, 8–12 cm across, with at most a very short petiole, and are tightly pressed against the trunk of the supporting tree. The spore-bearing leaves (fertile leaves) have the same shape at the base, but then have a long narrow "tail", up to 28 cm long and 1 cm across, which curves away from the tree trunk and bears the round sori in a single row. All the leaves have prominent veins.

The shape of the fertile leaves distinguishes D. annabellae from the related D. kingii and D. linguiforme. Fertile leaves of D. kingii have a wider "tail", 2–5 cm wide rather than less than 1.5 cm wide. The fertile leaves of D. kingii lack the conspicuously rounded basal portion, being lanceolate or with a narrowed central portion.

== Taxonomy ==
Dendroconche annabellae was first described by Henry Ogg Forbes in 1825 as Polypodium annabellae. In 1911, Edwin Copeland transferred it to his new genus Dendroconche as the type species; initially it was the only species in the genus. The orb-shaped leaves that tightly clasp the tree on which the plant grows were a major distinguishing feature. Copeland later included another species in the genus as D. kingii. Subsequently, both species were placed in the genus Microsorum and relegated to synonyms of what was then considered to be M. linguiforme. Studies from 2006 onwards showed that Microsorum was not monophyletic and that M. linguiforme was more closely related to Lecanopteris. The genus Dendroconche was revived in 2019 as a result of a molecular phylogenetic study, and Copeland's two species, including D. annabellae, distinguished from Dendroconche linguiforme.

== Distribution and habitat ==
Dendroconche annabellae is endemic to the island of New Guinea, more specifically to Papua New Guinea, where it is found at elevations of 500–1300 m.
