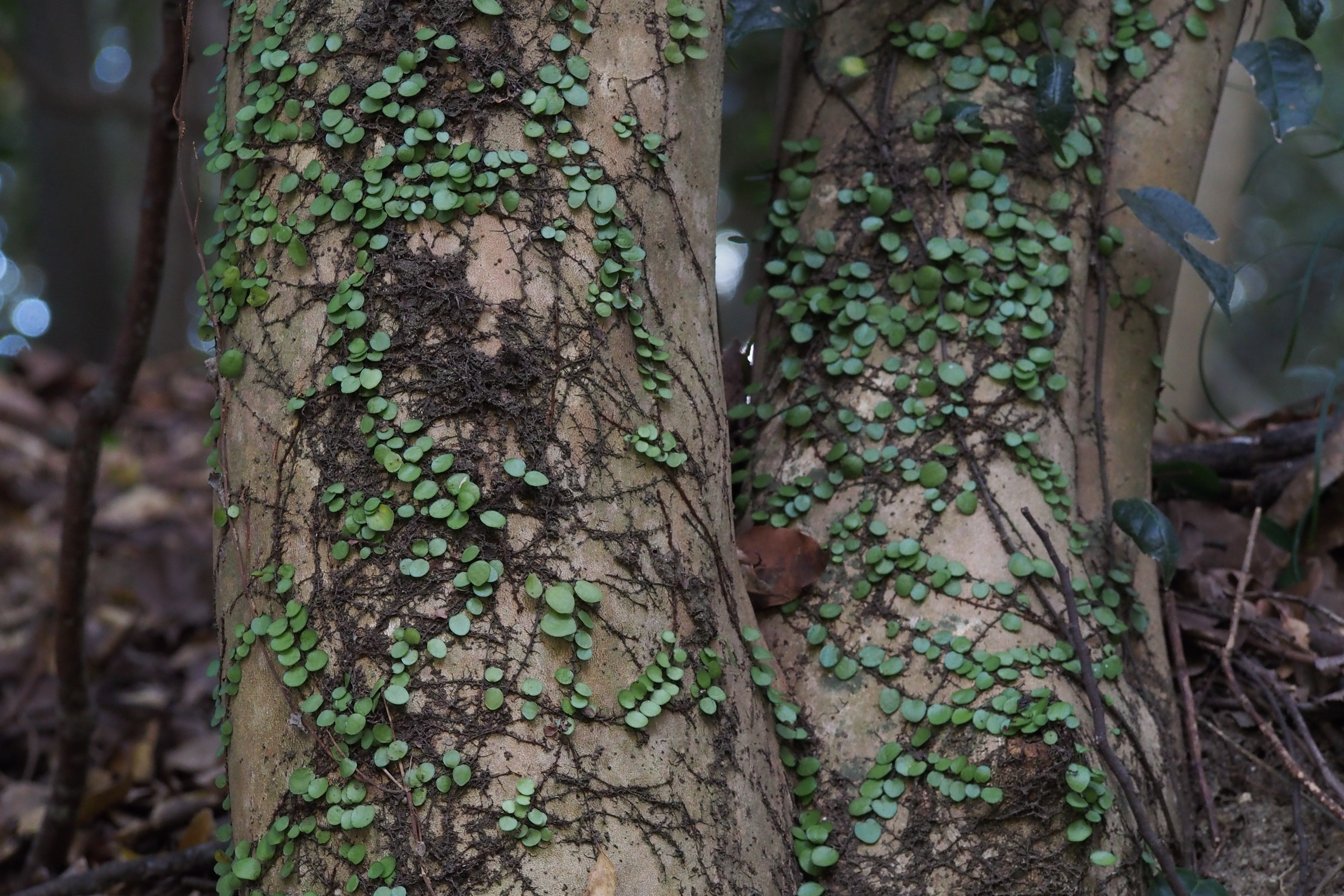
- Lemmaphyllum microphyllum, Kobe, Japan

Scientific classification
- Kingdom: Plantae
- Clade: Tracheophytes
- Division: Polypodiophyta
- Class: Polypodiopsida
- Order: Polypodiales
- Suborder: Polypodiineae
- Family: Polypodiaceae
- Subfamily: Microsoroideae
- Genus: Lemmaphyllum; C.Presl

Species
- See text.

Synonyms
- Caobangia A.R.Sm. & X.C.Zhang; Lepidogrammitis Ching; Pleopeltis sect. Phlebodiopsis Moore

= Lemmaphyllum =

Genus of ferns

Lemmaphyllum is a genus of ferns in the family Polypodiaceae, subfamily Microsoroideae, according to the Pteridophyte Phylogeny Group classification of 2016 (PPG I).

== Taxonomy ==
Lemmaphyllum was first described by Carl Presl in 1851. A molecular phylogenetic study in 2019 suggested that Lemmaphyllum was one of a group of closely related genera in the subfamily Microsoroideae; a group the authors termed "Lepisorus sensu lato".

- Lepisorus s.l.
  - - Lemmaphyllum
    - Lepidomicrosorium + Neocheiropteris + Neolepisorus + Tricholepidium
  - - Lepisorus s.s.
    - Paragramma (as Lepisorus longifolius)

=== Species ===
As of February 2020, the Checklist of Ferns and Lycophytes of the World recognized the following species:

- Lemmaphyllum carnosum (Wall. ex J.Sm.) C.Presl
- Lemmaphyllum diversum (Rosenst.) Tagawa
- Lemmaphyllum drymoglossoides (Baker) Ching
- Lemmaphyllum microphyllum C.Presl
- Lemmaphyllum rostratum (Bedd.) Tagawa
- Lemmaphyllum squamatum (A.R.Sm. & X.C.Zhang) Li Wang

Plants of the World Online also accepted Lemmaphyllum accedens (Blume) Donk, which the Checklist of Ferns and Lycophytes of the World placed in Lepisorus.
