= Richard Maack =

Russian explorer and botanist (1825–1886)

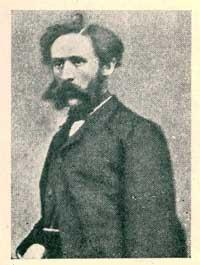
- Born: 4 September 1825; Kuressaare, Governorate of Livonia, Russian Empire
- Died: 25 November 1886 (aged 61); Saint Petersburg, Russia
- Occupations: Naturalist; geographer; botanist; educator

Richard Otto Maack (Russian: Ричард Карлович Маак, romanized: Richard Karlovich Maak; 4 September 1825 – 25 November 1886) was a Russian naturalist, geographer, and anthropologist. He is most known for his exploration of the Russian Far East and Siberia, particularly the Ussuri and Amur River valleys. He wrote some of the first scientific descriptions of the natural history of remote Siberia and collected many biological specimens, many of which were original type specimens of previously unknown species.

Ethnically Maack was a Baltic German from Estonia; however, the Russian Empire controlled this country during his lifetime. He was a member of the Siberian branch of the Russian Geographical Society.

== Biography ==
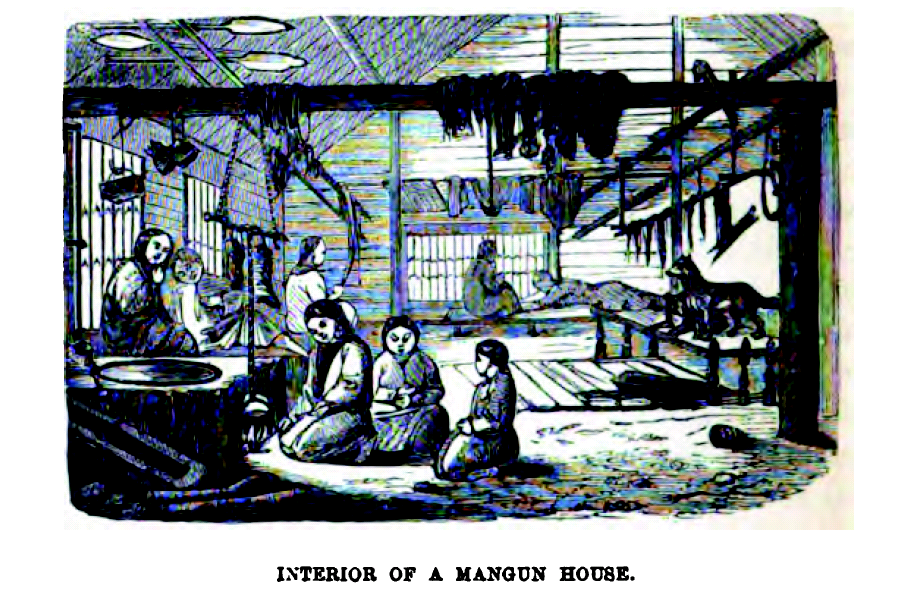
"Interior of a Mangun House", drawing by R. Maack

Maack was born in Kuressaare, Estonia and studied natural sciences at the University of St. Petersburg. In 1852 he became a professor of natural sciences at the Gymnasium in Irkutsk and later director of the school. From 1868 to 1879, he was the superintendent of all schools of northern Siberia.

During the 1850s he undertook a number of expeditions in Siberia including those to the Amur River valley (1855–1856) and the Ussuri River (1859). He also participated in the Russian Geographical Society's first expedition (1853–55) to describe the orography, geology and population of the Vilyuy and Chona River basins.

He is credited with discovering Syringa reticulata var. amurensis simultaneously and independently of Carl Maximowicz.

== Plants named after him ==
Maack is most famous for collecting previously unknown species and sending specimens back for scientific descriptions and naming. A number of those he found on his Amur River expedition bear his name.

- Maackia amurensis — Amur maackia
- Lonicera maackii — Amur Honeysuckle
- Prunus maackii — Amur choke cherry
- Iris maackii — water tolerant Iris
- Aster maackii
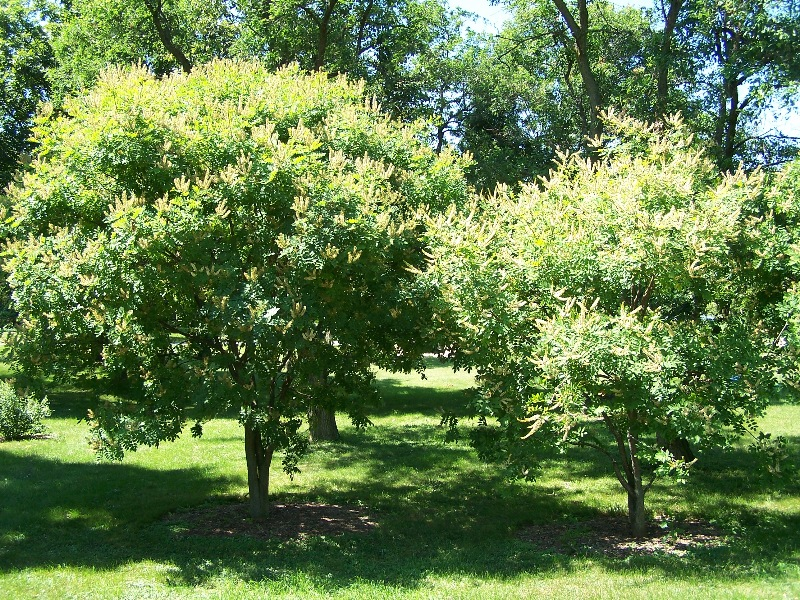
Amur maackia is a small tree.

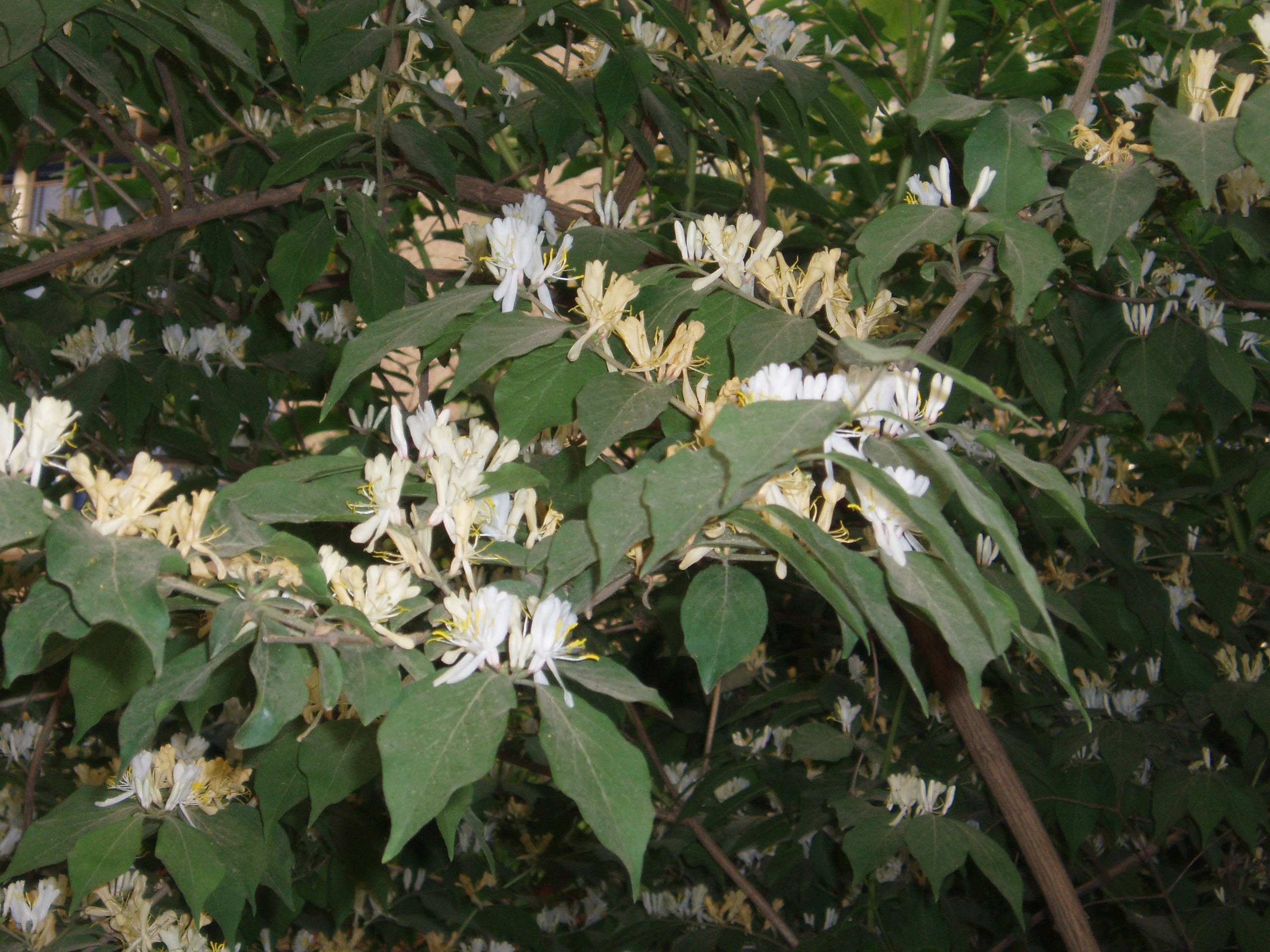
Amur Bush Honeysuckle

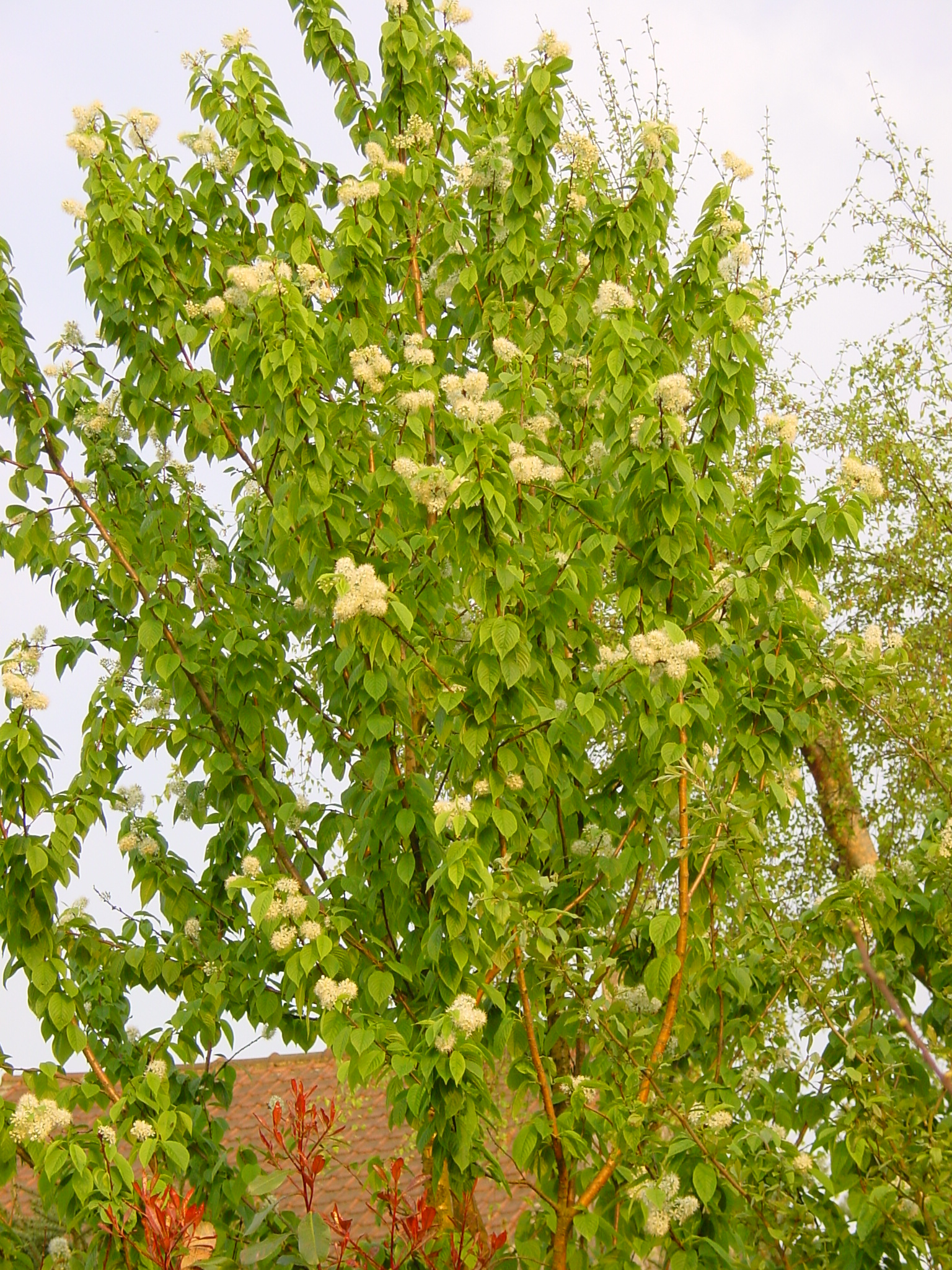
Amur choke cherry is a small tree.

== Animals named after him ==
- Pelodiscus maackii (Brandt, 1857) — Amur softshell turtle
- Papilio maackii (Ménétries, 1859) — Alpine black swallowtail

== Plants named by him ==
- Nymphaea tetragona var. wenzelii (Maack) F.Henkel et al.
- Pleopeltis ussuriensis Regel & Maack
- Rubia chinensis Regel & Maack

== Selected publications ==
- Puteshestvie na Amur/Путешествие на Амур (Travels on the Amur). 1859. St. Petersburg.
- Puteshestvie v dolinu reki Ussuri/Путешествие в долину реки Уссури (Journey through the Ussuri river valley). 1861. St. Petersburg.
- Вилюйский округ Якутской области (Vilyuysky District of Yakutsk Oblast) (1877–86)
- Очерк флоры Уссурийской страны (Essay about flora of Ussuri land). 1862.
- Енисейская губерния (Yenisei province) in the "List of settlements Russian Empire".

== Sources ==
- "Маак, Ричард Карлович" . Brockhaus and Efron Encyclopedic Dictionary (in Russian). 1906.
