= Lepisorus squamatus =

Scientific classification
- Kingdom: Plantae
- Clade: Tracheophytes
- Division: Polypodiophyta
- Class: Polypodiopsida
- Order: Polypodiales
- Suborder: Polypodiineae
- Family: Polypodiaceae
- Genus: Lepisorus
- Species: L. squamatus

Binomial name
- Lepisorus squamatus (A.R.Sm. & X.C.Zhang) C.F.Zhao, R.Wei & X.C.Zhang

Synonyms
- Lemmaphyllum squamatum (A.R.Sm. & X.C.Zhang) Li Wang; Caobangia squamata A.R.Sm. & X.C.Zhang

Species of fern

Lepisorus squamatus is a species of fern known only from Vietnam and from Guangxi Province in southern China. The plant is herbaceous, spreading by rhizomes. The leaves are simple, elliptical, and the sori are round, on the underside of the leaves. The spores are white.

The systematic position of the species varies. It was originally described in the monotypic genus Caobangia as Caobangia squamata. It has also been placed in Lemmaphyllum as Lemmaphyllum squamatum.
