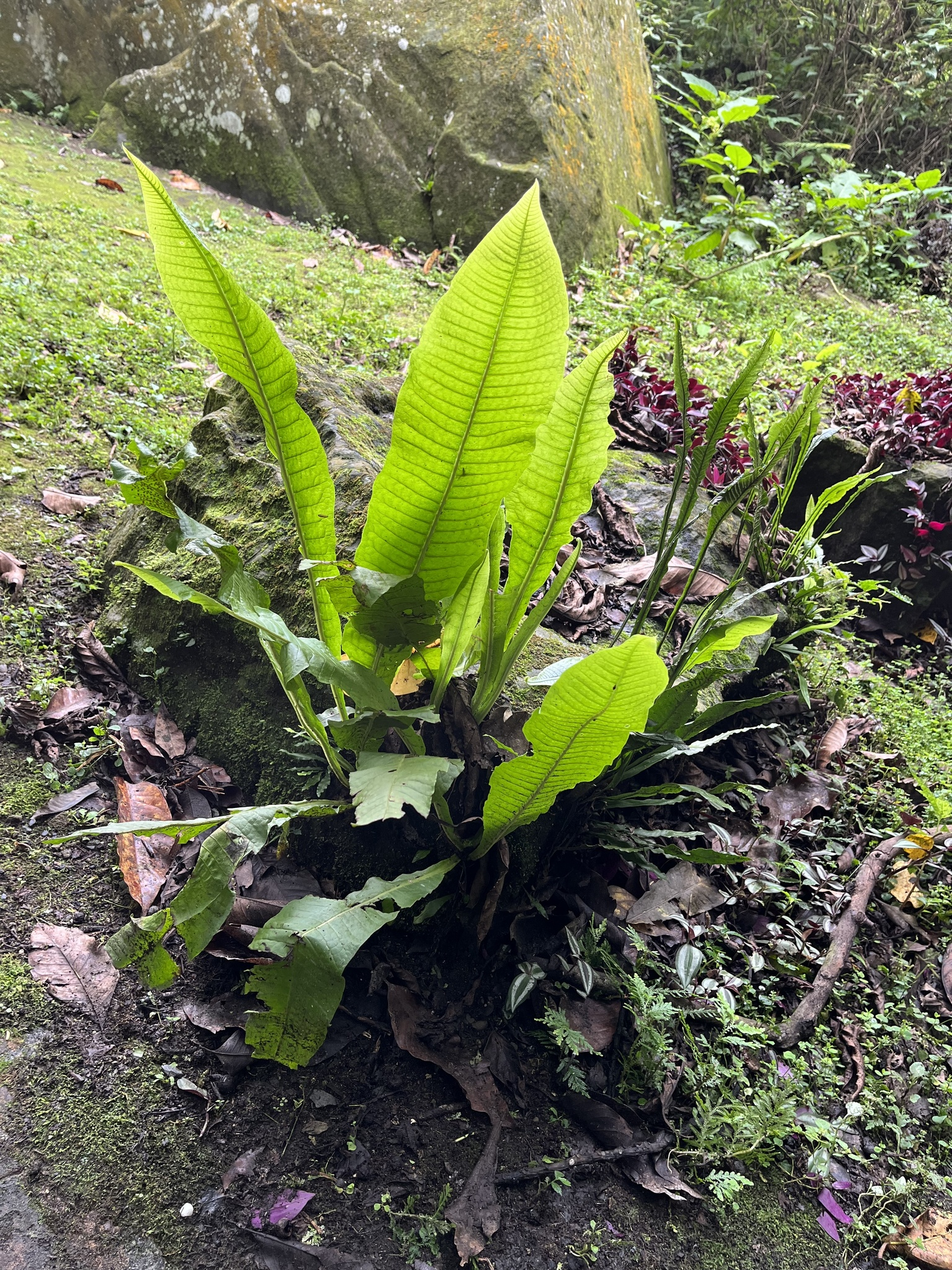

Scientific classification
- Kingdom: Plantae
- Clade: Tracheophytes
- Division: Polypodiophyta
- Class: Polypodiopsida
- Order: Polypodiales
- Suborder: Polypodiineae
- Family: Polypodiaceae
- Genus: Bosmania
- Species: B. membranacea

Binomial name
- Bosmania membranacea (D.Don) Testo

Synonyms
- List: Colysis membranacea (D.Don) J.Sm.; Lepidomicrosorium hymenodes (Kunze) L.Shi & X.C.Zhang; Microsorum carinatum (W.M.Chu & Z.R.He) S.G.Lu; Microsorum hymenodes (Kunze) Ching; Microsorum indicum Ching; Microsorum membranaceum (D.Don) Ching; Microsorum schneideri (Christ) Copel.; Phymatodes grandifolia (Wall.ex Christ) C.Presl; Pleopeltis grandifolia (Wall.ex Christ) T.Moore; Pleopeltis membranacea (D.Don) T.Moore; Pleopeltis nigricans (Alderw.) Alderw.; Pleopeltis rupestris var. nigricans Alderw.; Pleopeltis rupestris var. parallela Alderw.; Polypodium grandifolium Wall.; Polypodium huegelii Fée ex Ettingsh.; Polypodium hymenodes Kunze; Polypodium membranaceum D.Don; Polypodium nigricans Alderw.; Polypodium normale var. sumatranum Baker; Polypodium schneideri Christ; Polypodium transparens C.Presl ex Ettingsh.

= Bosmania membranacea =

Species of fern

Bosmania membranacea is a species of fern in the family Polypodiaceae, subfamily Microsoroideae. It is native to tropical and subtropical Asia, from India to Japan and south to Sulawesi.

== Taxonomy ==
Bosmania membranacea was first described by David Don in 1825 as Polypodium membranaceum. It has been known by many synonyms, including Microsorum membranaceum. It was transferred from Microsorum to the new genus Bosmania by Weston L. Testo in 2019 as a result of a molecular phylogenetic study.
