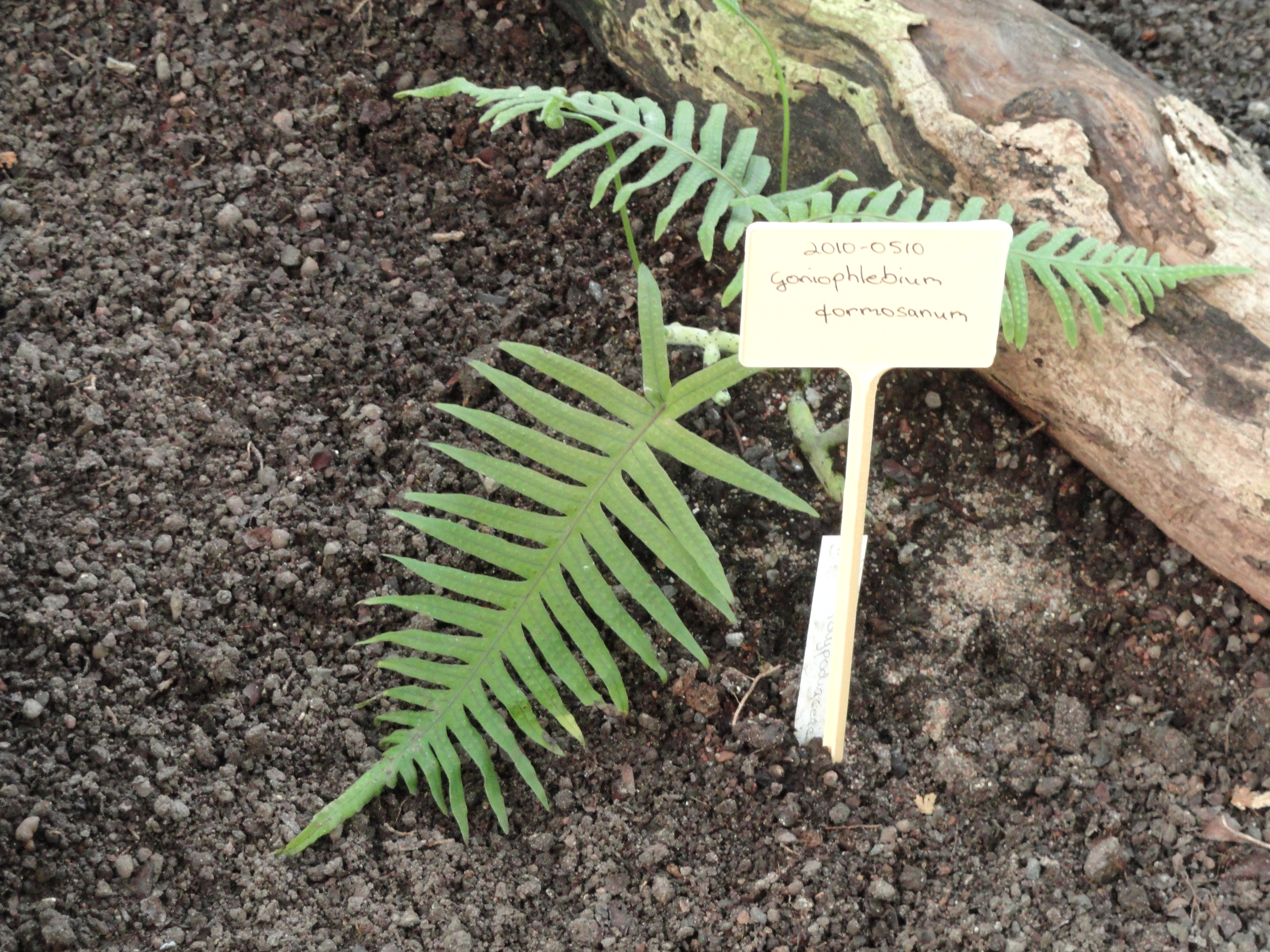

Scientific classification
- Kingdom: Plantae
- Clade: Tracheophytes
- Division: Polypodiophyta
- Class: Polypodiopsida
- Order: Polypodiales
- Suborder: Polypodiineae
- Family: Polypodiaceae
- Genus: Goniophlebium
- Species: G. formosanum

Binomial name
- Goniophlebium formosanum (Baker) Rödl-Linder

Synonyms
- Marginaria formosana (Baker) Nakai ex H.Itô; Polypodiodes formosana (Baker) Ching; Polypodium formosanum Baker; Polypodium liukiuense Christ

= Goniophlebium formosanum =

Species of fern

Goniophlebium formosanum is a species of fern in the family Polypodiaceae, found in Fujian (China), Japan and Taiwan. It is an epiphyte that grows on tree trunks or rocks, with straw-colored stipes, 15–20 cm in length, and oblong lamina approximately 30–50 × 10–15 cm in size.
