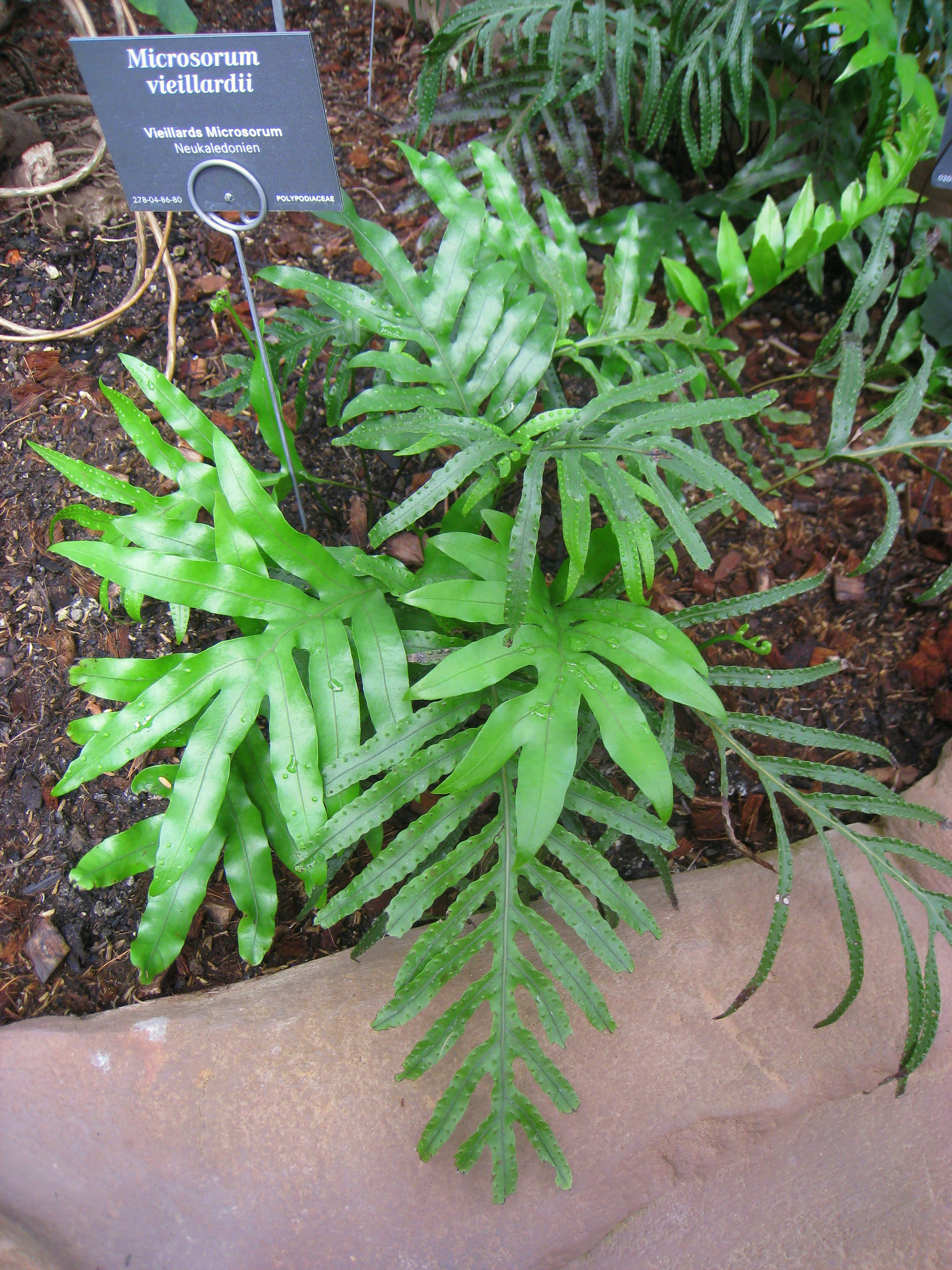

Scientific classification
- Kingdom: Plantae
- Clade: Tracheophytes
- Division: Polypodiophyta
- Class: Polypodiopsida
- Order: Polypodiales
- Suborder: Polypodiineae
- Family: Polypodiaceae
- Genus: Zealandia
- Species: Z. vieillardii

Binomial name
- Zealandia vieillardii (Mett.) Testo & A.R.Field

= Zealandia vieillardii =

Species of fern

Zealandia vieillardii, synonym Microsorum vieillardii, is a species of fern native to New Caledonia.
