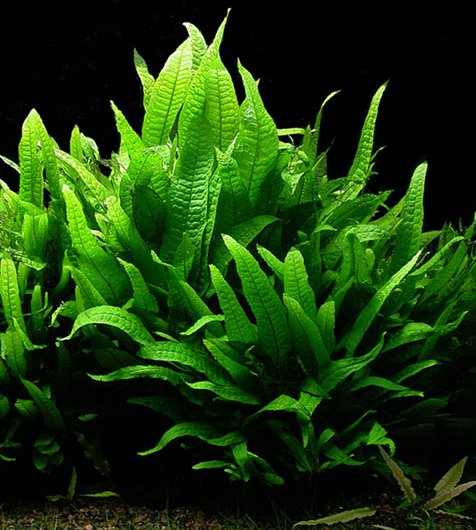

Scientific classification
- Kingdom: Plantae
- Clade: Embryophytes
- Clade: Tracheophytes
- Division: Polypodiophyta
- Class: Polypodiopsida
- Order: Polypodiales
- Suborder: Polypodiineae
- Family: Polypodiaceae
- Genus: Leptochilus
- Species: L. pteropus

Binomial name
- Leptochilus pteropus (Blume) Fraser-Jenk.

= Leptochilus pteropus =

Species of aquatic fern

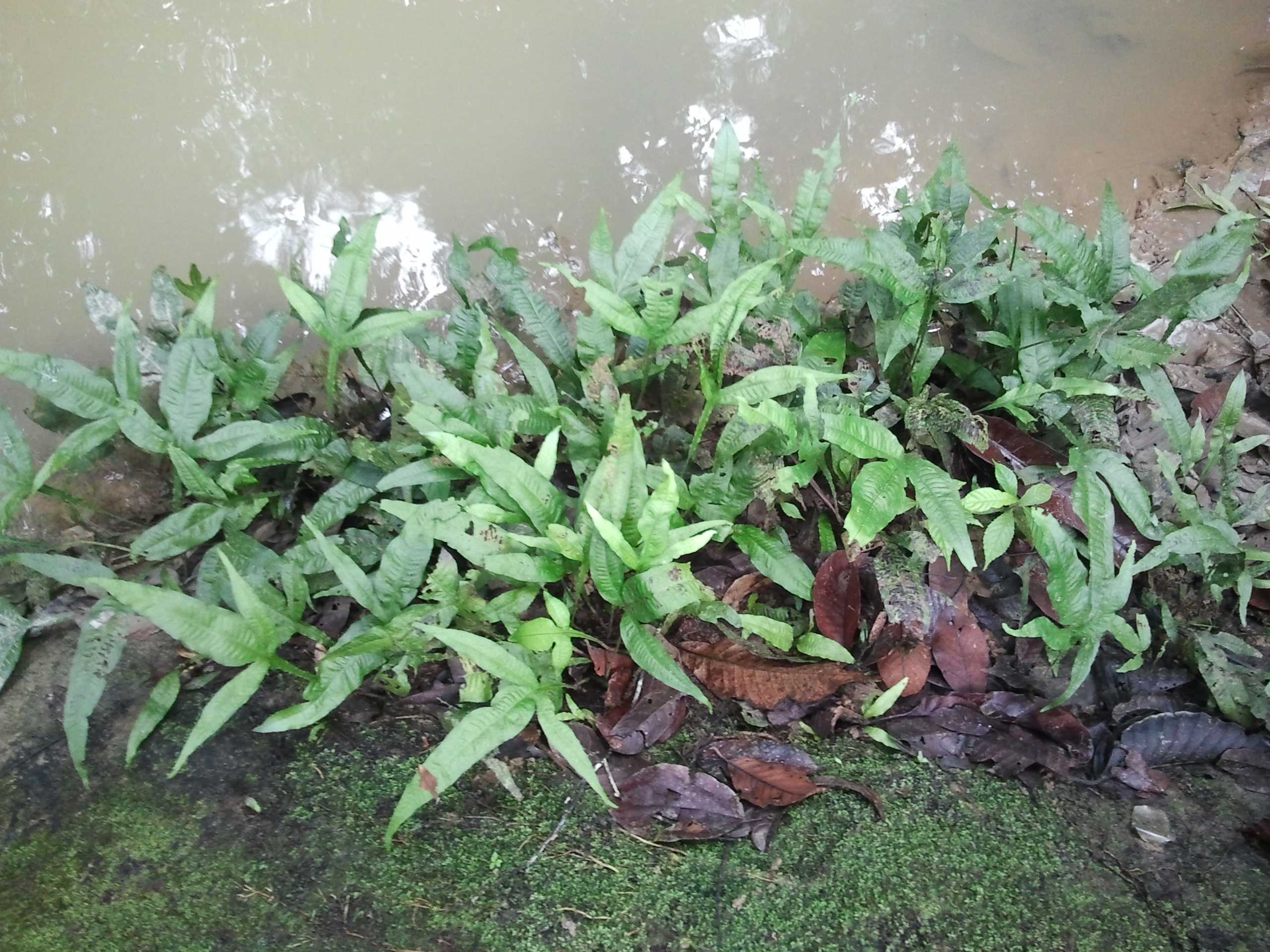
Growing in the west peninsula of Malaysia

Leptochilus pteropus (synonym Microsorum pteropus) is a species of aquatic or semi-aquatic fern, commonly known as Java fern (after the Indonesian island of Java). It is predominantly known from Malaysia, Thailand, Northeastern India and parts of South China. It is a highly variable plant, with several different geographic varieties and physical forms that vary in leaf size, texture and shape (such as the crested-leaved 'Windelov' or 'Trident' varieties). Found in its natural habitat growing attached to riparian roots and rocks, it can grow fully or partially submerged, provided its roots and rhizome remain wet. The plant will readily propagate asexually by producing small, adventitious plantlets from the leaf tips and margins of established, mature foliage. The small sprouts quickly develop roots of their own, and, if water currents facilitate it, may attach themselves to surrounding objects before the "mother" leaf expires. In the event that the mother leaf wilts or detaches prior to the plantlet establishing itself, the small fern will float on its own to a new location to start anew.

== Cultivation and uses ==
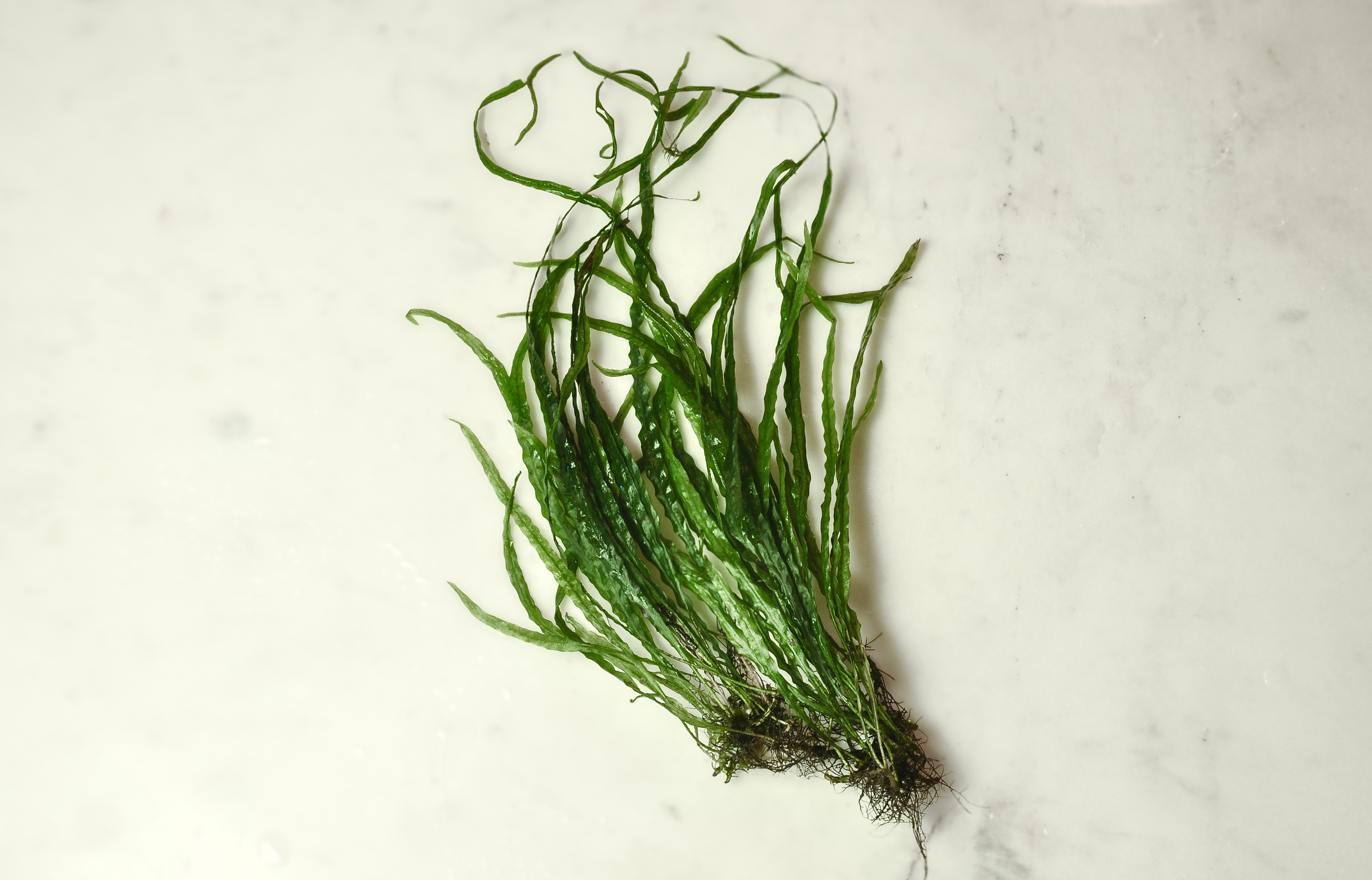
Java fern needle

Java fern is one of the most popular plants in the aquarium hobby, due to its aesthetic appeal and ease of care. Several cultivars of Java fern exist, including the "narrow leaf", "needle leaf", "Windelov", "trident", and "lance leaf" variants. Cultivation in the aquarium is usually performed by tying or glueing the roots coming from the rhizome to rock or driftwood, instead of planting it directly into the substrate.

It can be cultivated in tap water, dim or bright light, with or without gravel. It is more snail resistant and grows better with higher fish loads.

== Biology ==
Java ferns are epiphytes: they attach to surfaces rather than rooting in substrate.
