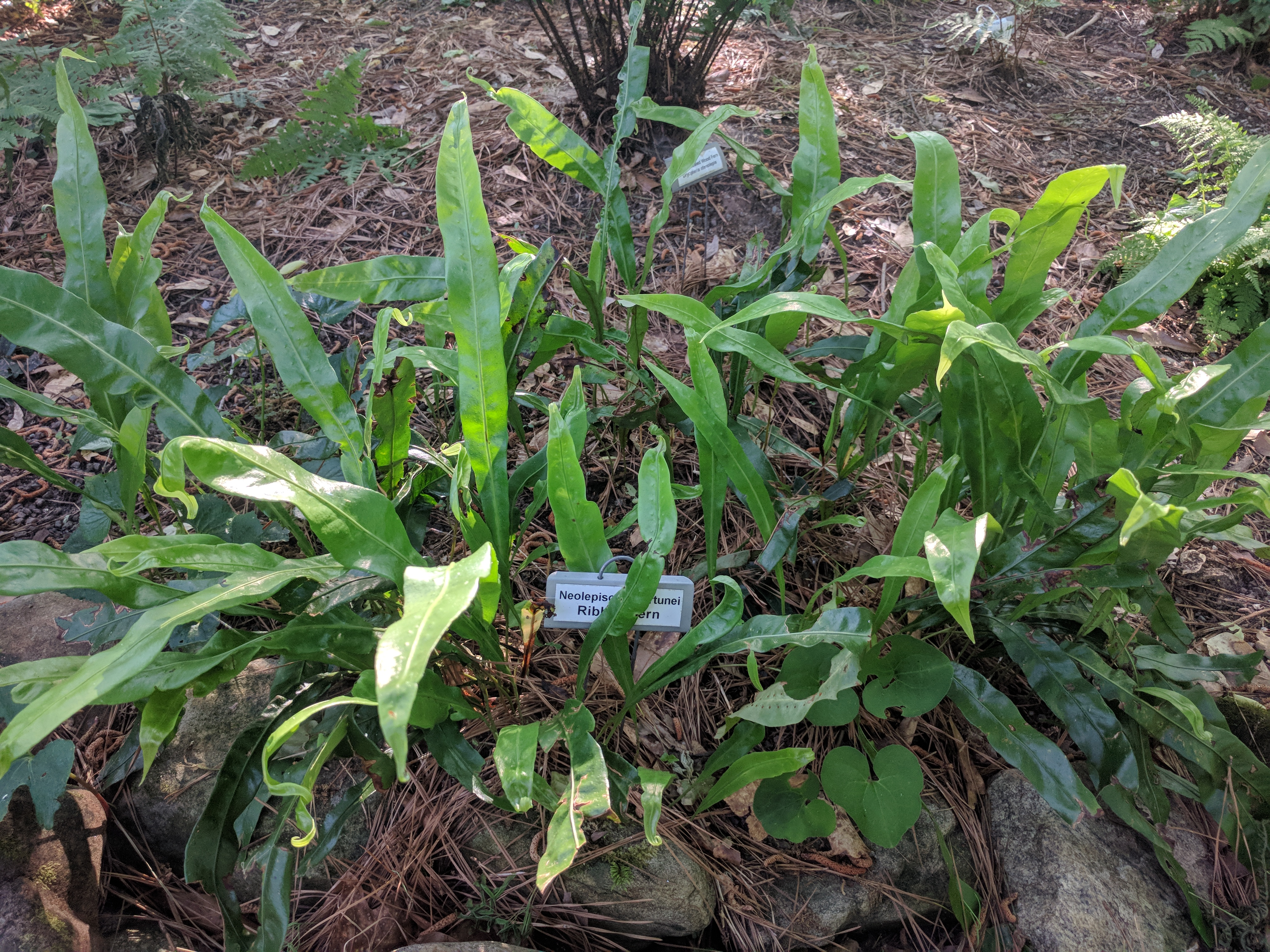
- In cultivation at Decatur, Georgia

Scientific classification
- Kingdom: Plantae
- Clade: Tracheophytes
- Division: Polypodiophyta
- Class: Polypodiopsida
- Order: Polypodiales
- Suborder: Polypodiineae
- Family: Polypodiaceae
- Genus: Neolepisorus
- Species: N. fortunei

Binomial name
- Neolepisorus fortunei (T.Moore) Li Wang

Synonyms
- Drynaria fortunei T.Moore; Lepisorus fortunei (T.Moore) C.M.Kuo; Lepisorus undulatus Ching & Z.Y.Liu; Microsorum chinense (Mett.ex Kuhn) Fraser-Jenk.; Microsorum excelsum Ching & S.K.Wu; Microsorum fortunei (Moore) Ching; Microsorum henryi (Christ) C.M.Kuo; Microsorum subnormale (Nakai) H.Itô; Microsorum takedae (Nakai) H.Itô; Neocheiropteris fortunei (T.Moore) Fraser-Jenk., Pariyar & Kandel; Neocheiropteris henryi (Christ) Fraser-Jenk.; Phymatodes takedae Nakai; Polypodium austrosinicum Christ; Polypodium bandoi C.Chr.; Polypodium chinense Mett.ex Kuhn; Polypodium fortunei (T.Moore) Lowe; Polypodium henryi Christ; Polypodium normale var. polysorum Drynaria fortunei; T.Moore Lepisorus fortunei; (T.Moore) C.M.Kuo Lepisorus undulatus; Ching & Z.Y.Liu Microsorum chinense; (Mett.ex Kuhn) Fraser-Jenk. Microsorum excelsum; Ching & S.K.Wu Microsorum fortunei; (Moore) Ching Microsorum henryi; (Christ) C.M.Kuo Microsorum subnormale; (Nakai) H.Itô Microsorum takedae; (Nakai) H.Itô Neocheiropteris fortunei; (T.Moore) Fraser-Jenk., Pariyar & Kandel Neocheiropteris henryi; (Christ) Fraser-Jenk. Phymatodes takedae; Nakai Polypodium austrosinicum; Christ Polypodium bandoi; C.Chr. Polypodium chinense; Mett.ex Kuhn Polypodium fortunei; (T.Moore) Lowe Polypodium henryi; Christ Polypodium normale; var. polysorum Baker; Polypodium sinense Christ; Polypodium takedae (Nakai) C.Chr. Baker; Polypodium sinense Christ; Polypodium takedae (Nakai) C.Chr.

= Neolepisorus fortunei =

Species of fern

Neolepisorus fortunei (Fortune's ribbon fern), is a species of fern native to southern China south to Malaysia, found by streams in forests.
