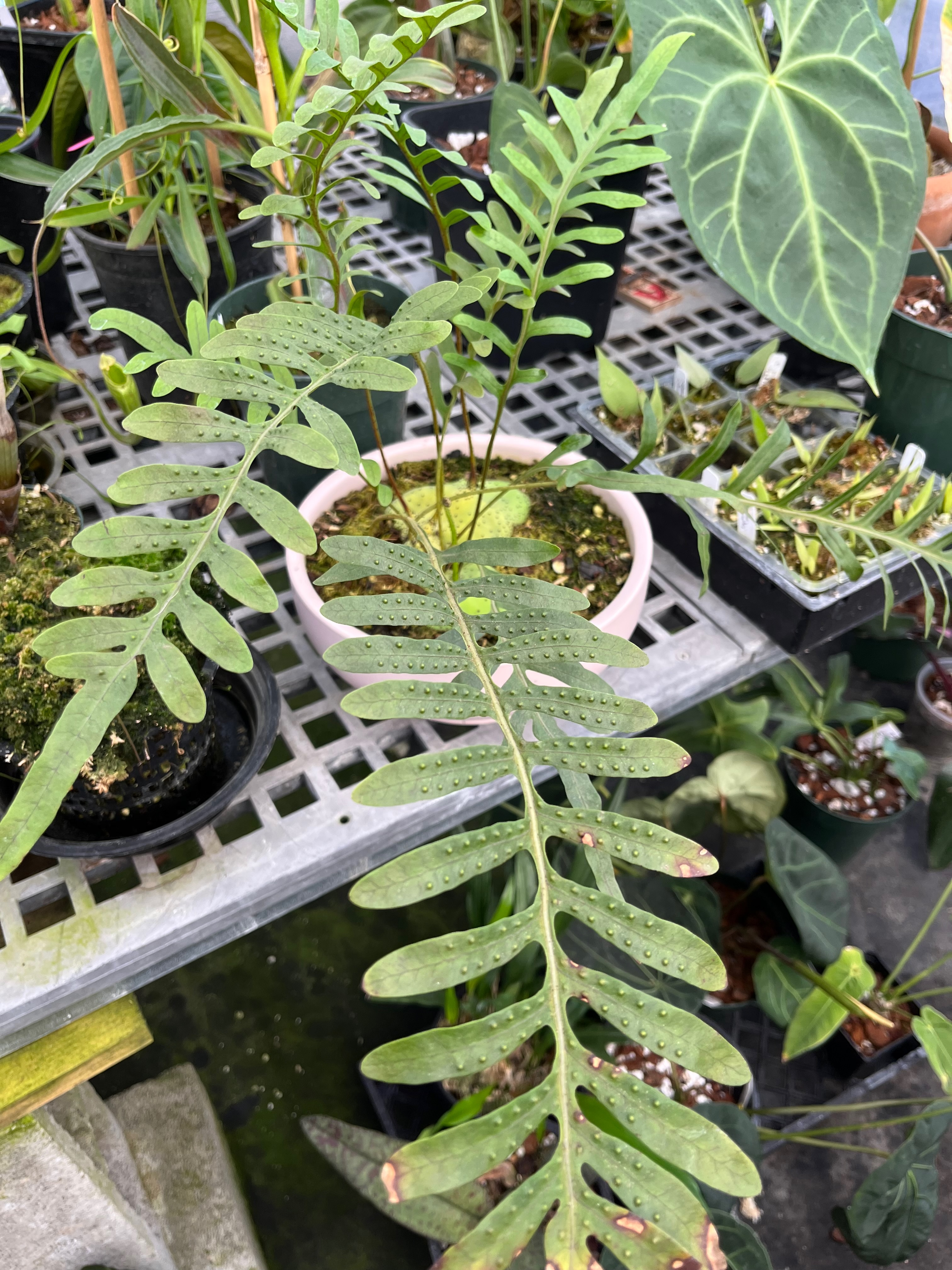

Scientific classification
- Kingdom: Plantae
- Clade: Tracheophytes
- Division: Polypodiophyta
- Class: Polypodiopsida
- Order: Polypodiales
- Suborder: Polypodiineae
- Family: Polypodiaceae
- Genus: Lecanopteris
- Species: L. mirabilis

Binomial name
- Lecanopteris mirabilis Copel.

= Lecanopteris mirabilis =

Species of plant

Lecanopteris mirabilis is a species of tropical fern in the genus Lecanopteris native to Papua New Guinea and Sulawesi. An epiphyte, its name means "wonderful" or "marvelous". Like others of its genus, it grows from a large rhizome that in this case can be up to 25 centimetres (9.8 in) in diameter. This rhizome forms a shelter for ants, making this a myrmecophyte, though unlike others of its genus the rhizome is flattened and doesn't contain hollow galleries. Individual fronds may be up to 85 centimetres (33 in) long.
