= Leptochilus pothifolius =

Scientific classification
- Kingdom: Plantae
- Clade: Tracheophytes
- Division: Polypodiophyta
- Class: Polypodiopsida
- Order: Polypodiales
- Suborder: Polypodiineae
- Family: Polypodiaceae
- Genus: Leptochilus
- Species: L. pothifolius

Binomial name
- Leptochilus pothifolius (D.Don) Fraser-Jenk.

Synonyms
- Colysis × kiusiana Sa.Kurata; Colysis decurrens (Wall. ex Hook. & Grev.) Nakaike; Colysis elegans Sa.Kurata; Colysis flavescens (Ching) Nakaike, S.Matsumoto & V.L.Gurung; Colysis flavescens (Ching) S.R.Ghosh; Colysis leptophylla H.Itô; Colysis pothifolia (D.Don) C.Presl; Grammitis decurrens Wall. ex Hook. & Grev.; Gymnogramma pothifolia Spreng.; Hemionitis pothifolia D.Don (basionym); Leptochilus × kiusiana (Sa.Kurata) Nakaike; Leptochilus elegans (Sa.Kurata) Nakaike; Leptochilus neopothifolia Nakaike; Polypodium flavescens Ching; Polypodium pothifolium Mett.; Selliguea elliptica Bedd.; Selliguea pothifolia J.Sm.

Species of fern

Leptochilus pothifolius is a species of fern in the family Polypodiaceae. It is found from the Himalayas through temperate East Asia to the Philippines. It has a large number of synonyms.
