= Neocheiropteris palmatopedata =

Conservation status
- Endangered (IUCN 3.1)

Scientific classification
- Kingdom: Plantae
- Clade: Tracheophytes
- Division: Polypodiophyta
- Class: Polypodiopsida
- Order: Polypodiales
- Suborder: Polypodiineae
- Family: Polypodiaceae
- Genus: Neocheiropteris
- Species: N. palmatopedata

Binomial name
- Neocheiropteris palmatopedata (Baker) Christ

Synonyms
- Cheiropteris henryi Christ; Cheiropteris palmatopedata Christ; Microsorum palmatopedatum (Baker) Noot. Polypodium palmatopedatum Baker

Species of fern

Neocheiropteris palmatopedata is a species of fern in the family Polypodiaceae. It is endemic to China. Its natural habitats are subtropical or tropical dry forests and subtropical or tropical moist lowland forests. It is threatened by habitat loss.
