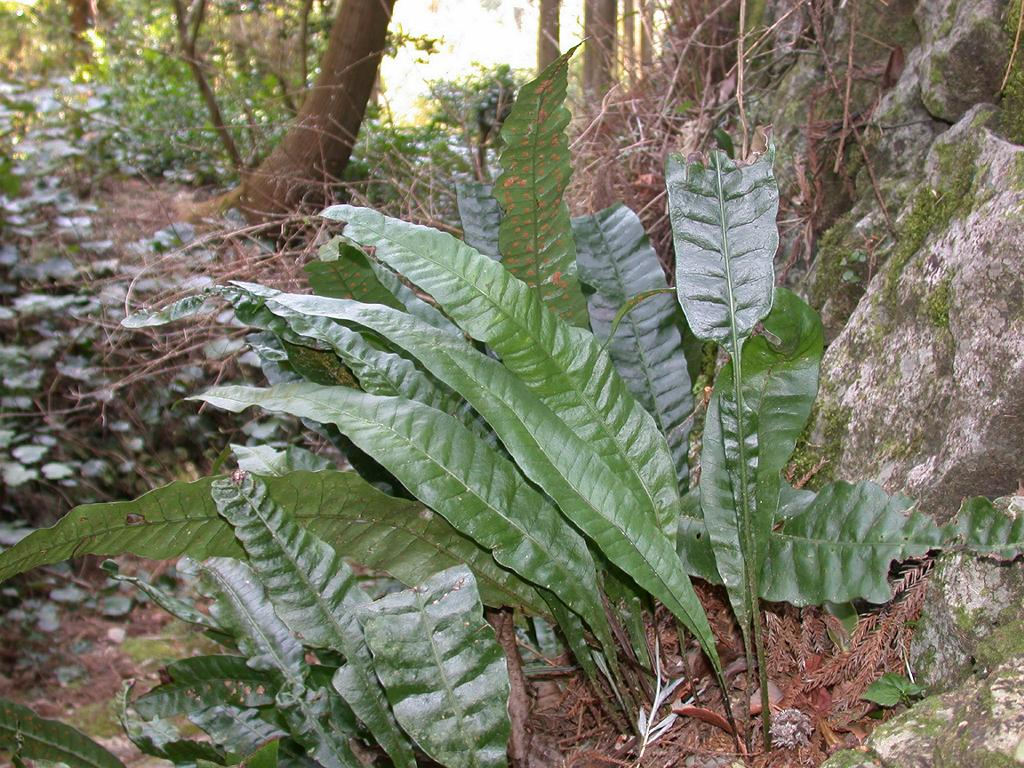
- Neocheiropteris ensata

Scientific classification
- Kingdom: Plantae
- Clade: Tracheophytes
- Division: Polypodiophyta
- Class: Polypodiopsida
- Order: Polypodiales
- Suborder: Polypodiineae
- Family: Polypodiaceae
- Subfamily: Microsoroideae
- Genus: Neocheiropteris; Christ

Species
- See text.

Synonyms
- Cheiropteris Christ, non Chiropteris J.G.Kurr ex H.G.Bronn

= Neocheiropteris =

Genus of ferns

Neocheiropteris is a genus of ferns in the family Polypodiaceae, subfamily Microsoroideae, according to the Pteridophyte Phylogeny Group classification of 2016 (PPG I).

== Taxonomy ==
A molecular phylogenetic study in 2019 suggested that Neocheiropteris was one of a group of closely related genera in the subfamily Microsoroideae, a group the authors termed "Lepisorus sensu lato". It species were embedded in a clade in which none of the genera appeared to be monophyletic:

- Lepisorus s.l.
  - - Lemmaphyllum
    - Lepidomicrosorium + Neocheiropteris + Neolepisorus + Tricholepidium
  - - Lepisorus s.s.
    - Paragramma (as Lepisorus longifolius)

=== Species ===
As of February 2020, the Checklist of Ferns and Lycophytes of the World recognized the following species, while noting that the distinction from Neolepisorus was not clear:

- Neocheiropteris ensata (Thunb.) Ching
- Neocheiropteris ovata (Wall. ex Hook. & Grev.) Fraser-Jenk.
- Neocheiropteris palmatopedata (Baker) Christ
- Neocheiropteris triglossa (Baker) Ching

Plants of the World Online submerges Neolepisorus into Neocheiropteris, although placing some species that the Checklist of Ferns and Lycophytes of the World accepts in Neolepisorus in Microsorum.
