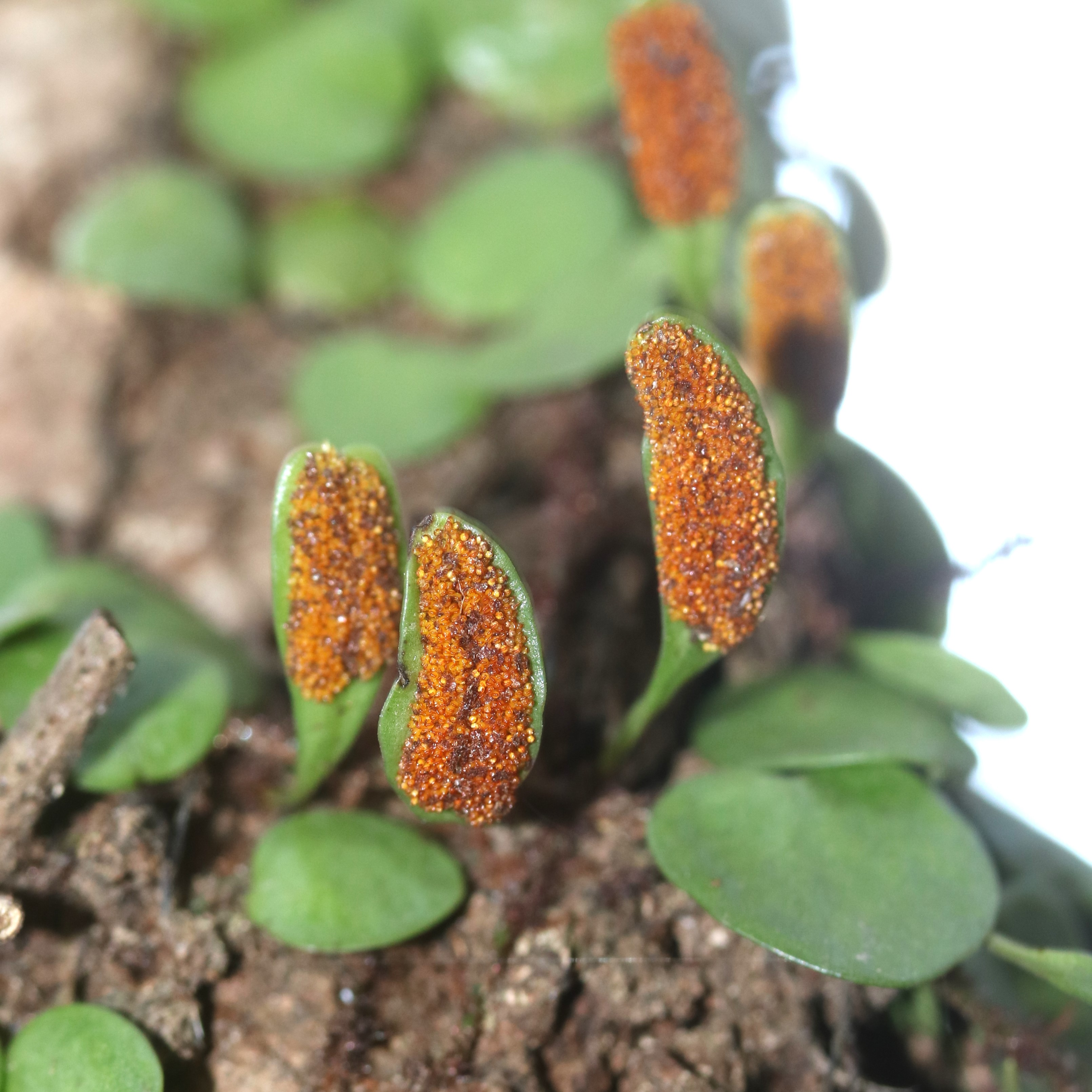
- Sporangium in Tahara, Aichi Prefecture, Japan

Scientific classification
- Kingdom: Plantae
- Clade: Tracheophytes
- Division: Polypodiophyta
- Class: Polypodiopsida
- Order: Polypodiales
- Suborder: Polypodiineae
- Family: Polypodiaceae
- Genus: Lepisorus
- Species: L. microphyllum

Binomial name
- Lepisorus microphyllum (C.Presl) C.F.Zhao, R.Wei & X.C.Zhang ex C.S.Chang, H.Kim & K.S.Chang

Synonyms
- List: Drymoglossum carnosum var. obovatum Harr.; Drymoglossum microphyllum (C. Presl) C. Chr.; Drymoglossum nobukoanum Makino; Drymoglossum obovatum (Harr.) Christ; Drymoglossum obovatum var. lutchuense Nakai; Drymoglossum spatulatum C. Presl; Lemmaphyllum carnosum subsp. microphyllum (C. Presl) Fraser-Jenk. & Kandel; Lemmaphyllum carnosum var. microphyllum (C. Presl) X. P. Wei; Lemmaphyllum microphyllum C. Presl; Lemmaphyllum microphyllum var. lutchuense (Nakai) C. Chr.; Lemmaphyllum microphyllum var. nobukoanum (Makino) Nakaike; Lemmaphyllum microphyllum var. obovatum (Harr.) C. Chr.; Lemmaphyllum microphyllum var. spathulatum (C. Presl) Nakaike; Lemmaphyllum minimum S. H. Fu; Lemmaphyllum nobukoanum (Makino) Ching; Lemmaphyllum spathulatum C. Presl; Lemmaphyllum squamosum C. Chr.; Taenitis microphylla (C. Presl) Mett.

= Lepisorus microphyllus =

Species of fern

Lepisorus microphyllum, the green penny fern, is a semi-succulent species of fern in the family Polypodiaceae. It is native to parts of China, Japan, and the eastern Asian seaboard.
