= Tricholepidium =

Scientific classification
- Kingdom: Plantae
- Clade: Tracheophytes
- Division: Polypodiophyta
- Class: Polypodiopsida
- Order: Polypodiales
- Suborder: Polypodiineae
- Family: Polypodiaceae
- Subfamily: Microsoroideae
- Genus: Tricholepidium; Ching

Species
- See text.

Genus of ferns

Tricholepidium is a genus of ferns in the family Polypodiaceae, subfamily Microsoroideae, according to the Pteridophyte Phylogeny Group classification of 2016 (PPG I).

== Taxonomy ==
Tricholepidium was first described by Ren-Chang Ching in 1978. A molecular phylogenetic study in 2019 suggested that Tricholepidium was one of a group of closely related genera in the subfamily Microsoroideae, a group the authors termed "Lepisorus sensu lato". Its species were embedded in a clade in which none of the genera appeared to be monophyletic:

- Lepisorus s.l.
  - - Lemmaphyllum
    - Lepidomicrosorium + Neocheiropteris + Neolepisorus + Tricholepidium
  - - Lepisorus s.s.
    - Paragramma (as Lepisorus longifolius)

=== Species ===
The Pteridophyte Phylogeny Group classification of 2016 (PPG I) separates the monotypic genus Lepidomicrosorium from Tricholepidium. As of February 2020, neither the Checklist of Ferns and Lycophytes of the World nor Plants of the World Online accepted the separation, and so placed Lepidomicrosorium subhastatum in Tricholepidium (as Tricholepidium buergerianum) along with four other species:

- Tricholepidium normale (Don) Ching
- Tricholepidium subhemionitideum (Christ) Fraser-Jenk.
- Tricholepidium superficiale (Blume) Fraser-Jenk.
- Tricholepidium venosum Ching
