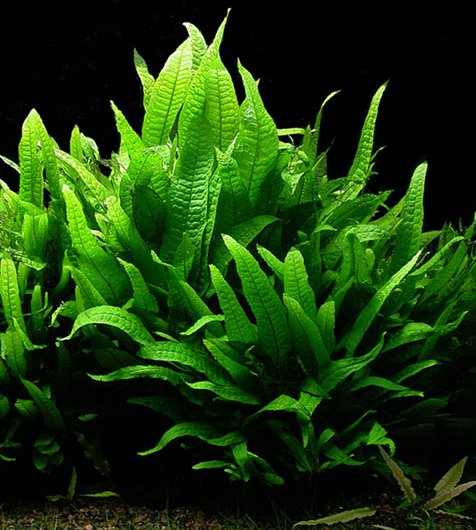
- Leptochilus pteropus subsp. pteropus

Scientific classification
- Kingdom: Plantae
- Clade: Tracheophytes
- Division: Polypodiophyta
- Class: Polypodiopsida
- Order: Polypodiales
- Suborder: Polypodiineae
- Family: Polypodiaceae
- Subfamily: Microsoroideae
- Genus: Leptochilus; Kaulf.

Species
- See text.

Synonyms
- Colysis C.Presl; Kontumia S.K.Wu & K.L.Phan

= Leptochilus (plant) =

Genus of ferns

Leptochilus is a fern genus in the family Polypodiaceae, subfamily Microsoroideae, according to the Pteridophyte Phylogeny Group classification of 2016 (PPG I).

== Taxonomy ==
A molecular phylogenetic study of the subfamily Microsoroideae in 2019 suggested that the genus was monophyletic, being sister to Microsorum, together forming one of the three main clades in the subfamily:

- Microsoroideae
  - - - Lepisorus s.l. (7 genera in the PPG I system)
      - - Microsorum
        - Leptochilus
    - lecanopteroid genera (4 genera)
  - Goniophlebium

=== Species ===
The Pteridophyte Phylogeny Group classification of 2016 (PPG I) suggests that the genus contains about 10 species. As of February 2020, the Checklist of Ferns and Lycophytes of the World noted that the species circumscription was "fairly controversial and fluctuating", and accepted 34 species and hybrids:

- Leptochilus axillaris (Cav.) Kaulf.
- Leptochilus bolsteri (Copel.) Parris
- Leptochilus cantoniensis (Baker) Ching
- Leptochilus chilangensis (V.N.Tu) Liang Zhang & Li Bing Zhang
- Leptochilus chingii Liang Zhang & Li Bing Zhang
- Leptochilus chittagongensis Fraser-Jenk. & Gias
- Leptochilus decurrens Blume
- Leptochilus digitatus (Baker) Noot.
- Leptochilus dissimilialatus (Bonap.) Liang Zhang & Li Bing Zhang
- Leptochilus dolichopterus (Copel.) Fraser-Jenk. & Amoroso
- Leptochilus ellipticus (Thunb.) Noot.
- Leptochilus evrardii (Tardieu) Liang Zhang & Li Bing Zhang
- Leptochilus flexilobus (Christ) Liang Zhang & Li Bing Zhang
- Leptochilus fluviatilis (Lauterb.) Liang Zhang & Li Bing Zhang
- Leptochilus hemionitideus (C.Presl) Noot.
- Leptochilus henryi (Baker) X.C.Zhang
- Leptochilus heterophyllus (S.K.Wu & P.K.Lôc) comb. ined.
- Leptochilus insignis (Blume) Fraser-Jenk.
- Leptochilus lanceolatus Fée
- Leptochilus leveillei (Ching) X.C.Zhang
- Leptochilus macrophyllus (Blume) Noot.
- Leptochilus mengsongensis M.X.Zhao
- Leptochilus minor Fée
- Leptochilus morsei (Ching) Fraser-Jenk.
- Leptochilus × nepalensis Fraser-Jenk.
- Leptochilus oblongus Li Bing Zhang, Liang Zhang & N.T.Lu
- Leptochilus pedunculatus (Hook. & Grev.) Fraser-Jenk.
- Leptochilus pentaphyllus (Baker) Liang Zhang & Li Bing Zhang
- Leptochilus poilanei (C.Chr. & Tardieu) Liang Zhang & Li Bing Zhang
- Leptochilus pothifolius (Buch.-Ham. ex D.Don) Fraser-Jenk.
- Leptochilus pteropus (Blume) Fraser-Jenk.
- Leptochilus saxicola (H.G.Zhou & Hua Li) Liang Zhang & Li Bing Zhang
- Leptochilus × shintenensis (Hayata) Nakaike
- Leptochilus wrightii (Hook.) X.C.Zhang
- Leptochilus yangjiangensis Zhou, H. J (2026)
