= Leptochilus cantoniensis =

Conservation status
- Vulnerable (IUCN 3.1)

Scientific classification
- Kingdom: Plantae
- Clade: Tracheophytes
- Division: Polypodiophyta
- Class: Polypodiopsida
- Order: Polypodiales
- Suborder: Polypodiineae
- Family: Polypodiaceae
- Genus: Leptochilus
- Species: L. cantoniensis

Binomial name
- Leptochilus cantoniensis (Baker) Ching

Synonyms
- Campium cantoniense Ching; Campium dilatatum Copel. Christiopteris cantoniensis Christ; Dendroglossa cantoniensis (Baker) Copel. Drymoglossum cordatum Christ; Leptochilus cordatus (Christ) Ching; Myuropteris cordata C.Chr. Polypodium cantoniense Baker

Species of plant

Leptochilus cantoniensis is a species of fern in the family Polypodiaceae. It is endemic to China. Its natural habitats are subtropical or tropical moist lowland forests and subtropical or tropical moist montane forests. It is threatened by habitat loss.
