= Lepidomicrosorium =

Scientific classification
- Kingdom: Plantae
- Clade: Tracheophytes
- Division: Polypodiophyta
- Class: Polypodiopsida
- Order: Polypodiales
- Suborder: Polypodiineae
- Family: Polypodiaceae
- Subfamily: Microsoroideae
- Genus: Lepidomicrosorium; Ching & K.H.Shing
- Species: L. subhastatum

Binomial name
- Lepidomicrosorium subhastatum (Baker) Ching

Synonyms
- Lepidomicrosorium asarifolium Ching & K.H.Shing; Lepidomicrosorium brevipes Ching & K.H.Shing; Lepidomicrosorium buergerianum (Miq.) Ching & K.H.Shing; Lepidomicrosorium emeicola Ching & K.H.Shing; Lepidomicrosorium hederaceum (Christ) Ching; Lepidomicrosorium lanceolatum Ching & P.S.Wang; Lepidomicrosorium latibasis Ching & K.H.Shing; Lepidomicrosorium microsorioides (W.M.Chu) Ching & W.M.Chu; Lepidomicrosorium subhastatum (Baker) Ching; Lepidomicrosorium subsessile Ching & K.H.Shing; Lepidomicrosorium suijiangense Ching & W.M.Chu; Lepidomicrosorium yiliangense Ching & K.H.Shing; Leptochilus buergerianus (Miq.) Bosman; Microsorum buergerianum (Miq.) Ching; Microsorum buergerianum var.ohwianum (Tagawa) Tagawa; Microsorum ohwianum Tagawa; Microsorum subhastatum (Baker) Ching; Neocheiropteris buergerianus (Miq.) Nakaike; Neocheiropteris subhastata (Baker) Tagawa; Neolepisorus microsorioides W.M.Zhu; Polypodium buergerianum Miq.; Polypodium hederaceum Christ; Polypodium subhastatum Baker

Genus of ferns

Lepidomicrosorium is a genus of ferns in the family Polypodiaceae, subfamily Microsoroideae, with a single species, Lepidomicrosorium subhastatum, according to the Pteridophyte Phylogeny Group classification of 2016 (PPG I). Other sources do not accept the genus, submerging it into Tricholepidium, with Lepidomicrosorium subhastatum becoming Tricholepidium buergerianum (Miq.) Fraser-Jenk.

== Phylogeny ==
A molecular phylogenetic study in 2019 suggested that Lepidomicrosorium was one of a group of closely related genera in the subfamily Microsoroideae, a group the authors termed "Lepisorus sensu lato". Its sole species was embedded in a clade in which none of the genera appeared to be monophyletic:

- Lepisorus s.l.
  - - Lemmaphyllum
    - Lepidomicrosorium + Neocheiropteris + Neolepisorus + Tricholepidium
  - - Lepisorus s.s.
    - Paragramma (as Lepisorus longifolius)
