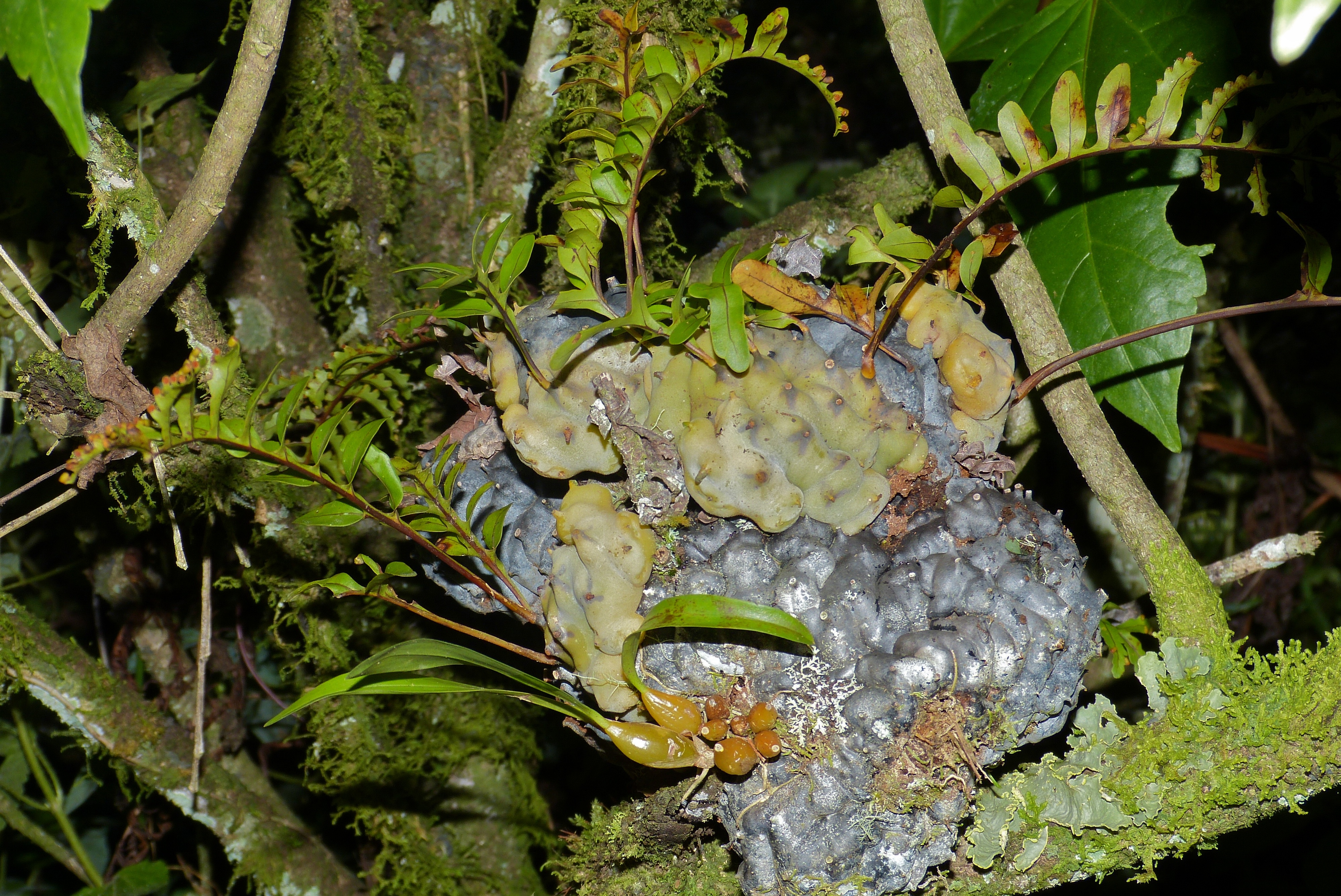
- L. carnosa growing in Cameron Highlands, Malaysia

Scientific classification
- Kingdom: Plantae
- Clade: Tracheophytes
- Division: Polypodiophyta
- Class: Polypodiopsida
- Order: Polypodiales
- Suborder: Polypodiineae
- Family: Polypodiaceae
- Genus: Lecanopteris
- Species: L. carnosa

Binomial name
- Lecanopteris carnosa (Reinw.) Blume

= Lecanopteris carnosa =

Species of plant

Lecanopteris carnosa is a species of tropical fern in the genus Lecanopteris (family Polypodaceae) native to Borneo, Malaysia, the Philippines, Sumatra, and Sulawesi. It is an epiphyte, with thick, fleshy rhizome that forms hollow spaces up to 15 cm (6 in) thick that provide shelter for ants, making this a myrmecophyte as well as a succulent similar to others in this genus.
