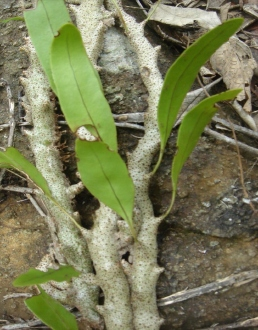

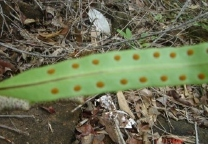

Scientific classification
- Kingdom: Plantae
- Clade: Tracheophytes
- Division: Polypodiophyta
- Class: Polypodiopsida
- Order: Polypodiales
- Suborder: Polypodiineae
- Family: Polypodiaceae
- Genus: Lecanopteris
- Species: L. sinuosa

Binomial name
- Lecanopteris sinuosa Wall. ex. Hook.

= Lecanopteris sinuosa =

Species of fern

Lecanopteris sinuosa is a fern that belongs to the fern genus Lecanopteris. This epiphytic plant has a mutualistic relationship with stingless shelter ants, which makes it a myrmecophyte.

The ant species associated with L. sinuosa belong within the genera Crematogaster, Technomyrmex or Iridomyrmex. The ants rear their larvae within the rhizome for protection, and in turn, L. sinuosa receives nutritional benefit from feces and other debris left behind by the ants. It is also suggested that L. sinuosa benefits from increased protection from herbivory and increased spore dispersal.

Lecanopteris sinuosa belongs in the subgenus Myrmecopteris (comprising four species total), which is characterized by ferns that have peltate scales and sori that are deeply immersed on the pinnae.

== Rhizome morphology ==
The unique rhizome structure of L. sinuosa allows it to maintain a mutualistic relationship with ants. As the plant is young, the rhizome is solid (without cavities), but as it matures, the thin walled parenchyma cells begin to hollow. These cells become infused with phlopaphene (a deep brown strengthening substance), which causes the rhizome to appear rock-like.

== Phylogeny ==
The monophyletic genus, Lecanopteris, is in the fern family, Polypodicaeae. It comprises two sub-genera: Lecanopteris and Myrmecopteris. The genus comprises 13 species total, all of which have rhizomes associated with ants. Subgenus Lecanopteris is monophyletic, and Myrmecopteris is paraphyletic and contains L. sinuosa. Within the sub-genus, L. sinuosa is sister to Lecanopteris crustacea, Lecanopteris sarcopus (syn. L. lomarioides), and sub-genus Lecanopteris. This phylogenic relationship was determined based on a tree using parsimony and maximum likelihood combined using genetic sequences from the rbcL gene and the trnL-F non-coding region.

== Distribution ==
Lecanopteris sinuosa has been identified in Malesia, Sulawesi (Celebes), Philippines, New Guinea, Moluccas, Indochina, and Vanuatu. It can survive in almost any habitat found in the listed locations except lowland rainforests.
