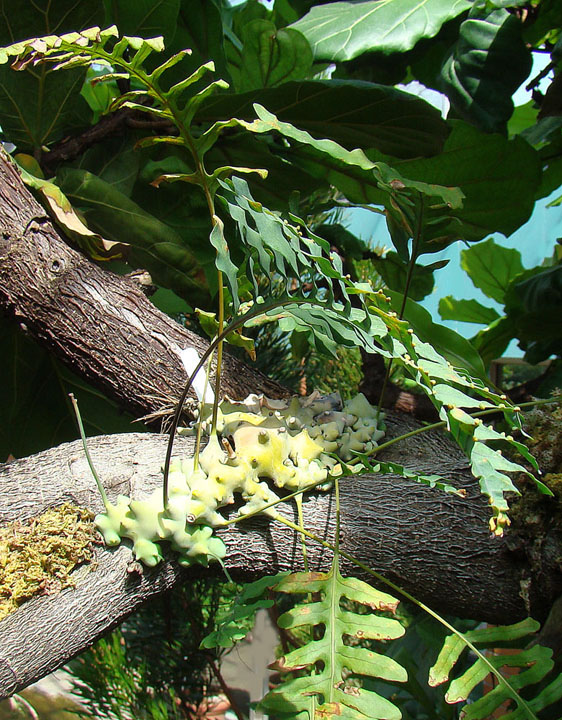

Scientific classification
- Kingdom: Plantae
- Clade: Tracheophytes
- Division: Polypodiophyta
- Class: Polypodiopsida
- Order: Polypodiales
- Suborder: Polypodiineae
- Family: Polypodiaceae
- Genus: Lecanopteris
- Species: L. deparioides

Binomial name
- Lecanopteris deparioides (Ces.) Baker

Synonyms
- Davallia deparioides Ces.; Lecanopteris curtisii Baker; Lecanopteris davallioides Alderw.; Lecanopteris incurvata Baker; Lecanopteris macleayi Baker; Lecanopteris philippinensis Alderw.; Lecanopteris pumila Copel.; Lecanopteris saccata Alderw.; Pleopeltis barisanica Alderw.; Pleopeltis curtisii (Baker) Alderw.; Pleopeltis deparioides (Ces.) Alderw.; Pleopeltis macleayi (Baker) Alderw.; Polypodium deparioides (Ces.) Christ; Polypodium macleayi (Baker) Alderw.; Polypodium naviculare Alderw.

= Lecanopteris deparioides =

Species of fern

Lecanopteris deparioides is a fern in the Polypodiaceae family. It is native to Malesia and New Guinea.
