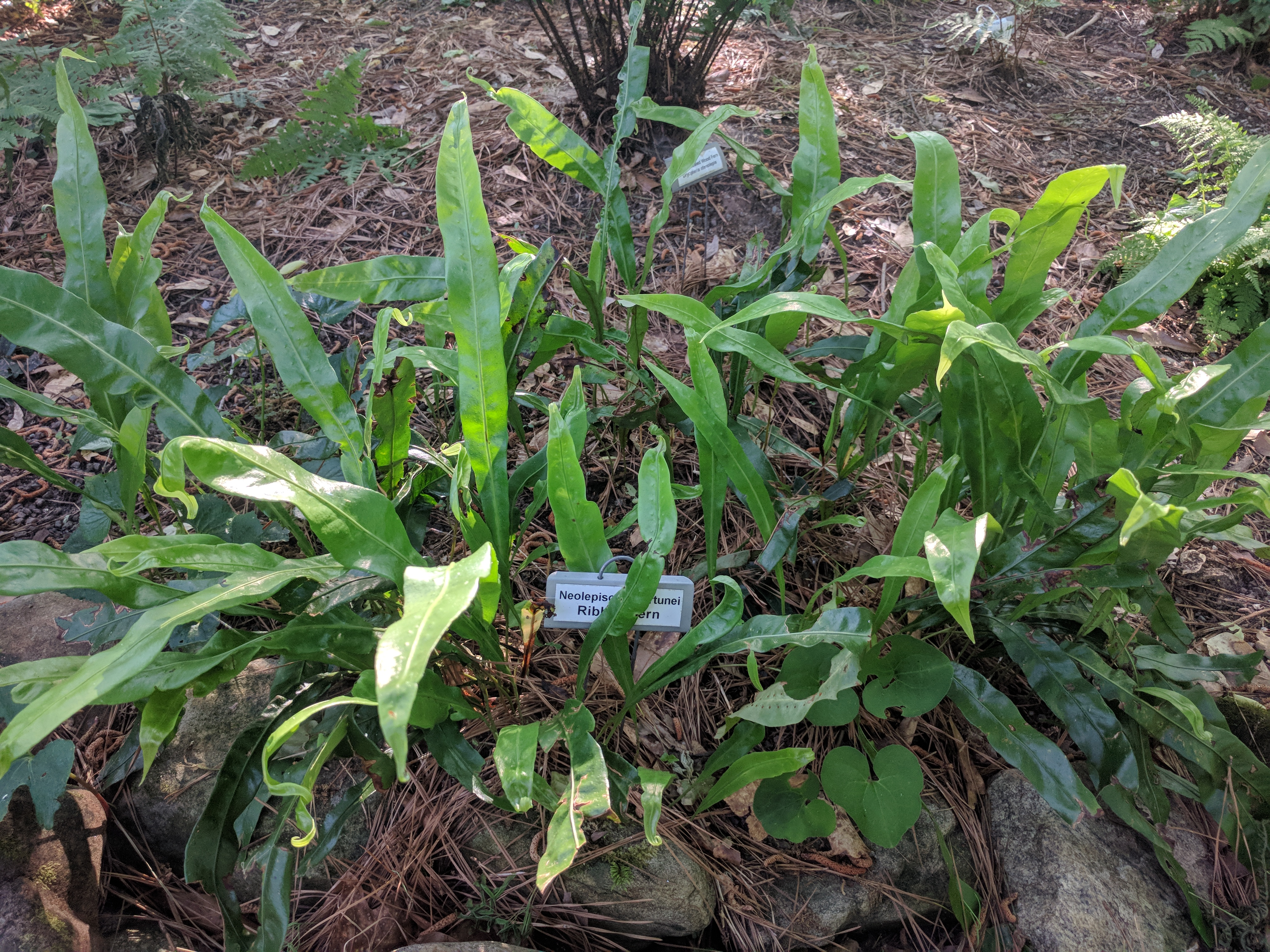
- Neolepisorus fortunei in cultivation

Scientific classification
- Kingdom: Plantae
- Clade: Tracheophytes
- Division: Polypodiophyta
- Class: Polypodiopsida
- Order: Polypodiales
- Suborder: Polypodiineae
- Family: Polypodiaceae
- Subfamily: Microsoroideae
- Genus: Neolepisorus; Ching

Species
- See text.

Synonyms

= Neolepisorus =

Genus of ferns

Neolepisorus is a genus of ferns in the family Polypodiaceae, subfamily Microsoroideae, according to the Pteridophyte Phylogeny Group classification of 2016 (PPG I).

== Taxonomy ==
Neolepisorus was first described by Ren-Chang Ching in 1940. A molecular phylogenetic study in 2019 suggested that Neolepisorus was one of a group of closely related genera in the subfamily Microsoroideae, a group the authors termed "Lepisorus sensu lato". It species were embedded in a clade in which none of the genera appeared to be monophyletic:

- Lepisorus s.l.
  - - Lemmaphyllum
    - Lepidomicrosorium + Neocheiropteris + Neolepisorus + Tricholepidium
  - - Lepisorus s.s.
    - Paragramma (as Lepisorus longifolius)

=== Species ===
As of February 2020, the Checklist of Ferns and Lycophytes of the World recognized the following species:

- Neolepisorus fortunei (T.Moore) Li Wang
- Neolepisorus pappei (Mett. ex Kuhn) Li Wang
- Neolepisorus zippelii (Blume) Li Wang

As of February 2020, Plants of the World Online did not accept the genus, sinking it into Neocheiropteris, although placing some of its species in Microsorum.
