= Bosmania =

Scientific classification
- Kingdom: Plantae
- Clade: Tracheophytes
- Division: Polypodiophyta
- Class: Polypodiopsida
- Order: Polypodiales
- Suborder: Polypodiineae
- Family: Polypodiaceae
- Subfamily: Microsoroideae
- Genus: Bosmania; Testo

Species
- See text.

Synonyms

Genus of ferns

Bosmania is a genus of ferns in the family Polypodiaceae, subfamily Microsoroideae, erected in 2019. As of February 2020, the genus was not accepted by some sources.

== Description ==
Bosmania species are terrestrial plants, lithophytes or epiphytes. They grow from creeping rhizomes that are circular in cross-section, or slightly flattened from top to bottom, with roots emerging from the underside. The rhizome has brown scales, 1.5–9 mm long, 1–3 mm wide. Their leaves are elliptical in shape, undivided, up to 110 cm long and 15 cm wide, and have a wingless petiole 1–15 cm long. A characteristic of the genus is that the leaves are "seasonally deciduous", i.e. shed during unfavourable conditions. The blade of the leaf (lamina) is thin with prominent veins. The sori are round to slightly elliptical with bright yellow monolete spores.

== Taxonomy ==
The division of the subfamily Microsoroideae into genera has long been uncertain. A 2019 molecular phylogenetic study suggested that there were three clades, comprising species previously mainly placed in Microsorum, that were close to Lecanopteris sensu stricto and distinct from other clades in the subfamily. The authors of the study preferred to set up three extra monophyletic genera, rather than use a broader circumscription of Lecanopteris. The genera are related as shown in the following cladogram.

- Lecanopteris s.l.
  - Bosmania
  - - Dendroconche
    - - Zealandia
      - Lecanopteris s.s.

As of February 2020, the Checklist of Ferns and Lycophytes of the World recognized the segregate genera, including Bosmania; other sources did not.

The genus name Bosmania honours Dutch botanist Monique Bosman, who first identified and described this group of species in her 1991 monograph on Microsorum.

=== Species ===
As of February 2020, the Checklist of Ferns and Lycophytes of the World recognized the following species; all have previously been placed in the genus Microsorum:

- Bosmania lastii (Baker) Testo (syn. Microsorum lastii (Baker) Tardieu)
- Bosmania leandriana (Tardieu) Testo (syn. Microsorum leandrianum Tardieu)
- Bosmania membranacea (D.Don) Testo (syn. Microsorum membranaceum (D.Don) Ching)

== Distribution and habitat ==
Bosmania membranacea is widespread in tropical Asia, from the Indian subcontinent and China through Indochina to Taiwan and the Philippines. The other two species are rare, found only in Madagascar. They are usually found on limestone or soil derived from limestone.
