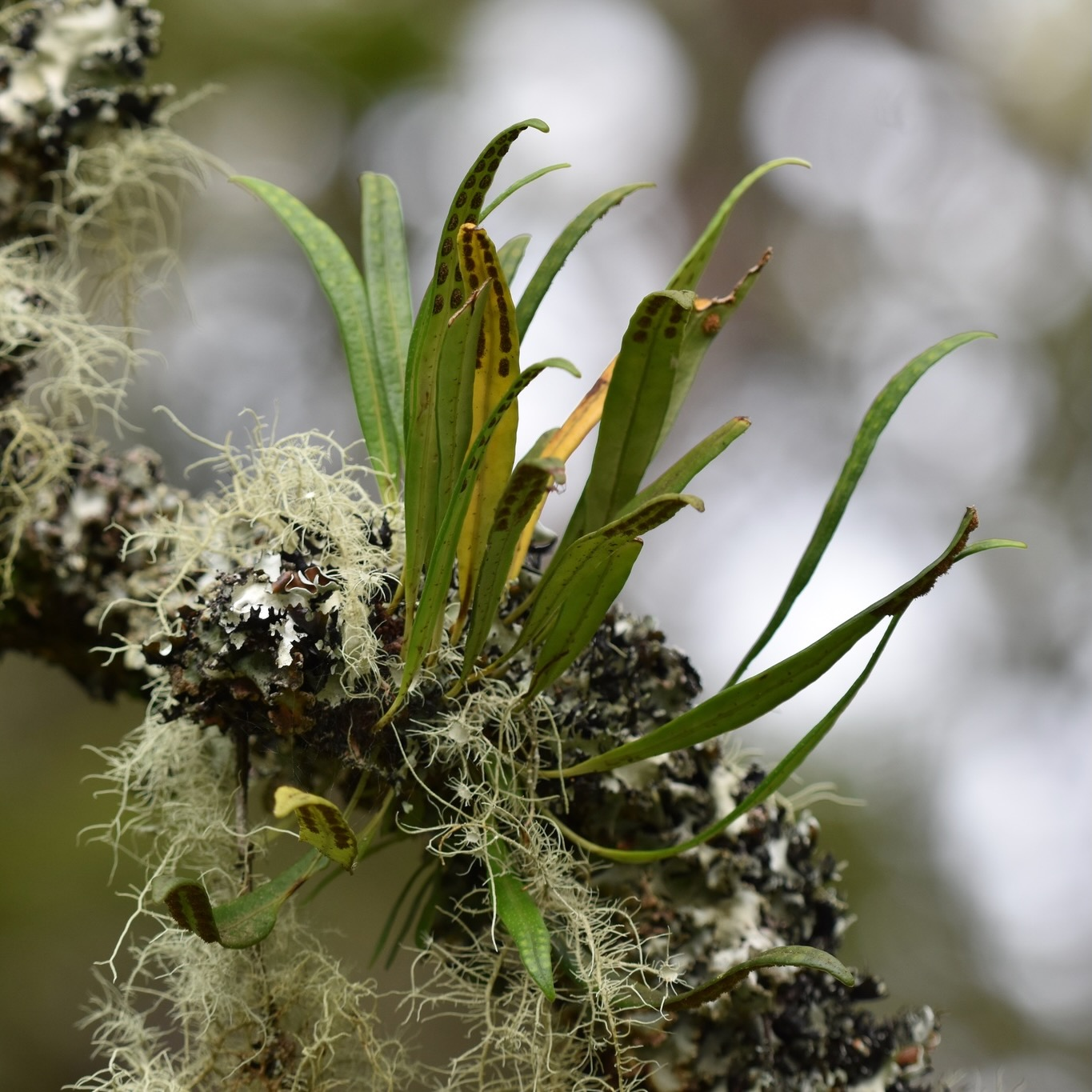
- Lepisorus thunbergianus in Hakalau Forest National Wildlife Refuge, Hawaii, Hawaii

Scientific classification
- Kingdom: Plantae
- Clade: Tracheophytes
- Division: Polypodiophyta
- Class: Polypodiopsida
- Order: Polypodiales
- Suborder: Polypodiineae
- Family: Polypodiaceae
- Genus: Lepisorus
- Species: L. thunbergianus

Binomial name
- Lepisorus thunbergianus (Kaulf.) Ching

= Lepisorus thunbergianus =

Species of plant

Lepisorus thunbergianus, the weeping fern, is an epiphyte with slender, undivided fronds. Across its native Asian and Pacific range, it has many common names, including 瓦韦 (wa wei) in Chinese, ノキシノブ (nokisinobu), "hiding under eaves" in Japanese, 일엽초 (il-yeobcho) in Korean, and ‘ēkaha ‘ākōlea, pua‘a kuhinia, or pākahakaha in Hawaiian. While it is currently accepted as a species, it is paraphyletic species complex, and "might need to be redefined."

== Description ==
Lepisorus thunbergianus is an ephiphyte that appears as clusters of 8–20 cm high fronds pointed skyward and spaced 0.5–2 cm apart, attached by creeping rhizomes to mossy trees, rocks, or similar substrate. The rhizomes have a diameter of 1.5–2.5 mm and are covered in dense brown lanceolate scales when young; older plants lack these scales. The frond shape is simple, not divided, in contrast to fiddlehead-forming fern species such as bracken. Each frond is nearly linear, but is slightly lanceolate; the widest part is 1/3 of the way from the base. Frond color ranges from yellowish- or brownish-green to green, with a straw-colored stipe. The mid-rib vein is easy to see running through the center of the frond, but the other veins are not obvious under the leathery leaf surface. Round to oval dark brown sori 1.5–3 mm in diameter occur on the top half of the frond.

== Range ==
Lepisorus thunbergianus is found on the Eurasian mainland in China, Korea, Laos, Myanmar, Nepal, Pakistan, Vietnam, as well as Bhutan and northeastern India. It is also found in several island localities in Asia and the Pacific: Japan, Kuril Islands, Ryukyu Islands, Philippines, Taiwan, and Hawaii.

== Habitat and ecology ==
It grows as an epiphyte, primarily on trees, sometimes on rocks or on human structures, such as rock walls, shrines, or under thatched roof eaves. It occurs mainly in the temperate parts of its range and is found from sea level to 2000 m elevation. L. thunbergianus is host to the leaf-miner fly Chromatomyia masumiae, the larvae of which live within the fronds, creating tunnels by eating the leaf from the inside.

== Uses by humans ==
L. thunbergianus has been used in Korean folk medicine. It has also been proposed as a naturally occurring long-term monitor of airborne mercury pollution, with past mercury levels being accurately recorded in its leaves.

== Taxonomy ==
The genus Lepisorus has been called "notorious for its taxonomic difficulty," with L. thunbergianus named "one of the most taxonomically problematic species."

L. thunbergianus falls in Lepisorus sect. Pseudovittaria. Ferns in this section can be distinguished from those in other Lepisorus sections by their rhizome scales that are bicolored and opaque in the middle. The section consists of L. angustus, L. suboligolepidus, L. heterolepis, L. eilophyllus, L. lewissi, L. obscure-venolusus, L. oligolepidus, L. tosaensis, L. tibeticus, L. confluens, L. sordidus, L. medogensis, L. sinensis, L. contortus, L. elegans, and L. lineariformis. L. thunbergianus hybridizes with several members of this section, with reticulate evolution through hybridization and polyploidy leading to the formation of new species that have been difficult to identify and resolve. This difficulty may be exacerbated by "considerable taxonomic confusion in China because of previous oversplitting."

=== Species complex ===
The following species have been proposed to occur in Japan:

- L. thunbergianus (2N = 50)
- L. nigripes (4N = 100, 101, 102), an allotetraploid from L. thunbergianus (2N) x Japanese L. angustus (2N) (accepted by POWO)
- L. kuratae (4N = 100), an allotetraploid from L. thunbergianus (2N) x L. tosaensis (2N)
- L. mikawanus (6N = 152), an allohexaploid from L. nigripes (4N) x (uncertainly) L. tosaensis (2N)
- L. tajimaensis (6N = 152), an allohexaploid from L. nigripes (4N) x L. oligolepidus (2N)

Additionally, the accepted species L. angustus has been called an ally of L. thunbergianus, although its sole visible distinguishing characteristic is in having linear rather than linear-lanceolate fronds. This was found to be phenotypic plasticity, with L. angustus growing identical leaves to L. thunbergianus in a greenhouse. Genetic data showed that Chinese and Japanese L. angustus are paraphyletic, with Chinese L. angustus more closely related to the Japanese L. thunbergianus clade than to Japanese L. angustus. Future work determining the status of L. angustus has been suggested.

Given that Chinese L. thunbergianus and Japanese L. thunbergianus do not form a monophyletic clade, and that cryptic species have been identified from L. thunbergerianus in Japan, it is likely that other species formed by allopatric and sympatric speciation will continue to be carved out from the extremely broad range L. thunbergerianus currently occupies, from Pakistan to Hawaii.

=== Species name ===
Because this species is widespread, multiple species names have been erected by different botanists (36 synonyms listed by POWO), starting with Polypodium lineare in 1784 by Carl Peter Thunberg from Japanese specimens; this name was changed to P. thunbergianus, as the name P. lineare already referred to a fern now called Dicranopteris linearis. In 1824, Georg Friedrich Kaulfuss gave the name Pleopeltis elongata to ferns from Oʻahu, Hawaii by Adelbert von Chamisso, who collected them while traveling on the Russian ship Rurik on a voyage that failed to discover the Northwest Passage. Unfortunately, the Hawaiian type specimen was destroyed when the Leipzig University was bombed in World War II; a lectotype has not yet been designated.

In 1933, Ren-Chang Ching erected the genus Lepisorus, moving both P. thunbergianus and P. elongata to it, also designating a lectotype for L. thunbergianus in Thunberg's herbarium collection. Although Ching maintained the two species as separate, only the name L. thunbergianus has been widely used for both. However, if the principle of priority were applied, this species should be called L. elongatus; to avoid this, a proposal called for the preservation of the name L. thunbergianus in 2024.
