= Zealandia (plant) =

Scientific classification
- Kingdom: Plantae
- Clade: Tracheophytes
- Division: Polypodiophyta
- Class: Polypodiopsida
- Order: Polypodiales
- Suborder: Polypodiineae
- Family: Polypodiaceae
- Subfamily: Microsoroideae
- Genus: Zealandia; Testo

Species
- See text.

Synonyms

Genus of ferns

Zealandia is a genus of ferns in the family Polypodiaceae, subfamily Microsoroideae, erected in 2019. As of February 2020, the genus was not accepted by some sources.

== Taxonomy ==
The division of the subfamily Microsoroideae into genera has long been uncertain. A 2019 molecular phylogenetic study suggested that there were three clades close to Lecanopteris sensu stricto and distinct from other clades in the subfamily. The authors of the study preferred to set up three extra monophyletic genera, rather than use a broader circumscription of Lecanopteris. The genera are related as shown in the following cladogram.

- Lecanopteris s.l.
  - Bosmania
  - - Dendroconche
    - - Zealandia
      - Lecanopteris s.s.

As of February 2020, the Checklist of Ferns and Lycophytes of the World recognized the segregate genera, including Zealandia; other sources did not.

=== Species ===
As of February 2020, the Checklist of Ferns and Lycophytes of the World recognized the following species:

- Zealandia novae-zealandiae (Baker) Testo & A.R.Field – North Island of New Zealand
- Zealandia powellii (Baker) Testo & A.R.Field – Maluku through New Guinea, Bismarck Archipelago, Solomon Islands, Vanuatu, Fiji, Samoa, Pitcairn Islands, Cook Islands, and Society Islands
- Zealandia pustulata (G.Forst.) Testo & A.R.Field – eastern Australia, Tasmania, Lord Howe and Norfolk islands, New Zealand
- Zealandia vieillardii (Mett.) Testo & A.R.Field – New Caledonia
