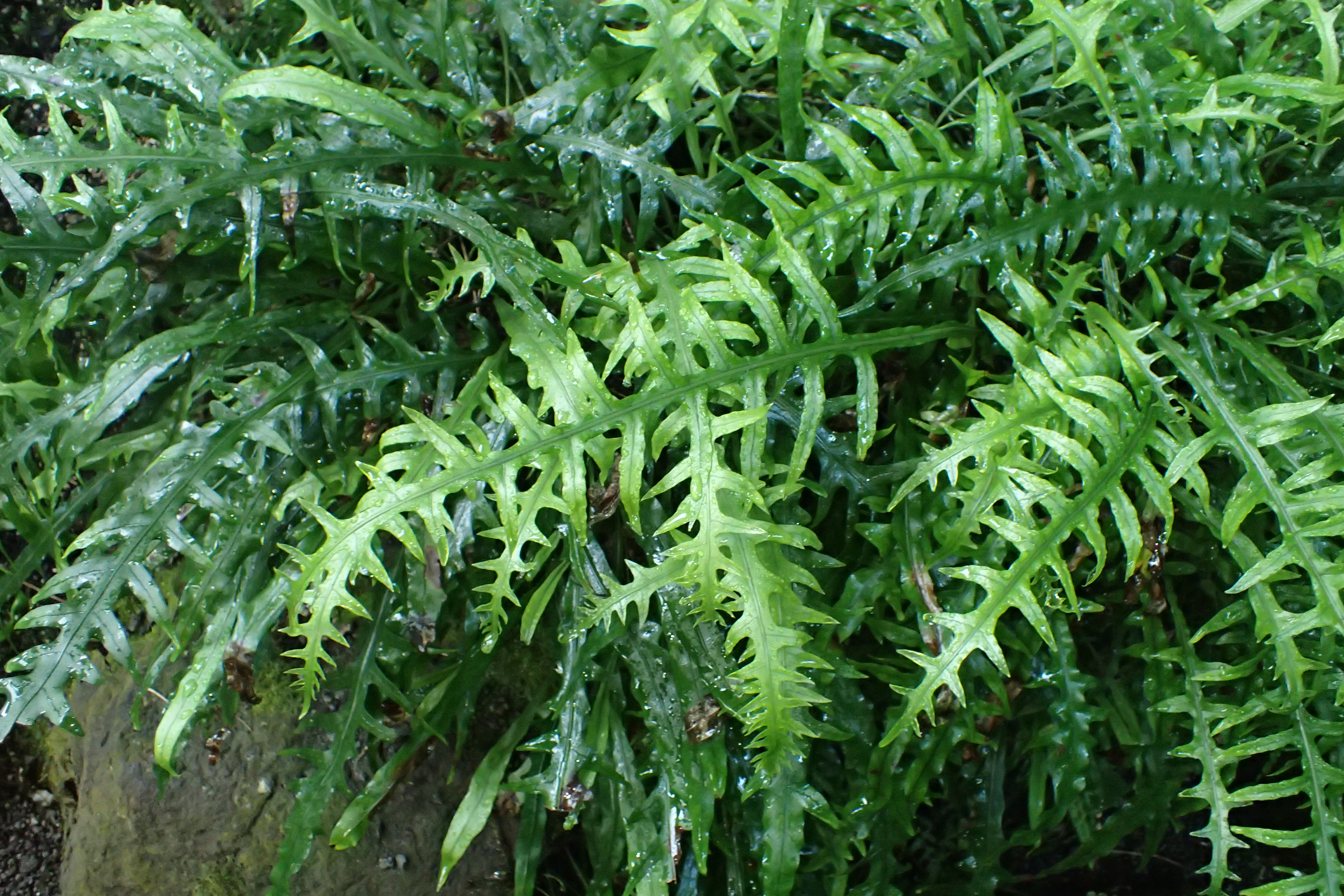
- Dendroconche scandens in Christchurch Botanic Gardens

Scientific classification
- Kingdom: Plantae
- Clade: Tracheophytes
- Division: Polypodiophyta
- Class: Polypodiopsida
- Order: Polypodiales
- Suborder: Polypodiineae
- Family: Polypodiaceae
- Subfamily: Microsoroideae
- Genus: Dendroconche; Copel.

Species
- See text.

= Dendroconche =

Genus of ferns

Dendroconche is a genus of ferns in the family Polypodiaceae, subfamily Microsoroideae, erected in 2019. As of February 2020, the genus was not accepted by some sources.

== Description ==
Species of Dendroconche are usually partially epiphytic. They grow from long, creeping rhizomes that are flattened from top to bottom and bear brown scales. In some species, the rhizome may have cavities. The rhizome produces two kinds of roots: those from the sides grip the surface on which the plant grows; those from underneath enter the substrate. The leaves vary in shape from undivided to deeply divided, and are up to 70 cm long by 40 cm wide. Some species produce leaves of somewhat different shapes. The leaves may or may not have a petiole, which if present is usually winged. The leaf veins are prominent. The sori are round or elongated.

== Taxonomy ==
The division of the subfamily Microsoroideae into genera has long been uncertain. A 2019 molecular phylogenetic study suggested that there were three clades, comprising species previously mainly placed in Microsorum, that were close to Lecanopteris sensu stricto and distinct from other clades in the subfamily. The authors of the study preferred to set up three extra monophyletic genera, rather than use a broader circumscription of Lecanopteris. The genera are related as shown in the following cladogram.

- Lecanopteris s.l.
  - Bosmania
  - - Dendroconche
    - - Zealandia
      - Lecanopteris s.s.

As of February 2020, the Checklist of Ferns and Lycophytes of the World recognized the segregate genera, including Dendroconche. Other sources did not; Plants of the World Online regarded Dendroconche as a synonym of Microsorum.

The genus name Dendroconche is Greek-derived, from dendron, meaning 'tree', and konchē, meaning 'shell', apparently referring to the rounded leaves and growth habit of Dendroconche annabellae, the type species.

=== Species ===
As of February 2020, the Checklist of Ferns and Lycophytes of the World recognized the following species:

- Dendroconche ampla (F.Muell. ex Benth.) Testo, Sundue & A.R.Field
- Dendroconche annabellae (Forbes) Copel.
- Dendroconche kingii Copel.
- Dendroconche latilobata (Hennipman & Hett.) Testo, Sundue & A.R.Field
- Dendroconche linguiforme (Mett.) Testo, Sundue & A.R.Field
- Dendroconche sayeri (F.Muell. & Baker) Testo, Sundue & A.R.Field
- Dendroconche scandens (G.Forst.) Testo, Sundue & A.R.Field
- Dendroconche varians (Mett.) Testo, Sundue & A.R.Field

== Distribution and habitat ==
Dendroconche species are native to eastern Australia, parts of Indonesia, New Guinea, New Caledonia, the Solomon Islands and New Zealand. D. linguiforme is widespread, and appears to have escaped from cultivation in India. The other species have narrow distributions. Species are found in rain forests at low to middle elevations.
