= Lepisorus ussuriensis =

Scientific classification
- Kingdom: Plantae
- Clade: Tracheophytes
- Division: Polypodiophyta
- Class: Polypodiopsida
- Order: Polypodiales
- Suborder: Polypodiineae
- Family: Polypodiaceae
- Genus: Lepisorus
- Species: L. ussuriensis

Binomial name
- Lepisorus ussuriensis (Regel & Maack) Ching

Synonyms
- Pleopeltis ussuriensis Regel & Maack

Species of flowering plant

Lepisorus ussuriensis is a species of fern belonging to the family Polypodiaceae.

It is native to the southern Russian Far East to China and Korea.
