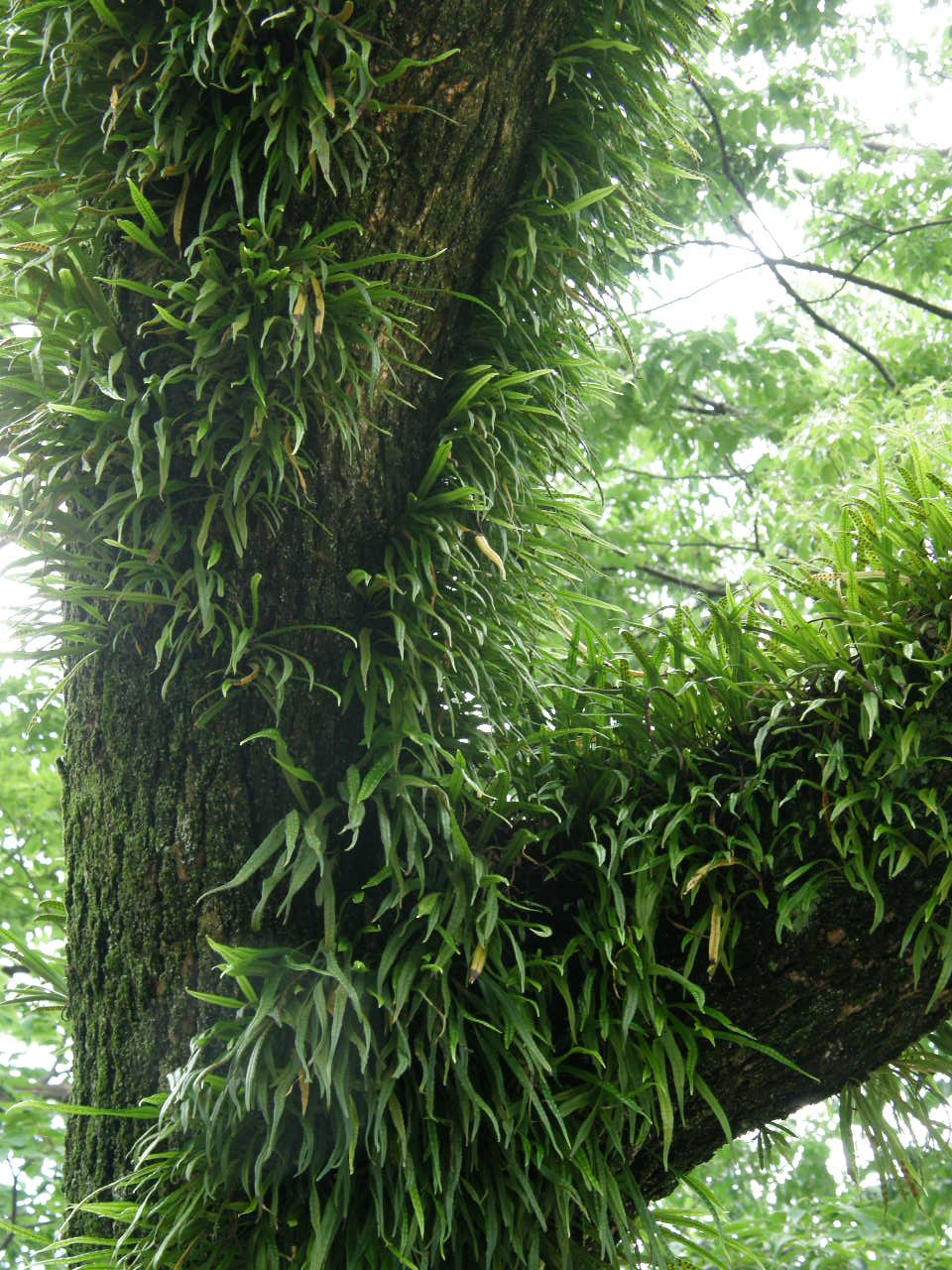
- Lepisorus thunbergianus in Japan

Scientific classification
- Kingdom: Plantae
- Clade: Tracheophytes
- Division: Polypodiophyta
- Class: Polypodiopsida
- Order: Polypodiales
- Suborder: Polypodiineae
- Family: Polypodiaceae
- Subfamily: Microsoroideae; B.K.Nayar

Genera
- See text.

= Microsoroideae =

Subfamily of ferns

Microsoroideae is a subfamily in the fern family Polypodiaceae in the Pteridophyte Phylogeny Group classification of 2016 (PPG I). The subfamily is also treated as the tribe Microsoreae within a very broadly defined family Polypodiaceae sensu lato. In either treatment, it includes the previously separated tribe Lepisoreae.

== Taxonomy ==
The taxonomy of the subfamily Microsoroideae has been described as "highly problematic". The division into genera varies considerably. The Pteridophyte Phylogeny Group classification of 2016 (PPG I) recognized the following genera, while accepting that some needed further evaluation:

- Goniophlebium (Blume) C.Presl
- Lecanopteris Reinw. ex Blume
- Lemmaphyllum C.Presl
- Lepidomicrosorium Ching & K.H.Shing
- Lepisorus (J.Sm.) Ching
- Leptochilus Kaulf. (including Kontumia)
- Microsorum Link (including Dendroconche, Kaulinia)
- Neocheiropteris Christ.
- Neolepisorus Ching
- Paragramma (Blume) T.Moore
- Thylacopteris Kunze ex J.Sm.
- Tricholepidium Ching

A molecular phylogenetic study in 2019 suggested the following relationship between the PPG I genera (Thylacopteris was not included in the study):

- Microsoroideae
  - - - - - Lemmaphyllum
          - Lepidomicrosorium + Neocheiropteris + Neolepisorus + Tricholepidium
        - - Lepisorus s.s.
          - Paragramma (as Lepisorus longifolius)
      - - Microsorum
        - Leptochilus
    - - Bosmania
      - - Dendroconche
        - - Zealandia
          - Lecanopteris
  - Goniophlebium

Species placed in the PPG I genera Lepidomicrosorium, Neocheiropteris, Neolepisorus and Tricholepidium were intermingled in a single clade. Although Lemmaphyllum and Lepisorus s.s. were monophyletic, the authors suggested a single broadly circumscribed Lepisorus s.l. for all of these genera. Three clades, mainly comprising species previously placed in Microsorum, were closely related to Lecanopteris s.s. and distinct from other clades in the subfamily. Rather than expanding the circumscription of Lecanopteris, the authors of the study preferred to use four genera, reviving Dendroconche and erecting two new genera Bosmania and Zealandia.

As of February 2020, Lepisorus s.l. and Lecanopteris s.l. are treated differently by PPG I, the Checklist of Ferns and Lycophytes of the World (CFLW) and Plants of the World Online (PoWO), as shown in the following tables.

Alternative treatments of Lepisorus s.l.
PPG I	CFLW	PoWO
Lemmaphyllum	Lemmaphyllum	Lemmaphyllum
Neocheiropteris	Neocheiropteris	Neocheiropteris
Neolepisorus	Neolepisorus	Neocheiropteris
Tricholepidium	Tricholepidium	Tricholepidium
Lepidomicrosorium	Tricholepidium	Tricholepidium
Lepisorus	Lepisorus	Lepisorus
Paragramma	Paragramma	Lepisorus

Alternative treatments of Lecanopteris s.l.
PPG I	CFLW	PoWO
syn. of Microsorum	Dendroconche	syn. of Microsorum
Not recognized	Bosmania	Not recognized
Not recognized	Zealandia	Not recognized
Lecanopteris	Lecanopteris	Lecanopteris
