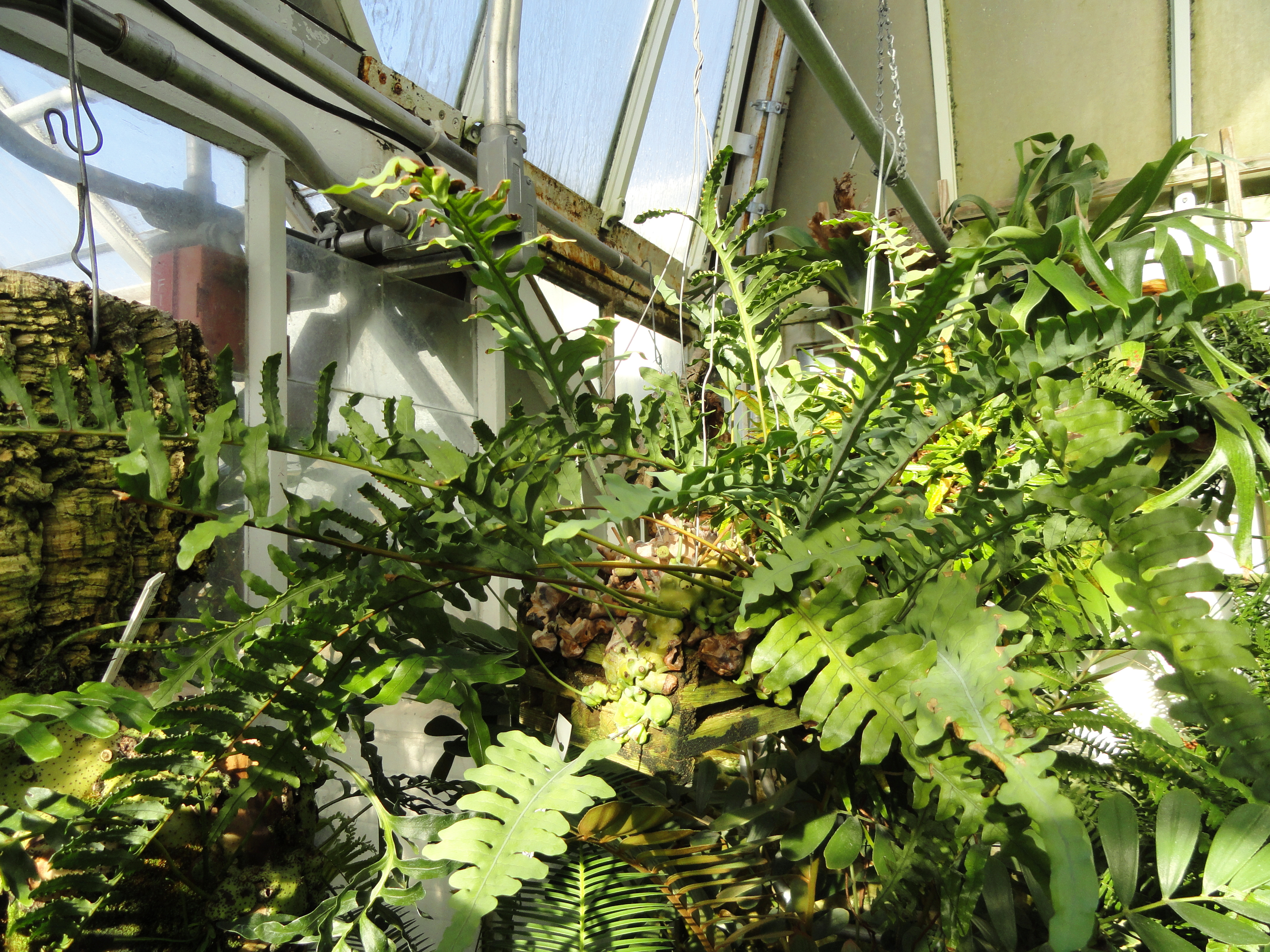
- Lecanopteris curtisii

Scientific classification
- Kingdom: Plantae
- Clade: Tracheophytes
- Division: Polypodiophyta
- Class: Polypodiopsida
- Order: Polypodiales
- Suborder: Polypodiineae
- Family: Polypodiaceae
- Subfamily: Microsoroideae
- Genus: Lecanopteris; Reinw.

Species
- See text.

= Lecanopteris =

Genus of ferns

Lecanopteris is a genus of ferns in the family Polypodiaceae, subfamily Microsoroideae, according to the Pteridophyte Phylogeny Group classification of 2016 (PPG I). They have swollen hollow rhizomes that provide homes for symbiotic ants. All are epiphytic plants that naturally occur from Southeast Asia to New Guinea. Several species are in commerce, being grown as houseplants and greenhouse curiosities.

== Taxonomy ==
=== Phylogeny ===
The monophyletic genus Lecanopteris has been divided into two sub-genera, Lecanopteris and Myrmecopteris. All the species have rhizomes associated with ants. Subgenus Lecanopteris was monophyletic, and Myrmecopteris was paraphyletic. A 2019 molecular phylogenetic study suggested that the genus was related to three other clades, treated as genera, related as shown in the following cladogram.

- Lecanopteris s.l.
  - Bosmania
  - - Dendroconche
    - - Zealandia
      - Lecanopteris s.s.

As of February 2020, the Checklist of Ferns and Lycophytes of the World recognizes the segregate genera; other sources do not.

=== Species ===
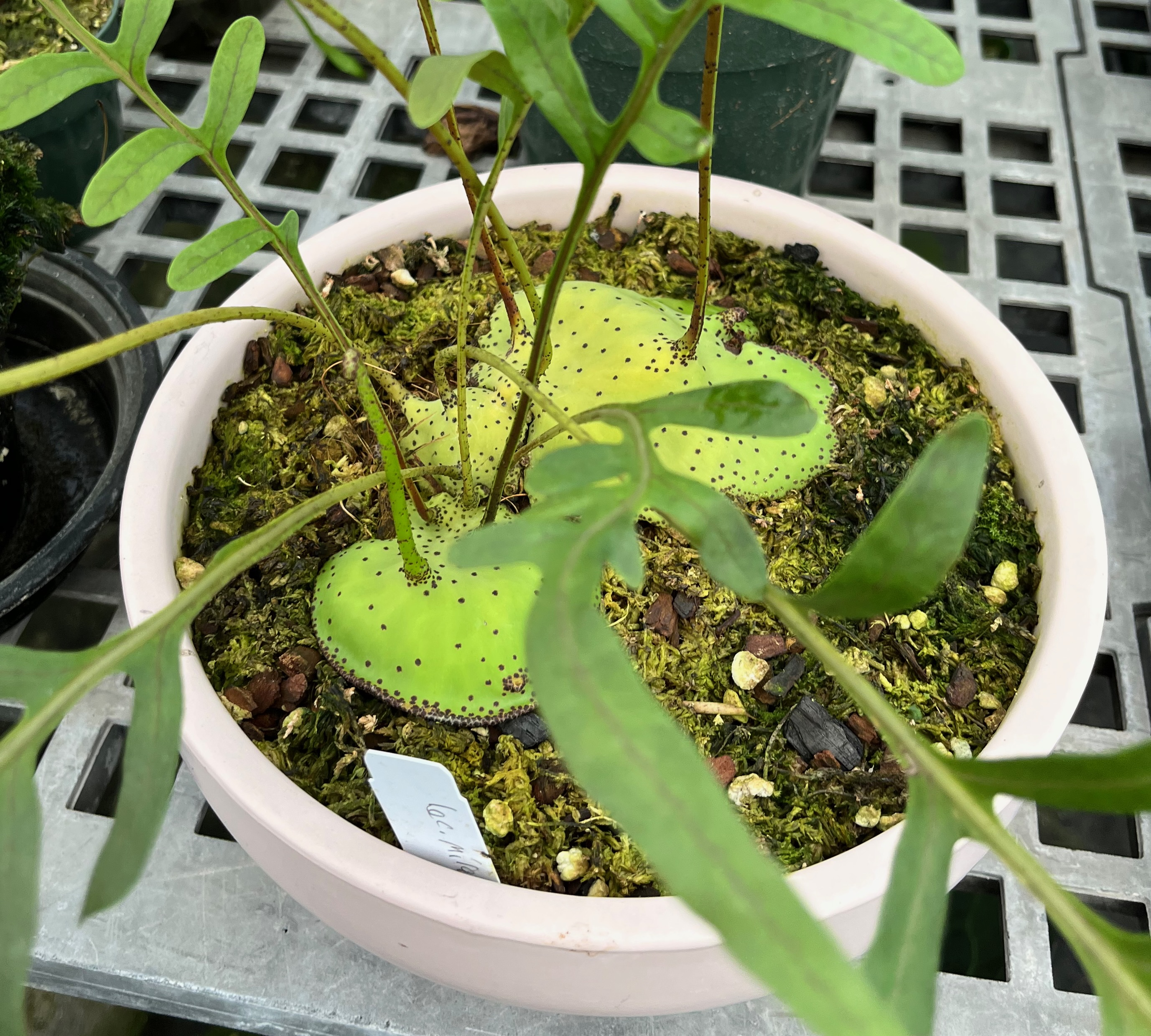
The rhizome of Lecanopteris mirabilis

As of February 2020, the Checklist of Ferns and Lycophytes of the World recognized the following species in Lecanopteris s.s.

- Lecanopteris balgooyi Hennipman
- Lecanopteris carnosa (Reinw.) Blume
- Lecanopteris celebica Hennipman
- Lecanopteris crustacea Copel.
- Lecanopteris darnaedii Hennipman
- Lecanopteris deparioides (Ces.) Baker
- Lecanopteris holttumii Hennipman
- Lecanopteris luzonensis Hennipman
- Lecanopteris mirabilis Copel.
- Lecanopteris pumila Blume
- Lecanopteris sarcopus (Teijsm. & Binn.) Copel.
- Lecanopteris sinuosa (Wall. ex Hook.) Copel.
- Lecanopteris spinosa Jermy & T.Walker
