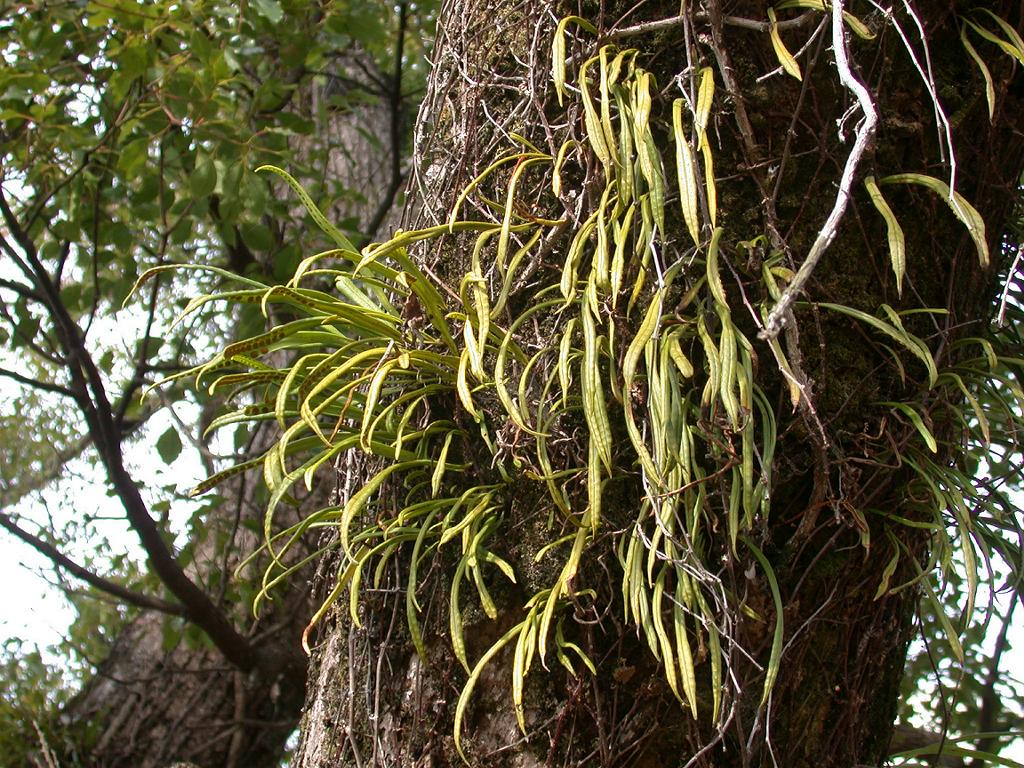
- Lepisorus thunbergianus in Japan

Scientific classification
- Kingdom: Plantae
- Clade: Tracheophytes
- Division: Polypodiophyta
- Class: Polypodiopsida
- Order: Polypodiales
- Suborder: Polypodiineae
- Family: Polypodiaceae
- Subfamily: Microsoroideae
- Genus: Lepisorus (J.Sm.) Ching

Species
- See text.

Synonyms
- Belvisia Mirb.; Drymotaenium Makino; Hyalolepis Kunze; Hymenolepis Kaulf.; Macroplethus C.Presl; Platygyria Ching & S.K.Wu; Drynaria sect. Lepisorus J.Sm.; Weatherbya Copel.

= Lepisorus =

Genus of ferns

Lepisorus is a genus of ferns in the family Polypodiaceae, subfamily Microsoroideae, according to the Pteridophyte Phylogeny Group classification of 2016 (PPG I).

== Taxonomy ==
Lepisorus was first described by John Smith in 1846 as the section Lepisorus of the genus Drynaria. It was raised from a section to a genus by Ren-Chang Ching in 1933. A molecular phylogenetic study in 2019 suggested that Lepisorus was one of a group of closely related genera in the subfamily Microsoroideae, a group the authors termed "Lepisorus sensu lato".

- Lepisorus s.l.
  - - Lemmaphyllum
    - Lepidomicrosorium + Neocheiropteris + Neolepisorus + Tricholepidium
  - - Lepisorus s.s.
    - Paragramma (as Lepisorus longifolius)

=== Species ===
As of February 2020, the Checklist of Ferns and Lycophytes of the World recognized the following species:

- Lepisorus abbreviatus (Fée) Li Wang
- Lepisorus accedens (Blume) Hosok.
- Lepisorus affinis Ching
- Lepisorus albertii (Regel) Ching
- Lepisorus amaurolepidus (Sledge) Bir & Trikha
- Lepisorus annamensis (C.Chr.) Li Wang
- Lepisorus annuifrons (Makino) Ching
- Lepisorus balteiformis (Brause) Hovenkamp
- Lepisorus bicolor (Takeda) Ching
- Lepisorus boninensis Ching
- Lepisorus cespitosus Y.X.Lin
- Lepisorus clathratus (C.B.Clarke) Ching
- Lepisorus confluens W.M.Chu
- Lepisorus contortus (Christ) Ching
- Lepisorus crassipes Ching & Y.X.Lin
- Lepisorus eilophyllus (Diels) Ching
- Lepisorus elegans Ching & W.M.Chu
- Lepisorus excavatus (Bory ex Willd.) Ching
- Lepisorus hachijoensis Sa. Kurata
- Lepisorus henryi (Hieron. ex C.Chr.) Li Wang
- Lepisorus heterolepis (Rosenst.) Ching
- Lepisorus jakonensis (Blanf.) Ching
- Lepisorus kawakamii (Hayata) Tagawa
- Lepisorus kolesnikovii (Tzvelev) Shmakov
- Lepisorus kuchenensis (Y.C.Wu) Ching
- Lepisorus kuratae T.Fujiw. & Seriz.
- Lepisorus lewisii (Baker) Ching
- Lepisorus likiangensis Ching & S.K.Wu
- Lepisorus lineariformis Ching & S.K.Wu
- Lepisorus loriformis (Wall. ex Mett.) Ching
- Lepisorus luchunensis Y.X.Lin
- Lepisorus macrosphaerus (Baker) Ching
- Lepisorus mamas Hovenkamp
- Lepisorus marginatus Ching
- Lepisorus medogensis Ching & Y.X.Lin
- Lepisorus megasorus (C.Chr.) Ching
- Lepisorus mehrae Fraser-Jenk.
- Lepisorus mikawanus Kurata
- Lepisorus miyoshianus (Makino) Fraser-Jenk. & Subh.Chandra
- Lepisorus monilisorus (Hayata) Tagawa
- Lepisorus morrisonensis (Hayata) H.Itô
- Lepisorus mucronatus (Fée) Li Wang
- Lepisorus nigripes T.Fujiw. & Seriz.
- Lepisorus novoguineensis (Rosenst.) Li Wang
- Lepisorus nudus (Hook.) Ching
- Lepisorus obscurevenulosus (Hayata) Ching
- Lepisorus oligolepidus (Baker) Ching
- Lepisorus onoei (Franch. & Sav.) Ching
- Lepisorus oosphaerus (C.Chr.) Ching
- Lepisorus perrierianus (C.Chr.) Ching
- Lepisorus platyrhynchos (J.Sm. ex Kunze) Li Wang
- Lepisorus pseudonudus Ching
- Lepisorus pseudoussuriensis Tagawa
- Lepisorus schraderi (Mett.) Ching
- Lepisorus scolopendrium (Ching) Mehra & Bir
- Lepisorus sinensis (Christ) Ching
- Lepisorus sordidus (C.Chr.) Ching
- Lepisorus spicatus (L.f.) Li Wang
- Lepisorus subconfluens Ching
- Lepisorus sublinearis (Baker ex Takeda) Ching
- Lepisorus suboligolepidus Ching
- Lepisorus subsessile Ching & Y.X.Lin
- Lepisorus thaipaiensis Ching & S.K.Wu
- Lepisorus thunbergianus (Kaulf.) Ching
- Lepisorus tosaensis (Makino) H.Itô
- Lepisorus tricholepis K.H.Shing & Y.X.Lin
- Lepisorus uchiyamae (Makino) H.Itô
- Lepisorus ussuriensis (Regel & Mack.) Ching
- Lepisorus validinervis (Kunze) Li Wang
- Lepisorus yamaokae Seriz.

As of February 2020, Plants of the World Online sank the monotypic Paragramma into Lepisorus, thus including the sole species Paragramma longifolia as Lepisorus longifolius.
