= Paragramma =

Scientific classification
- Kingdom: Plantae
- Clade: Tracheophytes
- Division: Polypodiophyta
- Class: Polypodiopsida
- Order: Polypodiales
- Suborder: Polypodiineae
- Family: Polypodiaceae
- Subfamily: Microsoroideae
- Genus: Paragramma (Blume) T.Moore
- Species: P. longifolia

Binomial name
- Paragramma longifolia (Blume) T.Moore

Synonyms
- Genus: Grammitis sect. Paragramma Blume; Species: Drynaria revoluta J.Sm.; Grammitis decurrens Blume; Grammitis longifolia Blume; Lepisorus longifolius (Blume) Holttum; Leptochilus neopothifolia (Wall. ex Hook.& Grev.) Nakaike; Microsorum longifolium (Blume) Copel.; Niphobolus longifolius (Blume) Keyserl.; Paragramma decurrens (Blume) Moore; Phymatodes longifolia (Blume) J.Sm.; Phymatodes revoluta (J.Sm.) Tardieu & C.Chr.; Phymatosorus longifolius (Blume) Bosman & Fraser-Jenk.; Pleopeltis decurrens Blume; Pleopeltis longifolia (Blume) Bedd.; Pleopeltis revoluta (J.Sm.) Alderw.; Polypodium contiguum Hook.; Polypodium decurrens (Blume) Kunze; Polypodium longifolium (Blume) Mett.; Polypodium productum Christ; Polypodium revolutum (J.Sm.) C.Chr.

Genus of ferns

Paragramma is a genus of ferns in the family Polypodiaceae, subfamily Microsoroideae according to the Pteridophyte Phylogeny Group classification of 2016 (PPG I). There is a single species, Paragramma longifolia. Other sources do not accept the genus, submerging it into Lepisorus, with Paragramma longifolia becoming Lepisorus longifolius (Blume) Holttum. A molecular phylogenetic study in 2019 showed that Lepisorus longifolius was sister to all the remaining species of Lepisorus, which formed a clade.
