= Phymatopsis =

Phymatopsis may refer to:

- a synonym for Selliguea, a fern genus
- Leptotarsus subg. Phymatopsis, a subgenus in the crane flies genus Leptotarsus
