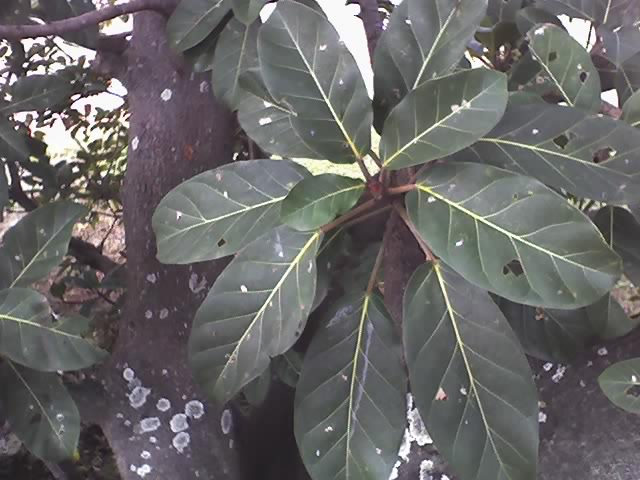

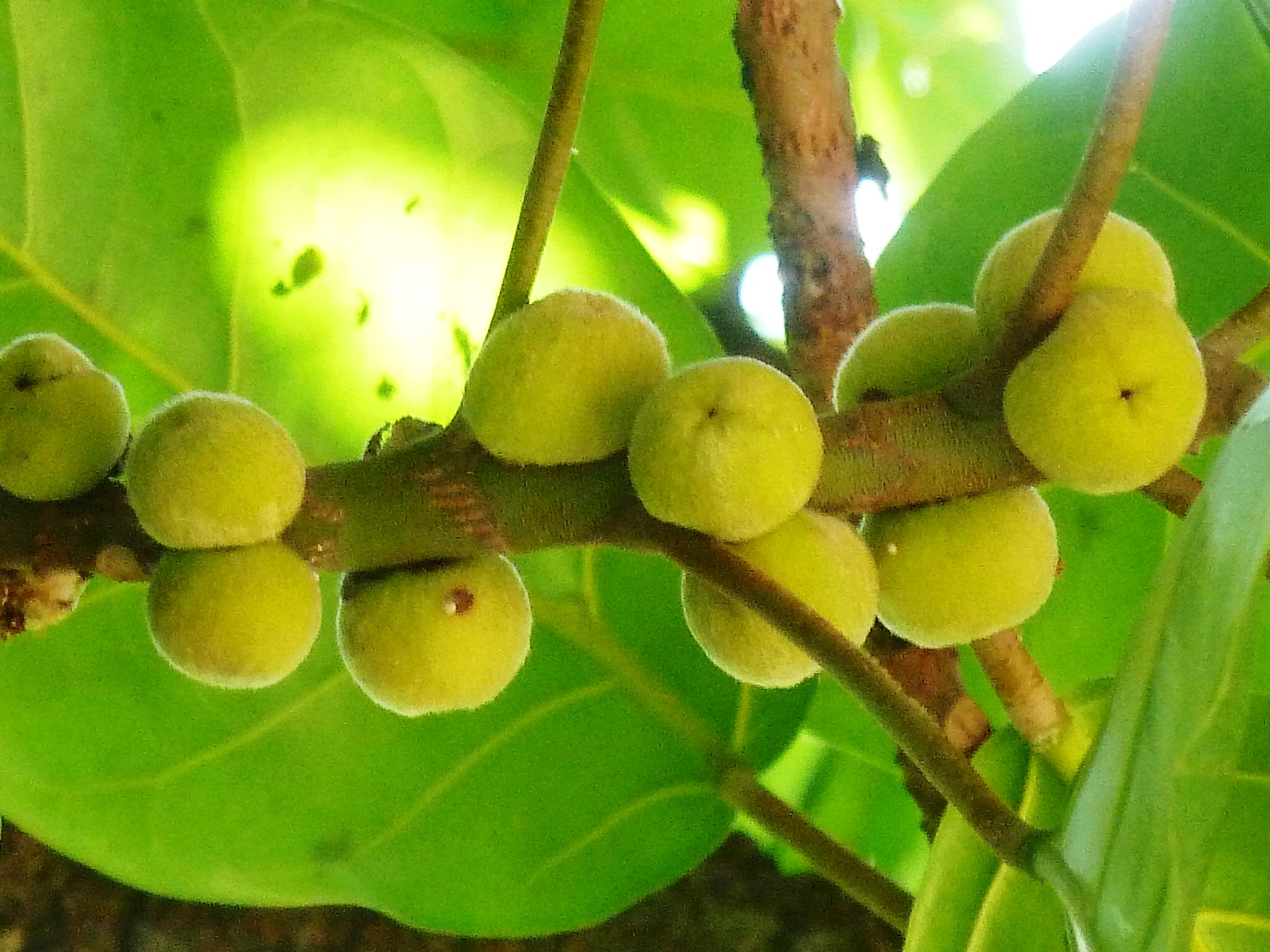

Conservation status
- Least Concern (IUCN 3.1)

Scientific classification
- Kingdom: Plantae
- Clade: Tracheophytes
- Clade: Angiosperms
- Clade: Eudicots
- Clade: Rosids
- Order: Rosales
- Family: Moraceae
- Genus: Ficus
- Species: F. lutea

Binomial name
- Ficus lutea Vahl

Synonyms
- Synonymy: Ficus akaie De Wild.; Ficus apodocephala Baker; Ficus arimensis Britton; Ficus baronii Baker; Ficus cabrae Warb.; Ficus holstii Warb.; Ficus incognita De Wild.; Ficus kaba De Wild.; Ficus lanigera Warb.; Ficus nautarum Baker; Ficus nekbudu Warb.; Ficus neumannii Cels ex K.Koch & C.D.Bouché; Ficus pachyclada Baker, nom. illeg. homonym. post.; Ficus pseudovogelii A.Chev.; Ficus quibeba Welw. ex Ficalho; Ficus senegalensis Miq.; Ficus subcalcarata Warb. & Schweinf; Ficus subcalcarata var. vestitobracteata (Warb.) Mildbr. & Burret; Ficus trichosphaera Baker; Ficus utilis Sim; Ficus verrucocarpa Warb.; Ficus vestitobracteata Warb.; Ficus vogelii (Miq.) Miq.; Ficus vogelii var. pubicarpa Mildbr. & Burret; Urostigma luteum Miq.; Urostigma neumannii (Cels ex K.Koch & C.D.Bouché) Miq.; Urostigma vogelii Miq.

= Ficus lutea =

Giant-leaved fig

Species of flowering plant

Ficus lutea is a medium to large sized deciduous tree in the family Moraceae. It is commonly known as the giant-leaved fig or Lagos rubbertree. These trees occur across Tropical Africa to KwaZulu-Natal in South Africa.

The species was described by Martin Vahl in 1805.

== Description ==
Ficus lutea is a tree that grows up to 25 m (82 ft) in height, its crown is large and spreading, while the bark is brownish to dark grey; when in open areas, the trunk is commonly short with buttressed roots but in forest environments, the trunks tend to be longer. Leaves of Ficus lutea clusters at the end of branches, reaches up to 43 cm (17 in) in length and 20 cm (7.9 in) in width, the outline of leaves are ovate to elliptical with an acuminate apex and the base is cordate or rounded, the surface is glossy . Figs borne in leaf axils or on bare twigs below the leaves, they reach up to 30 mm (1.2 in) in diameter and are densely hairy especially when young.

== Distribution and habitat ==
The species occurs in riparian forests, woodlands and evergreen forests in western, central, eastern, and southern tropical Africa, as well as Madagascar, the Comoros, Seychelles, and Cape Verde Islands.

== Chemistry ==
Chemical compounds isolated from the extracts of the plant include α-Tocopherol, epiafzelechin, phytol, beta-sitosterol, lupeol, b-amyrin, and b-amyrin acetate.
