= Arthromeris elegans =

Scientific classification
- Kingdom: Plantae
- Clade: Tracheophytes
- Division: Polypodiophyta
- Class: Polypodiopsida
- Order: Polypodiales
- Suborder: Polypodiineae
- Family: Polypodiaceae
- Genus: Arthromeris
- Species: A. elegans

Binomial name
- Arthromeris elegans Ching, 1941

Synonyms
- Arthromeris elegans fo. elegans 2000; Arthromeris elegans fo. pianmaensis S.G. Lu, 1998

Species of fern

Arthromeris elegans is a species of ferns in the subfamily Drynarioideae. It is found in Burma, China (Xizang Zizhiqu and Yunnan) and India (Darjeeling).
