= Geranin A =

- Chemical structure of geranin A

Names
- IUPAC name (1S,5R,6S,13R,21S)-5,13-bis(4-hydroxyphenyl)-4,12,14-trioxapentacyclo[11.7.1.02,11.03,8.015,20]henicosa-2(11),3(8),9,15,17,19-hexaene-6,9,17,19,21-pentol
- Other names Epi-afzelechin-(4β→8, 2β→O→7)-afzelechin

Identifiers
CAS Number	226715-59-9
3D model (JSmol)	Interactive image
ChEMBL	ChEMBL2431897
ChemSpider	23339046
PubChem CID	5317050
- InChI: InChI=1S/C30H24O10/c31-15-5-1-13(2-6-15)27-21(36)11-18-19(34)12-23-25(28(18)38-27)26-24-20(35)9-17(33)10-22(24)39-30(40-23,29(26)37)14-3-7-16(32)8-4-14/h1-10,12,21,26-27,29,31-37H,11H2/t21-,26-,27+,29-,30+/m0/s1 Key: LQRHGTVFFPMWCG-VCFSXNJSSA-N
- SMILES: Oc4cc3OC(C2O)(c(cc6)ccc6O)Oc5cc(O)cc(O)c5C2c3c(c4CC1O)OC1c(cc7)ccc7O

Properties
Chemical formula	C_{30}H_{24}O_{10}
Molar mass	544.50 g/mol
- Except where otherwise noted, data are given for materials in their standard state (at 25 °C [77 °F], 100 kPa). Infobox references

Geranin A is an A type proanthocyanidin of the propelargonidin sub type. Its structure is epi-afzelechin-(4β→8, 2β→O→7)-afzelechin.

Geranins A and B can be found in Geranium niveum and show antiprotozoal activity.
