= Polypodiopteris =

Scientific classification
- Kingdom: Plantae
- Clade: Embryophytes
- Clade: Tracheophytes
- Division: Polypodiophyta
- Class: Polypodiopsida
- Order: Polypodiales
- Suborder: Polypodiineae
- Family: Polypodiaceae
- Subfamily: Drynarioideae
- Genus: Polypodiopteris; C.F.Reed

Species
- See text.

Synonyms

Genus of ferns

Polypodiopteris is a genus of ferns in the family Polypodiaceae, subfamily Drynarioideae, according to the Pteridophyte Phylogeny Group classification of 2016 (PPG I).

== Taxonomy ==
Polypodiopteris was first described by C.F. Reed in 1948.

=== Species ===
In the Pteridophyte Phylogeny Group classification of 2016 (PPG I), the genus has three species. As of February 2020, the Checklist of Ferns and Lycophytes of the World placed all three in a more broadly circumscribed genus Selliguea:

- Polypodiopteris brachypodia (Copel.) C.F.Reed
- Polypodiopsis colorata (Copel.) Copel.
- Polypodiopsis proavita (Copel.) Copel.

As of February 2020, Plants of the World Online also sank the genus into Selliguea.
