= Propelargonidin =

Propelargonidins are a type of condensed tannins formed from epiafzelechin. They yield pelargonidin when depolymerized under oxidative conditions.

Propelargonidins can be found in the rhizomes of the fern Drynaria fortunei, in buckwheat (Fagopyrum esculentum), and in the edible halophyte Carpobrotus edulis.

== Examples ==
- Geranins A and B, dimers found in Geranium niveum
- Selligueain A, a trimer found in the rhizome of Selliguea feei
- the trimeric propelargonidin epiafzelechin-(4β→8)-epiafzelechin-(4β→8)-4′-O-methyl-(−)-epigallocatechin can be isolated from the stem bark of Heisteria pallida.
