= S. hastata =

S. hastata may refer to:

- Salvinia hastata, a floating fern species in the genus Salvinia
- Selliguea hastata, a fern species

== See also ==
- Hastata (disambiguation)
