= Leptotarsus testaceus =

Scientific classification
- Kingdom: Animalia
- Phylum: Arthropoda
- Class: Insecta
- Order: Diptera
- Family: Tipulidae
- Genus: Leptotarsus
- Species: L. testaceus

Binomial name
- Leptotarsus testaceus (Loew, 1869)

Synonyms
- Longurio testaceus Loew, 1869

Species of fly

Leptotarsus testaceus is a species of large crane fly in the family Tipulidae.
