= Selligueain A =

- Chemical structure of selligueain A

Names
- Other names Epiafzelechin-(4β-8,2β-0-7)-epiafzelechin-(4β-8)-afzelechin

Identifiers
CAS Number	152378-18-2
3D model (JSmol)	Interactive image
ChemSpider	117326
PubChem CID	132944
CompTox Dashboard (EPA)	DTXSID10934488
- InChI: InChI=1S/C45H36O15/c46-21-7-1-18(2-8-21)40-30(54)15-25-26(50)16-28(52)34(42(25)57-40)37-35-29(53)17-32-36(43(35)58-41(39(37)55)19-3-9-22(47)10-4-19)38-33-27(51)13-24(49)14-31(33)59-45(60-32,44(38)56)20-5-11-23(48)12-6-20/h1-14,16-17,30,37-41,44,46-56H,15H2/t30-,37-,38-,39+,40+,41+,44?,45+/m0/s1 Key: PMDYNLFGCCRGRX-NSJNBNEDSA-N
- SMILES: C1C(C(OC2=C1C(=CC(=C2C3C(C(OC4=C5C6C(C(OC7=CC(=CC(=C67)O)O)(OC5=CC(=C34)O)C8=CC=C(C=C8)O)O)C9=CC=C(C=C9)O)O)O)O)C1=CC=C(C=C1)O)O

Properties
Chemical formula	C_{45}H_{36}O_{15}
Molar mass	816.75 g/mol
- Except where otherwise noted, data are given for materials in their standard state (at 25 °C [77 °F], 100 kPa). verify (what is ?) Infobox references

Selligueain A is an A type proanthocyanidin trimer of the propelargonidin type.

It can be extracted from the rhizome of the fern Selliguea feei collected in Indonesia.

It has sweetener properties with relative sweetness of 35 times as compared to the intensity of a 2% w/v aqueous sucrose solution.
