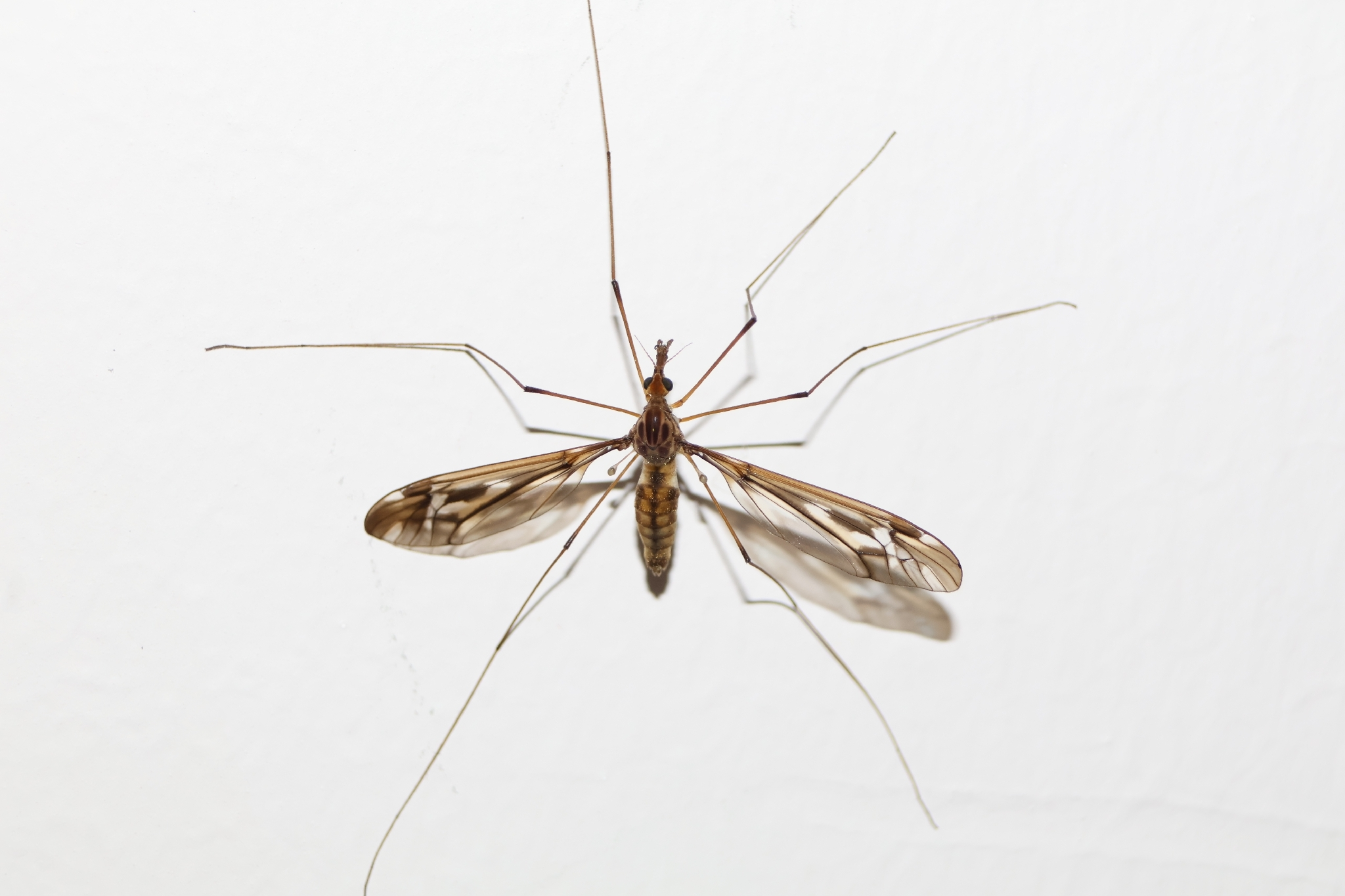

Scientific classification
- Kingdom: Animalia
- Phylum: Arthropoda
- Class: Insecta
- Order: Diptera
- Family: Tipulidae
- Genus: Leptotarsus
- Species: L. huttoni

Binomial name
- Leptotarsus huttoni (Edwards, 1923)

Synonyms
- Leptotarsus (Macromastix) huttoni (Edwards, 1923); Macromastix huttoni Edwards, 1923; Macromastix (Macromastix) huttoni Edwards, 1923

= Leptotarsus huttoni =

Species of crane fly

Leptotarsus huttoni is a species of crane fly in the family Tipulidae. First described as Macromastix huttoni by Frederick Wallace Edwards in 1923, the species is endemic to New Zealand, living near rotting wood on both the North Island and the South Island.

== Taxonomy ==
The species was first described by Frederick Wallace Edwards in 1923 as Macromastix huttoni. In 1968, Nikolas Vladimir Dobrotworsky revised Macromastix, making it a subgenus of Leptotarsus. This led to the current accepted name of the species, Leptotarsus huttoni, or its alternative representation, Leptotarsus (Macromastix) huttoni.

== Description ==
Edwards described the species as follows:

Head dull dark ochreous, scarcely any darker in middle, with some ochreous-grey dusting round eyes. Front about one-quarter as broad as head, tubercle moderate. Rostrum slightly longer than head, rather darker than vertex; nasus with long hairs at tip, which is not bifid. Palpi blackish. Antennae rather dark brown, alike in both sexes; shorter than thorax, first scapal joint slender. First flagellar joint slightly shorter than second, third, or fourth; fifth and sixth shorter; last five thinner and indistinctly separated. Thorax resembling that of M. lunata, but much less hairy, and area above blackish pleural spot is not conspicuously pale. Abdomen much as in M. lunata, but without conspicuous grey dusting on any part; the blackish dorsal line is narrower, especially on second segment. Legs, especially tarsi, distinctly longer and more slender than in M. lunata; femora and tibiae brown with black tips; tarsi-darker. Wings resembling those of M. lunata, but there is a small white streak before humeral cross-vein, and a whitish mark in cell M_{1}; the stem of this cell is shorter (one-fifth to one-eighth as long as the cell). Length of body, 9–10 mm (0.35–0.39 in).; wing, 14–16 mm (0.55–0.63 in).; hind leg, ♂ 38–42 mm (1.5–1.7 in).

== Distribution and habitat ==
The species is endemic to New Zealand, found on both the North Island and South Island. It tends to live in rotting wood.

== Gallery ==
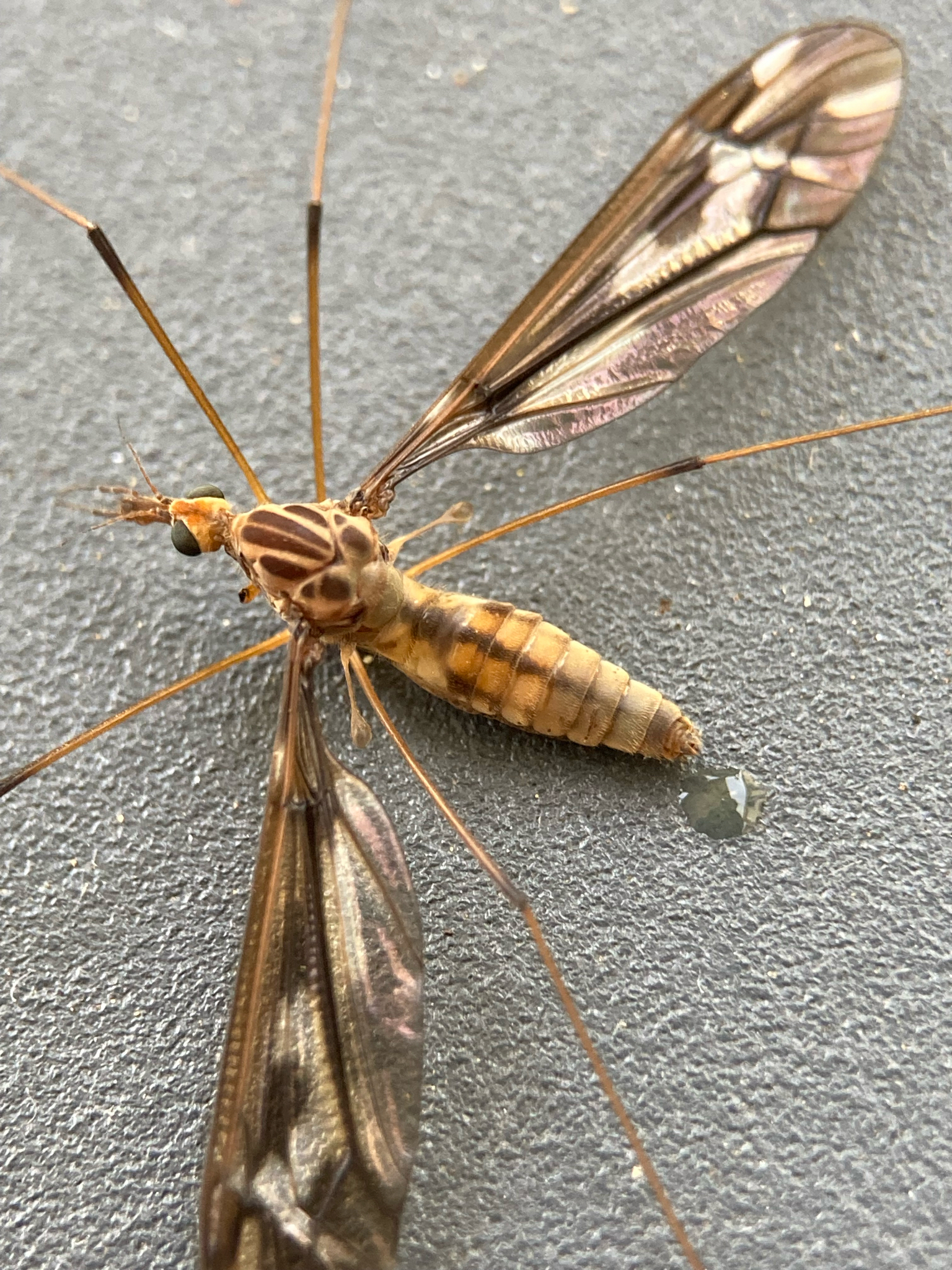
Close-up of body

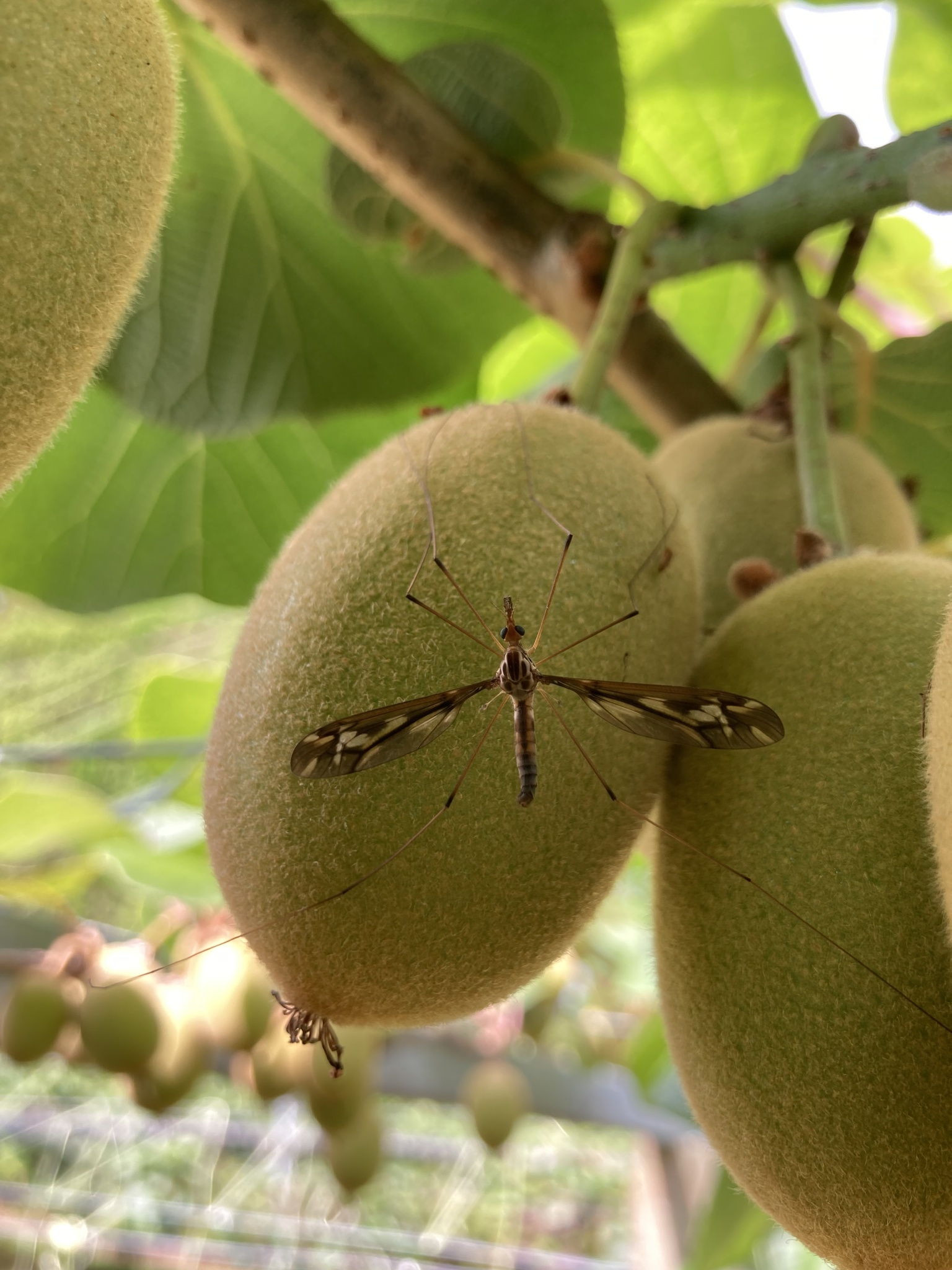
L. huttoni in relation to a kiwifruit

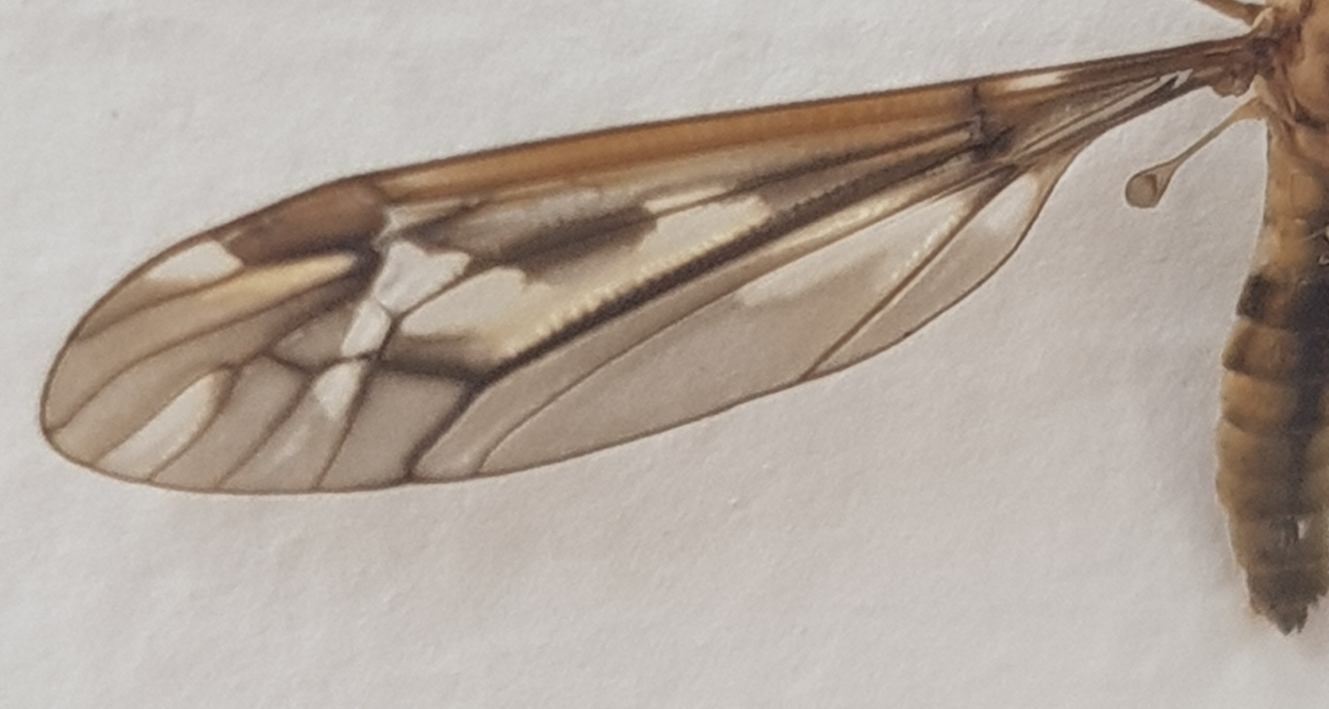
Wing
