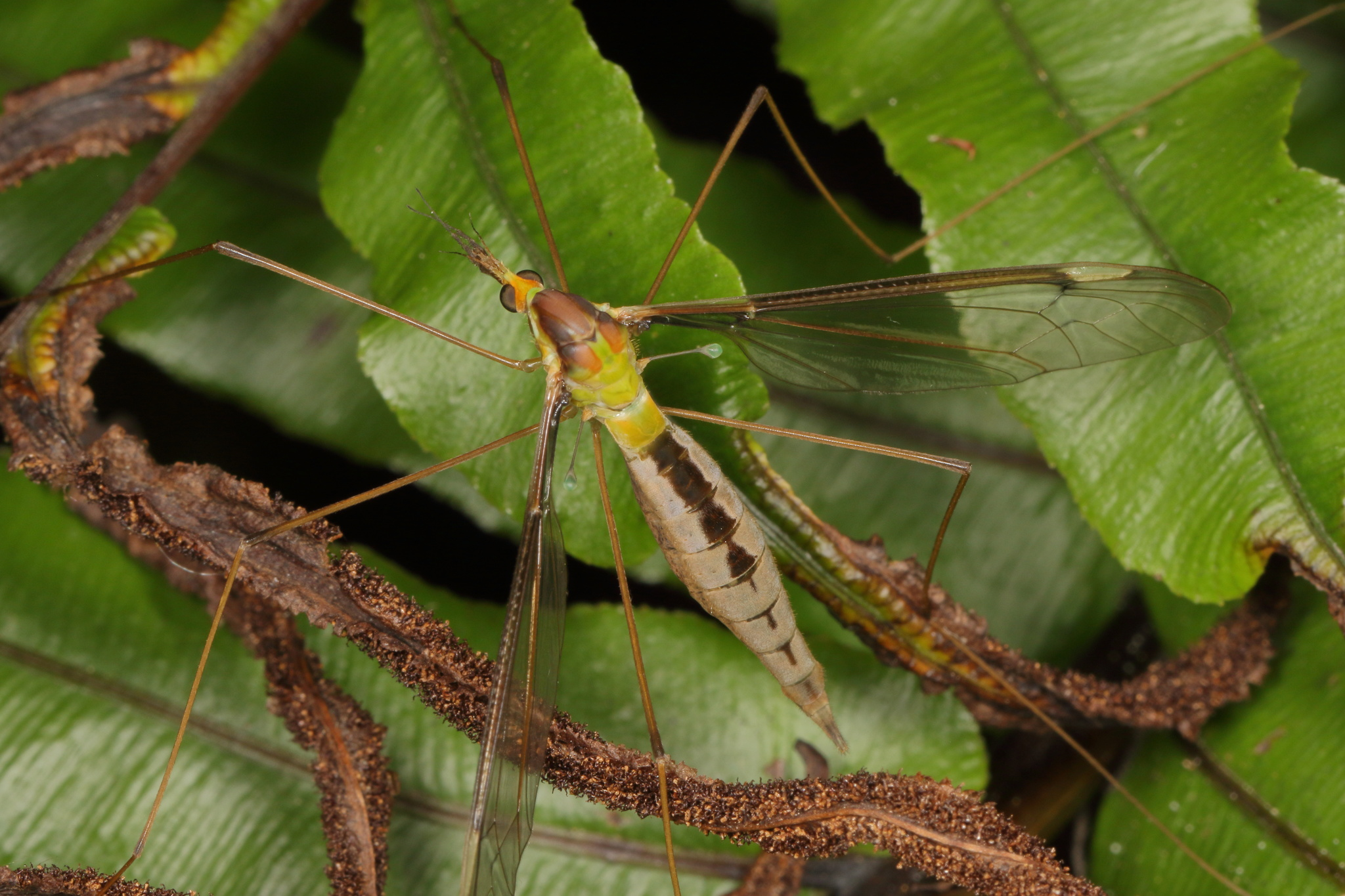

Scientific classification
- Kingdom: Animalia
- Phylum: Arthropoda
- Class: Insecta
- Order: Diptera
- Family: Tipulidae
- Genus: Leptotarsus
- Species: L. albistigma

Binomial name
- Leptotarsus albistigma (Edwards, 1923)

Synonyms
- Chlorotipula albistigma; Leptotarsus (Chlorotipula) albistigma; Macromastix albistigma Edwards, 1923

= Leptotarsus albistigma =

Species of crane fly

Leptotarsus albistigma is a species of crane fly native to New Zealand. The species was first described as Macromastix albistigma by Frederick Wallace Edwards in 1923.

== Description ==
Edwards described the species as follows:

Differs from M. viridis as follows: Middle praescutal stripe obsolete, lateral pair conspicuously darker. Abdomen duller, more ochreous, tip not darkened, with rather broad lateral bands of grey dusting on all tergites except first. Hypopygium smaller, the claspers with a slightly different structure. Legs lighter in colour. Wings distinctly brown-tinged, lower pre-arcular cell, costal and subcostal cells, base of cell R2 and veins dark brown; stigma conspicuously whitish-ochreous. Cell M_{1} sessile in some specimens; cell Ax broadest in the middle. Length of body, ♂ 16–17 mm., ♀ 17–20 mm.; wing, 18–23 mm.; halter, about 3 mm.; hind leg, ♀ 45–50 mm.

Leptotarsus albistigma is pale green in colour. The species' eggs are elliptical and 0.75mm in length. The larvae are between 16.5 mm and 20 mm in length, are moderately flattened and are a cinnamon-like light-brown colour.

== Taxonomy ==
In 1924, Charles Paul Alexander classified the species into a subgenus, Chlorotipula, which included exclusively species from New Zealand. Since this time, the subgenus Chlorotipula has been recategorised and placed within the genus Leptotarsus.

== Distribution ==
The species is endemic to New Zealand. It is commonly found in the South Island, on damp logs of exotic tree species, including rotting Pinus radiata and willow trees.

== Behaviour ==
The larvae of Leptotarsus albistigma bores through wood that has been softened by fungi. Larvae of Austrolimnophila argus, another species of New Zealand crane-fly, have been found together with the larvae of this species.

== Gallery ==
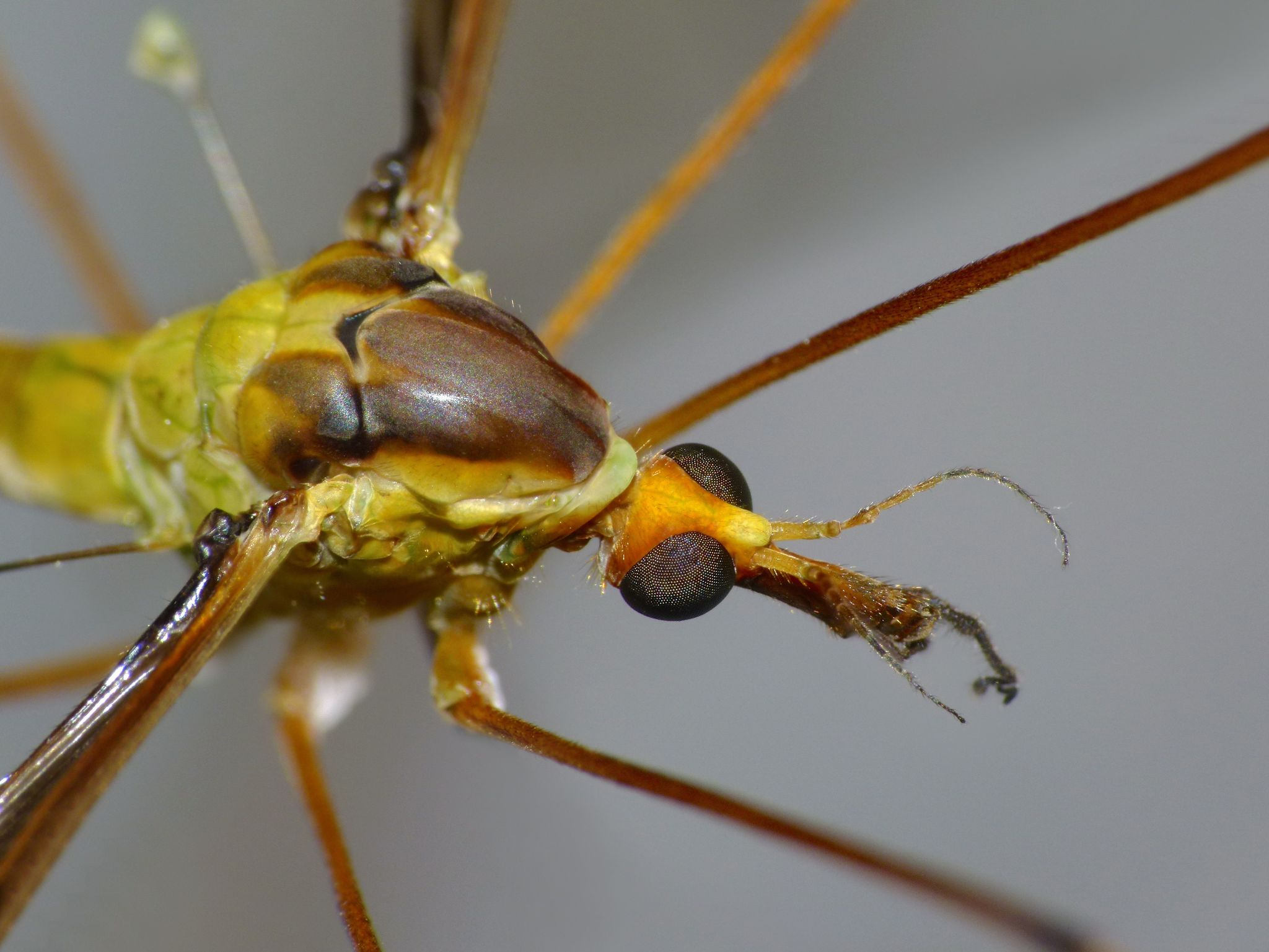
Close-up of facial features of Leptotarsus albistigma

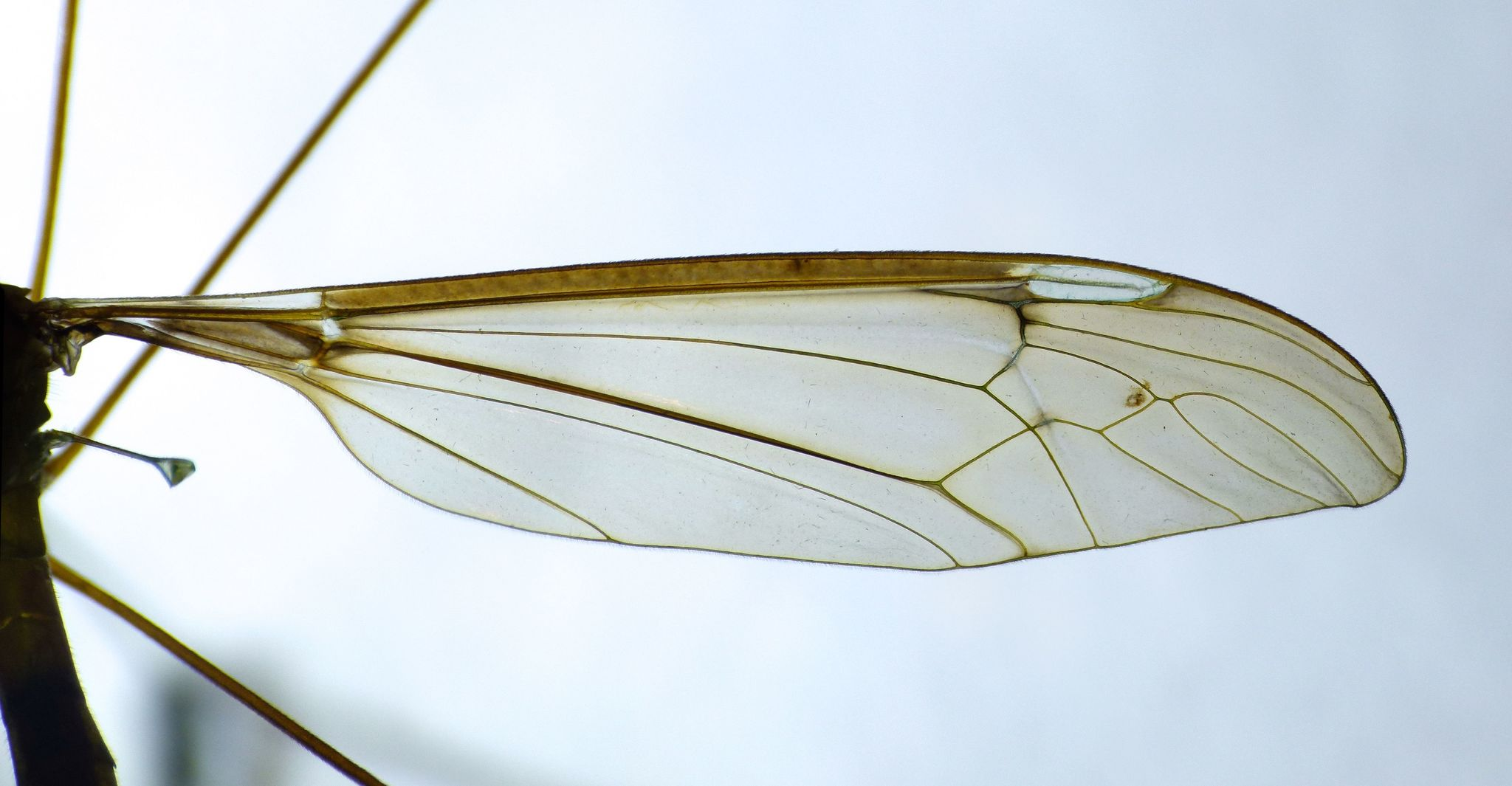
Wing

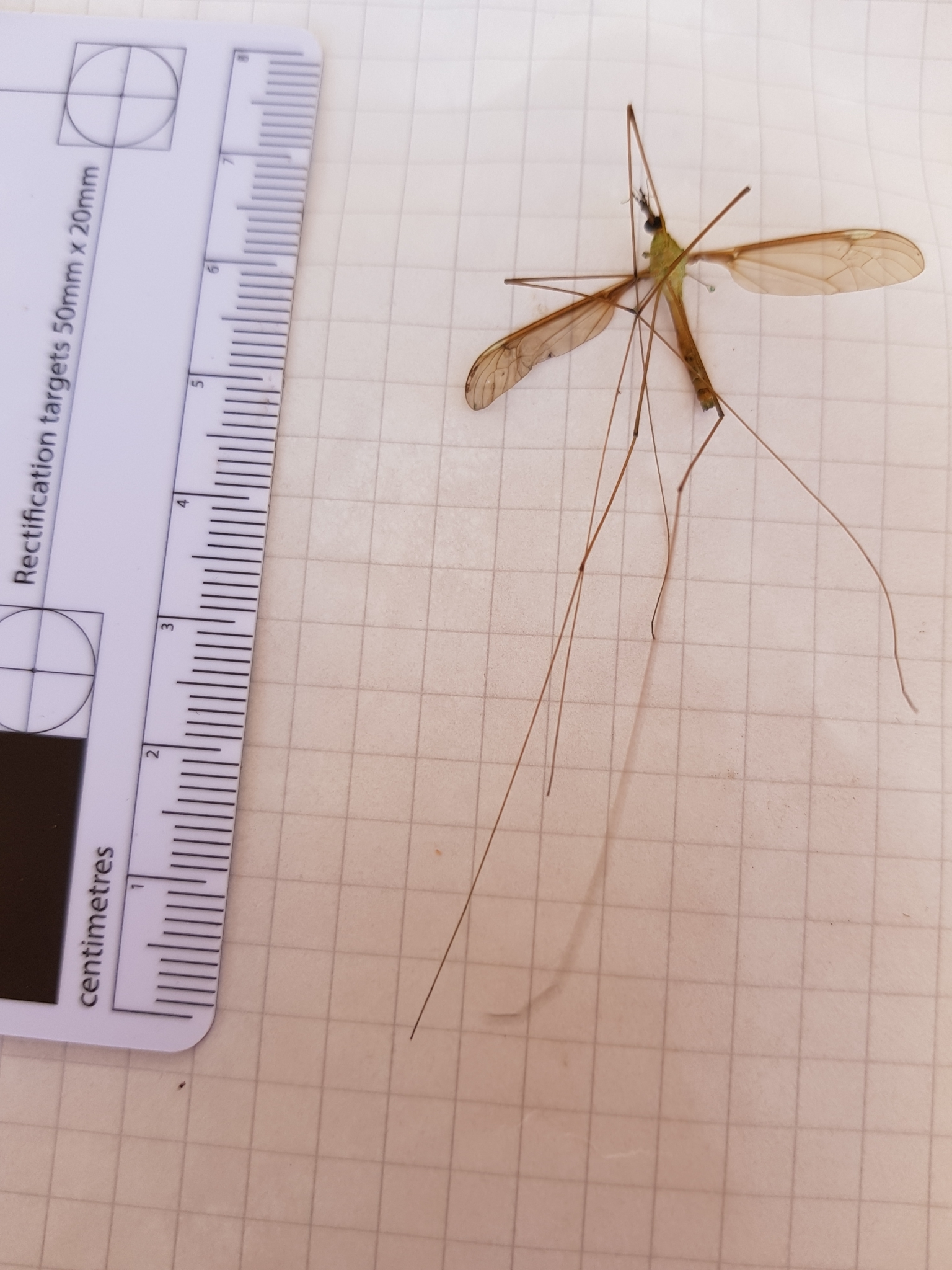
Length of the legs of Leptotarsus albistigma
