= Selliguea plantaginea =

Scientific classification
- Kingdom: Plantae
- Clade: Tracheophytes
- Division: Polypodiophyta
- Class: Polypodiopsida
- Order: Polypodiales
- Suborder: Polypodiineae
- Family: Polypodiaceae
- Genus: Selliguea
- Species: S. plantaginea

Binomial name
- Selliguea plantaginea Brack. (1854)
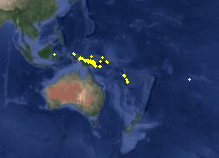
- Occurrence data from GBIF

Synonyms
- Crypsinus caudaeformis Gilli (1978); Pleopeltis brevidecurrens Alderw. (1922); Pleopeltis werneri (Rosenst.) Alderw. (1909); Polypodium alloiosorum Brause (1920); Polypodium mafuluense C.Chr. (1937); Polypodium werneri Rosenst. (1908); Selliguea alloiosora (Brause) Ching (1940); Selliguea werneri (Rosenst.) Pic.Serm. (1977)

Species of fern

Selliguea plantaginea is a fern species in the genus Selliguea.

A holotype, collected on the Iles du Vent, Tahiti, in 1838 during the Wilkes expedition, is held at United States National Herbarium, Smithsonian Institution (Herbarium code: US)

== Description ==
Selliguea plantaginea has often been confused with S. feeoides, but differs in that S. feeoides has frequent hydathodes on the upper surface of the fronds, while in S. plantaginea, hydathodes are absent or infrequent.

== Distribution ==
Selliguea plantaginea has been found in Sulawesi, New Guinea, the Bismarck Archipelago, Solomon Islands, Vanuatu, Fiji, and the Society Islands (Tahiti and Huahine).

== Images ==
Sets of images from specimens found in the cloud forest on Mount Tohiea, Mo'orea may be found at http://n2t.net/ark:/21547/R2MBIO36935 and http://n2t.net/ark:/21547/R2MBIO40051.
