= Arthromeris mairei =

Scientific classification
- Kingdom: Plantae
- Clade: Tracheophytes
- Division: Polypodiophyta
- Class: Polypodiopsida
- Order: Polypodiales
- Suborder: Polypodiineae
- Family: Polypodiaceae
- Genus: Arthromeris
- Species: A. mairei

Binomial name
- Arthromeris mairei (Brause) Ching

Species of fern

Arthromeris mairei is a fern species in the genus Arthromeris.

Two afzelechin glycosides, arthromerin A (afzelechin-3-O-β-D-xylopyranoside) and arthromerin B (afzelechin-3-O-β-D-glucopyranoside), can be isolated from the roots of A. mairei.
