= Arthromeris =

Scientific classification
- Kingdom: Plantae
- Clade: Tracheophytes
- Division: Polypodiophyta
- Class: Polypodiopsida
- Order: Polypodiales
- Suborder: Polypodiineae
- Family: Polypodiaceae
- Subfamily: Drynarioideae
- Genus: Arthromeris (T.Moore) J.Sm.

Species
- Arthromeris cyrtomioides S. G. Lu & C. D. Xu; Arthromeris elegans Ching; Arthromeris lehmanni (Mett.) Ching; Arthromeris lehmannii; Arthromeris mairei; Arthromeris moulmeinensis; Arthromeris proteus; Arthromeris repandula Ching; Arthromeris repandula var. nainitalensis; Arthromeris wallichiana

Genus of ferns

Arthromeris is a genus of ferns in the family Polypodiaceae, subfamily Drynarioideae, according to the Pteridophyte Phylogeny Group classification of 2016 (PPG I).
