= Geranium niveum =

Scientific classification
- Kingdom: Plantae
- Clade: Tracheophytes
- Clade: Angiosperms
- Clade: Eudicots
- Clade: Rosids
- Order: Geraniales
- Family: Geraniaceae
- Genus: Geranium
- Species: G. niveum

Binomial name
- Geranium niveum S. Watson 1886

Species of flowering plant

Geranium niveum is a plant species in the genus Geranium.

It is a medicinal herb widely used by the Tarahumara Indians of Mexico.

Geranin A (epi-afzelechin-(4β→8, 2β→O→7)-afzelechin), geranin B (epi-catechin-(4β→8, 2β→O→7)-afzelechin), mahuannin B, reynoutrin, hyperin, methyl gallate and 3-beta-caffeoyl-12-oleanen-28-oic acid can be found in G. niveum.
