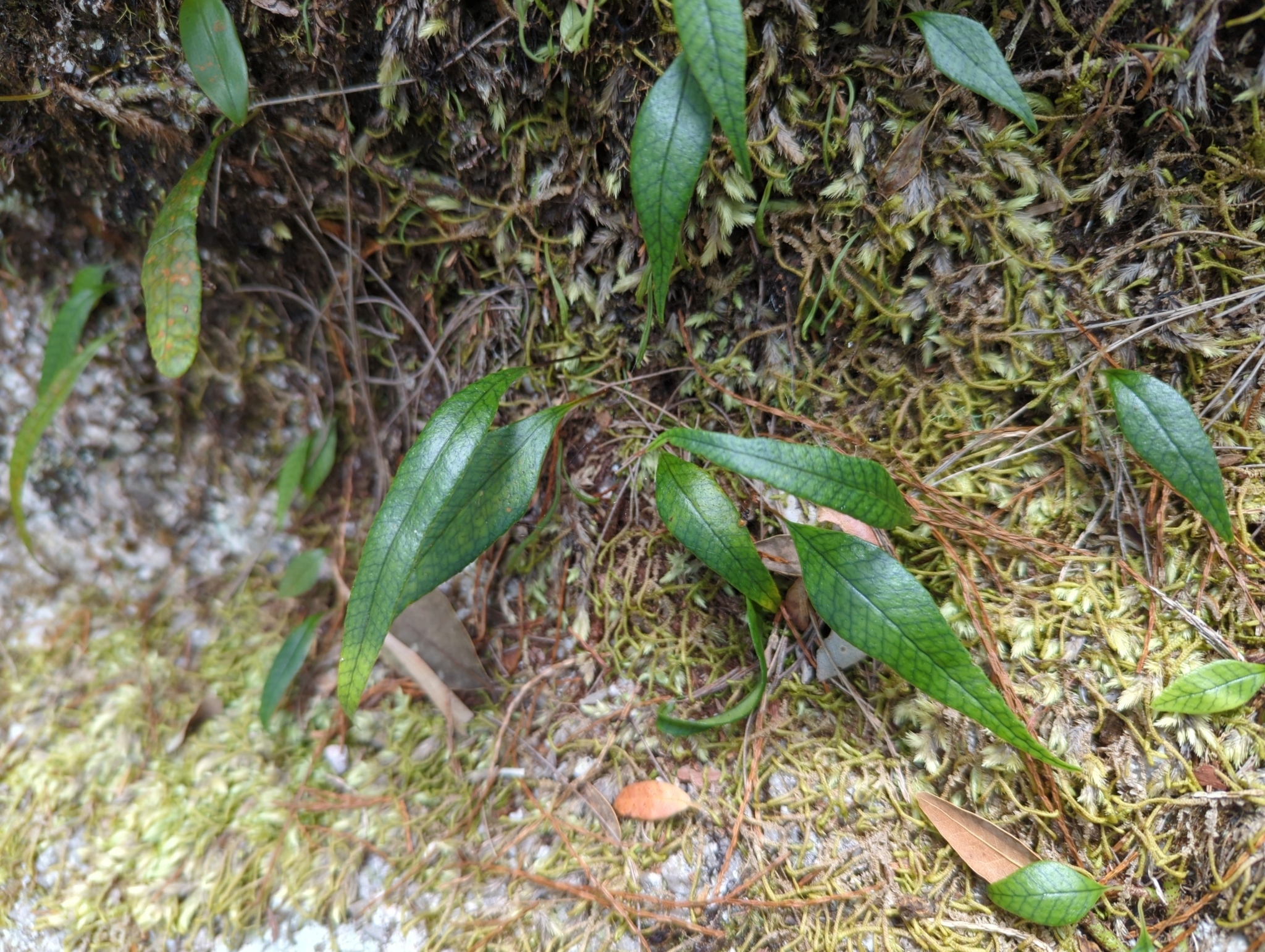

Conservation status
- Least Concern (NCA)

Scientific classification
- Kingdom: Plantae
- Clade: Embryophytes
- Clade: Tracheophytes
- Division: Polypodiophyta
- Class: Polypodiopsida
- Order: Polypodiales
- Suborder: Polypodiineae
- Family: Polypodiaceae
- Genus: Selliguea
- Species: S. simplicissima

Binomial name
- Selliguea simplicissima Hovenkamp
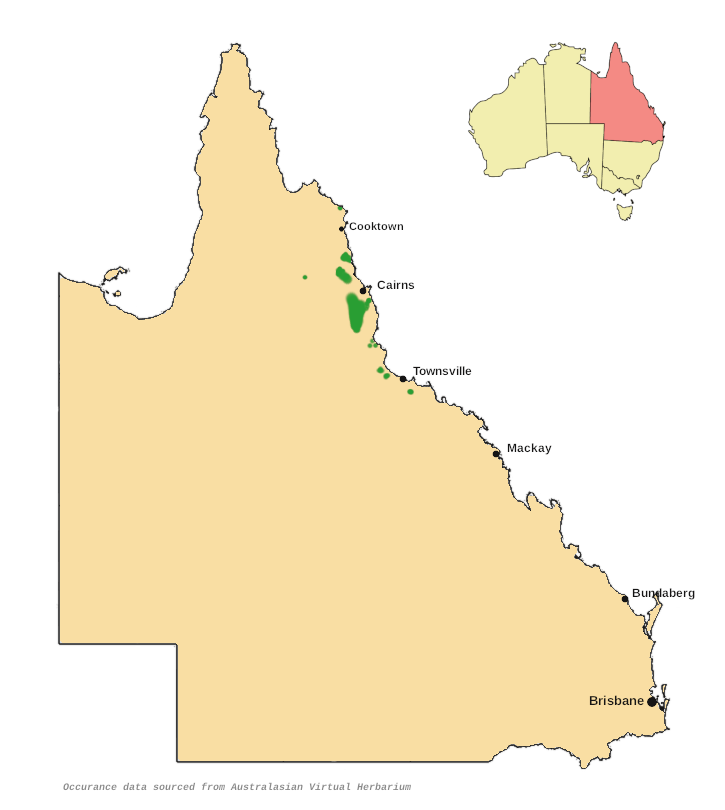

Synonyms
- 7 synonyms: Crypsinus simplicissimus (F.Muell.) S.B.Andrews; Phymatopteris simplicissima (F.Muell.) Pic.Serm.; Polypodium simplicissimum F.Muell.; Polypodium simplicissimum var. normale Domin; Pleopeltis lanceola F.M.Bailey; Polypodium lanceola F.Muell.; Polypodium simplicissimum var. wurunuran Domin

= Selliguea simplicissima =

Species of fern

Selliguea simplicissima is a species of fern in the family Polypodiaceae. It is native to the Wet Tropics bioregion of Queensland, Australia.

== Description ==
Selliguea simplicissima is a small fern with a long-creeping rhizome which has a dense covering of brown scales. The fronds are variable, generally linear to ovate and reaching 15 to 25 cm (6 to 10 in) in length. They are attached to the rhizome by a short phyllopodium and a stipe up to 9 cm (3.5 in) long. The lateral venation is conspicuous, the frond margins are irregular. The sori are circular and brown, and occur singly between the lateral veins on either side of the midrib.

== Distribution and habitat ==
This fern is endemic to northeastern Queensland, occurring from near Townsville to the area around Cooktown, mostly at altitude. It inhabits rainforest, and is most often seen growing on branches or trunks of trees as an epiphyte, but it will also grow on cliffs and boulders in protected areas.

== Conservation status ==
This species is listed as least concern under the Queensland Government's Nature Conservation Act. As of 9 July 2026, it has not been assessed by the International Union for Conservation of Nature.

== Gallery ==
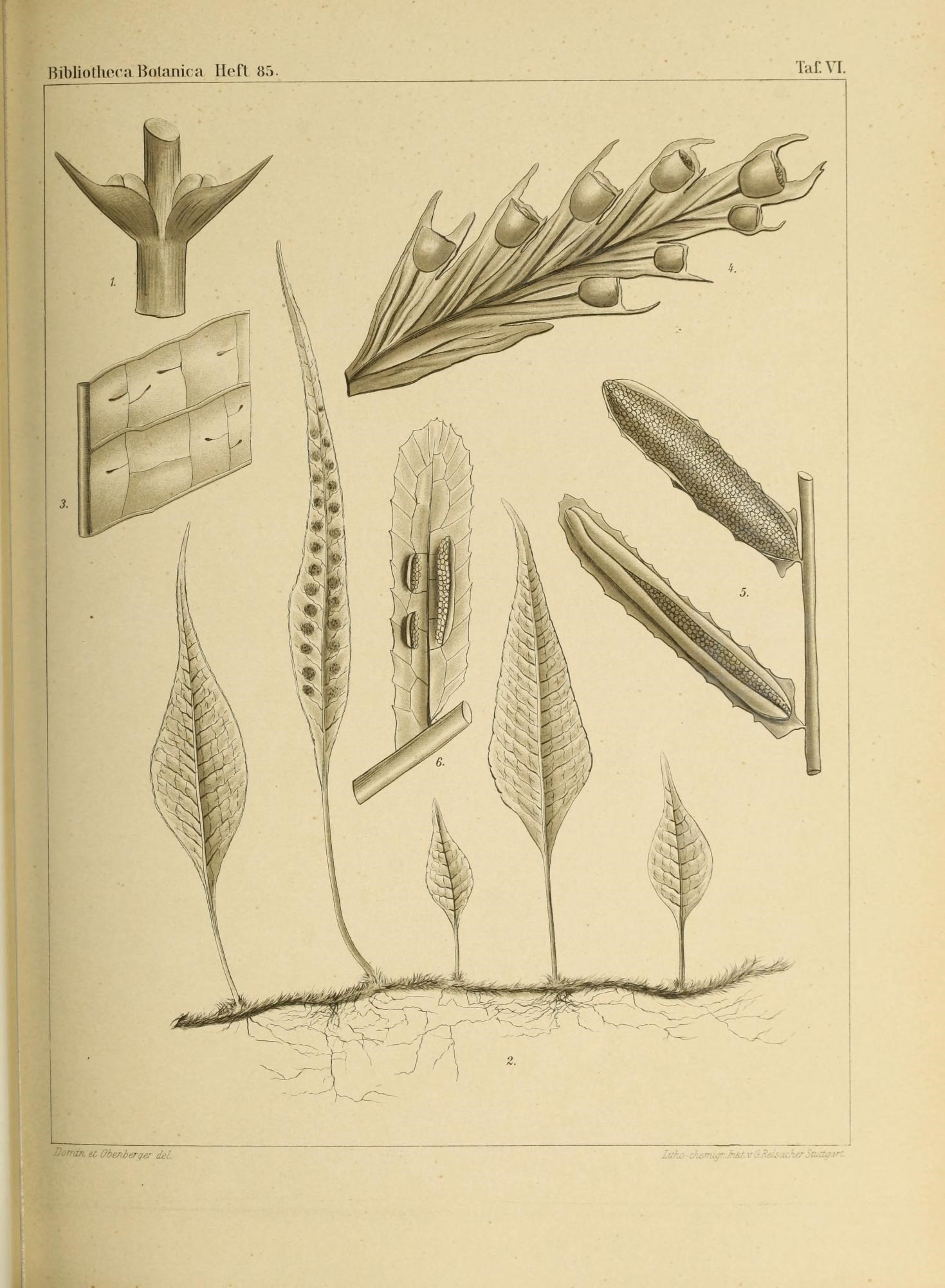
Sketch from Bibliotheca Botanica by Karel Domin

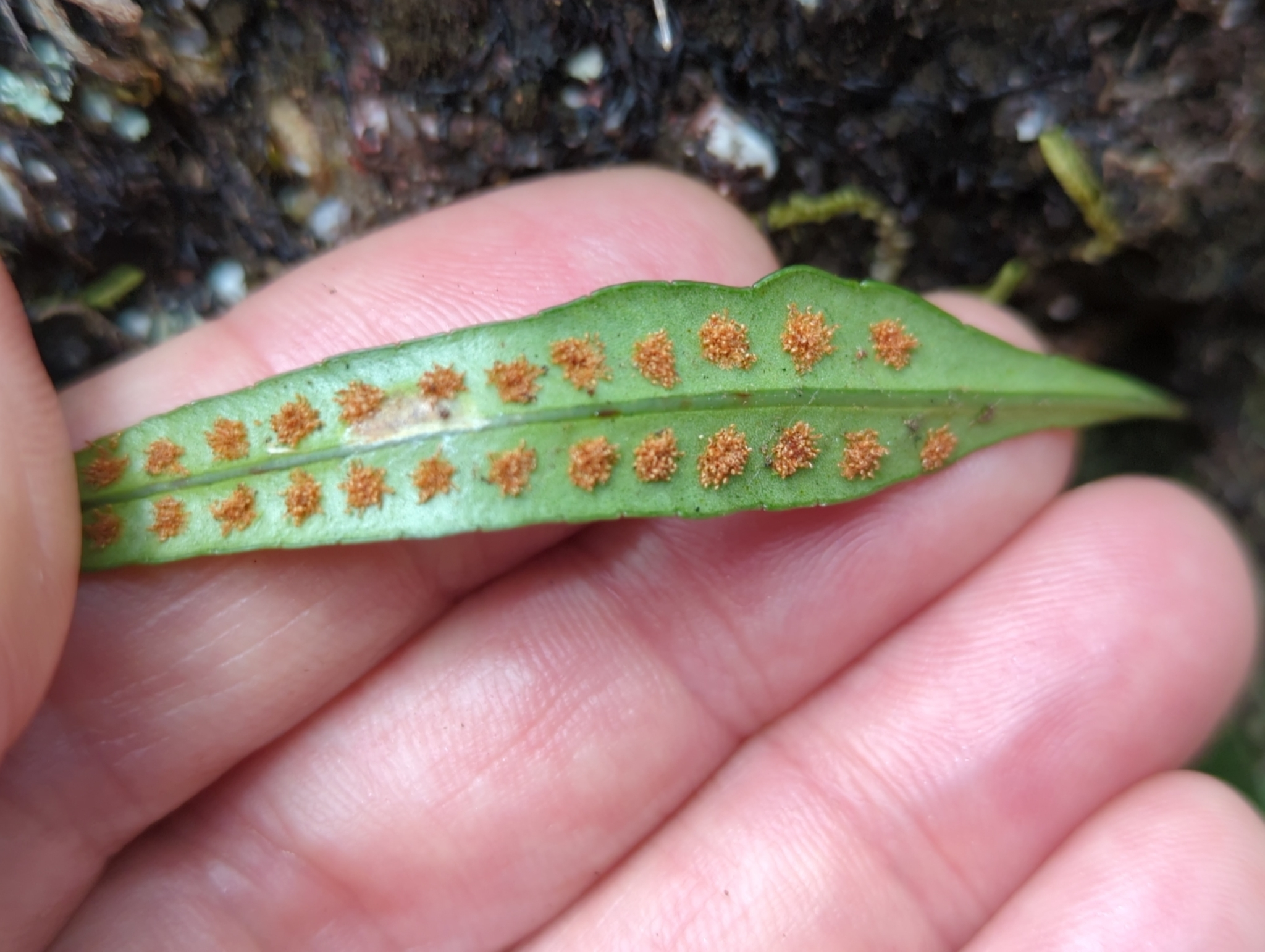
Underside of frond with sori

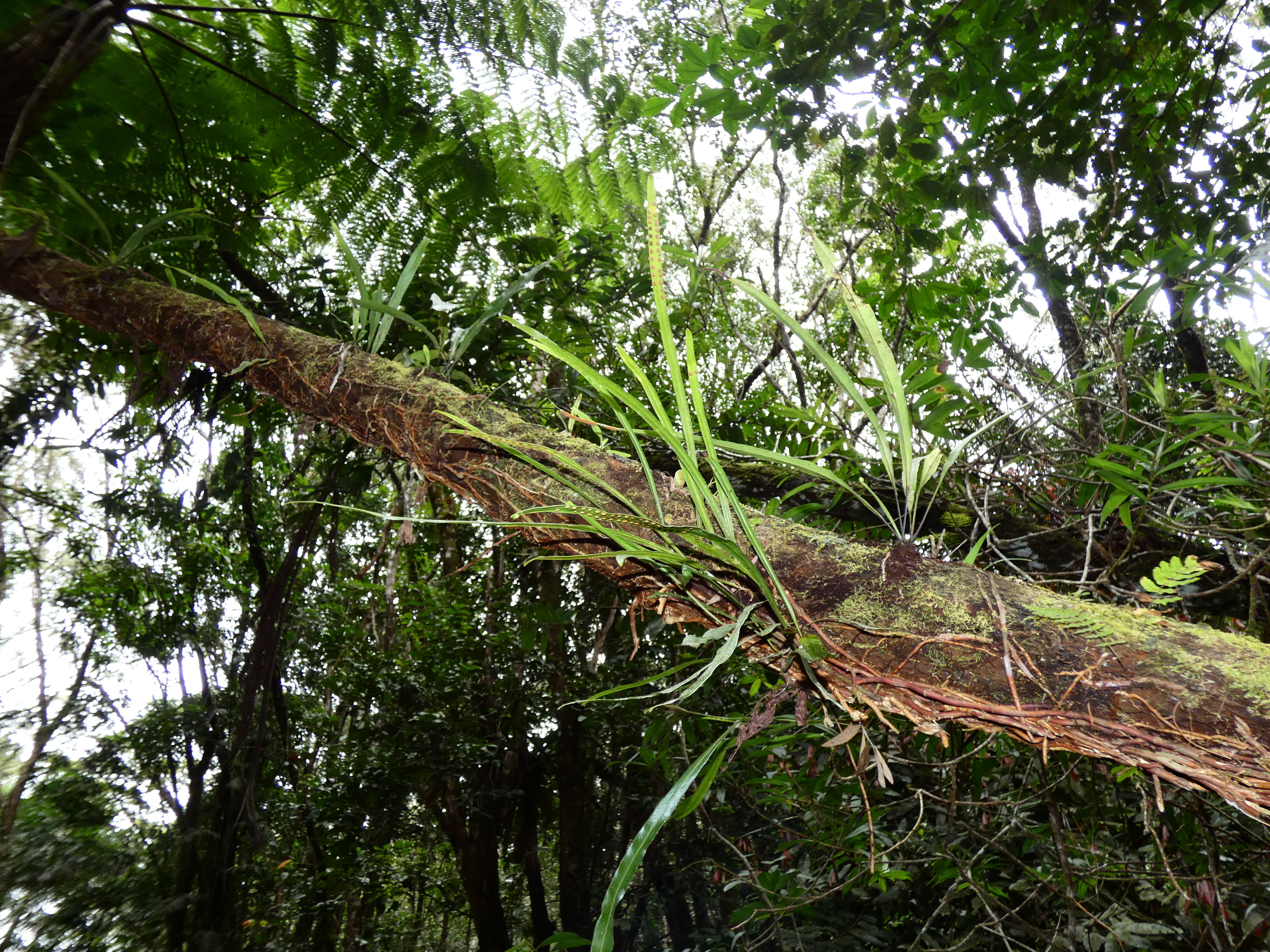
In Dindin National Park

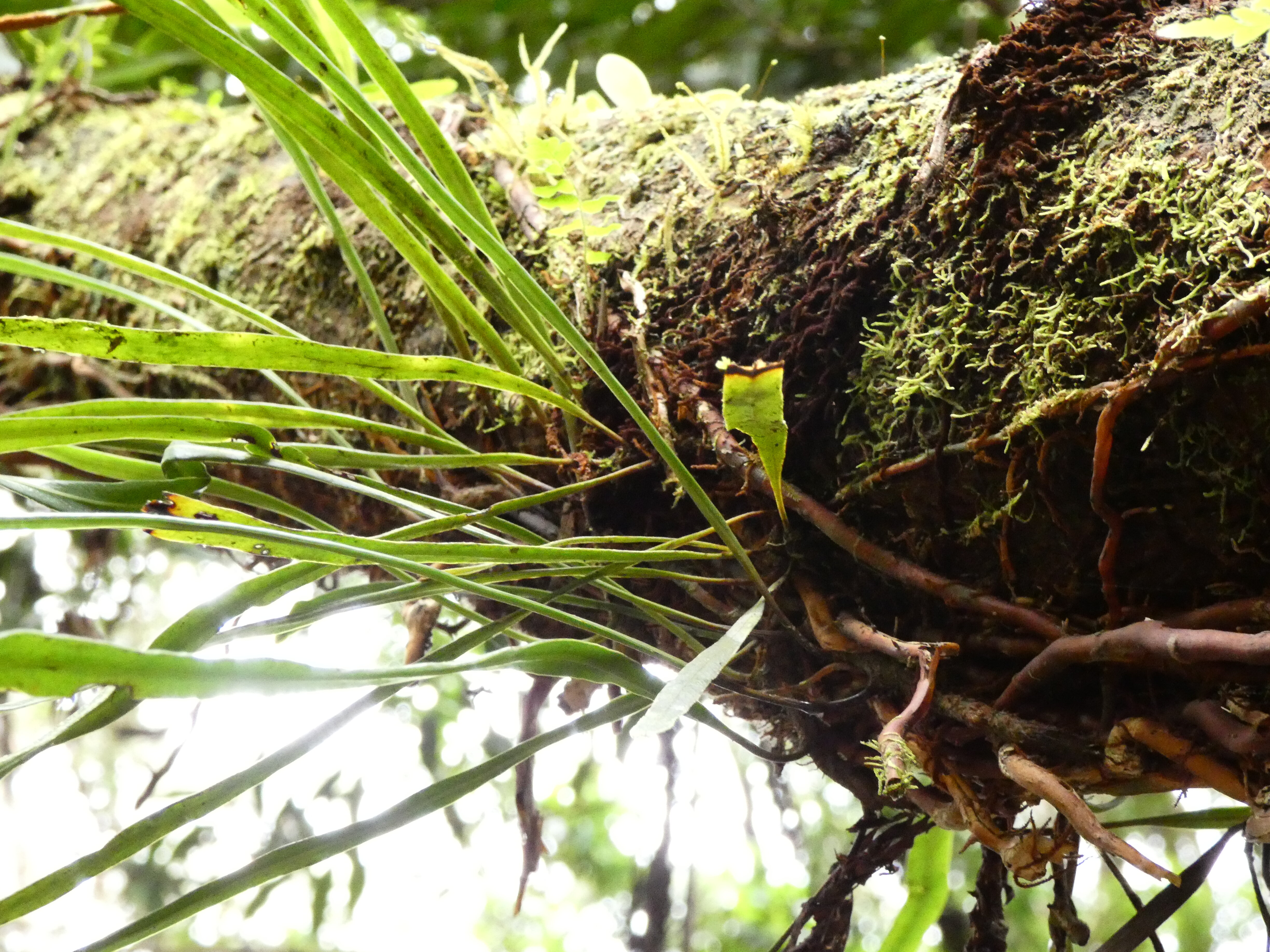
In Dindin National Park

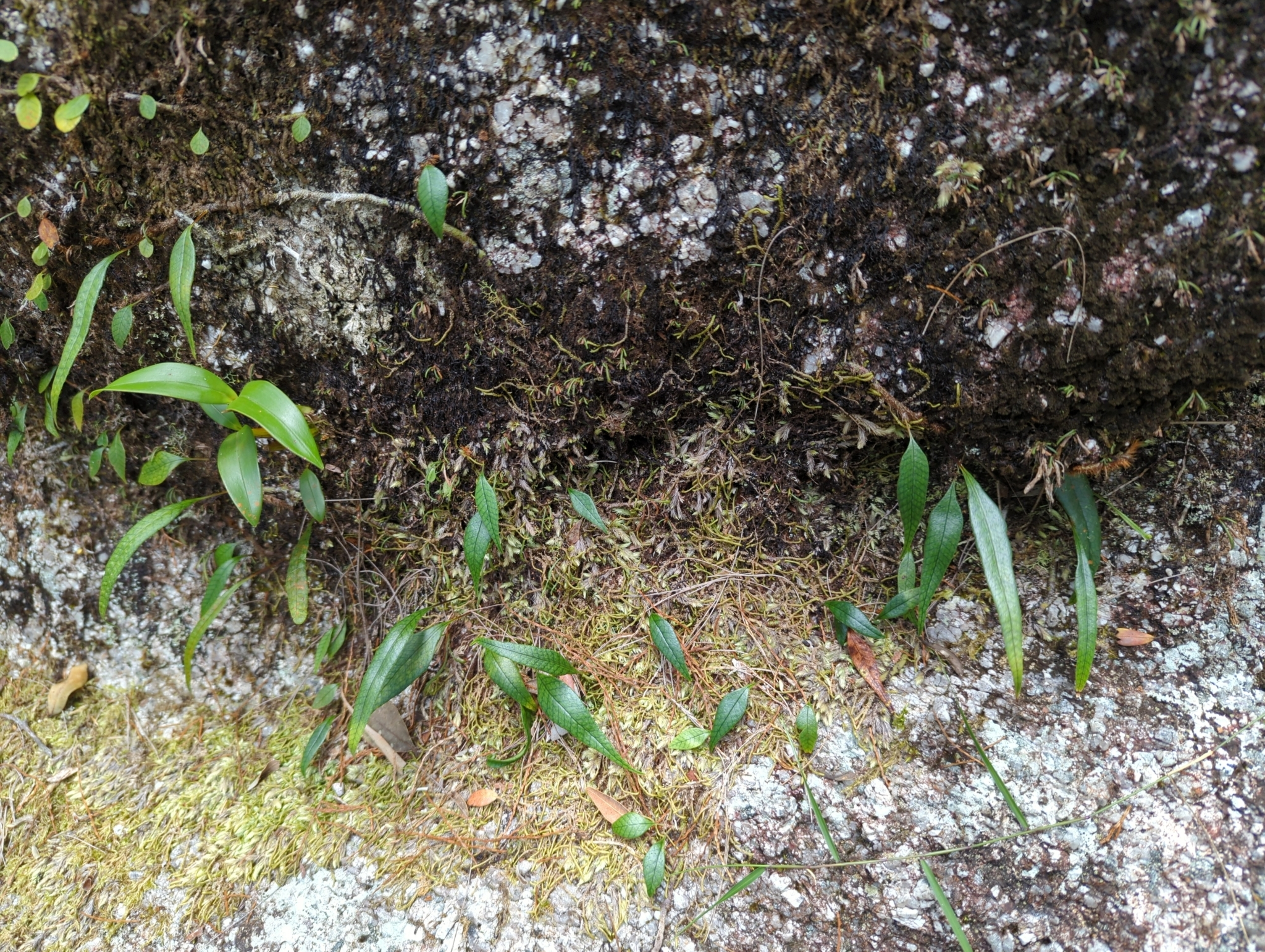
On Mount Bellenden Ker
