= Kaempferol 3-O-rutinoside =

Names
- IUPAC name 7-[(2S,3R,4S,5S,6R)-4,5-Dihydroxy-6-(hydroxymethyl)-3-[(2S,3R,4R,5R,6S)-3,4,5-trihydroxy-6-methyloxan-2-yl]oxyoxan-2-yl]oxy-3,5-dihydroxy-2-(4-hydroxyphenyl)chromen-4-one
- Other names Kaempferol 3-O-rutinoside; Kaempferol 3-O-rhamnosyl-glucoside; Nicotiflorin; Kaempferol-3-O-β-D-glucopyranoside-7-O-α-L-rhamnopyranoside; Kaempferol 7-neohesperidoside

Identifiers
CAS Number	31921-42-3; 31921-42-3; 17650-84-9
3D model (JSmol)	Interactive image
ChEBI	CHEBI:69657
ChemSpider	4477257
ECHA InfoCard	100.211.421
EC Number	241-377-3
KEGG	C21833
PubChem CID	5318767; 5483905
UNII	4056D20K3H
CompTox Dashboard (EPA)	DTXSID50938804
- InChI: InChI=1S/C27H30O15/c1-9-17(31)20(34)22(36)26(39-9)38-8-15-18(32)21(35)23(37)27(41-15)42-25-19(33)16-13(30)6-12(29)7-14(16)40-24(25)10-2-4-11(28)5-3-10/h2-7,9,15,17-18,20-23,26-32,34-37H,8H2,1H3/t9-,15+,17-,18+,20+,21-,22+,23+,26+,27-/m0/s1 Key: RTATXGUCZHCSNG-QHWHWDPRSA-N; InChI=1/C27H30O15/c1-9-17(31)20(34)22(36)26(39-9)38-8-15-18(32)21(35)23(37)27(41-15)42-25-19(33)16-13(30)6-12(29)7-14(16)40-24(25)10-2-4-11(28)5-3-10/h2-7,9,15,17-18,20-23,26-32,34-37H,8H2,1H3/t9-,15+,17-,18+,20+,21-,22+,23+,26+,27-/m0/s1 Key: RTATXGUCZHCSNG-QHWHWDPRBU
- SMILES: C[C@H]1[C@@H]([C@H]([C@H]([C@@H](O1)OC[C@@H]2[C@H]([C@@H]([C@H]([C@@H](O2)Oc3c(=O)c4c(cc(cc4oc3c5ccc(cc5)O)O)O)O)O)O)O)O)O

Properties
Chemical formula	C_{27}H_{30}O_{15}
Molar mass	594.52 g/mol
Density	1.762 g/mL
- Except where otherwise noted, data are given for materials in their standard state (at 25 °C [77 °F], 100 kPa). Infobox references

Kaempferol-3-O-rutinoside is a bitter-tasting flavonol glycoside. It can be isolated from the rhizomes of the fern Selliguea feei.
