= Gymnogrammitis =

Scientific classification
- Kingdom: Plantae
- Clade: Tracheophytes
- Division: Polypodiophyta
- Class: Polypodiopsida
- Order: Polypodiales
- Suborder: Polypodiineae
- Family: Polypodiaceae
- Subfamily: Drynarioideae
- Genus: Gymnogrammitis; Griff.
- Species: G. dareiformis

Binomial name
- Gymnogrammitis dareiformis (Hook.) Ching ex Tardieu & C.Chr.

Synonyms
- Acrophorus hookeri Bedd.; Acrophorus multidentatus Bedd.; Araiostegia dareiformis (Hook.) Copel.; Davallia dareiformis (Hook.) Levinge ex C.B.Clarke; Leucostegia dareiformis (Hook.) Bedd.; Polypodium dareiformioides Ching; Polypodium dareiformis Hook.; Selliguea dareiformis (Hook.) X.C.Zhang & L.J.He

Genus of ferns

Gymnogrammitis is a genus of ferns in the subfamily Drynarioideae of the family Polypodiaceae according to the Pteridophyte Phylogeny Group classification of 2016 (PPG I), with a single species Gymnogrammitis dareiformis.

== Taxonomy ==
The genus Gymnogrammitis was first erected by William Griffith in 1849. The only accepted species is Gymnogrammitis dareiformis, transferred from Polypodium dareiforme. In the Pteridophyte Phylogeny Group classification of 2016 (PPG I), the genus is placed in the family Polypodiaceae, subfamily Drynarioideae. Other sources place Gymnogrammitis dareiformis in a more broadly circumscribed genus Selliguea as Selliguea dareiformis.
