= Paraselliguea =

Scientific classification
- Kingdom: Plantae
- Clade: Tracheophytes
- Division: Polypodiophyta
- Class: Polypodiopsida
- Order: Polypodiales
- Suborder: Polypodiineae
- Family: Polypodiaceae
- Subfamily: Drynarioideae
- Genus: Paraselliguea; Hovenkamp
- Species: P. leucophora

Binomial name
- Paraselliguea leucophora (Baker) Hovenkamp

Synonyms
- Pleopeltis leucophora (Baker) Alderw.; Polypodium leucophorum Baker; Polypodium melanocaulon Alderw.; Selliguea leucophora (Baker) Christenh.

Species of plant

Paraselliguea is a genus of ferns in the subfamily Drynarioideae of the family Polypodiaceae according to the Pteridophyte Phylogeny Group classification of 2016 (PPG I), with a single species Paraselliguea leucophora.

== Taxonomy ==
The genus Paraselliguea was first erected by Peter Hans Hovenkamp in 2000 for the species Polypodium leucophorum. In the Pteridophyte Phylogeny Group classification of 2016 (PPG I), the genus is placed in the family Polypodiaceae, subfamily Drynarioideae. Other sources place Paraselliguea leucophora in a more broadly circumscribed genus Selliguea as Selliguea leucophora.
