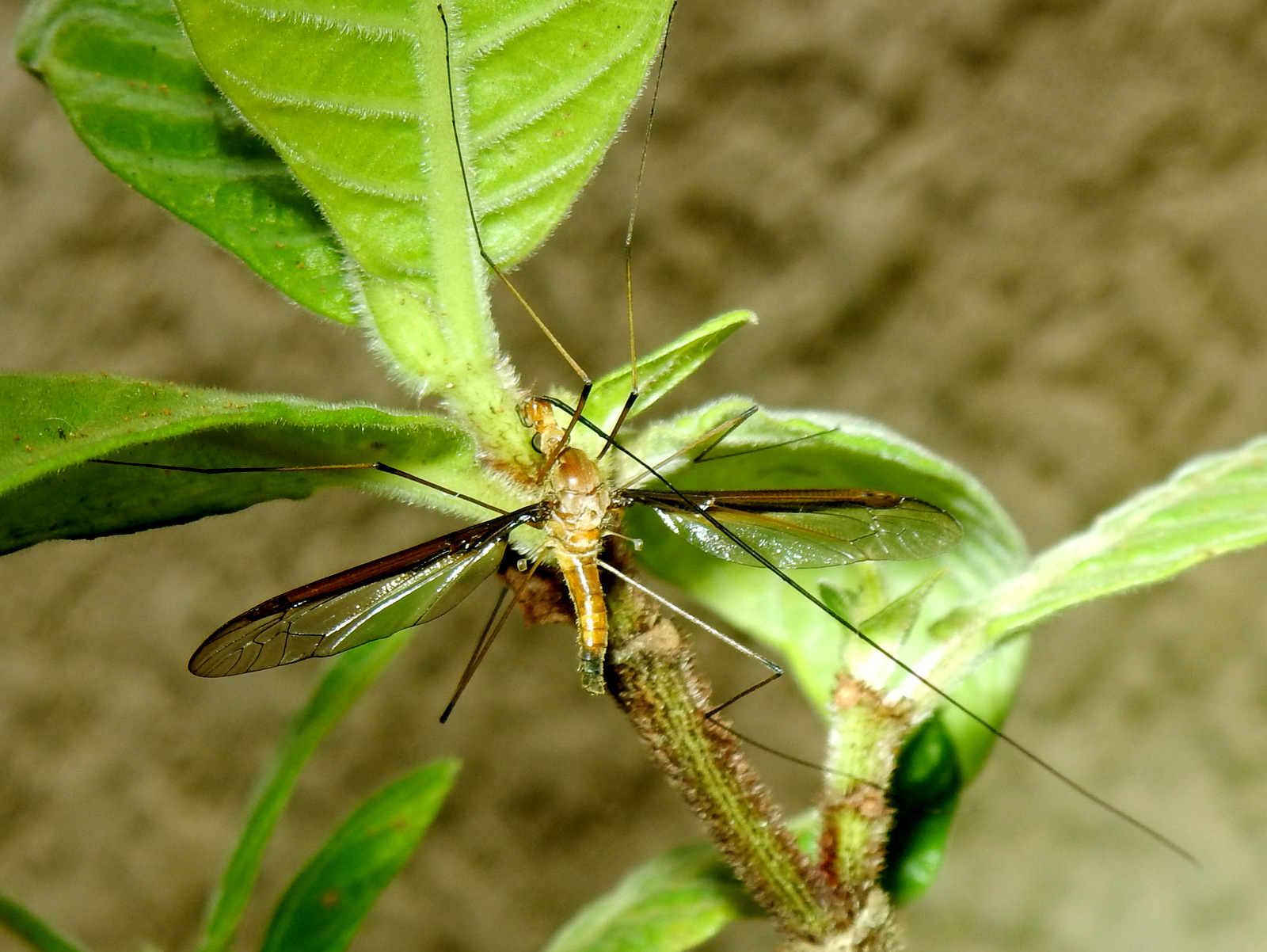

Scientific classification
- Kingdom: Animalia
- Phylum: Arthropoda
- Clade: Pancrustacea
- Class: Insecta
- Order: Diptera
- Family: Tipulidae
- Genus: Leptotarsus
- Species: L. costalis

Binomial name
- Leptotarsus costalis Swederus 1787

Synonyms
- Leptotarsus (Macromastix) costalis (Swederus, 1787); Tipula costata Swederus, 1787; Macromastix macquartianus Alexander, 1924; Leptotarsus macquartianus (Alexander, 1924); Megistocera pacifica Erichson, 1842; Leptotarsus pacificus Erichson, 1842; Leptotarsus (Macromastix) pacificus (Erichson, 1842)

= Leptotarsus costalis =

common brown crane fly

Species of fly

Leptotarsus costalis is an Australian species of crane fly in the family Tipulidae. A large insect with a narrow body and small head. The two wings are held almost at right angles to the body. Legs and antennae are long. The rostrum is as long as the head. Body length to 1.5 cm.
