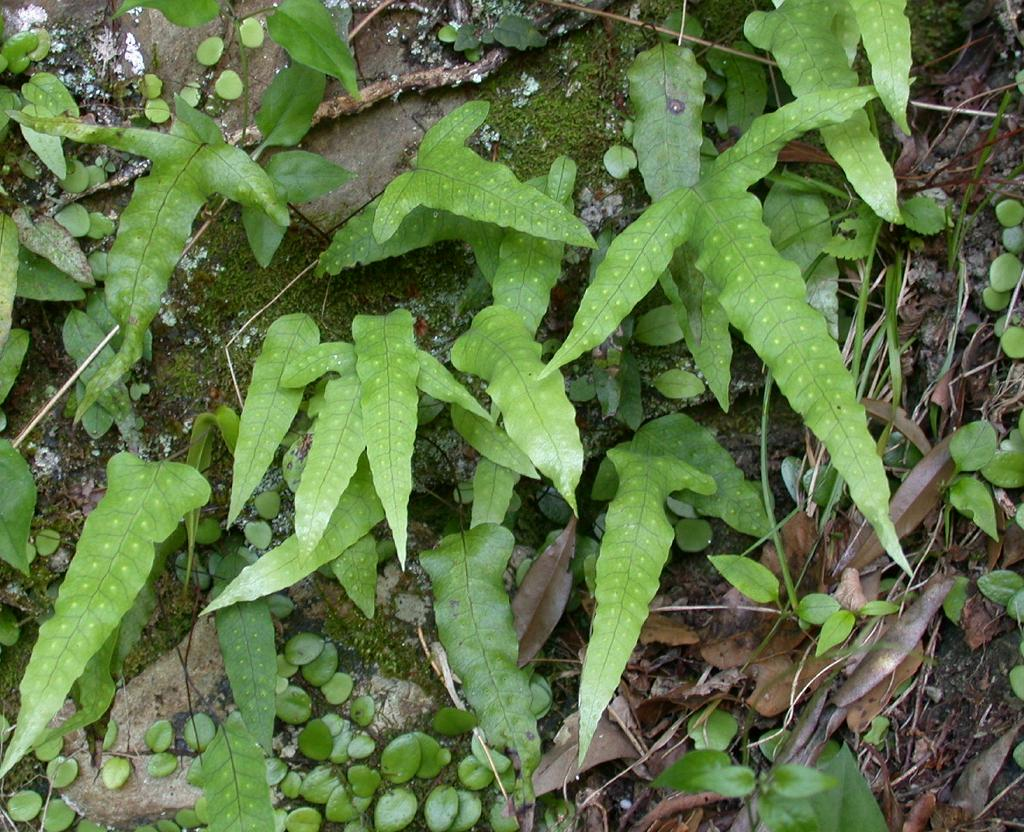

Scientific classification
- Kingdom: Plantae
- Clade: Tracheophytes
- Division: Polypodiophyta
- Class: Polypodiopsida
- Order: Polypodiales
- Suborder: Polypodiineae
- Family: Polypodiaceae
- Genus: Selliguea
- Species: S. hastata

Binomial name
- Selliguea hastata (Thunb.) H. Ohashi and K. Ohashi, comb. nov.

Varieties
- Selliguea hastata var. longisquamata (Tagawa) H. Ohashi & K. Ohashi, comb. nov.

Synonyms
- Crypsinus hastatus Selliguea hastatus (Thunb.) [nom. invalid]

= Selliguea hastata =

Species of fern

Selliguea hastata is a fern species in the genus Selliguea. It is a rhizome-forming lithophyte or epiphyte native to east Asia, ranging from China to Japan and Philippines.
