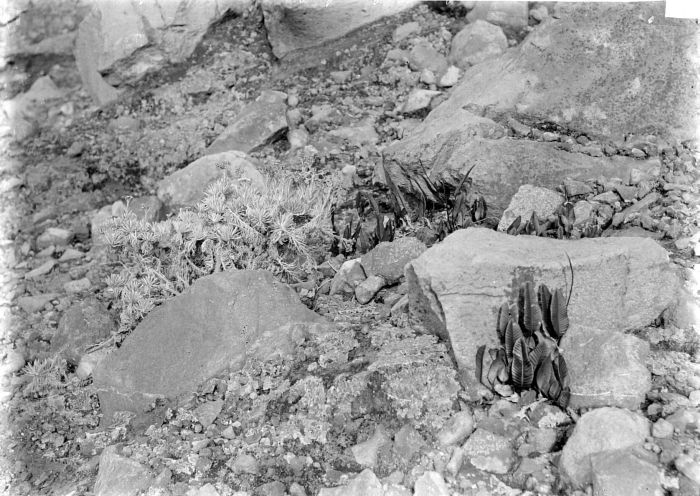

Scientific classification
- Kingdom: Plantae
- Clade: Tracheophytes
- Division: Polypodiophyta
- Class: Polypodiopsida
- Order: Polypodiales
- Suborder: Polypodiineae
- Family: Polypodiaceae
- Genus: Selliguea
- Species: S. feei

Binomial name
- Selliguea feei Bory, Dict. class. 6: 588 (1824)

Synonyms
- Polypodium vulcanucum

= Selliguea feei =

Species of fern

Selliguea feei is a fern belonging to the genus Selliguea in the family Polypodiaceae. This fern can be collected in Indonesia. The species name feei commemorates the botanist Antoine Laurent Apollinaire Fée.

== Biochemistry ==
Selligueain A is an A type proanthocyanidin trimer and a sweetener that can be extracted from the rhizome of the plant.

Kaempferol-3-O-β-D-glucopyranoside-7-O-α-L-rhamnopyranoside, a known bitter-tasting flavonoid glycoside, (-)-4β-carboxymethyl epiafzelechin (3'-deoxydryopteric acid), epiafzelechin-(4β→8, 2β→O→7)-epiafzelechin-(4β→8)-3'-deoxydryopteric acid methyl ester (selligueain B), and (+)-afzelechin-O-β-4'-D-glucopyranoside were also isolated from the rhizomes of Selliguea feei.
