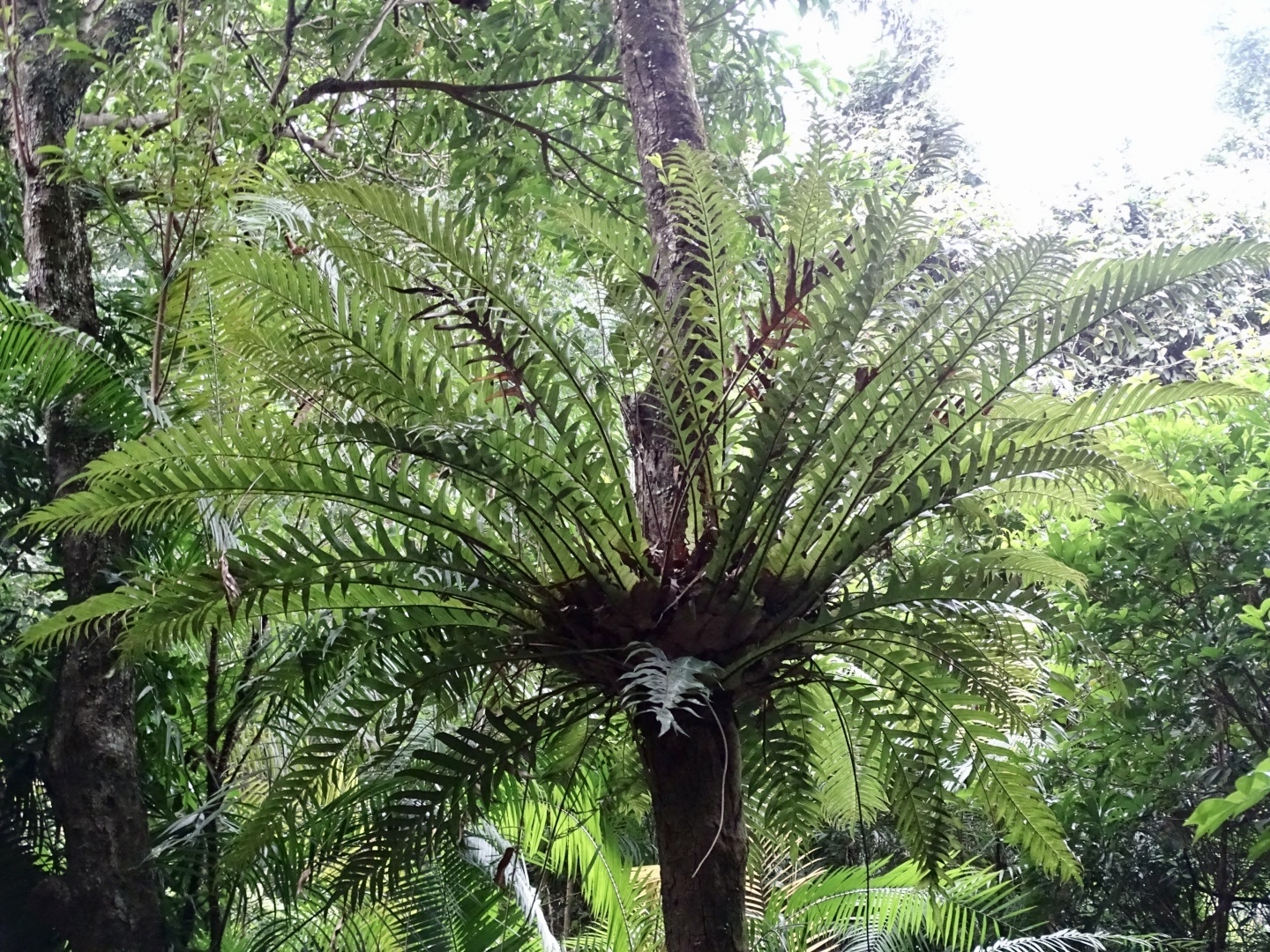
- Drynaria coronans

Scientific classification
- Kingdom: Plantae
- Clade: Tracheophytes
- Division: Polypodiophyta
- Class: Polypodiopsida
- Order: Polypodiales
- Suborder: Polypodiineae
- Family: Polypodiaceae
- Subfamily: Drynarioideae; Crabbe, Jermy & Mickel 1975

Genera
- See text.

= Drynarioideae =

Subfamily of ferns

Drynarioideae is a subfamily of the fern family Polypodiaceae in the Pteridophyte Phylogeny Group classification of 2016 (PPG I). The subfamily is also treated as the tribe Drynarieae within a very broadly defined family Polypodiaceae sensu lato. In either case, it includes the previously separated tribe Selligueeae.

Drynarioideae combines the drynarioid and selligueoid ferns, which have been considered to be tribes (Drynarieae and Selligueeae) when the family Polypodiaceae was very broadly circumscribed. The genus count of neither of original tribes was certain, but the combined total could be at least nine. The Pteridophyte Phylogeny Group classification of 2016 (PPG I) recognizes six genera. Other sources accept fewer. As of February 2020, the Checklist of Ferns and Lycophytes of the World (CFLW) sank Arthromeris, Paraselliguea and Polypodiopteris into a more broadly circumscribed Selliguea. Plants of the World Online in addition placed the sole species of Gymnogrammitis in Selliguea, and recognized Drynaria rather than Aglaomorpha. The table below summarizes these approaches.

Alternative divisions as of February 2020
PPG I	CFLW version 8.20	Plants of the World Online
Aglaomorpha Schott, including Drynaria J.Sm.	Aglaomorpha	Drynaria
Gymnogrammitis Griff.	Gymnogrammitis	Selliguea
Arthromeris (T.Moore) J.Sm.	Selliguea	Selliguea
Paraselliguea Hovenkamp	Selliguea	Selliguea
Polypodiopteris C.F.Reed	Selliguea	Selliguea
Selliguea Bory	Selliguea	Selliguea
