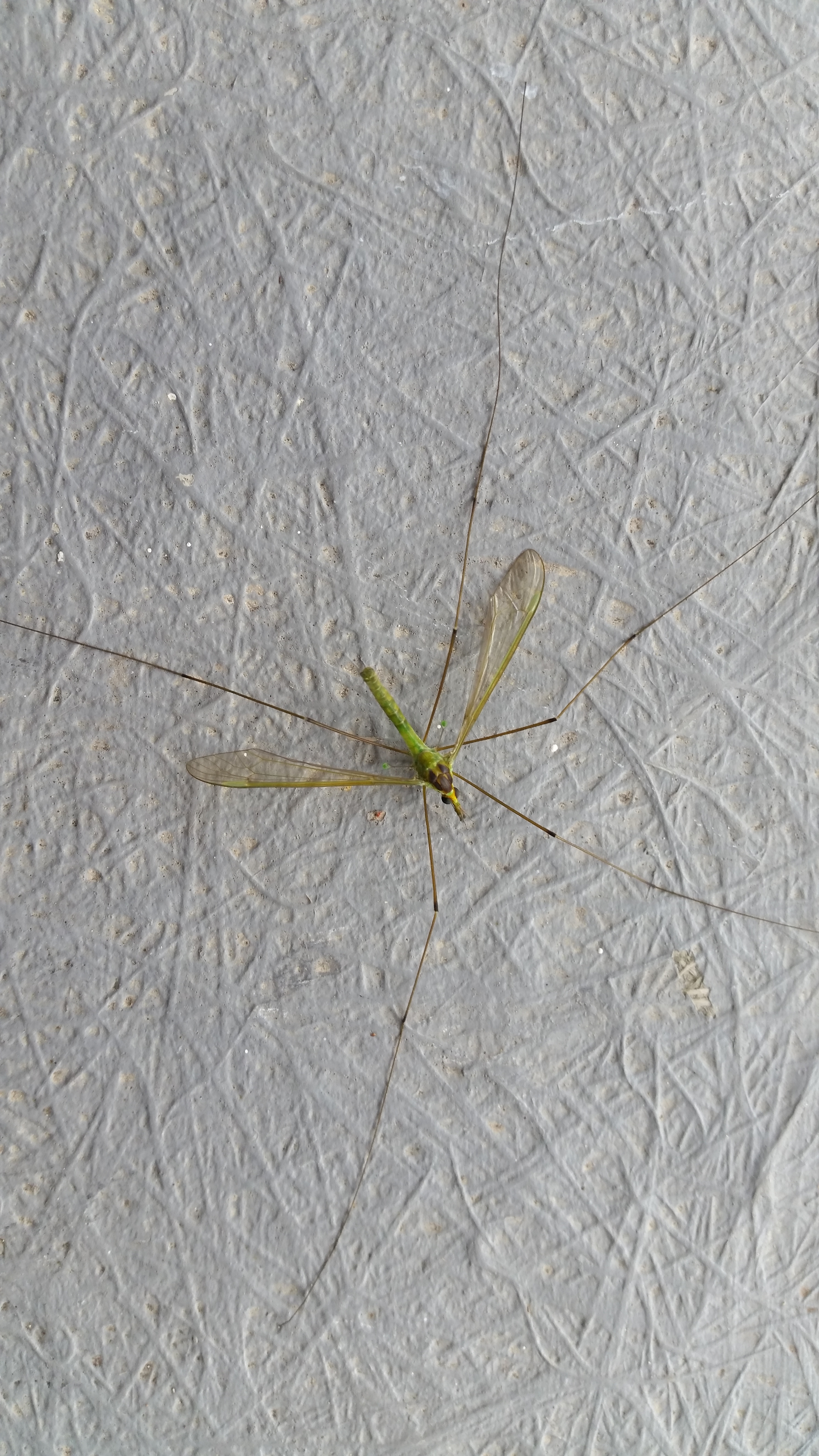
- Leptotarsus viridis

Scientific classification
- Kingdom: Animalia
- Phylum: Arthropoda
- Clade: Pancrustacea
- Class: Insecta
- Order: Diptera
- Family: Tipulidae
- Subfamily: Tipulinae
- Genus: Leptotarsus; Guerin-Meneville, 1831

Type species
- Leptotarsus macquartii Guerin-Meneville, 1831

Subgenus
- Aldrovandia Enderlein, 1912; Araucomyia Alexander, 1929; Aurotipula Alexander, 1924; Brevicera Miller, 1945; Ceoneura Alexander, 1924; Chlorotipula Alexander, 1924; Habromastix Skuse, 1890; Leptotarsus Guerin-Meneville, 1831; Leptotipula Alexander, 1917; Limoniodes Alexander, 1938; Longurio Loew, 1869; Macromastix Osten Sacken, 1887; Maoritipula Alexander, 1924; Pehlkea Enderlein, 1912; Phymatopsis Skuse, 1890; Pseudoleptotarsus Alexander, 1920; Tanypremna Osten Sacken, 1886; Tanypremnella Alexander, 1938; Tanypremnodes Alexander, 1924; Xenotipula Alexander, 1921

Synonyms
- Semnotes Westwood, 1876

= Leptotarsus =

Genus of flies

Leptotarsus is a genus of true crane fly.

== Species ==
- Subgenus Aldrovandia Enderlein, 1912

- L. gesneri (Enderlein, 1912)

- Subgenus Araucomyia Alexander, 1929

- L. brevihirsutus (Alexander, 1934)
- L. paulseni (Philippi, 1866)
- L. penitus (Alexander, 1944)

- Subgenus Aurotipula Alexander, 1924

- L. apertus (Edwards, 1923)
- L. atroflavus (Alexander, 1922)
- L. auroatrus (Edwards, 1923)
- L. bivittatus (Edwards, 1923)
- L. brevitarsis (Edwards, 1923)
- L. clarus (Kirby, 1884)
- L. dux (Kirby, 1884)
- L. ferruginosus (Edwards, 1923)
- L. flavoscapus (Alexander, 1922)
- L. neali Oosterbroek, 1989
- L. occlusus (Edwards, 1924)
- L. orion (Hudson, 1895)
- L. subtener (Alexander, 1922)

- Subgenus Brevicera Miller, 1945

- L. aenigmaticus (Alexander, 1926)
- L. heterogamus (Hudson, 1913)
- L. waitakerensis (Alexander, 1952)

- Subgenus Ceoneura Alexander, 1924

- L. idioneura (Alexander, 1924)

- Subgenus Chlorotipula Alexander, 1924

- L. albistigma (Edwards, 1923)
- L. elongatus (Edwards, 1923)
- L. holochlorus angustior (Alexander, 1923)
- L. holochlorus holochlorus (Nowicki, 1875)
- L. virescens (Edwards, 1923)
- L. viridis (Walker, 1856)

- Subgenus Habromastix Skuse, 1890

- L. bulburinensis Dobrotworsky, 1974
- L. cinerascens (Skuse, 1890)
- L. cunninghamensis Dobrotworsky, 1974
- L. heroni (Alexander, 1922)
- L. hilli (Alexander, 1922)
- L. luciae (Alexander, 1948)
- L. novellus (Alexander, 1928)
- L. ornatipes (Skuse, 1890)
- L. parallelus (Alexander, 1920)
- L. pergrandis (Alexander, 1922)
- L. remotus (Walker, 1848)
- L. similior (Alexander, 1923)
- L. terraereginae (Alexander, 1920)

- Subgenus Leptotarsus Guerin-Meneville, 1831

- L. annulipes (Philippi, 1866)
- L. ardrossanensis Dobrotworsky, 1972
- L. clavatus (Macquart, 1850)
- L. coolgardiensis Dobrotworsky, 1972
- L. ducalis (Westwood, 1876)
- L. esperanceiensis Dobrotworsky, 1972
- L. fletcherensis Dobrotworsky, 1972
- L. fraucai Dobrotworsky, 1972
- L. imperatorius (Westwood, 1876)
- L. kalamundaensis Dobrotworsky, 1972
- L. macquartii Guerin-Meneville, 1831
- L. regificus (Alexander, 1922)
- L. scutellaris Skuse, 1890
- L. subapterus Alexander, 1978
- L. tricinctus (Walker, 1848)
- L. trivittatus Skuse, 1890

- Subgenus Leptotipula Alexander, 1917

- L. edwardsianus (Alexander, 1920)
- L. limnophiloides (Alexander, 1917)

- Subgenus Limoniodes Alexander, 1938

- L. sulphurellus (Alexander, 1938)

- Subgenus Longurio Loew, 1869

- L. africanus (Alexander, 1921)
- L. albicubitalis (Alexander, 1964)
- L. anoplostylus (Alexander, 1964)
- L. aspropodus (Alexander, 1957)
- L. atrirostris (Alexander, 1945)
- L. basuticanus (Alexander, 1956)
- L. belloides (Alexander, 1921)
- L. bertii Alexander, 1979
- L. bonaespei (Bergroth, 1888)
- L. borgmeieranus Alexander, 1969
- L. brasiliae (Alexander, 1935)
- L. browni (Alexander, 1940)
- L. bullocki (Alexander, 1931)
- L. byersi Young and Gelhaus, 1992
- L. caffer (Alexander, 1917)
- L. caparaonus (Alexander, 1944)
- L. capicola (Alexander, 1921)
- L. carreranus (Alexander, 1945)
- L. chaoianus (Alexander, 1949)
- L. chionoides (Alexander, 1917)
- L. chrysostigma (Alexander, 1944)
- L. cinereilinea (Alexander, 1921)
- L. cnephosus (Alexander, 1960)
- L. congestus (Alexander, 1949)
- L. coronatus (Alexander, 1917)
- L. dolichoros (Wood, 1952)
- L. drakensbergensis (Alexander, 1956)
- L. eshowensis (Alexander, 1960)
- L. espinozai (Alexander, 1939)
- L. eucryptus (Alexander, 1953)
- L. exemptus (Alexander, 1936)
- L. flagellatus (Wood, 1952)
- L. fulvus (Edwards, 1916)
- L. ganocephalus (Alexander, 1960)
- L. goyazanus (Alexander, 1940)
- L. guimaraesi (Alexander, 1942)
- L. gurneyi Alexander, 1975
- L. gymnocerus (Alexander, 1938)
- L. hainanensis (Alexander, 1936)
- L. helotus Alexander, 1969
- L. hirsutistylus (Alexander, 1949)
- L. huanucensis (Alexander, 1954)
- L. inaequipes (Alexander, 1956)
- L. insidiosus (Alexander, 1949)
- L. ixion (Alexander, 1949)
- L. jonesi (Alexander, 1920)
- L. lemniscatus (Alexander, 1929)
- L. lustralis (Alexander, 1936)
- L. luteiniger (Alexander, 1963)
- L. luteistigma (Alexander, 1940)
- L. macarius (Alexander, 1963)
- L. melanopterus (Alexander, 1930)
- L. micropteryx (Alexander, 1921)
- L. millotianus (Alexander, 1958)
- L. minimus (Alexander, 1914)
- L. minusculoides (Wood, 1952)
- L. minusculus (Alexander, 1917)
- L. mitiformis (Alexander, 1960)
- L. mossambicensis (Alexander, 1920)
- L. mosselensis (Alexander, 1945)
- L. nahuelbutae (Alexander, 1945)
- L. neorinus (Alexander, 1953)
- L. niphopodus (Alexander, 1956)
- L. nocivus (Alexander, 1953)
- L. paraguayanus (Riedel, 1921)
- L. paraguayensis (Alexander, 1935)
- L. perglabratus (Alexander, 1954)
- L. phaedrus (Alexander, 1949)
- L. piger (Alexander, 1945)
- L. pruinosus (Johnson, 1913)
- L. pulverosus (Matsumura, 1916)
- L. pygmaeus (Alexander, 1914)
- L. quadriniger (Alexander, 1949)
- L. rabelloi (Alexander, 1954)
- L. rhodesiae (Alexander, 1937)
- L. riedelianus (Alexander, 1920)
- L. rivertonensis (Johnson, 1909)
- L. rubriceps (Edwards, 1916)
- L. rubroniger (Alexander, 1921)
- L. serotinellus (Alexander, 1928)
- L. sessoris (Alexander, 1954)
- L. silvester (Wood, 1952)
- L. spinosus (Wood, 1952)
- L. stenodiastema (Alexander, 1961)
- L. stenostylus (Alexander, 1953)
- L. stuckenbergi (Alexander, 1956)
- L. styx (Alexander, 1954)
- L. syndactylus (Alexander, 1956)
- L. testaceus (Loew, 1869)
- L. tijucanus (Alexander, 1943)
- L. tinctorius (Alexander, 1960)
- L. travassosanus (Alexander, 1942)
- L. variceps (Alexander, 1935)
- L. versfeldi (Wood, 1952)
- L. vulsurus (Alexander, 1955)
- L. yanoi Alexander, 1953
- L. zeylanicus (Alexander, 1958)
- L. zikanellus (Alexander, 1954)

- Subgenus Macromastix Osten Sacken, 1887

- L. albicollis (Alexander, 1924)
- L. albipedis Hynes, 1993
- L. albiplagius (Alexander, 1923)
- L. alexanderi (Edwards, 1923)
- L. alfie Theischinger, 1996
- L. amissionis (Alexander, 1952)
- L. angusticosta (Alexander, 1923)
- L. arenarius (Alexander, 1950)
- L. atridorsum (Alexander, 1922)
- L. aurantioceps (Alexander, 1924)
- L. barringtoniensis Dobrotworsky, 1974
- L. binnaburrae (Alexander, 1951)
- L. binotatus (Hutton, 1900)
- L. brisbaneiensis Dobrotworsky, 1974
- L. caledonianus (Alexander, 1934)
- L. campbelli (Alexander, 1923)
- L. cinereus (Edwards, 1923)
- L. clitellarius (Alexander, 1930)
- L. cockerellae (Alexander, 1929)
- L. collessi Dobrotworsky, 1974
- L. constrictus (Skuse, 1890)
- L. costalis (Swederus, 1787)
- L. cubitalis (Edwards, 1923)
- L. decoratus (Edwards, 1923)
- L. dichroithorax (Alexander, 1920)
- L. dispar (Walker, 1835)
- L. dorrigensis (Alexander, 1924)
- L. errans (Edwards, 1927)
- L. fergusoni (Alexander, 1924)
- L. flavidipennis (Alexander, 1923)
- L. fucatus (Hutton, 1900)
- L. fumibasis (Edwards, 1923)
- L. gargettensis Dobrotworsky, 1974
- L. glabristylus Hynes, 1993
- L. glaucocapillus (Alexander, 1952)
- L. greyanus (Alexander, 1922)
- L. hackeri (Alexander, 1920)
- L. halteratus (Alexander, 1923)
- L. helmsi (Skuse, 1890)
- L. hudsonianus (Alexander, 1922)
- L. humilis (Skuse, 1890)
- L. huttoni (Edwards, 1923)
- L. igniceps (Alexander, 1928)
- L. incertus (Edwards, 1923)
- L. intermedius (Alexander, 1922)
- L. longioricornis (Alexander, 1923)
- L. lunatus (Hutton, 1900)
- L. luteicosta (Alexander, 1924)
- L. luteisubcostatus (Alexander, 1934)
- L. mastersi (Skuse, 1890)
- L. mathewsi (Alexander, 1930)
- L. mesocerus (Alexander, 1922)
- L. minor (Edwards, 1923)
- L. minutissimus (Alexander, 1923)
- L. mixtus Hynes, 1993
- L. monstratus (Alexander, 1924)
- L. montanus (Hutton, 1900)
- L. mutabilis (Alexander, 1928)
- L. nigropolitus (Alexander, 1928)
- L. noelianus Alexander, 1978
- L. novocaledonicus (Alexander, 1929)
- L. obliquus (Edwards, 1923)
- L. obscuripennis (Kirby, 1884)
- L. obscurirostris (Skuse, 1890)
- L. ohakunensis (Alexander, 1923)
- L. opifex (Alexander, 1929)
- L. pallidistigma (Alexander, 1922)
- L. pallidus (Hutton, 1900)
- L. pedestris (Alexander, 1939)
- L. pseudoaurantioceps Dobrotworsky, 1974
- L. pseudotortilis Dobrotworsky, 1974
- L. risbeci (Alexander, 1934)
- L. rufibasis (Alexander, 1922)
- L. rufiventris (Edwards, 1923)
- L. sessilis (Alexander, 1924)
- L. setivena (Alexander, 1929)
- L. simillimus (Alexander, 1924)
- L. sinclairi (Edwards, 1923)
- L. spinastylus Hynes, 1993
- L. submancus (Alexander, 1923)
- L. submontanus (Edwards, 1923)
- L. subobsoletus (Alexander, 1926)
- L. subvittatus (Alexander, 1939)
- L. tamborineiensis Dobrotworsky, 1974
- L. tapleyi (Alexander, 1923)
- L. tenuifrons (Alexander, 1926)
- L. tortilis (Alexander, 1920)
- L. variegatus (Edwards, 1923)
- L. verreauxi (Alexander, 1929)
- L. vittatus (Edwards, 1923)
- L. vulpinus (Hutton, 1881)
- L. zeylandiae (Alexander, 1920)

- Subgenus Maoritipula Alexander, 1924

- L. hudsoni (Alexander, 1924)
- L. maori (Alexander, 1920)

- Subgenus Pehlkea Enderlein, 1912

- L. columbianus (Enderlein, 1912)
- L. pallitarsis (Alexander, 1937)
- L. regina (Alexander, 1914)
- L. regulus (Alexander, 1943)

- Subgenus Phymatopsis Skuse, 1890

- L. albidipes (Alexander, 1929)
- L. brevipalpis (Alexander, 1920)
- L. brevirostratus (Alexander, 1922)
- L. flavopygialis (Alexander, 1920)
- L. intricatus (Alexander, 1928)
- L. nigrirostris (Skuse, 1890)
- L. nigrolimbatus (Alexander, 1929)
- L. nigrosubcostatus (Alexander, 1924)
- L. periplocus (Alexander, 1928)
- L. tenuirostris (Alexander, 1924)
- L. tonnoiranus (Alexander, 1928)
- L. walpoleiensis Dobrotworsky, 1974

- Subgenus Pseudoleptotarsus Alexander, 1920

- L. liponeurus Alexander, 1920
- L. nigrinus Dobrotworsky, 1972

- Subgenus Tanypremna Osten Sacken, 1886

- L. albobasalis Alexander, 1969
- L. aurantiothorax (Alexander, 1954)
- L. bezzianus (Alexander, 1921)
- L. borgmeieri (Alexander, 1942)
- L. calliope (Alexander, 1945)
- L. carbonipes (Alexander, 1938)
- L. cerritus (Alexander, 1945)
- L. clotho (Alexander, 1944)
- L. elegantior (Alexander, 1945)
- L. fieldianus (Alexander, 1956)
- L. fuscitarsis (Alexander, 1919)
- L. guadeloupensis Young, 2001
- L. hodgei (Alexander, 1939)
- L. horridus (Alexander, 1941)
- L. incompletus (Alexander, 1944)
- L. invaripes (Alexander, 1936)
- L. kadeni (Alexander, 1941)
- L. longipes (Fabricius, 1805)
- L. longissimus (Enderlein, 1912)
- L. manicatus (Osten Sacken, 1888)
- L. mirandus (Alexander, 1944)
- L. opilio (Osten Sacken, 1886)
- L. ornatipes (Alexander, 1941)
- L. perornatus (Alexander, 1929)
- L. phylax (Alexander, 1954)
- L. picturellus (Alexander, 1941)
- L. porterianus (Alexander, 1937)
- L. proavitus (Alexander, 1940)
- L. salome (Alexander, 1945)
- L. saltatrix (Alexander, 1944)
- L. sanctaecatharinae (Alexander, 1945)
- L. uniguttatus (Alexander, 1954)

- Subgenus Tanypremnella Alexander, 1938

- L. antennifer (Alexander, 1942)
- L. crystallinus (Alexander, 1938)
- L. elongatus Alexander, 1978
- L. gentilis (Alexander, 1943)
- L. maldonadoi (Alexander, 1953)
- L. mediocornis (Alexander, 1944)
- L. megacerus (Alexander, 1943)
- L. microcerus (Alexander, 1943)
- L. perdistinctus (Alexander, 1942)
- L. segnipes (Alexander, 1953)
- L. transfasciatus (Alexander, 1938)

- Subgenus Tanypremnodes Alexander, 1924

- L. leucoplaca (Alexander, 1924)
- L. subapicalis (Alexander, 1941)

- Subgenus Xenotipula Alexander, 1921

- L. cisatlanticus (Alexander, 1937)
- L. munroi (Alexander, 1921)
