= Afzelechin =

- Chemical structure of Afzelechin (2R,3S)

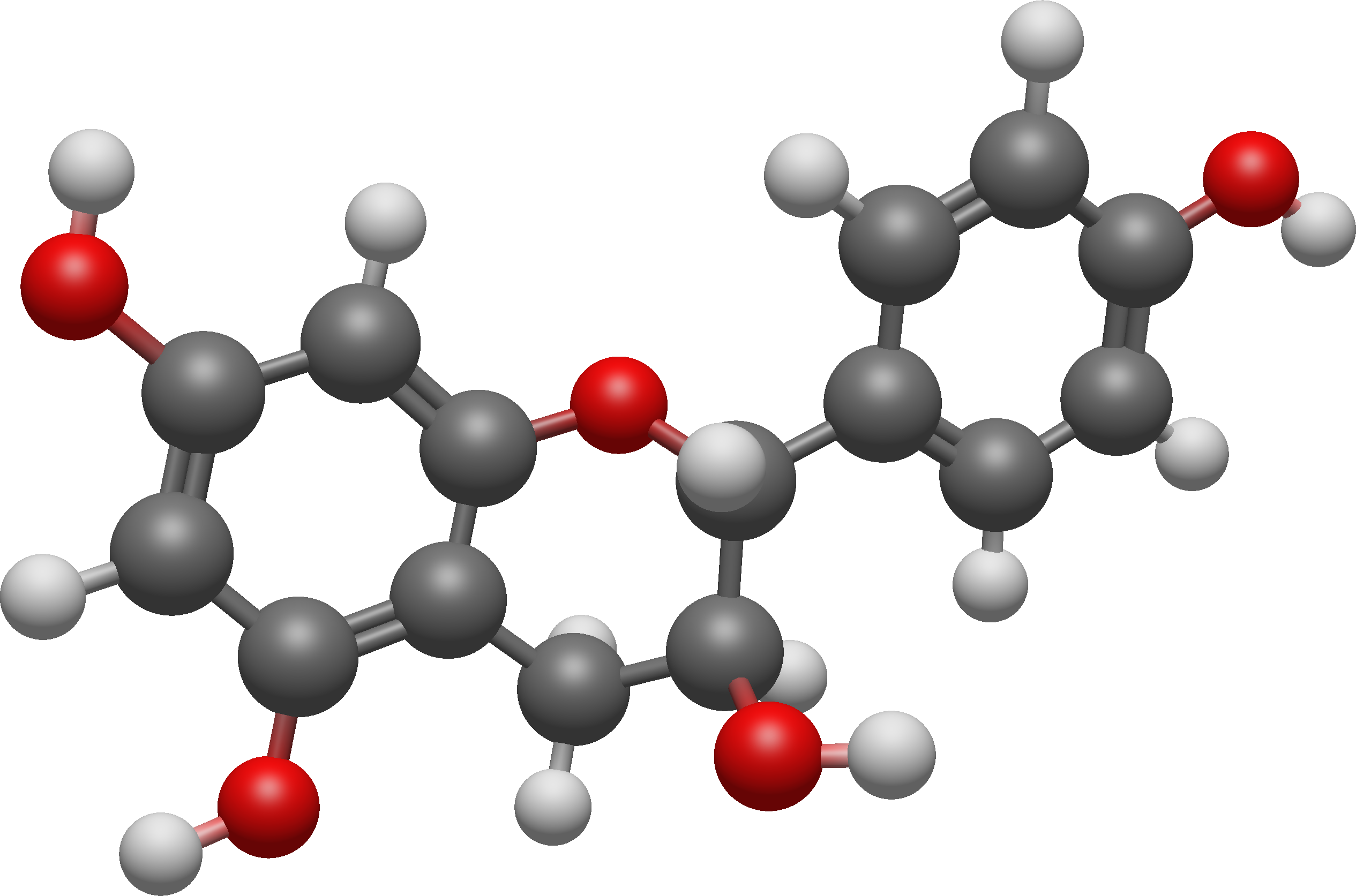
- Chemical structure of Afzelechin (2R,3S) in ball-and-stick format

- Chemical structure of Epiafzelechin (2R,3R)

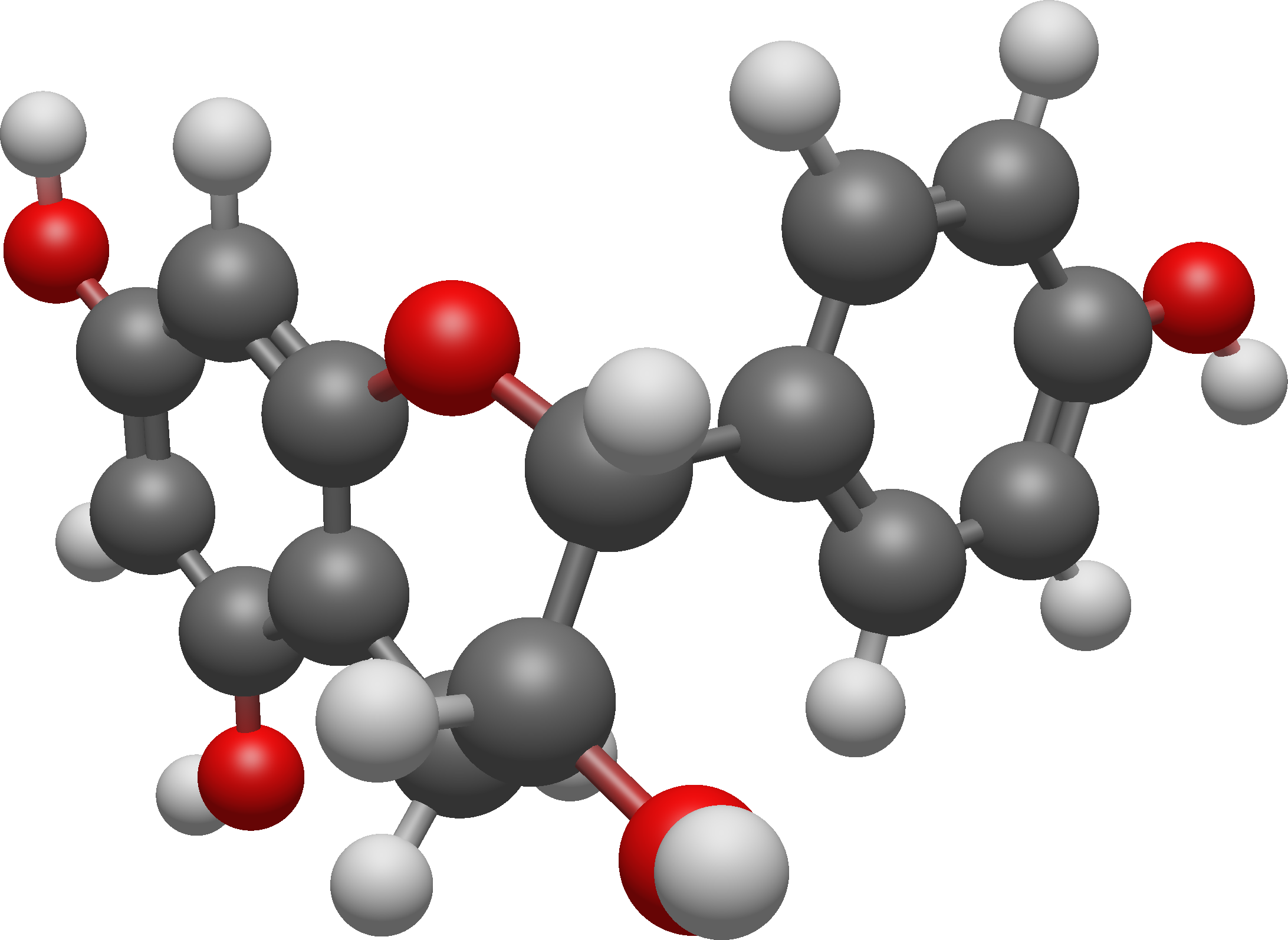
- Chemical structure of Epiafzelechin (2R,3R) in ball-and-stick format

Names
- IUPAC name Afzelechin: (2R,3S)-2-(4-hydroxyphenyl)-3,4-dihydro-2H-chromene-3,5,7-triol; Epiafzelechin: (2R,3R)-2-(4-hydroxyphenyl)-3,4-dihydro-2H-chromene-3,5,7-triol
- Other names 3,5,7,4′-Tetrahydroxyflavan; 3,4′,5,7-Flavantetrol

Identifiers
CAS Number	2545-00-8 (Afzelechin); 24808-04-6 (Epiafzelechin); 490-61-9 (Racemate)
3D model (JSmol)	Interactive image; Interactive image
ChEBI	CHEBI:31028
ChEMBL	ChEMBL159303
ChemSpider	391781
KEGG	C12128
PubChem CID	443639
UNII	W782YDV47U (Afzelechin)
CompTox Dashboard (EPA)	DTXSID60300139
- InChI: InChI=1S/C15H14O5/c16-9-3-1-8(2-4-9)15-13(19)7-11-12(18)5-10(17)6-14(11)20-15/h1-6,13,15-19H,7H2/t13-,15-/m1/s1 Key: RSYUFYQTACJFML-UKRRQHHQSA-N; InChI=1/C15H14O5/c16-9-3-1-8(2-4-9)15-13(19)7-11-12(18)5-10(17)6-14(11)20-15/h1-6,13,15-19H,7H2/t13-,15-/m1/s1 Key: RSYUFYQTACJFML-UKRRQHHQBG
- SMILES: C1C(C(OC2=CC(=CC(=C21)O)O)C3=CC=C(C=C3)O)O; Oc1ccc(cc1)[C@H]3Oc2cc(O)cc(O)c2C[C@H]3O

Properties
Chemical formula	C_{15}H_{14}O_{5}
Molar mass	274.26 g/mol
- Except where otherwise noted, data are given for materials in their standard state (at 25 °C [77 °F], 100 kPa). verify (what is ?) Infobox references

Afzelechin is a flavan-3-ol, a type of flavonoid. It can be found in Bergenia ligulata (a.k.a. paashaanbhed in Ayurveda traditional Indian medicine). It exists as at least two major epimers (afzelechin and epiafzelechin).

== Metabolism ==
(2R,3S)-Catechin:NADP^{+} 4-oxidoreductase transforms cis-3,4-leucopelargonidin into afzelechin.

== Glycosides ==
Arthromerin A (afzelechin-3-O-β-D-xylopyranoside) and arthromerin B (afzelechin-3-O-β-D-glucopyranoside) are afzelechin glycosides isolated from the roots of the fern Arthromeris mairei. (+)-Afzelechin-O-β-4′-D-glucopyranoside can be isolated from the rhizomes of the fern Selliguea feei.

== Proanthocyanidins ==
=== Dimers ===
Afzelechin-(4α→8)-afzelechin (molecular formula C_{30}H_{26}O_{10}, molar mass: 546.52 g/mol, exact mass: 546.152597, CAS number: 101339-37-1, Pubchem CID: 12395) is a B type proanthocyanidin.

ent-Epiafzelechin-3-O-p-hydroxybenzoate-(4α→8,2α→O→7)-epiafzelechin is an A-type proanthocyanidin found in apricots (Prunus armeniaca).

=== Trimers ===
Selligueain A (epiafzelechin-(4β→8,2β→O→7)-epiafzelechin-(4β→8)-afzelechin) is an A type proanthocyanidin.
