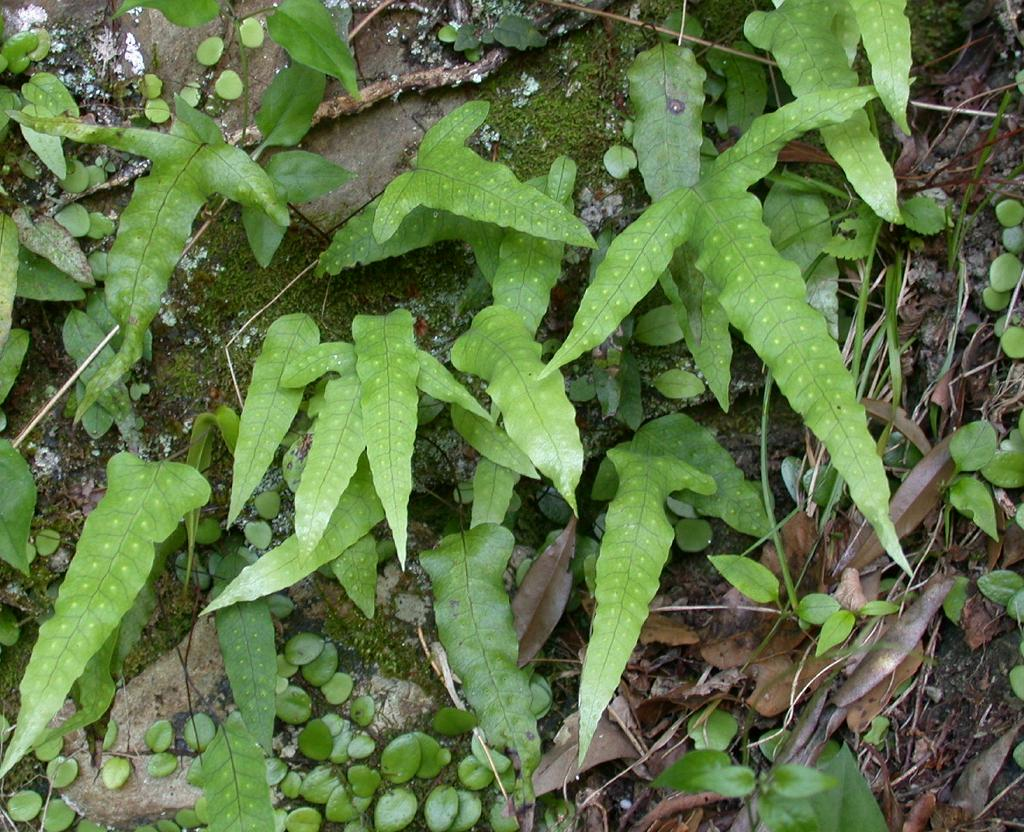
- Selliguea hastata
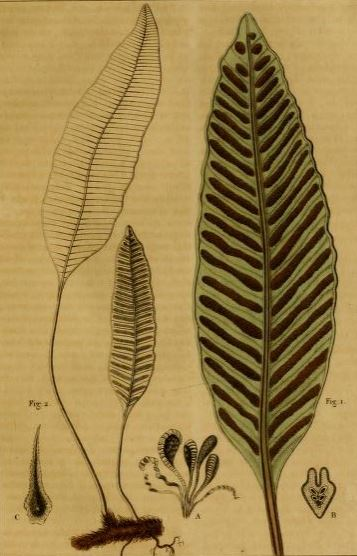
- Selliguea feei

Scientific classification
- Kingdom: Plantae
- Clade: Embryophytes
- Clade: Tracheophytes
- Division: Polypodiophyta
- Class: Polypodiopsida
- Order: Polypodiales
- Suborder: Polypodiineae
- Family: Polypodiaceae
- Subfamily: Drynarioideae
- Genus: Selliguea; Bory

Type species
- Selliguea feei Bory

Species
- See text
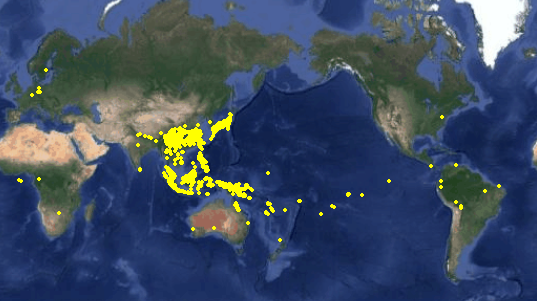
- Occurrence data from GBIF

Synonyms
- 22 synonyms: Arthromeris (T.Moore) J.Sm.; Crypsinopsis Pic.Serm.; Crypsinus C.Presl; Dryostachyum J.Sm.; Grammatopteridium Alderw.; Grammatopteris Alderw.; Gymnogrammitis Griff.; Himalayopteris W.Shao & S.G.Lu; Holcosorus T.Moore; Microterus C.Presl; Oleandropsis Copel.; Paraselliguea Hovenkamp; Phymatopsis J.Sm.; Phymatopteris Pic.Serm.; Pichisermollia Fraser-Jenk.; Pichisermollodes Fraser-Jenk. & Challis; Pichisermollodes Fraser-Jenk.; Pleuripteris C.Chr.; Polypodiopsis Copel.; Polypodiopteris C.F.Reed; Pycnoloma C.Chr.; Sellimeris Fraser-Jenk., Sushil K.Singh & J.Fraser-Jenk.

= Selliguea =

Genus of ferns

Selliguea is a genus in the fern family Polypodiaceae. The type species is Selliguea feei.

== Species list ==
The following 127 species and two hybrids are accepted by Catalogue of Life as of July 2026:

- Selliguea albicaula (Copel.) M.Kato & M.G.Price
- Selliguea albidopaleata (Copel.) Parris
- Selliguea albidosquamata (Blume) Parris
- Selliguea albipes (C. Chr. & Ching) S. G. Lu
- Selliguea albopes (C.Chr. & Ching) S.G.Lu, Hovenkamp & M.G.Gilbert
- Selliguea amplexifolia (Christ) Christenh.
- Selliguea archboldii Copel.
- Selliguea bakeri (Luerss.) Hovenkamp
- Selliguea balbi Hovenkamp
- Selliguea bellisquamata (C.Chr.) Hovenkamp
- Selliguea bisulcata (Hook.) Hovenkamp
- Selliguea brachypodia (Copel.) Christenh.
- Selliguea brooksii (Alderw.) Hovenkamp
- Selliguea capitellata (Wall.) X.C.Zhang & L.J.He
- Selliguea caudiformis (Blume) J.Sm.
- Selliguea ceratophylla (Copel.) Hovenkamp
- Selliguea cesatiana (Baker) Christenh.
- Selliguea chenopus (Christ) S.G.Lu, Hovenkamp & M.G.Gilbert
- Selliguea chrysotricha (C.Chr.) Fraser-Jenk.
- Selliguea conjuncta (Ching) S.G.Lu, Hovenkamp & M.G.Gilbert
- Selliguea conmixta (Ching) S.G.Lu, Hovenkamp & M.G.Gilbert
- Selliguea connexa (Ching) S.G.Lu, Hovenkamp & M.G.Gilbert
- Selliguea costulata (Ces.) Wagner & Grether
- Selliguea craspedosora (Copel.) Hovenkamp
- Selliguea crassirhizoma (Fraser-Jenk., Odyou & D.K.Roy) R.Kr.Singh & V.K.Rawat
- Selliguea crenatopinnata (C.B.Clarke) S.G.Lu, Hovenkamp & M.G.Gilbert
- Selliguea cretifera (Alderw.) Ching
- Selliguea cruciformis (Ching) Fraser-Jenk.
- Selliguea cyrtomioides (S.G.Lu & C.D.Xu) Christenh.
- Selliguea dactylina (Christ) S.G.Lu, Hovenkamp & M.G.Gilbert
- Selliguea dareiformis (Hook.) X.C.Zhang & L.J.He
- Selliguea daweishanensis (S.G.Lu) S.G.Lu, Hovenkamp & M.G.Gilbert
- Selliguea dekockii (Alderw.) Hovenkamp
- Selliguea digitata (Ching) S.G.Lu, Hovenkamp & M.G.Gilbert
- Selliguea ebenipes (Hook.) S.Linds.
- Selliguea echinospora (Tagawa) Fraser-Jenk.
- Selliguea elmeri (Copel.) Ching
- Selliguea enervis (Cav.) Ching
- Selliguea engleri (Luerss.) Fraser-Jenk.
- Selliguea erythrocarpa (Mett.) X.C.Zhang & L.J.He
- Selliguea falcatopinnata (Hayata) H.Ohashi & K.Ohashi
- Selliguea feei Bory
- Selliguea feeioides Copel.
- Selliguea ferrea (Brause) Hovenkamp
- Selliguea glauca (J.Sm. ex Brack.) Hovenkamp
- Selliguea glaucopsis (Franch.) S.G.Lu, Hovenkamp & M.G.Gilbert
- Selliguea gracilipes (Alderw.) Hovenkamp
- Selliguea griffithiana (Hook.) Fraser-Jenk.
- Selliguea hainanensis (Ching) S.G.Lu, Hovenkamp & M.G.Gilbert
- Selliguea hastata (Thunb.) Fraser-Jenk.
- Selliguea hellwigii (Diels) Hovenkamp
- Selliguea heterocarpa (Blume) Blume
- Selliguea himalovata (Fraser-Jenk. & Kandel) Christenh.
- Selliguea hirtella (Ching) S.G.Lu, Hovenkamp & M.G.Gilbert
- Selliguea incisocrenata (Ching ex W.M.Chu & S.G.Lu) S.G.Lu, Hovenkamp & M.G.Gilbert
- Selliguea kachinensis Hovenkamp, S.Linds. & Fraser-Jenk.
- Selliguea kingpingensis (Ching) S.G.Lu, Hovenkamp & M.G.Gilbert
- Selliguea laciniata (C.Presl) Hovenkamp
- Selliguea lagunensis (Christ) Hovenkamp
- Selliguea lanceola (Mett.) E.Fourn.
- Selliguea lateritia (Baker) Hovenkamp
- Selliguea lauterbachii (Alderw.) Hovenkamp
- Selliguea lehmannii (Mett.) Christenh.
- Selliguea leucophora (Baker) Christenh.
- Selliguea likiangensis (Ching) S.G.Lu, Hovenkamp & M.G.Gilbert
- Selliguea majoensis (C.Chr.) Fraser-Jenk.
- Selliguea major (Fraser-Jenk.) R.Kr.Singh & V.K.Rawat
- Selliguea malacodon (Hook.) S.G.Lu, Hovenkamp & M.G.Gilbert
- Selliguea metacoela (Alderw.) Parris
- Selliguea moulmeinensis (Bedd.) X.C.Zhang & L.J.He
- Selliguea murudensis (C.Chr.) Parris
- Selliguea neglecta (Blume) Hovenkamp
- Selliguea nepalensis (Nakaike) K.Iwats.
- Selliguea nigropaleacea (Ching) S.G.Lu, Hovenkamp & M.G.Gilbert
- Selliguea nigrovenia (Christ) S.G.Lu, Hovenkamp & M.G.Gilbert
- Selliguea oblongifolia (S.K.Wu) S.G.Lu, Hovenkamp & M.G.Gilbert
- Selliguea obtusa (Ching) S.G.Lu, Hovenkamp & M.G.Gilbert
- Selliguea okamotoi (Tagawa) Ralf Knapp
- Selliguea omeiensis (Ching) S.G.Lu, Hovenkamp & M.G.Gilbert
- Selliguea oodes (Kunze) Hovenkamp
- Selliguea oxyloba (Wall. ex Kunze) Fraser-Jenk.
- Selliguea pampolycarpa (Alderw.) Hovenkamp
- Selliguea pampylocarpa (Alderw.) Hovenkamp
- Selliguea phuluangensis (Tagawa & K.Iwats.) Christenh.
- Selliguea pianmaensis (W.M.Chu) S.G.Lu, Hovenkamp & M.G.Gilbert
- Selliguea plantaginea Brack.
- Selliguea platyphylla (Sw.) Ching
- Selliguea plebiscopa (Baker) Pic.Serm.
- Selliguea proavita (Copel.) Christenh.
- Selliguea pseudoacrosticha (Alderw.) Hovenkamp
- Selliguea pui Hovenkamp
- Selliguea pyrolifolia (Goldm.) Hovenkamp
- Selliguea quasidivaricata (Hayata) H.Ohashi & K.Ohashi
- Selliguea quinquefida H.J.Wei
- Selliguea rhynchophylla (Hook.) Fraser-Jenk.
- Selliguea rigida (Hook.) Hovenkamp
- Selliguea roseomarginata (Ching) S.G.Lu, Hovenkamp & M.G.Gilbert
- Selliguea senanensis (Maxim.) S.G.Lu, Hovenkamp & M.G.Gilbert
- Selliguea setacea (Copel.) Hovenkamp
- Selliguea simplicissima (F.Muell.) Hovenkamp
- Selliguea soridens (Hook.) Hovenkamp
- Selliguea sri-ratu Hovenkamp
- Selliguea stenophylla (Blume) Parris
- Selliguea stenosquamis Hovenkamp
- Selliguea stewartii (Bedd.) S.G.Lu, Hovenkamp & M.G.Gilbert
- Selliguea subsparsa (Baker) Hovenkamp
- Selliguea subtaeniata (Alderw.) Hovenkamp
- Selliguea taeniata (Sw.) Parris
- Selliguea tafana (C.Chr.) Hovenkamp
- Selliguea taiwanensis (Tagawa) H.Ohashi & K.Ohashi
- Selliguea tamdaoensis (V.N.Tu) R.Kr.Singh & V.K.Rawat
- Selliguea tatsienensis (Franch. & Bureau ex Christ) Christenh.
- Selliguea tenuicauda (Hook.) Christenh.
- Selliguea tenuipes (Ching) S.G.Lu, Hovenkamp & M.G.Gilbert
- Selliguea tibetana (Ching & S.K.Wu) S.G.Lu, Hovenkamp & M.G.Gilbert
- Selliguea tomentosa (W.M.Chu) Christenh.
- Selliguea triloba (Houtt.) M.G.Price
- Selliguea triquetra (Blume) Ching
- Selliguea trisecta (Baker) Fraser-Jenk.
- Selliguea veitchii (Baker) H.Ohashi & K.Ohashi
- Selliguea violascens (Mett.) Hovenkamp
- Selliguea wardii (C.B.Clarke) Christenh.
- Selliguea whitfordii (Copel.) Hovenkamp
- Selliguea wuliangshanensis (W.M.Chu) S.G.Lu, Hovenkamp & M.G.Gilbert
- Selliguea wusugongii Liang Zhang, X.P.Fan & Li Bing Zhang
- Selliguea yakuinsularis (Masam.) H.Ohashi & K.Ohashi
- Selliguea yakushimensis (Makino) Fraser-Jenk.
- Selliguea × coronaterminalis (Fraser-Jenk. & Kandel) R.Kr.Singh & V.K.Rawat
- Selliguea × khasiana (Fraser-Jenk., Sushil K.Singh & J.Fraser-Jenk.) R.Kr.Singh & V.K.Rawat
