= Tasmanian ferns =

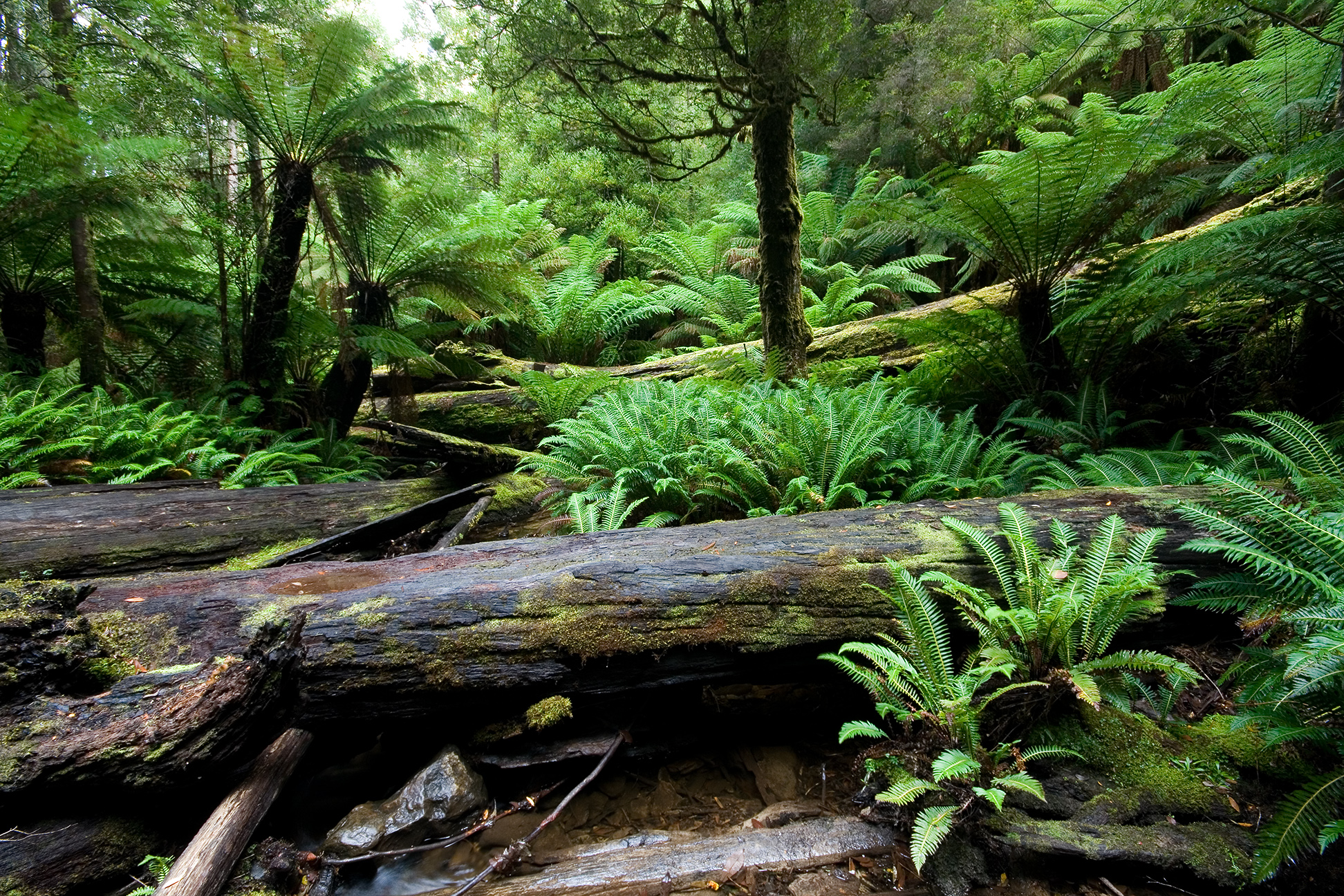
Ferns are a common sight in Tasmanian rainforests.

Tasmania is home to 'Australia’s largest cool temperate rainforests. Most of Tasmania’s rainforests occur in the North-West and throughout the North East highlands. Cool temperate rainforests typically have a heavy rainfall, cool climate, favor high altitudes and have a limited availability of light.

== Diversity ==
The diversity of vascular plants in cool temperate rainforests is unquestionably lower than in tropical rainforests as a result of the cooler climates and other various factors that reduce the growth rate of plants, such as the availability of light. Many of the species that are present in Tasmania’s cool temperate rainforests are endemic; this has been attributed to the isolation of Tasmania from the mainland during interglacial periods, which restricted the dispersal of many species between the two land masses. This high level of endemism results in Tasmania’s cool temperate rainforests being characterized by a community of rainforest species unique to the state. Portions of the species that have managed to dominate these unique forests are ferns. There is a diverse range of ferns present within these forests, which vary in form, size, substrate preference and habit. The following describes some of the major fern species to grow in Tasmania’s cool temperate rainforests.

== Species ==
Histiopteris incisa

- Histiopteris incisa

Commonly known as Batswing fern, its abundant in areas of high disturbance such as where a tree has fallen or a flood has occurred. Bats wing fern can form large colonies, growing from their own rhizome in the ground, excluding other species if it favors the environment enough. The pinnae are pale green with pinnules close to the stalk creating a ‘batwing’ shape giving the fern its common name. Histiopteris incisa has a worldwide distribution.

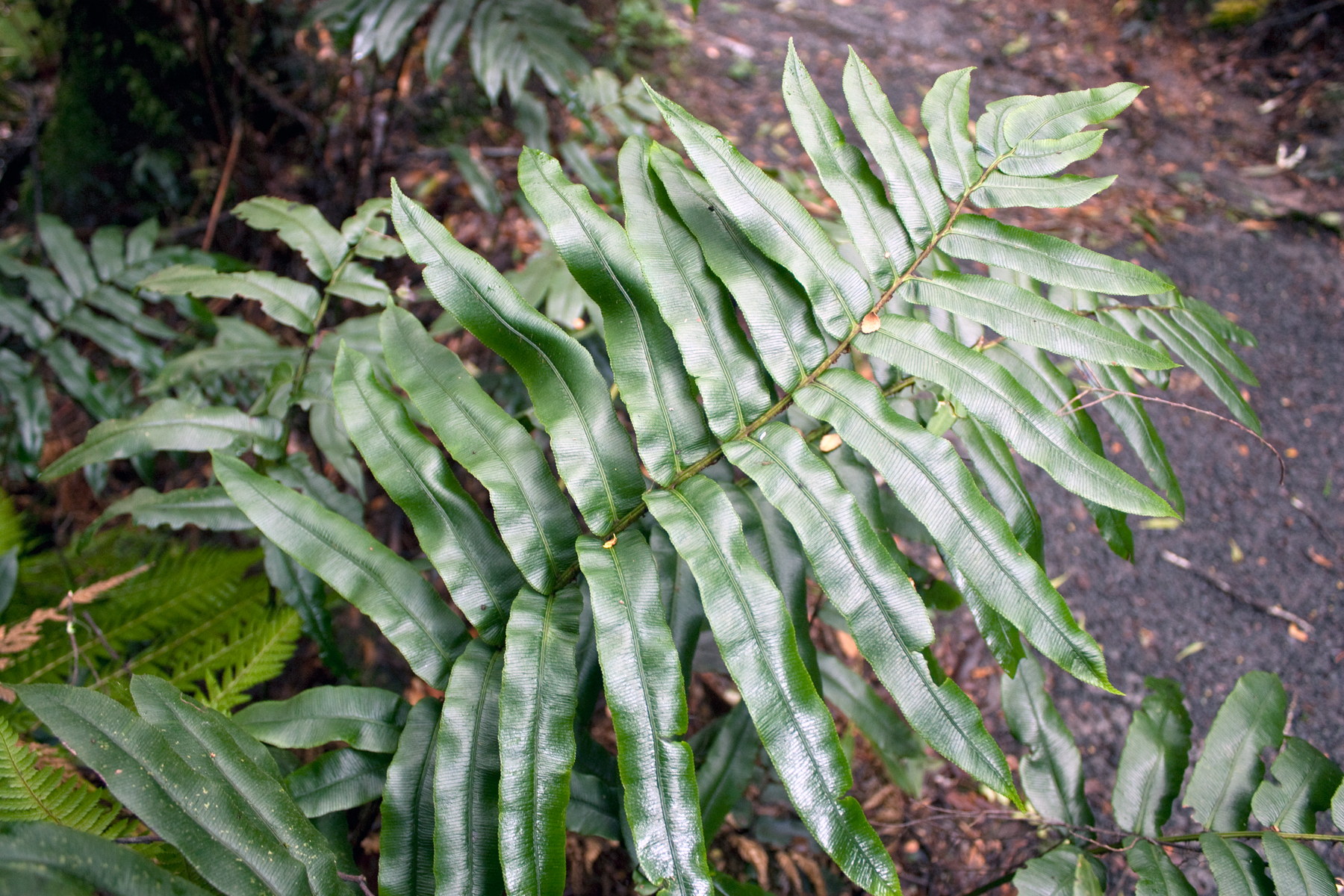
Parablechnum wattsii

- Parablechnum wattsii

Also known as hard waterfern, Parablechnum wattsii has thick large fronds growing from its rhizome in the ground. There are two types of fronds on this species, one being a sterile frond, and the other a fertile frond. Parablechnum wattsii prefers very wet areas and cannot tolerate dry soils. Hard waterfern prefers to grow as an individual rather than a large colony. This fern is able to tolerate waterlogged sites, sites with poor soil quality, and windy sites.

- Lomaria nuda

Lomaria nuda is also known as fishbone fern as its pinnules are arranged like the bones of a fish. This species grows from its creeping rhizome which can form an erect sturdy trunk as high as one meter. Like Parablechnum wattsii, Lomaria nuda has two types of fronds, one frond is sterol while the other is fertile and also prefers wet habitats.

- Asplenium appendiculatum

Asplenium appendiculatum is a fern that grows in the understory of wet forests. The fern grows along its rhizome that spreads over the ground, rocks and up the trunks of Dicksonia Antarctica.

- Hypolepis ruglosa

Hypolepis ruglosa is a ground fern common to Tasmania’s cool temperate rainforests. The fern is more common in high altitude, wet rainforests. This fern is easily identified by the red-brown color of the frond stems and like Histiopteris incisa, grows most abundantly in disturbed areas.

- Dicksonia antarctica

Dicksonia antarctica is the most common tree fern in south eastern Australian rainforests. The tree fern forms outgrowths of fibrous rootlets on its erect rhizome that forming a strong trunk. This trunk provides a substrate on which other plants can germinate and grow. Dicksonia antarctica needs moisture to grow and resents dry soils.

Polystichum proliferum

- Polystichum proliferum

Commonly known as mother shield fern Polystichum proliferum, favors moist cool areas with filtered shade, hence why it grows abundantly in cool temperate rainforests. The fern grows terrestrially along its rhizome in the ground and can form a strong trunk up to 10 cm high.

- Rumohra adiantiformis

Rumohra adiantiformis, also known by the name of leathery shieldfern or iron fern, is a common fern in Tasmania’s cool temperate rainforests. Leatherleaf fern extends along its rhizome in the ground and grows upright as part of a forests groundcover. Triangle-shaped glossy dark leaflets characterize the fern. This plant is not endemic to Tasmania and has a broad distribution. The fern can be found on mainland Australia, New Zealand and far away places such as South Africa, and the Galapagos Islands.

- Notogrammitis billardierei

Also known at finger fern, Notogrammitis billardierei is small epiphytic fern that can be found growing on branches, rocks, and logs within Tasmania’s cool temperate forests. One of the finger ferns most preferred substrates in on the trunks of Dicksonia antarctica. The fern is not only found in Tasmania but also on the Australian mainland and New Zealand.

- Microsorum pustulatum

Commonly known as kangaroo fern, Microsorum pustulatum has smooth leathery bright green fronds. They spread via the fragmentation of their hairy rhizomes and can live as epiphytic plant growing on the trunks of plants such as Dicksonia antarctica or as a lithophytic plant growing over rocks and logs. The plant is distributed over mainland Australia and Tasmania

- Hymenophyllum sp.

Commonly named filmy ferns, there are many species of Hypmenophyllum to be found in Tasmania’s cool temperate rainforests, two species that are most common are Hymenophyllum flabellatum, and Hymenophyllum rarum. Filmy ferns are epiphytic ferns that creep along rhizomes at the base of tree ferns and tree trunks. The fern is very thin with leaves only one cell thick. Given the delicate nature of these ferns they are prone to desiccation. They are therefore their distribution is limited to very humid moist habitats such as cool temperate rainforests. Slight changes in the ecology of Tasmania’s cool temperate rainforests could have a huge negative effect on filmy fern populations.

Tasmanian ferns
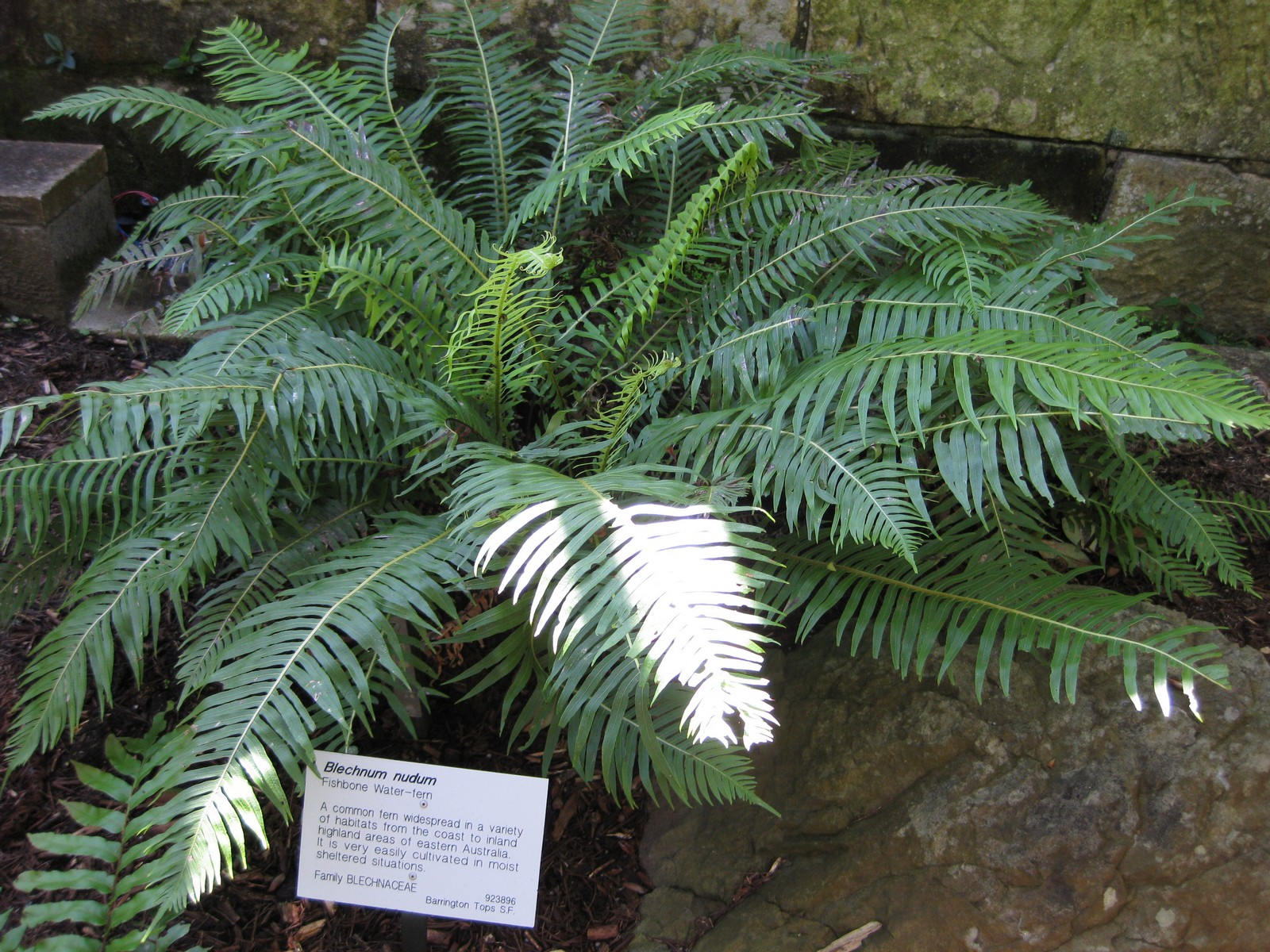
Lomaria nuda

Asplenium appendiculatum

Dicksonia antarctica

Rumohra adiantiformis

Notogrammitis billardierei

Microsorum pustulatum

Hymenophyllum flabellatum

== Distribution ==
Figure 1 : A table showing different species of fern found in different habitats in Tasmania.
	Lomaria nuda syn. Blechnum nudum	Parablechnum wattsii syn. Blechnum wattsii	Hymenophyllum sp.	Polystichum proliferum	Pteridium esculentum	Histopteris incisa	Dicksonia antarctica
Wet sclerophyll forest	Yes	Yes	-	-	-	-	Yes
Mixed forest	-	-	Yes	-	-	-	Yes
Rainforest	Yes	Yes	-	Yes	-	-	Yes
Logging coup clear-felled burnt in 2008	-	-	-	Yes	-	-	Yes
Logging coup clear-felled burnt in 2006	-	-	-	Yes	-	-	Yes
Clearfelled and burnt in 1999 “natural regeneration”	-	-	-	Yes	-	-	Yes
Clearfelled and burnt in 1990	-	Yes	-	-	Yes	Yes	Yes

Dicksonia antarctica is possibly one of the most common ferns found in Tasmania, and is found at many different habitats. This table shows that areas left undisturbed for longer periods of time are host to more species of ferns. The habitat clearfelled and burnt in 1990 has more species of fern present than areas disturbed by forestry in more recent years.

== Conservation ==
Human activities, such as deforestation or wildfires, often disturb the fragile ecological balance of the rainforest.

Tasmania’s cool temperate rainforest are currently under threat for a variety of reasons. One of the greatest threats to rainforests is from human induced activities. Fire is one of the largest problems facing rainforests today, either from direct or accidental origin. Although fire can be of benefit to some habitats, species that have evolved in rainforests have not yet been exposed to fire and haven’t acquired the capacity to survive or regenerate in the event of a fire. Such species can include Hymenophyllum sp. and Grammitis billardierei. In the past 100 years over 7% of Tasmania’s fires have been burnt as a result of arson or industry. Industry poses a huge threat to Tasmanian rainforests. Often the land that rainforests grow on is wanted to convert into mines, dams or agricultural land. Climate change also can have a large effect on the ecology of cool temperate rainforests. Many species living within these forests can only survive in a narrow range of ecological conditions as they have evolved within areas of such stable climatic conditions. Small changes in the climate as a result of climate change can have negative effects on the growth and dispersal of sensitive rainforest species such as Hymenophyllum sp. These plants are therefore heavily dependent on the conservation of Tasmania’s cool temperate rainforests. Roughly 41% of Tasmania’s rainforests are protected by wilderness world heritage areas, another 25% are protected via reserves, yet the remaining 34% are left unprotected.
