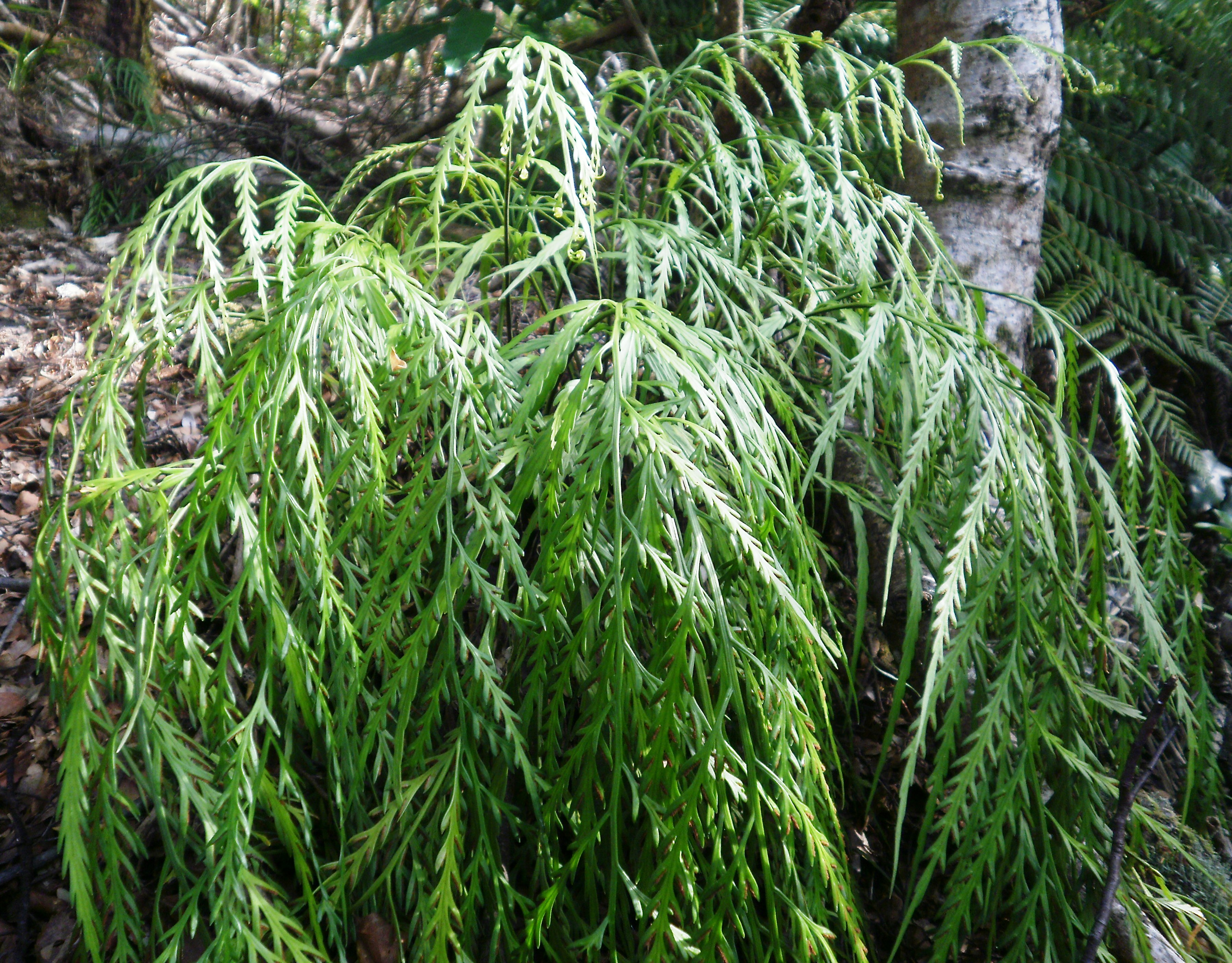

Scientific classification
- Kingdom: Plantae
- Clade: Tracheophytes
- Division: Polypodiophyta
- Class: Polypodiopsida
- Order: Polypodiales
- Suborder: Aspleniineae
- Family: Aspleniaceae
- Genus: Asplenium
- Species: A. flaccidum

Binomial name
- Asplenium flaccidum G.Forst.

= Asplenium flaccidum =

Species of fern in the spleenwort family

Asplenium flaccidum is a species of fern in the family Aspleniaceae. The plant common name is drooping spleenwort or weeping spleenwort, and the species name flaccidum derives from the Latin root meaning drooping. The plant is also known in its native New Zealand by the Māori name makawe. An example occurrence of A. flaccidum is within a Nothofagus-Podocarp forest at Hamilton Ecological District on New Zealand's North Island in association with other fern species understory plants, Crown fern (''Blechnum discolor'') being an example.

== Taxonomy ==
A global phylogeny of Asplenium published in 2020 divided the genus into eleven clades (groups), which were given informal names pending further taxonomic study. A. flaccidum belongs to the "Neottopteris clade", members of which generally have somewhat leathery leaf tissue. It forms a clade with A. appendiculatum and A. chathamense.
