= William Walter Watts =

Reverend William Walter Watts (1856–1920) was one of New South Wales's greatest authorities on moss. He might be best known for his unfinished Census of Australian Mosses. The fern genus Revwattsia is named in his honour as are at least 30 other species including the fern species Grammitis wattsii.

The standard author abbreviation Watts is used to indicate this person as the author when citing a botanical name.
