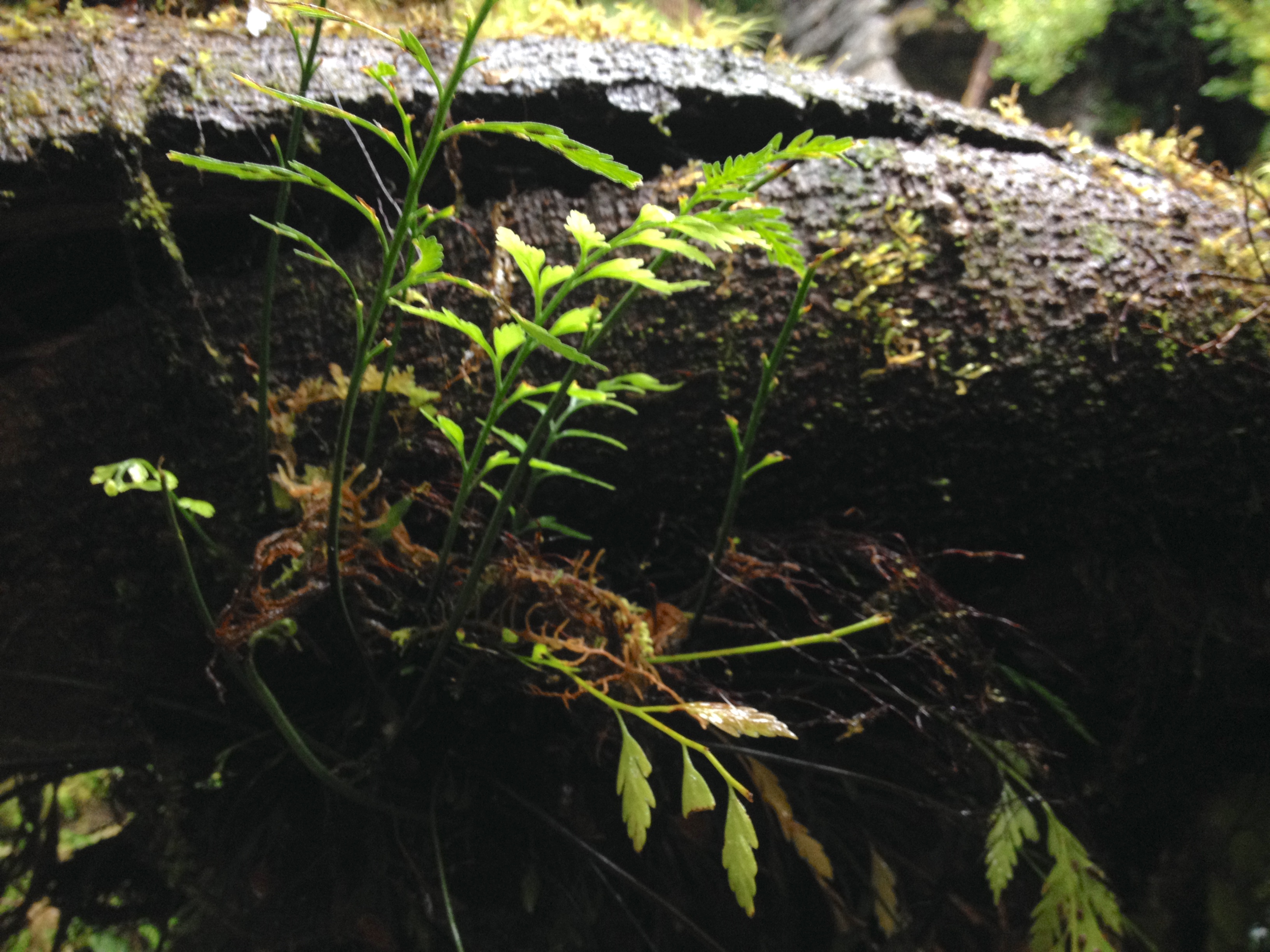

Scientific classification
- Kingdom: Plantae
- Clade: Tracheophytes
- Division: Polypodiophyta
- Class: Polypodiopsida
- Order: Polypodiales
- Suborder: Aspleniineae
- Family: Aspleniaceae
- Genus: Asplenium
- Species: A. appendiculatum

Binomial name
- Asplenium appendiculatum C.Presl

= Asplenium appendiculatum =

Species of fern

Asplenium appendiculatum (formerly known as Asplenium terrestre), ground spleenwort, is a common native fern to Australia and New Zealand. It usually grows in cool damp conditions, among rocks, on logs or as an epiphyte.

== Description ==
Asplenium appendiculatum has foliage that is dark green, with blades that are 100-300 × 50–150 mm long, leathery and slightly drooping. Blade is lanceolate (slightly wider at a short distance above the base, tapering to a point at the tip) to oblong (tapering at the ends but about the same width throughout) in shape. Stipe (stalk below the blade) is 50–150 mm long is grooved, green above, brown below and scattered with narrow triangle scales. The rachis (stalk within the blade) is green, scaly and prominently ridged. Pinnae (leaflets) are 8-20 alternate pairs, ranging from 30-100mm long × 5-30mm wide. Those at the base of the blade are ovate with those towards the tip, very narrowly ovate or elliptic. They are often long and relatively undivided tips. Stalks are covered with tiny scales on the underside. Pinnules at the base of the blade are narrowly elliptic and pinnate, up to 30 x 8mm. Pinnules towards the tip of the blade are linear, entire and sessile. Rhizomes (underground stems) are short and are covered with linear, tapering dark brown scales. Each pinnule on a fertile frond has sori. They are sub marginal and 2-7mm, oblong in shape.

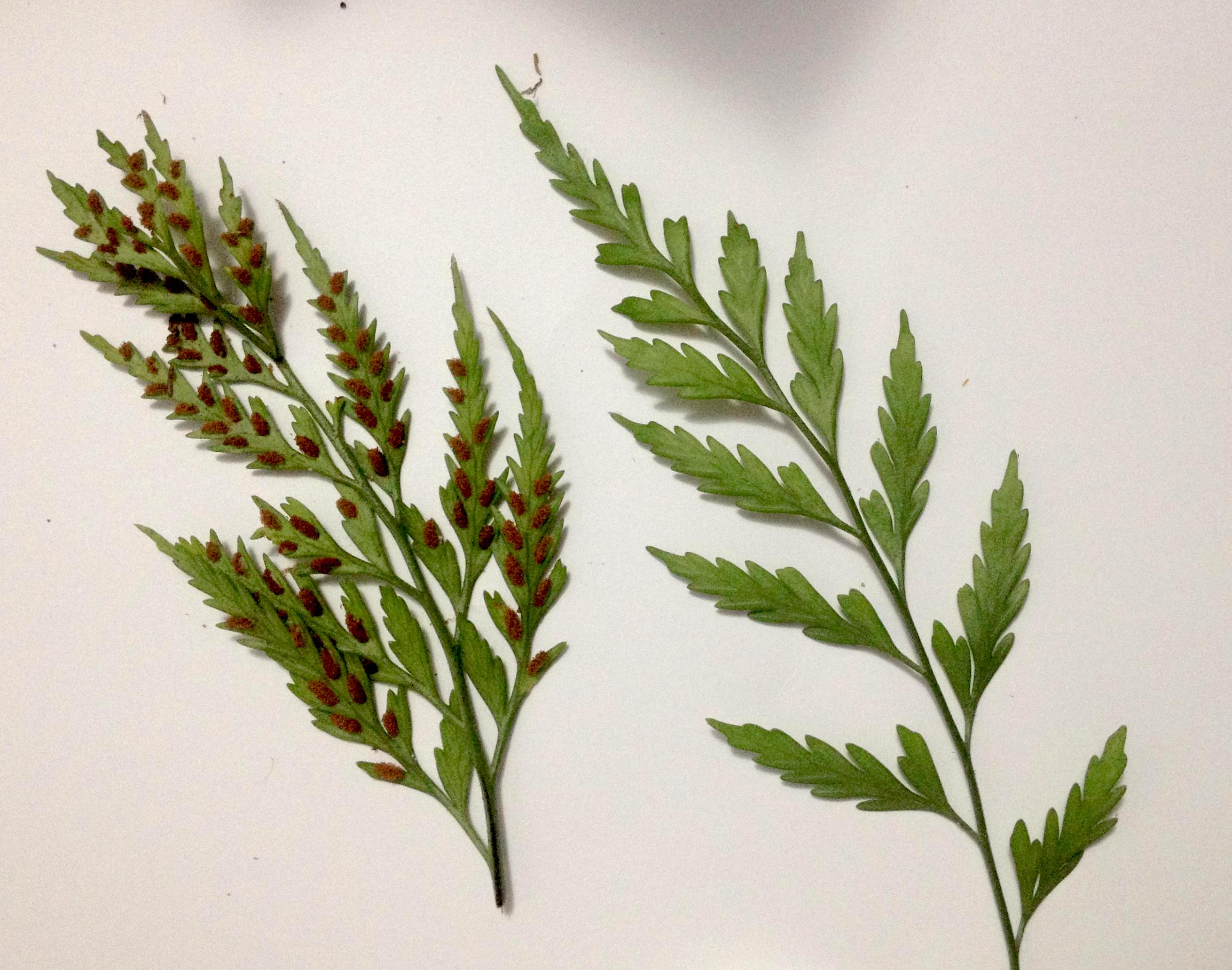
Asplenium appendiculatum frond from above (right) and below (left). Note the many sori.

Asplenium appendiculatum is often confused with Asplenium bulbiferum, however lacks bulbils (vegetative clones of the fern).

== Taxonomy and Name ==
Both the common and scientific name ‘spleenwort’ is derived from Asplenium species being used under the doctrine of signatures, to treat ailments of the spleen. This was belief was based on the spleen shaped sori. ‘Wort’ is an ancient English term that means ‘plant’. The species name appendiculatum, is Latin for 'with appendages.

Asplenium appendiculatum was formerly known as Asplenium terrestre, meaning ground dwelling. This name was derived from its terrestrial growth habit in New Zealand, where it was discovered by P. J. Brownsey in 1977. It was once thought to be endemic to New Zealand.

== Taxonomy ==
A global phylogeny of Asplenium published in 2020 divided the genus into eleven clades, which were given informal names pending further taxonomic study. A. appendiculatum belongs to the "Neottopteris clade", members of which generally have somewhat leathery leaf tissue. It forms a clade with A. flaccidum and A. chathamense.

== Habitat and distribution ==
=== Tasmania ===
In Tasmania Asplenium appendiculatum grows in wet sclerophyll forests, fern gullies and rocky outcrops on low mountain summits. It often grows as an epiphyte on Dicksonia antarctica and on logs and other tree species.

=== Victoria ===
Asplenium appendiculatum is rare in Victoria. It has been observed in the Victoria Range, Mt Mueller and Wilsons Promontory.

=== New Zealand ===
In New Zealand, Asplenium appendiculatum grows in lowland to subalpine forested areas, but is also found in bluffs and rocky outcrops in grey scrub.
