= Grammitis basalis =

Conservation status
- Endangered (IUCN 3.1)

Scientific classification
- Kingdom: Plantae
- Clade: Tracheophytes
- Division: Polypodiophyta
- Class: Polypodiopsida
- Order: Polypodiales
- Suborder: Polypodiineae
- Family: Polypodiaceae
- Genus: Grammitis
- Species: G. basalis

Binomial name
- Grammitis basalis (Maxon ex C.V.Morton) Lellinger

Species of fern

Grammitis basalis is a species of fern in the family Polypodiaceae. It is endemic to Ecuador. Its natural habitat is subtropical or tropical moist lowland forests. It is threatened by habitat loss.
