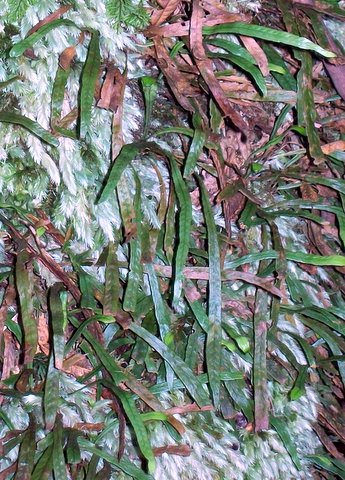
- Grammitis billardierei

Scientific classification
- Kingdom: Plantae
- Clade: Tracheophytes
- Division: Polypodiophyta
- Class: Polypodiopsida
- Order: Polypodiales
- Suborder: Polypodiineae
- Family: Polypodiaceae
- Subfamily: Grammitidoideae
- Genus: Grammitis; O. Swartz

Type species
- Grammitis marginella (O. Swartz) O. Swartz

Species
- See text

Synonyms
- Synonymy: Acrosorus Copel.; Adenophorus Gaudich.; Aenigmatogrammitis Parris; Alansmia M.Kessler, Moguel, Sundue & Labiak; Amphoradenium Desv.; Archigrammitis Parris; Ascogrammitis Sundue; Boonkerdia Li Bing Zhang, Pollawatn, X.M.Zhou & Liang Zhang; Calligrammitis Parris, Sundue, Li Bing Zhang, X.M.Zhou & Ralf Knapp; Calymmodon C.Presl; Ceradenia L.E.Bishop; Chilopteris (C.Presl) Lindl.; Chrysogrammitis Parris; Cochlidium Kaulf.; Cryptosorus Fée; Ctenopterella Parris; Ctenopteris Blume ex Kunze; Dasygrammitis Parris; Devolia Li Bing Zhang, X.M.Zhou, Jian Jun Yang & Ralf Knapp; Enterosora Baker; Galactodenia Sundue & Labiak; Glabrigrammitis Li Bing Zhang, X.M.Zhou, Jian Jun Yang & Parris; Glyphotaenium (J.Sm.) J.Sm.; Grammitastrum (E.Fourn.) Parris, Sundue, Li Bing Zhang & X.M.Zhou; Howeogrammitis Parris, Sundue, Li Bing Zhang & X.M.Zhou; Lellingeria A.R.Sm. & R.C.Moran; Leucotrichum Labiak; Lomaphlebia J.Sm.; Luisma M.T.Murillo & A.R.Sm.; Melpomene A.R.Sm. & R.C.Moran; Micropolypodium Hayata; Micropteris Desv.; Moranopteris R.Y.Hirai & J.Prado; Mycopteris Sundue; Nanogrammitis Parris, Li Bing Zhang, X.M.Zhou & Liang Zhang; Nematopteris Alderw.; Notogrammitis Parris; Oreogrammitis Copel.; Oxygrammitis Parris & Sundue; Parrisia Shalisko & Sundue; Plectopteris Fée; Pleurogramma J.Sm.; Pleurogramme (Blume) C.Presl; Prosaptia C.Presl; Radiogrammitis Parris; Rouhania Li Bing Zhang, X.M.Zhou, Jian Jun Yang & Liang Zhang; Scleroglossum Alderw.; Stenofilix Nakai; Stenogrammitis Labiak; Terpsichore A.R.Sm.; Thalassogrammitis Parris, Sundue, Li Bing Zhang & X.M.Zhou; Themelium (T.Moore) Parris; Tomophyllum (E.Fourn.) Parris; Xiphopterella Parris; Xiphopteris Kaulf.; Zygophlebia L.E.Bishop

= Grammitis =

Genus of plants

Grammitis (dwarf polypody) is a genus of ferns in the family Polypodiaceae, subfamily Grammitidoideae, according to the Pteridophyte Phylogeny Group classification of 2016 (PPG I). It had formerly been placed in the family Grammitidaceae, but this family is no longer recognized by most authors because phylogenetic analyses of DNA sequences have shown that it is embedded in Polypodiaceae.

The delimitation of Grammitis was drastically narrowed in the first decade of the 21st century. It now contains about 25 species. In 2003, a study of the distribution of grammitid ferns placed 11 species in the New World, 7 in Africa, and 4 in the Pacific.

The genus Grammitis was established by Olof Swartz around 1801. (sources vary on the exact date). The name is derived from Greek, gramma, grammatos meaning "a line or thread" and refers to the arrangement of the sori in some species. The type species for Grammitis is Grammitis marginella.

The only known fossil of a grammitid fern has been named Grammitis succinea, but it is not clear that it belongs to Grammitis as more recently defined. It was found in Oligocene amber from the Dominican Republic.

== Circumscription ==
In a treatment of Grammitidaceae in 1990, Barbara S. Parris defined Grammitis broadly, to include about 400 species. At that time, she stated that "The treatment of Grammitis here as a large and diverse genus reflects our current lack of knowledge concerning relationships within the family". Other authors at that time circumscribed Grammitis more narrowly, to include about 200 species.

Since about 2003, Grammitis has been understood as a genus of about 25 species with the other species to be eventually transferred to other genera, most of them new or resurrected. Grammitis sensu strictissimo (about 25 species) is distinguished by its black, sclerified leaf margins. It is sister to the monophyletic genus Cochlidium.

In 2004, Grammitis was shown to be polyphyletic if broadly circumscribed. Grammitis tenella had been shown to be closely related to Adenophorus in 2003, and the new combination Adenophorus tenellus was published in 2008. Several species formerly in Grammitis have been transferred to Oreogrammitis. These include Oreogrammitis clemensiae, Oreogrammitis hookeri, and others. The genera Ctenopterella, Dasygrammitis, Radiogrammitis, Tomophyllum, and Xiphopterella were established in 2007 and some of these contain species that were formerly in Grammitis. Lellingeria tomensis was moved out of Grammitis to Lellingeria in 2004. Transfers to other genera have also been made. The classification of Grammitis basalis, Grammitis recondita, and others remains undecided.

Plants of the World Online circumscribes Grammitis broadly, with 700 species and 56 generic synonyms.

== Species ==
The species list is incomplete and may contain synonyms. It was originally based on two very old sources.

- Grammitis basalis (Maxon ex C.V.Morton) Lellinger 1984 (Ecuador)
  (=) Polypodium basale Maxon ex C.V.Morton 1962
- Grammitis billardierei Willd. 1810
  (=) Polypodium billardierei C.Chr. 1906
- Grammitis bryophila (Maxon) F.Seym. 1975
  (=) Grammitis haplophlebica (A.C.Sm.) Vareschi 1969
  (=) Polypodium haplophlebicum A.C. Sm. 1931
  (=) Polypodium bryophilum Maxon 1926
- Grammitis diminuta (Baker) Copel. 1952 (Lord Howe Island, Australia)
- Grammitis fluminensis Fée 1869 (Brazil, Jamaica, Colombia, Venezuela)
- Grammitis kyimbilensis (Brause) Copel. 1952 (Madagascar)
  (=) Grammitis pseudomarginella (Bonap.) Copel. 1952
- Grammitis leptopoda (C.H. Wright) Copel. 1952 (Colombia, Costa Rica, Guyana, Venezuela)
  (=) Polypodium leptopodon C.H. Wright 1901
- Grammitis limbata Fée 1852 (Neotropics)
  (=) Grammitis nigrolimbata (Spruce ex Jenman) Lellinger 1977
  (=) Polypodium hessii Maxon 1915
  (=) Polypodium limbatum (Fée) Maxon 1915
  (=) Polypodium nigrolimbatum Spruce ex Jenman 1897 (nom. illeg.)
  (=) Grammitis nigrolimbata Spruce ex Hook. 1862 (nom. inval., nom. nud.)
- Grammitis marginella (Sw.) Sw. 1801 (Caribbean, Costa Rica, Jamaica, Panama)
  (=) Mecosorus marginellus (Sw.) Klotzsch 1847
  (=) Polypodium marginellum Sw. 1788
- Grammitis marginelloides (J.W. Moore) Copel. 1938
  (=) Polypodium marginelloides J.W. Moore 1933
- Grammitis melanoloma (Cordem.) Tardieu 1959
  (=) Polypodium melanoloma (Boiv.) Cordem. 1891
- Grammitis microglossa (C.Chr.) Ching 1941 (Madagascar)
  (=) Polypodium microglossum C.Chr. 1932
- Grammitis nudicarpa Copel. 1942 (Lord Howe Island, Australia)
- Grammitis peritimundi L.E.Bishop & A.R.Sm. (Venezuela)
- Grammitis paramicola L.E.Bishop 1977 (Colombia, Costa Rica, Honduras, Peru, Venezuela)
- Grammitis poeppigiana (Mett.) Pic.Serm. 1978
  (=) Polypodium poeppigianum Mett. 1857
- Grammitis quaerenda Bolle 1863
- Grammitis recondita C.V.Morton 1971 (Ecuador)
- Grammitis stenophylla Parris 1975 (Australia)
- Grammitis tegetiformis L.E.Bishop 1977 (Venezuela)
- Grammitis vaupelii (Brause) Copel. 1952 (Samoa)
  (=) Polypodium vaupelii Brause 1922
- Grammitis wattsii Copel. 1942 (Lord Howe Island, Australia)

=== Transferred species ===
- Adenophorus tenellus (Kaulf.) Ranker 2008 – kolokolo (Hawaii)
  (=) Grammitis tenella Kaulf. 1824
  (=) Polypodium pseudogrammitis Gaudich. 1827
