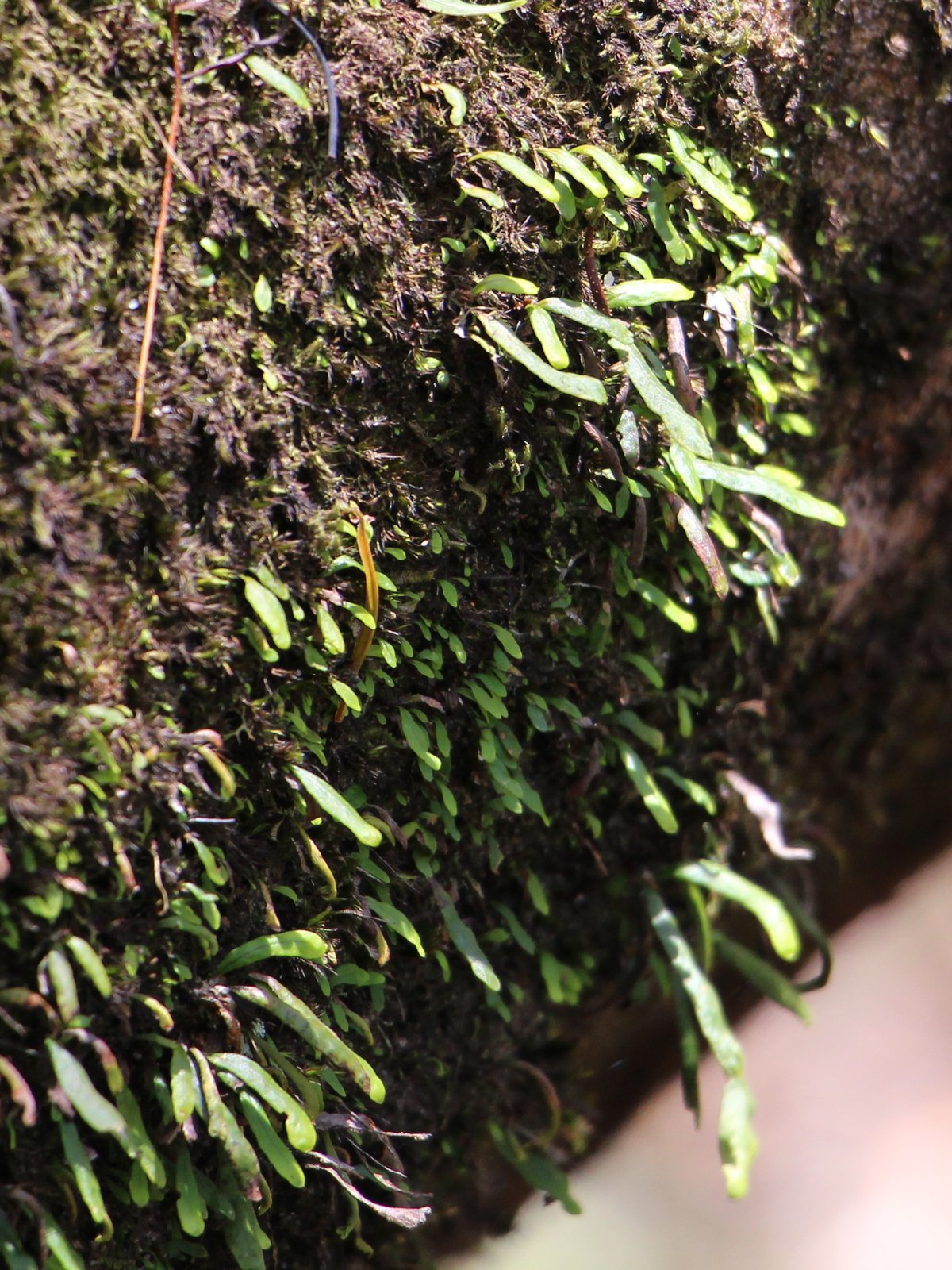
- at Turramurra, NSW

Scientific classification
- Kingdom: Plantae
- Clade: Tracheophytes
- Division: Polypodiophyta
- Class: Polypodiopsida
- Order: Polypodiales
- Suborder: Polypodiineae
- Family: Polypodiaceae
- Genus: Grammitis
- Species: G. stenophylla

Binomial name
- Grammitis stenophylla Parris

= Grammitis stenophylla =

Species of fern

Grammitis stenophylla, commonly known as the narrow-leafed finger fern, is a fern in the family Polypodiaceae native to New South Wales and Queensland in eastern Australia. The fronds are 1–6 cm in length, winged almost to the base, lacking hairs; lamina oblanceolate, apex obtuse to acute, glabrous, thin but leathery. Sori subglobose to oblong, in the upper two-thirds of the frond. 2–25 pairs of fronds.
