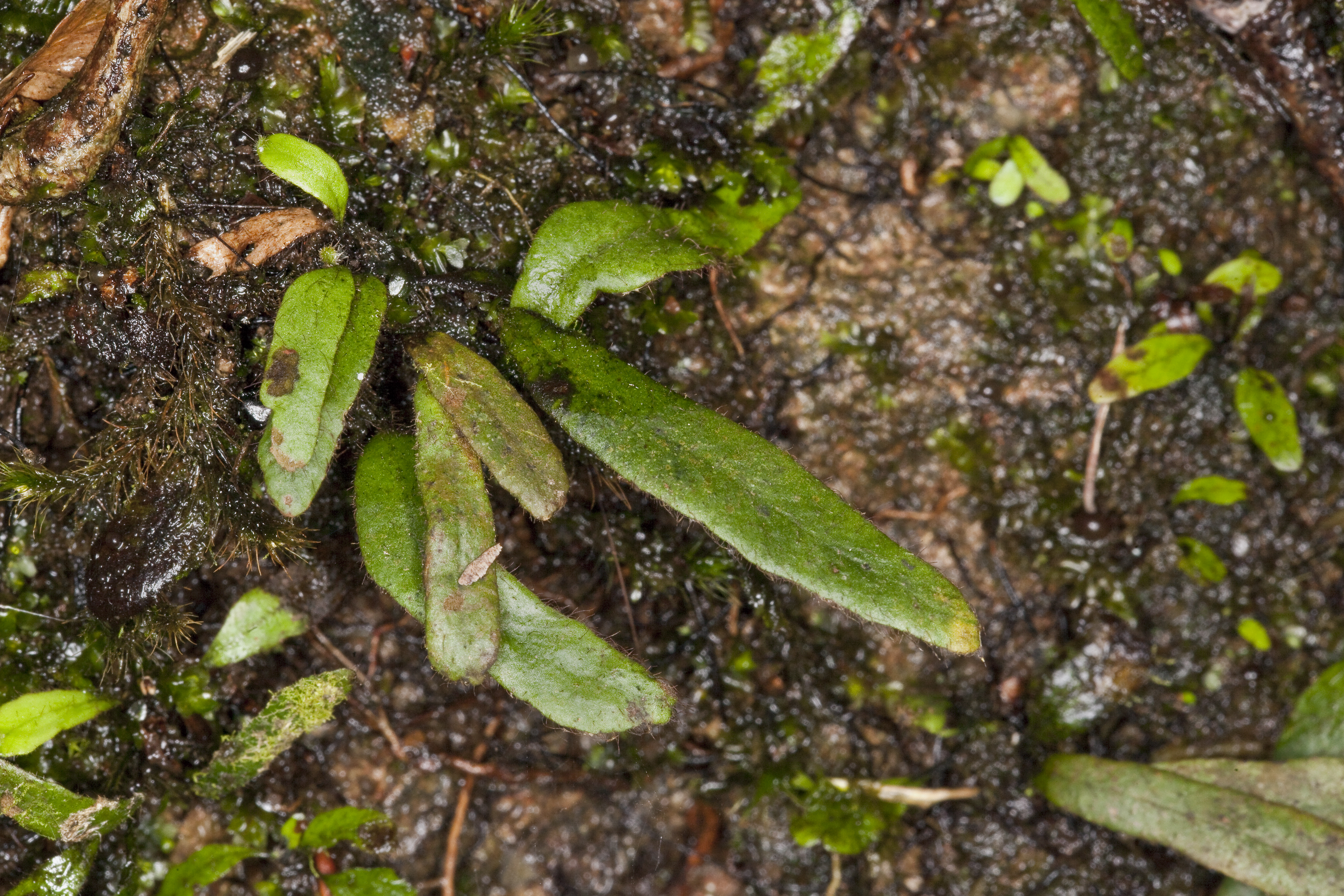

Scientific classification
- Kingdom: Plantae
- Clade: Tracheophytes
- Division: Polypodiophyta
- Class: Polypodiopsida
- Order: Polypodiales
- Suborder: Polypodiineae
- Family: Polypodiaceae
- Genus: Grammitis
- Species: G. nudicarpa

Binomial name
- Grammitis nudicarpa Copel.

= Grammitis nudicarpa =

Species of fern

Grammitis nudicarpa is a fern in the family Polypodiaceae.

== Description ==
The plant is a very small epiphytic fern. It has a short rhizome with dark brown, pointed scales. Its simple fronds combine a short stipe with a narrowly oblanceolate lamina 2–8 cm long and 0.3–0.8 cm wide.

== Distribution and habitat ==
The fern is endemic to Australia’s subtropical Lord Howe Island in the Tasman Sea; it is confined to the densely shaded summit areas of Mounts Lidgbird and Gower.
