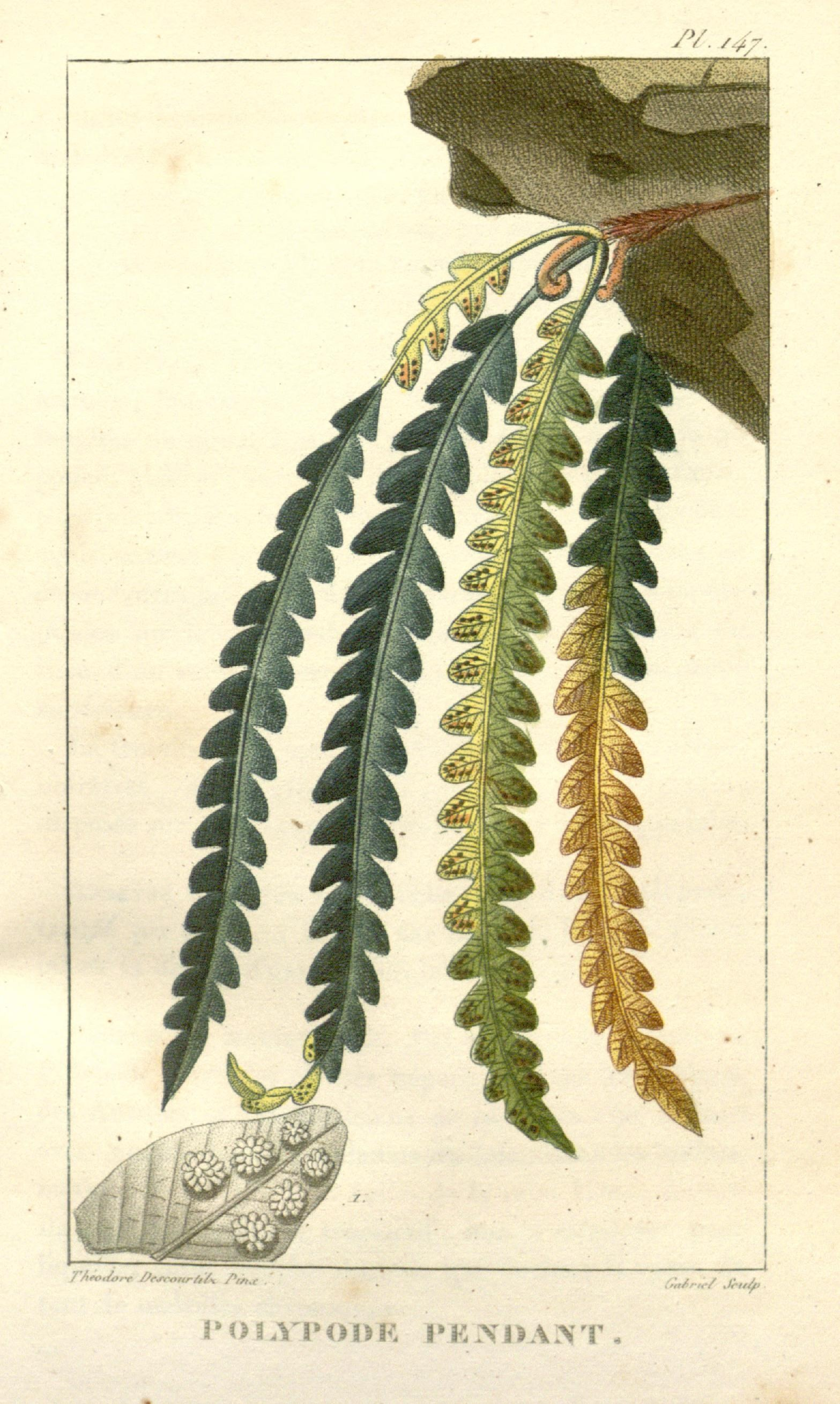
- Lellingeria suspensa

Scientific classification
- Kingdom: Plantae
- Clade: Embryophytes
- Clade: Tracheophytes
- Division: Polypodiophyta
- Class: Polypodiopsida
- Order: Polypodiales
- Suborder: Polypodiineae
- Family: Polypodiaceae
- Subfamily: Grammitidoideae
- Genus: Lellingeria; A.R. Smith & R.C. Moran

Type species
- Lellingeria apiculata (Kunze ex Klotzsch) A.R. Smith & R.C. Moran

Species
- See text

= Lellingeria =

Genus of ferns

Lellingeria is a genus of ferns in the family Polypodiaceae, subfamily Grammitidoideae, according to the Pteridophyte Phylogeny Group classification of 2016 (PPG I).

About 50–70 species of Lellingeria are known. They are native to tropical areas of Madagascar, Africa, the Americas, and Pacific Islands. None are known in cultivation. Lellingeria was named for the American pteridologist David Lellinger.

== Description ==
Mostly epiphytes. Rhizome radially symmetrical or dorsiventral, with clathrate, usually blackish scales that are attached across their entire base. Petiole absent or much shorter than the lamina. Sterile portion of frond shallowly to deeply pinnately divided. Fertile portion entire to deeply pinnately divided. (A few species with fronds pinnate-pinnatifid). Veins simple, free (not anastomosing). Hydathodes present. Sori round or elliptic, often slightly sunken, without paraphyses.

== Taxonomy ==
The genus Lellingeria was erected in 1991. At that time, it consisted of 52 species, three newly described, and 49 transferred from the artificial (unnatural) genus Grammitis. In 2004, a phylogenetic study of DNA sequences of two chloroplast genes showed that Lellingeria, as defined in 1991, was polyphyletic. This was confirmed six years later. In 2010, four species were removed from Lellingeria and combined with one species from the defunct genus Xiphopteris to form the new genus Leucotrichum. The remaining species of Lellingeria form a monophyletic genus that is sister to the genus Melpomene.

When Lellingeria was established in 1991, thirty-five of its species were assigned to four species groups. This infra-generic classification did not hold up, because one of these groups had to be separated as Leucotrichum, and because another two of these groups were not truly distinct, but intermixed. Lellingeria, as currently circumscribed consists of two groups, one with about 20 species, and another with about 50. The smaller group is easily distinguished by morphological characters, but the larger group is more diverse. These two groups have not been formally named as subgenera or sections within Lellingeria.

Lellingeria can be distinguished from Melpomene by the lack of setae, the presence of hairs on the rhizome, the sparse covering of very short hair on the upper surface of the rachis or midrib, and by the sori, which are slightly sunken into the lamina.

When Lellingeria was first described in 1991, it was thought to always have a radially symmetrical rhizome, but it has since been learned that some of the species that belong in Lellingeria have a dorsiventral rhizome. The unequally forked hairs are almost always present, but they are not a synapomorphy for Lellingeria.

=== Species ===
As of April 2025, the Checklist of Ferns and Lycophytes of the World accepted the following fifty-two species:

- Lellingeria affinis Labiak
- Lellingeria amplisora Labiak
- Lellingeria antillensis (Proctor) A.R.Sm. & R.C.Moran
- Lellingeria apiculata (Kunze ex Klotzsch) A.R.Sm. & R.C.Moran
- Lellingeria barbensis (Lellinger) A.R.Sm. er R.C.Moran
- Lellingeria bishopii Labiak
- Lellingeria brasiliensis (Rosenst.) Labiak
- Lellingeria brenesii A.Rojas
- Lellingeria brevistipes (Mett. ex Kuhn) A.R.Sm. & R.C.Moran
- Lellingeria calolepis Labiak
- Lellingeria cantarensis B.K.Black & Sundue
- Lellingeria ciliolepis (C.Chr.) A.R.Sm.
- Lellingeria depressa (C.Chr.) A.R.Sm. & R.C.Moran
- Lellingeria dissimulans (Maxon) A.R.Sm.
- Lellingeria epiphytica (Copel.) A.R.Sm. & R.C.Moran
- Lellingeria flagellipinnata M.Kessler & A.R.Sm.
- Lellingeria flexibilis Labiak
- Lellingeria hombersleyi (Maxon) A.R.Sm.
- Lellingeria humilis (Mett.) A.R.Sm. & R.C.Moran
- Lellingeria isidrensis (Maxon ex Copel.) A.R.Sm. & R.C.Moran
- Lellingeria itatimensis (C.Chr.) A.R.Sm. & R.C.Moran
- Lellingeria jimenezii Labiak
- Lellingeria kaieteura (Jenman) Labiak
- Lellingeria labiakii Sundue
- Lellingeria laxifolia A.R.Sm. & R.C.Moran
- Lellingeria longeattenuata D.M.Forero & J.Murillo
- Lellingeria longifolia Labiak
- Lellingeria major (Copel.) A.R.Sm. & R.C.Moran
- Lellingeria melanotrichia (Baker) A.R.Sm. & R.C.Moran
- Lellingeria micula (Lellinger) Labiak
- Lellingeria militaris (Maxon) A.R.Sm. & R.C.Moran
- Lellingeria moranii Labiak
- Lellingeria oreophila (Maxon) A.R.Sm. & R.C.Moran
- Lellingeria paramicola Labiak
- Lellingeria pendula (Sw.) A.R.Sm. & R.C.Moran
- Lellingeria pendulina A.R.Sm. & R.C.Moran
- Lellingeria phlegmaria (J.Sm.) A.R.Sm. & R.C.Moran
- Lellingeria pinnata A.Rojas
- Lellingeria pseudocapillaris (Rosenst.) A.R.Sm. & R.C.Moran
- Lellingeria pseudotenuicula Labiak
- Lellingeria simacensis (Rosenst.) A.R.Sm. & R.C.Moran
- Lellingeria sinuosa (A.R.Sm.) A.R.Sm. & R.C.Moran
- Lellingeria smithii Labiak
- Lellingeria subimpressa (Copel.) Labiak
- Lellingeria subsessilis (Baker) A.R.Sm. & R.C.Moran
- Lellingeria suprasculpta (Christ) A.R.Sm. & R.C.Moran
- Lellingeria suspensa (L.) A.R.Sm. & R.C.Moran
- Lellingeria tamandarei (Rosenst.) A.R.Sm. & R.C.Moran
- Lellingeria tenuicula (Fée) A.R.Sm. & R.C.Moran
- Lellingeria tmesipteris (Copel.) A.R.Sm. & R.C.Moran
- Lellingeria tunguraguae (Rosenst.) A.R.Sm. & R.C.Moran
- Lellingeria vargasiana A.Rojas
