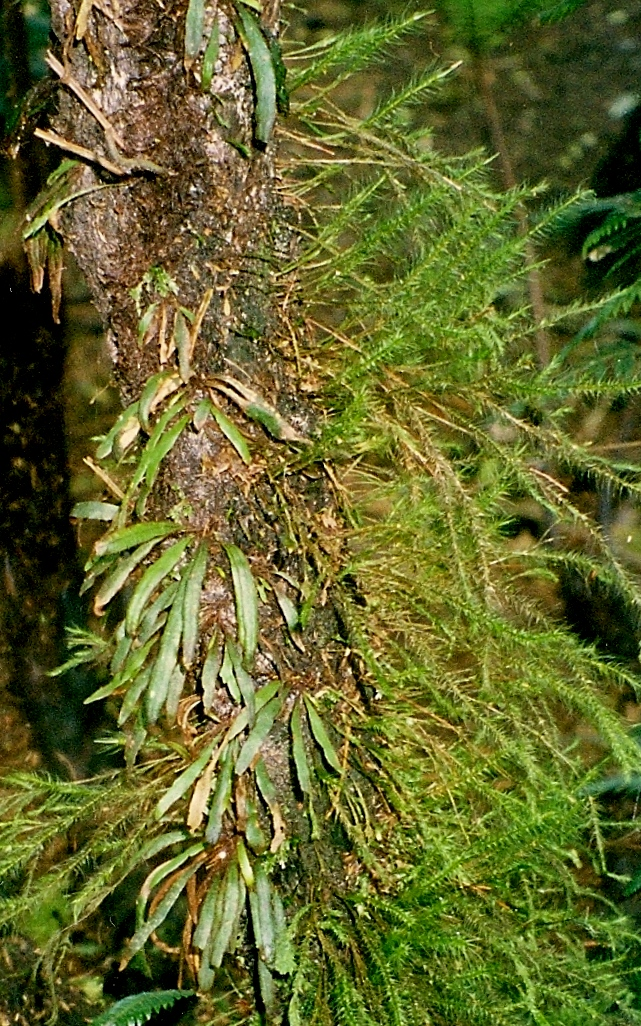

Scientific classification
- Kingdom: Plantae
- Clade: Tracheophytes
- Division: Polypodiophyta
- Class: Polypodiopsida
- Order: Polypodiales
- Suborder: Polypodiineae
- Family: Polypodiaceae
- Genus: Grammitis
- Species: G. wattsii

Binomial name
- Grammitis wattsii Copel.

= Grammitis wattsii =

Species of fern

Grammitis wattsii is a fern in the family Polypodiaceae. The specific epithet honours the Reverend W. W. Watts (1856–1920), a prominent Australian cryptogamist active in the late 19th and early 20th centuries.

== Description ==
The plant is an epiphytic fern. It has an erect or shortly creeping rhizome with dense, chestnut brown, narrow pointed scales. Its simple fronds combine a 0.5–5 cm long stipe with a narrowly elliptic-linear lamina 5–20 cm long and 0.4–1.2 cm wide.

== Distribution and habitat ==
The fern is endemic to Australia’s subtropical Lord Howe Island in the Tasman Sea; it is confined to the cloud forest on the upper slopes and summits of Mounts Lidgbird and Gower.
