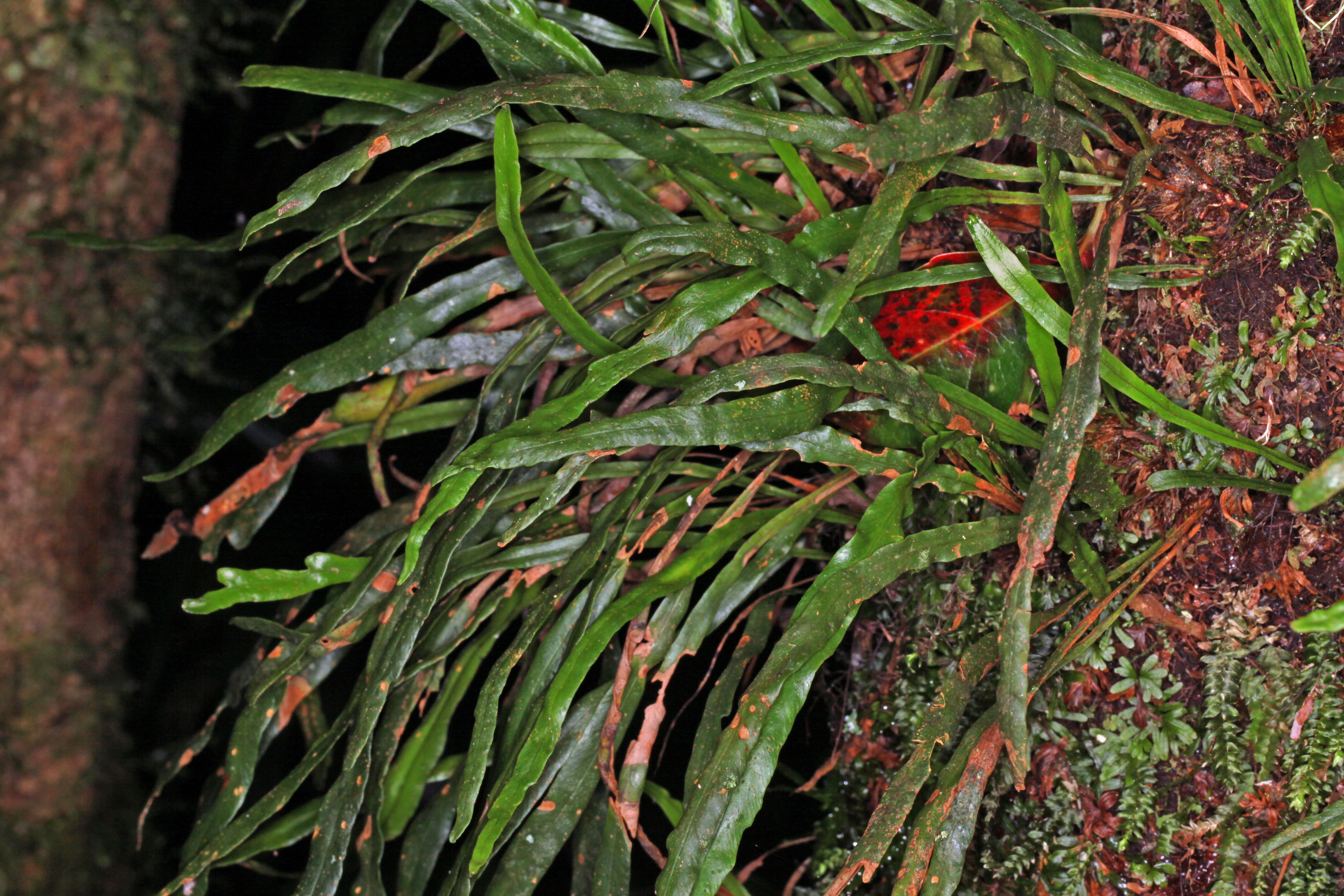

Scientific classification
- Kingdom: Plantae
- Clade: Tracheophytes
- Division: Polypodiophyta
- Class: Polypodiopsida
- Order: Polypodiales
- Suborder: Polypodiineae
- Family: Polypodiaceae
- Genus: Grammitis
- Species: G. diminuta

Binomial name
- Grammitis diminuta (Baker) Copel.

Synonyms
- Polypodium diminutum Baker

= Grammitis diminuta =

Species of plant

Grammitis diminuta is a fern in the family Polypodiaceae. The Latin specific epithet diminuta means "decreased" or "diminished", with reference to the tapered frond base.

== Description ==
The plant is an epiphytic fern. It has a stout, erect rhizome with light brown, lanceolate scales. Its simple fronds combine a short stipe with a narrowly elliptic lamina 3–15 cm long and 0.4–0.8 cm wide.

== Distribution and habitat ==
The fern is endemic to Australia’s subtropical Lord Howe Island in the Tasman Sea; it is confined to the cloud forest on the upper slopes and summits of Mounts Lidgbird and Gower.
