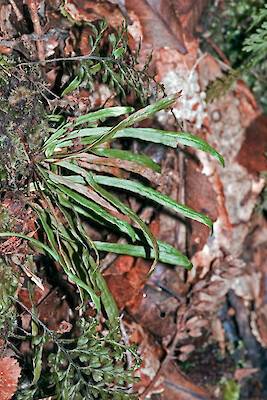
- Notogrammitis billardierei at Stokes Valley, Lower Hutt, New Zealand

Conservation status
- Least Concern (IUCN 3.1)

Scientific classification
- Kingdom: Plantae
- Clade: Tracheophytes
- Division: Polypodiophyta
- Class: Polypodiopsida
- Order: Polypodiales
- Suborder: Polypodiineae
- Family: Polypodiaceae
- Genus: Notogrammitis
- Species: N. billardierei

Binomial name
- Notogrammitis billardierei (Willdenow) Parris
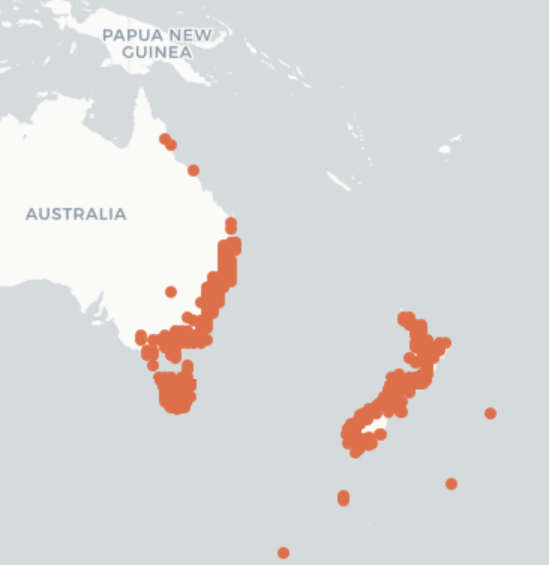
- Distribution map of Notogrammitis billardierei, courtesy of Atlas of Living Australia

Synonyms
- Grammitis billardierei Grammitis meridionalis

= Notogrammitis billardierei =

Species of fern

Notogrammitis billardierei, also known as the common finger-fern, or common strap fern, is a small epiphytic or lithophytic fern [1] with small, strap like fronds, found commonly in wet forest in South-Eastern Australia and New Zealand.

== Description ==
Notogrammitis billardierei is a small fern that typically grows on trunks, dead logs, and rocks [2]. It has leathery, dark green, narrow fronds. The fronds are 7–15 cm long, and 4–7 mm wide, with entire margins and obvious midveins. The sporangia are grouped into oblong sori rather than the more common circular sori, and these oblong sori are angled obliquely on either side of the midvein on the underside of each frond [3]. The fronds are unbranching but are crowded together, each originating from the rhizome [1].

Notogrammitis billardierei is of the division polypodiophyta, and thus does not produce flowers, cones, or seeds, instead reproducing sexually through spores.

== Taxonomy and naming ==
The genus, Notogrammitis, comes from the Greek word Noto meaning 'southern' and gramma meaning 'line'. Notogrammitis was previously categorised as a part of the genus Grammitis. The species, billardierei, was named in honour of Jacques Houttou de Labillardiere, a 19th-century French botanist. It was named by Carl Ludwig Willdenow, a German botanist.

== Habitat and distribution ==
Notogrammitis billardierei is widespread in rainforest and moist open forest in Tasmania, New Zealand, and the Eastern coast of Australia in Victoria, New South Wales, and Queensland [4].

It commonly grows on fallen trees and on tree ferns, but also grows on rocks and living trees. It requires moist, sheltered conditions to grow, making it much more frequent on South-East facing hillsides than North-west facing hillsides [6].

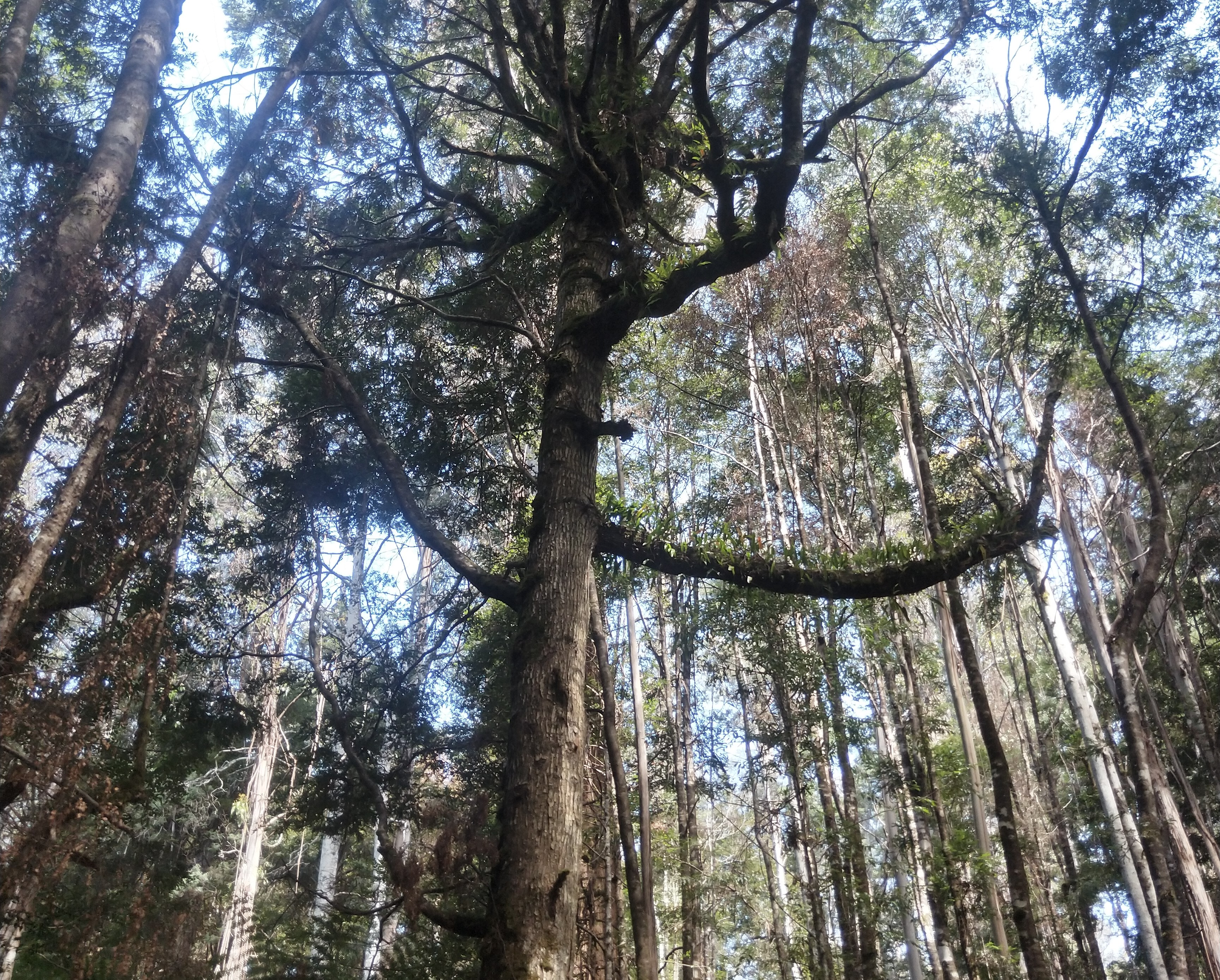
Notogrammitis billardierei growing epiphytically on Nothofagus cunninghamii in the Styx Valley, Tasmania

== Cultivation ==
Cultivation of Notogrammitis billardierei is limited as it is generally unavailable commercially, and its growing conditions are limited by its epiphytic nature [1]. For successful cultivation, it must be treated with delicacy and kept moist. The most common way to cultivate Notogrammitis billardierei is by mounting it epiphytically on a tree fern, such as Dicksonia antarctica.
