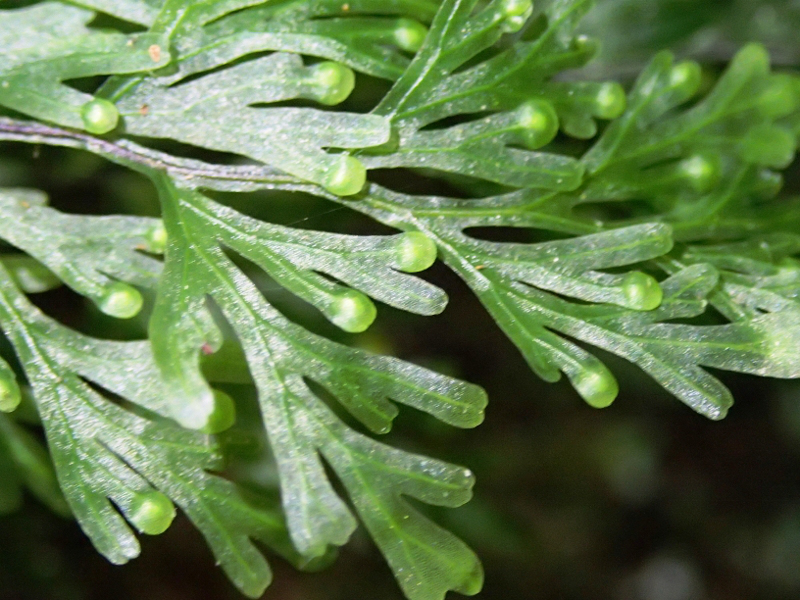
- Hymenophyllum flabellatum

Scientific classification
- Kingdom: Plantae
- Clade: Tracheophytes
- Division: Polypodiophyta
- Class: Polypodiopsida
- Order: Hymenophyllales
- Family: Hymenophyllaceae
- Genus: Hymenophyllum
- Species: H. flabellatum

Binomial name
- Hymenophyllum flabellatum Labill

Synonyms
- Mecodium flabellatum

= Hymenophyllum flabellatum =

Species of plant

Hymenophyllum flabellatum (Hymen-O-FIL-lum Flab-bel-Lah-tum), the shiny filmy-fern, is a species of fern in the family Hymenophyllaceae. This delicate fern is commonly epiphytic and is between 5 and 25 cm in length. It is distinct, with its thin, one-celled thick, membranous leaves. It is from the family Hymenophyllaceae and is dispersed world wide. The species is dispersed highly throughout Tasmanian rainforests and in the south east of mainland Australia, (Victoria and New South Wales) with small pockets of the population seen in northern Queensland.

The name Hymenophyllum comes from the Greek words hymen (membrane) and phyllon (leaf). Flabellatum comes from Latin flabellatus, meaning "fan-shaped".

== Description ==
The filmy-fern is distinct by its thin, one cell thick, membranous fronds, that grow in moist areas. Fronds are pale yellow green, covered in yellow-brown hairs, and 5–25 cm in length. Linear with entire margins, terminal on short lateral segments, with one singular vein in lateral segment; Sori numerous and present at tips of lateral segments (see image below); indusium two lipped, slightly wider than segment; fronds usually distant and often pendant.

Stomata are absent. Lamina is 2-3 pinnate, ovate to linear, and yellow green; pinnae sometimes with long terminal segments commonly referred to as "tailed", narrowly rhomboidal, to fan-shaped; stipe slender and not winged, with tuft of hairs at base; rachis bearing scattered hairs, winged towards upper parts; receptical short and enclosed.

== Habitat and distribution ==
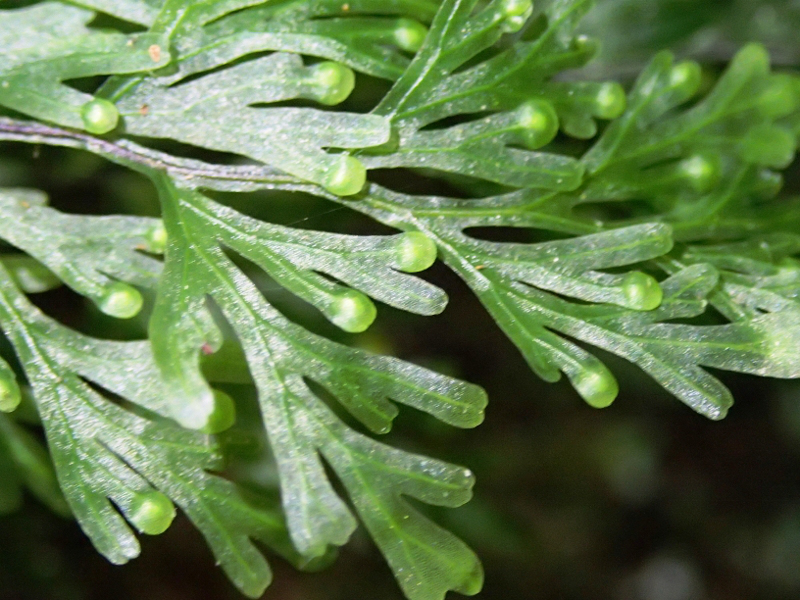
Hymenophyllum flabellatum showing sori at tips of lateral segments.

The shiny filmy-fern is found in rainforests, forming mats on rocks and tree trunks, and even forming curtains in well-lit caves. It is highly dispersed throughout Tasmanian rainforests, and also occurs on Flinders Island, as well as in New South Wales, Victoria and some areas in northern Queensland. The species also highly dispersed throughout New Zealand. Rainforests tend to reside fairly close to coastal areas (due to the need for precipitation) and as a result the shiny filmy-fern tends to not occur inland Tasmania or mainland Australia.

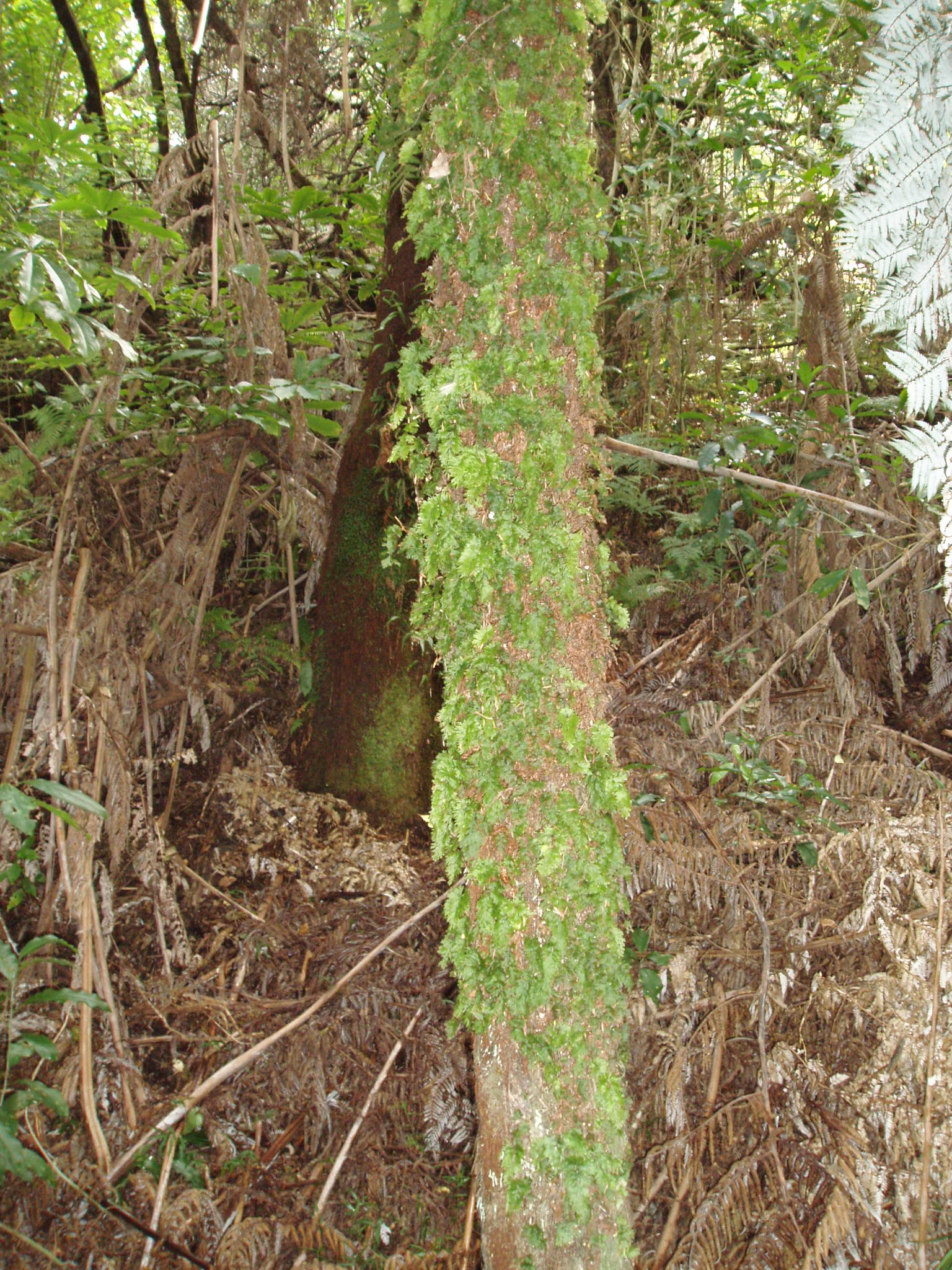
Hymenophyllum flabellatum growing epiphytical on a tree.

== Taxonomy and evolution ==
The family Hymenophyllaceae is a major and successful family under the division of Pteridophytes (ferns and fern allies). It is known as the filmy fern family and is successful, with about 670-700 species named, but there is debate over the amount species defined. 131 are accepted names.

The family is believed to be primitive under evolutionary terms and is divided into two genera, Hymenophyllum and Trichomanes. Groups are separated based on the gametophyte and sorus structure, particularly the structure of the indsium (membrane covering sorus) and receptacle.

The family is dispersed world wide, and mostly grows in tropical regions, as well as subtropical and temperate regions in the Southern Hemisphere.

Members from the genus Hymenophyllum are all small, thin and delicate. They are either epiphytic plants or rock plants, forming dense mats along rainforest floors. Generally members of this family must reside in moist conditions, and therefore tropical or rainforest regions, but few members can withstand dryer conditions, curling up and later 'reviving' when moisture becomes available.
