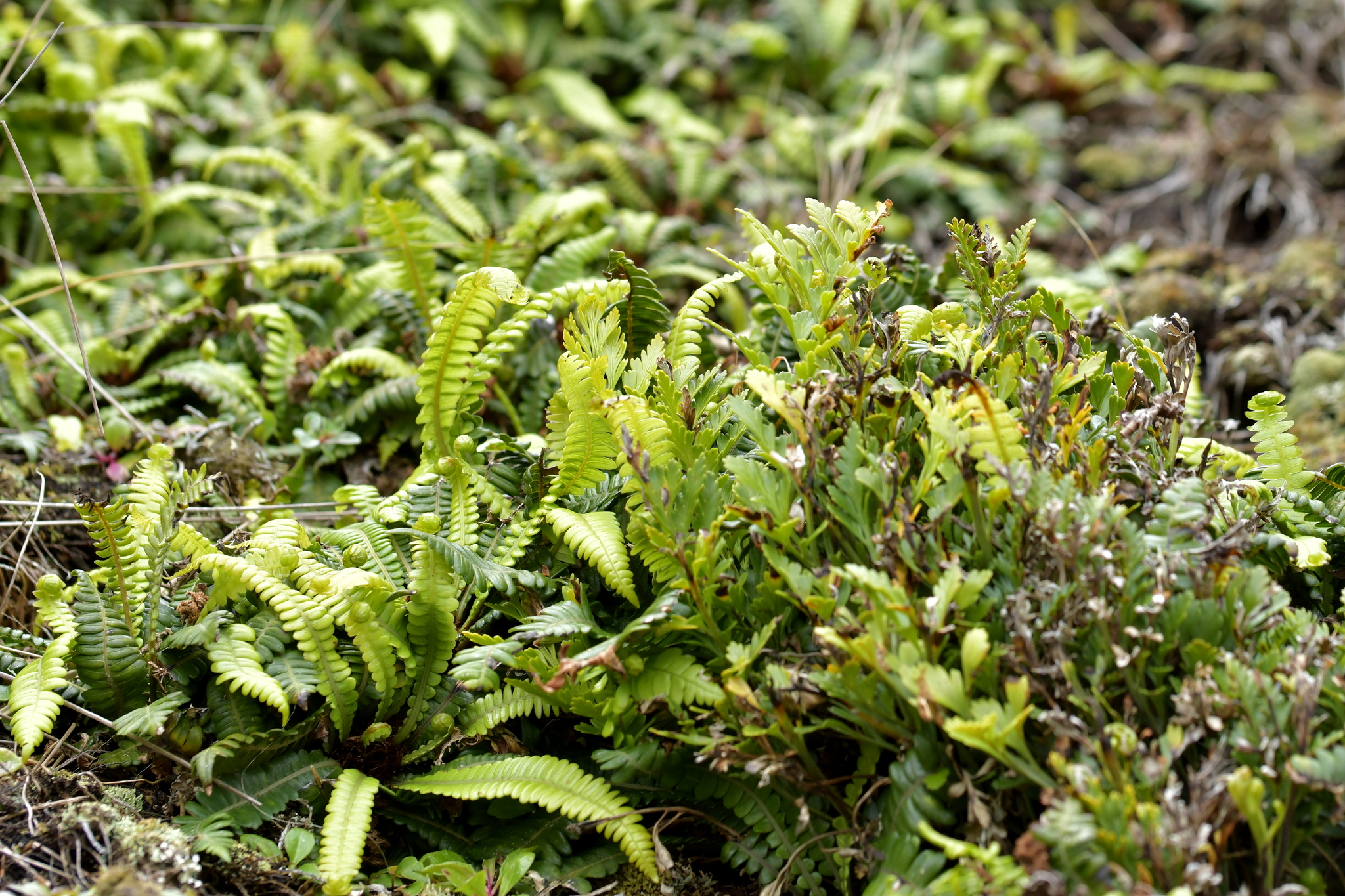

Conservation status
- Naturally Uncommon (NZ TCS)

Scientific classification
- Kingdom: Plantae
- Clade: Tracheophytes
- Division: Polypodiophyta
- Class: Polypodiopsida
- Order: Polypodiales
- Suborder: Aspleniineae
- Family: Aspleniaceae
- Genus: Asplenium
- Species: A. chathamense

Binomial name
- Asplenium chathamense Brownsey, 1985

= Asplenium chathamense =

Species of fern in the spleenwort family

Asplenium chathamense, also called Chatham Island spleenwort, is a species of spleenwort in the fern family Aspleniaceae. It is endemic and found near coasts on the Chatham Islands. The species was described in 1985 by Patrick Brownsey. It is categorized as "naturally uncommon" in the New Zealand Threat Classification System.
