= Tasmanian temperate rainforests =

Terrestrial ecoregion in Tasmania, Australia

Tasmanian temperate rain forests
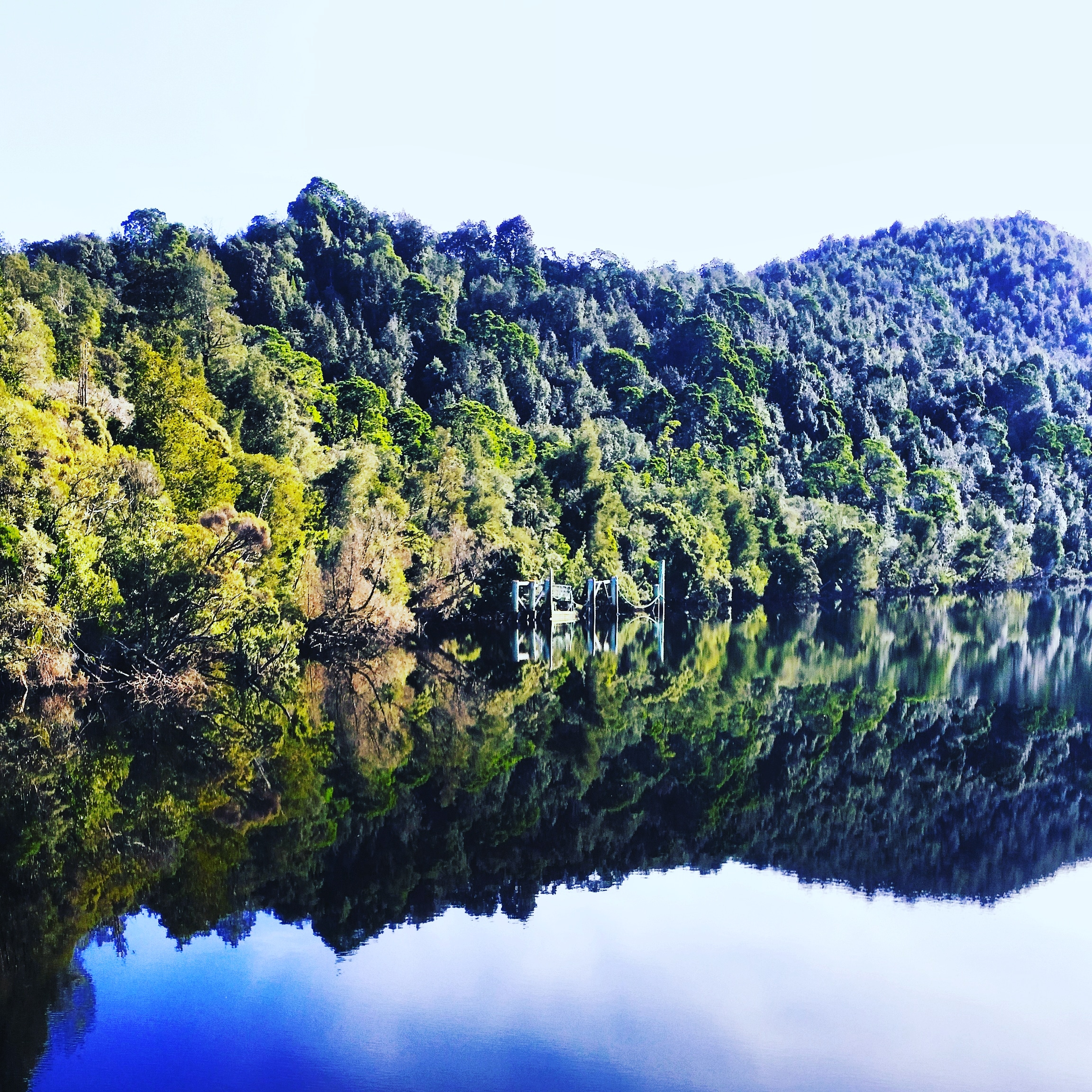
- Lower Gordon River, Tasmania

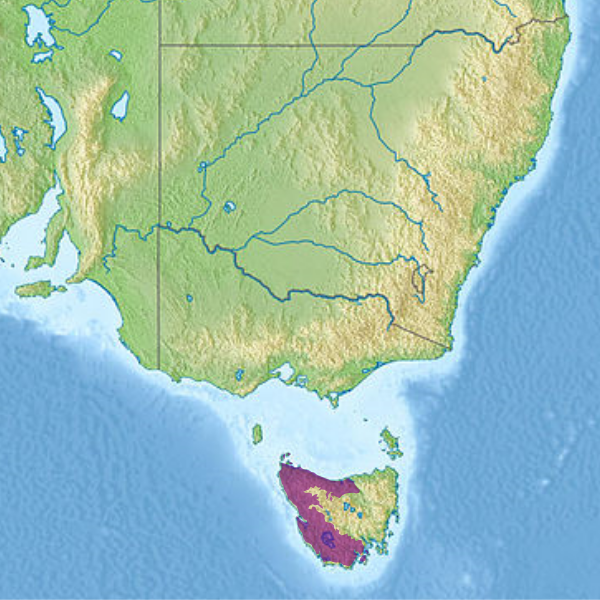
- Ecoregion territory (in purple)

Ecology
- Realm: Australasian
- Biome: temperate broadleaf and mixed forests
- Borders: Tasmanian Central Highlands forests; Tasmanian temperate forests

Geography
- Area: 31,340 km^{2} (12,100 mi^{2})
- Country: Australia
- States: Tasmania
- Coordinates: 42.9°S 146°E

Conservation
- Conservation status: Vulnerable
- Protected: 16,649 km² (50%)

The Tasmanian temperate rain forests are a temperate broadleaf and mixed forests ecoregion in western Tasmania. The ecoregion is part of the Australasian realm, which includes Tasmania and Australia, New Zealand, New Guinea, New Caledonia, and adjacent islands.

Rainforest communities in Australia are classified as closed forests in which the canopy comprises 70–100% cover. It can be divided into tropical, subtropical, monsoon and temperate rainforest. Tasmanian rainforest is classified as cool temperate rainforest, and represents the most floristically complex and best developed form of this forest type in Australia. In Tasmania, they can be found in the West, Savage River National Park, South West, North East and in patches on the East Coast. On the mainland of Australia, cool temperate rainforest have a wide variety of woodland trees, but Tasmania only has a limited number of woodland and vascular plants such as mosses, liverworts, lichen and fungi. Because of this, the definition of Tasmanian cool temperate rainforest was redefined in the 1980s to allow for communities that did not meet the canopy requirements and clearly separate cool temperate rainforest from mixed forest; The current definition states that cool temperate rainforests are those with trees usually greater than 8 m (26 ft) in height and capable of regenerating in the absence of large scale catastrophic events, such as fire. These forests are climax vegetation and are dominated by angiosperms such as Nothofagus cunninghamii (myrtle beech), Atherosperma moschatum (sassafras), and Eucryphia lucida (leatherwood) as well as gymnosperms such as Athrotaxis selaginoides (King Billy Pine), Lagarostrobos franklinii (Huon or Macquarie pine) and Phyllocladus aspleniifolius (celery-top pine). The limited number of woody species is thought to be due to repeated glaciation.

Tasmanian cool temperate rainforest can be divided into four types: Callidendrous rainforest, Thamnic rainforest, Implicate rainforest and Open Montane. These four major types differ in many of their characteristics such as structure, floristics, distribution, level of endemism and ecology.

== Community composition and descriptions ==
The Tasmanian cool temperate rainforest is composed of two alliances, the myrtle-beech (Nothofagus cunninghamii) alliance and the pencil pine (Athrotaxis cupressoides) alliance. The former is made up of callidendrous, thamnic and implicate, whilst the latter is all open montane.

=== Callidendrous rainforest ===
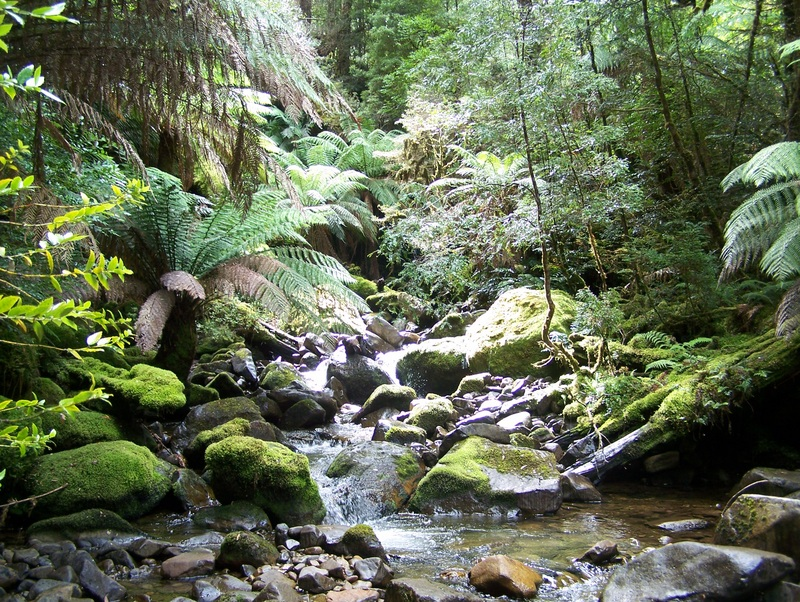
Callidendrous forest at streams edge at Growling Swallet

This is the simplest rainforest community in Tasmania; it is typically represented by medium to tall forests dominated by Nothofagus cunninghamii and/or Atherosperma moschatum, often together with Leptospermum lanigerum (woolly tea-tree) or Acacia melanoxylon (Australian blackwood). Typically, these forests are at least 40 m (130 ft) in height. Trees are usually well formed and widely spaced, and the understorey is open and often described as park-like. The diversity of woody species is low, and they are usually sparse and inconspicuous throughout the understorey. However, at mid to low elevations, the understorey may contain a few small trees or shrubs such as Olearia argophylla (musktree), Pimelea drupacea (cherry riceflower), Pittosporum bicolor (cheesewood), Aristotelia peduncularis (heart berry) and Coprosma quadrifida.

Fern diversity is high in many areas, and in these areas, epiphytes often flourish. The dominant tree ferns are commonly Dicksonia antarctica (soft tree fern) and/or Polystichum poliferum (mother shield fern). Common epiphyte species include Rumohra adiantiformis (leathery shieldfern or iron fern), Asplenium gracillimum (mother spleenwort), Asplenium terrestre, Microsorum diversifolium (kangaroo fern)," Hymenophyllum flabellatum (shiny filmy-fern), Hymenophyllum australe (austral filmy-fern), Hymenophyllum cupressiforme, and Polyphlebium venosum (veined bristle-fern). Histiopteris incisa (bat's wing fern) and Hypolepis rugosula (ruddy ground-fern) occur in disturbed sites such as along roads where there have been breaks in the canopy.

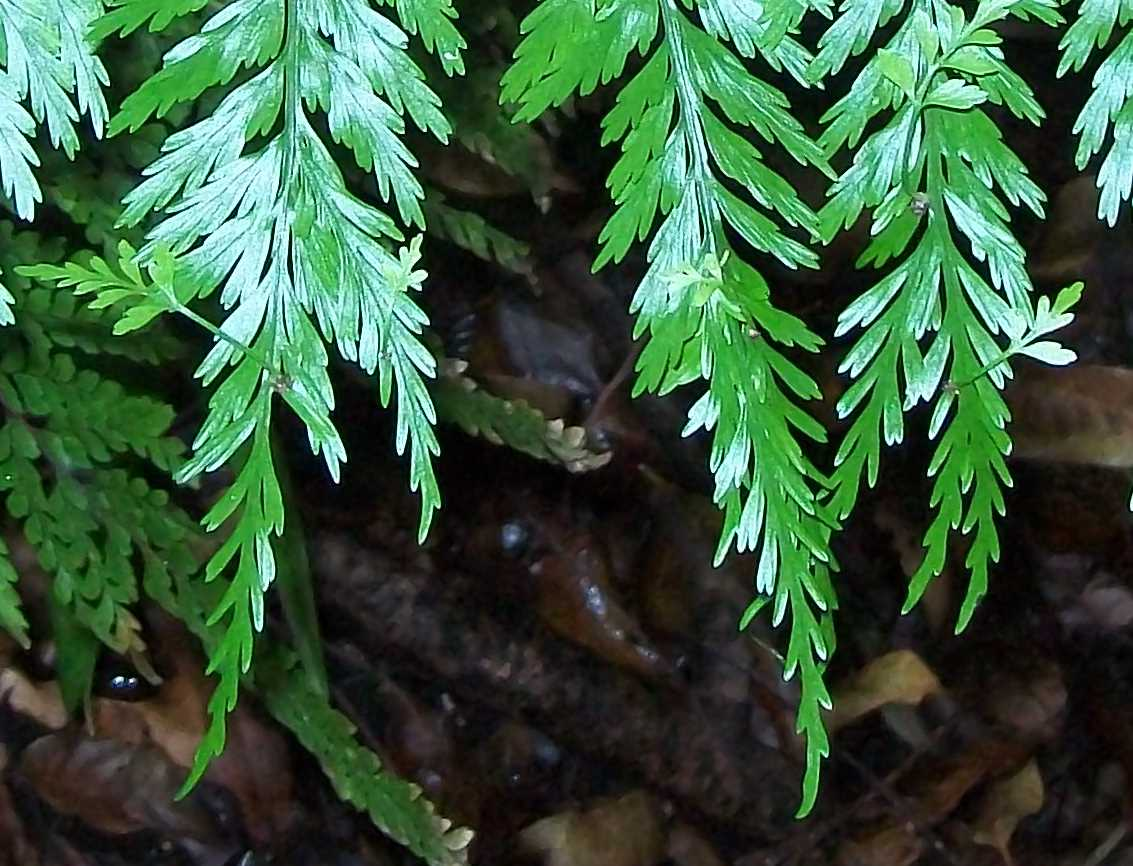
New plantlets forming at the end of the fronds of the Mother spleenwort

As elevation increases, the height of the forest decreases, Nothofagus cunninghamii becomes multi-stemmed, develops crooked leaning stems and abundant epiphytic bryophytes, and lichens produce a patterned effect on the trunks. The typical understorey becomes dominated by Tasmannia lanceolata (mountain pepper) and Telopea truncata (Tasmanian waratah), and the ground layer becomes host to Oxalis megellancia and Lagenophora stipitata (blue bottle-daisy). The pteridophyte diversity decreases and only small species such as Lycopodium fastigiatum (alpine club moss), Hymenophyllum peltatum, Grammitis billardierei (common finger-fern) and Blechnum penna-marina (Antarctic hard-fern) persist.

Callidendrous rainforests occurs in the eastern half of the state and in northwestern and central Tasmania.

Species found	% Cover	Type/form
Atherosperma moschatum	>75	Dominant spp
Histiopteris insica	1	Understorey
Dicksonia antarctica	5	Understorey
Chiloglottis cornuta	1	scattered
Corybas diemenicus	1	scattered
Clematis aristata	1	scattered
Comprosma quadrifida	1	scattered
Hymenophyllum australia	1	scattered

Table 1 Lyrebird nature walk, Mt Feild, Tasmania: species composition and structure of a mixed Callidendrous and Thamnic rainforest community; Height ~20 m (66 ft), 90% of ground litter cover, 5% rock and 5% bare ground.

=== Thamnic rainforest ===
Thamnic rainforests are characterised by well-formed trees of medium height, well below 40 m (130 ft), and a distinct shrub layer. The canopy is typically dominated by a mixture of 2–5 species, including Nothofagus cunninghamii, Eucryphia lucida, Atherosperma moschatum, Lagarostrobos franklinii, Eucryphia milliganii (dwarf leatherwood), Phyllocladus aspleniifolius (celery-top pine), Athrotaxis selaginoides and, rarely, Nothofagus gunnii (tanglefoot-beech).

The shrub layer is more prominent and has an increased diversity of woody trees. Common species are: Anopterus glandulosus (Tasmanian laurel), Anodopetalum biglandulosum, Acradenia frankliniae (whitey-wood or wirewood), Archeria hirtella, Archeria eriocarpa, Cenarrhenes nitida (native plum), Trochocarpa cunninghamii, Trochocarpa gunnii (sweet-scented trochocarpa), Orites diversifolia (silkwood), Prionotes cerinthoides (climbing heath), Richea pandanifolia (pandani or giant grass tree) and, at high elevations, Richea scoparia (honey richea). The increase in understorey shrub is due to the larger number of gaps in the canopy, and the differing light requirements of competing species. Fern diversity decreases, as a result, because of the decrease in light from the understorey. Parablechnum wattsii (hard water fern) is the main ground fern; it prefers damp shaded areas and forms a very dense layer in some areas but can be absent in others. Small epiphytes are widespread, these include Hymenophyllum rarum (a filmy fern) and Grammitis billardierei. Apteropteris applanata can occur in areas containing Athrotaxis. Other larger epiphytes are usually present, but they are rarely prominent. At higher elevations, the general appearance resembles that of a callidenderous rainforest, but the floristic differences remain the same.

Thamnic rainforests occur mostly in western and southwestern Tasmania.

Species	% cover	Type/form
Blechnum nudum	1	ground cover
Anodopetalum bilandulosum	>75	Understorey
Anopteris glandulosa	>50	Understorey
Nothofagus cunninghamii	>75	Dominant
Atherosperma moschatum	>75	Dominant
Eucryphia lucida	20	Understorey
Phyllocladus asplenifolius	5	shrublayer

Table 2: The Creepy Crawly Nature Walk, Mt Field, Tasmania: Species composition in Thamnic rainforest community; Height ~35 m (115 ft), 95% of ground leaf cover, scattered rock and bare ground.

=== Implicate rainforest ===
Low in stature, broken uneven canopies, height reduced below 20m. Dominance is usually shared between several species: Nothofagus cunninghamii, Nothofagus gunnii, Eucryphia lucida, Atherosperma moschatum, Lagarostrobos franklinii, Eucryphia milliganii, Phyllocladus aspleniifolius, Athrotaxis selaginoides, Diselma archeri, Leptospermum scoparium, Leptospermum glaucescens, Leptospermum nitidum, Leptospermum lanigerum, Acacia mucronata and Melaleuca squarrosa. Atherosperma moschatum is usually represented by small diameter depauperate plants. Understorey is tangled and barely distinguishable from the canopy layer. It can from a continuous layer from the ground to the canopy but some scattered emergents can occur. Species diversity is high for trees and shrubs in this community, but very low for ferns. Anopterus glandulosus, Anodopetalum biglandulosum, Cenarrhenes nitida, Telopea truncata, Agastachys odorata, Comprosma nitida, Archeria eriocarpa, Archeria serpyllifolia, Archeria hirtella, Olearia persoonioides, Trochocarpa cunninghamii, Trochocarpa gunnii, Richea pandanifolia, Richea scoparia, Dracophyllum milliganii and Prionotes cerinthoides are all typical shrubs or small trees that comprise these communities. The ferns are dominated by Parablechnum wattsii but small epiphytes do prevail: Hymenophyllum rarum, Hymenophyllum marginatum, Grammitis billardierei and Apteropteris applanata occurs in communities where Athrotaxis are present. – occur mostly in western and southwestern Tasmania.

=== Open montane rainforest ===
Low and dominated by Athrotaxis cupressoides or Athrotaxis selaginoides (less commonly). Open canopy, widely spaced trees allow bright light to penetrate the lower levels of the forest. In some communities, the canopy can be dense and instead resemble a high-elevation callidendrous forest. Understorey may be dominated by either Poa (grasses) or Sphagnum (mosses) or commonly, low shrubs that are less than half the height of the forest. There is a high diversity of woody species but a low diversity of ferns. Multiple species from nearby treeless vegetation are present, but their classification as rainforest species is yet to be confirmed. Understorey shrubs include: Nothofagus cunninghamii, Nothofagus gunnii, Diselma archeri, Podocarpus lawrencei, Richea pandanifolia, Richea scoparia, Richea sprengelioides, Orites acicularis, Orites revoluta, Microstobos niphophilus, Tasmannia lanceolata, Epacris serpyllifolia and Baeckea gunniana. Ferns are usually poorly developed with larger ground species absent or confined to rocks, Gleichenia alpina is the exception to this observation. Small species such as Hymenophyllum peltatum and Apteropteris applanata can sometimes make an appearance. – occur on the Central Plateau but can extend as small outliners to the mountains further south.

== Biological factors ==
Geology and soils are important factors in Tasmanian ecology. Callidendrous forests require good-quality sites where fertile soils occur over rocks such as basalt, dolerite and the more nutrient-rich granites. Implicate forests are at the other extreme, and mostly grow in organic soils or mineral soils derived from nutrient-poor rock types such as quartzites and silicous conglomerates. Thamnic forests tend to prefer an intermediate substrate. With the exception of open montane forests, elevation seems to have little effect on the floristic differences between community types.

== Conservation ==
In 1982, the United Nations Educational, Scientific and Cultural Organization (UNESCO) designated the northern portion of the ecoregion a World Heritage Site.

== Protected areas ==
Protected areas in the ecoregion include:

- Franklin-Gordon Wild Rivers National Park
- Hartz Mountains National Park
- Meredith Range Regional Reserve
- Mount Dundas Regional Reserve
- Narawntapu National Park
- Savage River National Park
- Southwest National Park
- West Coast Range Regional Reserve
