= Archeria =

Archeria can refer to two very different taxonomic genera:

- Archeria (animal), a genus of extinct eel like animals
- Archeria (plant), a genus of shrubs in the heath family
