= APCA =

APCA may refer to:

- Advanced Perceptual Contrast Algorithm
- Agrupación de Comandos Anfibios (Amphibious Commandos Group), a special operations force of the Argentine Marine Corps
- Arthur – Pieman Conservation Area, in Tasmania, Australia
- Associação Paulista de Críticos de Arte, arts award organization based in São Paulo, Brazil
- Australian Payments Clearing Association
