= Prasophyllum favonium =

Western leek orchid

Conservation status
- Critically endangered (EPBC Act)

Scientific classification
- Kingdom: Plantae
- Clade: Tracheophytes
- Clade: Angiosperms
- Clade: Monocots
- Order: Asparagales
- Family: Orchidaceae
- Subfamily: Orchidoideae
- Tribe: Diurideae
- Subtribe: Prasophyllinae
- Genus: Prasophyllum
- Species: P. favonium

Binomial name
- Prasophyllum favonium D.L.Jones

Species of orchid

Prasophyllum favonium, commonly known as the western leek orchid, is a species of orchid endemic to Tasmania. It has a single tubular leaf with a reddish base and between five and fifteen brownish flowers with a dark purple labellum. In 2000, the entire population was estimated to be less than forty mature plants in a very small area.

== Description ==
Prasophyllum favonium is a terrestrial, perennial, deciduous, herb with an underground tuber and a single tube-shaped leaf which is 120–280 mm (5–10 in) long and 2–3 mm (0.08–0.1 in) wide with a reddish base. The free part of the leaf is 60–130 mm (2–5 in) long. Between five and fifteen flowers are crowded along a thin flowering spike 30–70 mm (1–3 in) long. The flowers are brownish, 11–13 mm (0.4–0.5 in) long and 5–6 mm (0.20–0.24 in) wide with a dark purple labellum. As with others in the genus, the flowers are inverted so that the labellum is above the column rather than below it. The dorsal sepal is lance-shaped to narrow egg-shaped, 5–7 mm (0.2–0.3 in) long and about 3 mm (0.1 in) wide and brownish with darker lines. The lateral sepals are linear to narrow lance-shaped 7–8 mm (0.28–0.31 in) long, about 2 mm (0.08 in) wide, erect and free from each other. The petals are linear to oblong, 5–6 mm (0.20–0.24 in) long and about 1.5 mm (0.06 in) wide. The labellum is dark purplish, about 5 mm (0.2 in) long and 3 mm (0.1 in) wide, turns upwards at about 90° near its middle, and has wavy edges. Flowering occurs in October and November.

== Taxonomy and naming ==
Prasophyllum favonium was first formally described in 1998 by David Jones and the description was published in Australian Orchid Research. The specific epithet (favonium) is a Latin word meaning "west wind", referring to the cold westerly winds which occur frequently in this orchid's habitat.

== Distribution and habitat ==
The western leek orchid grows among shrubs in windswept, dense low heathland. It is found in five small areas in the Arthur-Pieman Conservation Area.

== Conservation ==
Prasophyllum favonium is classified as Endangered under the Tasmanian Threatened Species Protection Act 1995 and as Critically Endangered under the Commonwealth Government Environment Protection and Biodiversity Conservation Act 1999 (EPBC) Act. The main threats to the species are land clearing, digging by animals, inappropriate fire regimes and trampling by grazing animals.
