= Pterostylis rubenachii =

Arthur River greenhood

Conservation status
- Endangered (EPBC Act)

Scientific classification
- Kingdom: Plantae
- Clade: Tracheophytes
- Clade: Angiosperms
- Clade: Monocots
- Order: Asparagales
- Family: Orchidaceae
- Subfamily: Orchidoideae
- Tribe: Cranichideae
- Genus: Pterostylis
- Species: P. rubenachii

Binomial name
- Pterostylis rubenachii D.L.Jones

Synonyms
- Oligochaetochilus rubenachii (D.L.Jones) Szlach.; Hymenochilus rubenachii (D.L.Jones) D.L.Jones & M.A.Clem.

Species of orchid

Pterostylis rubenachii, commonly known as the Arthur River greenhood, is a plant in the orchid family Orchidaceae and is endemic to Tasmania. Both flowering and non-flowering plants have a rosette of leaves lying flat on the ground and flowering plants have up to seven crowded, transparent green flowers with darker green stripes.

== Description ==
Pterostylis rubenachii, is a terrestrial, perennial, deciduous, herb with an underground tuber. It has a rosette of between four and six, elliptic to egg-shaped leaves, each leaf 15–20 mm (0.6–0.8 in) long and 6–10 mm (0.2–0.4 in) wide, lying flat on the ground. Between two and seven transparent green flowers with darker green stripes are crowded together on a flowering spike 30–80 mm (1–3 in) high with two or three stem leaves with their bases wrapped around it. The flowers are 8–9 mm (0.3–0.4 in) long and about 5 mm (0.2 in) wide. The dorsal sepal and petals are joined to form a hood called the "galea" over the column. The dorsal sepal is gently curved but suddenly curves downward near the tip and is about the same length as the petals. The lateral sepals turn downwards and are about 6 mm (0.2 in) long, 5 mm (0.2 in) wide and fused together forming a cup with tips about 1 mm (0.04 in) long. The labellum is about 3 mm (0.1 in) long, 2 mm (0.08 in) wide and whitish-green with a dark green, appendage. Flowering occurs in October and November.

== Taxonomy and naming ==
Pterostylis rubenachii was first formally described in 1998 by David Jones from a specimen collected in 1837 and the description was published in Australian Orchid Research. The specific epithet (rubenachii) honours Les Rubenach who is one of the few people to have found this species.

== Distribution and habitat ==
The Arthur River greenhood grows in moist heath at altitudes of 10–30 m (30–100 ft) in the Arthur River area.

== Conservation ==
Pterostylis rubenachii is listed as "endangered" under the Australian Government Environment Protection and Biodiversity Conservation Act 1999 and the Tasmanian Government Threatened Species Protection Act 1995. Only about 800 plants of this species survive, mostly in the Arthur-Pieman Conservation Area. It is threatened by weed invasion, cattle grazing and off-road vehicles.
