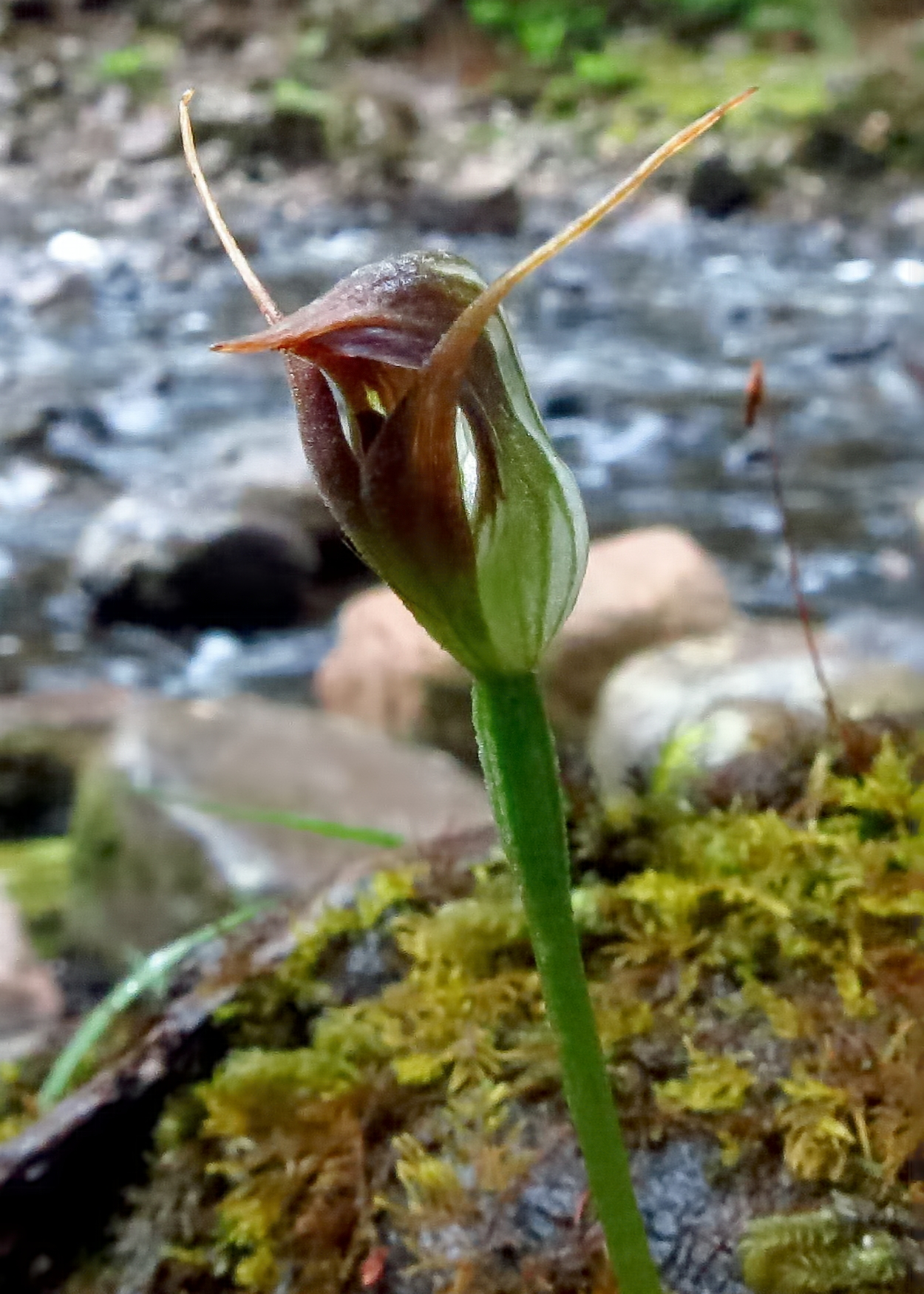
- In the Tarkine

Scientific classification
- Kingdom: Plantae
- Clade: Embryophytes
- Clade: Tracheophytes
- Clade: Spermatophytes
- Clade: Angiosperms
- Clade: Monocots
- Order: Asparagales
- Family: Orchidaceae
- Subfamily: Orchidoideae
- Tribe: Cranichideae
- Genus: Pterostylis
- Species: P. pedunculata

Binomial name
- Pterostylis pedunculata R.Br.

Synonyms
- Pterostylis semirubra F.Muell.

= Pterostylis pedunculata =

Maroonhood

Species of orchid

Pterostylis pedunculata, commonly known as the upright maroonhood or maroonhood, is a species of orchid endemic to south-eastern Australia. Flowering plants have a rosette of two to six stalked leaves and a single green flower which is white near its base and tinged with reddish brown to black and with a gap between the petals and lateral sepals. It is common and widespread in a range of habitats.

== Description ==
Pterostylis pedunculata is a terrestrial, perennial, deciduous, herb with an underground tuber. Flowering plants have a rosette of between two and six stalked leaves, each leaf 10–65 mm long and 5–20 mm wide. A single flower 15–20 mm long and 5–7 mm wide is borne on a spike 60–250 mm high. The flowers are green, white near the base with reddish-brown to black tinges near the tip. The dorsal sepal and petals are fused, forming a hood or "galea" over the column but the dorsal sepal is slightly longer than the petals and has a sharp point on its end. There is a gap between the petals and the lateral sepals, which have thread-like tips 16–30 mm long. The sinus between the lateral sepals has a deep, V-shaped notch in the centre. The labellum is 5–7 mm long, about 3 mm wide, reddish-brown, egg-shaped, straight and just visible above the sinus. Flowering occurs from July to November.

== Taxonomy and naming ==
Pterostylis pedunculata was first formally described in 1810 by Robert Brown and the description was published in the Prodromus Florae Novae Hollandiae et Insulae Van Diemen. The specific epithet (pedunculata) means pedunculate.

== Distribution and habitat ==
The maroonhood is widespread and common in moist, sheltered places in forest but also grows in coastal scrub. It is found from south-eastern Queensland to south-eastern South Australia and to Tasmania. In New South Wales it mostly occurs in coastal and near-coastal districts but extends as far inland as the Australian Capital Territory.
