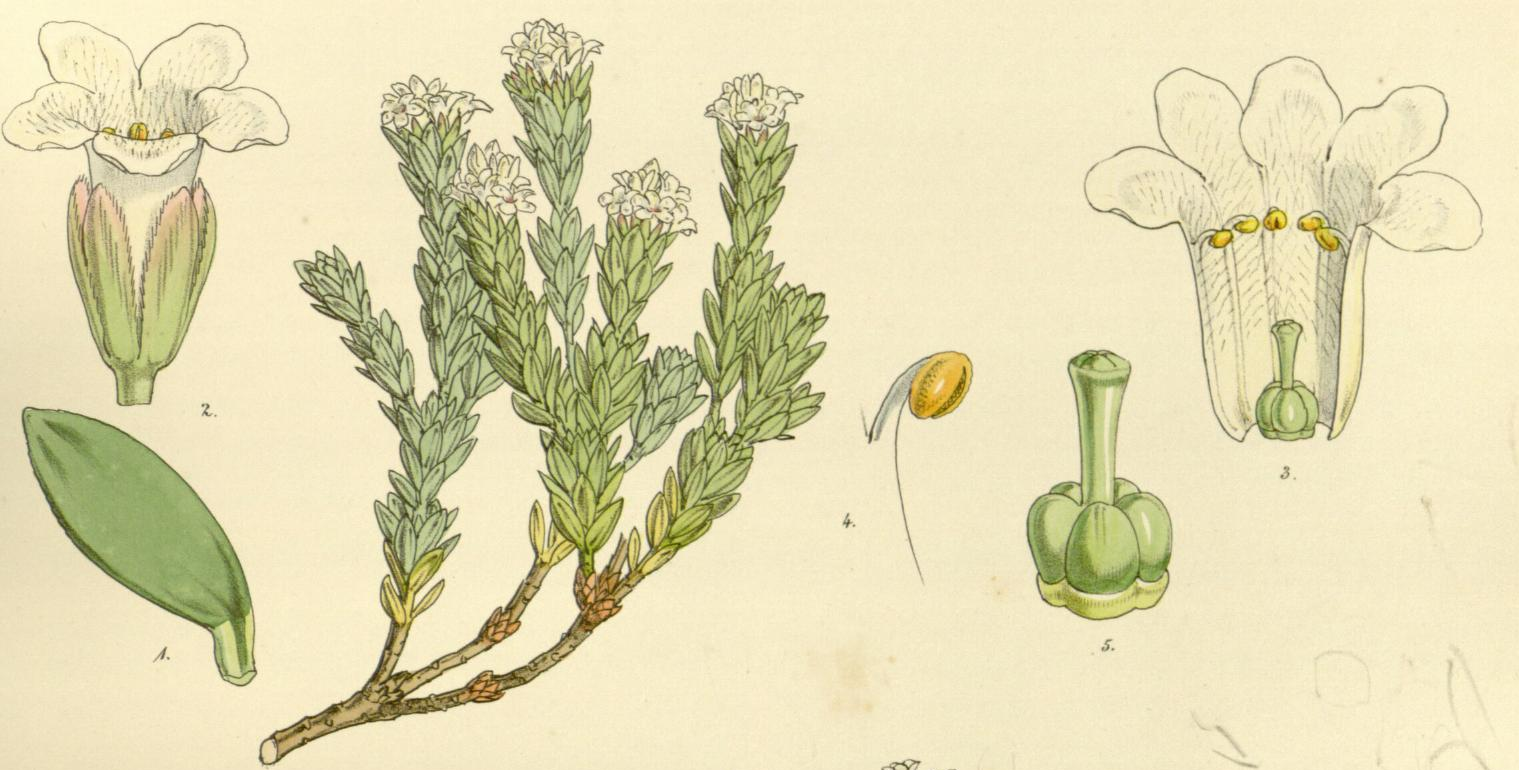

Scientific classification
- Kingdom: Plantae
- Clade: Tracheophytes
- Clade: Angiosperms
- Clade: Eudicots
- Clade: Asterids
- Order: Ericales
- Family: Ericaceae
- Genus: Archeria
- Species: A. serpyllifolia

Binomial name
- Archeria serpyllifolia Hooker J.D.

= Archeria serpyllifolia =

Species of flowering plant

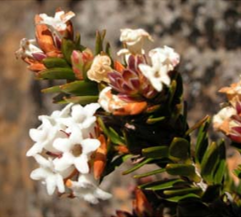
Archeria serpyllifolia flower, Greg Jordan, 2019, University of Tasmania, Key to Tasmanian Vascular Plants

Archeria serpyllifolia is a dense, compact, low growing shrub, that is endemic to Tasmania, Australia, inhabiting the undisturbed alpine areas of southern and south-west Tasmania. This plant is commonly referred to by Australasian naturalists as thyme archeria.

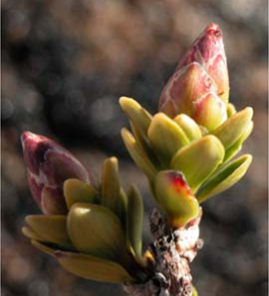
Archeria serpyllifolia bud, Greg Jordan, 2019, University of Tasmania, Key to Tasmanian Vascular Plants

== Description ==
The Archeria genus is a part of the Ericaceae family, a family of flowering plants that is commonly referred to as the heath family. Archeria serpyllifolia is one of six species under the Archeria genus. This shrub is characteristically woody and rigid, ranging from approximately 15–25 cm in height, and exhibiting fasciculate, ascending branches, that are somewhat glabrous in appearance. The leaves have a high resemblance to those of Epacris serpyllifolia, which are small (up to 5 mm long), suberect, elliptical-ovate in shape, very thick and coriaceous and exhibit a minutely serrate edge. Leaves also display a few veins on their light green under surface and are generally blunter than those of the similar species Archeria comberi, which also differs in having solitary flowers. The flowers are crowded on a short, erect terminal, with six to eight flowered racemes. The peduncles bracteate at the base, and pedicels have one bracteole at their insertion.

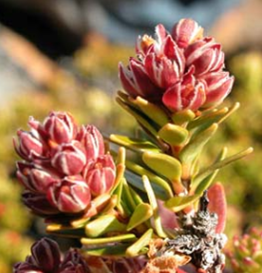
Archeria serpyllifolia fruiting, Greg Jordan, 2019, University of Tasmania, Key to Tasmanian Vascular Plants

== Habitat and Distribution ==
Archeria serpyllifolia is endemic to south-western Tasmania. It is largely found on acidic soils and grows in montane environments at higher altitudes in shrublands and forests. This alpine shrub often inhabits areas of mainly unburnt vegetation.

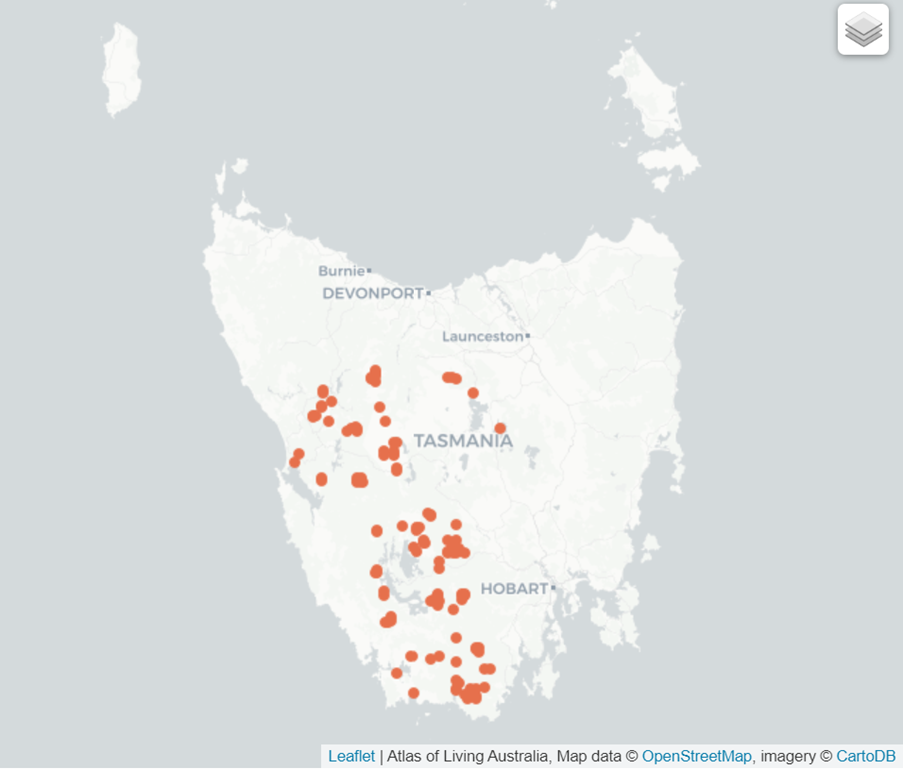
Distribution Map of Archeria serpyllifolia in Tasmania, Atlas of Living Australia, 2023

== Etymology ==
This plant was named by British botanist Joseph Dalton Hooker in 1844, after the nineteenth century Tasmanian botanist William Archer.
