= P. venosum =

P. venosum may refer to:

- Pelargonium × venosum, a geranium
- Polyphlebium venosum, a filmy fern
