= Savage River National Park =

National park in Tasmania, Australia

- IUCN category II (national park)
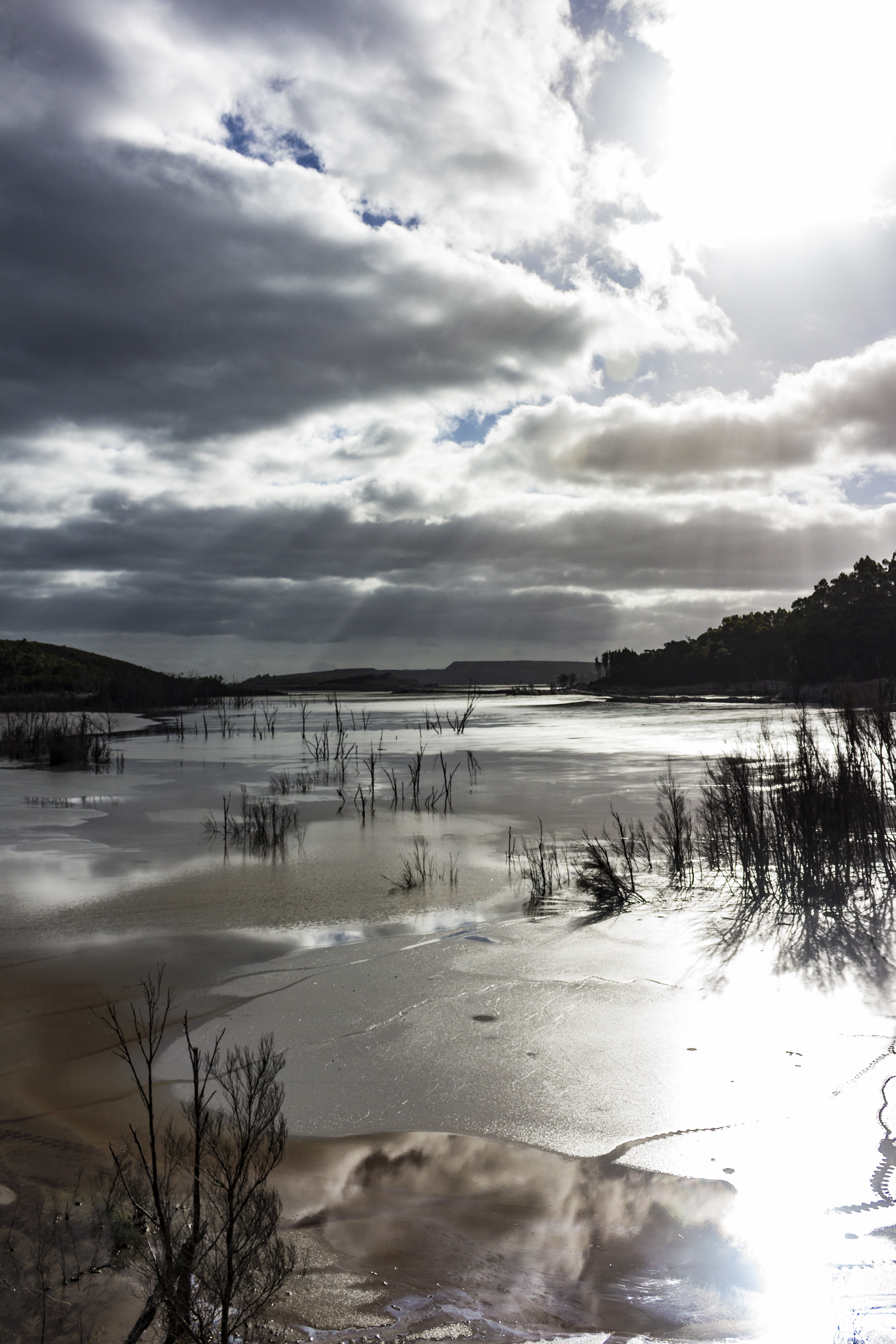

- Location within Tasmania
- Interactive map of Savage River National Park
- Location: Tasmania
- Nearest city: Savage River
- Coordinates: 41°21′14″S 145°24′33″E
- Area: 179.8 km^{2} (69.4 sq mi)
- Established: 1999
- Governing body: Tasmania Parks and Wildlife Service
- Website: Official website

Savage River National Park is located in north-west Tasmania, Australia. Established in April 1999, it is the largest undisturbed area of temperate rainforest in Australia. Unlike other national parks of Tasmania, Savage River National Park remains inaccessible to the public, there is no road access or facilities in the park. It is buffered by the Savage River Regional Reserve which has limited 4WD access.

The national park is dominated by cool temperate rainforest with extensive stands of myrtle beech dominated rainforest. A significant component of wet scrubland and buttongrass moorland dominate the Baretop Ridge. The park provides valuable habitat for many species of fauna including the Tasmanian devil, dusky antechinus, broad-toothed mouse, wedge-tailed eagle, swift parrot, grey goshawk and the giant freshwater crayfish.

== See also ==
- Protected areas of Tasmania
- Tarkine
- Tasmanian temperate rainforests
