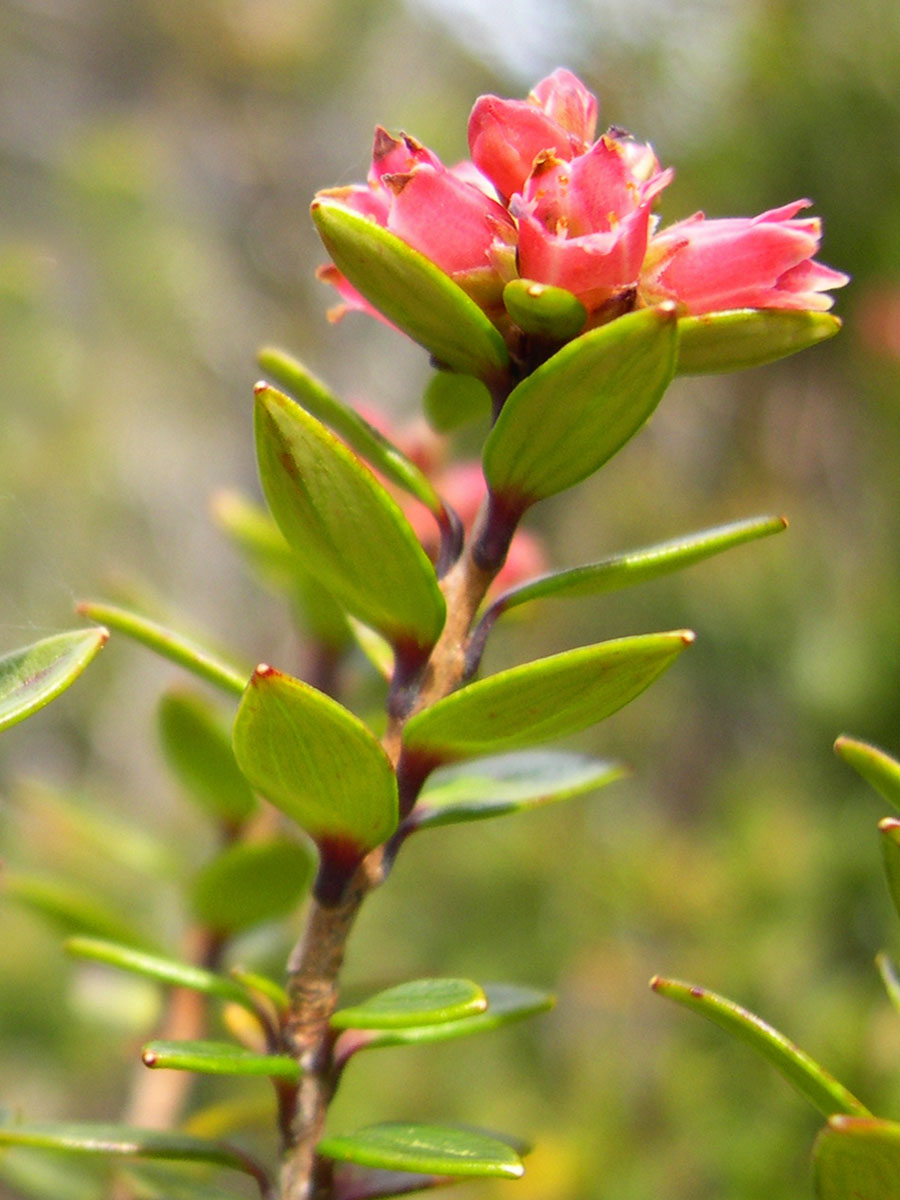

Scientific classification
- Kingdom: Plantae
- Clade: Tracheophytes
- Clade: Angiosperms
- Clade: Eudicots
- Clade: Asterids
- Order: Ericales
- Family: Ericaceae
- Genus: Archeria
- Species: A. traversii

Binomial name
- Archeria traversii Hook.f.

= Archeria traversii =

Species of flowering plant

Archeria traversii is a species of shrub in the family Ericaceae.

== Distribution ==
Archeria traversii is scattered locally across southern New Zealand (the South Island and Stewart Island), where it is endemic. It is notably absent from Marlborough and much of the eastern South Island.

== Ecology ==
It is largely found in shrublands and conifer-broadleaf forests, at lowland to montane altitudes. Flowering takes place from December to February, and fruiting from February to April.

== Morphology ==
Habit
An erect shrub, up to 5 m tall but often much shorter. It has spreading to ascending branches, with leaves that are fairly evenly spaced (rather than clustered, like A. racemosa). Multiple trunks are often formed, and can be highly twisted, rough, and covered in epiphytic bryophytes. The bark is dark brown in colour, with branchlets that are light reddish when young and light brown when mature.

Leaves
Narrow lanceolate leaves, becoming glabrous and leathery. Dark green on the adaxial side, while abaxially they tend to be much paler. The leaf apices are acute to subacute, and sometimes reddish in colour. The base of the leaf is rigid and nearly sessile, attached to the stem with a short and flat petiole. Dimensions are roughly 7–12 mm long and 2–4 mm wide. Leaf margins are entire, minutely ciliolate, and flat to slightly recurved. Prominent venation can often be seen on the abaxial sides of the leaves (3- to 5-veined).

Inflorescence
A solitary terminal raceme, with 8–16 flowers, ranging from 10 to 30 mm in length. The axis and short curved pedicels are both pubescent. The bracts are oblong and caducous.

Flowers and fruits
The flowers are perfect, 4–5 mm long, urn shaped, with a corolla that is white to pink to deep red in colour (often lighter at the base and darkening towards the lobes). The sepals are oblong and ciliolate, frequently light green but turning to red towards the tips. Capsules are 2–3 mm in diameter, with 3–5 locules.

== Evolutionary history ==
The phylogeny of the genus remains unknown, but morphologically A. traversii appears to most closely resemble A. racemosa, the only other New Zealand species in the genus.

== Conservation status ==
Archeria traversii is currently regarded as non-threatened.

== Etymology ==
Archeria was named by Joseph Dalton Hooker in 1844 after the nineteenth-century Tasmanian botanist W. Archer. The specific epithet traversii comes from William Travers, a 19th-century New Zealand naturalist and politician, after whom the plant species was named.
