= Archeria comberi =

Scientific classification
- Kingdom: Plantae
- Clade: Tracheophytes
- Clade: Angiosperms
- Clade: Eudicots
- Clade: Asterids
- Order: Ericales
- Family: Ericaceae
- Genus: Archeria
- Species: A. comberi

Binomial name
- Archeria comberi Melville

Species of flowering plant

Archeria comberi, also known as the pink mountain heath or comb heath, is a small, rare shrub endemic to Tasmania, Australia. As a member of the heath family, Ericaceae, this species is generally classified as a subalpine/alpine species and shares many characteristics with other members of the family. It is an evergreen shrub 0.15m-1m in height, with pink flowers during the summer months (January and December), hence its common name pink mountain heath. Archeria comberi is often found growing among other species such as Nothofagus gunnii and Persoonia gunnii.

== Description ==
Very similar to, and sometimes mistaken for, Epacris serpyllifolia, Archeria comberi has a number of key characteristics that enable its identification, especially the distinct pink, tubular flowers, with pink and yellow stigma and stamen, and fused sepals. These flowers are situated on a short stalk close to the end of each flowering branch. When not in flower, this species is characterised by: woody branches and branchlets with scattered hairs, rounded woody capsules with a star like opening during dispersal, small(~ 3–4 mm), waxy, round with a pointed tip, green and often red leaves arranged in whorls around the stem. With usually 3 faint almost parallel veins, each leaf generally has a light green abaxial surface, predominantly green, sometimes red adaxial surface and a red edge. This red colouration is a common characteristic of subalpine and alpine species caused by an increase of anthocyanin to absorb ultraviolet light and converting UV into heat energy, warming the plant earlier in the growing season.

== Environment ==
Endemic to Tasmania and found predominantly in Western Tasmania and the Central Plateau, this species is found in seven municipalities across Tasmania: Central Highlands, Derwent Valley, Huon Valley, Kentish, Meander Valley, and the West Coast. Although preferring a somewhat sheltered position Archeria comberi is a primarily alpine species and is subject to dramatically different weather conditions, including hot dry summers and cold, often snowy winter. Hence displays a tolerance to shade, wind, moist soils and frost. Favouring fertile loam soils that are low in phosphorus, and well drained the species is common is environments such as subalpine woodlands, montane vegetation, subalpine sedgelands, and subalpine wetlands, one example of this is the tarns situated in Mt Field National Park, Tasmania, Australia.
