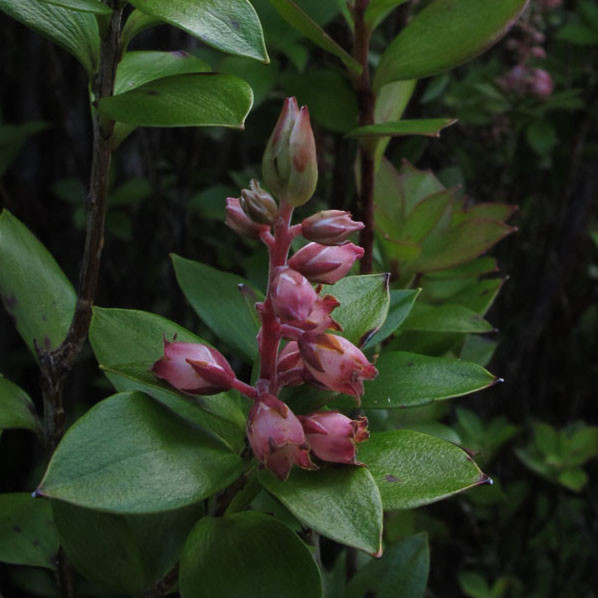

Scientific classification
- Kingdom: Plantae
- Clade: Tracheophytes
- Clade: Angiosperms
- Clade: Eudicots
- Clade: Asterids
- Order: Ericales
- Family: Ericaceae
- Genus: Archeria
- Species: A. racemosa

Binomial name
- Archeria racemosa Hook.f.

= Archeria racemosa =

Species of flowering plant

Archeria racemosa is a species of shrub in the family Ericaceae.

== Distribution ==
A. racemosa currently occupies a rather restricted range in northern New Zealand (where it is endemic), being found scattered throughout Little Barrier Island, Great Barrier Island, the Coromandel Peninsula, and from the Bay of Plenty across to East Cape.

== Ecology ==
It is largely found in shrublands and forest margins, at lowland to montane altitudes. Flowering takes place from December to January, and fruiting from February to April.

== Morphology ==
Habit An erect shrub, to 5 m tall but often much shorter. It has spreading branches, with leaves that tend to cluster towards the ends of the branches. The bark is dark brown to black in colour. Leaves Broad leathery leaves that are obovate to elliptic-oblong in shape, often with sharp tips (acute to apiculate). The base of the leaf is rigid and nearly sessile, attached to the stem with a short and flat petiole. Dimensions are roughly 25–40 mm long and 8–12 mm wide. Leaf margins are entire, and flat to slightly recurved. Prominent venation can be seen on the abaxial sides of some leaves (3-5 veined), but this is indistinct on others. When crushed the leaves have an almost pungent smell at times. Inflorescence A solitary terminal raceme, with 10-20(30) flowers, ranging from 25 to 45 mm in length. The axis is pubescent, with short curved pedicels. Bracts are light red to pinkish, ciliolate, and caducous. Flowers & Fruits The flowers are perfect, small, urn shaped, and white to bright pink in colour (often lighter at the base and darkening towards the corolla lobes). The sepals are almost free, roughly 2–3 mm long, oblong-lanceolate, and blunt with ciliolate margins. The corolla is around 6 mm long, with the tube making up 4 mm and the lobes the other 2 mm. Ovary is deeply 5-lobed, with a stout persistent style. Capsules are 2–3 mm in diameter, subglobose, with 3-5 locules. A second form of flowers has rarely been observed during years of heavy flowering. This form is a shorter more erect and compact raceme of light yellow male flowers. The corolla tubes are shorter and the bracts more spread out.

== Evolutionary history ==
The phylogeny of the genus remains unknown, but morphologically A. racemosa appears to most closely resemble A. traversii, the only other New Zealand species in the genus.

== Conservation status ==
Archeria racemosa is currently regarded as naturally uncommon, and non threatened.

== Etymology ==
Archeria was named by Joseph Dalton Hooker in 1844 after the nineteenth century Tasmanian botanist W. Archer. The specific epithet "racemosa" refers to the racemes of flowers, and was given to the plant in 1864, again by Hooker.
