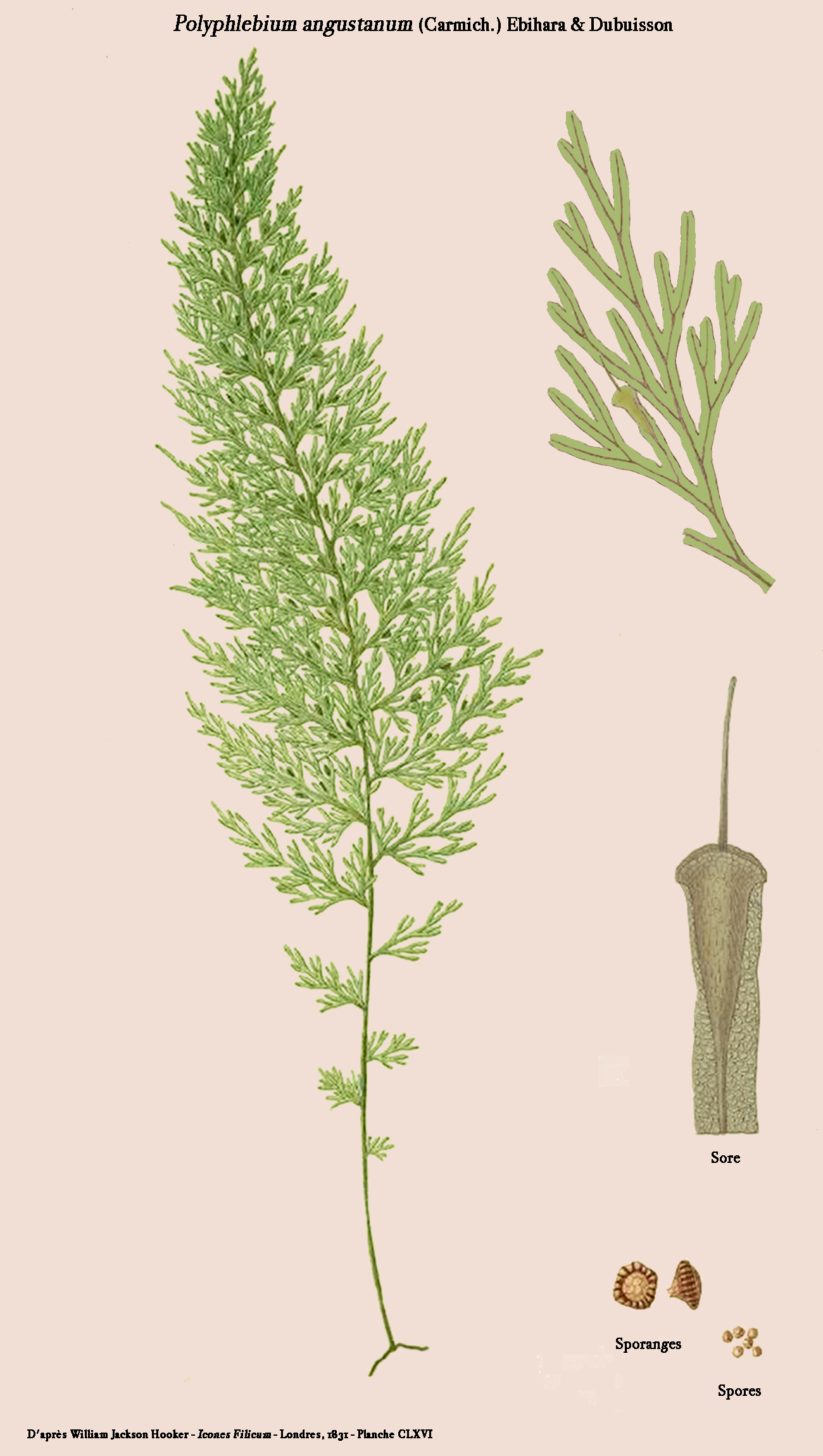

Conservation status
- Least Concern (IUCN 3.1)

Scientific classification
- Kingdom: Plantae
- Clade: Tracheophytes
- Division: Polypodiophyta
- Class: Polypodiopsida
- Order: Hymenophyllales
- Family: Hymenophyllaceae
- Genus: Polyphlebium
- Species: P. angustatum

Binomial name
- Polyphlebium angustatum (Carmich.) Ebihara & Dubuisson

Synonyms
- Trichomanes angustatum Carmich.; Vandenboschia angustata (Carmich.) Copel.; Trichomanes fulvum Klotzsch; Trichomanes intermedium Kaulf.; Trichomanes schiedeanum Fée; Trichomanes subexsertum Bosch; Trichomanes tenerum Spreng.; Vandenboschia tenera (Spreng.) Copel.

= Polyphlebium angustatum =

Species of fern

Polyphlebium angustatum is a species of fern in the family Hymenophyllaceae. It is found in South America and on a number of Atlantic islands, including Tristan da Cunha. The genus Polyphlebium is accepted in the Pteridophyte Phylogeny Group classification of 2016 (PPG I), but not by other sources. As of October 2019, Plants of the World Online sank the genus into a broadly defined Trichomanes, treating this species as Trichomanes angustatum.
