= Polyphlebium tenuissimum =

Scientific classification
- Kingdom: Plantae
- Clade: Embryophytes
- Clade: Tracheophytes
- Division: Polypodiophyta
- Class: Polypodiopsida
- Order: Hymenophyllales
- Family: Hymenophyllaceae
- Genus: Polyphlebium
- Species: P. tenuissimum

Binomial name
- Polyphlebium tenuissimum (Bosch) comb. ined.

Synonyms
- Trichomanes tenuissimum Bosch

Species of fern

Polyphlebium tenuissimum, synonym Trichomanes tenuissimum, is a species of fern in the family Hymenophyllaceae. It is endemic to Ecuador. In 2006, in a taxonomic revision of the family Hymenophyllaceae, Ebihara et al. assigned this species to the genus Polyphlebium rather than Trichomanes. However the combination does not appear to have been formally published; hence the "comb. ined." (combinatio inedita) in the Checklist of Ferns and Lycophytes of the World.
