= Tarkine =

takayna / Tarkine
- Region
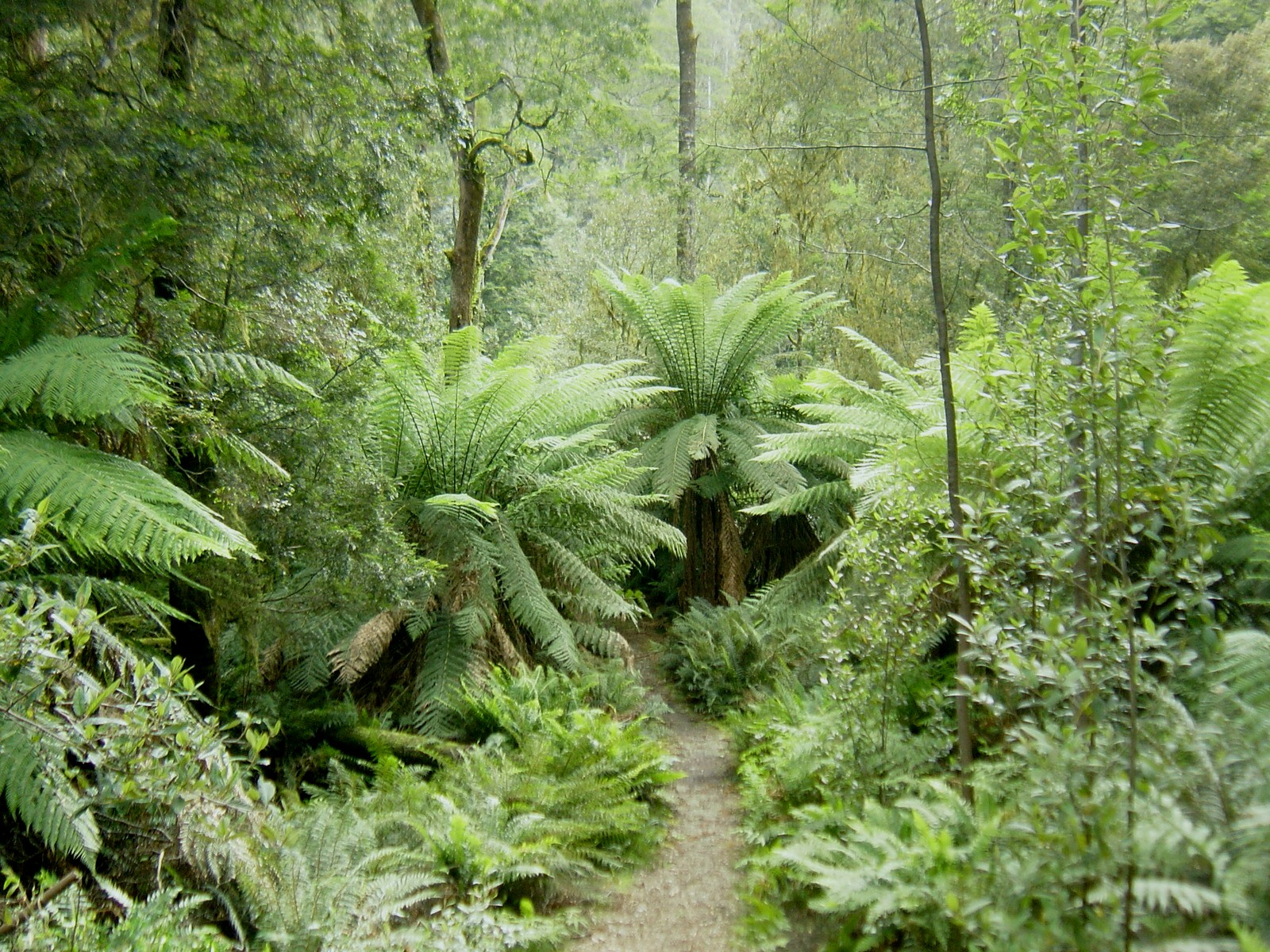
- Ferns at Hellyer Gorge in the north of the Tarkine.

- Coordinates: 41°25′S 145°8′E
- Country: Australia
- State: Tasmania
- LGA: Circular Head; Waratah-Wynyard; West Coast

The Tarkine (Indigenous name: takayna), officially takayna / the Tarkine, is an area containing the Savage River National Park in North West Tasmania, Australia, which contains significant areas of wilderness.

The Tarkine is noted for its beauty and natural values, containing the largest area of Gondwanan cool-temperate rainforest in Australia, as well as for its prominence in Tasmania's early mining history. The area's high concentration of Aboriginal sites has led to it being described by the Australian Heritage Council as "one of the world's great archaeological regions".

== Location ==
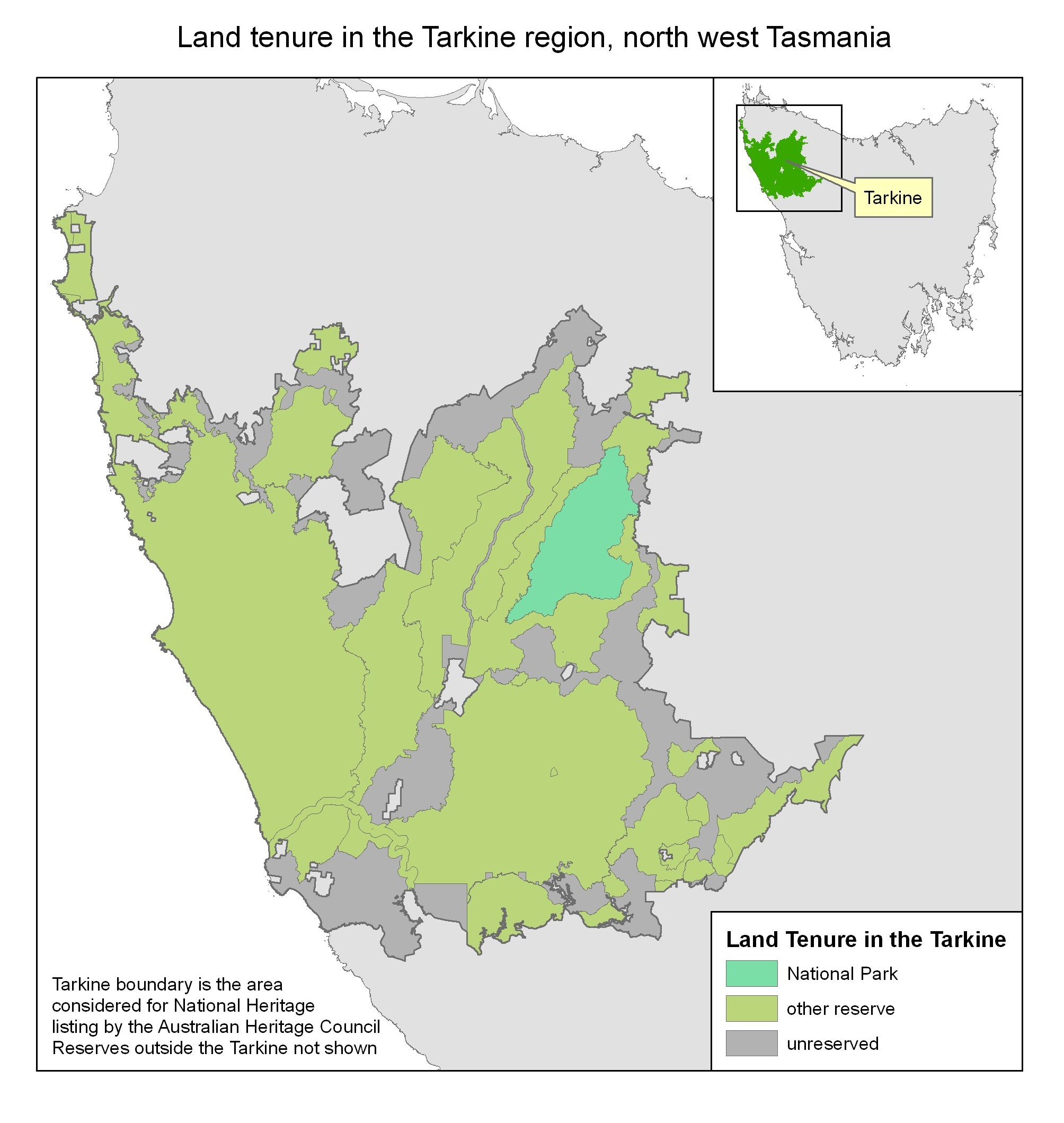
Tarkine land tenure

The Tarkine is gazetted by the Tasmanian government as an unbounded locality in northwest Tasmania. The generally accepted definition is the area between the Arthur River in the North, the Pieman River in the south, the ocean to the west and the Murchison Highway in the east.

It was first officially recognised in May 2013, following a recommendation by the Nomenclature Board of Tasmania which was accepted by Bryan Green. He declared that the name applied to the whole northwest region of Tasmania, but this interpretation was rejected by the Cradle Coast Authority, which had requested the official naming. The name does not appear in maps, but in recent decades has featured prominently in the Australian media as a subject of contention between conservationists and mining/logging interests.

The Tarkine can be entered from several points, with the most common being via Sumac Road from the north, Corinna in the south, Waratah in the west and Wynyard from the northeast. Burnie airport, located near Wynyard, provides interstate flights, and there is sealed road access from the airport into the Tarkine.

== Etymology ==
The name "Tarkine" was coined by the conservation movement and was in use by 1991. It is a diminutive of the name "Tarkiner", which is the anglicised pronunciation of one of the Aboriginal tribes who inhabited the western Tasmanian coastline from the Arthur River to the Pieman River before European colonisation.

== Natural and archaeological values ==
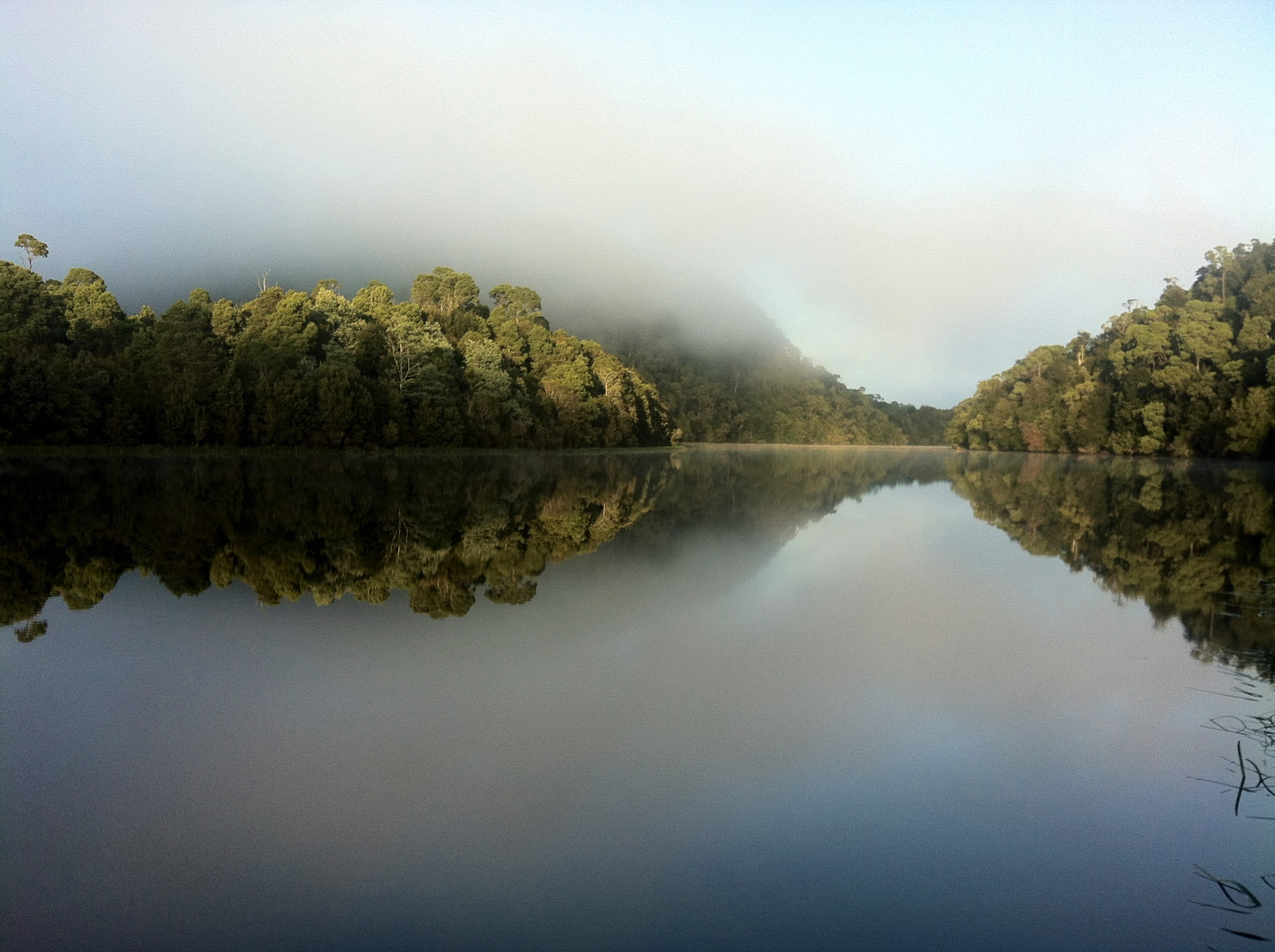
Pieman River in Arthur-Pieman Conservation Area

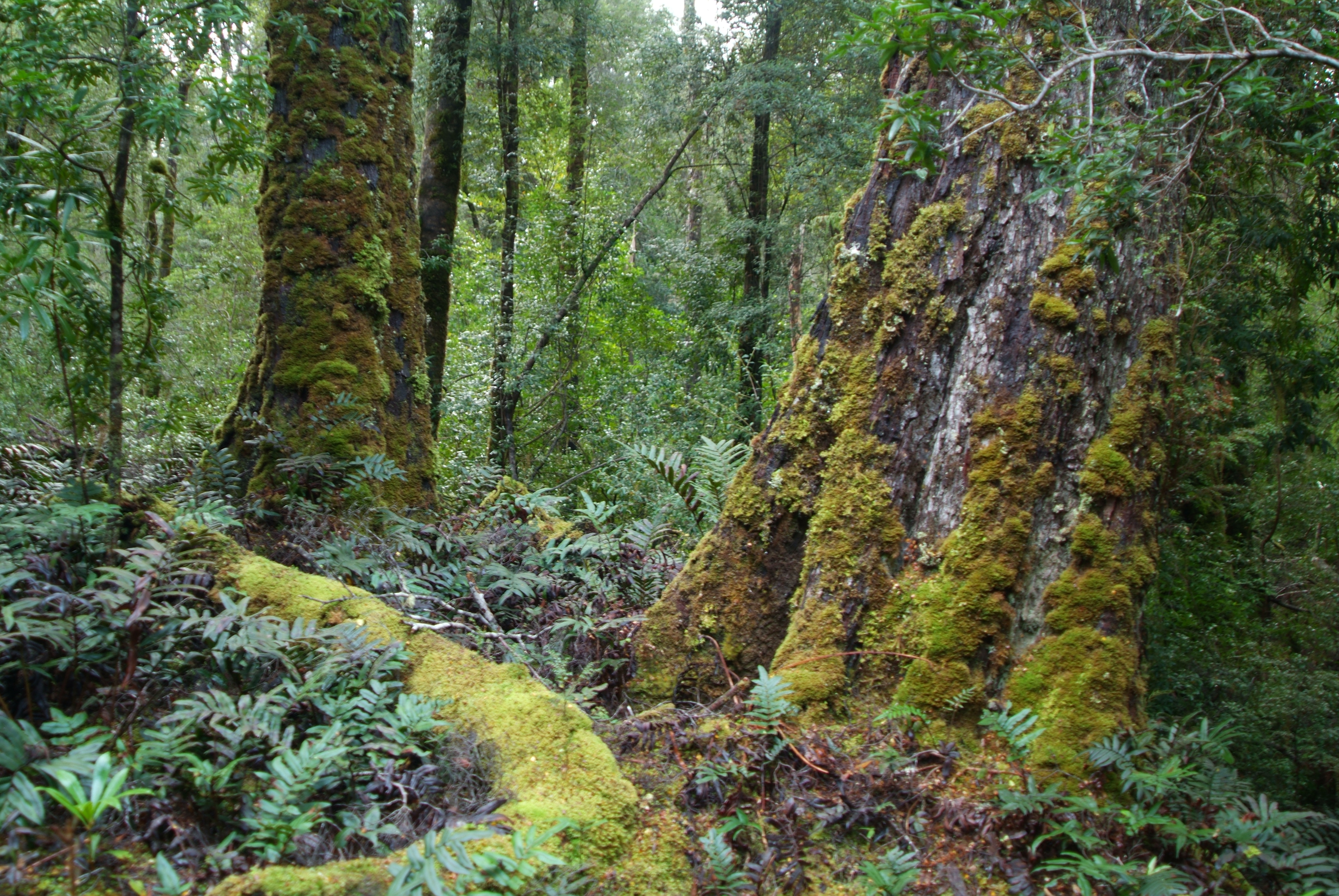
Tarkine forest, 2007

The Tarkine contains extensive high-quality wilderness as well as extensive, largely undisturbed tracts of cool temperate rainforest which are extremely rare. It also represents Australia's largest remaining single tract of temperate rainforest. It contains approximately 1,800 km² of rainforest, around 400 km² of eucalypt forest and a mosaic of other vegetation communities, including dry sclerophyll forest, woodland, buttongrass moorland, sandy littoral communities, wetlands, grassland and Sphagnum communities.

Significantly, it has a high diversity of non-vascular plants (mosses, liverworts and lichens) including at least 151 species of liverworts and 92 species of mosses. Its range of vertebrate fauna include 28 terrestrial mammals, 111 land and freshwater birds, 11 reptiles, 8 frogs and 13 freshwater fish. The Tarkine provides habitat for over 60 rare, threatened and endangered species of flora and fauna.

The area comprises a number of rivers, exposed mountains, globally unique magnesite and dolomite cave systems and the largest basalt plateau in Tasmania to have retained its original vegetation.

There are also large sand dune areas extending several kilometres inland. Some of these contain ancient Aboriginal middens.

The Tarkine played a central role in the development of Tasmania's early mining industry, and remains of early mining activity can still be seen in many rivers and creeks in the area that were mined for gold, tin and osmiridium. Nowadays the remains of approximately 600 sites of historic mining activity in the area are still evident. The majority of these mining operations were alluvial workings or small hard-rock mines, consisting often of single adits. Larger scale mining has been carried out mainly at Luina, Savage River and Mt Bischoff. Part of the area is contained in the Arthur – Pieman Conservation Area managed by the Tasmania parks and wildlife service.

=== Early conservation movement ===
The campaign to protect the Tarkine began in the 1960s. A formal conservation proposal was put forward by the then Circular Head Mayor Horace Arnold 'Jim' Lane for the establishment of a 'Norfolk Range National Park'. Lane's proposal was ahead of its time, though his proposal wasn't seen to fruition.

From the late 1990s, the area came under increasing national and international scrutiny in a similar vein to the environmental protests surrounding Tasmania's Franklin River and Queensland's Daintree Rainforest. The case for protecting the Tarkine was significantly advanced with the Federal Government's Forestry Package in 2005 adding 70,000 hectares (170,000 acres) to reserves in the Tarkine.

Only 10% of takayna/the Tarkine area is protected as National Park, with the 180km2 Savage River National Park. which protects the largest contiguous area of cool temperate rainforest surviving in Australia.

=== Current land tenure and legislation ===
The Tasmanian reserve management system is one of the most comprehensive and sophisticated in Australia. The Nature Conservation Act 2002 (NCA) and the National Parks and Reserves Management Act 2002 (NPRMA) are the two key pieces of Tasmania legislation that empower reserve management.

Tasmania has eight separate public reserve classes with each class having detailed values and purposes for reservation defined in legislation. Just because a parcel of land is placed in the formal reserve system, does not mean that all activities are banned within the area. Some reserves, like National Parks and State Reserves, are set aside for conservation as well as ecologically sustainable tourism. One such example is the Corinna Wilderness Village, which empowers the region by allowing tourists to experience the southern end of takayna/the Tarkine in an accessible and ecologically friendly way. Game reserves are set aside for conservation purposes and also allow the ecologically sustainable taking of designated game species (i.e. hunting).

Two classes of reserve - Regional Reserves and Conservation Areas are both reserve classes aimed at conserving biological and geological diversity whilst also allowing for mining and the controlled use of other natural resources including sustainable harvesting of special timbers.

Whilst some in the environment movement claim that Tasmanian legislation was changed in 2014 to allow for special timbers harvesting in Regional Reserves and Conservation Areas, the legislative record does not support this contention. This issue was closely examined in 2015 by the Director of National Parks in his report to the Tasmanian Planning Commission on public representations received on the Draft Tasmanian Wilderness World Heritage Area Management Plan. In the section of the report discussing specialty timber harvesting the Director clearly stated that "The management objectives for conservation areas and regional reserves (s5 and s7, Schedule 1 NPRMA) have included ‘the controlled use of natural resources’, since the NPRMA commenced in 2002 and prior to that they were in the National Parks and Wildlife Act 1970" and "The 2014 legislation did not provide anything that was not already implicitly or explicitly provided for in regional reserves and conservation areas."

The Tarkine contains a variety of reserve tenures including; National park, State Reserve, Regional Reserve, Conservation Area and nature Recreation Areas. Some reserves, such as the Savage River Regional Reserve, provide protection for core wilderness areas, acting as buffers as can be seen in the Draft Savage River National Park and Savage River Regional Reserve Management Plan 2001.

=== Proposed Tarkine National Heritage listing ===
In December 2009, the Tarkine was listed as a National Heritage Area following an Emergency National Heritage Listing. The Emergency Listing was in response to a proposed Tarkine Road, which would have coursed through old growth forest and detrimentally affected the natural values of undisturbed areas. In December 2010, the incoming Environment Minister Tony Burke allowed the emergency listing to lapse in the face of numerous mining proposals in the Tarkine. This was despite recommendations from the Australian Heritage Council to permanently list takayna/the Tarkine. Minister Burke had further extended the period for reassessment of the Tarkine, with the Australian Heritage Council due to re-report on the suitability of takayna/the Tarkine as a National Heritage location by the end of December 2013. Conservation groups declared this an unacceptable delay, and had voiced concerns that this left the Tarkine unprotected from mining while the reassessment took place.

On 8 February 2013 Minister Tony Burke announced that he would reject advice from the Australian Heritage Council that 433,000 hectares should be heritage listed and instead apply a National Heritage Listing only to the 21,000 hectares contained in a 2 km wide section along the coastline.

=== Proposed Tarkine National Park ===
The environmentalist organisation Tarkine National Coalition, headed by Scott Jordan, proposed the Tarkine be officially declared a national park. However, the process of securing such a declaration has been complicated by the processes of the Tasmanian Forests Intergovernmental Agreement. This legislation was signed on 7 August 2011 by Australian Prime Minister Julia Gillard and Tasmanian Premier Lara Giddings. The agreement established a $276 million package to transition Tasmania out of native forest logging, while conserving large areas of high conservation value vegetation. Julia Gillard stated that the Agreement would better protect the Tarkine, describing the wilderness area as "very important".

Subsequent related state legislation (the Tasmanian Forests Agreement Bill 2013) passed through the Tasmanian House of Assembly on 23 November 2012 and then passed to the Tasmanian Legislative Council where it was debated and referred on to a Select Committee. It was ultimately passed on 30 April 2013. The Hobart Mercury noted that "Despite a raft of controversial amendments from the Upper House, all but one of the Tasmanian Greens MPs supported the Bill in the Lower House"

Following enactment of the TFA Act 2013 an initial tranche of land was placed in the Tasmanian Reserve System (approx 100,000ha of the 572,000ha sought by the ENGOs) with the remainder sitting as "future reserve land" that could be added to the state's reserve system once key conditions of the TFA Act were met. Thes conditions included meeting guaranteed wood supply, a lack of substantive protest and Forestry Tasmania (now Sustainable Timbers Tasmania) achieving Forest Stewardship Council certification. The Tasmanian EDO provided information on the reserve making process under the TFA and clearly stated "there is no guarantee under the TFA Act that any reserves will be created, or what category any reserves may be in."

An explanation of land reserved or proposed to be reserved under the TFA Act 2013 can be seen in former Federal Green's leader, Senator Christine Milne's document here.

Following a change in Tasmanian state government in 2014, the TFA Act was repealed and the TFA future reserve lands were reclassified as Future Potential Production Forest(FPPF) land under the Forestry (Rebuilding the Forest Industry) Act 2014. The initial tranche of TFA reserves including those in the 2013 Tasmanian Wilderness World Heritage Area extension was not repealed under this legislation and remain in place today. Similarly, 198 former forest reserves (approx 200,000ha) whose tenure was changed to Regional Reserve and Conservation Area under Labor's Forest Management (Consequential Amendments) Act 2013 remain in place.

Following the repeal of the TFA Act, Tasmanian Labor acknowledged that the TFA had not provided a workable outcome for the special timbers sector and subsequently provided bi-partisan support for specialty timber harvesting in land tenures where such an activity is permitted. This position is similar but more restrictive than Labor's position contained within the TFA Act 2013 where special timber harvesting could occur on any land tenure including inside the TWWHA.

The Tarkine area currently contains some lots of FPPF land which may be available for forestry activity after 2020. Sustainable special timber harvesting has been available in FPPF land since October 2017 following the finalisation of the Special Species Timber Management Plan.

The campaign for a Tarkine National Park continues.

=== Specialty timber harvesting in the Tarkine ===
State legislation allows for sustainable specialty timber harvesting within some land tenures within the Tarkine. These tenures include Regional Reserves, Conservation Areas and FPPF land. Mining is also allowed on these tenures. According to a policy initiative of ENGOs The Wilderness Society, Australian Conservation Foundation, and 17 others including Tarkine National Coalition and Melbourne Tarkine Action Group labour-intensive boat building, fine furniture and craft-based timber industries use a volume of special species timber which is 18,500m3 p.a.. This initiative stated "By shifting woodchip production from native forests to plantations, it becomes possible to focus native forest production on low-volume, high-quality products, such as specialty timbers. This would require managing some areas on long intervals between logging operations as well as the planting of suitable species on private land."

Similar support for sustainable special timber harvesting also was expressed from the Australian and Tasmanian Greens. In his letter to Br Bill Kelty, dated 6 March 2011, former Senators Bob Brown and Christine Milne called "for agreed areas to be set aside for sustainable selective logging of high-quality, specialty timbers."

Later in 2011, former Senator Brown also stated in an article in The Examiner newspaper "The Greens have always wanted to provide for specialty timbers for craft work, furnishings, the things Tasmania are so famous for and proud of, in an ongoing forestry industry," he said "If the Libs find fault with that, crikey, is there anything they can agree too?"

Research into post-harvest forest regeneration systems for rainforest commenced in north-western Tasmania in 1976 with fourteen rainforest harvesting and regeneration trials being established over the following decade. Subsequent monitoring of these sites has shown that dense regeneration of myrtle and other rainforest species occurs after harvesting on fertile sites if the seedbed is exposed and trees are retained for seed and shelter. One such trial established in the Tarkine was the Sumac forest harvest trials. Commenced in 1976, this trial was conducted to establish the best silviculture method for regenerating Myrtle dominated forest post harvesting to ensure an ongoing supply of special timbers. Harvesting techniques trialled included; selective harvesting, strip felling, shelterwood, clearfell with cull retention and clearfell.

Regeneration techniques trialled included; ground scarification, post-harvest burning and for the selective harvest areas no treatment beyond natural canopy openings from felled trees and minor soil disturbance from harvesting equipment.

The trial site was successfully regenerated and monitored over decades with the resultant research informing silvicultural prescriptions. In 2015, the World Heritage Committee Reactive Monitoring Mission toured the Sumac trial site with forest ecologists and stated what they had seen was "world's best practice". In 2017, aerial video footage was taken of the key trial site in the Sumac region which can be seen in this video.

In 2014-17, a study into special timber location, standing volumes and perpetual sustainable yields was carried out. This project commenced under the Tasmanian Forest Agreement process with funding from the former federal Labor government and was completed in October 2017. Utilising best available modelling techniques including LiDAR, a standing volume of special timbers (14.3 million cubic metres) and subsequent annual sustainable yields in perpetuity were developed. Areas assessed included parts of the Tarkine where underlying land tenure allowed for sustainable harvesting. The subsequent work was publicly released in the 2017 Special Species Timber Management Plan.

Given that significant areas of special timber forests were included in the 2013 Tasmanian Wilderness World Heritage Area extension, the Tarkine area remains a vital resource for the culturally significant special timbers sector.

Although ENGOs had previously shown strong support for the special timbers sector, this has now largely been withdrawn due to the conflict between resource location and reservation aspirations.

=== Mining in the Tarkine ===
The areas of Corinna - Long Plains, as well as the Savage, Donaldson and Whyte rivers, were important early goldfields, exploited since the 1870s. Tasmania's two largest gold nuggets, of 7.6 and 4.4 kg, were found near the confluence of the Whyte and Rocky rivers. Tin mining was prominent in both the Mt Bischoff - Waratah area, starting in the 1870s, and the Meredith Range - Stanley River - Wilson River area. The Mt. Bischoff mine in Waratah was in its heyday one of the richest tin deposits in the world. From the 1880s onwards, osmiridium was extensively mined in many creeks and rivers in the catchments of the Savage, Haezlewood and Wilson rivers, and particularly the Bald Hill area. Tin, copper and tungsten were mined at Balfour, and, from the 1890s, the Magnet mine was exploited for silver. It continues to be a significant amateur fossicking area for mineral specimens to this day.

Historically, approximately 600 mine tenements have been worked in the Tarkine area, but most of them were small alluvial workings, involving the sifting of gravels from riverbeds. Mining activity in the Tarkine has continued uninterrupted since the 1870s, and two modern industrial mines are currently operating in the area: a small silica quarry, and a large open-cut iron ore mine at Savage River. Both these existing mines are outside of the proposed Tarkine National Park boundary. In addition, 38 exploration licenses are currently held over areas of the Tarkine, and 10 mines have been proposed over the 2012-2017 period. Of these proposed mines, nine are proposed to be open cut mines.

The issue of mining in takayna/the Tarkine is highly contentious, as conservationists oppose the environmental damage caused by modern mining methods. The Tarkine is highly prospective for economically-important minerals, and proponents argue that current and proposed mines would take up just 1% of the Tarkine. Conservationists argue that this impact is greater when considering transport routes and damage to water catchments. They point to the acid mine drainage affecting the Whyte River, rendering it orange-stained and devoid of aquatic life for six kilometres, due to the now-closed Cleveland mine at Luina, and similar impacts downstream from historic operations of the Savage River mine and the closed Mt Bischoff mine. Acid mine drainage (AMD) is the leaching of sulphuric acid, caused by the chemical reaction between sulphides in the ore and oxygen that can occur once ore is exposed to atmosphere. Start-up mining company Venture Minerals has proposed three open-cut mines within the existing reserves and moratorium area, with plans to explore over an additional 37 km of potentially ore-bearing skarns.

Conservation groups, such as the Tarkine National Coalition and Operation Groundswell, oppose new mines and mining exploration in the Tarkine, and are warning of a campaign to surpass the Franklin River campaign of the 1980s. Alternatively, significant local support for mining has also been evidenced, with over 3500 people attending one pro-development rally, and the mayors of the four affected council areas publicly condemning the environmental groups.
