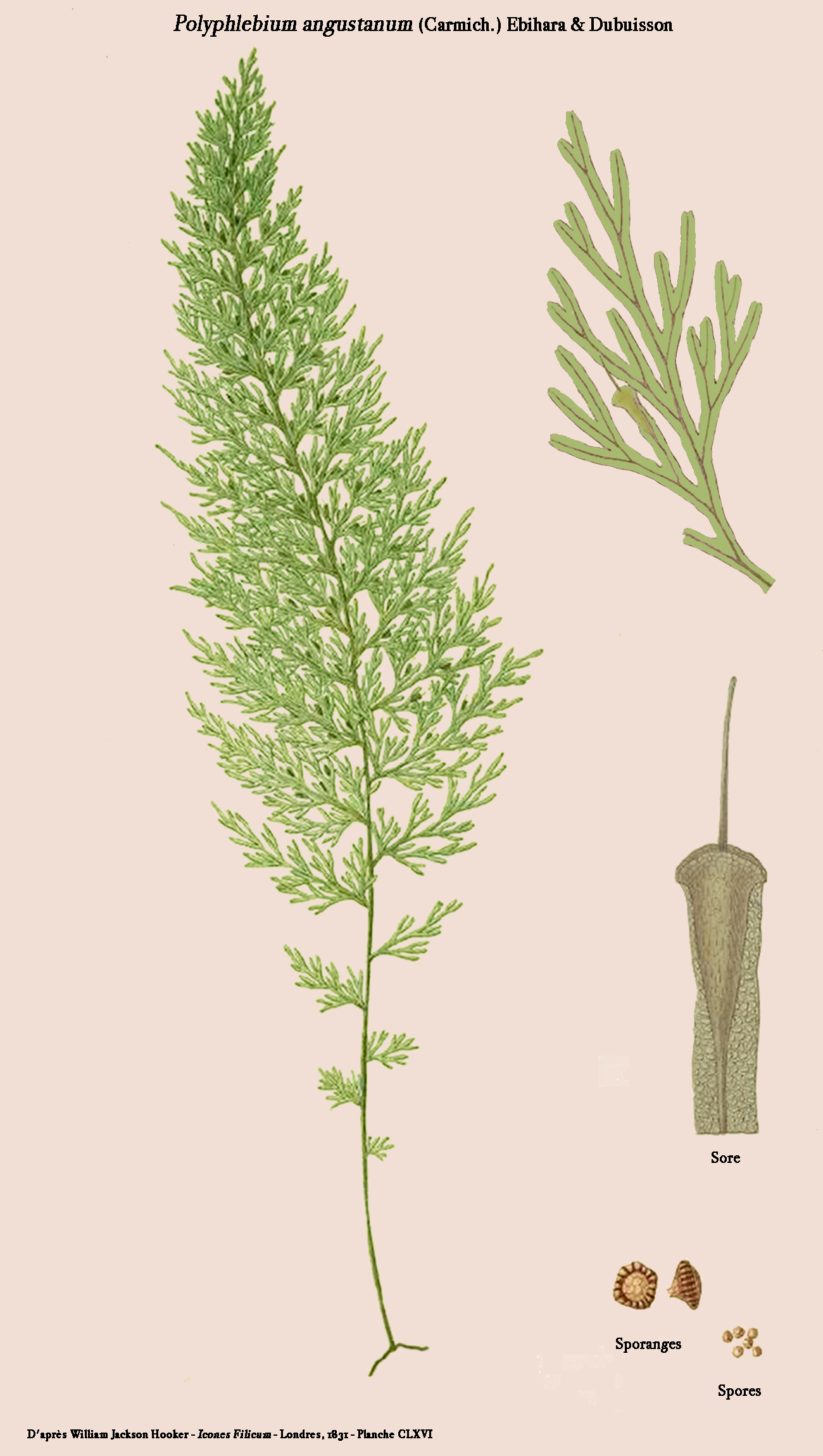
- Illustration of Polyphlebium angustatum

Scientific classification
- Kingdom: Plantae
- Clade: Tracheophytes
- Division: Polypodiophyta
- Class: Polypodiopsida
- Order: Hymenophyllales
- Family: Hymenophyllaceae
- Subfamily: Trichomanoideae
- Genus: Polyphlebium; Copel.

Type species
- Polyphlebium venosum (Brown) Copeland

Species
- See text

Synonyms
- Phlebiophyllum van den Bosch 1861

= Polyphlebium =

Genus of ferns

Polyphlebium is a fern genus in the family Hymenophyllaceae. The genus is accepted in the Pteridophyte Phylogeny Group classification of 2016 (PPG I) but not by some other sources.

== Taxonomy ==
The genus Polyphlebium was erected by Edwin Copeland in 1938. Its status, like other genera in the family Hymenophyllaceae, remains disputed. The Pteridophyte Phylogeny Group classification of 2016 (PPG I) accepts the genus, saying that there are about 15 species. As of October 2019, the Checklist of Ferns and Lycophytes of the World lists 17 species, whereas Plants of the World Online sinks the genus into Trichomanes.

== Phylogeny ==
As of October 2019, the Checklist of Ferns and Lycophytes of the World accepted the following species: Phylogeny of Polyphlebium by Fern Tree of Life.

- Polyphlebium
  - P. exsectum (Kunze) Ebihara & Dubuisson
  - - - P. colensoi (Hook. fil.) Ebihara & K.Iwats.
      - - P. venosum (R.Br.) Copel.
        - - P. endlicherianum (C.Presl) Ebihara & K.Iwats.
          - P. vieillardii (Bosch) Ebihara & K.Iwats.
    - - P. ingae (C.Chr.) Ebihara & Dubuisson
      - - - P. angustatum (Carmich.) Ebihara & Dubuisson
          - P. capillaceum (L.) Ebihara & Dubuisson
        - - P. diaphanum (Kunth) Ebihara & Dubuisson
          - P. hymenophylloides (Bosch) Ebihara & Dubuisson

Unassigned species:

- Polyphlebium borbonicum (Bosch) Ebihara & Dubuisson
- Polyphlebium haughtii (Morton) comb. ined.
- Polyphlebium herzogii (Rosenst.) A.R.Sm. & M.Kessler
- Polyphlebium philippianum (Sturm) Ebihara & Dubuisson
- Polyphlebium pyxidiferum (L.) Ebihara & Dubuisson
- Polyphlebium tenuissimum (Bosch) comb. ined.
- Polyphlebium werneri (Rosenst.) Ebihara & K.Iwats.

== See also ==
- List of fern families
