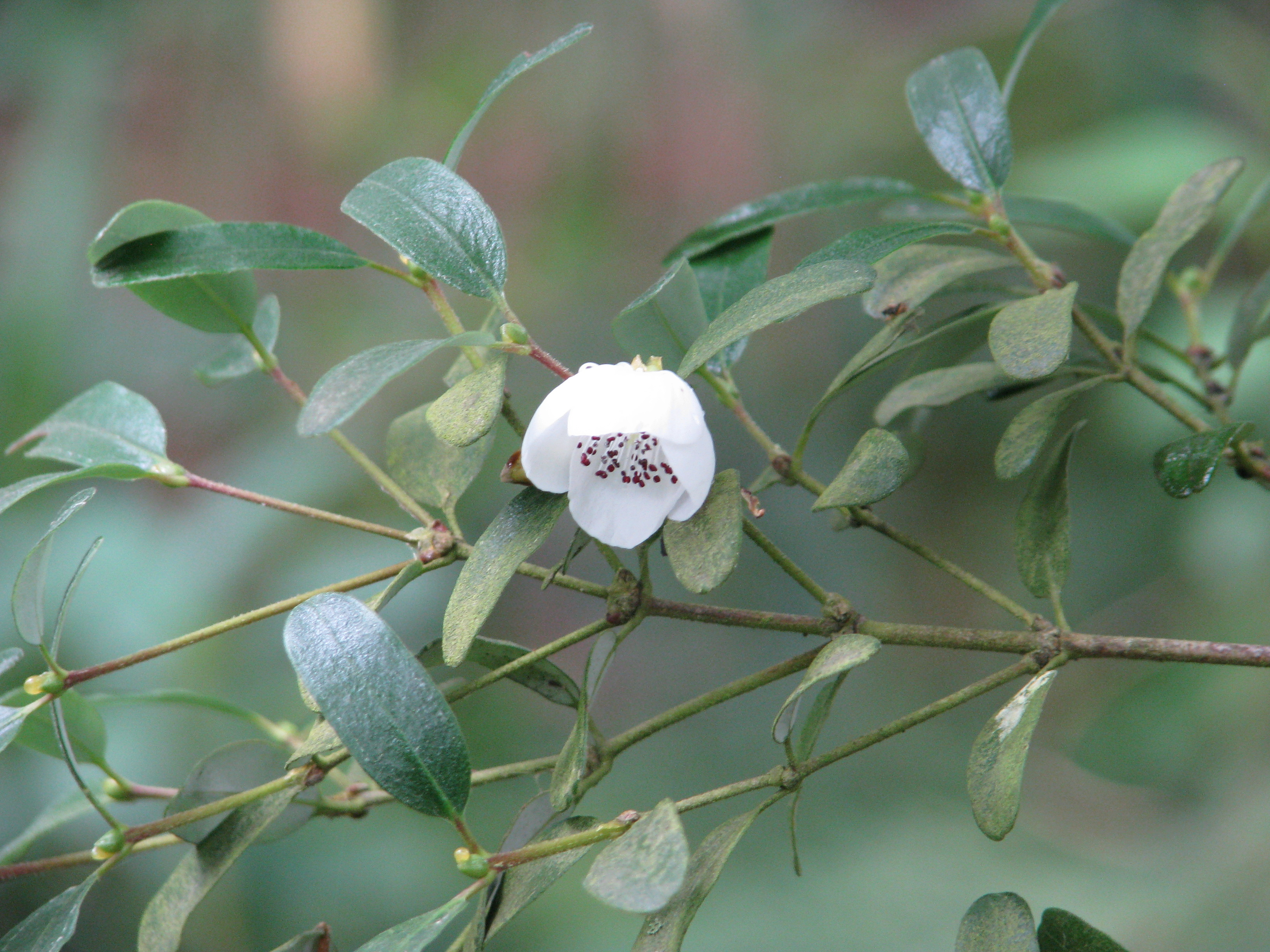

Conservation status
- Least Concern (IUCN 3.1)

Scientific classification
- Kingdom: Plantae
- Clade: Tracheophytes
- Clade: Angiosperms
- Clade: Eudicots
- Clade: Rosids
- Order: Oxalidales
- Family: Cunoniaceae
- Genus: Eucryphia
- Species: E. milliganii

Binomial name
- Eucryphia milliganii Hook.f.

Subspecies
- Eucryphia milliganii subsp. milliganii; Eucryphia milliganii subsp. pubescens R.W.Barnes, G.J.Jord., R.S.Hill & McCoull

Synonyms
- Eucryphia billardierei var. milliganii (Hook.f.) Benth., nom. illeg. homonym. post.; Eucryphia lucida var. milliganii (Hook.f.) Summerh., nom. illeg. homonym. post.

= Eucryphia milliganii =

Species of tree

Eucryphia milliganii, also known as the dwarf leatherwood, is a shrub or small tree endemic to areas of Tasmania. It grows in western and southern Tasmania, where it is most commonly found in alpine and sub-alpine heath areas. It is related to the popular horticulture plant Eucryphia lucida also known as leatherwood.

== Description ==
Eucryphia milliganii, is an evergreen, normally small shrub growing a few meters high, but in the right conditions can form a tree habit growing up to 14 m. It is densely branched and is normally slender with branches being blackish-brown with a terete and hairless form. Stipules present and interpetiolar, ovate, brown and never longer than 1 mm. Leaves are simple, opposite and densely packed, especially at the ends of branches. They are elliptic and length rarely exceeding twice the breadth, upper surface dark green, shining while under surface is very glaucous and reticulate. Both surfaces have venation; 0.4-1.4 cm long and 0.2-0.6 cm broad.

Flowers are solitary, axillary; pedicel bracteate at the base, ~0.7 cm long and peduncle is not visible. Four bracts that are brown, imbricate, rigid and the external ones are ovate, acute and 1–1.5 mm long. While internal ones are linear-ovate and ~2mm long. Sepals 4, broadly ovate to oblong, obtuse, rigid, brown, margins on the upper and under surfaces slightly hairy and up to 4mm long. Four petals that are white ovate and about 8mm long. Many stamens but rarely less much than 20, filaments up to 4m long and surrounded by short tubular ciliate effigurations. Ovary ovoid-oblong, densely adpressedly villose and up to 2 mm long. Flowers February–May.

Fruit septicidally 4-5 valved, dark brown with valves pubescent on the back and glabrous at the sides. Epicarp mature fruits splits off from endocarp, which splits ~1/4 of its length. Seeds in each valve up to 3 mm long and winged dark brown, glabrous.

== Distribution ==
Interior of Tasmania towards the south and west coast. It is most common in alpine and sub-alpine areas where it grows in relatively undisturbed heath, but it extends virtually to sea level in scrubby vegetation. There are two subspecies of E. milliganii. E. milliganii subsp. milliganii grows north of a line running from Macquarie Harbour to Bruny Island. The leaves of this subspecies are oblong. The southern subspecies, E. milliganii subsp. pubescens, grows south of this line and has ovate leaves.
