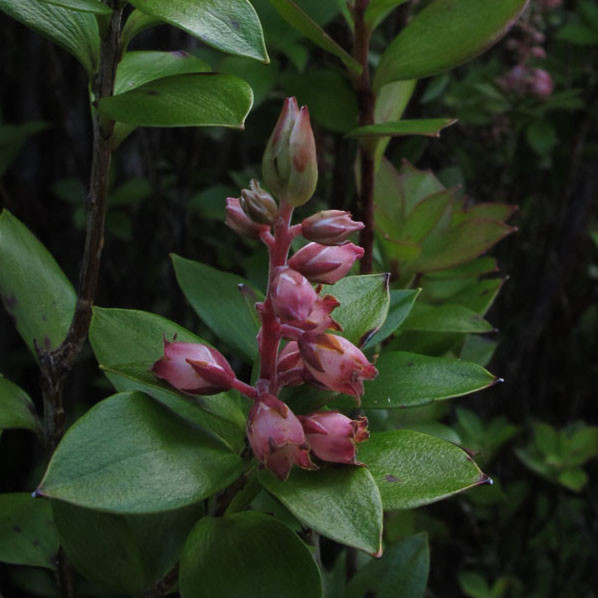
- Archeria racemosa on Little Barrier Island, New Zealand

Scientific classification
- Kingdom: Plantae
- Clade: Tracheophytes
- Clade: Angiosperms
- Clade: Eudicots
- Clade: Asterids
- Order: Ericales
- Family: Ericaceae
- Subfamily: Epacridoideae
- Tribe: Archerieae; Crayn & Quinn
- Genus: Archeria; Hook.f.

= Archeria (plant) =

Genus of plants

Archeria is a small genus of shrubs in the family Ericaceae. As currently circumscribed the group includes six species, all native to southern Australasia. Four of these are endemic to Tasmania, and the other two endemic to New Zealand.

It does not contain any economically important taxa, but due to their attractive small tubular flowers, reticulate leaf venation, and limited distribution, the shrubs have a long history of being admired by Australasian naturalists.

== Species ==
- Archeria comberi Melville (Tasmania)
- Archeria eriocarpa Hook.f. (Tasmania)
- Archeria hirtella (Hook.f.) Hook.f. (Tasmania)
- Archeria racemosa Hook.f. (New Zealand)
- Archeria serpyllifolia Hook.f. (Tasmania)
- Archeria traversii (Hook.f.) Mueller (New Zealand)

== Distribution ==
Archeria can be found scattered throughout south, west, north and central Tasmania, but is largely absent from the east. In New Zealand the distribution is highly disjunct, with A. racemosa being found only in the northern North Island, and A. traversii being scattered locally throughout the South Island and Stewart Island.

== Ecology ==
Like most ericads, Archeria species are largely found on acidic soils. They grow at lowland to montane altitudes, although A. comberi and A. hirtella reach the sub-alpine in parts of their range. Five of the six species are found rather locally throughout shrublands and forests, while A.comberi is found in heaths, sedgelands, and wetlands.

== Morphology ==
Habit The six species of Archeria are all self-supporting shrubs with dark coloured bark. Leaves They have simple, alternately arranged glabrous leaves, with margins that are entire or serrulate. The leaves are unique within the Styphelioideae, being the only genus in the group to have reticulate venation. Inflorescence The flowers are pedicellate, and either in short terminal racemes or solitary and axillary towards the ends of the branches. Flowers and Fruits Flowers are 5-merous, with bracts and bracteoles that are often small and caducous. The ovary is deeply 5-lobed, with the style deeply inserted, nearly to the base. Capsules are loculicidally dehiscent, with many seeds, on basal or sub-basal placentae.

== Evolutionary history ==
Based on morphology, and chloroplastic matK and rbcL DNA sequence data, Archeria is found to be nested within the subfamily Styphelioideae of the Ericaceae. The genus is sister to the rest of the subfamily, except for the tribe Prionoteae, which is sister to the rest of the subfamily and Archeria. It is regarded as distinct enough, both in terms of morphological and molecular data, to warrant monotypic status within its own tribe, the Archerieae.

== Etymology ==
The genus was named by Joseph Dalton Hooker in 1844 after the nineteenth century Tasmanian botanist William Archer.
