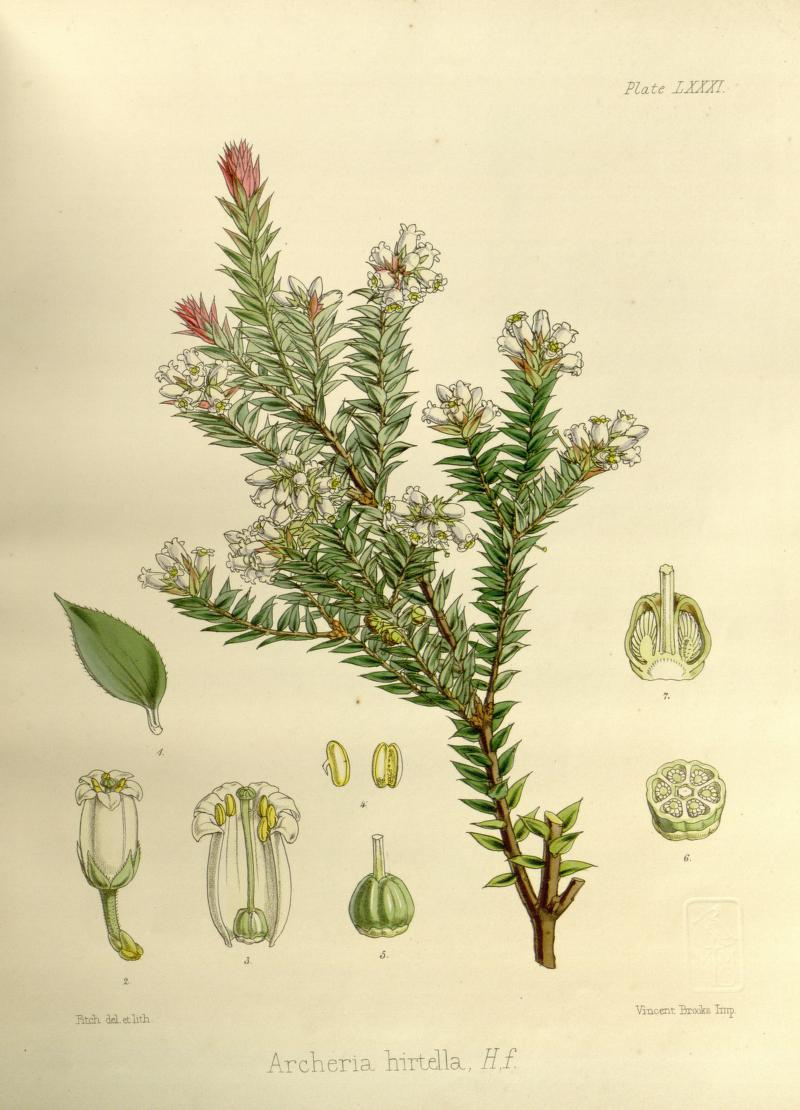
- Plate LXXXI (Fitch)

Scientific classification
- Kingdom: Plantae
- Clade: Tracheophytes
- Clade: Angiosperms
- Clade: Eudicots
- Clade: Asterids
- Order: Ericales
- Family: Ericaceae
- Genus: Archeria
- Species: A. hirtella

Binomial name
- Archeria hirtella (Hook. f.) Hook. f

Synonyms
- Epacris hirtella Hook.f.

= Archeria hirtella =

Species of flowering plant

Archeria hirtella is a species of shrub in the family Ericaceae. It is native to Tasmania, Australia.

== Taxonomy ==
Joseph Hooker first described it in 1847 as Epacris hirtella from a specimen collected in Macquarie Harbour by Gunn, but in 1860 he assigned it to the genus, Archeria.
