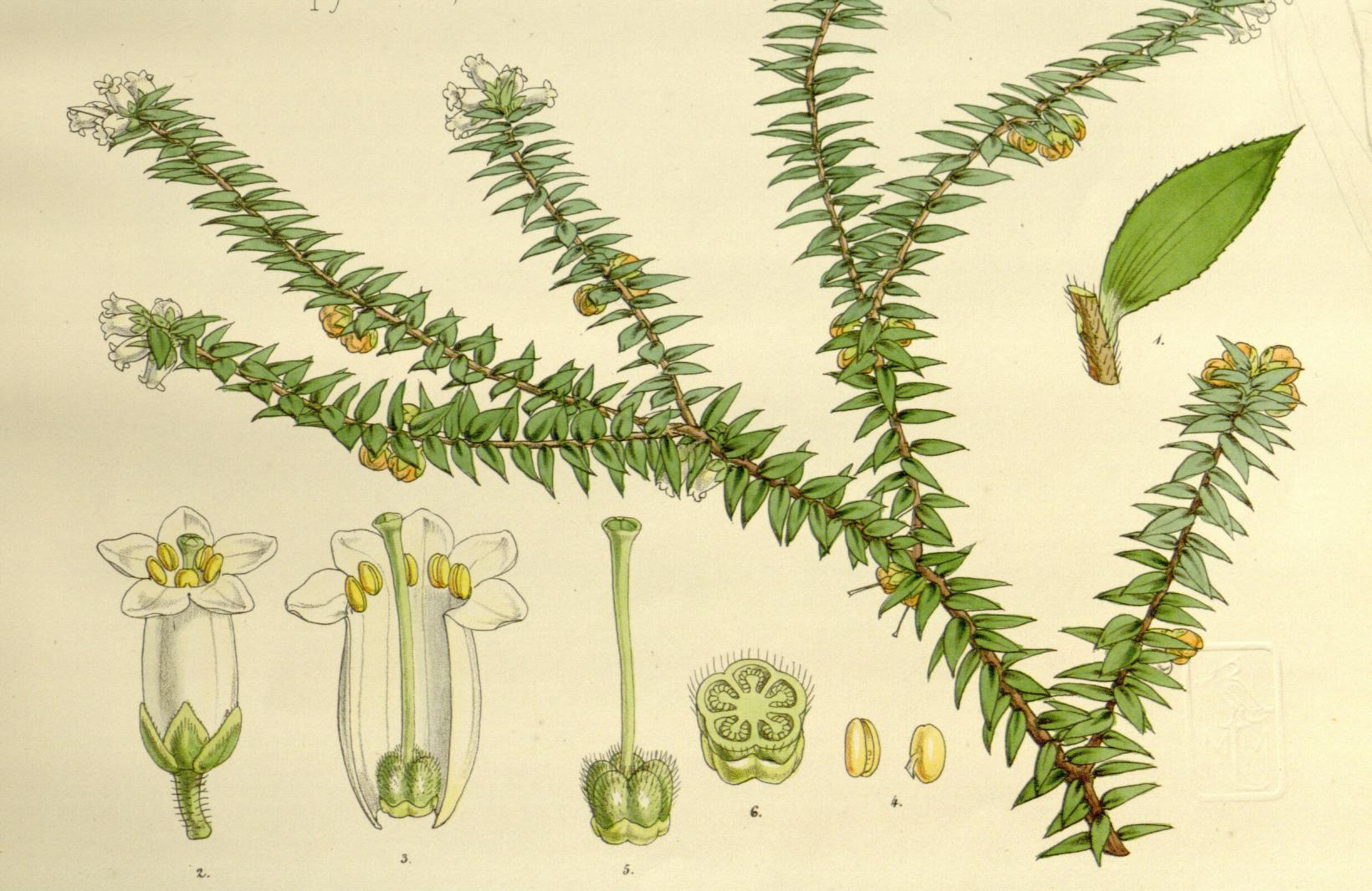
- Tab LXXX B

Scientific classification
- Kingdom: Plantae
- Clade: Tracheophytes
- Clade: Angiosperms
- Clade: Eudicots
- Clade: Asterids
- Order: Ericales
- Family: Ericaceae
- Genus: Archeria
- Species: A. eriocarpa

Binomial name
- Archeria eriocarpa Hook.f.

= Archeria eriocarpa =

Species of flowering plant

Archeria eriocarpa is a species of shrub in the family Ericaceae. It is endemic to Tasmania, Australia.
