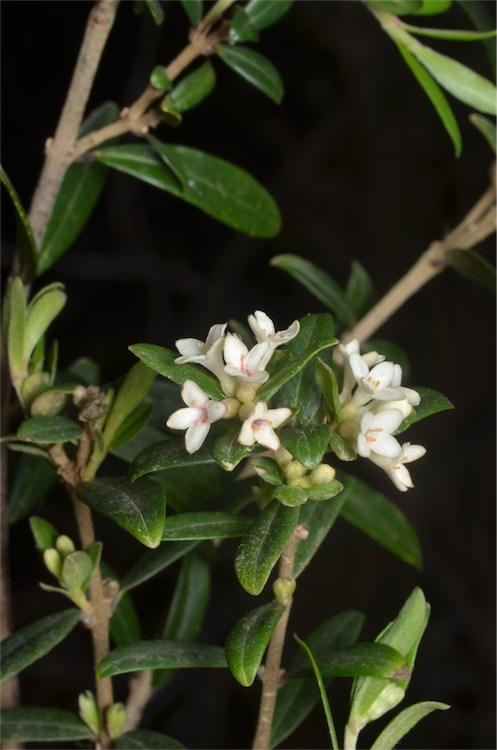
- Pimelea drupacea in south-western Tasmania

Scientific classification
- Kingdom: Plantae
- Clade: Tracheophytes
- Clade: Angiosperms
- Clade: Eudicots
- Clade: Rosids
- Order: Malvales
- Family: Thymelaeaceae
- Genus: Pimelea
- Species: P. drupacea

Binomial name
- Pimelea drupacea Labill.

Synonyms
- Banksia drupacea (Labill.) Kuntze; Gymnococca drupacea (Labill.) Fisch. & C.A.Mey.; Gymnococca drupacea (Labill.) C.A.Mey. isonym; Pimelea drupacea Labill. var. drupacea

= Pimelea drupacea =

Cherry rice-flower

Species of shrub

Pimelea drupacea, commonly known as cherry rice-flower, is a species of flowering plant in the family Thymelaeaceae and is endemic to south-eastern Australia. It is a shrub with elliptic leaves arranged in opposite pairs, and head-like clusters of white, tube-shaped flowers surrounded by two or four leaves.

== Description ==
Pimelea drupacea is a shrub that typically grows to a height of 1–3 m (3 ft 3 in – 9 ft 10 in), its young stems covered with short hairs. The leaves are arranged in opposite pairs, elliptic to narrowly elliptic, 5–70 mm (0.20–2.76 in) long and 2–14.5 mm (0.079–0.571 in) wide on a short petiole. The flowers are white and borne in head-like clusters of 4 to 12, surrounded by two or four leaves 4.5–39 mm (0.18–1.54 in) long, each flower on a densely hairy pedicel. The floral tube is 4.5–5.5 mm (0.18–0.22 in) long, the sepals 1.8–3.5 mm (0.071–0.138 in) long and the fruit red and succulent. Flowering time is variously reported as August to October, mainly from September to January, or in late spring.

== Taxonomy ==
Pimelea drupacea was first formally described in 1805 by Jacques Labillardière in his Novae Hollandiae Plantarum Specimen. The specific epithet (drupacea) means "drupe-like".

== Distribution and habitat ==
Cherry rice-flower grows in moist, shady valleys and occurs on Wilsons Promontory in Victoria and is widespread and common in Tasmania, including on King Island.

== Conservation status ==
This pimelea is listed as "critically endangered" in Victoria, under the Victorian Government Flora and Fauna Guarantee Act 1988.
