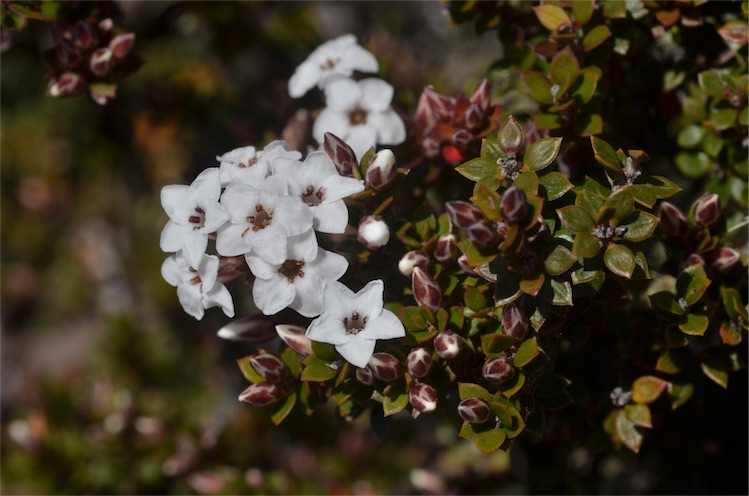

Scientific classification
- Kingdom: Plantae
- Clade: Tracheophytes
- Clade: Angiosperms
- Clade: Eudicots
- Clade: Asterids
- Order: Ericales
- Family: Ericaceae
- Genus: Epacris
- Species: E. serpyllifolia

Binomial name
- Epacris serpyllifolia R.Br.

Synonyms
- Epacris serpyllifolia R.Br. var. serpyllifolia

= Epacris serpyllifolia =

Species of flowering plant

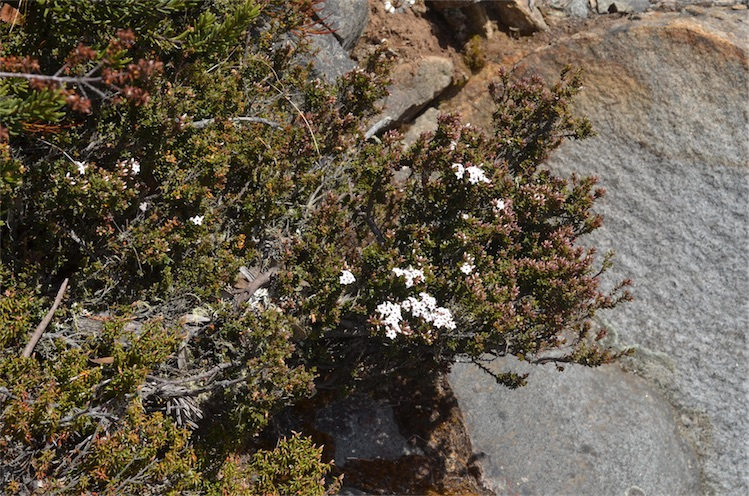
Near the summit of Mount Wellington

Epacris serpyllifolia is a species of flowering plant in the heath family Ericaceae and is endemic to Tasmania. It is a small low-lying or weakly erect shrub with heart-shaped to broadly egg-shaped leaves and tube-shaped white flowers crowded in upper leaf axils.

== Description ==
Epacris serpyllifolia is a prostrate, low-lying or weakly erect, sometimes bushy shrub that typically grows to a height of up to 30 cm (12 in). Its leaves are egg-shaped, 2–6 mm (0.079–0.236 in) long, sometimes with a short point on the end. The flowers are borne in leaf axils near the ends of branches with often coloured sepals about 3 mm (0.12 in) long. The petal tube is slightly longer than the sepals and the petal lobes are shorter than the petal tube, and the anthers sometimes slightly longer than the petal tube.

== Taxonomy ==
Epacris serpyllifolia was first formally described in 1810 by Robert Brown in his Prodromus Florae Novae Hollandiae. The specific epithet (serpyllifolia) means "wild thyme-leaved".

== Distribution ==
This epacris is endemic to Tasmania where it is widespread and abundant in alpine and subalpine areas.
