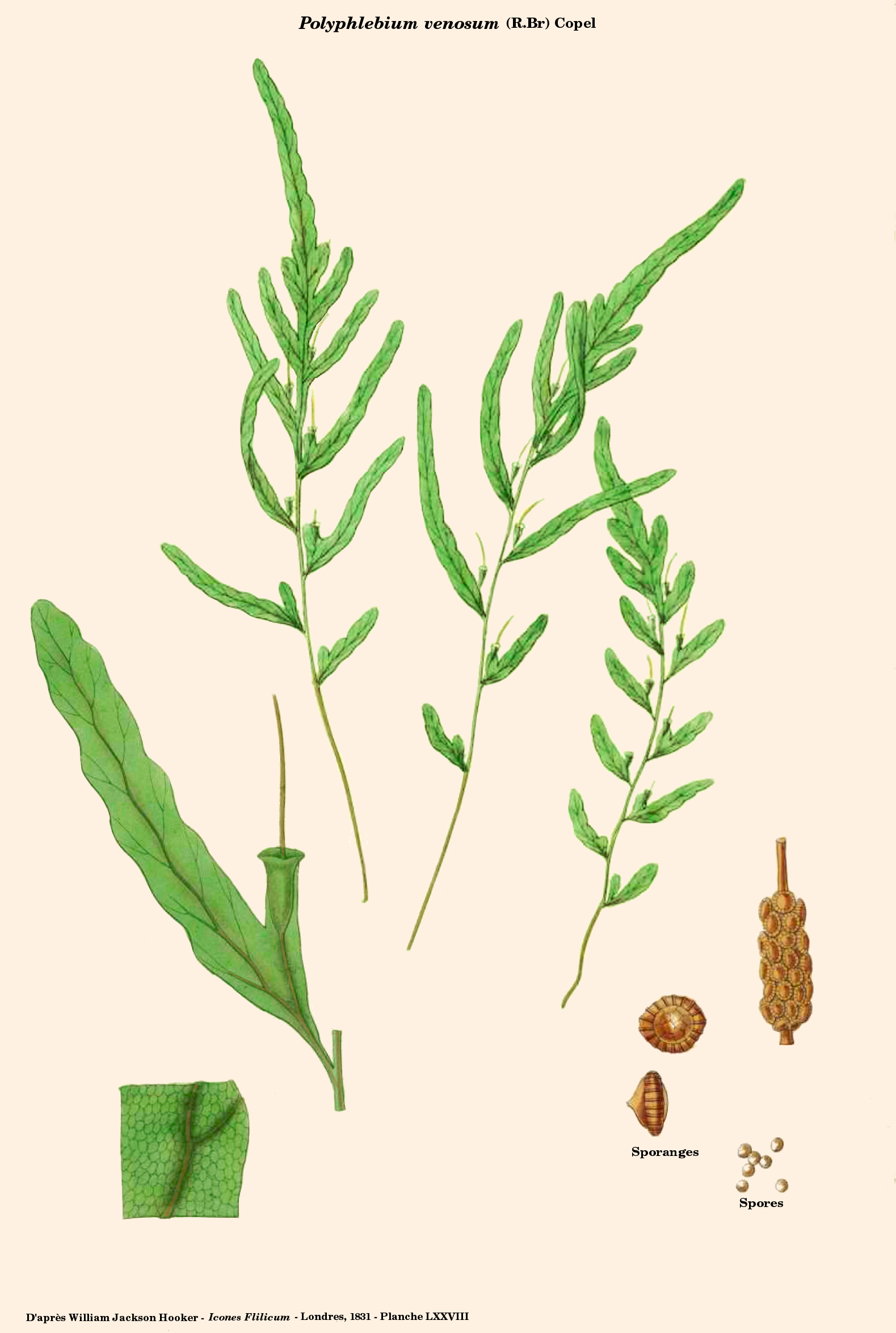

Scientific classification
- Kingdom: Plantae
- Clade: Tracheophytes
- Division: Polypodiophyta
- Class: Polypodiopsida
- Order: Hymenophyllales
- Family: Hymenophyllaceae
- Genus: Polyphlebium
- Species: P. venosum

Binomial name
- Polyphlebium venosum (R.Br.) Copel.

Synonyms
- Trichomanes venosum R.Br.; Phlebiophyllum venustum Bosch; Crepidomanes venosum (R.Br.) Bostock; Trichomanes venustulum Colenso

= Polyphlebium venosum =

Species of fern

Polyphlebium venosum, the veined bristle-fern or bristle filmy fern, is a fern in the family Hymenophyllaceae. It is only found in wet forests, mainly growing as an epiphyte on the shady side of the soft tree fern, Dicksonia antarctica. It also grows on logs, trunks of trees and rarely on trunks of Cyathea species or on wet rock-faces. It is found in the wetter parts of Eastern Australia and New Zealand. P. venosum has poor long-distance dispersal compared to other ferns due to its short lived spore. Notable features of Polyphlebium venosum include it being one cell layer thick, 5–15 cm in length, having many branching veins and a trumpet shaped indusium.

== Description ==
The sporophyte stage has rhizome branched and creeping, very fine, densely covered with tiny, pale brown hairs. Fronds well spaced, pendent, 5–15 cm long, delicate and translucent; stipe and rachis thread-like. Lamina pale green, long and narrow, irregular in outline and simply lobed to pinnately divided; pinnae sometimes very long and hanging almost parallel to main rachis, lower pinnae often very small and widely spaced. Margins of pinnae or segments wavy or broadly crenate; ultimate segments blunt and broad (2–6 mm); veins prominent and repeatedly forked. Sori marginal and immersed, borne singly on short lateral lobes near base of pinna; indusium narrowly trumpet-shaped, 2–4 mm long; fine receptacle projecting 10 mm or more.

The gametophyte is a branching uniseriate filament and bears numerous, small, stalked antheridia, each with a simple wall and an operculum which is raised or shed to allow the spermatozoids to escape. The archegonia, with straight necks and tiers of four to six neck cells, are borne on special structures, the archegoniophores.

== Taxonomy ==
The species was first described by Robert Brown in 1810, as Trichomanes venosum. The precise circumscription of the genus Trichomanes varies considerably between sources. As of October 2019, the Checklist of Ferns and Lycophytes of the World followed the Pteridophyte Phylogeny Group classification of 2016 (PPG I) in using a narrow circumscription of Trichomanes, and placed this species in Polyphlebium as P. venosum. It has also been placed in the genus Crepidomanes (another of the eight genera into which Trichomanes is divided in PPG I) as Crepidomanes venosum. On the other hand, as of October 2019, Plants of the World Online used a broad circumscription of Trichomanes, so retaining Brown's original name.

== Ecology and lifecycle ==
Due to Polyphlebium venosum being only one cell layer thick, it is heavily prone to desiccation in hot or dry environments. This is one of the main reasons that it grows as a mat on the shaded side of Dicksonia antarctica.

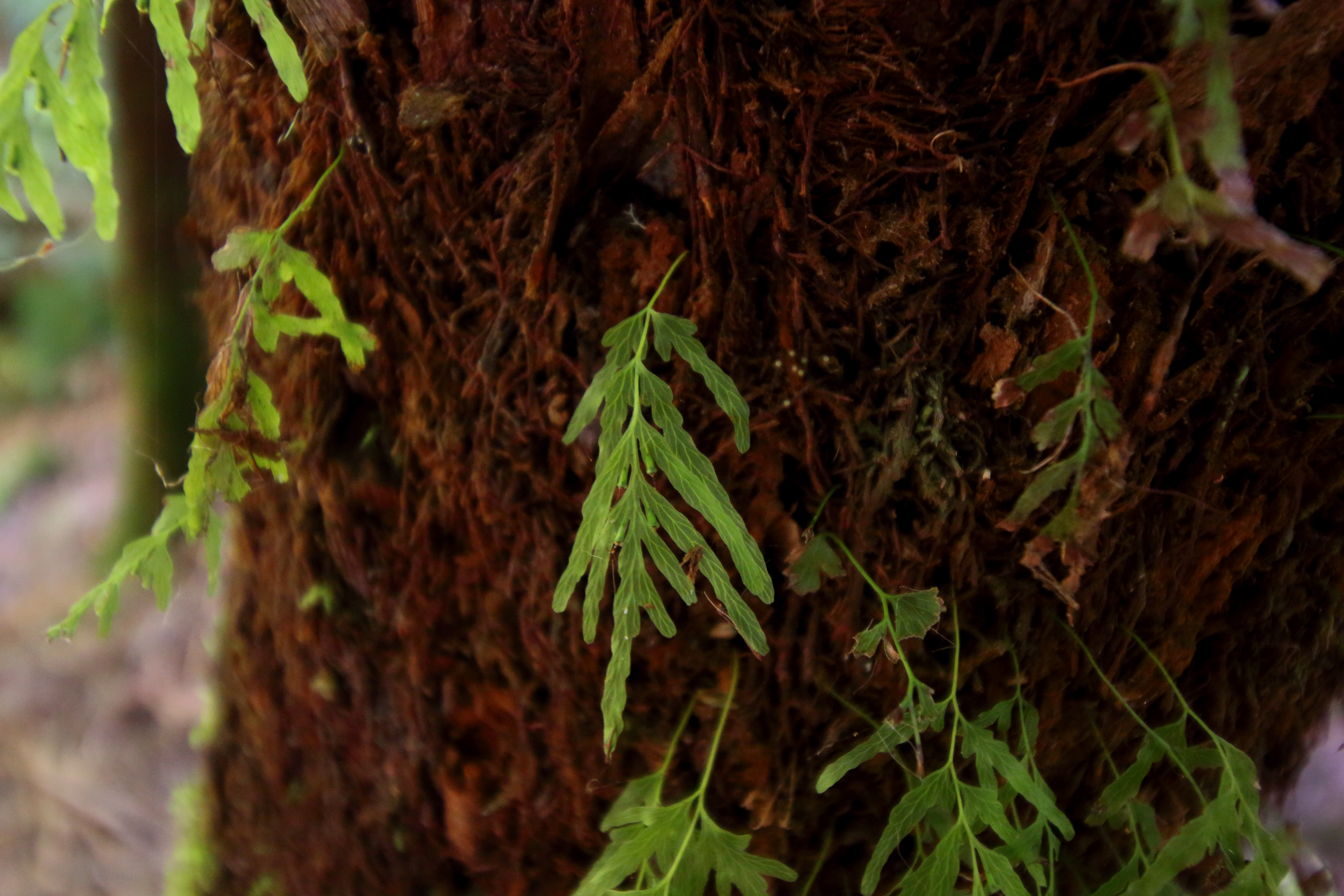
Growing on the underside of a man fern. Trumpet shaped indusium can be seen near the base of the pinna.

P. venosum is at no threat of worldwide extinction, but extreme events like large-scale wildfires can reduce population sizes and exacerbate the effect of anthropogenic disturbances. Due to its heavy reliance on D. antarctica the species has a limited dispersion rate which can be halted by dry landscapes acting as geological boundaries. Like other ferns, P. venosum undergoes alteration of generations which consists of two sexual stages - the diploid sporophyte and the haploid gametophyte. The sporophyte stage of P. venosum consists of adult ferns which release numerous spores. These spores then settle on the trunks of D. antarctica in a moist and sheltered habitat. Spores germinate within a few days and form a one cell layer thick, 'heart-shaped' prothallus. In ferns, the time required for the prothallus to sexually mature may require several months to several years of development. The male antheridia matures and releases its gametes earlier than the female archegonia in an effort to avoid self-fertilisation. The prothallus can reproduce asexually through the release of gemmae which on germination produce rhizoids, filaments and antheridia or more gemmae. The prothallus can also reproduce itself vegetatively by regeneration. Once established, P. venosum spreads to surrounding substrate through its extensively creeping rhizomes.

Spores of P. venosum take two days to germinate after sowing and are on average only viable for 48 days. After two weeks, only 1/10 billion of the original spores survive. Distribution of the spores places 90% in the immediate vicinity of the parent sporophyte. The short lived nature of P. venosum's spores compared to other ferns reduces their likelihood for long-distance dispersal.

== Distribution ==
Polyphlebium venosum is only found in wet forests in Australia and New Zealand. In Australia, the distribution is restricted to the Eastern states of Tasmania, Victoria, New South Wales and Queensland.
