= Arthur-Pieman Conservation Area =

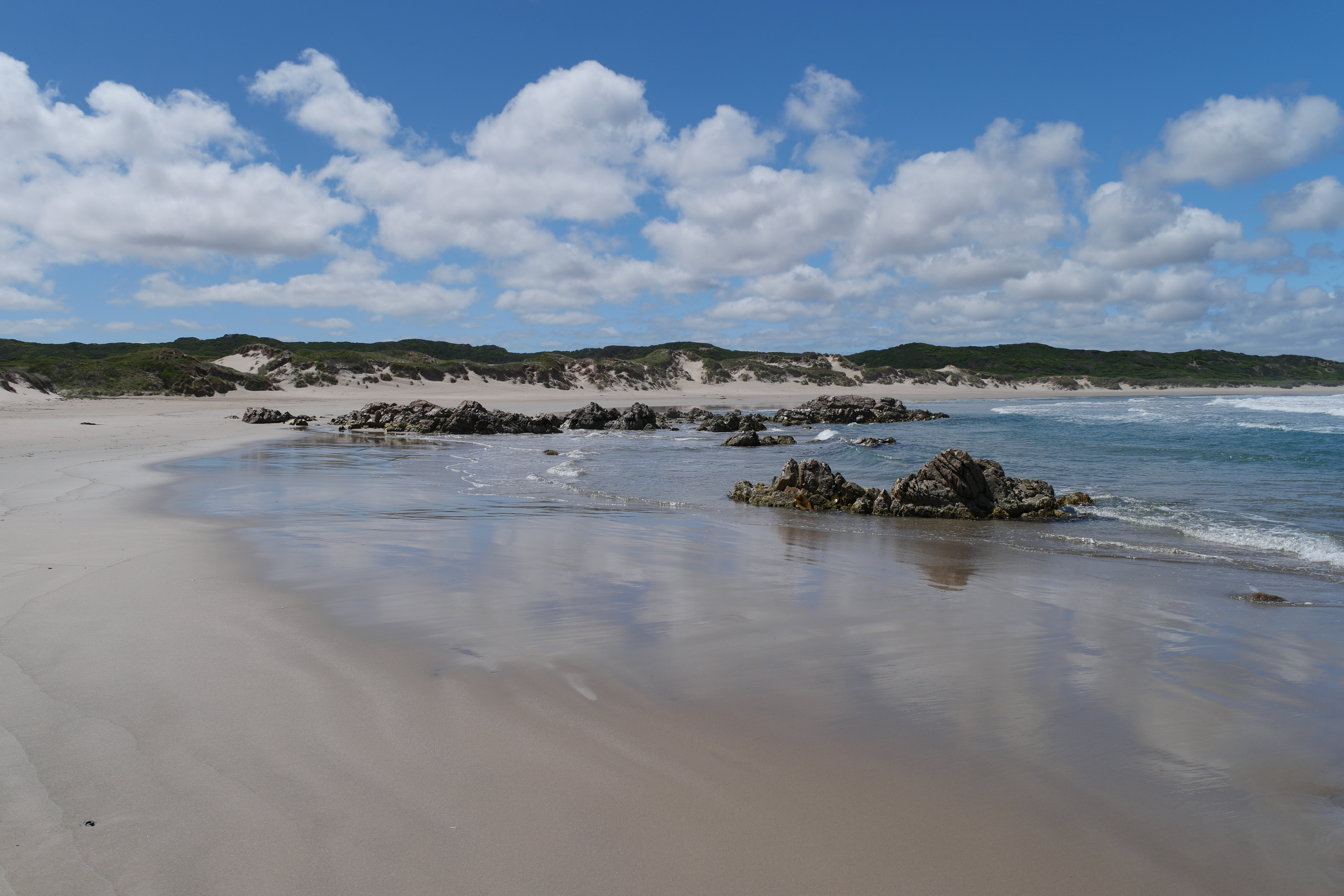

- Location within Tasmania
- Location: Tasmania
- Coordinates: 41.381°S 144.88°E
- Area: 1,030 km^{2} (400 sq mi)
- Established: 1982
- Website: https://parks.tas.gov.au/explore-our-parks/arthur-pieman-conservation-area

The Arthur–Pieman Conservation Area (APCA) stretches along West Coast Tasmania, covering over 1,030 square kilometres (400 sq mi). Much of the reserve is between the Arthur River in the north, the Pieman River in the south and the Frankland and Donaldson Rivers to the east. It is a dynamic landscape which is being continually reshaped by wind, fire and water.

The area has a rich Aboriginal heritage which has left markers in the landscape, such as middens, hut depressions, artefact scatters and rock art. These special places and their associated cultural landscapes show that Aboriginal people in the past had a special relationship with the land - a relationship which continues with Aboriginal people today.

The Arthur–Pieman Conservation Area provides a range of opportunities for recreation, from surfing and diving to recreational off-road driving and fishing.
