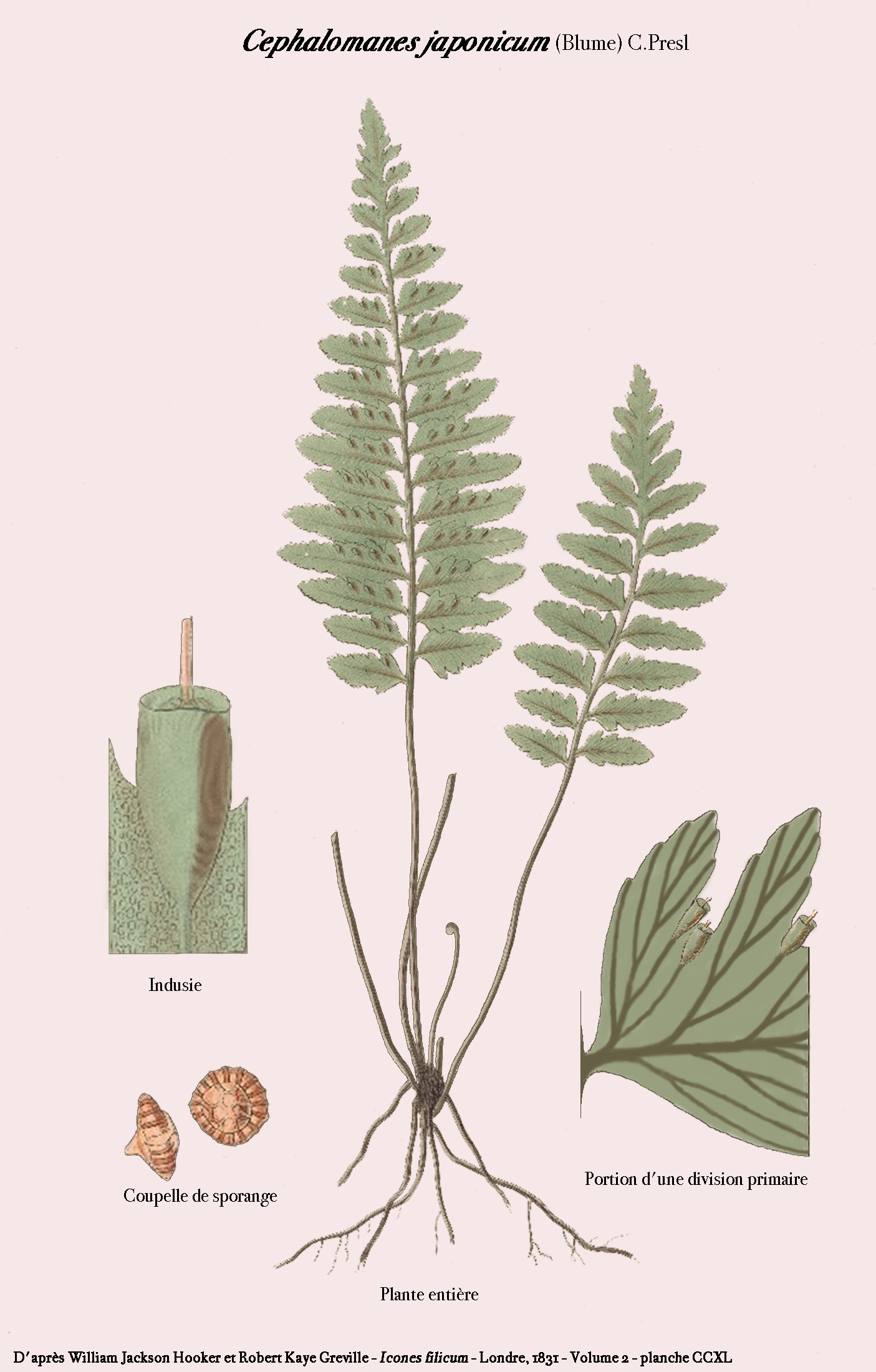
- Cephalomanes javanicum

Scientific classification
- Kingdom: Plantae
- Clade: Tracheophytes
- Division: Polypodiophyta
- Class: Polypodiopsida
- Order: Hymenophyllales
- Family: Hymenophyllaceae
- Subfamily: Trichomanoideae
- Genus: Cephalomanes; C.Presl

Type species
- Cephalomanes atrovirens Presl

Species
- See text

= Cephalomanes =

Genus of ferns

Cephalomanes is a fern genus in the family Hymenophyllaceae. The genus is accepted in the Pteridophyte Phylogeny Group classification of 2016 (PPG I) but not by other sources, which sink it into a broadly defined Trichomanes.

== Taxonomy ==
The genus Cephalomanes was erected by Carl Presl in 1843. Its status, like other genera in the family Hymenophyllaceae, remains disputed. The Pteridophyte Phylogeny Group classification of 2016 (PPG I) accepts the genus, placing it in the subfamily Trichomanoideae, and saying that there are four species. As of October 2019, the Checklist of Ferns and Lycophytes of the World lists nine species, whereas Plants of the World Online sinks the genus into Trichomanes.

=== Species ===
As of October 2019, the Checklist of Ferns and Lycophytes of the World accepted the following species:

- Cephalomanes atrovirens C.Presl
- Cephalomanes crassum (Copel.) M.G.Price
- Cephalomanes densinervium (Copel.) Copel.
- Cephalomanes infundibulare (Alderw.) comb. ined.
- Cephalomanes javanicum (Blume) C Presl
- Cephalomanes ledermannii (Brause) Copel.
- Cephalomanes maluense (Brause) comb. ined.
- Cephalomanes singaporianum Bosch
- Cephalomanes suffrutex (Alderw.) comb. ined.

Formerly placed here:

- Cephalomanes bauerianum (Endl.) P.S.Green = Callistopteris baueriana (Endl.) Copel.
- Cephalomanes elegans (Rich.) K.Iwats. = Trichomanes elegans Rich.

== See also ==
- List of fern families
