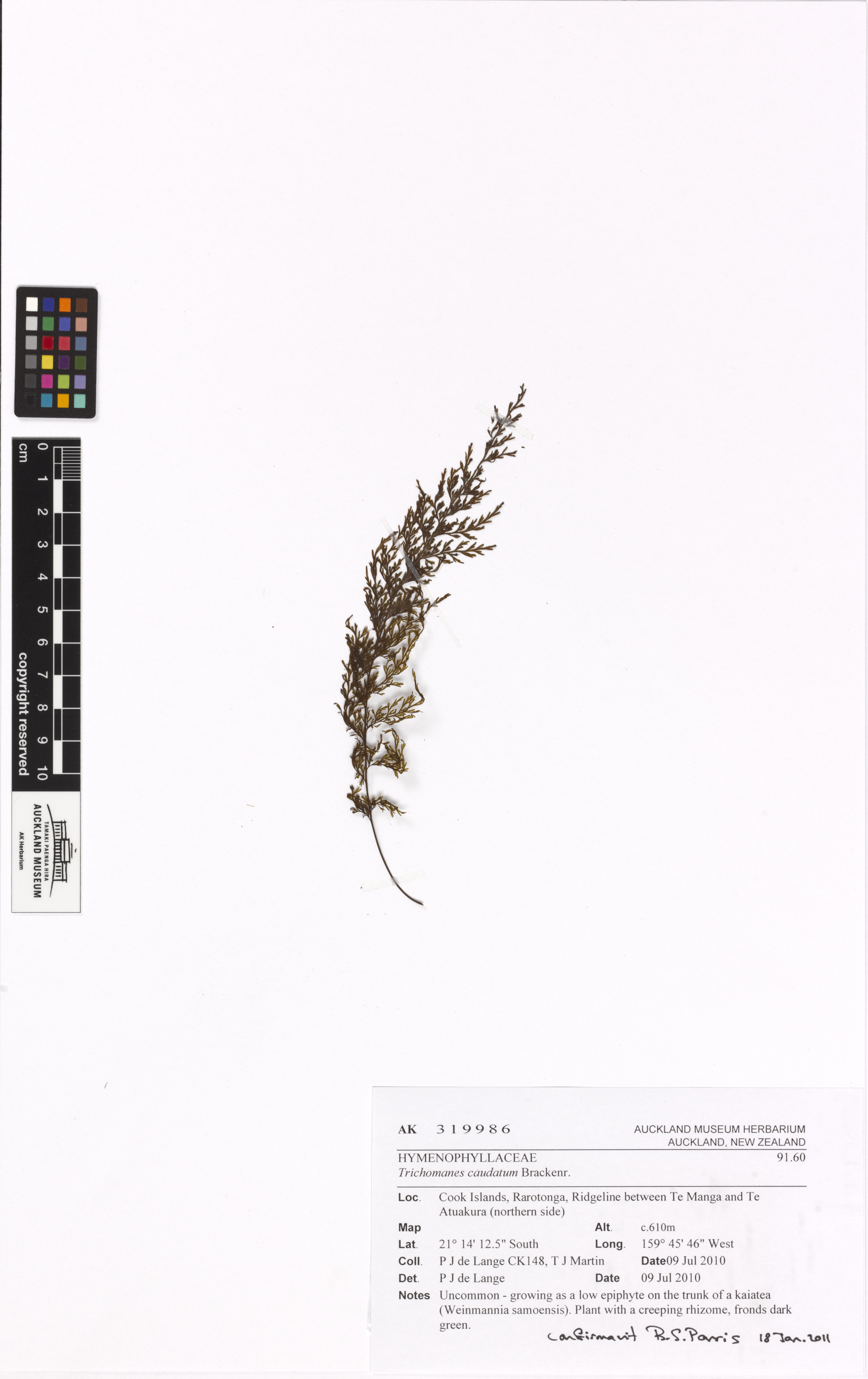

Conservation status
- Least Concern (IUCN 3.1)

Scientific classification
- Kingdom: Plantae
- Clade: Embryophytes
- Clade: Tracheophytes
- Division: Polypodiophyta
- Class: Polypodiopsida
- Order: Hymenophyllales
- Family: Hymenophyllaceae
- Genus: Abrodictyum
- Species: A. caudatum

Binomial name
- Abrodictyum caudatum (Brack.) Ebihara K.Iwats.

Synonyms
- Cephalomanes caudatum (Brack.) Bostock; Macroglena caudata (Brack.) Copel.; Trichomanes caudatum Brack.

= Abrodictyum caudatum =

Species of fern

Abrodictyum caudatum is an epiphytic fern, found in rainforests in eastern Australia.

== Taxonomy ==
The species was first described as Trichomanes caudatum by William Brackenridge in 1854, based on material collected in Tahiti by the United States Exploring Expedition. Filmy ferns (family Hymenophyllaceae) were historically divided into two genera, Trichomanes and Hymenophyllum by most pteridologists, based largely on the morphology of their indusia. After reviewing the Old World species of filmy ferns, Edwin Copeland came to believe that this arrangement was arbitrary, with a continuum of variation between indusial shapes, and lumped together disparate elements in each genus. Accordingly, he published a revised treatment of the family in 1938, splitting it into no less than thirty-three genera. One of these was the former Trichomanes subgenus Macroglena; he assigned T. caudatum there as Macroglena caudata.

While Copeland's system was adopted by some botanists, others considered his genera to be unduly narrow. Kunio Iwatsuki's system of 1984 consolidated several of Copeland's genera, including Macroglena, into Cephalomanes. Peter Bostock transferred T. caudatum to that genus as Cephalomanes caudatum in the Flora of Australia treatment in 1998. The advent of molecular techniques allowed Atsushi Ebihara and coworkers to redefine filmy fern genera based on molecular phylogeny. Their classification retained the traditional Hymenophyllum while dividing Trichomanes sensu lato into nine genera. They adopted a narrower classification of Cephalomanes, placing T. caudatum in Abrodictyum subg. Abrodictyum as A. caudatum. Subsequent authors have typically either used this name for the species or, reverting to the bigeneric system, T. caudatum.

In 1861, Roelof van den Bosch described the species Trichomanes milnei based on a collection from Balade, New Caledonia. It has subsequently been treated as a synonym of A. caudatum, although Mary Tindale felt that it probably warranted recognition as a distinct species.
