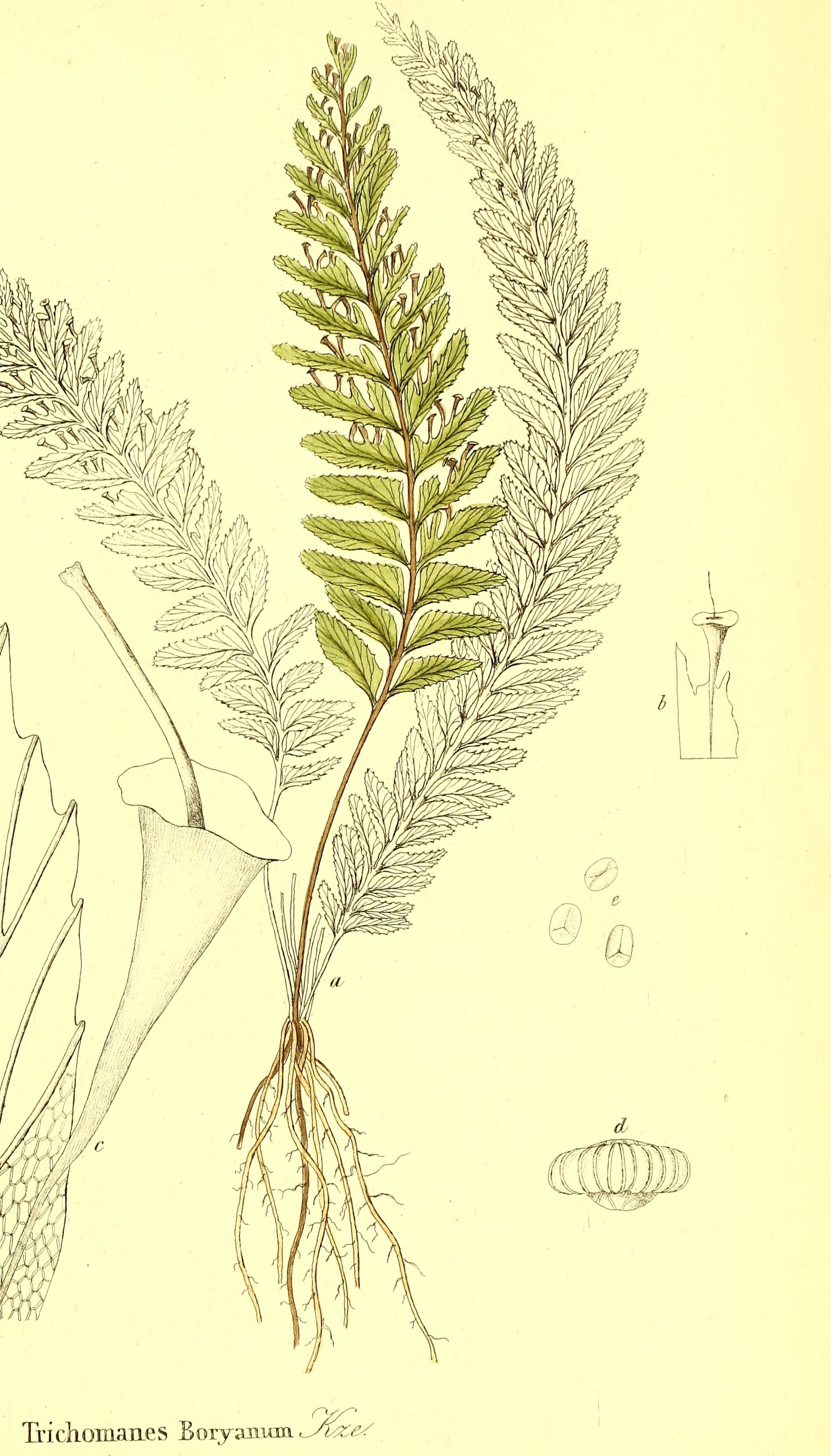
- 1840 illustration (as Trichomanes boryanum)

Scientific classification
- Kingdom: Plantae
- Clade: Embryophytes
- Clade: Tracheophytes
- Division: Polypodiophyta
- Class: Polypodiopsida
- Order: Hymenophyllales
- Family: Hymenophyllaceae
- Genus: Cephalomanes
- Species: C. atrovirens

Binomial name
- Cephalomanes atrovirens C.Presl

Synonyms
- See text.

= Cephalomanes atrovirens =

Species of plant

Cephalomanes atrovirens is a species of fern in the family Hymenophyllaceae. The genus Cephalomanes is accepted in the Pteridophyte Phylogeny Group classification of 2016 (PPG I), but not by some other sources. As of October 2019, Plants of the World Online sank the genus into a broadly defined Trichomanes, while treating the subtaxa of this species as the separate species Trichomanes acrosorum, Trichomanes atrovirens, Trichomanes boryanum and Trichomanes kingii.

== Subtaxa ==
Two subspecies and two forms have been recognized, all of which have been recognized as separate species in the genus Trichomanes by other sources:

- Cephalomanes atrovirens ssp. atrovirens, syn. Trichomanes atrovirens (C.Presl) Kunze

Other synonyms:
- Cephalomanes rhomboideum J.Sm. ex Bosch
- Trichomanes rhomboideum J.Sm.

- Cephalomanes atrovirens ssp. boryanum (Kunze) K.Iwats., syn. Trichomanes boryanum Kunze

Other synonyms:
- Cephalomanes alatum C.Presl
- Cephalomanes australicum Bosch
- Cephalomanes boryanum (Kunze) Bosch
- Cephalomanes wilkesii Bosch
- Lacostea boryana Prantl
- Trichomanes alatum Bory
- Trichomanes australicum (Bosch) Copel.
- Trichomanes javanicum var. boryanum (Kunze) Fosberg

- Cephalomanes atrovirens f. acrosorum (Copel.) K.Iwats., syn. Trichomanes acrosorum Copel.

Other synonyms:
- Cephalomanes acrosorum (Copel.) Copel.

- Cephalomanes atrovirens f. kingii (Copel.) K.Iwats., syn. Trichomanes kingii Copel.

Other synonyms:
- Cephalomanes kingii (Copel.) Copel.

== Distribution ==
The species as a whole is native to the Ryukyu Islands, Malesia (the Philippines and Sulawesi), Papuasia (New Guinea, the Bismarck Archipelago, and the Solomon Islands), the northwestern Pacific (the Mariana Islands, Palau, the Caroline Islands, and the Federated States of Micronesia), the southwestern Pacific (Fiji, Samoa, Tonga, the Santa Cruz Islands, and Vanuatu) and eastern Australia (Queensland, New South Wales, Norfolk Island, and Lord Howe Island).

The two subspecies recognized by the Checklist of Ferns and Lycophytes of the World have distinct distributions. C. atrovirens subsp. atrovirens is native to the Ryukyu Islands, eastern tropical Asia (New Guinea, the Philippines, the Santa Cruz Islands, the Solomon Islands, Sulawesi, Vanuatu) and eastern Australia (Queensland, New South Wales, Norfolk Island and Lord Howe Island). C. atrovirens subsp. boryanum is found further east, being native to New Guinea, the Bismarck Archipelago and islands of the western Pacific (the Caroline Islands, Fiji, the Mariana Islands, Samoa, Tonga, and Vanuatu).

The two forms have a narrower distribution. Both are found in New Guinea. C. atrovirens f. acrosorum is also native to Micronesia and the Solomon Islands, whereas C. atrovirens f. kingii is also native to the Santa Cruz Islands.
