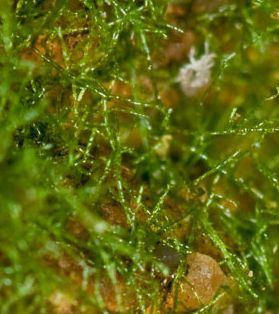

Conservation status
- Apparently Secure (NatureServe)

Scientific classification
- Kingdom: Plantae
- Clade: Embryophytes
- Clade: Tracheophytes
- Division: Polypodiophyta
- Class: Polypodiopsida
- Order: Hymenophyllales
- Family: Hymenophyllaceae
- Genus: Crepidomanes
- Species: C. intricatum

Binomial name
- Crepidomanes intricatum (Farrar) Ebihara & Weakley

Synonyms
- Trichomanes intricatum Farrar

= Crepidomanes intricatum =

Weft fern

Species of fern

Crepidomanes intricatum, synonym Trichomanes intricatum, is known as the weft fern. The genus Crepidomanes is accepted in the Pteridophyte Phylogeny Group classification of 2016 (PPG I), but not by some other sources. As of October 2019, Plants of the World Online sank the genus into a broadly defined Trichomanes, treating this species as Trichomanes intricatum.

This is an unusual filmy fern that grows in rock shelters and crevices in the eastern United States, with the southern extent in Georgia and extending north into New England. It is known only from its filamentous gametophytes and completely lacks the sporophyte generation. It is a rare plant that is protected in several US states.

Recent study has found a relationship between this species and an Asian filmy-fern species, Crepidomanes schmidianum. Both share the same chloroplast genome, although the relationship between the two species is uncertain. In 2011, Atsushi Ebihara and Alan S. Weakley transferred Trichomanes intricatum to Crepidomanes intricatum based on the chloroplast molecular sequence data.

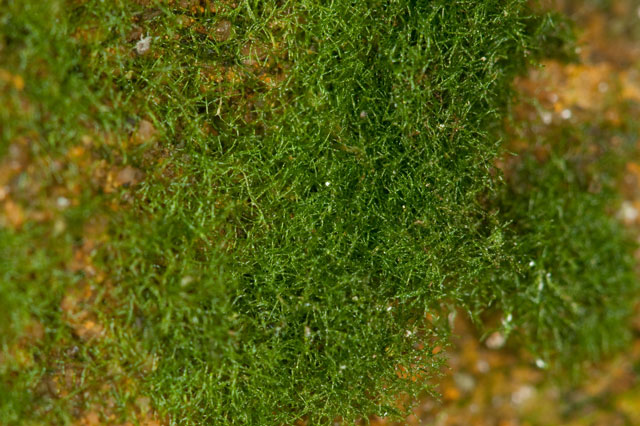

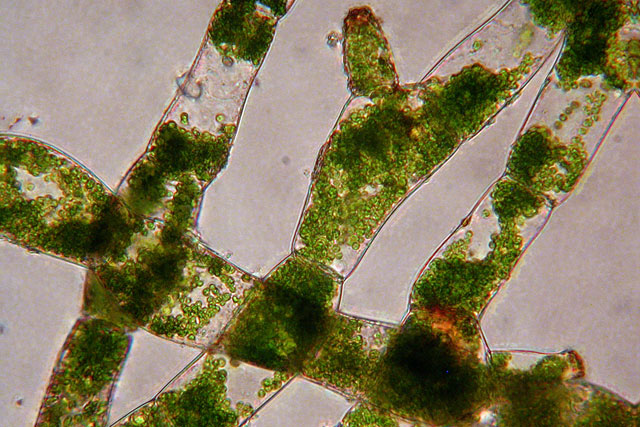
Closeup
