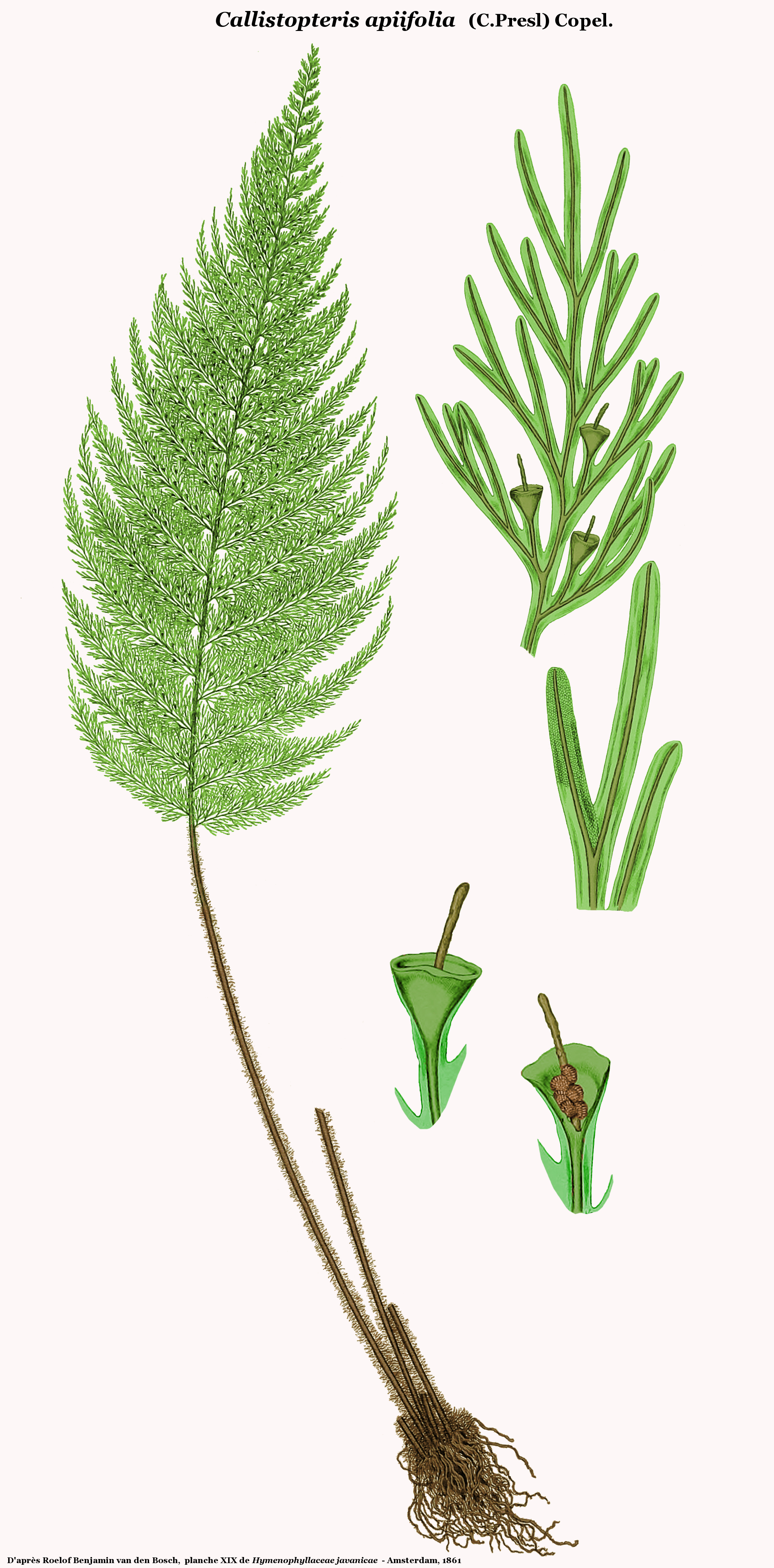
- Illustration of Callistopteris apiifolia

Scientific classification
- Kingdom: Plantae
- Clade: Tracheophytes
- Division: Polypodiophyta
- Class: Polypodiopsida
- Order: Hymenophyllales
- Family: Hymenophyllaceae
- Subfamily: Trichomanoideae
- Genus: Callistopteris; Copel.

Type species
- Callistopteris apiifolia (Presl) Copeland

Species
- See text.

= Callistopteris =

Genus of ferns

Callistopteris is a fern genus in the family Hymenophyllaceae. The genus is accepted in the Pteridophyte Phylogeny Group classification of 2016 (PPG I) but not by some other sources, which sink it into a broadly defined Trichomanes.

== Taxonomy ==
The genus Callistopteris was erected by Edwin Copeland in 1938. Its status, like other genera in the family Hymenophyllaceae, remains disputed. The Pteridophyte Phylogeny Group classification of 2016 (PPG I) accepts the genus, placing it in the subfamily Trichomanoideae, and saying that there are five species. As of October 2019, the Checklist of Ferns and Lycophytes of the World lists six species, whereas Plants of the World Online sinks the genus into Trichomanes.

=== Species ===
As of October 2026, the Checklist of Ferns and Lycophytes of the World and World Flora Online recognize 5 species in Callistopteris. Plants of the World Online recognizes these 5 species in a broadly circumscribed Trichomanes.

- Callistopteris apiifolia (C.Presl) Copel.
- Callistopteris baldwinii (D.C.Eaton) Copel.
- Callistopteris baueriana (Endl.) Copel.
- Callistopteris calyculata Copel.
- Callistopteris societensis (J.W.Moore) comb. ined.

== See also ==
- List of fern families
