= Leptotrema =

Scientific classification
- Kingdom: Fungi
- Division: Ascomycota
- Class: Lecanoromycetes
- Order: Graphidales
- Family: Graphidaceae
- Genus: Leptotrema; Mont. & Bosch (1856)

Type species
- Leptotrema zollingeri Mont. & Bosch (1855)

Genus of lichen-forming fungi

Leptotrema is a genus of lichen-forming fungi in the family Graphidaceae. The genus has undergone significant taxonomic changes since its establishment in 1856, including being merged with other genera and later separated again based on molecular studies. Leptotrema lichens typically grow on bark or leaves and are characterized by their warted surface appearance and small, dark ascospores contained within immersed fruiting bodies. The genus currently includes 15 recognized species found in various tropical and subtropical regions.

== Taxonomy ==
The genus was circumscribed in 1856 by Camille Montagne and Roelof Benjamin van den Bosch, with Leptotrema zollingeri assigned as the type species. Subsequent research on the genus has revealed a convoluted taxonomic history. For much of the twentieth century Leptotrema was treated as a catch-all for Graphidaceae species with small, brown, muriform spores, before Mason Hale (1980, 1981) sank it into synonymy with Myriotrema. A broad revision of the family in 2006 resurrected the genus, but only for the widespread taxon then called L. wightii and nine putative synonyms. Molecular data showed that L. wightii formed a distinct lineage together with Reimnitzia santensis, leading authors to erect the tribe Leptotremateae around that pair. A re-examination of the type material, however, demonstrated that one of the supposed synonyms—Leptotrema zollingeri—differed from L. wightii in chemistry and key thallus features, suggesting the two were not even close relatives.

Because fresh DNA cannot be obtained from the mid-nineteenth-century type, Lücking and colleagues (2015) applied morphology-based phylogenetic binning to place L. zollingeri on a well-sampled molecular backbone. That analysis, with high statistical support, showed that the species sits inside the Myriotrema album clade of tribe Ocellularieae and is unrelated to L. wightii.

These results have sweeping nomenclatural consequences. Because the generic and tribal names are tied to L. zollingeri, Leptotrema must now refer to the M. album group, while Leptotremateae falls as a later synonym of Ocellularieae. To accommodate L. wightii and its close ally Reimnitzia, Lücking and colleagues created the new genus Sanguinotrema and the tribe Sanguinotremateae in Graphidaceae subfamily Graphidoideae. A larger, multilocus analysis by Eimy Rivas Plata and colleagues (2013) expanded taxon sampling across Graphidaceae and recovered a distinct "Leptotrema clade", comprising Leptotrema and Reimnitzia, as the sister group to tribe Ocellularieae sensu stricto rather than nested within it. The two genera share broadly similar thallus, ascus and ascospore characters, yet differ in the form of their fruit bodies—myriotremoid in Leptotrema versus chroodiscoid in Reimnitzia.

== Description ==
The thallus in Leptotrema is only weakly adnate (attached) to its bark or leaf substrate and frequently swells into gall-like cushions. Its surface appears conspicuously warted because the cortex is shot through with upright columns of calcium oxalate crystals; further inside, the medulla usually contains distinct pockets of blood-red crystals that sometimes show through as tiny crimson flecks on a pale background. Leptotrema has a myriotremoid form: its apothecia (fruiting bodies) are immersed into the substrate and open with a narrow, entire pore. The asci produce comparatively minute, muriform ascospores—each spore is divided by both transverse and longitudinal septa—that start out colourless but already possess markedly thick walls and septa while still immature, darkening to brown as they age.

== Species ==
As of June 2025, Species Fungorum (in the Catalogue of Life) accepts 15 species of Leptotrema:

- Leptotrema aemulans (Kremp.) Müll.Arg. (1894)
- Leptotrema aemulum Müll.Arg. (1895)
- Leptotrema albocoronatum C.Knight ex Shirley (1889)
- Leptotrema argillaceum Szatala (1955)
- Leptotrema endoxanthellum Zahlbr. (1936)
- Leptotrema laevium (Vain.) Zahlbr. (1923)
- Leptotrema lepadodes (Tuck.) Zahlbr. (1912)
- Leptotrema lithophila Oxner (1960)
- Leptotrema melanosporum (C.Knight) Zahlbr. (1923)
- Leptotrema microglaenoides (Vain.) Zahlbr. (1923)
- Leptotrema neozelandicum C.W.Dodge (1970)
- Leptotrema nitidulum Müll.Arg. (1895)
- Leptotrema patulum (Nyl.) Müll.Arg. (1895)
- Leptotrema polycarpum Müll.Arg. (1895)
- Leptotrema polyporum Riddle (1923)
