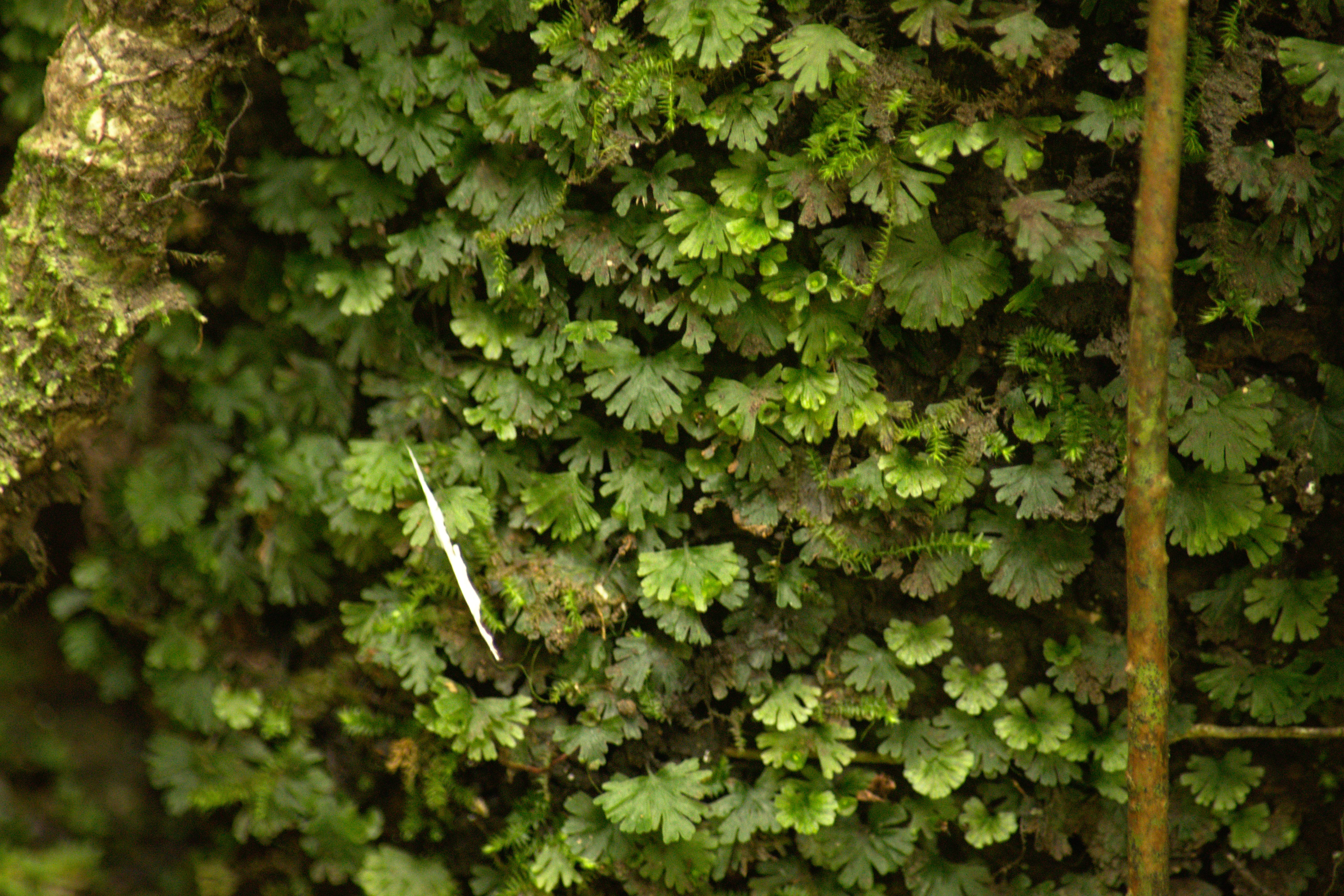

Scientific classification
- Kingdom: Plantae
- Clade: Embryophytes
- Clade: Tracheophytes
- Division: Polypodiophyta
- Class: Polypodiopsida
- Order: Hymenophyllales
- Family: Hymenophyllaceae
- Genus: Crepidomanes
- Species: C. minutum

Binomial name
- Crepidomanes minutum (Blume) K. Iwats.

Synonyms
- Gonocormus australis Ching; Gonocormus bonincola (Nakai) Tagawa; Gonocormus diffusus (Blume) Bosch; Gonocormus matthewii (Christ) Ching; Gonocormus minutus (Blume) Bosch; Gonocormus prolifer (Blume) Prantl; Gonocormus saxifragoides (C. Presl) Bosch; Gonocormus siamensis Tagawa & K. Iwats.; Gonocormus teysmannii (Bosch) Bosch; Trichomanes bonincola Nakai; Trichomanes diffusum Blume; Trichomanes matthewii Christ; Trichomanes minutum Blume; Trichomanes palmatum C. Presl; Trichomanes proliferum Blume ex Hook.; Trichomanes proliferum Blume; Trichomanes saxifragoides C. Presl; Trichomanes subpinnatifidum Bosch; Trichomanes subtrifidum Mett. ex Christ; Trichomanes teysmannii Bosch

= Crepidomanes minutum =

Species of fern

Crepidomanes minutum is a small fern in the filmy fern family which grows throughout the Pacific. It is commonly referred to as tiny bristle fern. The specific epithet 'minutum' means small in Latin, referring to the small fronds

== Description ==
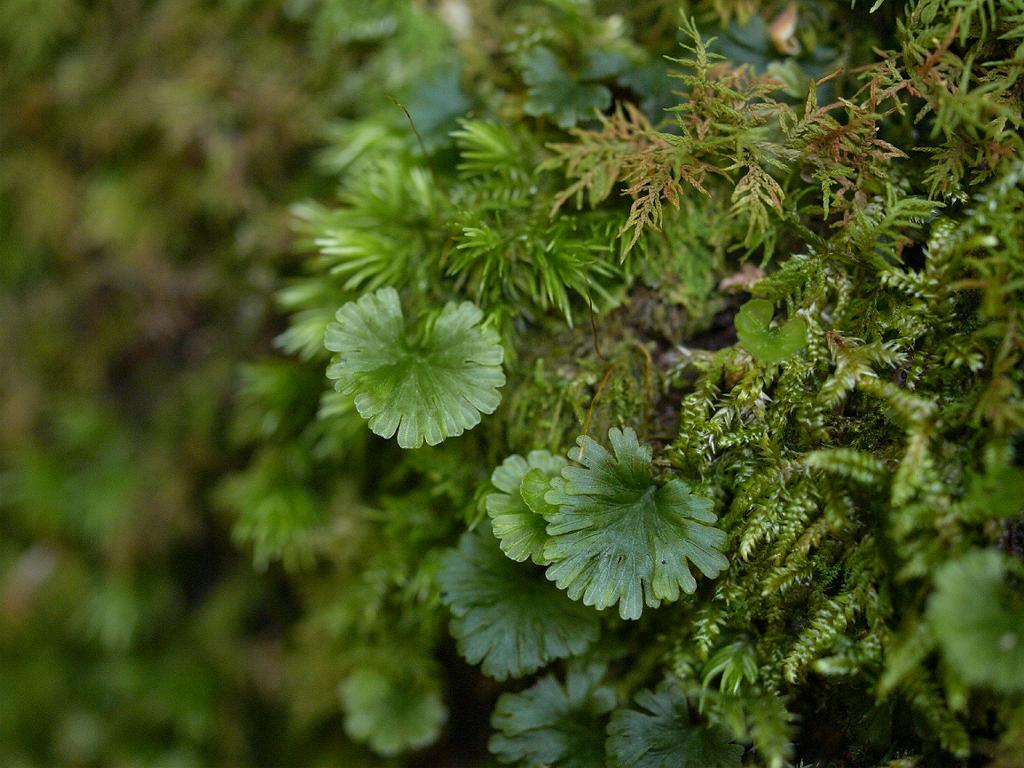
C. minutum growing in Japan

Crepidomanes minutum is a small fern which grows epipetrically or epiphytically. It tends to grow in moist, low elevation forests where moisture is abundant and can tolerate deep shade. It has long-creeping rhizomes from which its leaves arise. The rhizome does not have roots but instead has rhizoids. Its leaves range from 1.5 to 6 centimeters (0.59 to 2.4 in), and are flabellate to 1–4 times pinnate but may also be palmately lobed in some individuals. Leaves also have buds which allow individual leaves to proliferate and branch. It looks much like a moss and may be confused as one without careful examination.

The sori are located in involucres at the tips of the lobes of the leaves and are somewhat cup-shaped. It can also reproduce apogamously like many other ferns.

== Taxonomy ==
The species was first described as Trichomanes minutum by Carl Ludwig Blume in 1828 but has since been moved to Crepidomanes minutum based on genetic evidence. C. minutum has great variation in morphology between different populations, thus has extensive synonymy as many of these populations were described as separate species. Further research, however, has revealed that the variation within the species is continuous and all variation is best regarded as intraspecific rather than interspecific variation.

Crepidomanes minutum may be diploid, triploid, or tetraploid. It has a very complex evolutionary history consisting of multiple sub-lineages which have been observed to interbreed. The relationships of individual populations of C. minutum are best described by reticulate evolution.

== Range ==
Crepidomanes minutum has a broad distribution throughout the Pacific in areas including but not limited to Australia, Bhutan, Cambodia, China, Equatorial Guinea, Hawaii, India, Indonesia, Japan, Java, Korea, Malaysia, Melanesia, Micronesia, Nepal, Philippines, Polynesia, Russia, Sri Lanka, Taiwan, Thailand, and Vietnam.
