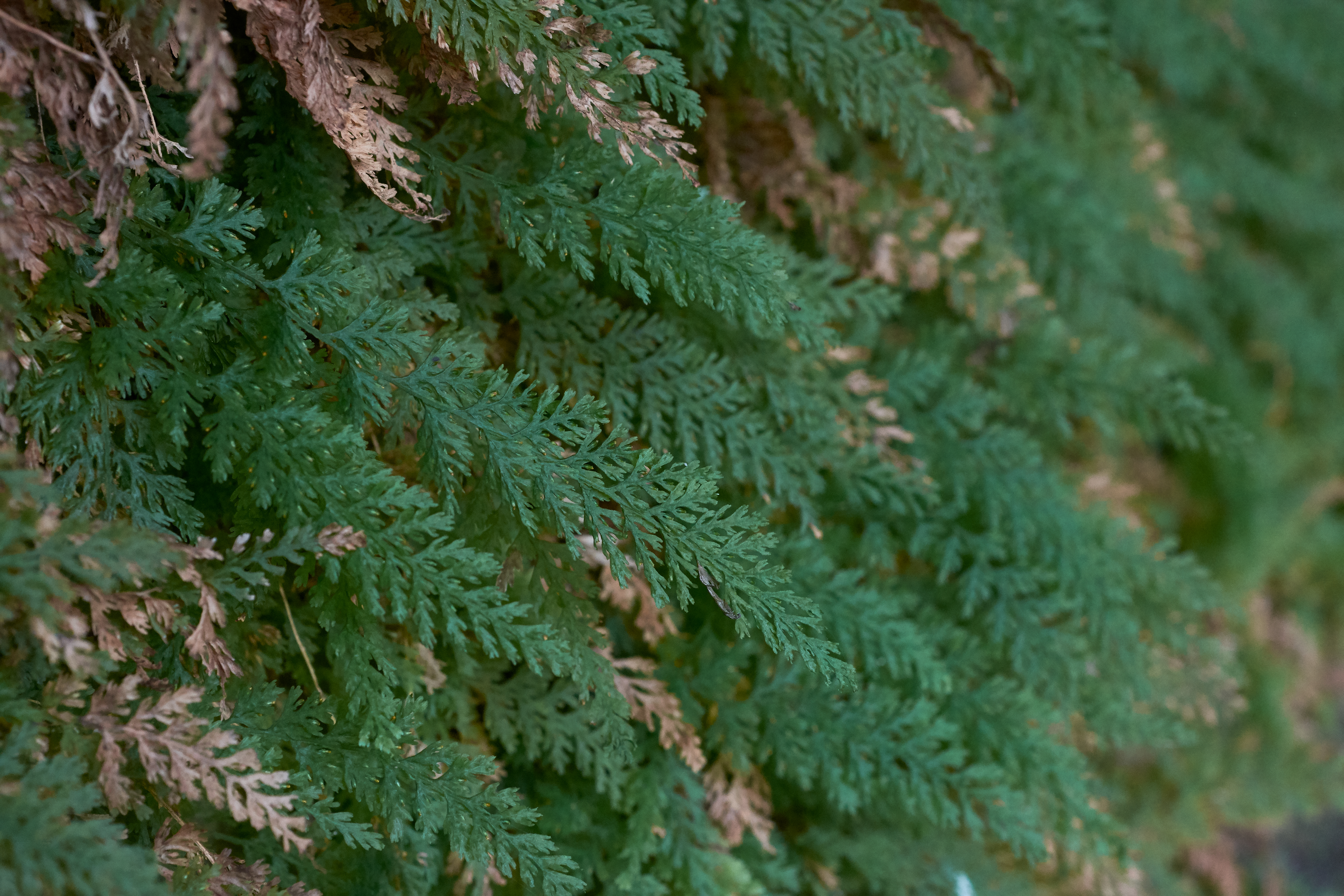

Conservation status
- Apparently Secure (NatureServe)

Scientific classification
- Kingdom: Plantae
- Clade: Tracheophytes
- Division: Polypodiophyta
- Class: Polypodiopsida
- Order: Hymenophyllales
- Family: Hymenophyllaceae
- Genus: Vandenboschia
- Species: V. boschiana

Binomial name
- Vandenboschia boschiana (J.W.Sturm ex Bosch) Ebihara & K.Iwats.

Synonyms
- Trichomanes boschianum J.W.Sturm

= Vandenboschia boschiana =

Appalachian bristle fern

Species of fern

Vandenboschia boschiana, synonym Trichomanes boschianum, also known as the Appalachian bristle fern or Appalachian filmy fern, is a small delicate perennial leptosporangiate fern which forms colonies with long, black creeping rhizomes.

== Description ==
The evergreen fronds are bipinnatifid, deeply and irregularly dissected, about 4 to 20 cm long, 1 to 4 cm across with winged stipes 1 to 7 cm long and light green in colour. The common name derives from the leaves which are very thin, only a single cell thick, missing an epidermis and translucent, giving the appearance of a wet film.

Sori, the spore-producing organs are formed along the margins of the frond segments. The indusium forms a funnel around the sorus which is sunken in the leaf tissue. A bristle-like receptacle protrudes from the indusium as in all Trichomanes species. Spore production occurs between July and September.

In common with all ferns, V. boschiana exhibits a gametophyte stage in its life cycle (alternation of generations) and develops a haploid reproductive prothallus as an independent plant. In contrast to the typical heart-shaped fern prothallus, V. boschiana gametophytes are filamentous and resemble colonies of green algae or moss protonemata.

== Taxonomy ==
According to the Flora of North America ploidy is rather variable. The western colonies tend to be diploid whilst the eastern ones are mostly tetraploid. Sterile triploids have also been recorded.

It has been hypothesized that most of the populations of V. boschiana are genetically identical clones of great age.

== Distribution ==
It is endemic to eastern North America. Populations are found in the eastern United States from southern Ohio in the north to Alabama in the south and from Arkansas and southern Illinois in the west to South Carolina in the east. In all areas the populations are very scattered and reflect the distribution of an uncommon habitat.

== Ecology and conservation ==
Vandenboschia boschiana is found in deep shade on damp acid rocks, usually sandstone, of sheltered canyons, grottos and rock shelters at an altitude of 150 to 800 m. The rock outcrops are generally found within mesic upland forests.

This fern is dependent upon a constantly high air humidity which places severe restrictions on its distribution in the current climate of eastern North America. In fact V. boschiana is believed to be a relict of milder pre-glacial conditions. The current distribution of V. boschiana is considered to reflect historical lack of glaciation, substrate, type of bedrock, lack of disturbance in the surrounding forest and micro-climate. Temperature is perhaps less important than these factors though extreme cold weather can apparently cause mortality. Periodic droughts do cause heavy mortality and have reduced many population sizes over the last few decades.

The species is probably more at risk than its G4 grading would suggest and state NatureServe conservation rankings are Vulnerable (S3) to Critically imperiled (S1).

Hazards include drying of the habitat, removal of forest canopy shading the rock exposures and over-collecting.

== Cultivation and uses ==
The plant is not known to be widely cultivated. From its large-scale distribution the plant may be hardy to USDA Zone 6, although this may not reflect the micro-climate of its sheltered habitat.
