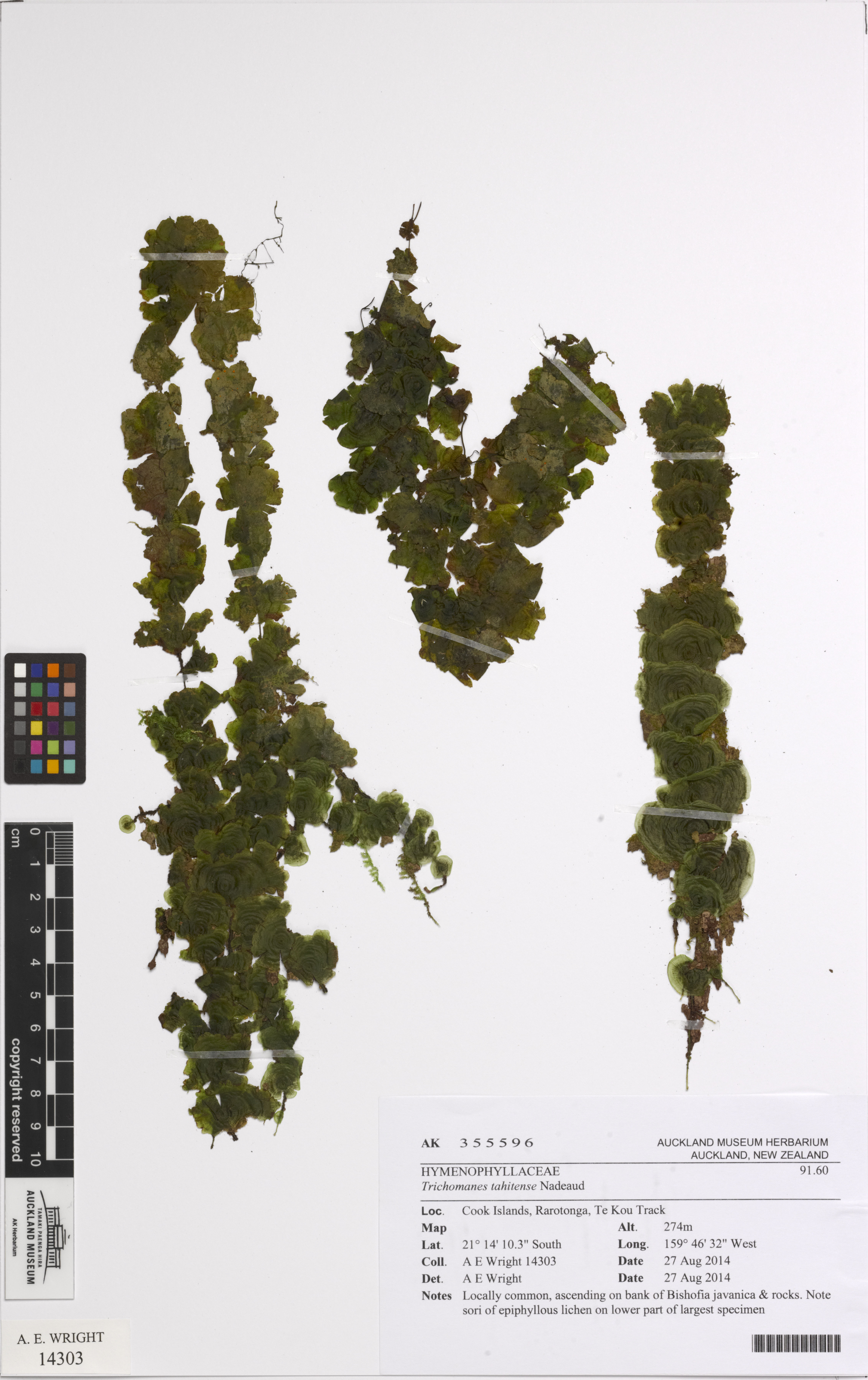
- Didymoglossum tahitense

Scientific classification
- Kingdom: Plantae
- Clade: Tracheophytes
- Division: Polypodiophyta
- Class: Polypodiopsida
- Order: Hymenophyllales
- Family: Hymenophyllaceae
- Genus: Didymoglossum
- Species: D. tahitense

Binomial name
- Didymoglossum tahitense (Nadeaud) Ebihara & K.Iwats.

Synonyms
- Microgonium tahitens

= Didymoglossum tahitense =

Species of fern

Didymoglossum tahitense, syn. Microglossum tahitense is a fern native to Polynesia, the East Indies, Fiji, and Queensland in Australia. It is in the family Hymenophyllaceae, and is unusual in having peltate leaves. These are sessile on the rhizome.
