= Hymenophyllum contractile =

Conservation status
- Critically Endangered (IUCN 3.1)

Scientific classification
- Kingdom: Plantae
- Clade: Tracheophytes
- Division: Polypodiophyta
- Class: Polypodiopsida
- Order: Hymenophyllales
- Family: Hymenophyllaceae
- Genus: Hymenophyllum
- Species: H. contractile

Binomial name
- Hymenophyllum contractile Sodiro

Species of fern

Hymenophyllum contractile is a species of fern in the family Hymenophyllaceae. It is endemic to Ecuador. Its natural habitats are subtropical or tropical moist lowland forests and subtropical or tropical moist montane forests. It is threatened by habitat loss.
