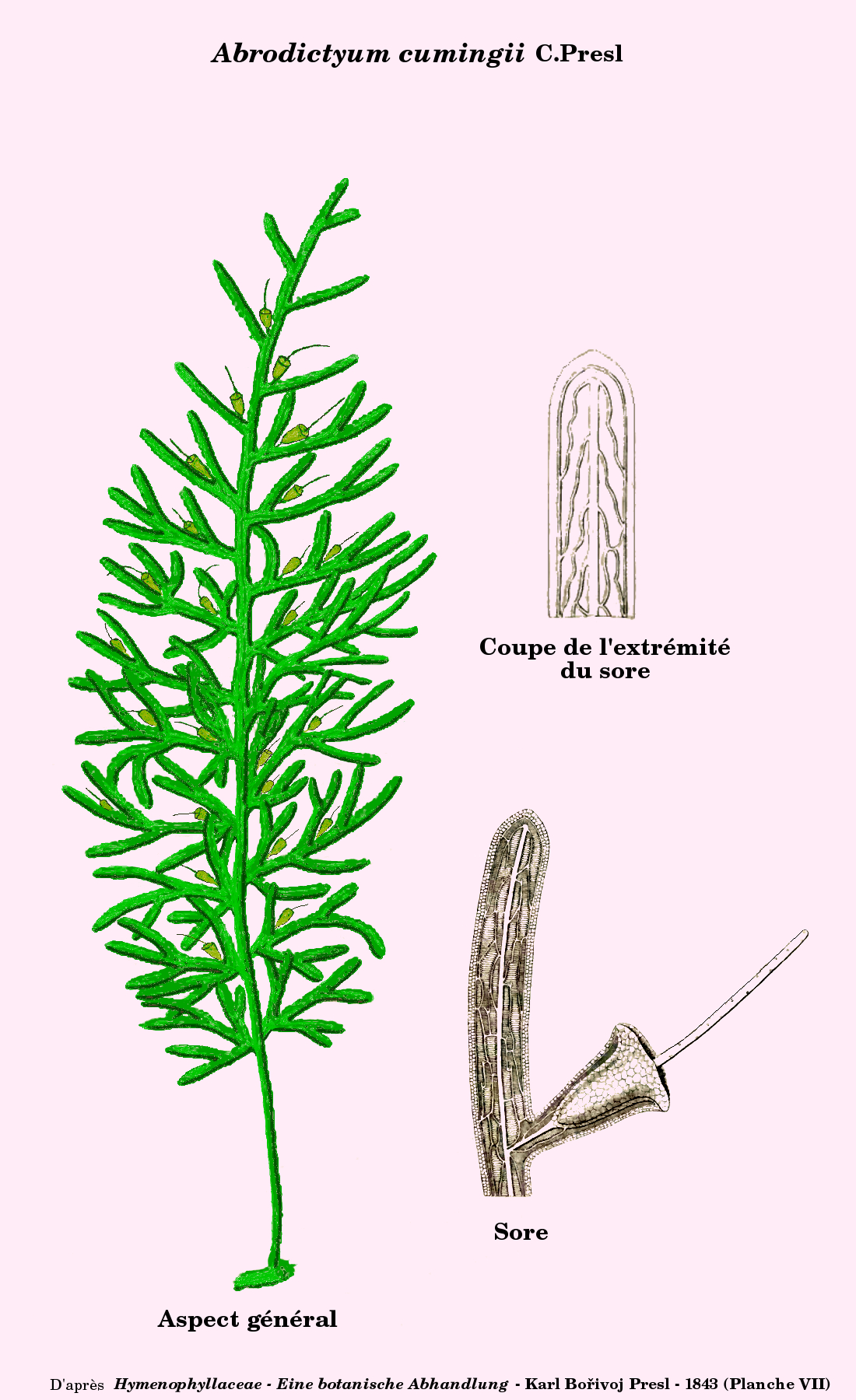
- Illustration of Abrodictyum cumingii

Scientific classification
- Kingdom: Plantae
- Clade: Tracheophytes
- Division: Polypodiophyta
- Class: Polypodiopsida
- Order: Hymenophyllales
- Family: Hymenophyllaceae
- Subfamily: Trichomanoideae
- Genus: Abrodictyum; C.Presl

Type species
- Abrodictyum cumingii Presl 1843

Species
- See text

Synonyms
- Habrodictyon corrig. Presl ex van den Bosch; Macroglena (Presl 1848) Copeland; Selenodesmium (Prantl 1875) Copeland

= Abrodictyum =

Genus of ferns

Abrodictyum is a fern genus in the family Hymenophyllaceae. The genus is accepted in the Pteridophyte Phylogeny Group classification of 2016 (PPG I) but not by some other sources, which sink it into a broadly defined Trichomanes.

== Taxonomy ==
The genus Abrodictyum was erected by Carl Presl in 1843. Its status, like other genera in the family Hymenophyllaceae, remains disputed. The Pteridophyte Phylogeny Group classification of 2016 (PPG I) accepts the genus, placing it in the subfamily Trichomanoideae, and saying that there are about 25 species.

As of October 2026, the Checklist of Ferns and Lycophytes of the World and World Flora Online recognize 33 species in Abrodictyum. Plants of the World Online sinks the genus into a broadly circumscribed Trichomanes.

=== Phylogeny ===
- Abrodictyum
  - (Abrodictyum)
    - - A. asae-grayi (Bosch) Ebihara & K.Iwats.
      - A. strictum (Menzies ex Hook. & Grev.) Ebihara & K.Iwats.
    - - A. brassii (Croxall) Ebihara & K.Iwats.
      - - A. schlechteri (Brause) Ebihara & K.Iwats.
        - - A. boninense Tagawa & K.Iwats. ex K.Iwats.
          - - A. caudatum (Brack.) Ebihara & K.Iwats. (Bristle fern)
            - A. flavofuscum (Bosch) Ebihara & K.Iwats.
  - (Pachychaetum)
    - A. tamarisciforme (Jacq.) Ebihara & Dubuisson
    - - - A. rigidum (Sw.) Ebihara & Dubuisson
        - - A. elongatum (A.Cunn.) Ebihara & K.Iwats.
          - - A. dentatum (Bosch) Ebihara & K.Iwats.
            - A. laetum (Bosch) Ebihara & K.Iwats.
      - - A. pachyphlebium (C.Chr.) Bauret & Dubuisson
        - - A. inexpectatum Dubuisson & Rouhan
          - - A. dregei (van den Bosch) Dubuisson & Rouhan
            - - A. angustimarginatum (Bonap.) J.P.Roux
              - - A. cylindratum Dubuisson
                - A. parviflorum (Poiret) Bauret & Dubuisson

Other species:

- Abrodictyum caespifrons (C.Chr.) comb. ined. (synonymized in POWO with A. dentatum var. pumilum, as T. pumilum)
- Abrodictyum clathratum (Tagawa) Ebihara & K.Iwats.
- Abrodictyum cumingii C. Presl
- Abrodictyum franceae Dubuisson et al.
- Abrodictyum idoneum (C.V.Morton) Ebihara & K.Iwats.
- Abrodictyum kalimantanense (K.Iwats. & M.Kato) Ebihara & K.Iwats.
- Abrodictyum obscurum (Blume) Ebihara & K.Iwats. (recognized in POWO as T. obscurum and T. siamense)
- Abrodictyum pluma (Hook.) Ebihara & K.Iwats.
- Abrodictyum polynesicum Dubuisson & Ebihara (not in POWO)
- Abrodictyum polystromaticum (Bierh.) Ebihara & Dubuisson
- Abrodictyum setaceum (Bosch) Ebihara & K.Iwats. (included in A. obscurum, as T. obscurum, in POWO)
- Abrodictyum sprucei (Baker) Ebihara & Dubuisson
- Abrodictyum trichophyllum (T.Moore) Dubuisson, Rouhan & Ebihara
- Abrodictyum truncatum (Copel.) comb. ined.
- Abrodictyum windischianum (Lellinger) comb. ined.
