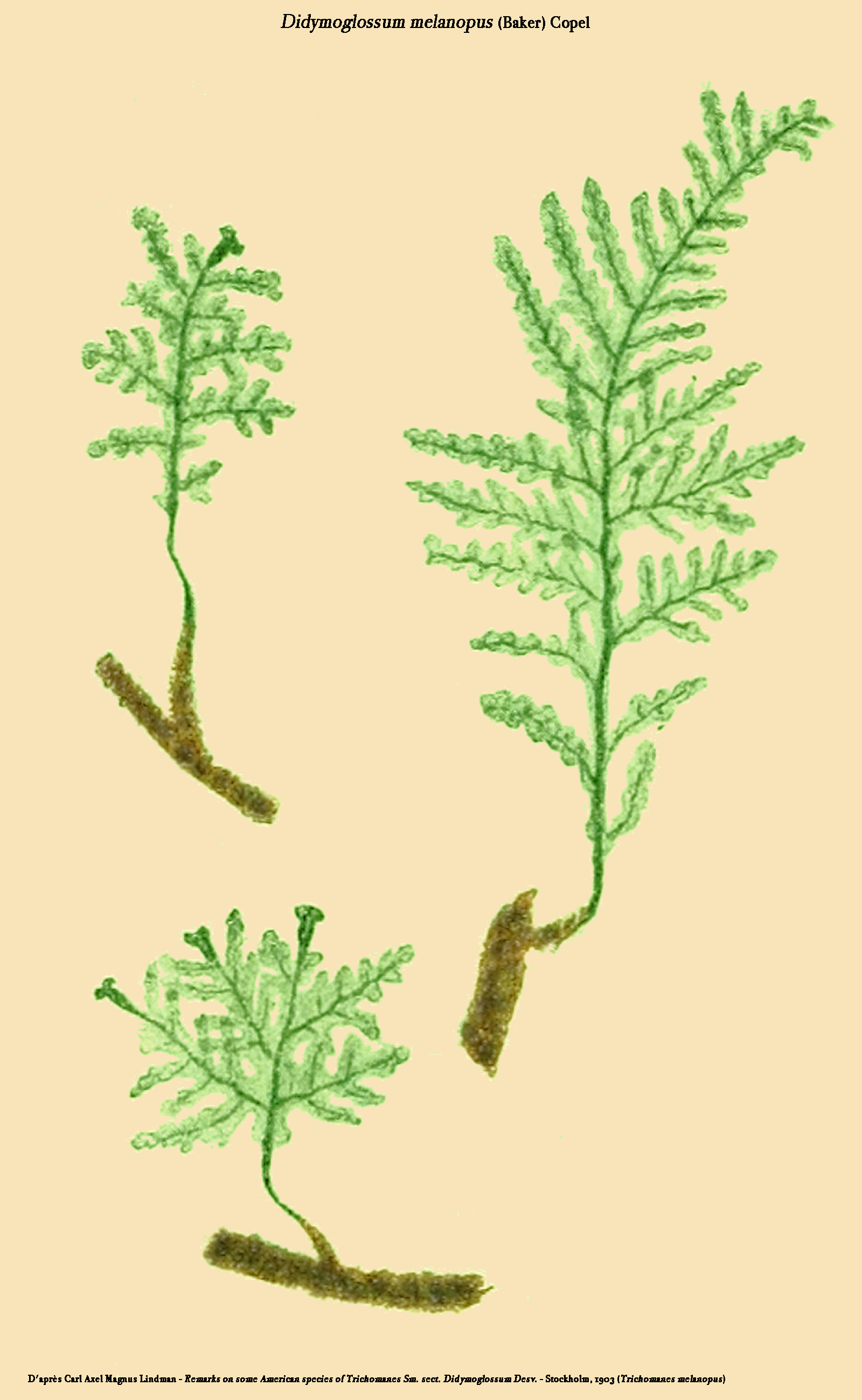
- Illustration (original as Trichomanes melanopus)

Scientific classification
- Kingdom: Plantae
- Clade: Tracheophytes
- Division: Polypodiophyta
- Class: Polypodiopsida
- Order: Hymenophyllales
- Family: Hymenophyllaceae
- Genus: Didymoglossum
- Species: D. melanopus

Binomial name
- Didymoglossum melanopus (Baker) Copel.

Synonyms
- Trichomanes kraussii var. crispatum Hook.; Trichomanes melanopus Baker

= Didymoglossum melanopus =

Species of fern

Didymoglossum melanopus is a species of fern in the family Hymenophyllaceae. It is endemic to Ecuador.

The genus Didymoglossum is accepted in the Pteridophyte Phylogeny Group classification of 2016 (PPG I), but not by some other sources. As of October 2019, Plants of the World Online merged the genus into a broadly defined Trichomanes, treating this species as Trichomanes melanopus.
