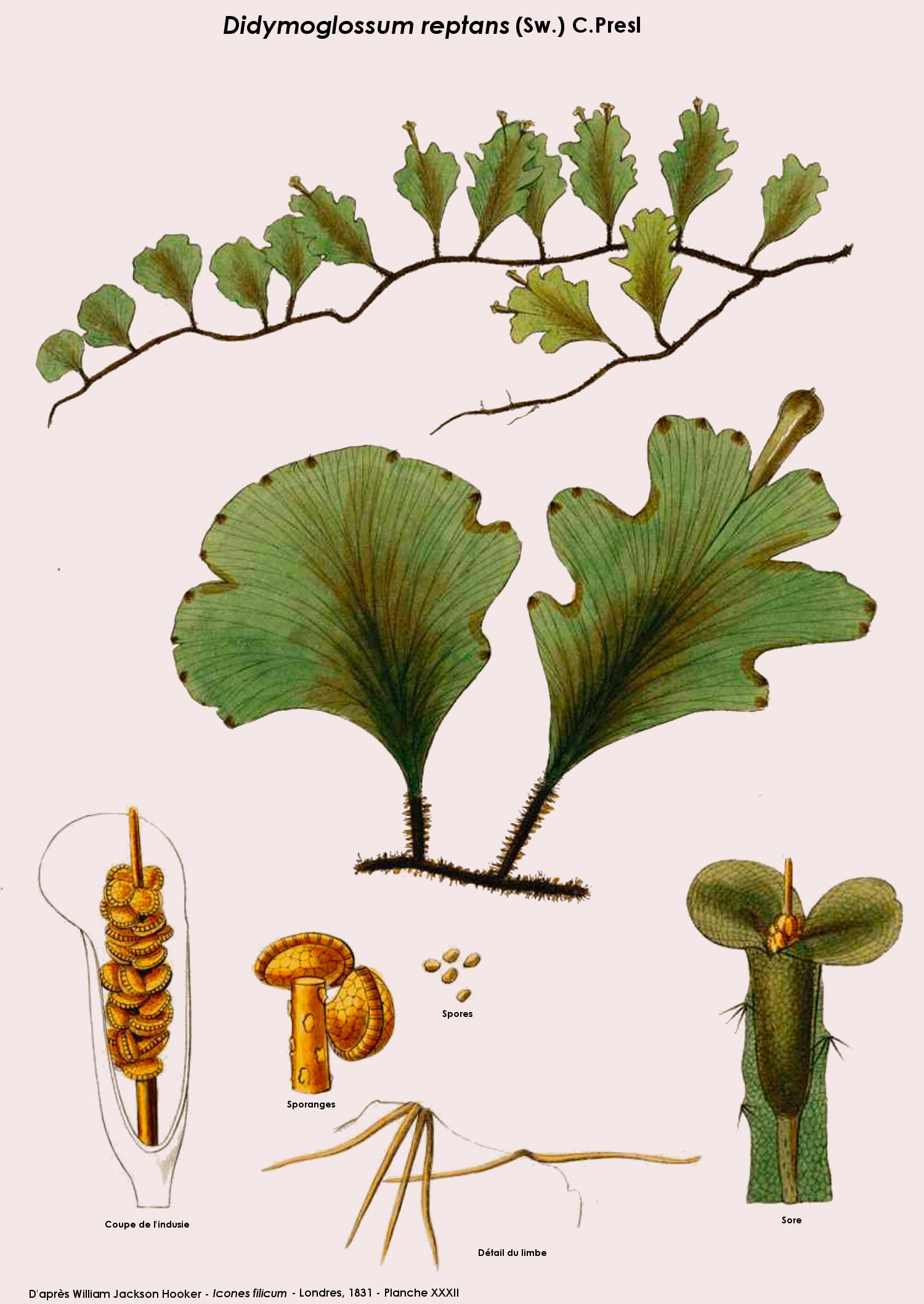
- Didymoglossum reptans

Scientific classification
- Kingdom: Plantae
- Clade: Tracheophytes
- Division: Polypodiophyta
- Class: Polypodiopsida
- Order: Hymenophyllales
- Family: Hymenophyllaceae
- Subfamily: Trichomanoideae
- Genus: Didymoglossum; Desv.

Type species
- Didymoglossum muscoides (Dw.) Desvaux 1827

Subgenera
- Subg. Didymoglossum; Subg. Microgonium

Synonyms
- Hemiphlebium Presl 1843; Lecanium Presl 1843 non Reinwardt 1825; Lecanolepis Pichi-Sermolli 1973; Microgonium Presl 1843

= Didymoglossum =

Genus of ferns

Didymoglossum is a tropical genus of ferns in the family Hymenophyllaceae. It comprises more than 30 epilithic or low-epiphytic species under two subgenera. The genus is accepted in the Pteridophyte Phylogeny Group classification of 2016 (PPG I), but not by some other sources which sink it into a broadly defined Trichomanes.

== Taxonomy ==
The genus Didymoglossum was first described by Nicaise Auguste Desvaux in 1827. Its status, like other genera in the subfamily Trichomanoideae, remains disputed. The Pteridophyte Phylogeny Group classification of 2016 (PPG I) accepts the genus, placing it in the subfamily Hymenophylloideae and saying that there are about 30 species. As of October 2019, the Checklist of Ferns and Lycophytes of the World listed 55 species, whereas Plants of the World Online sank the genus into Trichomanes.

Phylogeny of Didymoglossum

- - (Microgonium)
    - D. bimarginatum
    - - - - D. cuspidatum
          - D. fulgens
        - - - D. kirkii
            - D. lenormandii
          - - D. mindorense
            - D. rotundifolium
      - - D. chamaedrys
        - - D. erosum
          - - - D. sublimbatum
              - - D. ballardianum
                - D. benlii
            - - D. ekmanii
              - - D. godmanii
                - D. kapplerianum
  - (Didymoglossum)
    - - section Lecanium
        D. membranaceum
    - - D. barklyanum
      - - section Pinnata
          - - D. hymenoides
            - - D. kraussii
              - D. reptans
          - - - D. hildebrandtii
              - - D. beaverianum
                - D. liberiense
            - - D. tahitense
              - - D. beccarianum
                - D. motleyi
        - section Flabellata
          - D. petersii
          - - - D. gourlianum
              - - D. nummularium
                - D. punctatum
            - - - D. exiguum
                - D. lorencei
              - - D. pinnatinervium
                - - D. angustifrons
                  - D. ovale

=== Subgenus Didymoglossum ===
Subgenus Didymoglossum Ebihara & K.Iwats. is mainly neotropical, with about 20 species, which include:

- Didymoglossum angustifrons Fée 1866
  (=) Trichomanes angustifrons (Fée) Wess. Boer
- Didymoglossum cordifolium Fée
  (=) Trichomanes cordifolium (Fée) Alston
- Didymoglossum curtii (Rosenst.) Pic.Serm.
  (=) Trichomanes curtii Rosenst.
- Didymoglossum exiguum (Bedd.) Copel.
  (=) Trichomanes exiguum (Bedd.) Baker
  (=) Hymenophyllum exiguum Bedd.
- Didymoglossum gourlianum (Grev. ex J.Sm.) Pic.Serm.
  (=) Trichomanes gourlianum Grev. ex J.Sm.
- Didymoglossum hildebrandtii (Kuhn) Ebihara & Dubuisson
  (=) Trichomanes hildebrandtii Kuhn
- Didymoglossum hymenoides (Hedw.) Copel.
  (=) Hemiphlebium hymenoides (Hedw.) Prantl
  (=) Trichomanes hymenoides Hedw.
- Didymoglossum krausii (Hook.& Grev.) C.Presl
  (=) Hemiphlebium krausii (Hook.& Grev.) Prantl
  (=) Trichomanes krausii Hook.& Grev.
- Didymoglossum liberiense (Copel.) Copel.
  (=) Trichomanes liberiense Copel.
- Didymoglossum lineolatum Bosch
  (=) Trichomanes lineolatum (Bosch) Hook.
- Didymoglossum lorencei (Tardieu) Ebihara & Dubuisson
  (=) Trichomanes lorencei Tardieu
- Didymoglossum melanopus (Baker) Copel.
  (=) Trichomanes melanopus Baker
- Didymoglossum membranaceum (L.) Vareschi
  (=) Lecanolepis membranacea (L.) Pic.Serm.
  (=) Hemiphlebium membranaceum (L.) Prantl
  (=) Lecanium membranaceum (L.) C.Presl
  (=) Trichomanes membranaceum L.
- Didymoglossum motleyi (Bosch) Ebihara & K.Iwats.
  (=) Trichomanes motleyi Bosch
- Didymoglossum nummularium Bosch
  (=) Trichomanes nummularium (Bosch) C.Chr.
- Didymoglossum ovale E.Fourn.
  (=) Trichomanes ovale (E.Fourn.) Wess. Boer
- Didymoglossum petersii (A.Gray) Copel.
  (=) Hemiphlebium petersii (A.Gray) Prantl
  (=) Microgonium petersii (A.Gray) Bosch
  (=) Trichomanes petersii A.Gray
- Didymoglossum pinnatinervium (Jenman) Pic.Serm.
  (=) Trichomanes pinnatinervium Jenman
- Didymoglossum punctatum (Poir.) Desv.
  (=) Didymoglossum punctatum (Poir.) C. Presl (hom. illeg. superfl.)
  (=) Hemiphlebium punctatum (Poir.) Bosch
  (=) Trichomanes punctatum Poir.
- Didymoglossum pusillum (Sw.) Desv.
- Didymoglossum reptans (Sw.) C.Presl
- Didymoglossum rhipidophyllum (Sloss.) Pic.Serm.
- Didymoglossum sublimbatum (Müll.Berol.) Ebihara & K.Iwats.
  (=) Trichomanes sublimbatum Müll.Berol.
- Didymoglossum tahitense (Nadeaud) Ebihara & K.Iwats.
  (=) Trichomanes tahitense Nadeaud

=== Subgenus Microgonium ===
Subgenus Microgonium (C.Presl) Ebihara & K.Iwats. is mainly paleotropical with more than 10 species, which include:

- Didymoglossum cuspidatum (Willd.) Ebihara & Dubuisson
  (=) Trichomanes cuspidatum Willd.
- Didymoglossum bimarginatum (Bosch) Ebihara & K. Iwats.
  (=) Microgonium bimarginatum Bosch
- Didymoglossum ekmanii (Wess. Boer) Ebihara & Dubuisson
  (=) Trichomanes ekmanii Wess.Boer
- Didymoglossum godmanii (Hook.) Ebihara & Dubuisson
  (=) Trichomanes godmanii Hook.
- Didymoglossum kapplerianum (Sturm) Ebihara & Dubuisson
  (=) Trichomanes kapplerianum Sturm in Martius
- Didymoglossum kirkii (Hook.) Ebihara & Dubuisson
  (=) Trichomanes kirkii Hook. in Hook. & Baker
- Didymoglossum lenormandii (Bosch) Ebihara & Dubuisson
  (=) Trichomanes lenormandii Bosch
- Didymoglossum mindorense (H.Christ) K. Iwats.
  (=) Trichomanes mindorense H.Christ
- Didymoglossum pygmaeum (C.Chr.) Ebihara & Dubuisson
  (=) Trichomanes pygmaeum C.Chr.
- Didymoglossum sinuatum (Bonap.) Ebihara & Dubuisson
  (=) Trichomanes sinuatum Bonap.
- Didymoglossum wesselsboeri Ebihara & Dubuisson
  (=) Trichomanes hookeri C. Presl
  (=) non Didymoglossum hookeri C. Presl
