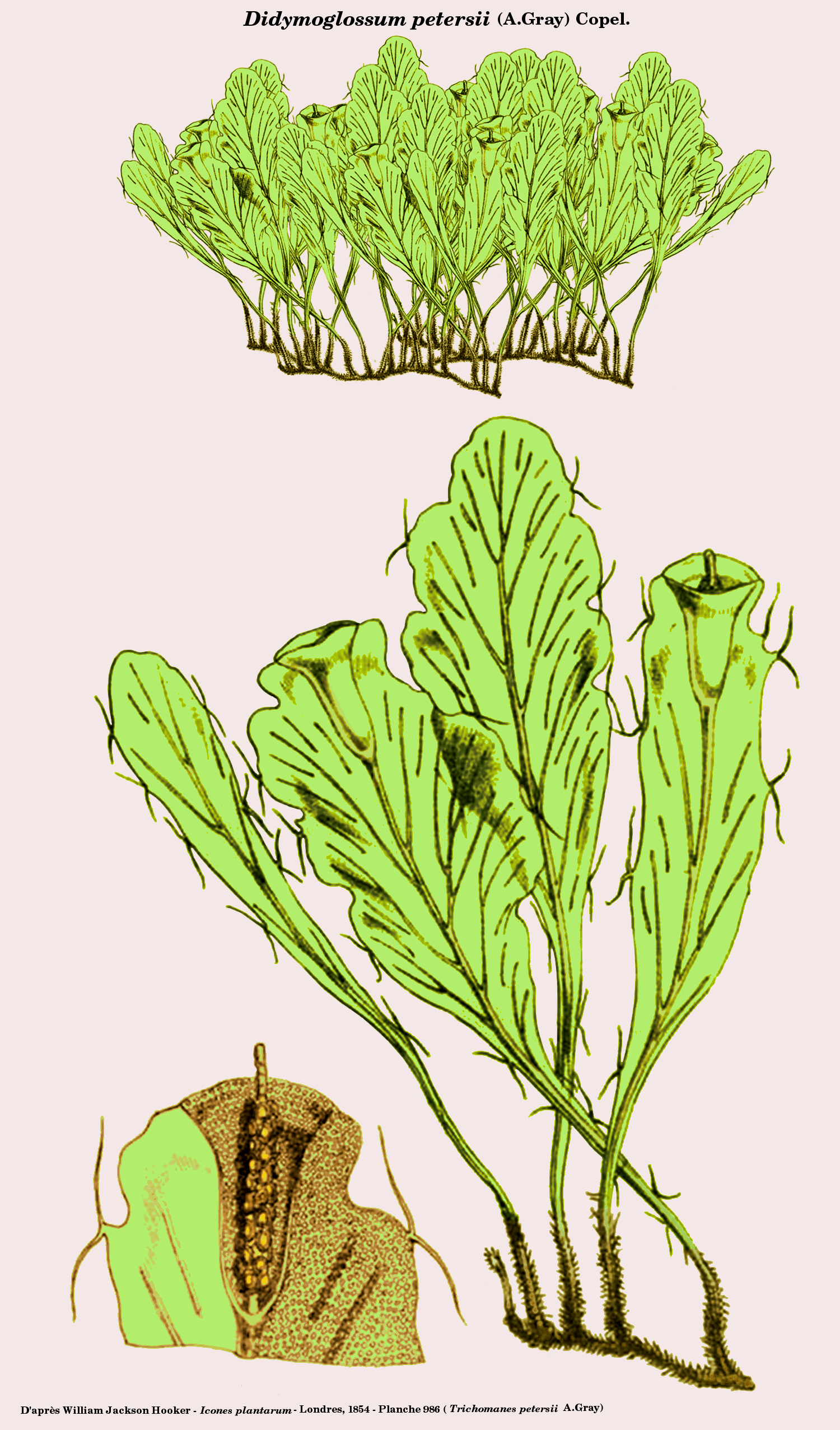
- Illustration (original as Trichomanes petersii)

Scientific classification
- Kingdom: Plantae
- Clade: Tracheophytes
- Division: Polypodiophyta
- Class: Polypodiopsida
- Order: Hymenophyllales
- Family: Hymenophyllaceae
- Genus: Didymoglossum
- Species: D. petersii

Binomial name
- Didymoglossum petersii (A.Gray) Copel.

Synonyms
- Didymoglossum reptans var. schaffneri (Schltdl.) E.Fourn.; Hemiphlebium petersii (A.Gray) Prantl; Microgonium petersii (A.Gray) Bosch; Trichomanes petersii A.Gray; Trichomanes schaffneri Schltdl.

= Didymoglossum petersii =

Species of fern

Didymoglossum petersii, the dwarf bristle fern, is a species in the family Hymenophyllaceae, (filmy ferns). It is one of three filmy ferns native to a significant area of the United States. It is found only in the nine most southeastern states, south of the Kentucky/Virginia - Tennessee/North Carolina dividing line, as well as in Mexico and Guatemala.

The genus Didymoglossum is accepted in the Pteridophyte Phylogeny Group classification of 2016 (PPG I), but not by some other sources. As of October 2019, Plants of the World Online merged the genus into a broadly defined Trichomanes, treating this species as Trichomanes petersii.
