= Sanguinotrema =

Scientific classification
- Domain: Eukaryota
- Kingdom: Fungi
- Division: Ascomycota
- Class: Lecanoromycetes
- Order: Graphidales
- Family: Graphidaceae
- Genus: Sanguinotrema; Lücking (2015)
- Species: S. wightii

Binomial name
- Sanguinotrema wightii (Taylor) Lücking (2015)

Synonyms
- Endocarpon wightii Taylor (1847); Endocarpon baileyi Stirt. (1881); Leptotrema wightii (Taylor) Müll.Arg. (1882); Leptotrema baileyi (Stirt.) Shirley (1889); Thelotrema wightii (Taylor) Nyl. (1858); Phaeotrema wightii (Taylor) Zahlbr. (1944); Myriotrema wightii (Taylor) Hale (1980)

Single-species lichen genus

Sanguinotrema is a single-species fungal genus in the family Graphidaceae, and subfamily Graphidoideae. It contains the species Sanguinotrema wightii, a mostly corticolous (bark-dwelling), crustose lichen. This species has a pantropical distribution.

== Description ==
Genus Sanguinotrema was circumscribed by lichenologist Robert Lücking in 2015. It is characterized by a fragile, hollow thallus with a black hypothallus, columnar clusters of calcium oxalate crystals, a loose cortex, and pockets of blood-red crystal clusters in the photobiont layer and medulla. Sanguinotrema wightii also features pore-like (myriotremoid) apothecia with entire margins; Leptotrema-type asci; small, muriform, brown ascospores; and a lack of secondary substances.

== Taxonomy ==
Sanguinotrema wightii was first formally described by Thomas Taylor in 1847 as Endocarpon wightii. The type specimen was collected by Scottich surgeon and taxonomist Robert Wight in Madras (now Chennai), India, and it is him for whom the species is named. The blood-red crystal clusters in the photobiont layer and medulla are unique within the family, making this species unmistakable and serving as the basis for the generic name Sanguinotrema.

Alongside the genus Sanguinotrema, a new tribe, Sanguinotremateae, was proposed within the Graphidaceae subfamily Graphidoideae. This tribe is characterized by a thick or inflated thallus with a hollow base, columnar clusters of calcium oxalate crystals, and rounded to angular or lobate ascomata. The tribe includes two genera: Sanguinotrema and Reimnitzia. Previously, the tribe was named Leptotremateae, but it has since been replaced with the name Sanguinotremateae to better reflect the characteristics of this distinct group of lichens.

== Habitat and distribution ==
Sanguinotrema wightii is a common and widespread pantropical species found on tree bark or, more rarely, over bryophytes in seasonally dry lowland forests. It is often inhabited by ants in the hollow space beneath the black hypothallus.
