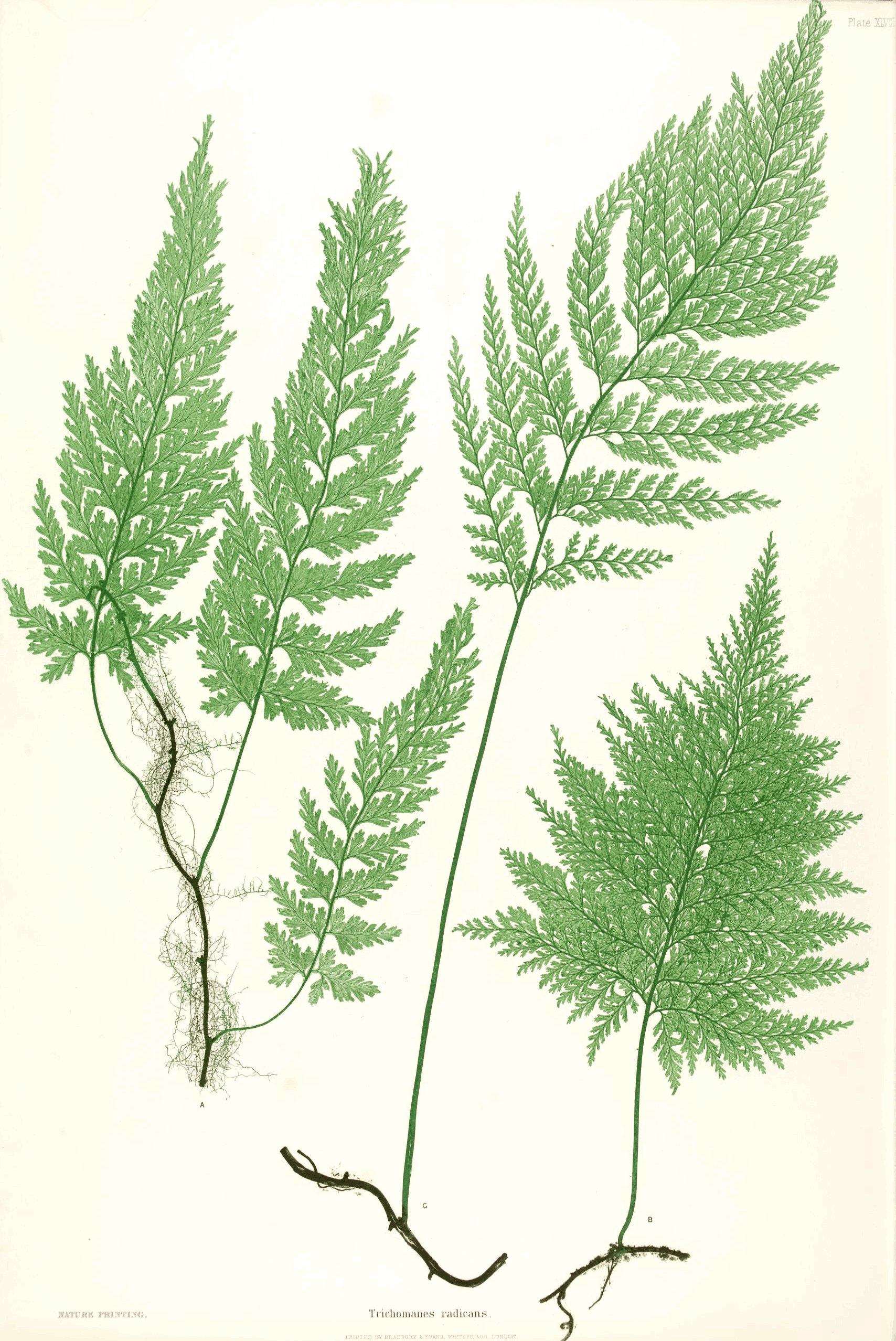

Conservation status
- Least Concern (IUCN 3.1)

Scientific classification
- Kingdom: Plantae
- Clade: Tracheophytes
- Division: Polypodiophyta
- Class: Polypodiopsida
- Order: Hymenophyllales
- Family: Hymenophyllaceae
- Genus: Vandenboschia
- Species: V. speciosa

Binomial name
- Vandenboschia speciosa (Willd.) G.Kunkel

Synonyms
- Trichomanes speciosum Willd.; Trichomanes brevisetum R.Br.; Trichomanes radicans var. andrewsii Bab.; Trichomanes radicans var. speciosum (Willd.) Hook.f.

= Vandenboschia speciosa =

Killarney fern

Species of fern

Vandenboschia speciosa, synonym Trichomanes speciosum, commonly known as the Killarney fern, is a species of fern found widely in Western Europe. It is most abundant in Ireland, Great Britain, Brittany, Galicia, Canary Islands, Madeira and the Azores, but is also found in other locations including France, Spain, Portugal and Italy. It is a relict endemic European species with a disjunct distribution, having had a much wider distribution before the climate changes of the Tertiary and Quaternary periods.

This fern has an unusual life cycle, with a perennial gametophyte phase with an active vegetative reproduction. The gametophyte has the ability to tolerate darker and drier habitats than does the sporophyte. The sporophyte form is found in only 16 locations in the UK although the gametophyte form is more widespread. Once found on Arran, it was thought to be extinct in Scotland due to the activities of Victorian collectors, but the species has been discovered on Skye in its gametophyte form. In the United Kingdom, it is classed as vulnerable and it is considered one of Europe's most threatened plants. It is found mostly near the western coasts of the United Kingdom and Ireland, and in scattered locations inland.

Killarney fern is a medium-sized, long-lived fern with delicate, highly divided, bipinnate fronds arising from a creeping rhizome. It is one of only three European species with translucent leaves and requires a humid, frost-free environment. In Britain, it is largely restricted to damp, shady, sheltered locations such as ravines, although in Ireland it occupies a wider range of habitats. In Brittany, it grows on the stonework of a number of ancient wells.

It became a protected species in the United Kingdom in 1975 under the Conservation of Wild Creatures and Wild Plants Act.
