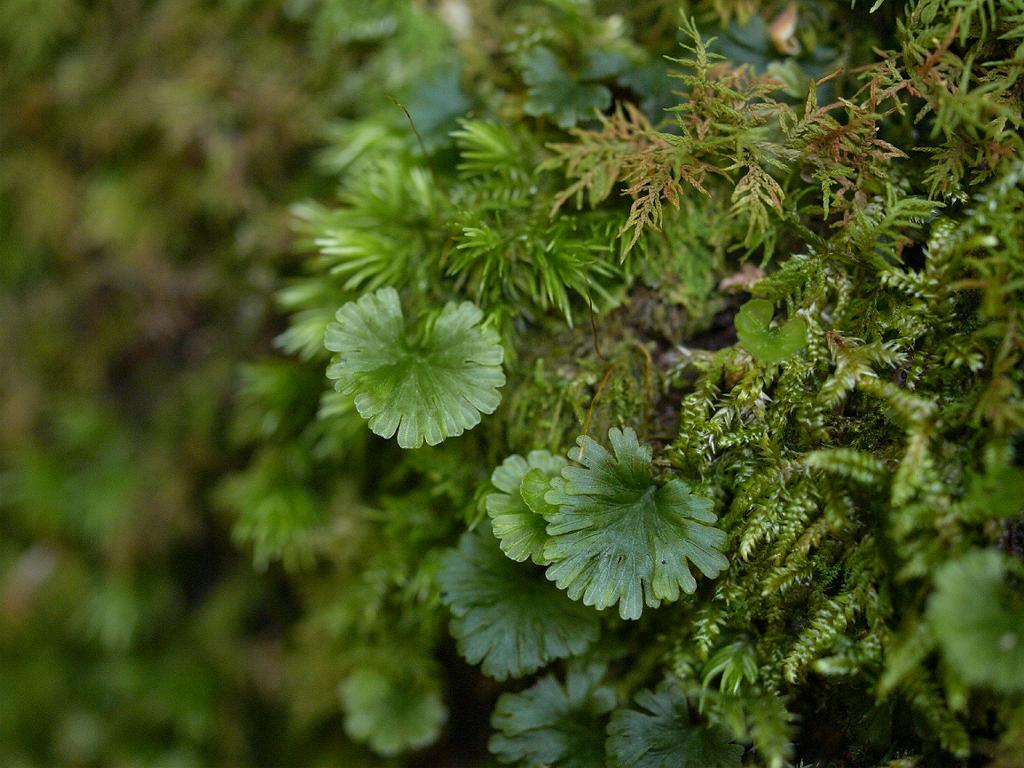
- Crepidomanes minutum

Scientific classification
- Kingdom: Plantae
- Clade: Tracheophytes
- Division: Polypodiophyta
- Class: Polypodiopsida
- Order: Hymenophyllales
- Family: Hymenophyllaceae
- Subfamily: Trichomanoideae
- Genus: Crepidomanes (C.Presl) C.Presl

Type species
- Crepidomanes intramarginale (Hooker & Greville) Presl

Species
- See text

Synonyms
- Crepidophyllum Reed 1948 non Herzog 1926; Crepidopteris Copeland 1938 non Presl 1838; Gonocormus van den Bosch 1861; Nesopteris Copeland 1938; Reediella Pichi Sermolli 1970 non Osmolska 1970; Taschneria Presl 1849-51

= Crepidomanes =

Genus of ferns

Crepidomanes is a genus of ferns in the family Hymenophyllaceae. It is mostly distributed through the Old World but has one species, Crepidomanes intricatum, in North America.

== Phylogeny ==
Phylogeny of Crepidomanes by Fern Tree of Life.

- - (Nesopteris)
    - C. aphlebioides (H. Christ) I.M. Turner
    - - C. thysanostomum (Makino) Ebihara & K. Iwats.
      - - C. grande (Copel.) Ebihara & K. Iwats.
        - C. intermedium (Bosch) Ebihara & K. Iwats.
  - (Crepidomanes)
    - - section Cladotrichoma
        - C. frappieri (Cordem.) J.P. Roux
        - C. longilabiatum (Bonaparte) J.P. Roux
    - - section Crepidium
        - C. humile (G. Forst.) Bosch.
        - - C. parvulum (Poiret 1808) Nivart, Senterre & Dubuisson
          - C. saxifragoides (Presl) Green
      - section Crepidomanes
        - - C. bipunctatum (Poir.) Copel.
          - C. christii (Copel.) Copel.
        - - C. intramarginale (Hook. & Grev.) Copel.
          - - - C. latealatum (Bosch) Copel.
              - - C. kurzii (Bedd.) Tagawa & K. Iwats.
                - C. vitiense (Baker) Bostock.
            - - - C. fallax (H. Christ) Ebihara & Dubuisson
                - - C. chevalieri (H. Christ) Ebihara & Dubuisson
                  - - C. trinerve (Copeland ex Kunkel) Dubuisson & Ebihara
                    - - C. melanotrichum (Schltdl.) J.P. Roux
                      - - C. inopinatum (Pic.Serm.) J.P. Roux
                        - C. pyxidiferum (von Linné) Dubuisson & Ebihara
              - - C. latemarginale (D.C. Eaton) Copel.
                - - - C. mettenii (C. Chr.) Ebihara & Dubuisson
                    - - C. bonapartei (Christensen) Roux
                      - - C. africanum (H. Christ) Ebihara & Dubuisson
                        - C. clarenceanum (F. Ballard) Pic.Serm
                  - - C. walleri (Watts) Tind.
                    - - C. makinoi (Christensen) Copeland
                      - - C. draytonianum (Brack.) Ebihara & K. Iwats.
                        - - C. intricatum (Farrar) Ebihara & Weakley
                          - C. schmidtianum (Zenker ex Taschner) Iwatsuki

Other species: Section Crepidomanes

- Crepidomanes barnardianum (F.M. Bailey) Tindale
- Crepidomanes rupicolum (Racib.) Copel.
