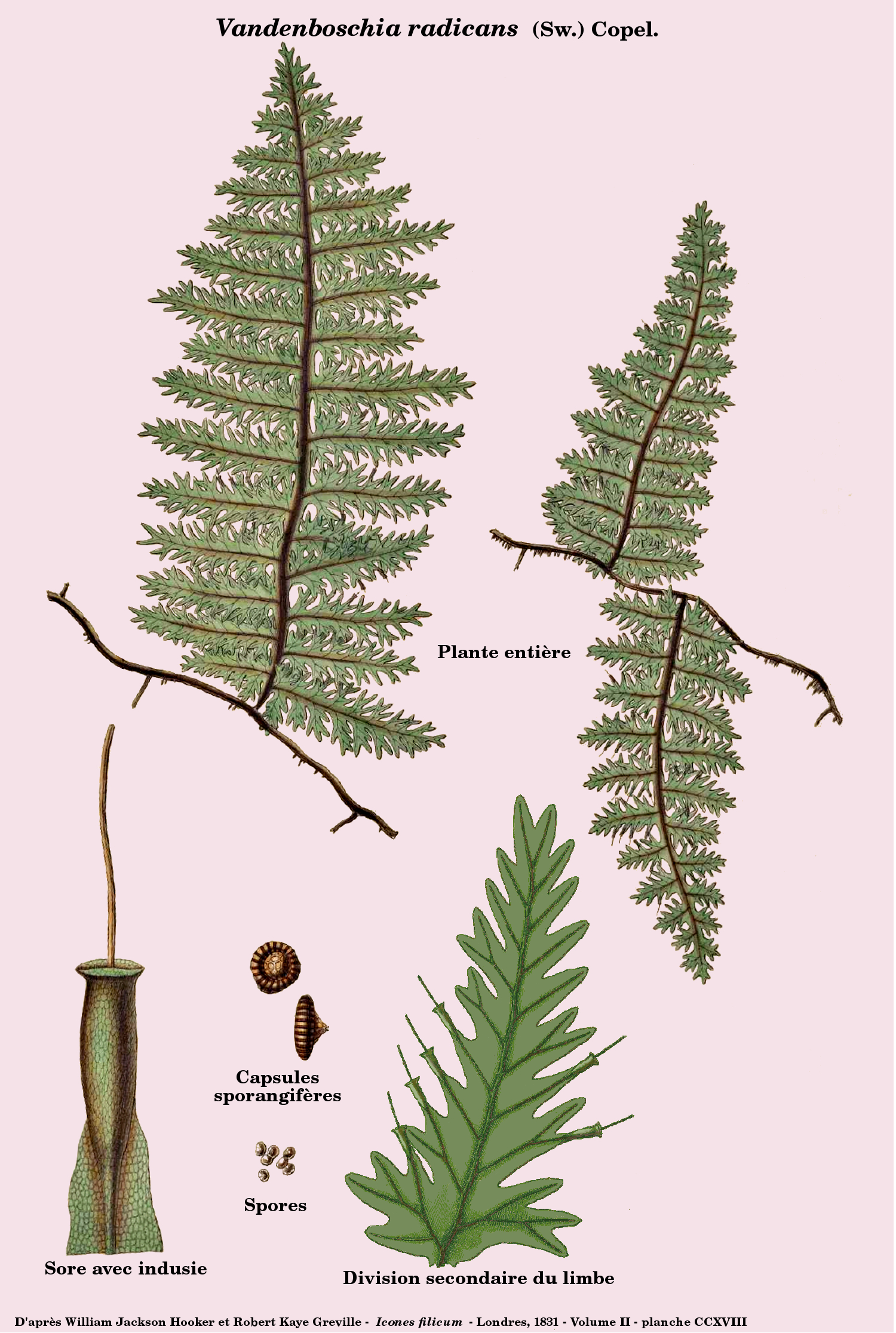
- Illustration of Vandenboschia radicans

Scientific classification
- Kingdom: Plantae
- Clade: Tracheophytes
- Division: Polypodiophyta
- Class: Polypodiopsida
- Order: Hymenophyllales
- Family: Hymenophyllaceae
- Subfamily: Trichomanoideae
- Genus: Vandenboschia; Copel.

Type species
- Vandenboschia radicans (Swartz) Copeland

Species
- See text.

Synonyms
- Lacosteopsis (Prantl) Nakaike

= Vandenboschia =

Genus of ferns

Vandenboschia is a fern genus in the family Hymenophyllaceae. The genus is accepted in the Pteridophyte Phylogeny Group classification of 2016 (PPG I) but not by some other sources.

== Taxonomy ==
The genus Vandenboschia was erected by Edwin Copeland in 1938. Its status, like other genera in the family Hymenophyllaceae, remains disputed. The Pteridophyte Phylogeny Group classification of 2016 (PPG I) accepts the genus, saying that there are about 15 species. As of October 2019, the Checklist of Ferns and Lycophytes of the World listed 25 species and one hybrid, whereas Plants of the World Online subsumed the genus into Trichomanes.

=== Phylogeny ===
Phylogeny by Fern Tree of Life.

- - (Lacosteopsis)
    - V. auriculata (Blume) Copel.
    - V. rupestris (Raddi) Ebihara & K.Iwats.
  - (Vandenboschia)
    - - - V. speciosa (Willd.) G.Kunkel
        - - V. boschiana (J.W.Sturm ex Bosch) Ebihara & K.Iwats.
          - V. kalamocarpa (Hayata) Ebihara
      - - V. davallioides (Gaudich.) Copel.
        - - V. cyrtotheca (Hillebr.) Copel.
          - V. tubiflora F.S.Wagner
    - - - V. cystoseiroides (Christ ex Tardieu & C.Chr.) Ching
        - V. striata (D.Don) Ebihara
      - - - V. confusa Dubuisson, Deblauwe & Bouch.-Dubuisson
          - V. gigantea (Bory ex Willd.) Pic. Serm.
        - - - V. collariata (Bosch) Ebihara & K.Iwats.
            - V. radicans (Sw.) Copel.
          - - V. johnstonensis (Bailey) Copel.
            - - V. liukiuensis (Yabe) Tagawa 1951
              - V. maxima (Blume) Copel.

Other species:

- Vandenboschia amabilis (Nakai) K.Iwats.
- Vandenboschia birmanica (Bedd.) Ching
- Vandenboschia fargesii (Christ) Ching
- Vandenboschia hokurikuensis Ebihara
- Vandenboschia lofoushanensis Ching
- Vandenboschia miuraensis Ebihara
- Vandenboschia nipponica (Nakai) Ebihara
- Vandenboschia obtusa (Copel.) comb. ined.
- Vandenboschia oshimensis (Christ) Ebihara
- Vandenboschia × quelpaertensis (Nakai) Ebihara
- Vandenboschia subclathrata K.Iwats.
