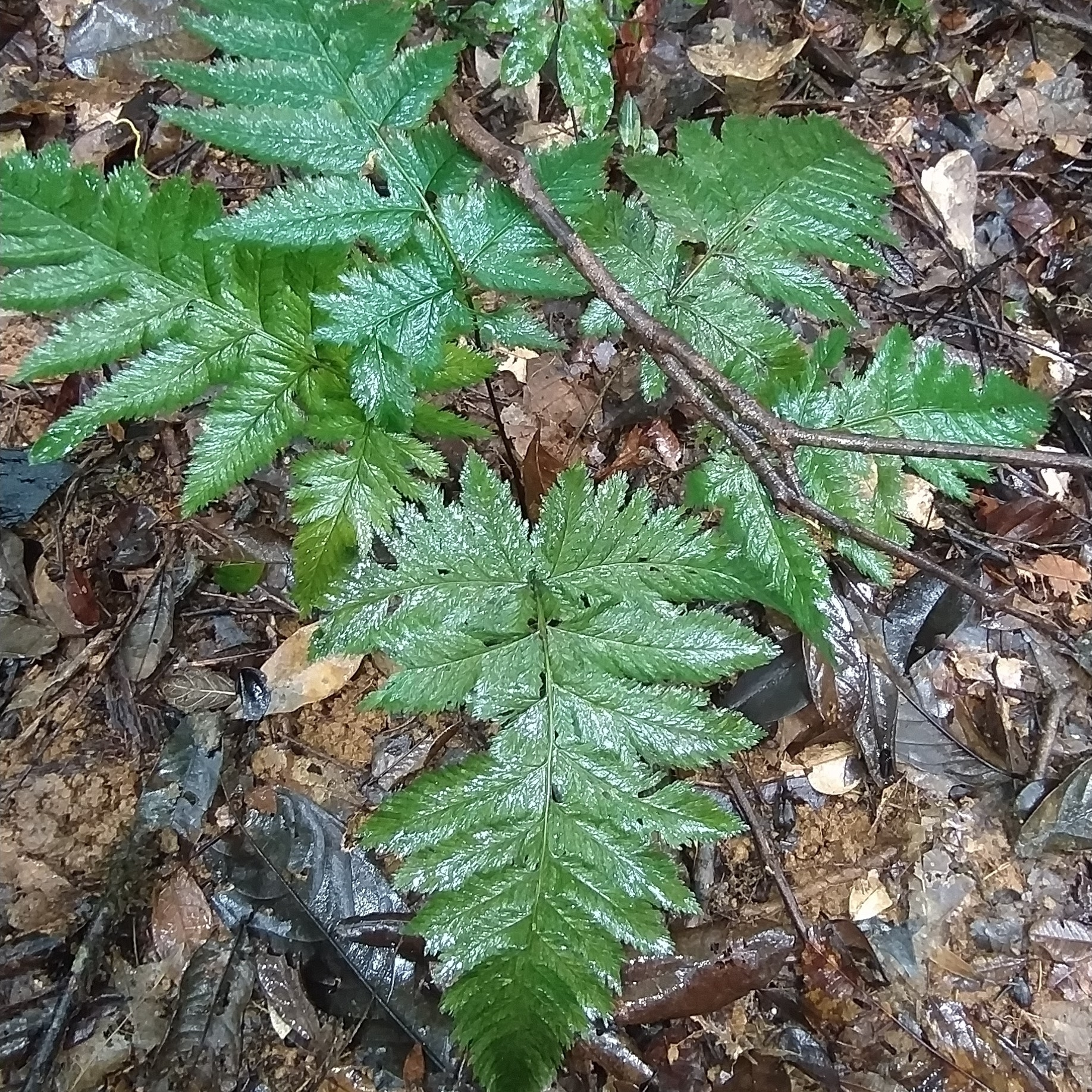

Scientific classification
- Kingdom: Plantae
- Clade: Tracheophytes
- Division: Polypodiophyta
- Class: Polypodiopsida
- Order: Hymenophyllales
- Family: Hymenophyllaceae
- Genus: Trichomanes
- Species: T. elegans

Binomial name
- Trichomanes elegans Rich.

Synonyms
- Adiantopsis elegans (Rich.) Bosch; Cephalomanes elegans (Rich.) K.Iwats.; Davalliopsis elegans (Rich.) Copel.; Davalliopsis prieurii (Kunze) Bosch; Plenasium bromeliifolium (C.Presl) C.Presl; Plenasium oxyodon (Miq.) A.E.Bobrov; Trichomanes anceps Hook.; Trichomanes elegans var. weddellii (Bosch) Hieron.; Trichomanes lastreoides C.Presl; Trichomanes leprieurii Hook.; Trichomanes prieurii Kunze; Trichomanes weddellii Bosch

= Trichomanes elegans =

Species of fern

Trichomanes elegans is a fern species in the family Hymenophyllaceae. The name has also been used incorrectly for two different species. It has specialized plastids called 'iridoplasts', which give its leaves an iridescent blue color.

== Taxonomy ==
Trichomanes elegans was first described by Louis Claude Richard in 1792. Two other species were later called Trichomanes elegans:

- Trichomanes elegans Poir. is an illegitimate synonym of Davallia denticulata (Burm.) Mett.
- Trichomanes elegans Rudge is an illegitimate synonym of Trichomanes diversifrons (Bory) Mett.
