= Callistopteris baueriana =

Scientific classification
- Kingdom: Plantae
- Clade: Tracheophytes
- Division: Polypodiophyta
- Class: Polypodiopsida
- Order: Hymenophyllales
- Family: Hymenophyllaceae
- Genus: Callistopteris
- Species: C. baueriana

Binomial name
- Callistopteris baueriana (Endl.) Copel.

Synonyms
- Trichomanes bauerianum Endl.; Cephalomanes bauerianum (Endl.) P.S.Green

Species of fern

Callistopteris bauerianum, known as the large filmy fern and Bauer's bristle fern, is a fern in the family Hymenophyllaceae. The specific epithet honours the Austrian botanical artist, Frederick Lucas Bauer (1760–1826), who collected plants on Norfolk Island in 1804–1805.

== Description ==
The plant is a terrestrial or lithophytic fern. It has a short, erect rhizome, supported by coarse roots, with dark brown, filiform scales. Its tripinnate fronds combine a 5–25 cm tall stipe with a lanceolate lamina 10–30 cm long.

== Distribution and habitat ==
The fern is endemic to Australia's subtropical Lord Howe and Norfolk Islands in the Tasman Sea; it grows in deep shade beside forest streams.
