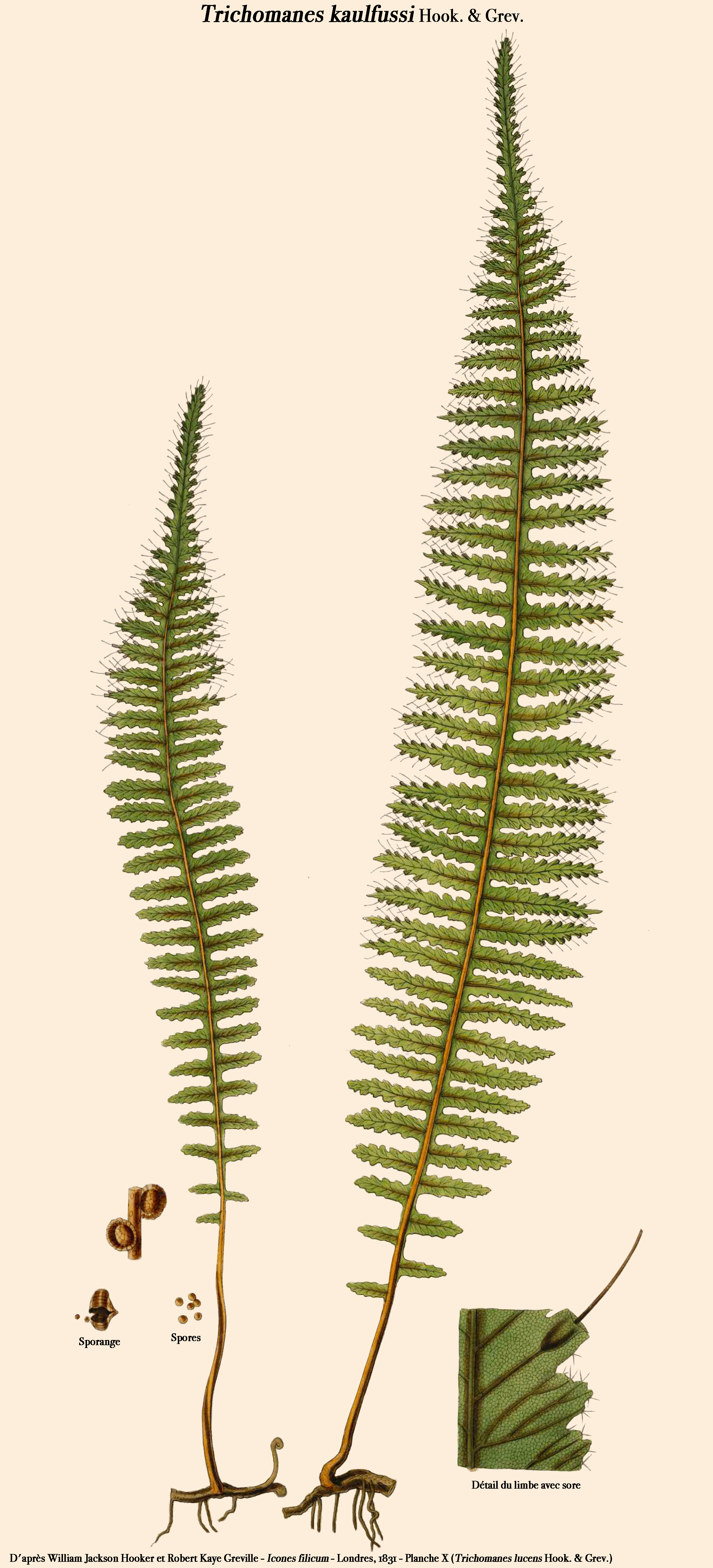

Scientific classification
- Kingdom: Plantae
- Clade: Embryophytes
- Clade: Tracheophytes
- Division: Polypodiophyta
- Class: Polypodiopsida
- Order: Hymenophyllales
- Family: Hymenophyllaceae
- Subfamily: Trichomanoideae
- Genus: Trichomanes; L.

Type species
- Trichomanes scandens L.

Species
- See text

Synonyms
- Achomanes Neck.; Bergera W.Schaffn. ex Fée; Feea Bory; Hemiphlebium C.Presl; Holophlebium Christ; Homoeotes C.Presl; Hymenostachys Bory; Lacostea Bosch; Lecanium C.Presl; Leptomanes Prantl; Leucomanes C.Presl; Maschalosorus Bosch; Mortoniopteris Pic.Serm.; Muelleria W.Schaffn. ex E.Fourn.; Neuromanes Trevis.; Neurophyllum C.Presl; Odontomanes C.Presl; Pteromanes Pic.Serm.; Ptilophyllum Bosch; Pyxidaria Gled.; Ragatelus C.Presl; Trigonophyllum (Prantl) Pic.Serm.; Davalliopsis Bosch; Trichomanes subg. Davalliopsis (Bosch) Ebihara & K.Iwats.

= Trichomanes =

Genus of ferns

Trichomanes is a genus of ferns in the family Hymenophyllaceae, termed bristle ferns. The circumscription of the genus is disputed. All ferns in the genus are filmy ferns, with leaf tissue typically 2 cells thick. This thinness generally necessitates a permanently humid habitat, and makes the fronds somewhat translucent. Because of this membrane-like frond tissue, the plant is prone to drying out. "Filmy ferns" in the taxa Hymenophyllaceae grow in constantly wet environments. Many are found in cloud forests such as "Choco" in Colombia. There are also members of the taxa that can grow submersed in water.

The name bristle fern refers to the small bristle that protrudes from the indusia of these ferns.

== Taxonomy ==
The genus Trichomanes was first described by Carl Linnaeus in 1753. Its status, like other genera in the subfamily Trichomanoideae, remains disputed. The Pteridophyte Phylogeny Group classification of 2016 (PPG I) accepts the genus as one of eight in the subfamily Trichomanoideae, saying that there are about 60 species. As of October 2019, the Checklist of Ferns and Lycophytes of the World listed about 70 species. Other sources, including Plants of the World Online as of October 2019, treated Trichomanes as the only genus in the subfamily Trichomanoideae, so that it included all the other genera, and had about 250 species.

=== Phylogeny ===
Phylogeny of Trichomanes

- - - - (Feea)
        - - T. mougeotii Bosch
          - T. trollii Bergdolt
        - - T. diversifrons (Bory) Mett.
          - - T. botryoides Kaulf.
            - T. osmundoides DC. ex Poir.
    - - - (Afrotrichomanes)
          - T. guineense Afzel. ex Swartz 1800
          - - T. cupressoides Desv.
            - - T. boivinii Bosch
              - T. madagascariense (Bosch) Moore
      - - - (Asiatrichomanes)
            T. superbum Backhouse ex Moore
        - - (Davalliopsis)
            T. elegans Rich.
          - (Lacostea)
            - T. tanaicum Hook.
            - - T. pedicellatum Desv.
              - - T. ankersii Parker
                - T. tuerckheimii Christ
  - - (Trichomanes)
      - - section Neuromanes
          - T. hostmannianum (Klotzsch) Kunze
          - - T. pinnatum Hedw.
            - T. vittaria DC.
      - - T. cellulosum Klotzsch 1844
        - - - - T. bicorne Hook.
              - T. spruceanum Hook.
            - - T. arbuscula Desv.
              - - T. holopterum Kunze (Entire-winged bristle fern)
                - T. roraimense Jenman
          - - section Trichomanes
              - T. lucens Sw.
              - - T. trigonum Desv.
                - - - T. alatum Sw.
                    - T. scandens L.
                  - - T. anadromum Rosenst.
                    - T. polypodioides L.
            - section Achomanes
              - - T. crispum L.
                - T. martiusii C.Presl
              - - - T. crinitum Sw.
                  - T. galeottii E.Fourn.
                - - T. robustum E.Fourn.
                  - - T. crispiforme Alston
                    - - T. vandenboschii P.G.Windisch
                      - - T. accedens C.Presl
                        - - T. egleri P.G.Windisch
                          - T. pilosum Raddi

Unassigned species:
- Trichomanes anomalum Maxon & Morton
- Trichomanes aureovestitum Proctor
- Trichomanes bancroftii Hook. & Grev.
- Trichomanes bissei C.Sánchez
- Trichomanes caliginum Lellinger
- Trichomanes crassipilis Weath.
- Trichomanes cristatum Kaulf.
- Trichomanes dactylites Sodiro
- Trichomanes delicatum Bosch
- Trichomanes ebiharae Fraser-Jenk. & Kholia
- Trichomanes guidoi P.G.Windisch
- Trichomanes humboldtii (Bosch) Lellinger
- Trichomanes jenmanii Lellinger
- Trichomanes kalbreyeri Baker
- Trichomanes killipii Weath.
- Trichomanes laciniosum Alston
- Trichomanes lozanoi M.T.Murillo
- Trichomanes ludovicianum Rosenst.
- Trichomanes macilentum Bosch
- Trichomanes micayense Hieron.
- Trichomanes murilloanum A.Rojas
- Trichomanes padronii Proctor
- Trichomanes paucisorum R.C.Moran & B.Øllg.
- Trichomanes pellucens Kunze
- Trichomanes pinnatifidum Bosch
- Trichomanes plumosum Kunze
- Trichomanes poeppigii C.Presl
- Trichomanes procerum Fée
- Trichomanes resinosum R.C.Moran
- Trichomanes ribae Pacheco
- Trichomanes sellowianum C.Presl
- Trichomanes steyermarkii P.G.Windisch & A.R.Sm.
- Trichomanes sublabiatum Bosch
- Trichomanes superbum Bosch
- Trichomanes trichopodium A.Rojas
- Trichomanes vaupesensis Lellinger

Species formerly placed in this genus include:

- Trichomanes angustatum Carmich. = Polyphlebium angustatum (Carmich.) Ebihara & Dubuisson
- Trichomanes bauerianum Endl. = Callistopteris baueriana (Endl.) Copel – Bauer's bristle fern
- Trichomanes boryanum Kunze 1840 = Cephalomanes atrovirens C.Presl
- Trichomanes boschianum Sturm ex Bosch = Vandenboschia boschiana (J.W.Sturm ex Bosch) Ebihara & K.Iwats. – Appalachian bristle fern
- Trichomanes caudatum Brack. = Abrodictyum caudatum (Brack.) Ebihara & K.Iwats.
- Trichomanes intricatum Farrar = Crepidomanes intricatum (Farrar) Ebihara & Weakley – Weft fern
- Trichomanes melanopus Baker = Didymoglossum melanopus (Baker) Copel.
- Trichomanes petersii A.Gray = Didymoglossum petersii (A. Gray) Copel. – Dwarf bristle fern
- Trichomanes reniforme G.Forst = Hymenophyllum nephrophyllum Ebihara & K. Iwats.
- Trichomanes speciosum Willd. = Vandenboschia speciosa (Willd.) G. Kunkel
- Trichomanes tenuissimum Bosch = Polyphlebium tenuissimum (Bosch) comb. ined.
- Trichomanes venosum R.Br. = Polyphlebium venosum (R.Br.) Copel.
