= Roelof Benjamin van den Bosch =

Dutch botanist (1810–1862)

- Born: 31 October 1810; Rotterdam
- Died: 28 January 1862 (aged 51); Goes
- Scientific career
- Fields: Botany, Bryology
- Author abbrev. (botany): Bosch

Roelof Benjamin van den Bosch (1810–1862) was a Dutch botanist known for studying ferns and mosses.

The standard author abbreviation Bosch is used to indicate this person as the author when citing a botanical name.

== Works ==
- Bryologia Javanica seu descriptio muscorum frondosorum Archipelagi Indici iconibus illustrata - auctoribus F. Dozy et J. H. Molkenboer. Post mortem auctorum edentibus R. B. van den Bosch et C. M. van den Sande Lacoste - E. J. Brill in Lugduni-Batavorum - Leiden, 1855-1870 Downloadable on Biblioteca Digital
- Prodromus florae batavae - Editio altera. Nieuwe lijst der Nederlandsche phanerogamen en vaatkryptogamen. Uitgegeven door de Nederlandsche Botanische Vereniging. Nijmegen, F.E. Macdonald, 1901–1916
- Plantae Junghuhnianae - Leiden, 1856
- Hymenophyllaceae Javanicae, sive Descriptio hymenophyllacearum archipelagi Indici iconibus illustrata - Leiden, 1861

== Eponyms ==
- Vandenboschia in the family Hymenophyllaceae.
