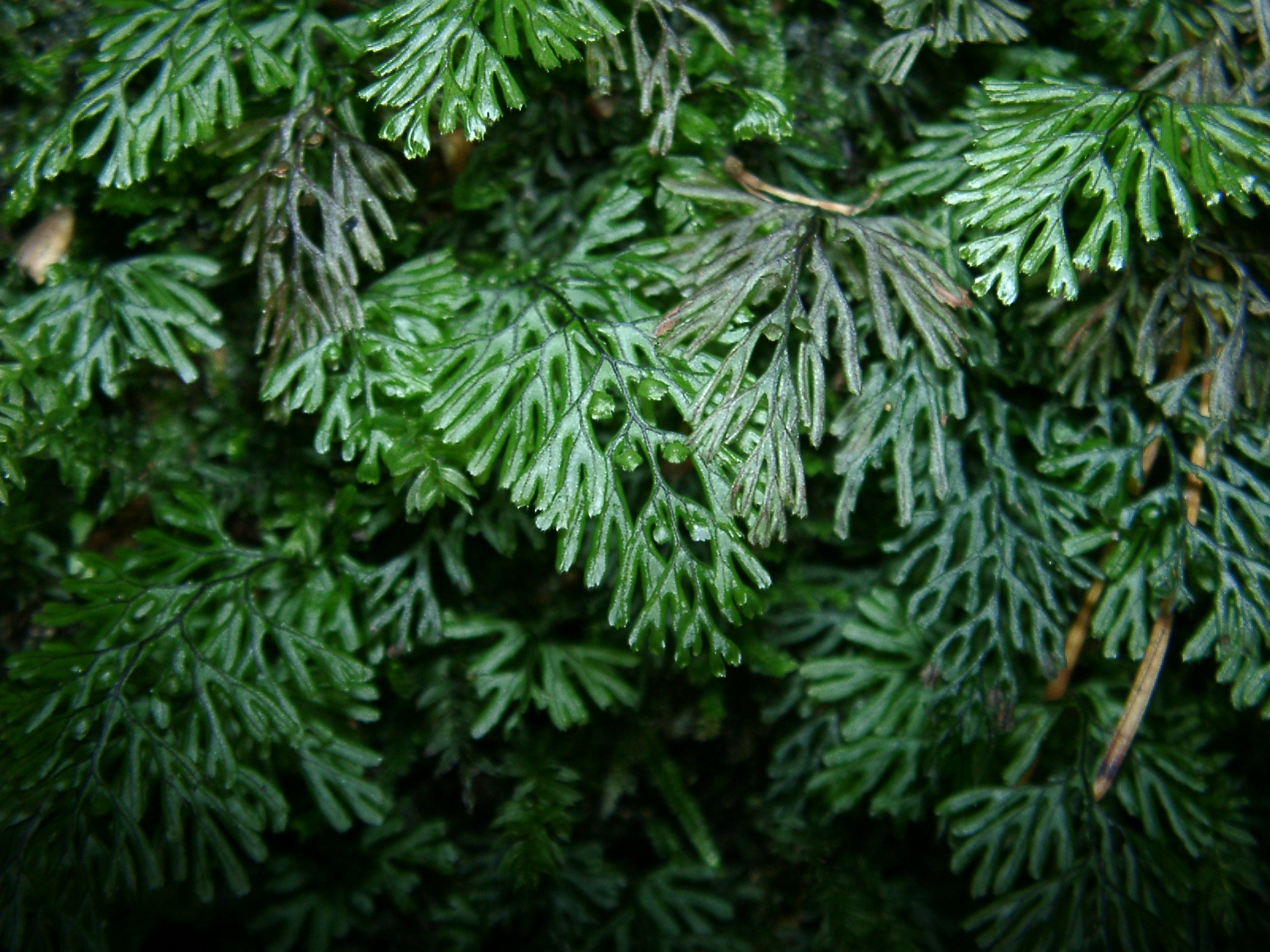
- Hymenophyllum tunbrigense in Luxembourg

Scientific classification
- Kingdom: Plantae
- Clade: Embryophytes
- Clade: Tracheophytes
- Division: Polypodiophyta
- Class: Polypodiopsida
- Subclass: Polypodiidae
- Order: Hymenophyllales; A.B.Frank
- Family: Hymenophyllaceae; Link

Genera
- See text

= Hymenophyllaceae =

Hymenophyllaceae Temporal range: Upper Triassic–Recent

Family of ferns

The Hymenophyllaceae, the filmy ferns and bristle ferns, are a family of two to nine genera (depending on classification system) and about 650 known species of ferns, with a subcosmopolitan distribution, but generally restricted to very damp places or to locations where they are wetted by spray from waterfalls or springs. Fossil evidence shows that ferns of the family Hymenophyllaceae have existed since at least the Upper Triassic.

== Description ==
They often appear as very dark green or even black clumps and may be mistaken for a robust moss or liverwort. The rhizome is usually thin and wiry and the fronds variously pinnate with a single strand ("nerve") of vascular tissue. As in most ferns, young fronds have circinate vernation. In most species, the frond, apart from the vascular tissue, is only a single cell thick, and they do not have any stomata. The cuticle is also greatly reduced or absent, leaving filmy ferns poikilohydric and very susceptible to desiccation where a reliable water supply is not present. The leaves occasionally bear hairs, but scales are generally not present. The sori are borne at the leaf margins at the end of the nerve. They are protected by conical, bivalvate, or tubular indusia. Within the sori, sporangia mature starting at the apex of the sorus and progressing to the base. They have a continuous, oblique annulus and release round, green trilete spores. The spores grow into thread- or ribbon-like gametophytes; in many species, the gametophyte has an extended, independent lifespan and can reproduce asexually by fragmenting or releasing gemmae.

Individual plants may persist for many years.

== Taxonomy ==
In the molecular phylogenetic classification of Smith et al. in 2006, the Hymenophyllales, containing the single family Hymenophyllaceae, were placed in class Polypodiopsida sensu stricto (the leptosporangiate ferns). The linear sequence of Christenhusz et al. (2011), intended for compatibility with the classification of Chase and Reveal (2009) which placed all land plants in Equisetopsida, reclassified Smith's Polypodiopsida as subclass Polypodiidae and placed the Hymenophyllales there. The circumscription of the order and its families was not changed, and that circumscription and placement in Polypodiidae has subsequently been followed in the classifications of Christenhusz and Chase (2014) and PPG I (2016).

The division of the family into genera was disputed, as of October 2019. Traditionally, only two genera of Hymenophyllaceae have been recognized: (1) Hymenophyllum with bivalved involucres, and (2) Trichomanes s.l. with tubular involucres. Subsequent proposals have created 34 genera (Copeland 1938), 6 genera (Morton 1968), 47 genera (Sermolli 1977), and 8 genera (Iwatsuki 1984). These classifications all had only limited regional acceptance. Recent molecular phylogenic studies do show two distinct monophyletic clades of fairly equal size, but they are only roughly aligned with the two traditional genera. For example, the traditional Trichomanes subtaxa Pleuromanes and Cardiomanes were shown to belong to the "hymenophylloid" clade. To reflect these recent discoveries Atsushi Ebihara and Kunio Iwatsuki, in 2006, revised the taxonomy of Hymenophyllaceae to place all species of the "hymenophylloid" clade in a single genus Hymenophyllum, and to place the eight clear "trichomanoid" subclades in eight corresponding genera.

This subdivision was recognized by Smith et al. in 2006 and Christenhusz et al. in 2011, but Christenhusz and Chase, in 2014, reverted to combining the trichomanoid clades into Trichomanes. The PPG I classification of 2016 again recognizes the segregate genera (and treats the two clades as subfamilies, Hymenophylloideae and Trichomanoideae), although the segregate genera are not always accepted by contemporary floras; e.g., as of 2016, the Flora of New Zealand preferred to recognize Trichomanes s.l. due to the difficulty of morphologically distinguishing the segregate genera.

=== Genera ===
The genera used in PPG I and the subgenera assigned by the system of Ebihara et al. are:

Phylogeny of Hymenophyllaceae

- - Hymenophylloideae
    Hymenophyllum
  - Trichomanoideae
    - - Abrodictyum
      - Cephalomanes
    - - Trichomanes s.s.
      - - Callistopteris
        - - Polyphlebium
          - - Didymoglossum
            - - Crepidomanes
              - Vandenboschia

Phylogeny of Hymenophyllaceae

- - Hymenophylloideae
    Hymenophyllum
  - Trichomanoideae
    - Trichomaneae
      - Callistopteris
      - - - Cephalomanes
          - Abrodictyum
        - - Abrodictyum obscurum
          - Trichomanes s.s.
    - Didymoglosseae
      - Polyphlebium
      - - Didymoglossum
        - - Vandenboschia
          - Crepidomanes

- Hymenophylloideae (the "hymenophylloid" clade):
  - Hymenophyllum Sm. 1793 – about 250 species
    - subg. Hymenophyllum – about 100 species
    - subg. Sphaerocionium (C.Presl) C.Chr. 1934 – about 70 species
    - subg. Mecodium C.Presl ex Copel. 1937 – more than 35 species
    - subg. Globosa (Prantl) Ebihara & K.Iwats. 2006 – about 25 species
    - subg. Pleuromanes (C.Presl) Ebihara & K.Iwats. 2006 – 5 species
    - subg. Myrmecostylum (C.Presl) Ebihara & K. Iwats. 2006 – at least 8 species
    - subg. Hymenoglossum (C.Presl) R.M.Tryon & A.F.Tryon 1981 – at least 3 species
    - subg. Fuciformia Ebihara & K.Iwats. 2006 – 2 species
    - subg. Diploöphyllum (Bosch) Ebihara & K.Iwats. 2006 – 1 species
    - subg. Cardiomanes (C. Presl) Ebihara & K.Iwats. 2006 – 1 species
- Trichomanoideae (the "trichomanoid" clade) (sometimes all included in a single broad genus Trichomanes with about 400 species):
  - Didymoglossum Desv. 1827 – more than 30 species
    - subg. Didymoglossum – more than 20 species
    - subg. Microgonium (C.Presl) Ebihara & K.Iwats. 2006 – more than 10 species
  - Crepidomanes (C.Presl) C.Presl 1849 – more than 30 species
    - subg. Crepidomanes
    - subg. Nesopteris (Copel.) Ebihara & K.Iwats. 2006
  - Polyphlebium Copel. 1938 – about 15 species
  - Vandenboschia Copel. 1938 – more than 15 species
    - subg. Vandenboschia – more than 15 species
    - subg. Lacosteopsis (Prantl) Ebihara & K.Iwats. 2006 – at least 2 species
  - Abrodictyum C.Presl 1843 – about 25 species
    - subg. Abrodictyum – about 15 species
    - subg. Pachychaetum (C.Presl) Ebihara & K.Iwats. 2006 – more than 10 species
  - Trichomanes L. 1753 – more than 60 species
    - subg. Afrotrichomanes Dubuisson & Ebihara 2021
    - subg. Davalliopsis (Bosch) Ebihara & K.Iwats. 2006 – at least 1 species
    - subg. Feea (Bory) Hook. 1844 – more than 5 species
    - subg. Lacostea (Bosch) C. Chr. 1906 – more than 4 species
    - subg. Trichomanes – more than 30 species
  - Cephalomanes C.Presl 1843 – about 4 species
  - Callistopteris Copel. 1938 – about 5 species

== Distribution and habitat ==
The great majority of the species are found in tropical rainforests, but some also occur in temperate rainforests (particularly New Zealand, with 25 species) and slightly drier forest regions. In Europe they are restricted to the Atlantic Ocean fringes of the continent, notably in the Azores, Ireland, and western Great Britain, but one species (Hymenophyllum tunbrigense) locally east to Luxembourg, another (H. wilsonii) so far north as West Norway, Faeroes and South Iceland, while in North America, they are restricted (often occurring solely as gametophytes) to the humid eastern third of the continent and the rainforests of the Pacific Northwest.
