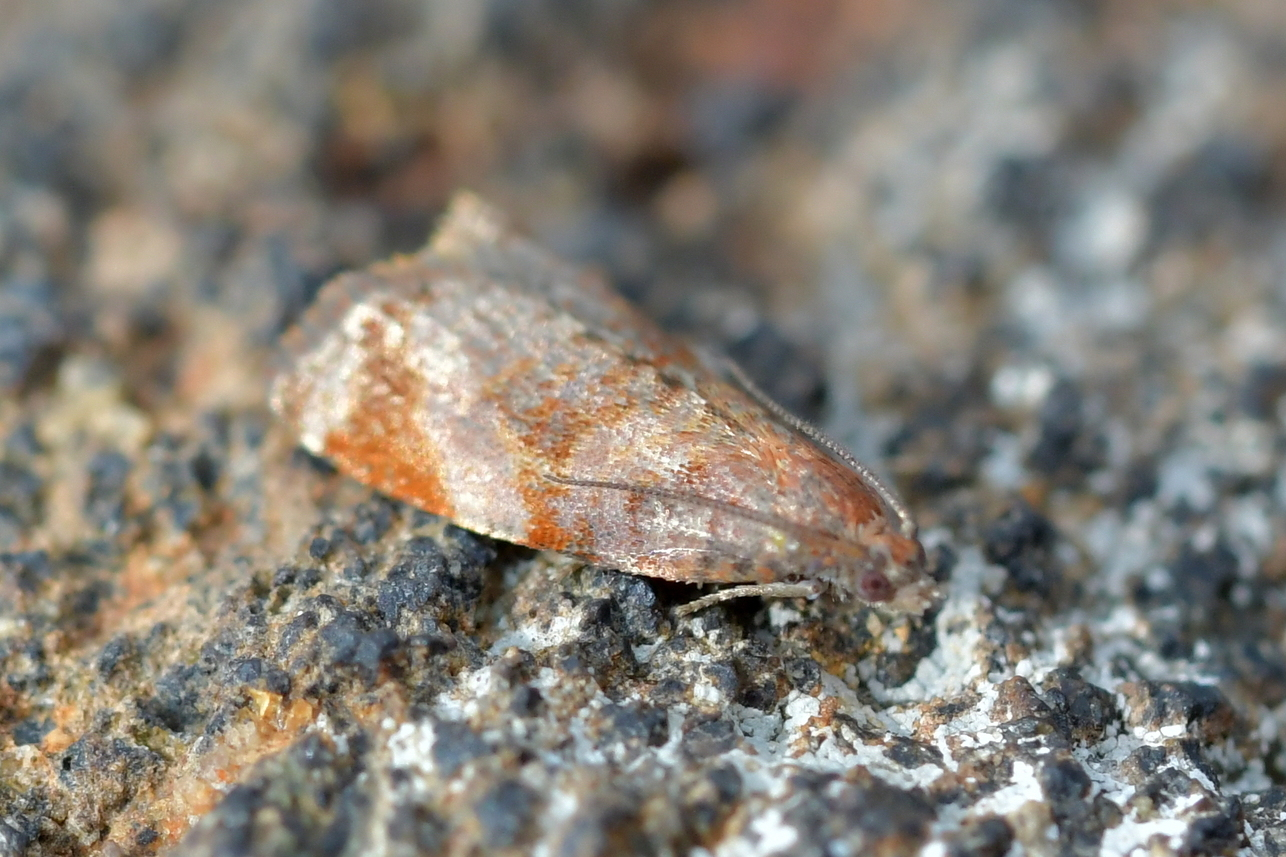

Scientific classification
- Kingdom: Animalia
- Phylum: Arthropoda
- Class: Insecta
- Order: Lepidoptera
- Family: Tortricidae
- Genus: Tortrix
- Species: T. fervida

Binomial name
- Tortrix fervida (Meyrick, 1901)

Synonyms
- Cacoecia fervida Meyrick, 1901

= Tortrix fervida =

Species of moth, endemic to New Zealand

Tortrix fervida is a species of moth of the family Tortricidae. It is endemic to New Zealand and has been observed in both the North and South Islands. The larvae feed on species of fern in the genus Hymenophyllum including Hymenophyllum nephrophyllum. The adult moths are variable in appearance and are day flying. They are on the wing from November until January. This species is regarded as being uncommon.

== Taxonomy ==
This species was first described by Edward Meyrick in 1901 using a male specimen collected by George Hudson in Kaitoke in November and named Cacoecia fervida. George Hudson discussed and illustrated this species in his 1928 book The butterflies and moths of New Zealand under the name Tortrix fervida. It is likely that this species belongs to another genus and as such this species is also known as Tortrix (s.l.) fervida. The male holotype specimen is held at the Natural History Museum, London.

== Description ==
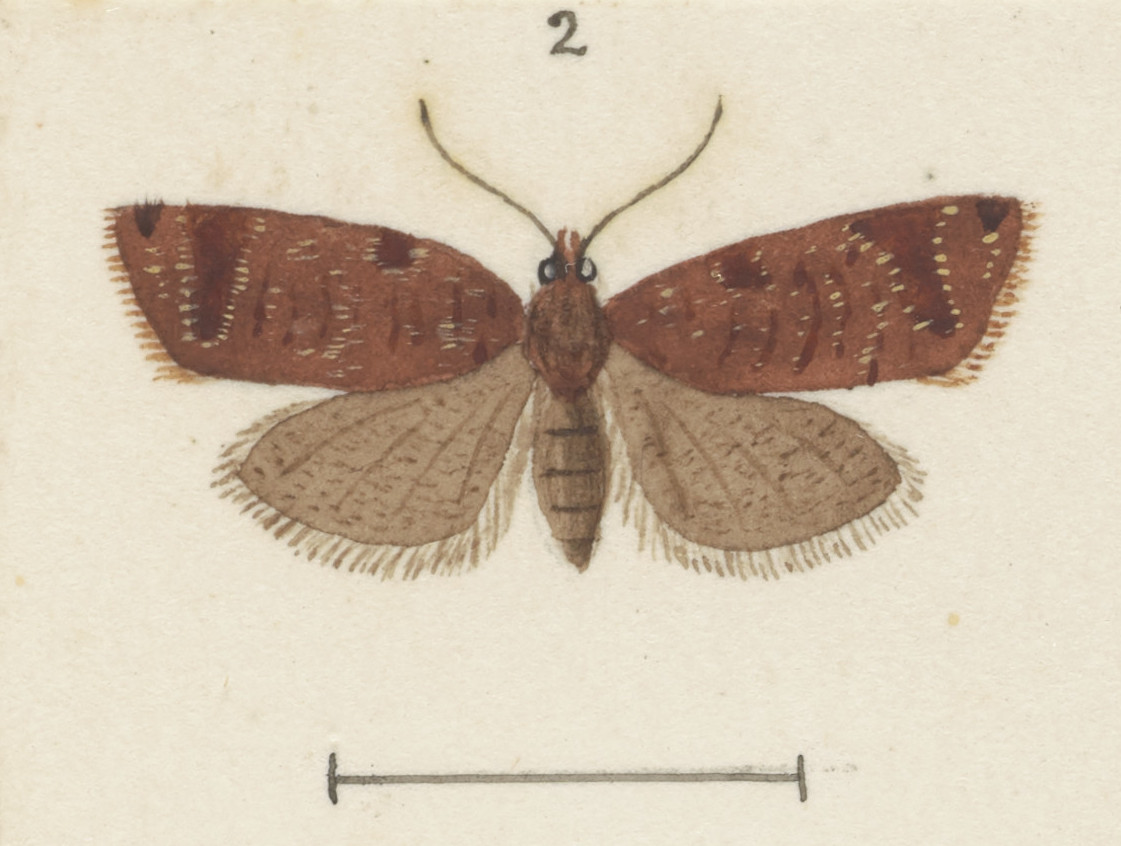
Illustration of female.

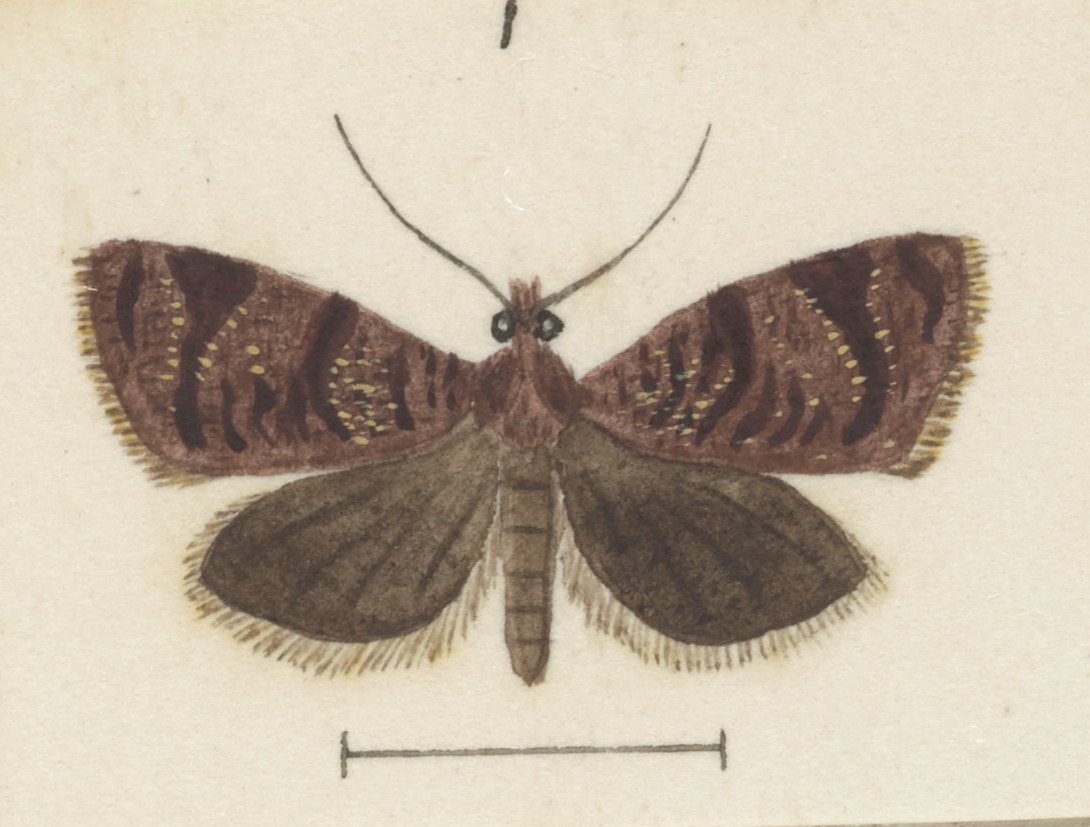
Illustration of male.

The larvae of this species are approximately 1 cm long when mature, with a brown head and a darker green coloured body. They have tiny hair like structures to assist in keeping them dry when moving amongst the damp fronds of their host plants.

Hudson described the adults of this species as follows:

The expansion of the wings is slightly over 1/2 inch. The fore-wings are rich pinkish-brown often slightly tinged with purple; there is a rather indistinct basal patch of crimson-brown; a curved, irregular band of very dark crimson brown near the middle of the wing often divided into several branches before the dorsum; another similar band from about 3/4 of the costa to the tornus; a small triangular mark of the same colour at the apex; the edges of all these bands are strongly sprinkled with golden yellow scales. The hind-wings are dark grey, darker near the termen. The female has the fore-wings slightly longer and narrower than the male and all the transverse bands are indistinct, except the one reaching from the costa to the tornus.

Hudson pointed out that adults of this species can vary in colour with some male specimens having spaces between their forewing bands that are paler in colour.

== Distribution ==
This species is endemic to New Zealand. It has been collected in both the North and South Islands including in Wellington, around Arthur's Pass and in the Southland region. It is regarded as uncommon.

== Behaviour ==
The larvae make a silk tube in which they hide. The adult moths fly during the day and are on the wing from November until January.

== Host plants ==
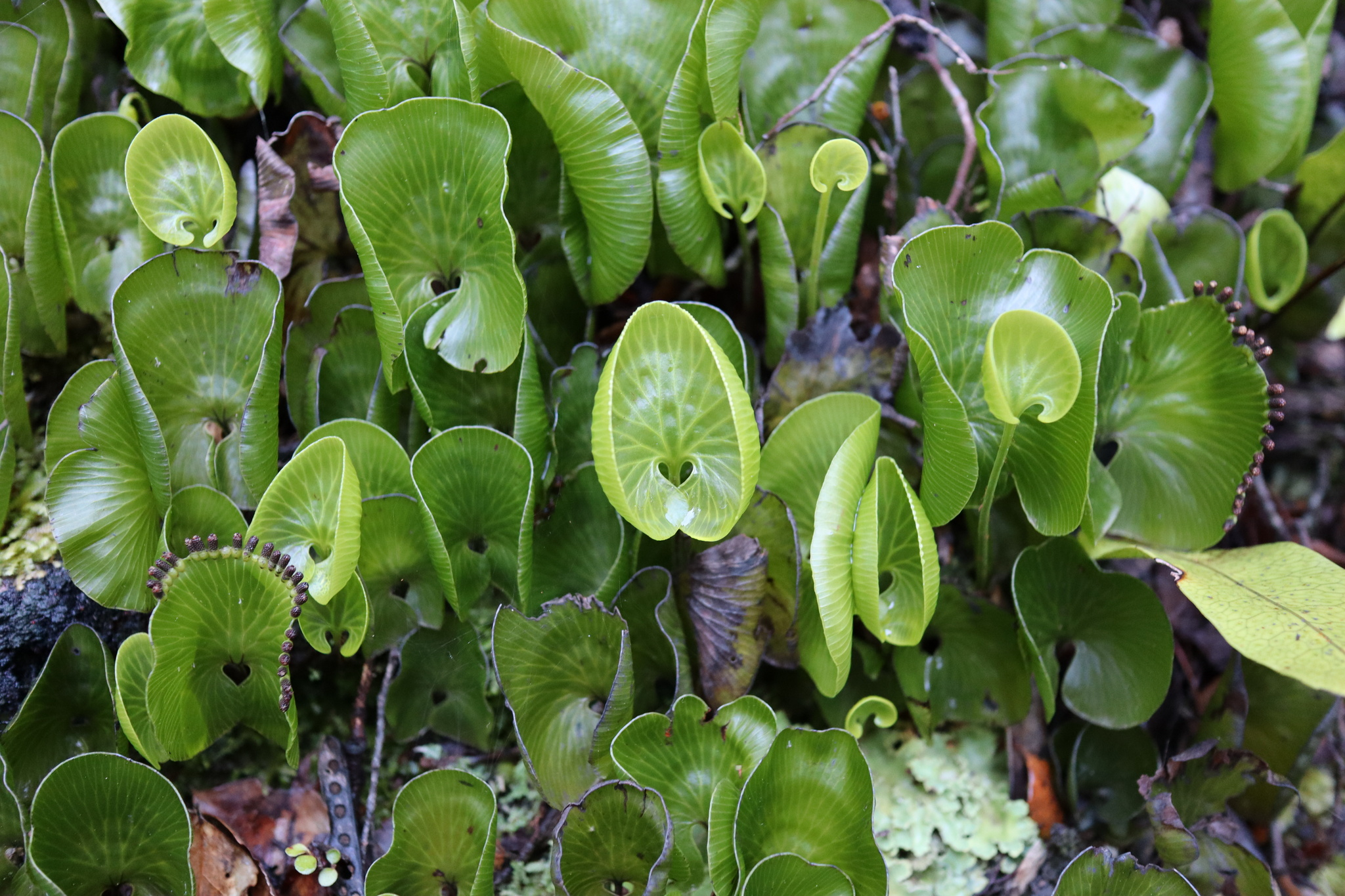
Larval host H. nephrophyllum.

The larval host plants of this species are in the genus Hymenophyllum and include Hymenophyllum nephrophyllum.
