= Pachyloma (disambiguation) =

Pachyloma may refer to:

- Pachyloma DC., a genus of flowering plants in the family Melastomataceae
- Pachyloma Spach, a genus of flowering plants in the family Ranunculaceae, synonym of Ranunculus
- Pachyloma Bosch, a genus of ferns in the family Hymenophyllaceae, synonym of Hymenophyllum
