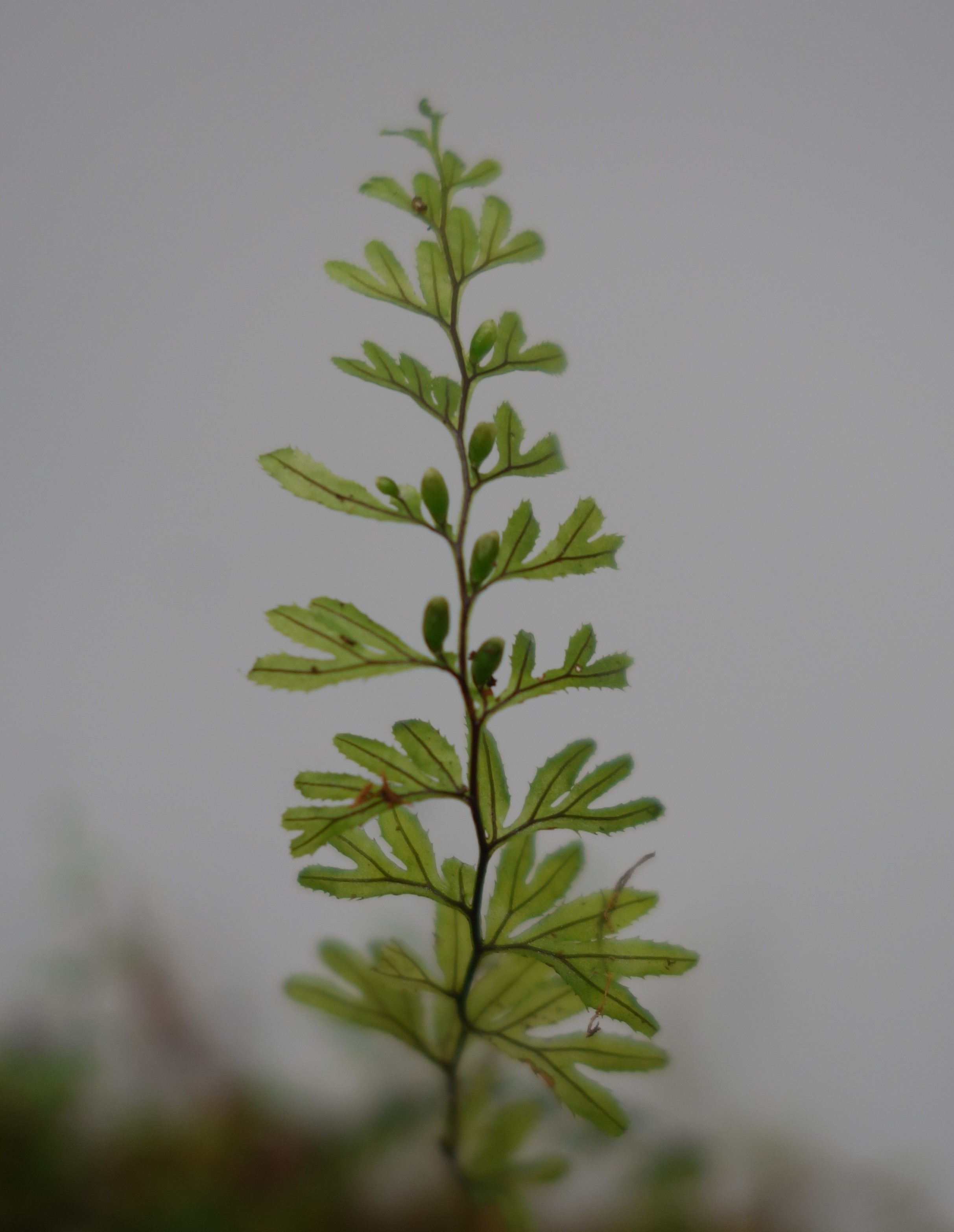

Scientific classification
- Kingdom: Plantae
- Clade: Tracheophytes
- Division: Polypodiophyta
- Class: Polypodiopsida
- Order: Hymenophyllales
- Family: Hymenophyllaceae
- Genus: Hymenophyllum
- Species: H. peltatum

Binomial name
- Hymenophyllum peltatum (Poir.) Desv.

= Hymenophyllum peltatum =

Species of fern

Hymenophyllum peltatum, also known as alpine filmy-fern, is a species of filmy fern widely distributed across Australia, New Zealand, South Africa, South America. It is predominantly a rainforest species with delicate foliage arrangements. Members of the Hymenophyllaceae family display almost translucent fronds, bearing thickness of just a single cell.

== Description ==
Rhizome: The glabrescent (near hairless) rhizome forms a creeping, interlacing thread across various substrates, including larger ferns such as Dicksonia antarctica, rocks and fallen logs.

Leaves: Each frond consists of several dark-green pinnae encompassing multiple lamina, with toothed margins and a single vein. Size can vary from 1.5 – 17 cm in length. H. peltatum is distinguished from otherwise similar relatives (such as H. cupressiforme) by the unique ‘apically winged’ foliage, where branching only occurs on the apex side (i.e. toward the main stem), known as acroscopic branching.

Sori occur (1-2) on the acroscopic side of the primary pinna. When mature, each sorus is attached by a small, peltate branch, hence the name H. peltatum. The sorus is a funnel-shaped receptacle, housing numerous sporangia, each approximately 1-2mm long and 0.5-1mm wide. The indusium forms a cleft of two-lips, which have entire margins protecting the developing sporangia.

== Habitat and distribution ==
While not as common as H. cupressiforme species, H. peltatum is widespread and known to occur in cool temperate to sub-tropical rainforests around the world, including Australia, New Zealand, South Africa and South America. One of 19 Hymenophyllum species found in Australia, H. peltatum can be observed across Tasmanian alpine regions, Victoria, NSW, and rarely in Queensland. Habitat includes wet, mossy banks, rocks and logs. It also occurs as an epiphyte on trees such as Nothofagus cunninghami and Atherosperma moschatum.

== Nomenclature ==
Hymenophyllaceae: displaying the thinnest fronds of any fern species, hymen is derived from the Greek word for 'membrane', and phyllon meaning 'leaf'. Another defining feature is the sorus structure, a two-flapped indusium which houses the sporangia in a protective receptacle, often clustered around a central axis. Subgenus Hymenophyllum is defined by the toothed margins of each lamina within a frond.

Peltatum: When mature, each sori is attached by a small, 'peltate' branch, hence the name H. peltatum which is derived from the Latin word peltatus, used to describe an organ attached by a central stalk.

'Alpine' filmy fern: This particular species is generally observed 600m above sea level.

== Conservation values ==
Warming temperatures, increased fire events and changes in land use could see reduced habitat potential for H.peltatum.

== Affinities ==
Easily confused with H. cupressiforme, which has slightly larger fronds and pinnae are branched on both sides.
