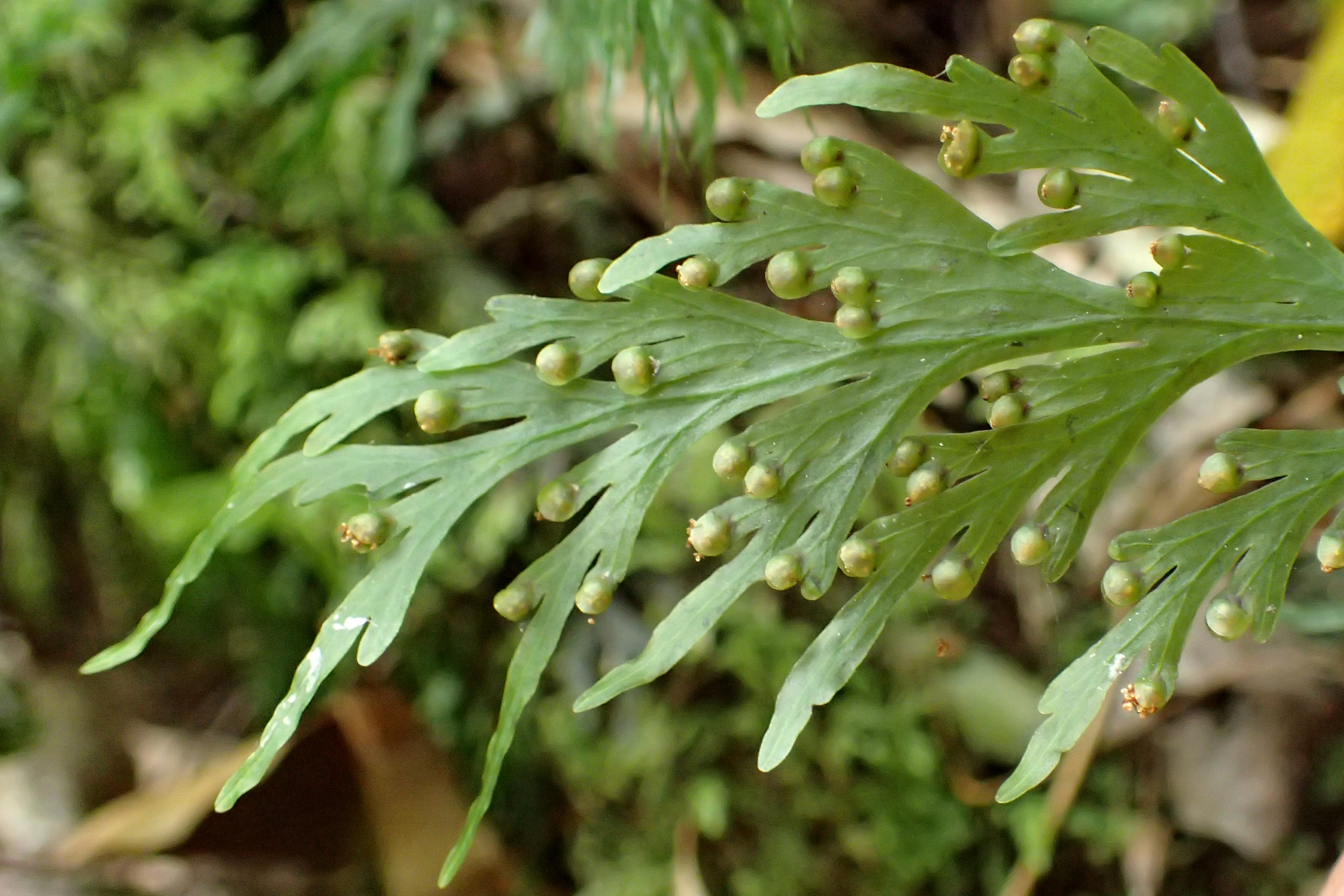

Scientific classification
- Kingdom: Plantae
- Clade: Embryophytes
- Clade: Tracheophytes
- Division: Polypodiophyta
- Class: Polypodiopsida
- Order: Hymenophyllales
- Family: Hymenophyllaceae
- Genus: Hymenophyllum
- Species: H. dilatatum

Binomial name
- Hymenophyllum dilatatum (G.Forst.) Sw.

= Hymenophyllum dilatatum =

Species of plant

Hymenophyllum dilatatum, commonly known by its Māori name matua mauku, is a filmy fern of Hymenophyllaceae in the genus Hymenophyllum. It is the largest of the New Zealand filmy ferns. Hymenophyllum dilatatum was first described in 1786 by German naturalist and author, Georg Forster, under the basionym Trichomanes dilatatum.

== Taxonomy ==
Hymenophyllum is derived from Greek hymen, meaning membranous, and phyllus, meaning leaved, which is a reference to the membranous fronds. The specific epithet Dilatatum is derived from the Latin word dilatatus meaning widened, a reference to the species' broad frond segments.

== Description ==
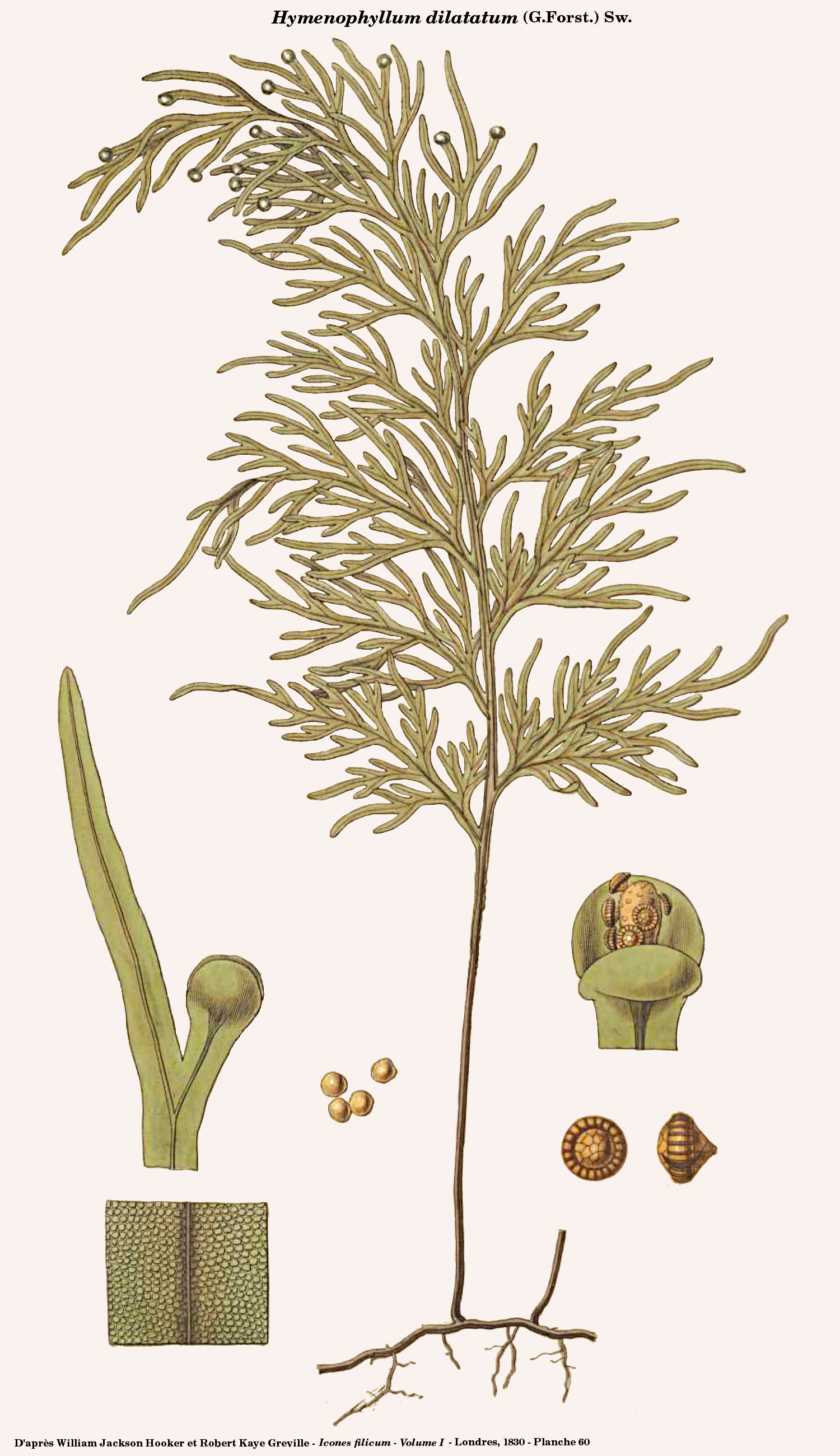
Hymenophyllum dilatatum illustration of physical features including;rhizome, leafy frond, stipe, sporangium, thick cell walls, and sorus.

Hymenophyllum dilatatum is a pteridophyte. Hymenophyllum dilatatum is distinctive in that the fronds are typically thicker than other Hymenophyllum species, often being up to 2-3 cells thick.

Hymenophyllum dilatatum has long, creeping rhizomes that serve as storage for nutrients and vegetative reproduction. These rhizomes are between 1-1.5 mm in diameter and are covered in 2 mm long, thick red-brown hairs. Their stipes are widely spaced on rhizomes, between 10–150 mm (0.39–5.91 in) long, can be brown or green, and are distinctly winged and narrow for at least half of their length. The stipes either have very few hairs or are glabrous.

Fronds are filmy and translucent, bright to dark green, and 60–570 mm (2.4–22.4 in) long, with laminae between 45–450 mm (1.8–17.7 in) long and 40–170 mm (1.6–6.7 in) wide. The fronds are divided into 3-4 pinnate leaflets that are ovate or lanceolate with smooth margins.

The sporangium are collected in dome shaped groups of sorus (structures producing and containing spores) located solitary on leaflets and partially sunk in lamina.

Hymenophyllum dilatatum is easily distinguished from all other Hymenophyllum by the glabrous, entire margined fronds, winged stipe, and very broad pinnae segments.

== Range ==
=== Natural global range ===
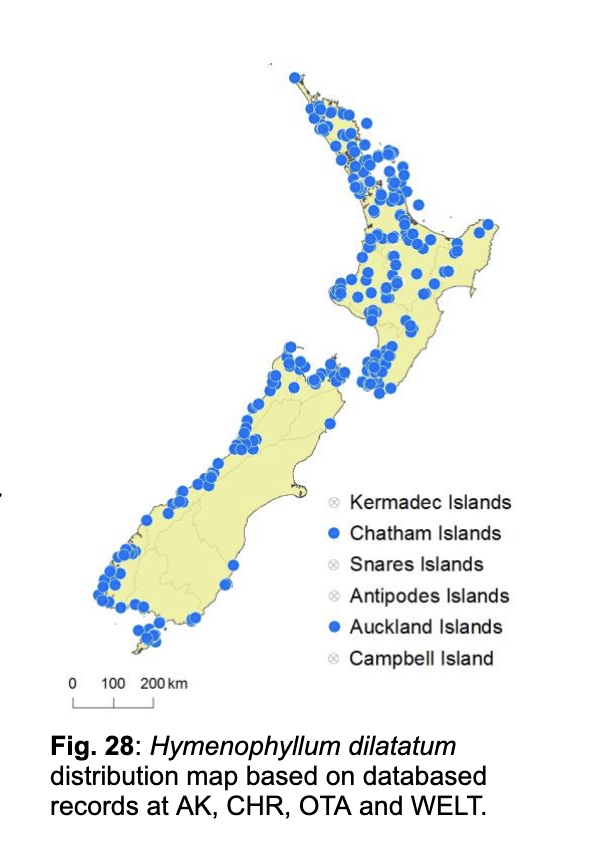
Distribution of Hymenophyllum dilatatum throughout New Zealand

Hymenophyllum dilatatum is endemic to New Zealand.

=== New Zealand range ===
Hymenophyllum dilatatum is widespread throughout the majority of the North Island, except for the east coast where it is largely absent.

On the South Island, H. dilatatum is mostly confined to the west coast of the main divide in coastal, lowland and montane areas where moisture content is higher, with a few very isolated populations around Dunedin, the Southland Region and The Catlins district. It is also located on Stewart Island, Chatham Islands and Auckland Islands.

Hymenophyllum dilatatum is not found in drier regions of the interior and eastern South Island, and while there have been some reports of observations around the Banks Peninsula, no voucher specimens have been found. The figure to the right illustrates the distribution of H. dilatatum throughout New Zealand based on verified specimens.

== Habitat ==
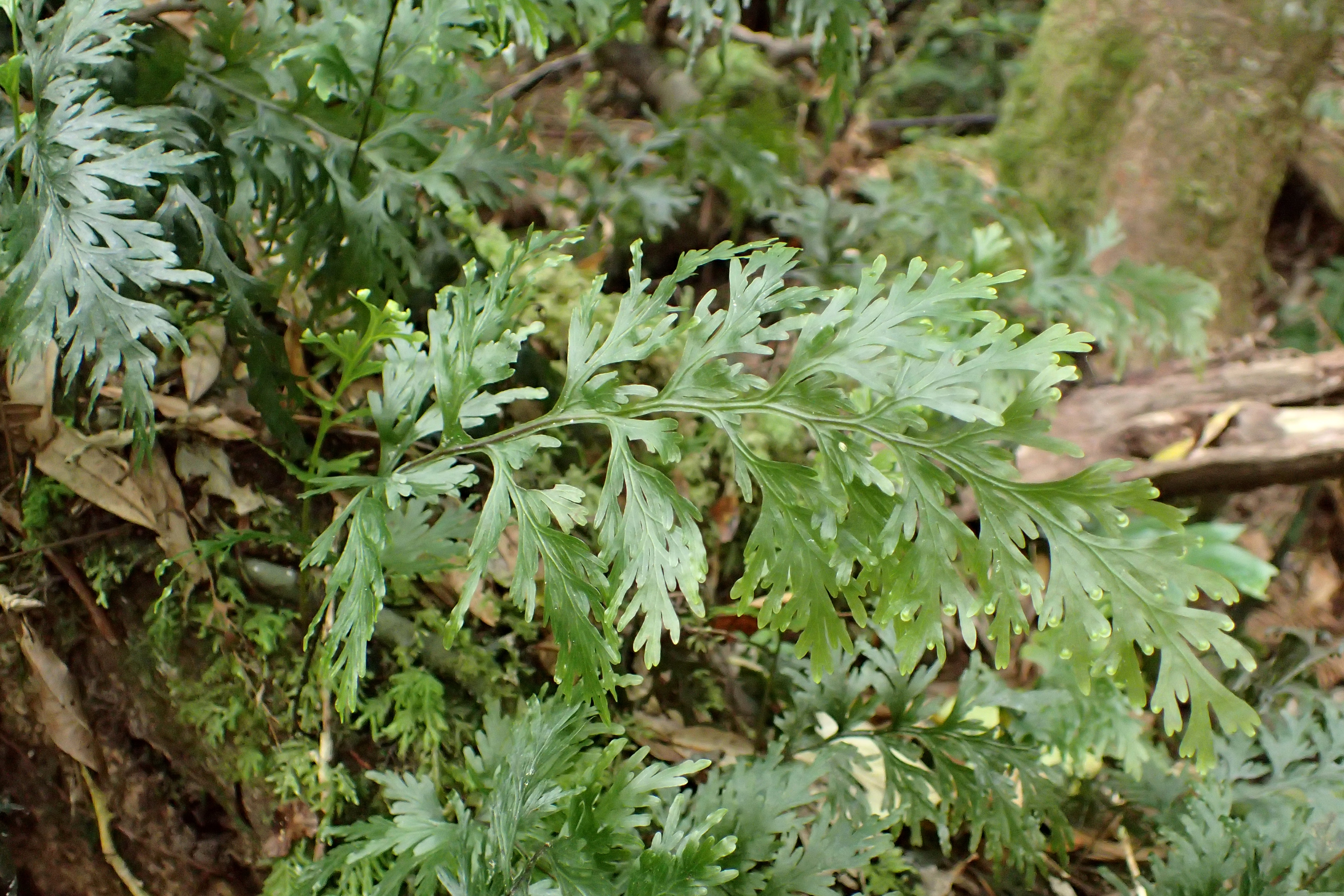
Hymenophyllum dilatatum as an epiphyte.

Hymenophyllum dilatatum is found in humid, temperate and rainforest environments. This species is usually found in kauri, podocarp, beech and broadleaved forests and found at altitude that ranges between sea level to over 1,060 metres (3,480 ft). Hymenophyllum dilatatum primarily grows as an epiphyte. A key advantage of an epiphyte is the increased supply of light; however, this species tends to be found in the shaded parts of forests and does not need increased light supply. The branches and leaves of trees serve to direct rainwater to the epiphyte, which is beneficial as H. dilatatum prefers moist conditions. It has also been found growing on fallen logs and occasionally on rock faces. Hymenophyllum dilatatum is very rarely found growing as a terrestrial fern, although when it is found to be terrestrial the typical habitat is rich humus soil, the same type of organic matter that forms and collects on tree trunks. Humus contains mycelia which aids in the establishment of epiphytes because it can utilise the fungal hyphae to assist in absorption of water and nutrients.

== Ecology ==
=== Life cycle and phenology ===
All mature fern fronds contain spores that are dispersed through several means and are the main source of population dispersal. Ferns use these spores to reproduce sexually or asexually.

==== Sexual reproduction ====
When a spore is released and germinates it enters the gametophyte stage, where sexual reproduction begins. A germinated spore becomes a prothalli, a small heart shaped plant, less than a centimeter long which has no real structure. They anchor where they land, connected by small hair-like strands, and produce sex organs on their underside. When the male structure (antheridium) bursts, it releases sperm that swim towards chemical attractants released by the female organs. Fertilisation occurs when the sperm cell enters the female structure (archegonium) and fuses with the egg cell. The fertilised egg develops into a new sporophyte fern plant.

==== Asexual reproduction ====
Gametophytes and sporophytes are both capable of vegetative reproduction and do not require moisture to successfully reproduce. Small plants called bulbil grow directly out of cells on the surface of the parent frond. After they detach they develop rhizomes and they connect with another surface. They are genetically identical to the parent fern.

==== Spore dispersal ====
Most fern spore dispersal, including H. dilatatum, is largely considered to be anemochorous (by wind). The distance a spore travels depends on the release height of the spore and the wind velocity. A vast majority of spores dispersed from short-stature terrestrial ferns is < 2 meters while the spore dispersal of taller ferns in closed forest conditions is up to 100 meters and can be up to several kilometers in open environments.

A study conducted by the University of Auckland analysed chiropterochory (bat) dispersal and the viability of spore dispersal by native New Zealand lesser short-tailed bats. Analyses were done on spores that survived bat gut passage and extracted from fecal pellets. Of 31 spores in 120 fecal pellets, 13 germinated. This resulted in 0.2 ± 0.3 as a mean abundance of viable spores per fecal pellet. The authors' conclusion was that New Zealand lesser short-tailed bats should be considered as a probable dispersal vector of New Zealand ferns. This study highlights the probability that other taxa such as birds, lizards, and introduced mammals should also be considered as potential dispersal vectors of H. dilatatum and other fern species.

=== Predators, parasites and diseases ===
Spores and fronds of Hymenophyllum are predated on by bats, birds, insects, and introduced mammals such as the Brushtail possum. Most ferns are susceptible to climate change because they prefer moist, humid environments and are easily damaged by changing forest conditions such as excess sunlight and drying winds.

== Conservation status ==
As of 2023, the New Zealand Threat Classification System used by the Department of Conservation assessed H. dilatatum as 'not threatened'.

== Cytology ==
Hymenophyllum dilatatum has n = 36.
