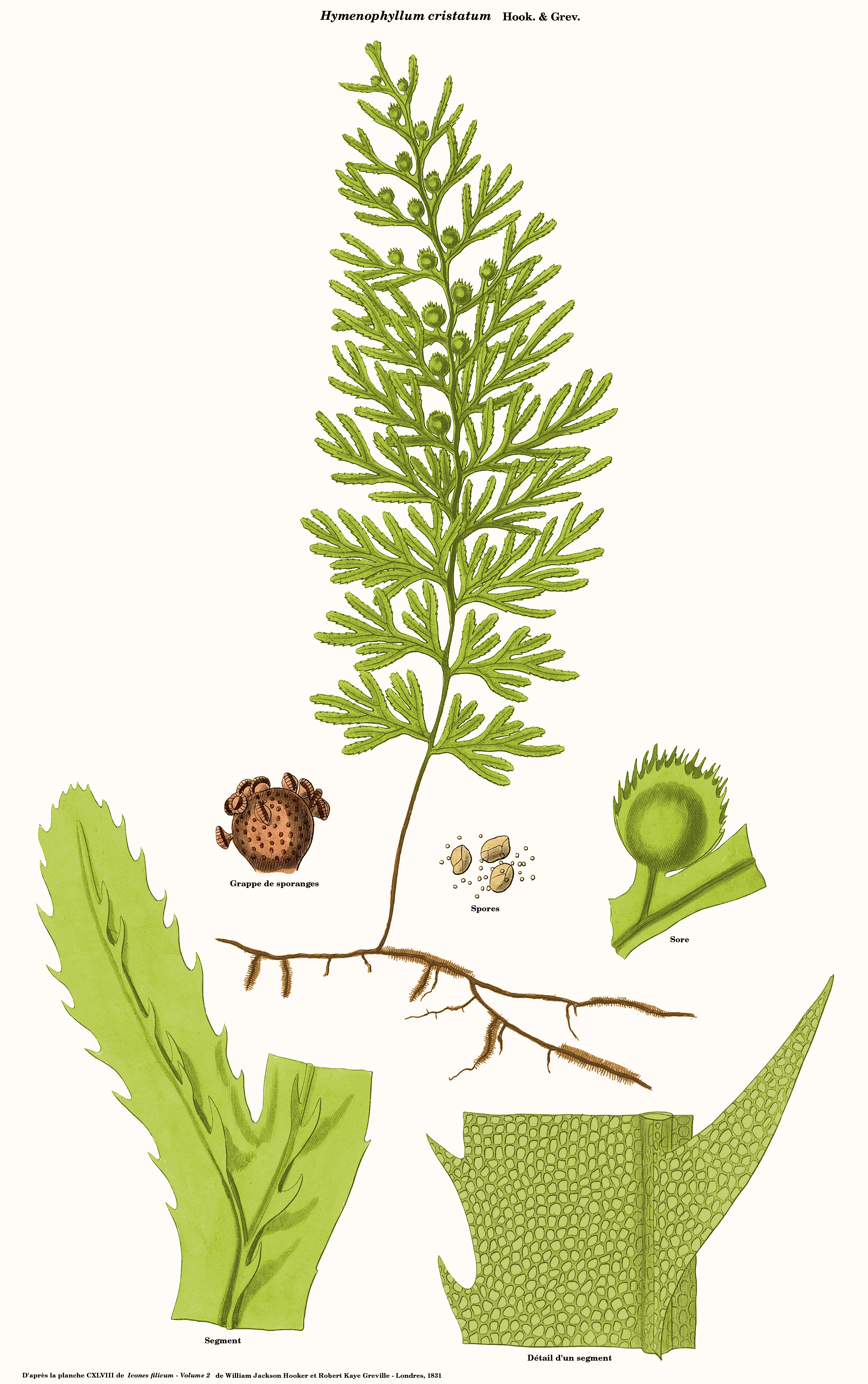

Conservation status
- Near Threatened (IUCN 3.1)

Scientific classification
- Kingdom: Plantae
- Clade: Tracheophytes
- Division: Polypodiophyta
- Class: Polypodiopsida
- Order: Hymenophyllales
- Family: Hymenophyllaceae
- Genus: Hymenophyllum
- Species: H. cristatum

Binomial name
- Hymenophyllum cristatum Hook. & Grev.

= Hymenophyllum cristatum =

Species of fern

Hymenophyllum cristatum is a species of fern in the family Hymenophyllaceae. It is endemic to Ecuador. Its natural habitats are subtropical or tropical moist montane forests and subtropical or tropical high-altitude grassland. It is threatened by habitat loss.
