= Hymenophyllum megistocarpum =

Conservation status
- Endangered (IUCN 3.1)

Scientific classification
- Kingdom: Plantae
- Clade: Tracheophytes
- Division: Polypodiophyta
- Class: Polypodiopsida
- Order: Hymenophyllales
- Family: Hymenophyllaceae
- Genus: Hymenophyllum
- Species: H. megistocarpum

Binomial name
- Hymenophyllum megistocarpum (Copel.) C.V.Morton

Species of fern

Hymenophyllum megistocarpum is a species of fern in the family Hymenophyllaceae. It is endemic to Ecuador, where it has not been seen since the original collection in 1935. It was found in wet forest habitat at an elevation of 3200 meters in the Andes. The area is undergoing habitat degradation.
