= Hymenophyllum axsmithii =

Hymenophyllum axsmithii Temporal range: Eocene (Ypresian) ~51–49 Ma

Scientific classification
- Kingdom: Plantae
- Clade: Tracheophytes
- Division: Polypodiophyta
- Class: Polypodiopsida
- Order: Hymenophyllales
- Family: Hymenophyllaceae
- Genus: Hymenophyllum
- Subgenus: †Hymenophyllum subg. Sphaerocionium
- Species: †H. axsmithii

Binomial name
- †Hymenophyllum axsmithii Pigg et al.

Fossil species of fern

Hymenophyllum axsmithii is an extinct species of fern in the family Hymenophyllaceae related to the modern hayscented ferns. The species is known from fossil fronds found in early Eocene sites of northern Washington state, United States, and central British Columbia, Canada. The species is included in Hymenophyllum subgenus Sphaerocionium, with a suggestion to be closest to a group of tropical species in the subgenus that are all specialized as sheltered epiphytes.

== Distribution ==
Hymenophyllum axsmithii fossils have been recovered from a single site in the Eocene Okanagan Highlands of Central British Columbia and northeast central Washington state. Both of the described specimens are from the Klondike Mountain Formation in Northern Ferry County, Washington, being recovered from the "Boot Hill" site B4131 in Republic, Washington.

The Republic flora was documented by Edward W. Berry in 1929 based on a compression fossils recovered from shale outcrops in the Republic area. When published, the Republic strata was misidentified as being an extension of the much younger Latah Formation, located southeast of Republic around the Spokane region, which was then considered to be of Late Miocene age. Roland W. Brown determined the Republic flora to be an older deposit and not part of the Latah formation in 1937. In a written communication c. 1958, Brown again revised the age still older, stating fossils found in the area of Mount Elizabeth, northeast of Republic indicated an Oligocene age. This age was followed by Herman Becker (1961) while discussing the Ruby Flora of Montana and Jack Wolfe (1965) in discussing the Fingerrock Wash Flora of Nevada. This age was also used by R.L. Parker and J. A. Calkins (1964) in their assessment of the Curlew Quadrangle of Ferry County.

Potassium-argon radiometric dating of samples taken near the Tom Thumb mine in 1966 resulted in a tentative age of 55 million years old. Further refinement of sample dating had yielded an approximately Early Eocene, Ypresian age, being radiometrically dated as 49.4 million years old. A 2003 report using dating of detrital zircon crystals with the tuffs of the Klondike Mountain Formation had been dated to 49.42 ± 0.54 million years ago, the youngest of the Okanagan Highlands sites, A 2021 report revised the possible oldest age to around 51.2 ± 0.1 million years ago based on isotopic data from zircon crystals.

== History and classification ==
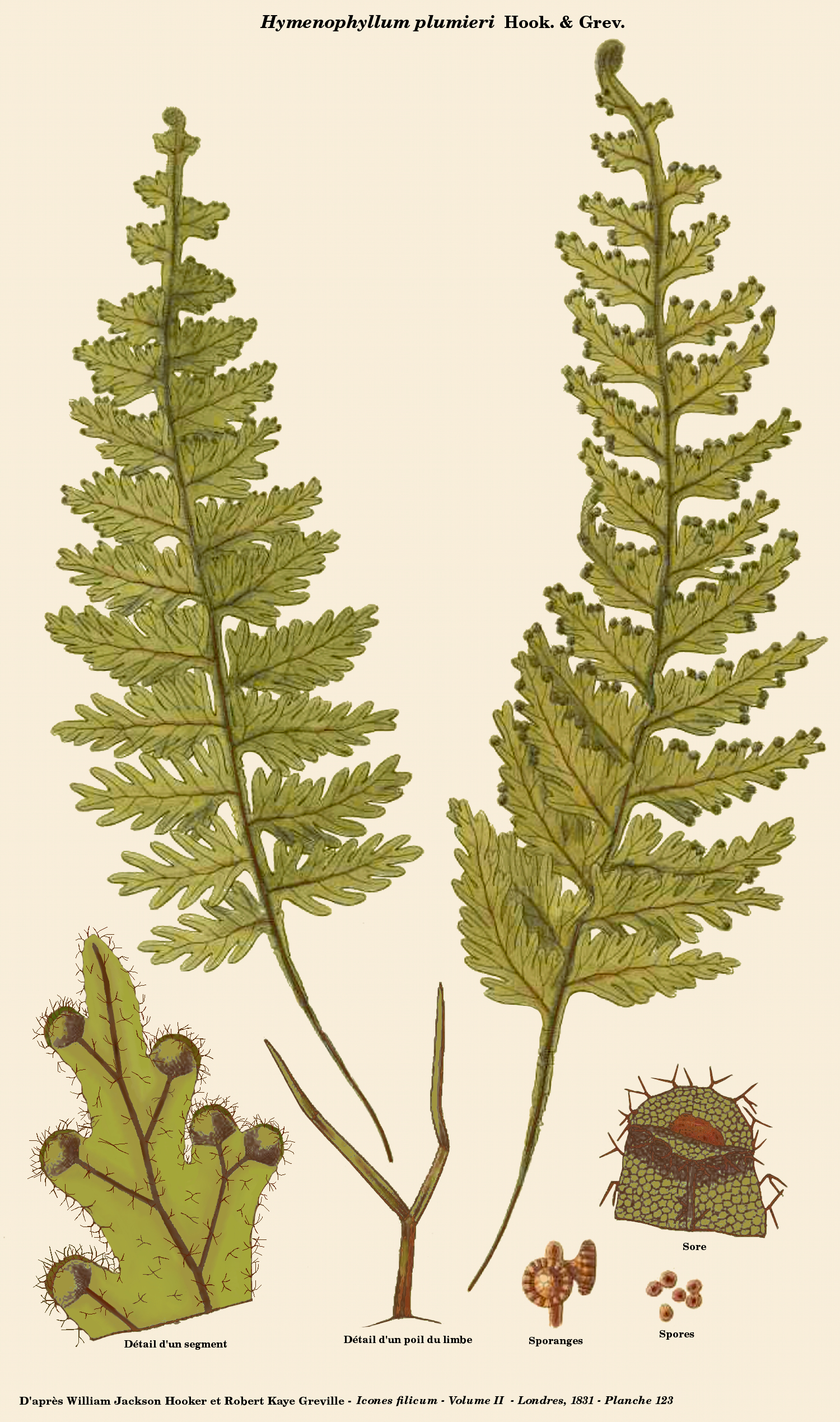
Illustration of Hymenophyllum plumieri

Fern fossils of the subclass Polypodiidae, commonly called leptosporangiate ferns, have been reported in the Eocene Okanagan Highlands since the late 1890s, and the first fertile fond material report came from Edward W. Berry (1926). More recently land ferns are regularly but briefly mentioned in overviews of the Eocene Okanagan Highlands, no detailed descriptive work as happened. The Republic fossils were studied subsequently by a group of paleobotanists led by Kathleen B. Pigg, with the 2021 type description of the species being published in the International Journal of Plant Sciences. They designated two type specimens at the time of publication, the holotype "SR 05-15-13" which was accessioned in the Stonerose Interpretive Center paleobotanical collection, while the paratype "UWBM 77726a" was part of the Burke Museum of Natural History and Culture paleontology collection. The holotype and paratype were collected from the Klondike Mountain Formations "Boot Hill" site "B4131". The team coined the specific epithet axsmithii as a patronym honoring Brian J. Axsmith for his many works in paleobotany, including the description of the oldest member of Hymenophyllaceae the Triassic Hopetedia praetermissa.

The group placed the new species into the modern genus Hymenophyllum based on the thin fronds plus placement and shape of the preserved sori indusia. The placement of the fossil sori are along the pinnae edges, and each of the sori are enclosed by a bivalved globose indusia, occasionally surrounded by trichomes. The fronds are distinctly thin as in the modern species, with similar leaf shapes and dissection. The genus as of 2023 included approximately 430 species which are mostly found in the tropics globally, but having a Cosmopolitan distribution. Of the species in Hymenophyllum, H. axsmithii is most similar in its known morphology to a group of Hymenophyllum subg. Sphaerocionium species found in the neotropics. The species, H. dependens, H. lobatoalatum, H. plumieri, H. plumosum, H. pyramidatum, and H. verecundum are native to central and South America. Hymenophyllum axsmithii has been noted one of the oldest unequivocal fossil species of Hymenophyllum, and the only firm record from the Cenozoic.

== Description ==
Dennstaedtia christophelii is known only from leaf frond fossils, and as such the rhizome anatomy and spore morphology are unknown. The two described fronds are both incomplete, with the fertile frond section measuring 4.0 cm × 2.8 cm (1.6 in × 1.1 in) with 6 pairs of pinnae, and the vegetative specimen being approximately 3.0 cm (1.2 in) long. The rachis has a slightly ribbed appearance and there are narrow laminae wings along the plane of pinnae running up both sides of it.

The petiole is missing on both specimens, while the rachis which is 1.3 mm (3/50 in) at its widest and terminating in the uppermost crosier. The sterile frond fragment is very similar to the fertile fragment in pinnae shape and vascularization. The leaves are weakly bipinnate, with the laminae modified into separated pinnules, which in turn are weakly lobed. The pinnules are oriented in an alternating pattern along the rachis, and fertile pinnules alternate with inertial ones. The thin pinnules have bifurcating veins running from the rachis at the lamina base apically. The veins fork up to three times with each veinlet diverging into a separate lobe and all terminating at lope tips. The basal most fork in the laminae arches to run parallel to the rachis, while all branches fork off basal sides of the main veins. The amount of vein forking in each pinnules decreases the closer the pinnule is to the apex. Scattered trichomes are found along the edges of the pinnule, often associated with sori.

Sori are located in funnel shaped receptacles which are flush with the pinnae surface. The sori are surrounded by globose bivalved indusia of about 1 mm × 1 mm (0.039 in × 0.039 in) located along the apical and basal margins of fertile pinnules. Where preserved the sori are comprised of numerous sporangia. Within each sporangia, the annulus is between 10 and 12 cells wide and are interpreted to have been sessile, typical for the family. Examination of the fossils via an environmental scanning electron microscope showed that some of the sporangia enclosed between 7 and 10 dark ovoid structures. While no details of the structures was discernable, the location suggests them to be spore casts.

== Paleoecology ==
One Hymenophyllum is native to the greater Washington and British Columbia areas, H. wrightii which is confined to the coast of the Pacific Northwest Coast ecoregion, and placed in H. subg. Mecodium. Pigg et al noted the probable affinity to a group of H. subg. Sphaerocionium species. These species are all restricted to humid mountain locations in the neotropics with epiphyte substrate specialization for protected areas such as rock ledges or under tree branches. Pigg et al noted that despite the modern relatives epiphytic nature, the possibility Hymenophyllum axsmithii was an epiphyte or not will depend on more fossils being found and described; in particular the rhizome and root structure will be key to determining where in the Republic paleoforest it lived.

== Paleoenvironment ==
The Republic sites are part of a larger fossil site system collectively known as the Eocene Okanagan Highlands. The highlands, including the Early Eocene formations between Driftwood Canyon at the north and Republic at the south, have been described as one of the "Great Canadian Lagerstätten" based on the diversity, quality and unique nature of the paleofloral and paleofaunal biotas that are preserved. The highlands temperate biome preserved across a large transect of lakes recorded many of the earliest appearances of modern genera, while also documenting the last stands of ancient lines. The warm temperate highland floras in association with downfaulted lacustrine basins and active volcanism are noted to have no exact modern equivalents. This is due to the more seasonally equitable conditions of the Early Eocene, resulting in much lower seasonal temperature shifts. However, the highlands have been compared to the upland ecological islands of the Virunga Mountains within the African rift valleys Albertine Rift.

The Klondike Mountain Formation represents an upland lake system that was surrounded by a warm temperate ecosystem with nearby volcanism dating from during and just after the early Eocene climatic optimum. The Okanagan Highlands likely had a mesic upper microthermal to lower mesothermal climate, in which winter temperatures rarely dropped low enough for snow, and which were seasonably equitable. The paleoforest surrounding the lakes have been described as precursors to the modern temperate broadleaf and mixed forests of Eastern North America and Eastern Asia. Based on the fossil biotas the lakes were higher and cooler then the coeval coastal forests preserved in the Puget Group and Chuckanut Formation of Western Washington, which are described as lowland tropical forest ecosystems. Estimates of the paleoelevation range between 0.7 and 1.2 km (0.43 and 0.75 mi) higher than the coastal forests. This is consistent with the paleoelevation estimates for the lake systems, which range between 1.1 and 2.9 km (1,100 and 2,900 m), which is similar to the modern elevation 0.8 km (0.50 mi), but higher.

Estimates of the mean annual temperature have been derived from climate leaf analysis multivariate program (CLAMP) analysis and leaf margin analysis (LMA) of the Republic paleoflora. The CLAMP results after multiple linear regressions gave a mean annual temperature of approximately 8.0 °C (46.4 °F), with the LMA giving 9.2 ± 2.0 °C (48.6 ± 3.6 °F). A bioclimatic-based estimate based on modern relatives of the taxa found at Republic suggested mean annual temperatures around 13.5 ± 2.2 °C (56.3 ± 4.0 °F). This is lower than the mean annual temperature estimates given for the coastal Puget Group, which is estimated to have been between 15 and 18.6 °C (59.0 and 65.5 °F). The bioclimatic analysis for Republic suggests a mean annual precipitation amount of 115 ± 39 cm (45 ± 15 in).
