= Hymenophyllum nanum =

Conservation status
- Endangered (IUCN 3.1)

Scientific classification
- Kingdom: Plantae
- Clade: Tracheophytes
- Division: Polypodiophyta
- Class: Polypodiopsida
- Order: Hymenophyllales
- Family: Hymenophyllaceae
- Genus: Hymenophyllum
- Species: H. nanum

Binomial name
- Hymenophyllum nanum Sodiro

Species of fern

Hymenophyllum nanum is a species of fern in the family Hymenophyllaceae. It is endemic to Ecuador, where it is known from two old collections in Pichincha Province. Its natural habitat is the forest of the lower Andes. It is threatened by habitat loss.
