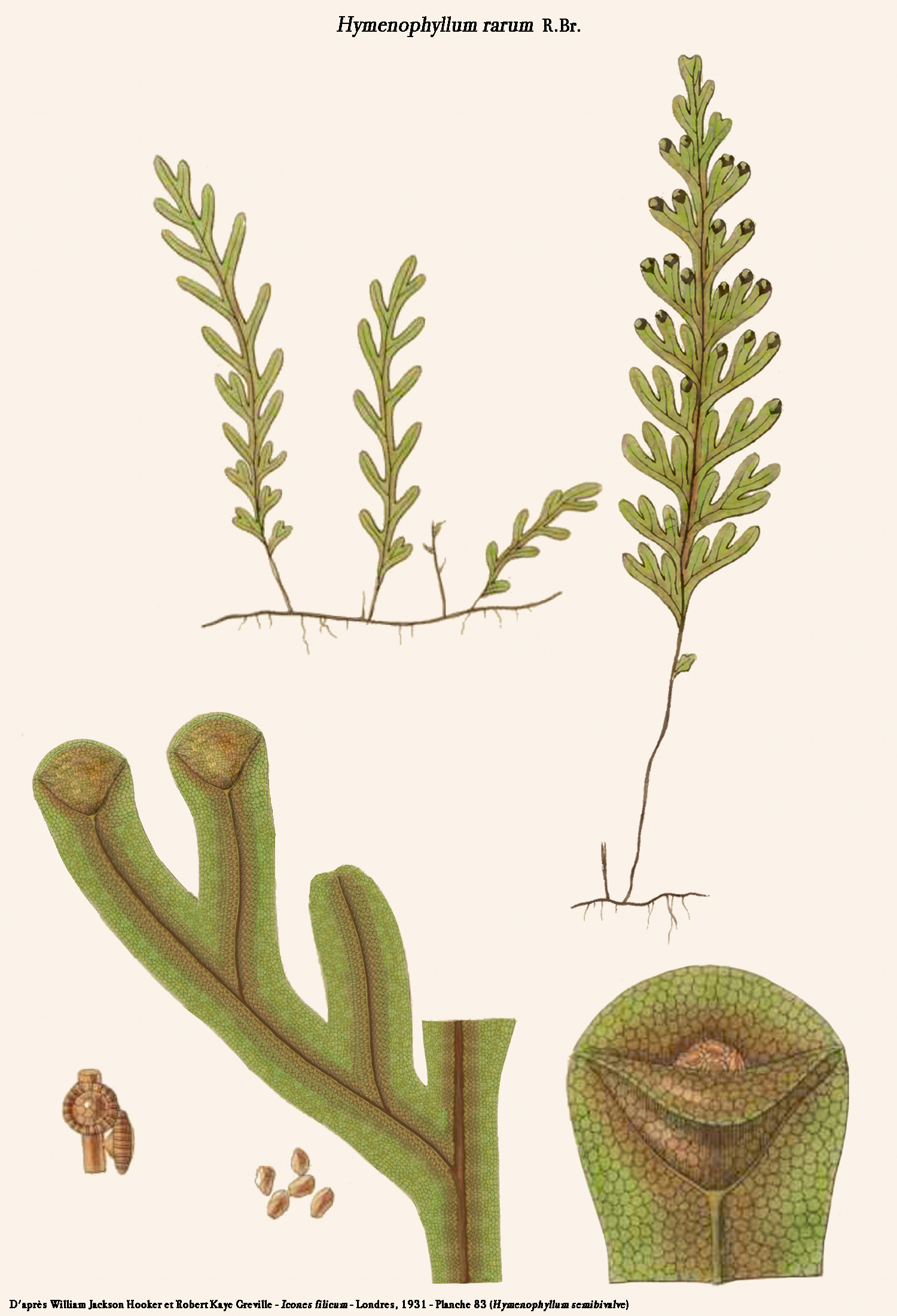

Scientific classification
- Kingdom: Plantae
- Clade: Tracheophytes
- Division: Polypodiophyta
- Class: Polypodiopsida
- Order: Hymenophyllales
- Family: Hymenophyllaceae
- Genus: Hymenophyllum
- Species: H. rarum

Binomial name
- Hymenophyllum rarum R.Br.

Synonyms
- Mecodium flabellatum

= Hymenophyllum rarum =

Species of plant

Hymenophyllum rarum (Hymen-O-FIL-lum rare-um), the narrow filmy-fern, is a species of fern from the family Hymenophyllaceae. This thin-leaved fern is commonly found in New Zealand and Tasmania, growing in patches on rocks and is epiphytic on trees and tree ferns, growing in moist gullies or rainforests. A rather drought tolerant species often found at exposed sites ranging from coastal to montane areas. Forming extensive, interwoven and creeping patches with its thin long (creeping) rhizomes sparsely covered in red-brown hairs, easily recognised by its membranous grey-green fronds, the smooth margins of the pinnae, ultimate segments and indusia; and by the sunken sori in the uppermost segments of the uppermost pinnae. The species can be found throughout Tasmanian rainforests as well as occurring in New South Wales, Victoria and New Zealand on the North and South Islands as well as, Stewart, Chatham and Auckland Islands.

== Etymology ==
Hymenophyllum: Membranous leaf, from the Greek hymen and phullon.

rarum: thin-leaved; from the Latin rarus.

== Description ==
The narrow filmy-fern is distinct by its long thin, creeping rhizome, membranous fronds, that grow in moist areas. Fronds are pale grey-green, and the entire plant is glabrous (devoid of hairs). Fronds are pendant and up to 15 cm long; stipe to 20–70 mm long, very thin, black; rachis winged in the uppermost section of the frond; lamina 1-pinnate 1–2-pinnatifid, pale green, and up to 100 mm in length and 10–25 mm wide, with no toothed margins. Solitary sori borne at apex of segments, and sunken at the base but not tubular; a whorl or rosette of bracts surrounding the inflorescence or at the base of an umbel, shaped like a rhomboid, apex rounded or obtusely angled; receptacle slender, included. Indusium completely covers the sporangia, and splits apart when spores are ready to be dispersed by wind.

== Habitat and distribution ==
The narrow filmy-fern is found in rainforests, forming patches on rocks and is often epiphytic on trees and tree ferns in moist gullies. It is highly dispersed throughout the tropical and south temperate zones occurring across Australia in New South Wales and Victoria. This species can also be found in Tasmania and on the Bass Strait Islands, While being highly dispersed throughout New Zealand, occurring on North and South Islands as well as, Stewart, Chatham and Auckland Islands. Occurring in coastal to montane habitats, this species is common in rainforests, scrub, shaded cliff faces or amongst boulders and damp gullies. Often growing amongst other filmy-ferns, this species closely resembles is relatives H. cupressiforme and H. peltatum. As with H. peltatum, the pinnae are often divided on only one side. Unlike both these species, however, the pinnae of H. rarum do not have serrated margins.

== Taxonomy and evolution ==
The family Hymenophyllaceae is a largely successful family under the division of Pteridophytes (ferns and fern allies). This family is commonly referred to as the filmy fern family, with around 670–700 named species, only 131 are accepted. Divided into two genera, Hymenophyllum and Trichomanes. The Genera are separated based on the sorus and gametophyte structures, particularly the indsium structure (membrane covering sorus) and the receptacle.

The Australian plants of H. rarum differ from their New Zealand counterparts with widely spaced pinnae rather than imbricating pale green pinnae. The Sori of the Australian H. rarum are not wholly sunken within the pinnae nor are they bound to the uppermost segments of the uppermost pinnae.

Members from the genus Hymenophyllum are all small, thin and delicate. They are either epiphytic plants or rock plants, forming dense patches or mats along rainforest floors. Members of this family most commonly occur in moist habitats with few members being able to withstand dryer conditions, in which they are able to later 'revive' themselves when moisture becomes readily available.
