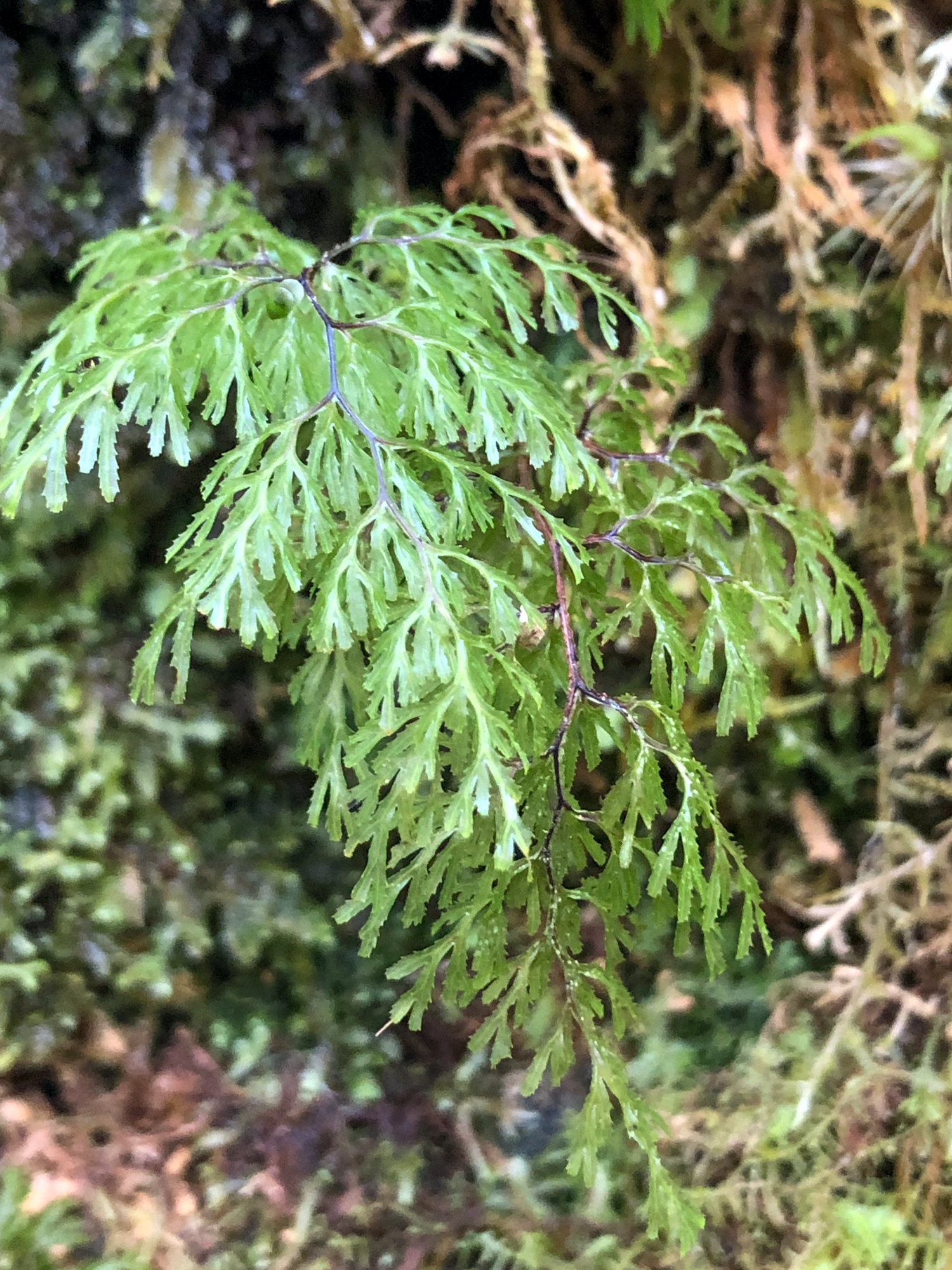
- Hymenophyllum multifidum in Te Papa-Kura-o-Taranaki

Conservation status
- Not Threatened (NZ TCS)

Scientific classification
- Kingdom: Plantae
- Clade: Tracheophytes
- Division: Polypodiophyta
- Class: Polypodiopsida
- Order: Hymenophyllales
- Family: Hymenophyllaceae
- Genus: Hymenophyllum
- Species: H. multifidum

Binomial name
- Hymenophyllum multifidum (G.Forst.) Sw.

= Hymenophyllum multifidum =

Species of fern

Hymenophyllum multifidum, or the much-divided filmy fern, is a species of fern, endemic to New Zealand. It has one of the largest altitudinal ranges of any fern in New Zealand.

== Description ==
This fern is known for its heavily marginated pinnae, making it look like it is divided into many sections. It often forms colonies with many individuals. The prominent soris, bent at right angles to the fronds, can be used to distinguish it from other ferns, among some other features.

== Range and habitat ==
This species grows on all of the major islands of New Zealand, as well as in the sub-Antarctic islands. It grows on the forest floor, but can also grow as an epiphyte on rock faces.

It can also be found on Lord Howe Island, Vanuatu, Fiji, and Samoa. Some authorities maintain that it is not endemic to New Zealand.

== Etymology ==
Multifidum means 'much divided', as findere means 'to divide'.
