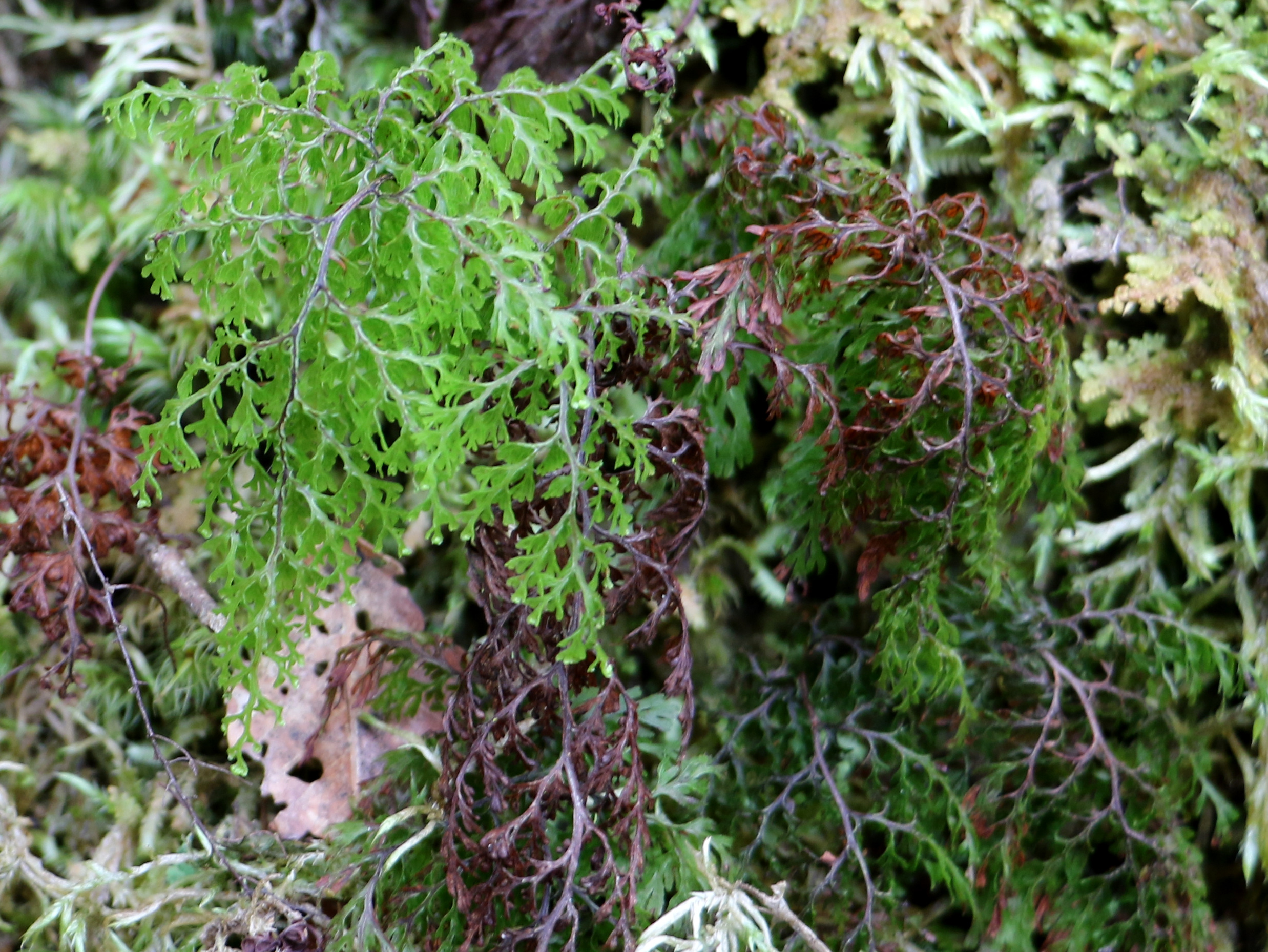
- Barrington Tops National Park, Australia

Scientific classification
- Kingdom: Plantae
- Clade: Tracheophytes
- Division: Polypodiophyta
- Class: Polypodiopsida
- Order: Hymenophyllales
- Family: Hymenophyllaceae
- Genus: Hymenophyllum
- Species: H. bivalve

Binomial name
- Hymenophyllum bivalve (G.Forst.) Sw.

Synonyms
- Meringium bivalve (G.Forst.) Copel.; Hymenophyllum spathulatum Colenso

= Hymenophyllum bivalve =

Species of fern

Hymenophyllum bivalve is a species of filmy fern. It is found in moist, sheltered areas in or near mountain rainforests in Australia and New Zealand. The habitat is on tree trunks, rocks and fallen logs.
