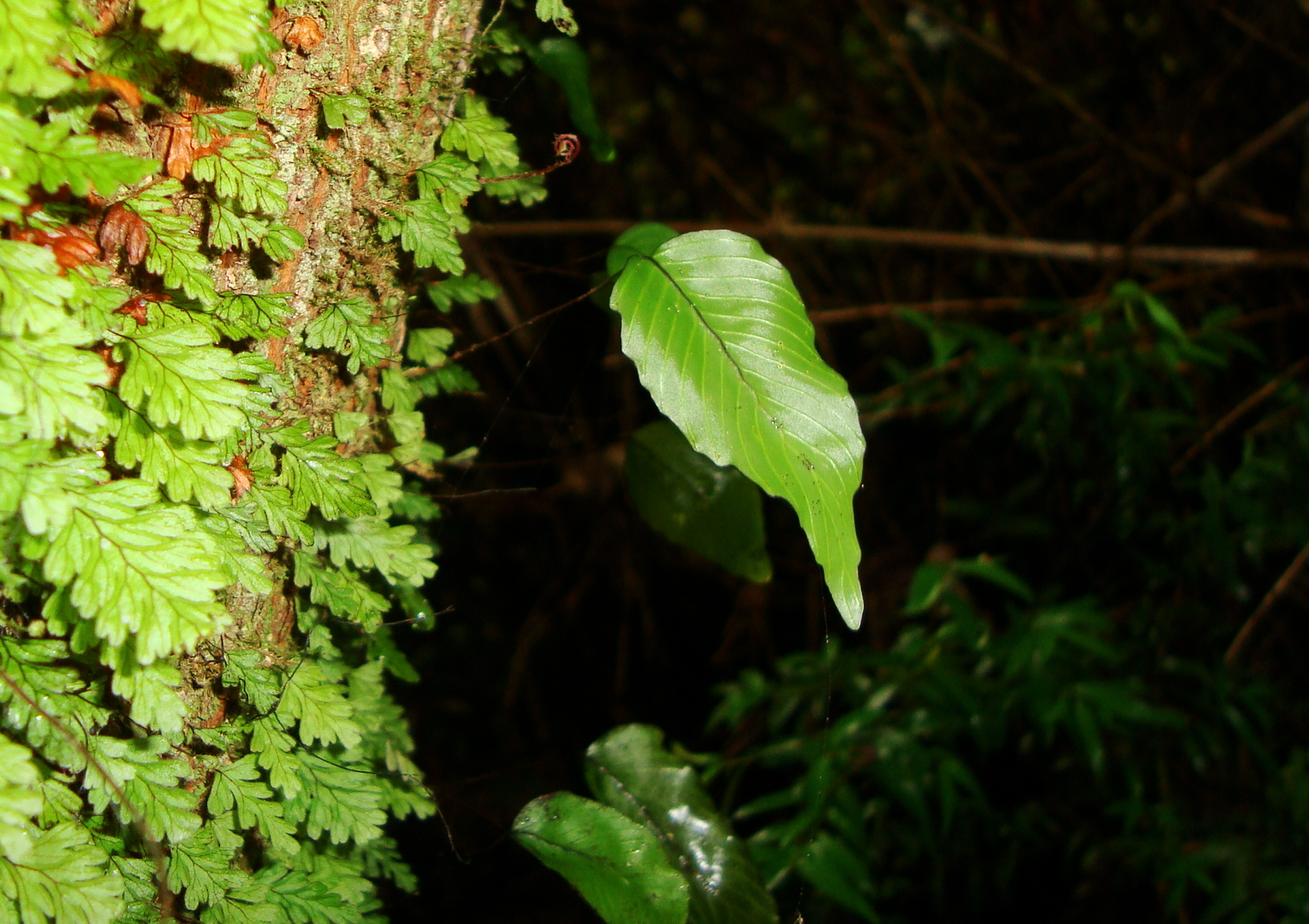
- Hymenophyllum cruentum (center)

Scientific classification
- Kingdom: Plantae
- Clade: Tracheophytes
- Division: Polypodiophyta
- Class: Polypodiopsida
- Order: Hymenophyllales
- Family: Hymenophyllaceae
- Genus: Hymenophyllum
- Species: H. cruentum

Binomial name
- Hymenophyllum cruentum (Cav.) C. Presl

= Hymenophyllum cruentum =

Species of plant

Hymenophyllum cruentum is a species of epiphytic fern. It is native to Chile and Argentina. In Chile, it is distributed between the Maule and Magallanes regions and also in the Juan Fernández Islands.
