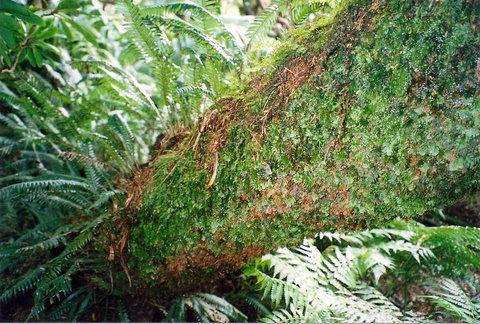
- Hymenophyllum moorei (small ferns) on a log at Mount Gower, Lord Howe Island

Scientific classification
- Kingdom: Plantae
- Clade: Tracheophytes
- Division: Polypodiophyta
- Class: Polypodiopsida
- Order: Hymenophyllales
- Family: Hymenophyllaceae
- Genus: Hymenophyllum
- Species: H. moorei

Binomial name
- Hymenophyllum moorei Baker

Synonyms
- Hymenophyllum pumilum

= Hymenophyllum moorei =

Species of fern

Hymenophyllum moorei is a rare species of filmy fern in the family Hymenophyllaceae. It is endemic to the high cloud forest at Mount Gower and Mount Lidgbird at Lord Howe Island. A small epiphytic fern found usually on tree trunks and fallen logs.
