= Hymenophyllum sodiroi =

Conservation status
- Data Deficient (IUCN 3.1)

Scientific classification
- Kingdom: Plantae
- Clade: Tracheophytes
- Division: Polypodiophyta
- Class: Polypodiopsida
- Order: Hymenophyllales
- Family: Hymenophyllaceae
- Genus: Hymenophyllum
- Species: H. sodiroi

Binomial name
- Hymenophyllum sodiroi C.Chr.

Species of fern

Hymenophyllum sodiroi is a species of fern in the family Hymenophyllaceae. It is endemic to Ecuador. Its natural habitat is subtropical or tropical moist montane forests. It is threatened by habitat loss.
