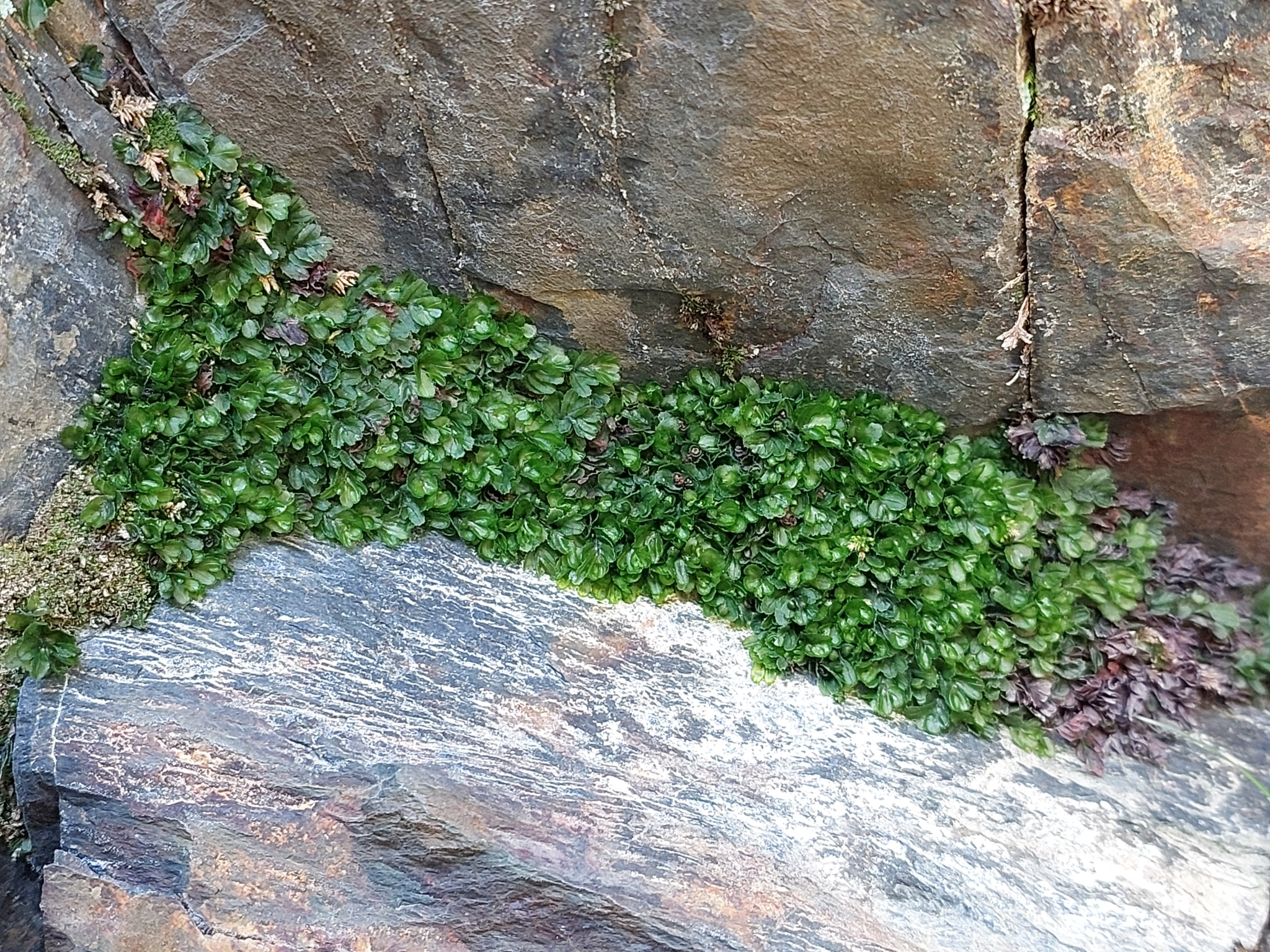
- On South Georgia

Scientific classification
- Kingdom: Plantae
- Clade: Tracheophytes
- Division: Polypodiophyta
- Class: Polypodiopsida
- Order: Hymenophyllales
- Family: Hymenophyllaceae
- Genus: Hymenophyllum
- Species: H. falklandicum

Binomial name
- Hymenophyllum falklandicum Baker

Synonyms
- Hymenophyllum caespitosum Christ; Hymenophyllum glebarium Christ

= Hymenophyllum falklandicum =

Species of plant

Hymenophyllum falklandicum, the Falklands filmy fern, is a plant in the fern family Hymenophyllaceae. It is native to Patagonia and some subantarctic islands.

== Description ==
Hymenophyllum falklandicum grows as a very small fern, up to 3 centimetres (1 in) tall. The fronds are dark green, glabrous and serrated. Fronds measure up 2 cm (1 in) long and are spaced 2–4 cm (1–2 in) apart. Spores are contained in brown or black capsules.

== Distribution and habitat ==
Hymenophyllum falklandicum is native to Patagonia, the Juan Fernández Islands, the Falkland Islands, South Georgia and Macquarie Island. It is found widely, growing in rocky crevices or overhangs at altitudes up to 350 m (1,100 ft), rarely to 500 m (1,600 ft).
