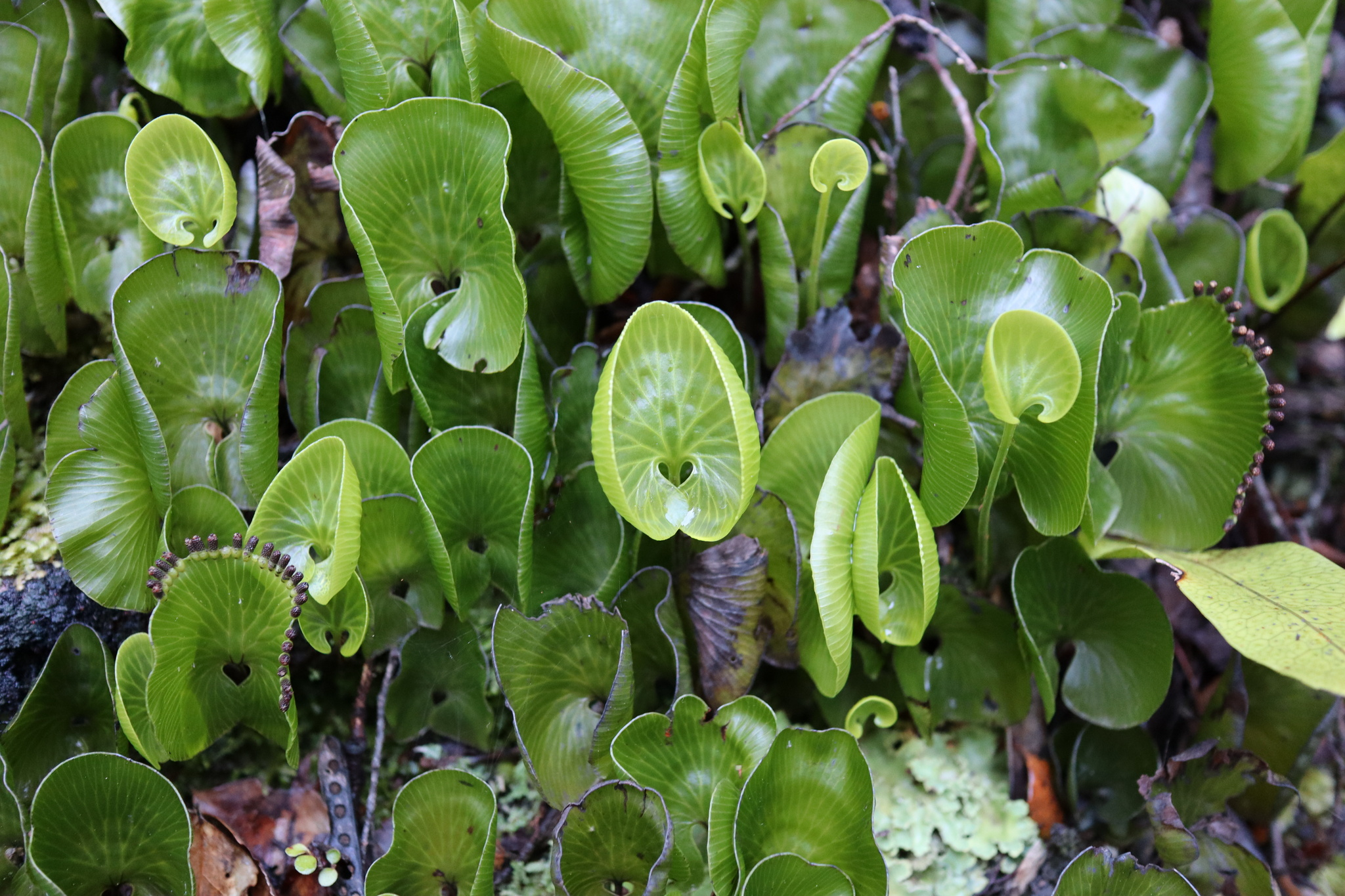

Scientific classification
- Kingdom: Plantae
- Clade: Tracheophytes
- Division: Polypodiophyta
- Class: Polypodiopsida
- Order: Hymenophyllales
- Family: Hymenophyllaceae
- Genus: Hymenophyllum
- Species: H. nephrophyllum

Binomial name
- Hymenophyllum nephrophyllum Ebihara & K.Iwats.

Synonyms
- Trichomanes reniforme G.Forst.; Cardiomanes reniforme (G.Forst.) C.Presl

= Hymenophyllum nephrophyllum =

Species of fern

Hymenophyllum nephrophyllum, commonly known as the kidney fern, is a filmy fern species native to New Zealand. It commonly grows on the forest floor of open native bush. Individual kidney-shaped fronds stand about 5–10 cm tall. In hot weather they shrivel up to conserve moisture, but open up again when the wet returns. This species has very thin fronds which are only four to six cells in thickness. In the Māori language they are also called raurenga.

A specific example of occurrence of H. nephrophyllum is within forested areas of Westland, New Zealand, where it occurs with other fern species including crown fern, Blechnum discolor.

== Description ==
Hymenophyllum nephrophyllum is a fern distinctive for its undivided, kidney-shaped fronds, which give the plant its English common name, the kidney fern. The fronds, or laminae, are 3–10 cm by 4–13 cm and are a shiny, translucent green. The translucent nature of the kidney fern's fronds is due to them being very thin, only one cell thick as a sporeling, which increases to 3–4 cells when the plant reaches maturity. The fronds are supported on brittle stipes 5–25 cm in length. Mature plants have a row of sori (a collection of sporangia) crowning the upper margin of their frond, where they resemble a row of small brown pegs. A feature Hymenophyllum nephrophyllum shares with some other filmy ferns is the ability to curl up tightly during dry conditions in order to reduce moisture loss; this gives kidney fern one of its Māori common names, kopakopa (to wrap or clasp). After rain or when conditions improve, it unfurls and recovers.

== Taxonomy ==
The scientific names Trichomanes reniforme and Cardiomanes reniforme have previously been used for kidney fern. However, phylogenetic analyses of DNA sequences have shown kidney fern to be part of Hymenophyllum, and a name in that genus is used in the Flora of New Zealand and the Checklist of Ferns and Lycophytes of the World.

The species epithet for Hymenophyllum nephrophyllum is a reference to its fronds: from the Greek nephro- (kidney-shaped) and -phyllus (leaved). The reniforme epithet of the two synonyms Trichomanes reniforme and Cardiomanes reniforme is also in reference to the frond shape. The genus name Cardiomanes also arises from reference to the distinctive frond shape: Greek kardia (heart) and manos (thin).

== Distribution ==
=== Natural global range ===
Hymenophyllum nephrophyllum is endemic to New Zealand, meaning it is native to and found only in New Zealand. Other members of the Hymenophyllum genus can be found throughout the world as well as New Zealand.

=== New Zealand range ===
Hymenophyllum nephrophyllum is found throughout the North Island and in northern, western, and southern regions of the South Island, as well as Stewart Island and the Chatham Islands. It is not recorded from the eastern side of the South Island.

=== Habitat preferences ===
Hymenophyllum nephrophyllum is found in a wide range of habitats from wet forests to lava fields; however, it is most frequently found in moister forests up to an altitude of 780 meters. This preference for moist forest is likely the cause of its absence from most of the eastern side of the South Island; however, its ability to curl up is what gives it a tolerance to a wide range of habitats. Hymenophyllum nephrophyllum inhabits the forest floor where it will often form extensive mats, as well as on banks, rocks, fallen trees and as an epiphyte on lower trunks and branches.

== Life cycle and phenology ==
Like all ferns, Hymenophyllum neprhophyllum reproduces and disperses offspring through spores. It has tubular indusia (spore protecting structures) that stick out from the edge of the fronds. Stalks carrying sori, with sporangia that develop sequentially from base to apex, grow out of the indusia until at plant maturity they emerge and release their spores. Hymenophyllum nephrophyllum also spreads by vegetative reproduction, putting out far-creeping rhizomes (an underground stem that puts out adventitious shoots and roots) that form the distinctive mats of fronds on the forest floor. Little else grows in mats of Hymenophyllum nephrophyllum as the rhizomes produce a compound inhibiting the root growth of seedlings of other species.

== Diet and foraging ==
The lifecycle of the fern could not occur without damp soil as its spores prefer a moist environment. As Hymenophyllum neprhophyllum mainly inhabits moist forests, it requires a relatively damp soil; however, the kidney fern is poikilohydric and has adapted to a variety of habitats. This has given it the ability to store water in drier weather, which it does by shrivelling up and expanding again once rain returns.

== Predators, parasites, and diseases ==
The caterpillars from the moth family Tortricidae are known to feed on Hymenophyllum nephrophyllum. The caterpillars of these filmy-fern leaf-tyer moths can be found in silk tubes attached to the plants fronds, which may have been woven together or bent inwards to protect the caterpillar from predation. Due to the specific climatic and soil conditions that ferns require human based threats to their survival include habitat loss through forest clearance and introduced invasive plants.

== Other information ==
Hymenophyllum nephrophyllum has several traditional uses to Māori including being a treatment for bowel disorders (however this is disputed), a perfume plant and also worn during mourning. Other Māori common names for Hymenophyllum nephrophyllum are konehu and raurenga.
