= Pachyloma =

Scientific classification
- Kingdom: Plantae
- Clade: Tracheophytes
- Clade: Angiosperms
- Clade: Eudicots
- Clade: Rosids
- Order: Myrtales
- Family: Melastomataceae
- Genus: Pachyloma; DC. (1828)

Species
- Pachyloma coriaceum DC.; Pachyloma huberioides Triana; Pachyloma pusillum Wurdack; Pachyloma setosum Wurdack

Synonyms
- Urodesmium Naudin (1851)

Genus of plants

Pachyloma is a genus of plants in the family Melastomataceae. It includes four species native to northern South America, from Colombia to Venezuela, Guyana, and northern Brazil.

- Pachyloma coriaceum DC. – Colombia, northern Brazil, and Guyana
- Pachyloma huberioides Triana – eastern Colombia, Venezuela, and northern Brazil
- Pachyloma pusillum Wurdack – Colombia (Guainía) and Venezuela (Amazonas)
- Pachyloma setosum Wurdack – Colombia (Guainía) and Venezuela (Amazonas)
