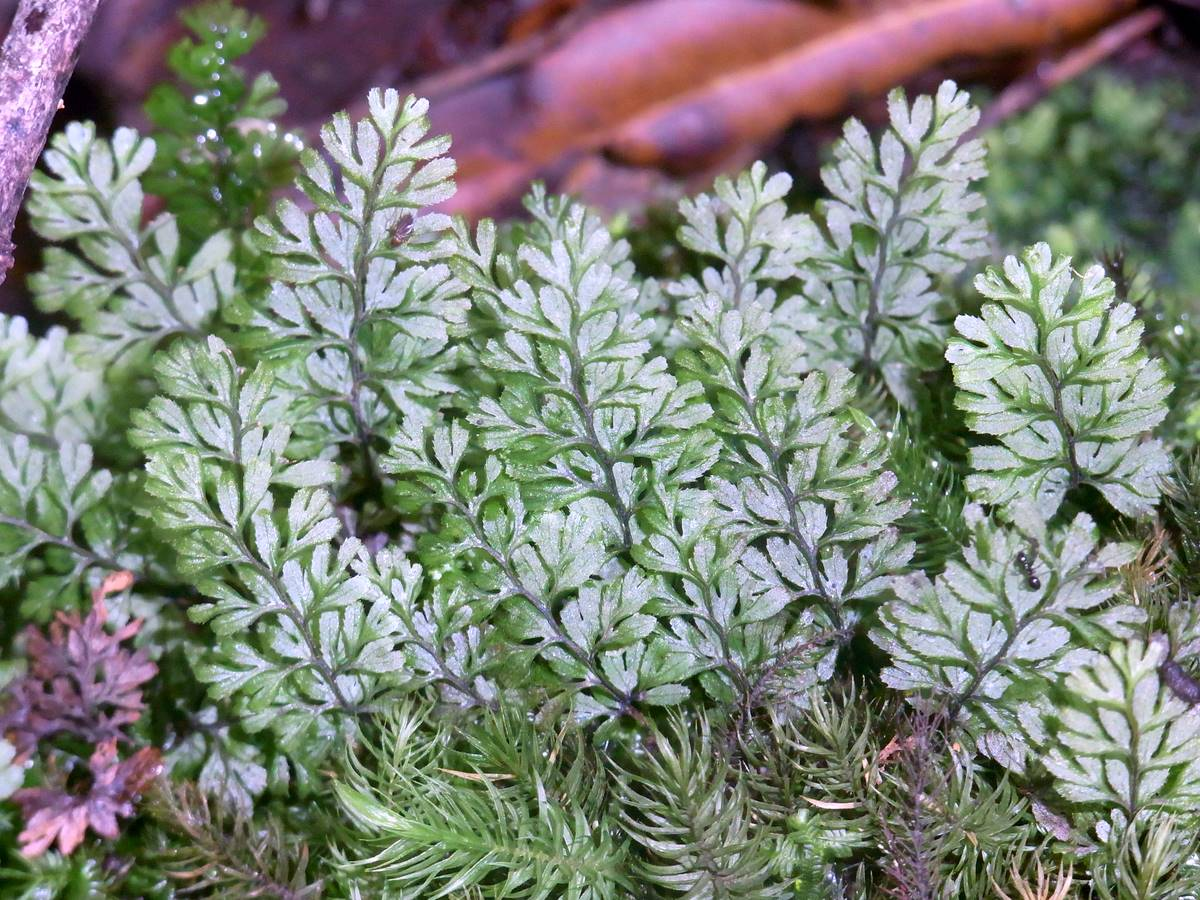
- Filmy ferns Chatswood West, Australia

Scientific classification
- Kingdom: Plantae
- Clade: Tracheophytes
- Division: Polypodiophyta
- Class: Polypodiopsida
- Order: Hymenophyllales
- Family: Hymenophyllaceae
- Genus: Hymenophyllum
- Species: H. cupressiforme

Binomial name
- Hymenophyllum cupressiforme Labill.

Synonyms
- Hymenophyllum antarcticum C.Presl

= Hymenophyllum cupressiforme =

Species of fern

Hymenophyllum cupressiforme is a southern hemisphere species of filmy fern. Found in moist sheltered areas, in or near rainforests. Occasionally found in drier protected areas. Leaves one cell thick. A small epiphytic fern found on tree trunks, rocks and fallen logs.

Fronds are 2 to 9 cm long, the main stem is not winged. The main leaf is branched and toothed. 0.5 to 6 cm long and 1.5 to 2.5 cm wide.
