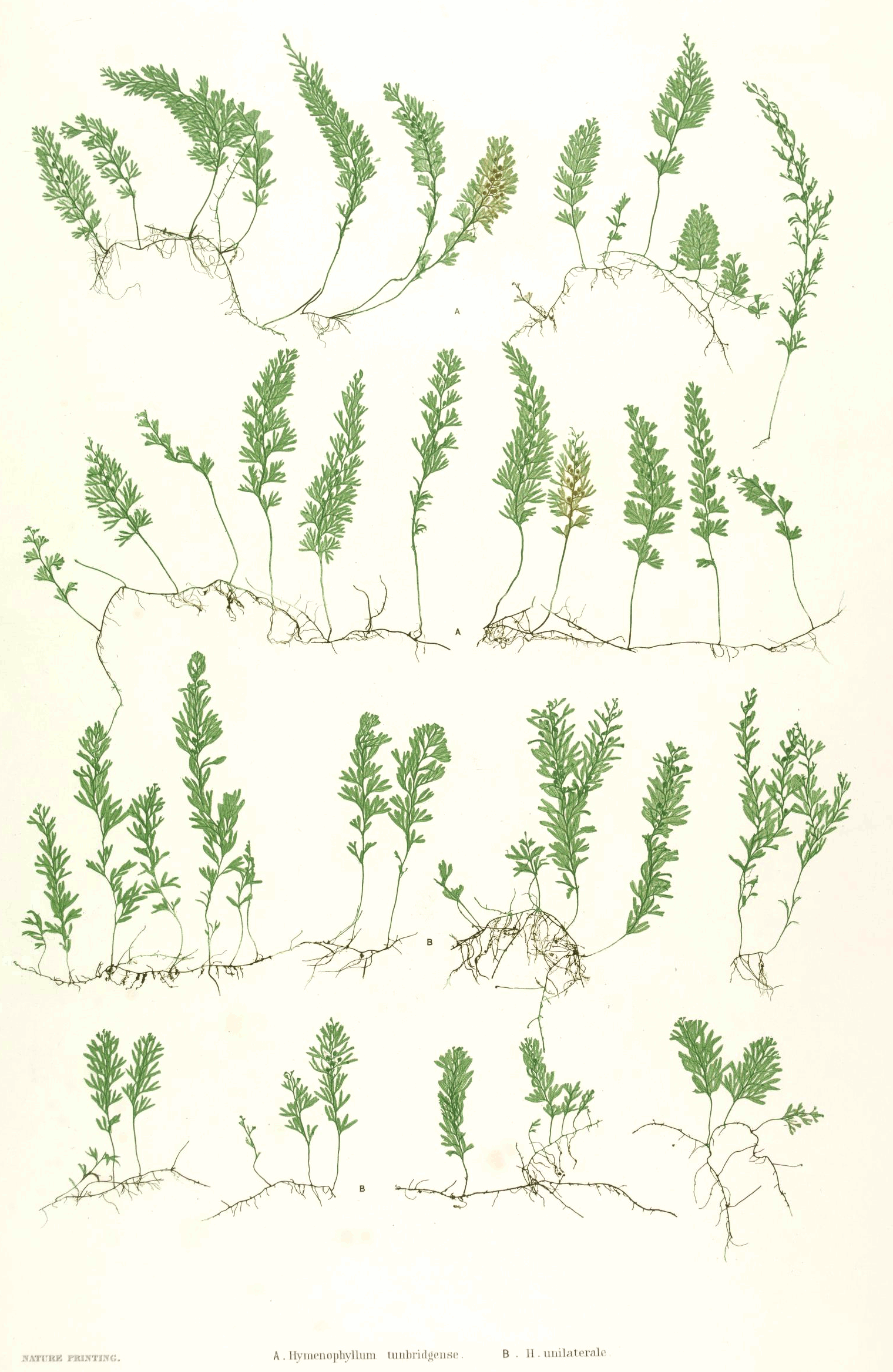
- A plate featuring Hymenophyllum species from The Ferns of Great Britain and Ireland

Scientific classification
- Kingdom: Plantae
- Clade: Tracheophytes
- Division: Polypodiophyta
- Class: Polypodiopsida
- Order: Hymenophyllales
- Family: Hymenophyllaceae
- Subfamily: Hymenophylloideae; Burnett
- Genus: Hymenophyllum; Sm.

Type species
- Hymenophyllum tunbrigense (L.) Sm.

Synonyms
- List: Amphipterum C.Presl 1849-51 ex (Copeland 1937) Copeland 1938; Apteropteris (Copeland 1937) Copeland 1938; Buesia (Morton 1932) Copeland 1938; Cardiomanes C.Presl 1843; Craspedoneuron van den Bosch 1861; Craspedophyllum (Presl 1843) Copeland 1938; Dermatophlebium C.Presl 1849-51; Diploophyllum Bosch; Hemicyatheon (Domin 1913) Copeland 1938; Hymenoglossum K.B.Presl, 1843; Leptocionium K.B.Presl, 1843; Leucomanes Presl 1851; Mecodium Presl ex (Copeland 1937) Copeland 1938; Meringium K.B.Presl, 1843; Microtrichomanes (Mettenius 1864 ex Prantl 1875) Copeland 1938; Myriodon (Copeland 1937) Copeland 1938; Myrmecostylum K.B.Presl, 1843; Pachyloma van den Bosch 1861; Pleuromanes (Presl 1851) Presl 1849-51; Pseudomecodium (Iwatsuki 1984) Satou 1997; Ptychomanes Hedwig 1800; Ptychophyllum K.B.Presl, 1843; Rosenstockia Copeland 1947; Serpyllopsis van den Bosch 1861; Sphaerocionium K.B.Presl, 1843; Tetralasma Philippi 1860

= Hymenophyllum =

Genus of plants

Hymenophyllum is a genus of ferns in the family Hymenophyllaceae. Its name means "membranous leaf", referring to the very thin translucent tissue of the fronds, which gives rise to the common name filmy fern for this and other thin-leaved ferns. The leaves are generally only one cell thick and lack stomata, making them vulnerable to desiccation. Consequently, they are found only in very humid areas, such as in moist forests and among sheltered rocks. They are small and easy to overlook.

== Species ==
As of October 2022, World Ferns accepted the following extant species:

Phylogeny of Hymenophyllum

- - - (Myrmecostylum)
      - - H. scabrum A.Rich.
        - - H. sanguinolentum (G.Forst.) Sw. (Piripiri)
          - H. villosum Colenso
      - - H. paniense Ebihara & K.Iwats.
        - - H. plicatum Kaulf.
          - - H. seselifolium C.Presl
            - H. tortuosum Hook. & Grev.
  - - - (Pleuromanes)
        - H. pallidum (Blume) Ebihara & K.Iwats.
        - - H. leratii Rosenst.
          - - H. flabellatum Labill. (Shiny filmy fern)
            - H. rufescens Kirk
    - - - (Hymenoglossum)
          - H. asplenioides (Sw.) Sw.
          - - H. cruentum Cav. (Helecho película)
            - H. heimii Tardieu
      - - - - (Diplophyllum)
              H. dilatatum (G.Forst.) Sw.
            - (Cardiomanes)
              H. nephrophyllum Ebihara & K.Iwats. (Kidney fern)
          - - (Fuciformia)
              - H. fuciforme Sw.
              - H. pulcherrimum Colenso
        - - - (Globosa)
              - - H. badium Hook. & Grev.
                - H. demissum (G.Forst.) Sw.
              - - H. caudiculatum Mart. (Pallante chilote)
                - - H. imbricatum Blume
                  - - - H. pluviatile Perrie & Brownsey
                      - - H. australe Willd. (Austral filmy ferm)
                        - H. fucoides (Sw.) Sw.
                    - - H. flexuosum A.Cunn.
                      - - H. gracilescens Domin
                        - - H. javanicum Spreng.
                          - H. riukiuense Christ
          - - - (Sphaerocionium)
                - section Microtrichomanes
                  - H. subobtusum Rosenst.
                  - - H. frankliniae Colenso
                    - - - H. pilosissimum C.Chr.
                        - - H. lanceolatum Hook. & Arn.
                          - H. obtusum Hook. & Arn.
                      - - H. lyallii Hook.fil.
                        - - - H. neocaledonicum (C.Chr.) Rouhan & C.Del Rio
                            - - H. braithwaitei Ebihara & K.Iwats.
                              - H. tomentosum Kunze
                          - - H. digitatum (Sw.) Fosberg
                            - - H. nitidulum (Bosch) Ebihara & K.Iwats.
                              - H. palmatifidum (Müll.Berol.) Ebihara & K.Iwats.
                - section Sphaerocionium
                  - H. malingii (Hook.) Mett.
                  - - H. hygrometricum (Poir.) Desv.
                    - - - H. capillare Desv.
                        - H. ferrugineum Colla
                      - - H. poolii Baker
                        - - - H. rufum Fée
                            - H. trichophyllum Kunth
                          - - - H. plumosum Kaulf.
                              - - - H. consanguineum C.V.Morton
                                  - H. microcarpum Desv.
                                - - - H. cocosense A.Rojas
                                    - H. hirsutum (L.) Sw.
                                  - - - H. saenzianum L.D.Gómez
                                      - H. semiglabrum Rosenst.
                                    - - H. sieberi (C.Presl) Bosch
                                      - H. trapezoidale Liebm.
                            - - - H. crispum Kunth
                                - H. delicatulum Sehnem
                              - - H. latifrons Bosch
                                - - - H. crassipetiolatum Stolze
                                    - H. fragile (Hedw.) Morton
                                  - - - H. ivohibense Tardieu
                                      - H. splendidum Bosch
                                    - - H. elegans Spreng.
                                      - - H. lineare (Sw.) Sw.
                                        - H. pulchellum Schltdl. & Cham.
            - - H. recurvum Gaudich.
              - - (Mecodium)
                  - - - H. mnioides Baker
                      - - H. rarum R.Br. (Narrow filmy fern)
                        - - H. novoguineense (Rosenst.) K.Iwats.
                          - H. ooides F.Muell. & Baker ex Baker
                    - - H. cuneatum Kunze
                      - - H. inaequale (Poir.) Desv.
                        - - H. balfourii Baker
                          - H. capense Schrad.
                  - - - H. myriocarpum Hook.
                      - - H. apiculatum Mett. ex Kuhn
                        - - H. protrusum Hook.
                          - H. undulatum (Sw.) Sw.
                    - - - H. kuhnii C.Chr.
                        - H. sibthorpioides (Bory ex Willd.) Mett. ex Kuhn
                      - - H. corrugatum Christ
                        - - H. wrightii Bosch
                          - - H. bryoides C.W.Chen, Ebihara & K.Y.Cheng
                            - - - H. fujisanense Nakai
                                - - H. polyanthos (Sw.) Sw. (Smooth filmy fern)
                                  - H. punctisorum Rosenst.
                              - - H. mikawanum (Seriz.) Seriz.
                                - - - H. fumarioides Bory ex Willd.
                                    - H. paniculiflorum C.Presl
                                  - - H. longissimum (Ching & P.S.Chiu) K.Iwats.
                                    - H. parallelocarpum Hayata
                - (Hymenophyllum)
                  - - section Hymenophyllum
                      - - - H. armstrongii (Baker) Kuhn
                          - H. marginatum Hook. & Grev. (Bordered filmy fern)
                        - - H. multifidum (G.Forst.) Sw.
                          - - H. minimum A.Rich.
                            - H. pumilio Rosenst.
                      - - - H. pectinatum Cav.
                          - - H. dentatum Cav. (Shushu-lahuén)
                            - H. dicranotrichum (C.Presl) Sadeb.
                        - - H. caespitosum Gaudich.
                          - - H. rugosum C.Chr. & Skottsb.
                            - - H. cordobense (Hieron.) C.Larsen & Arana
                              - H. tunbrigense (L.) Sm. (Tunbridge's filmy fern)
                  - - - subsection Dimidiata
                        - - H. simonsianum Hook.
                          - - H. humbertii C.Chr.
                            - H. perrieri Tardieu
                        - - H. ectocarpon Fée
                          - - H. peltatum (Poir.) Desv. (Alpine filmy fern)
                            - - H. falklandicum Baker (Falklands filmy fern)
                              - - H. secundum Hook. & Grev.
                                - H. wilsonii Hook. (Wilson´s filmy fern)
                    - - section Hemicyatheon
                        - - H. triangulare Baker
                          - - H. cupressiforme Labill. (Common filmy fern)
                            - H. pumilum C.Moore
                        - - - H. baileyanum Domin
                            - - H. blandum Racib.
                              - H. deplanchei Mett. ex Kuhn
                          - - H. feejeense Brack.
                            - - H. bivalve (G.Forst.) Sw.
                              - H. revolutum Colenso
                      - section Amphipterum
                        - - H. rolandi-principis Rosenst.
                          - - H. dimidiatum Mett. ex Kuhn
                            - H. soriemersum Rouhan & C.Del Rio
                        - - - H. macgillivrayi (Baker) Copel.
                            - H. serrulatum (C.Presl) C.Chr.
                          - - - H. chamaecyparicola T.C.Hsu & Z.X.Chang
                              - - H. devolii M.J.Lai
                                - - H. exsertum Wall. ex Hook.
                                  - H. oligosorum Makino
                            - - H. praetervisum Christ
                              - - - H. fuscum (Blume) Bosch
                                  - H. holochilum (Bosch) C.Chr.
                                - - H. pachydermicum Ces.
                                  - - H. barbatum (Bosch) Baker
                                    - - H. acanthoides (Bosch) Rosenst.
                                      - H. denticulatum Sw.

Unassigned species:
- Hymenophyllum abruptum Hook.
- Hymenophyllum acutum (C.Presl) Ebihara & K.Iwats.
- Hymenophyllum adiantoides Bosch
- Hymenophyllum aeruginosum (Poir.) Carmich.
- Hymenophyllum alveolatum C.Chr.
- Hymenophyllum amabile Morton
- Hymenophyllum andinum Bosch
- Hymenophyllum angulosum Christ
- Hymenophyllum angustum Bosch
- Hymenophyllum antillense (Jenman) Jenman
- Hymenophyllum applanatum (A.M.Gray & R.G.Williams) Ebihara & K.Iwats.
- Hymenophyllum apteryx M.Kessler & Sundue
- Hymenophyllum archboldii (Copel.) C.V.Morton
- Hymenophyllum assurgens M.Kessler & A.R.Sm.
- Hymenophyllum axillare Sw.
- Hymenophyllum bartlettii (Copel.) C.V.Morton
- Hymenophyllum batuense Rosenst.
- Hymenophyllum bicolanum Copel.
- Hymenophyllum bontocense Copel.
- Hymenophyllum brachyglossum A.Braun ex Kunze
- Hymenophyllum brachypus Sodiro
- Hymenophyllum brassii C.Chr.
- Hymenophyllum brevifrons Kunze
- Hymenophyllum brevistipes Liebm.
- Hymenophyllum bryophilum C.Chr.
- Hymenophyllum caparaoense Brade
- Hymenophyllum capillaceum Roxb.
- Hymenophyllum capurroi de la Sota
- Hymenophyllum cardunculus C.Chr.
- Hymenophyllum compactum Bonap.
- Hymenophyllum copelandii C.V.Morton
- Hymenophyllum crispatoalatum Hayata
- Hymenophyllum crispatum Wall. ex Hook. & Grev.
- Hymenophyllum cristatum Hook. & Grev.
- Hymenophyllum darwinii Hook.fil.
- Hymenophyllum deltoideum C.Chr.
- Hymenophyllum densipilosum A.Rojas
- Hymenophyllum dependens C.V.Morton
- Hymenophyllum diversilobum (C.Presl) Fée
- Hymenophyllum eboracense Croxall
- Hymenophyllum edanoi (Copel.) C.V.Morton
- Hymenophyllum edentulum (Bosch) C.Chr.
- Hymenophyllum elbertii Rosenst.
- Hymenophyllum elongatum J.W.Grimes
- Hymenophyllum emarginatum Sw.
- Hymenophyllum exquisitum T.C.Hsu & Y.S.Chao
- Hymenophyllum farallonense Hieron.
- Hymenophyllum fendlerianum Sturm
- Hymenophyllum ferax Bosch
- Hymenophyllum fimbriatum J.Sm.
- Hymenophyllum firmum Alderw.
- Hymenophyllum foersteri Rosenst.
- Hymenophyllum foxworthyi Copel.
- Hymenophyllum francii (Christ) Ebihara & K.Iwats.
- Hymenophyllum gardneri Bosch
- Hymenophyllum geluense Rosenst.
- Hymenophyllum glaziovii Baker
- Hymenophyllum gorgoneum Copel.
- Hymenophyllum hallieri Rosenst.
- Hymenophyllum hastatum A.Rojas
- Hymenophyllum helicoideum Sodiro
- Hymenophyllum hemidimorphum R.C.Moran & B.Øllg.
- Hymenophyllum hemipteron Rosenst.
- Hymenophyllum herzogii Rosenst.
- Hymenophyllum hieronymi (Brause) C.Chr.
- Hymenophyllum hirtellum Sw.
- Hymenophyllum horizontale C.V.Morton
- Hymenophyllum hosei Copel.
- Hymenophyllum humboldtianum E.Fourn.
- Hymenophyllum integrivalvatum C.Sánchez
- Hymenophyllum interruptum Kunze
- Hymenophyllum involucratum Copel.
- Hymenophyllum jamesonii Hook.
- Hymenophyllum jimenezii A.R.Sm. & M.Kessler
- Hymenophyllum johorense Holttum
- Hymenophyllum junghuhnii Bosch
- Hymenophyllum kaieteurum Jenman
- Hymenophyllum karstenianum J.W.Sturm
- Hymenophyllum kerianum Watts
- Hymenophyllum klabatense Christ
- Hymenophyllum krauseanum Phil.
- Hymenophyllum l´herminieri Mett. ex Kuhn
- Hymenophyllum lamellatum Stolze
- Hymenophyllum laminatum Copel.
- Hymenophyllum lanatum Fée
- Hymenophyllum latisorum M.Kessler & A.R.Sm.
- Hymenophyllum laxum (Copel.) C.V.Morton
- Hymenophyllum ledermannii Brause
- Hymenophyllum lehmannii Hieron.
- Hymenophyllum leptocarpum Copel.
- Hymenophyllum levingei C.B.Clarke
- Hymenophyllum lindenii Hook.
- Hymenophyllum lobatoalatum Klotzsch
- Hymenophyllum lobbii Moore ex Bosch
- Hymenophyllum longifolium Alderw.
- Hymenophyllum macroglossum Bosch
- Hymenophyllum macrosorum Alderw.
- Hymenophyllum macrothecum Fée
- Hymenophyllum maderense Gibby & Lovis
- Hymenophyllum matthewsii Bosch
- Hymenophyllum maxonii Christ ex Morton
- Hymenophyllum megistocarpum (Copel.) C.V.Morton
- Hymenophyllum melanosorum (Copel.) C.V.Morton
- Hymenophyllum microchilum (Baker) C.Chr.
- Hymenophyllum mirificum Morton
- Hymenophyllum molle C.V.Morton
- Hymenophyllum mortonianum Lellinger
- Hymenophyllum mossambicense (Schelpe) Schippers
- Hymenophyllum multialatum C.V.Morton
- Hymenophyllum multicristatum A.Rojas
- Hymenophyllum nahuelhuapiense Diem & J.S.Licht.
- Hymenophyllum nanostellatum Lellinger
- Hymenophyllum nanum Sodiro
- Hymenophyllum nitiduloides Copel.
- Hymenophyllum nutantifolium Alderw.
- Hymenophyllum ovatum Copel.
- Hymenophyllum pantotactum Alderw.
- Hymenophyllum paucicarpum Jenman
- Hymenophyllum penangianum Matthew & Christ ex Christ
- Hymenophyllum perparvulum Alderw.
- Hymenophyllum pilosum Alderw.
- Hymenophyllum platylobum Bosch
- Hymenophyllum plumieri Hook. & Grev.
- Hymenophyllum pollemonianum Rosenst.
- Hymenophyllum prionema Kunze
- Hymenophyllum proctoris C.Sánchez
- Hymenophyllum productum Kunze
- Hymenophyllum pyramidatum Desv.
- Hymenophyllum quetrihuense Diem & J.S.Licht.
- Hymenophyllum ramosii Copel.
- Hymenophyllum reinwardtii Bosch
- Hymenophyllum ringens Christ
- Hymenophyllum roraimense C.V.Morton
- Hymenophyllum rubellum Rosenst.
- Hymenophyllum rufifolium Alderw.
- Hymenophyllum rufifrons Alderw.
- Hymenophyllum ruizianum (Klotzsch) Kunze
- Hymenophyllum salakense Racib.
- Hymenophyllum sampaioanum Brade & Rosenst.
- Hymenophyllum semialatum T.C.Hsu
- Hymenophyllum senterreanum Dubuisson & Deblauwe
- Hymenophyllum seramense K.Iwats., M.Kato & Ebihara
- Hymenophyllum sericeum (Sw.) Sw.
- Hymenophyllum silvaticum C.V.Morton
- Hymenophyllum silveirae Christ
- Hymenophyllum simplex C.V.Morton
- Hymenophyllum sodiroi C.Chr.
- Hymenophyllum stenocladum (Ching & P.S.Chiu) K.Iwats.
- Hymenophyllum subdemissum Christ
- Hymenophyllum subrigidum Christ
- Hymenophyllum superbum Morton
- Hymenophyllum taiwanense (Tagawa) C.V.Morton
- Hymenophyllum talamancanum A.Rojas
- Hymenophyllum taliabense Alderw.
- Hymenophyllum tarapotense Stolze
- Hymenophyllum tayloriae Farrar & Raine (Taylor's filmy fern)
- Hymenophyllum tegularis (Desv.) Proctor & Lourteig
- Hymenophyllum tenerum Bosch
- Hymenophyllum thuidium Harr.
- Hymenophyllum todjambuense Kjellb.
- Hymenophyllum tomaniiviense (Brownlie) Ebihara & K.Iwats.
- Hymenophyllum treubii Racib.
- Hymenophyllum trichomanoides Bosch
- Hymenophyllum trichophorum (Alderw.) Ebihara & K.Iwats.
- Hymenophyllum trifoliatum (L.) Proctor & Lourteig
- Hymenophyllum turquinense C.Sánchez
- Hymenophyllum umbratile Diem & J.S.Licht.
- Hymenophyllum urbanii Brause
- Hymenophyllum valvatum Hook. & Grev.
- Hymenophyllum verecundum Morton
- Hymenophyllum veronicoides C.Chr.
- Hymenophyllum vestitum (C.Presl) Bosch
- Hymenophyllum viguieri Tardieu
- Hymenophyllum vittatum Copel.
- Hymenophyllum walleri Maiden & Betche
- Hymenophyllum whitei Goy

Extinct species include:

- †Hymenophyllum axsmithii Pigg et al (Ypresian, Eocene Okanagan Highlands North America)

== See also ==
- Trichomanes, the members of which are also called filmy ferns.
