= Tasmanian coniferous shrubbery =

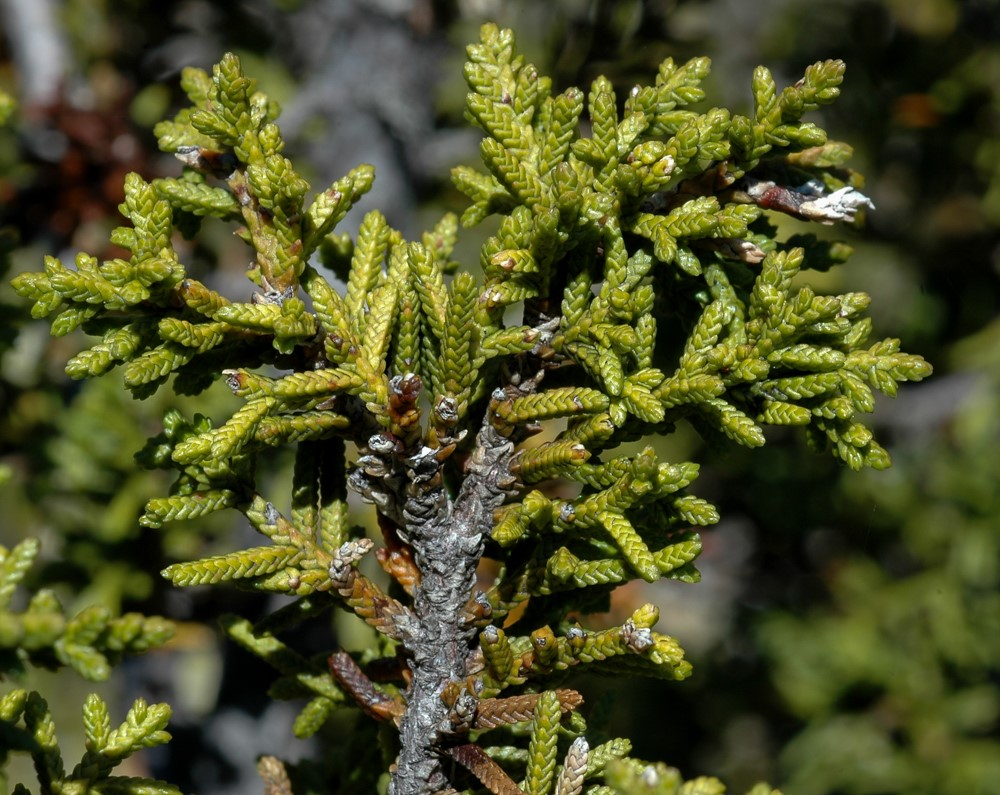
Diselma archeri

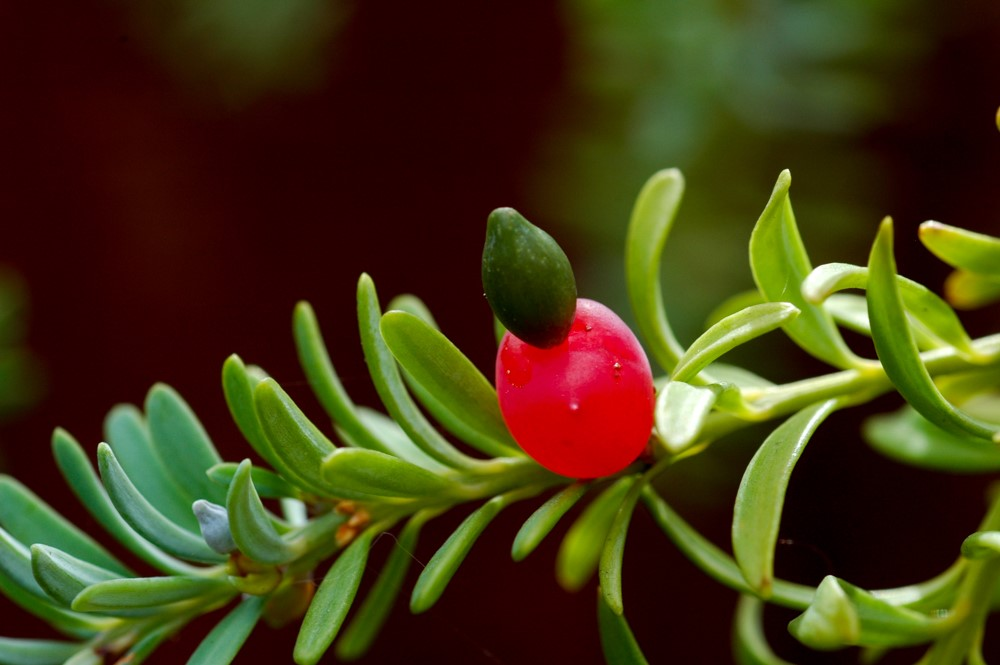
Podocarpus lawrencei

The vegetation in Tasmania's alpine environments is predominately woody and shrub-like. One vegetation type is coniferous shrubbery, characterised by the gymnosperm species Microcachrys tetragona, Pherosphaera hookeriana, Podocarpus lawrencei, and Diselma archeri. Distribution of these species is relevant with abiotic factors including edaphic conditions and fire frequency, and increasingly, the threat of climate change towards species survival exists. Conservation and management of coniferous shrubbery are necessary considering that the paleoendemic species, Microcachrys, Pherosphaera, and Diselma, have persisted in western Tasmanian environments for millions of years.

== Distribution ==
These coniferous shrub species are restricted to subalpine and alpine heathlands in western Tasmania, with the exception of Podocarpus lawrencei which lives on the mainland. The alpine environments where these conifers occur have high levels of conifer endemism, which is an ecologically habitat for coniferous shrub species.

Coniferous shrub species can be observed in Mount Field National Park in Tasmania's south west along the Tarn Shelf. All species can be observed in rocky environments with shallow soil above 1,000 m (3,300 ft).

== Ecology ==
Both the alpine environment and the harsh maritime climate have the pressures and limitations of wind exposure and ice abrasion for the woody and shrub-like habit of coniferous shrubbery. The lack of protective snow cover on Tasmanian mountains means that vegetation must be mechanically resistant to these elements, hence an ecologically habitat for coniferous shrub species. This is contrasted to alps of mainland Australia or New Zealand, where the presence of prolonged snow lie lead to the development of a grassland-herbland vegetation community.

Low productivity of the environment is indicated through the slow growth habit of the conifers, and the effects of fire are detrimental to the species. As well as this, physiological drought intolerance in conifers could influence the growth of vegetation considering the changing climate. The mosaic pattern of distribution is due to both fire history and the influence of precipitation and temperature. The exceptionally high species richness in subalpine vegetation is caused by this mosaic of vegetation communities.

== Floristics ==
Taxa that make up this vegetation type include:

Family	Species	Common name	Habit	Leaves	Cones	Distinguishing features
Podocarpaceae	Microcachrys tetragona	Creeping pine	Prostrate slow-growing conifer, 1–2 m (3 ft 3 in – 6 ft 7 in) in width	1–1.5 mm (0.039–0.059 in), dense, opposite and decussate along branchlets, giving a square appearance	Male and female cones on separate plants. Male cones small and terminal. Female cones terminal and fleshy and red when mature	The only natural prostrate conifer
Podocarpaceae	Pherosphaera hookeriana	Drooping pine	Small to medium, dense conifer shrub, 1.5–3 m (4 ft 11 in – 9 ft 10 in) in height, 1–4 m (3 ft 3 in – 13 ft 1 in) in width	Small to 2 mm (0.079 in), dense and appressed, spiralling, dark green to olive	Male and female cones on separate plants. Male cones solitary, terminal, round with purple brown scales. Inconspicuous female cones pendulous, brown when ripe	Leaves are arranged spirally.
Podocarpaceae	Podocarpus lawrencei	Mountain plumpine	Branched shrub growing over boulders, 0.5–2 m (1 ft 8 in – 6 ft 7 in) in height, 2–3 m (6 ft 7 in – 9 ft 10 in) in width	Crowded, rigid, linear-oblong, 6–15 mm (0.24–0.59 in) long, green to blue-green upper surface, paler undersurface with prominent vein	Male cones cylindrical, 5 mm (0.20 in) long. Female cones solitary 3–5 mm (0.12–0.20 in) long, with a fleshy scale. Seed stalk expands to become red and succulent with a green seed	A spreading pine with linear leaves 6–15 mm (0.24–0.59 in) long
Cupressaceae	Diselma archeri	Dwarf pine	Shrub to small tree, prostrate in exposed areas, spreading forming dense, weeping bushes, 2–6 m (6 ft 7 in – 19 ft 8 in) in height, 1–1.4 m (3 ft 3 in – 4 ft 7 in) in width	Small and scale-like, opposite, decussate and overlapping	Immature male and female cones on separate plant but inconspicuous. Male cones small, solitary and terminal with crimson pollen sacs. Female cones spherical, about 4 mm (0.16 in), with two pairs of scales. Seeds small, winged, two per cone	Uppermost branches with drooping tips

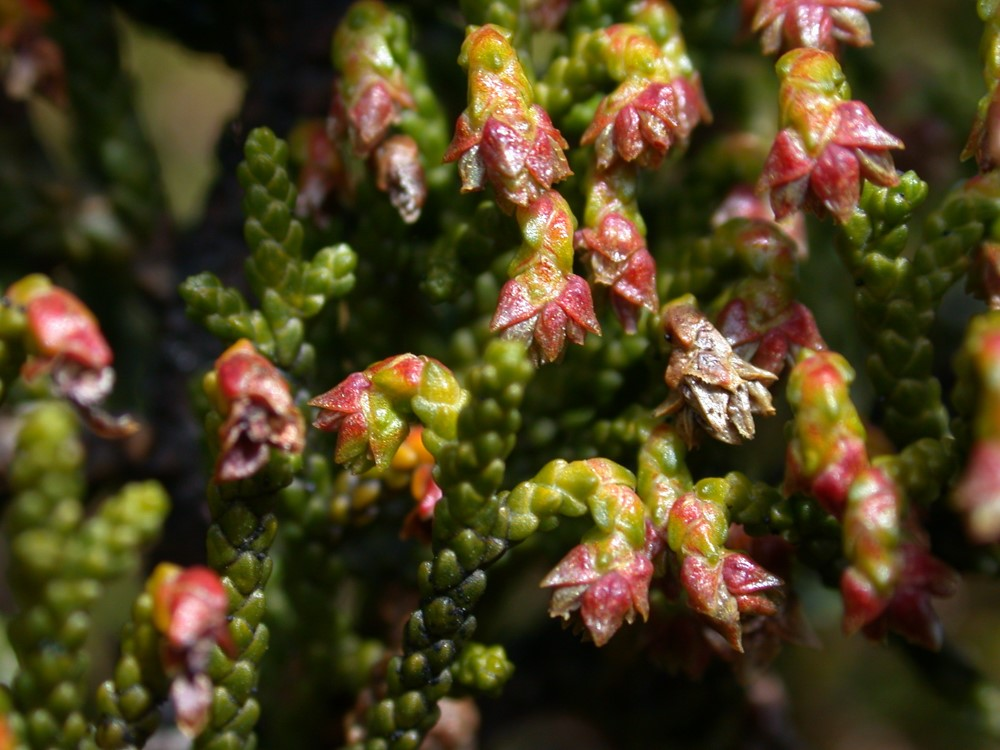
Pherosphaera hookeriana

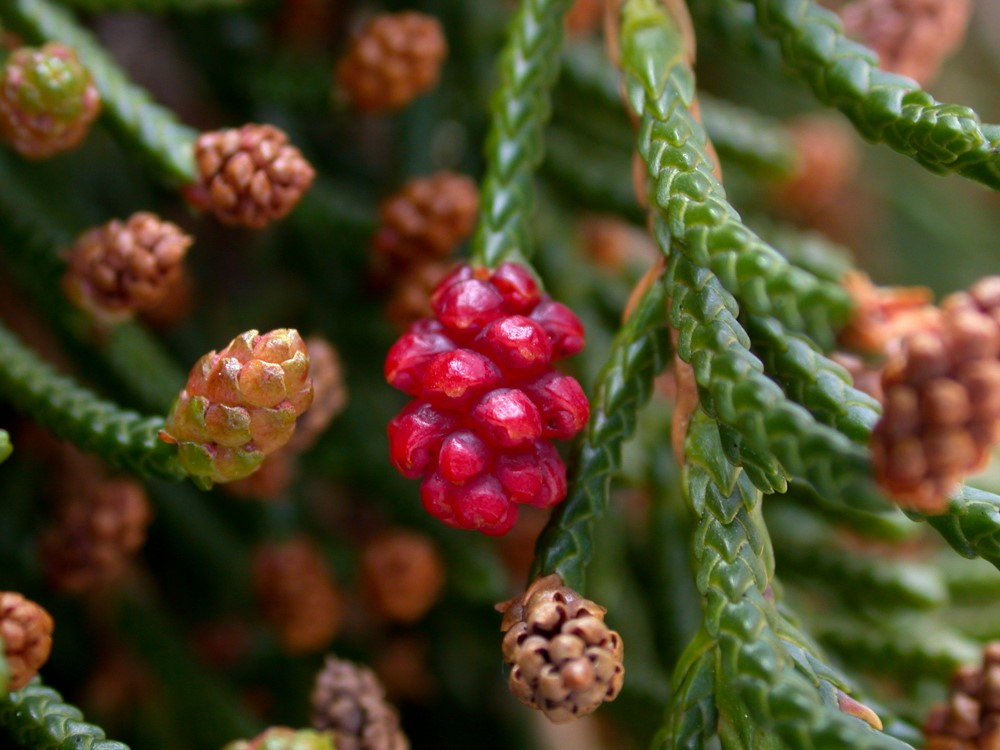
Microcachrys tetragona

== Paleoendemism ==
The alpine vegetation of western Tasmania is associated with paleoendemic species, i.e. species that are old and geographically confined. Microchachrys, Pherosphaera and Diselma are paleoendemic coniferous shrub clades of alpine western Tasmania. These clades were found on other southern hemisphere continents according to fossil, and they are restricted in their distribution. The environment they inhabit currently is not productive with infrequent fire, which is evident through the short and open canopy structure of the vegetation. Distribution of paleoendemic species gives insight into the similarities to environments in which ancestral lineages occurred and the current environmental characteristics allowing the species survival. Persistence of these species is due to natural selection, not dispersal limitation. The conservation of certain ecological characteristics promotes survival. The table below shows clade ages and scores of paleoendemism, which are calculated by dividing the age of the clade by the square root of the area of current occupancy. Scores of >500 m^{−1} are considered high.

Paleoendemism of coniferous shrubs
Conifer clade	Family	Age (Myr)	Score (m^{−1})
Pherosphaera	Podocarpaceae	115	2300
Microcahchrys	Podocapraceae	130	1772
Diselma	Cupressaceae	30	463

== Threats ==
Tasmania is one of 5 global hotspots for conifer diversity, with one of the highest rates of endemism in conifer flora in the world. The threats of climate change to Tasmanian coniferous shrubbery exist. Physical intolerance to drought and fire sensitivity are characteristic of the conifers and potential for distribution and recolonization is limited by ways of seed dispersal and slow growth rates.

In Tasmania, climate change is a rise in mean annual temperature, changed rainfall seasonality and weather events such as drought and fire. Dry lightning and drier soil conditions in western Tasmania pose a threat to coniferous shrubbery and other alpine vegetation types. The probability that extreme weather events cause that the extinction of species is higher than the effects of rise in temperature or rainfall.

== Conservation ==
For conservation of the Tasmanian coniferous shrubbery species, monitoring and prediction of climate events and refugia are fundamental. Field surveys and aerial photograph monitoring is in place in order to collect the required information. In order to reduce the risk of fire, 'fuel stove only areas' have been implemented in the Tasmanian Wilderness World Heritage Area, where the majority of Tasmanian coniferous shrubbery is located. These measures have been introduced in the hope of preventing the loss of conifer populations in both rainforest and alpine communities and to promote their survival into the foreseeable future.
