= Alpine vegetation of Tasmania =

Alpine vegetation refers to the zone of vegetation between the altitudinal limit for tree growth and the nival zone. Alpine zones in Tasmania can be difficult to classify owing to Tasmania's maritime climate limiting snow lie to short periods and the presence of a tree line that is not clearly defined.

== Distribution ==
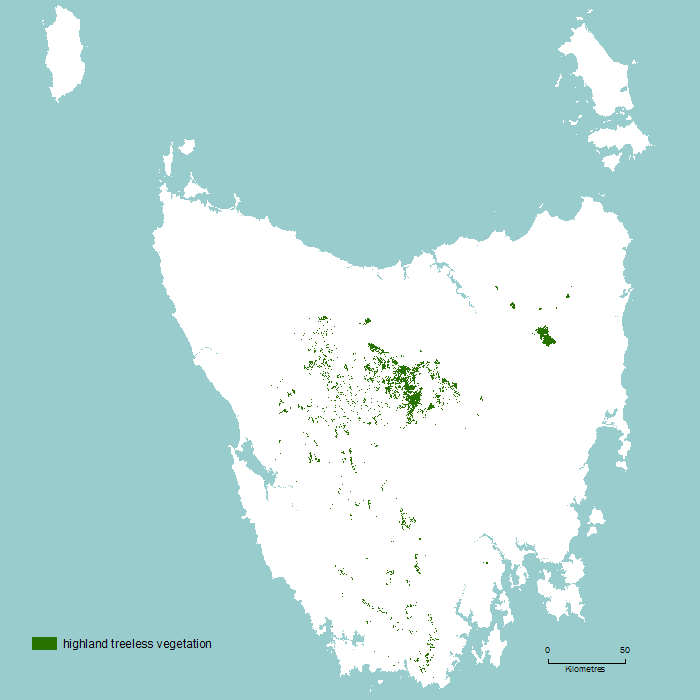
Distribution of high treeless vegetation across Tasmania (DPIPWE)

Approximately 111 700 ha of Tasmania is alpine and subalpine habitat (2%). Australia wide, there is only 198 400 ha meaning 56% of Australia's alpine & subalpine habitat is restricted to Tasmania. The altitude at which alpine vegetation occurs ranges from 750m in the southwest to 1400m in the northeast.

== Classification ==
From the Latin word Alpinus, from Alpes ‘Alps’. Globally, alpine vegetation is defined zone of vegetation between the altitudinal limit for tree growth and the nival zone. In areas where mountains can be considered typically alpine, the vegetation zones are often divided into distinct altitudinal bands. The alpine band usually consists of low growing herbaceous species given the cessation of most woody vegetation at the upper limit of the subalpine band. The upper limit of the alpine band often gives way to bare rock and permanent snow which continues on to the summit.

In Tasmania, such distinctive altitudinal bands do not occur. Typically the tree line is not well defined and usually located close to the mountain summits, often no more than a few hundred meters below. There is no permanent snow lie and vegetation continues to the summits. Often in Tasmania, the dominant species of a mountain's vegetation will gradually decrease in height with altitude to become a component of the alpine shrubbery. This environmental gradient allows for the subtle sorting of species into communities without the existence of an abrupt break from forest to shrubland. Consequently, Tasmanian alpine and treeless subalpine vegetation is often considered as a single vegetation unit given the term alpine. This approach is justifiable as of the 300(+) species found in the alpine and treeless subalpine zones, only 10 are restricted to the area above the climatic tree-line.

== Characteristics ==
=== Geology ===
Tasmania's alpine landscape is dominated by two bedrock systems originating from different geological periods. In the eastern and central parts of the state, Jurassic dolerite caps the summits having intruded into the Permian and Tertiary sediments. These dolerite caps have a characteristic topography having an elevated rocky rim and a short, steep face above rock scree. Chemically, dolerite is potentially a very rich source of nutrients however the slow rate of its weathering only allows for soils of moderate fertility.

Conversely, the mountains of the west and southwest are made up mainly of Precambrian and Ordovician quartzites, sedimentaries and conglomerates. They occur as a series of elongated ridges in a north–south arrangement. These rocks provide very nutrient poor skeletal soil and the main nutrient resource is accumulated through from degrading vegetation in humus and shallow peats.

=== Climatic factors ===
==== Rainfall and snow ====
It is generally accepted that rainfall increases with altitude and there is considerable rainfall in Tasmania's alpine regions (1000-1500mm per year). This does not correspond with water availability for plants however which is also dictated by numerous other factors such as soil type, slope angle, wind action and the presence of snow/ice (plants cannot utilise frozen water). Consequently, the availability of water for alpine plants is not consistent and often inadequate.

Winter drought is not a concerning factor in Tasmania as it is very uncommon for water to freeze below root depth. When snow melt occurs the soil is brought to field capacity and any additional water is lost through run off. The period of maximum water availability correlates with active growth of alpine species and flowering season, however Tasmania's characteristically skeletal alpine soils retain little water even at field capacity. As a consequence, summer drought is a critical determinant of the Tasmanian alpine environment.

==== Wind ====
At high altitudes wind is often strong and continuous over long periods. Consequently, wind in alpine regions imposes severe mechanical stress on plants. As a consequence, alpine species require strong root systems to maintain anchorage in the soil. High winds also contribute to soil erosion by moving fine soil particles. These particles blown over the vegetation by high winds can effectively prune erect vegetation. Intense glazing winds occur in winter and late spring.

In Tasmania strong winds are most common close to the equinoxes and during winter. During winter, wind direction is predominantly southerly to southwesterly. Such winds can cause localised snow drifts prolonging the snow lie in given areas. Frequent hot northerly airflows also occur during January–March which have a strong desiccating effect on the alpine soils, placing the plants under transpirational stress.

==== Temperature ====
The decline in air temperature with increasing altitude is a well documented phenomenon due to the simultaneous drop in atmospheric pressure and air density. Temperature influences most phases of a plant's life cycle such as vegetative growth, seed germination, seedling emergence and survival, pollinator visits and seed production.

Leaf temperature and air temperature can be very differential and is regarded as the underlying cause of plant dwarfism in alpine regions. Plant leaf temperatures will generally be warmer than air temperatures by day but cooler at night. The greatest differential occurs during spring when solar radiation is high but air temperature is low. Such differentials place the plant under considerable water stress.

In Tasmania the variation in temperature between day and night can be highly significant. For example, a summer day on the Central Plateau could be above 30 °C followed by a night temperature of 0 °C. This differential is less substantial closer to the ground. Additionally, soil temperature is much less variable and at a shallow depth of 5–10 cm, day/night temperatures will be more or less constant.

==== Radiation ====
At alpine altitude, levels of direct radiation are higher than that found at sea level. This is due to the atmosphere being less dense at higher altitudes. Increased exposure to shortwave ultraviolet (UV) is potentially damaging to plants and can cause damage to the plant's protoplasm and possible death. Tasmania's mountains are relatively low in altitude (generally below 1500m) in comparison to that of other regions of the world thus UV radiation is not as big a factor compared to that of other alpine habitats.

== Ecology ==
Alpine environments in Tasmania often feature an intricate mosaic of different plant communities such as dwarf forest, conifer shrubbery, sclerophyll shrubbery, heath, bog, bolster moor, grassland and herbfield. This mosaic is not just a response to exposure or edaphic factors but is also strongly influenced by fire disturbance. Fire disturbance strongly influences alpine plant community distribution due to alpine vegetation's slow successional response.

Fires in alpine environments are often intense because they usually occur during extreme fire promoting weather or after prolonged drought. Additionally alpine shrubby vegetation contains aromatic oils and contain large accumulations of dead foliage which burns rapidly. As a consequence much of the peat surface layer is consumed and woody plants such as conifers are completely killed off. Re-establishment is an extended process as a consequence of the very low rates of survival and the uncertainty of seed availability and distribution.

Cushion plant and bolster moor species are active in the early phases of succession. Over the first 10 years these species slowly increase amongst grass colonisers. After 20 years of succession a network of small cushions emerges through grass and herbs and displaces these species in wetter areas. These species actively grow in areas where there is surface flow of water and consequently these bolster communities make shifting areas of very wet conditions. Consequently, the water is unable to form permanent water courses and is dispersed in small dams. Because of this, these species are often referred to as ecological-engineers.

Grasses and dry herbaceous communities are replaced by sedges, Astelia bog and bolster. After 50 years of succession, heaths and shrubberies form progressive invasion of woody species most of which become established in old bolster moor cushions which have dried. Coniferous heath takes much longer to establish. Estimations based on areas that have been burnt in the past suggest that 150–200 years of succession is required to develop 10-20% cover of conifers as a low mat under 10 cm in height.

== Human impact ==
=== Grazing ===
The direct effects of grazing such as eating and trampling the vegetation causes a reduction in structural complexity and an increase in bare ground cover. These effects are much more pronounced in areas of higher productivity. The indirect effects of grazing can be equally destructive such as the introduction of exotic weeds and fertilizer application by aerial spreading.

=== Leisure effects ===
The varying levels of impact activities such as skiing, walking and camping are not adequately assessed. Alpine plants such as cushion plants can be particularly sensitive to trampling and occasionally escaped camp fires have resulted in devastating consequences.

=== Fire ===
Natural wildfires have been part of Tasmania's alpine environment for a long period in the recent evolutionary life of the present alpine flora. It is unlikely that indigenous fire practices would have caused much alteration to wildfire frequency in alpine environments. However fire frequency has likely been altered by the activities of European settlers and their industries since 1803. Observations suggest that areas occupied by fire sensitive species have dwindled (e.g. Athrotaxis) while fire adapted species have expanded.

=== Climate change ===
Global ambient temperatures have increased considerably (average 0.7oC) over the last 100 years (Slatyer 2010). In alpine areas, changes in precipitation regimes have already had a noticeable impact on snow persistence, depth and area. Such changes to snow regimes are expected to alter the composition and distribution of alpine vegetation communities. Additionally, many species may face additional competition due to expansion of species ranges to higher altitudes. Wildfires poses an additional threat to alpine plants and animals, with many species apparently vulnerable to an increase in fire frequency.

Increased levels of UV radiation may penetrate to the earth's surface as a consequence of damage to the ozone layer in recent times. As a consequence the detrimental effects of shortwave UV may become more apparent in Tasmania's alpine regions especially in the lower latitudes.

== Plant adaptations ==
Tasmania's alpine plants have developed a variety of physiological, morphological and behavioral adaptations to deal with the challenges they face in their environment. Typically, Tasmanian alpine plants have a low primary productivity and correspondingly slow growth rates. For example, Epacris petrophila shoots grow on average only 1 cm y-1. Alpine plants are often opportunistic in their growth with seasonal variation in their growth rate being manifest through internode extensions. Additionally Tasmania's alpine plants have life cycles which are very precisely linked to their short growing season. This is accomplished following a rapid growth surge in spring.

The alpine vegetation community in Tasmania has generally adopted stress tolerance rather than stress avoidance mechanisms. As stresses imposed on an environment become more intense, the range of adaptive biological solutions lessens. Consequently, there is a trend of morphological convergence and similar life/growth forms. The cushion community in the alpine environment is a perfect example, as the seven major cushion forming species in Tasmania are representative of five different families. The densely crowded shoots with a high degree of branching, restrict air movement and maintain a moist internal atmosphere within the cushion. This provides insulation against extreme temperature fluctuations and minimal wind disturbance.

Another example of morphological convergence is the predominance of small-leaved species in alpine vegetation. Small needle-shaped leaves with a relatively large surface-area to volume ratio are efficient in rapid energy transfer and heat dispersion while retaining structural strength. Scleromorphy is a common feature amongst alpine species and has provided an evolutionary advantage as Australia's recent climate has become more arid.

Typically, most of Tasmania's alpine plants are evergreen perennials. The main advantage of the evergreen habit is that the plant does not have to expend energy on new photosynthetic organs each year. It also allows the plants to conduct photosynthesis all year round when conditions are favourable.

Plants in alpine environments are subjected to water stress from a combination of inadequate precipitation, thin soils, periodic high winds and insolation. Numerous morphological adaptations are therefore situated around reducing transpirational water loss. Adaptations include thick cuticles, rolled leaf margins, sunken stomata or lacking leaves altogether. Some plants have dense hairs on the underside of their leaves or thick wax coated trichomes.

Photosynthetic production may be limited not just by low temperature and desiccation but also by mineral nutrient stress. Nitrogen and phosphorus are frequently limiting in Tasmania's alpine environment. Adaptations include mycorrhizal associations, proteoid roots, daucoid roots, and being carnivorous or semi-parasitic.

As part of the research in Tasmania's Central Highlands, part of the Australian Mountain Research Infrastructure Facility project, researchers installed monitoring infrastructure to collect real-time climate, weather, and soil data. Experiments include climate manipulation, such as using a rain exclusion shelter to study the effects of drought on alpine flora and invertebrates. Additionally, phenocams are being used to track vegetation response to weather changes, aiming to understand ecosystem-level changes.

== Plant communities ==
=== Bolster heath ===
Bolster heath or cushioned moorland is a patchwork of low growing very compact plants. Five families (6 species) occur in Tasmania. A further three families (7 species) contain plants which regularly present a cushion habit but not exclusively. Young cushions may grow vigorously in the presence of permanent free water. The high mountain cushion community is typically composed of Dracophyllum minimum, Pterygopappus lawrencei, and Phyllachne colensoi.

=== Deciduous heath ===
The dominant species of this vegetation is Nothofagus gunnii, which grows as a small tree up to 3 m in height. It is Tasmania's only deciduous tree. It prefers well-drained areas, and, as a consequence, often grows on slopes or amongst boulder scree. The species is very fire sensitive and thus limited to areas where fire access is prevented or severely restricted.

=== Coniferous heath/shrubbery ===
The coniferous vegetation is represented by two gymnosperm families, Cupressaceae (Diselma archeri, Athrotaxis cupressoides, A. selaginoides) and Podocarpaceae (Michrocachrys tetragona, Microstrobos niphophilus, Podocarpus lawrencei). This vegetation type has a patchy distribution in areas topographically protected from fire. This vegetation would likely be the climax vegetation of the region in the absence of fire.

=== Heath ===
Alpine heath is the most widespread, most diverse vegetation type in Tasmanian alpine environments. Many families are present however this vegetation is dominated by species from Ericaceae and Proteaceae. The diverse range of communities is distributed according to variation in soil conditions, drainage, exposure and fire history. Tall heaths with plants up to 2m (Orites acicularis, Leptospermum rupestre, Coprosma nitida) are usually found in areas of better drainage usually with a rock strewn surface. Low heaths (15-50+ cm), (Baeckea gunniana, Epacris serpyllifolia, Richea sprengelioides) are more frequently found on more peaty soils and frequently border wet areas.

=== Tussock grassland ===
Tussock grassland is mainly restricted to comparatively deep, well-drained soils. In drier areas, Poa labillardieri is dominant in tall, dense tussocks with shrubs of Pimelea pygmaea, Leucopogon stuartii, and Epacris petrophila, which may merge into Eucalyptus coccifera woodlands. In wetter, more peaty soils, tall tussock grassland gives way to a lower, sod tussock community in which Poa gunnii is dominant with rosette shrubs such as Velleia montana, Celmisia asteliifolia, and Plantago antarctica.

== Bibliography ==
- Bridle, K.L. (2001). Recovery in alpine heath and grassland following burning and grazing, eastern Central Plateau, Tasmania, Australia. Arctic, Antarctic, and Alpine Research 33, 348–356.
- Brodführer, U. (1955). Der Einfluss Einer Abgestuften Dosierung von Ultravioletter Sonnenstrahlung auf das Wachstum der Pflanzen. Planta 45, 1–56
- Crowden, R.K. (2005). Alpine Vegetation. ‘Vegetation of Tasmania’ (Ed. In Reid) 333–356.
- Department of Primary Industries, Parks, Water and Environment (DPIPWE).
- Friend, A.D., & Woodard, F.I. (1990). Evolutionary and ecophyiological responses of mountain plants to the growing season environment. Advances in Ecological Research 20, 60–112.
- Grime, J.P. (1979). ‘Plant strategies and vegetation processes’. (John Wiley: Chichester.)
- Jackson, W.D. & Brown, M.J. (2005). Pattern and Process in the Vegetation. ‘Vegetation of Tasmania’ (Ed. In Reid) 357–380.
- Kirkpatrick, J.B. (1982) Phytogeographical analysis of Tasmanian alpine floras. Journal of biogeography 9, 255–271.
- Kirkpatrick, J.B. (1983) Treeless plant communities of Tasmanian alpine floras. Proceedings of the Ecological society of Australia 12, 61–77.
- Kirkpatrick, J.B. (1984) The Impact of Fire on Tasmanian Alpine Vegetation and Soils. Australian Journal of Botany 32, 613–629.
- Kirkpatrick, J.B. (1986) Tasmanian alpine biogeography and ecology interpretation of the past. In ‘Floar and Fauna of Alpne Australasia: Ages and Origins’ (Ed. B.A. Barlow) 227–242.
- Kirkpatrick, J.B., & Gibson, N. (1984). Dynamics of a Tasmanian bolster string fen. Vegetatio 58, 71–78.
- Montgomery, K. (2006) Variation in Temperature With Altitude and Latitude. The Journal of Geography 105, 133–135.
- Mooney, H.A., & Dunn, E.L. (1970). Convergent evolution of Mediterranean - climate evergreen sclerophyll shrubs. Evolution 24, 292–303.
- New Oxford American Dictionary 2nd edition © 2005 by Oxford University Press, Inc.
- Seymour, D.B., Calver, C.R. (1998) Time and Space diagram. Mineral Resources Tasmania and AGSO 1998.
- Slatyer, R. (2010) Climate change impacts on Australia's alpine ecosystems. The ANU Undergraduate Research Journal 2, 81–97.
- Tranquillini, W. (1964). The physiology of plants at high altitude. Annual Review of Plant Physiology 15, 329–346.
- Williams, P.R. (1977) Geological survey of Port Davey. Tasmania Department of Mines.
