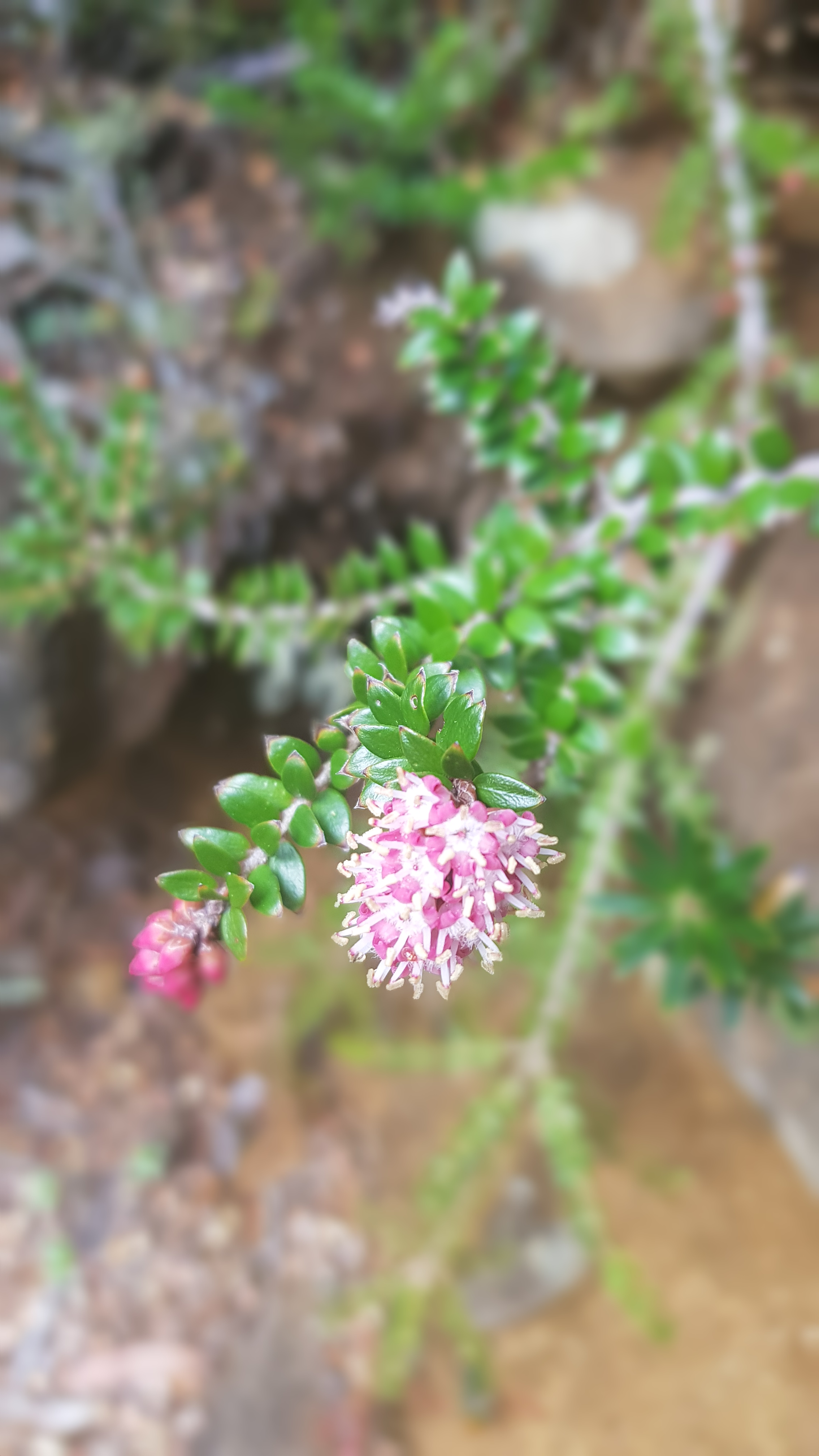
- In Mount Field National Park

Scientific classification
- Kingdom: Plantae
- Clade: Tracheophytes
- Clade: Angiosperms
- Clade: Eudicots
- Clade: Asterids
- Order: Ericales
- Family: Ericaceae
- Genus: Trochocarpa
- Species: T. cunninghamii

Binomial name
- Trochocarpa cunninghamii (DC.) W.M.Curtis
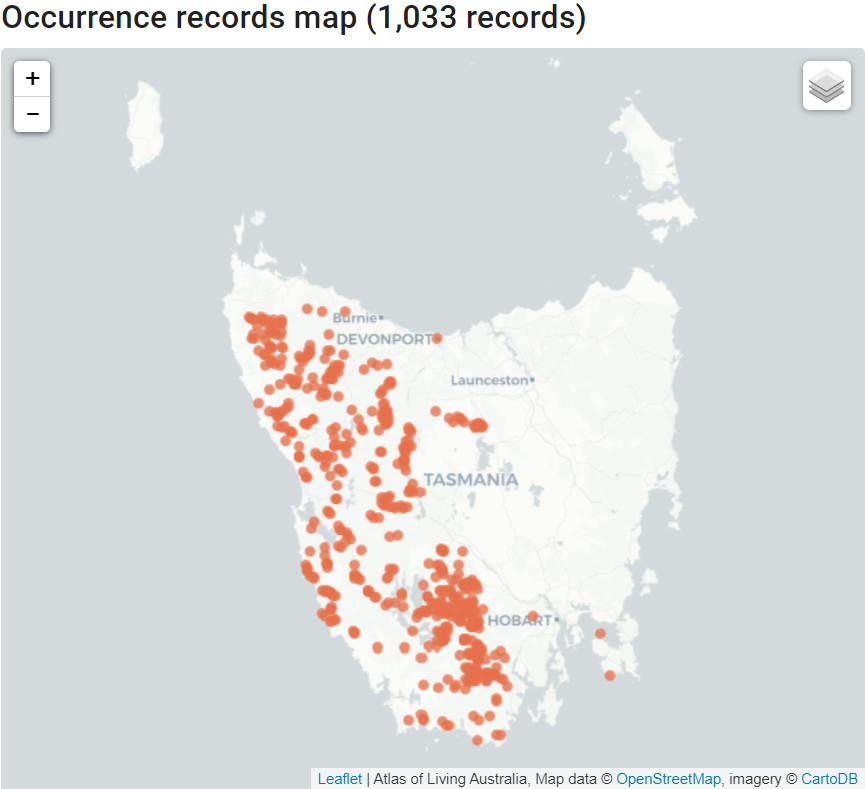
- Occurrence records from Atlas of Living Australia

Synonyms
- Decaspora cunninghami DC. orth. var.; Decaspora cunninghamii DC.; Trochocarpa disticha var. cunninghami F.Muell. orth. var.; Trochocarpa disticha var. cunninghamii (DC.) Benth.

= Trochocarpa cunninghamii =

Species of flowering plant

Trochocarpa cunninghamii is a flowering plant species of the family Ericaceae and is endemic to Tasmania. It is commonly referred to as straggling purpleberry due to its round flattened mauve drupe fruits. It is a woody shrub usually found in the understorey of rainforests and subalpine forests in the Central Plateau and western Tasmania.

== Description ==
Trochocarpa cunninghamii is a low, scrambling prostrate shrub with reddish new growth. Its leaves are at alternate at right angles to the stem, 5–10 mm (0.20–0.39 in) long, with 5-7 veins visible from the underside of the leaf, the lower surface, with a lighter shade of green. In summer, pink and white tubular flowers are borne in dangling spikes near the end of branches. The purplish blue-black fruit is present year-round and is described as round flattened mauve drupes about 10 mm (0.39 in) in diameter.

The foliage of this species can be mistaken for T. gunnii as it has a similar appearance, but T. cunninghamii can be easily distinguished from T. gunnii by its growth habit. T. gunnii is an erect, dense to open shrub to small tree 3–6 m (10–20 ft) high and 2–3 m (6 ft 7 in – 9 ft 10 in) wide, whereas T. cunninghamii has a low scrambling habit, 0.2–1.5 m (8 in – 4 ft 11 in) high and 0.5–2 m (1 ft 8 in – 6 ft 7 in) wide.

== Taxonomy ==
This species was first formally described in 1839 by Augustin Pyramus de Candolle, who gave it the name Decaspora cunninghami in his Prodromus Systematis Naturalis Regni Vegetabilis, and in 1963 was transferred to the genus, Trochocarpa as T. cunninghamii by Winifred Curtis. The specific epithet (cunninghamii) honours English botanist Allan Cunningham, who circumnavigated Australia between 1816 and 1839 to collect plants.

== Distribution and habitat ==
Trochocarpa cunninghamii is found only in subalpine forests and rainforest in Tasmania. It is more commonly found at high altitudes than T. gunnii. Trochocarpa disticha also closely resembles T. cunninghamii, however T. disticha is a large shrub with larger leaves, restricted to far southeast Tasmania and regarded as uncommon.

== Ecology ==
The hairy-covered, red petal tube of T. cunninghamii may exclude insect access, but is attractive to birds.
