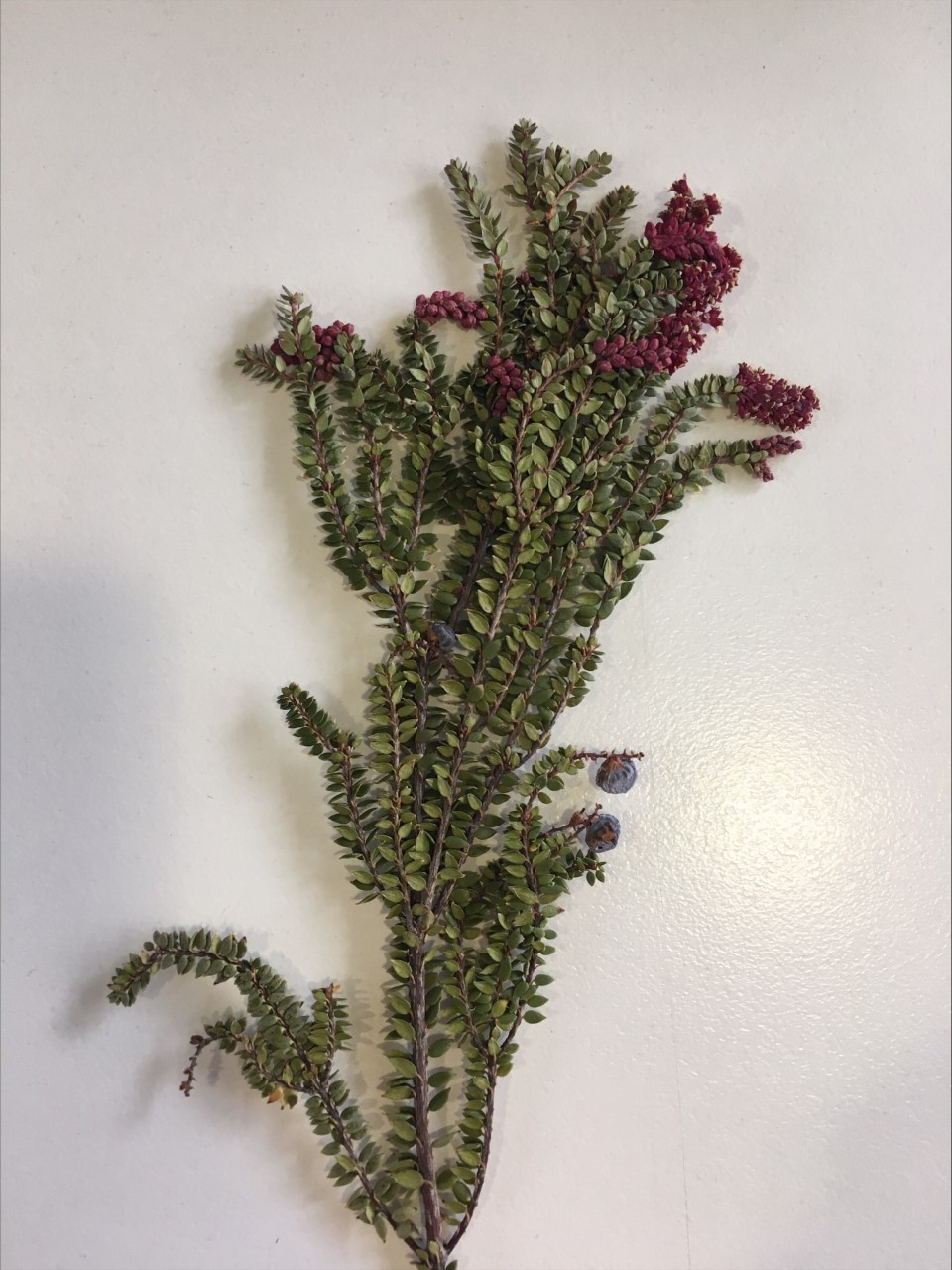

Scientific classification
- Kingdom: Plantae
- Clade: Tracheophytes
- Clade: Angiosperms
- Clade: Eudicots
- Clade: Asterids
- Order: Ericales
- Family: Ericaceae
- Genus: Trochocarpa
- Species: T. thymifolia

Binomial name
- Trochocarpa thymifolia (R.Br.) Spreng.

Synonyms
- Decaspora thymifolia R.Br.; Decaspora oxycoccoides A.Cunn. ex DC.

= Trochocarpa thymifolia =

Species of plant

Trochocarpa thymifolia is a species of flowering plant from the family Ericacae and is endemic to Tasmania. It is a widespread alpine and subalpine shrub with small leaves, pink to red flowers and blue to purple fruit. Originally described by botanist Robert Brown in 1810, it is a widespread Tasmanian endemic that inhabits the state's mountain regions.

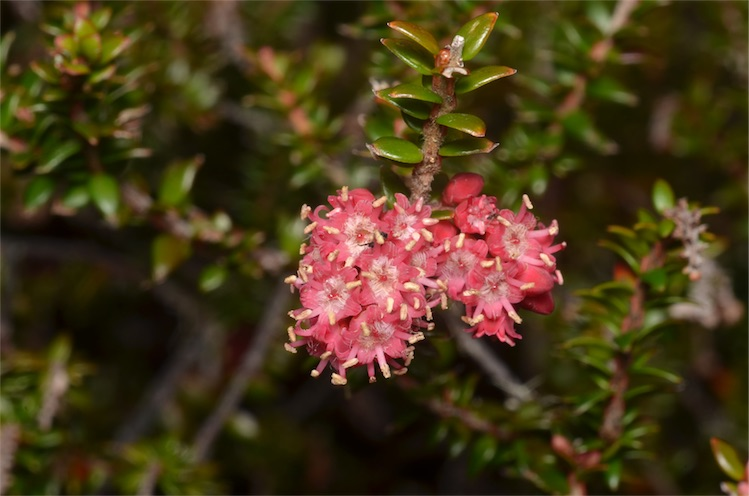
Flowers in Mount Field National Park

== Description ==
Mature plants form erect, bushy shrubs growing to around 1m in height. Leaves are small (2–4 mm long), densely-packed, ovate to elliptic in shape and are alternate in arrangement. The succulent leaves are dark green, with a red tinge around the margins and are slightly lighter green on the underside. Parallel venation is clear on the abaxial surface (underside) of the leaf which is a distinguishing characteristic of the Ericaceae family. The tubular flowers possess 5 lobes, of about 4mm in length and range from pink to red in colour. Inflorescences form a dense cluster of drooping terminal spikes that are 1.5 cm long with the yellow filaments of the stamens being prominent sitting just outside of the floral tube. Fruits are spherical, fleshy and present in a blue to purple/mauve colour at approximately 8 mm in diameter. Fruits and flowers typically occur simultaneously, creating stunning displays of contrasting colours and textures alongside the neat foliage.

== Taxonomy ==
This taxon was first formally described in 1810 by Robert Brown who gave it the name Diaspora thymifolia in Prodromus Florae Novae Hollandiae et Insulae Van Diemen. In 1824, Kurt Polycarp Joachim Sprengel changed the name to Trochocapra thymifolia in Systema Vegetabilium. The specific epithet (thymifolia) means "thyme-leaved".

== Species differentiation ==
Trochocarpa thymifolia is distinguished from the other three rainforest species of Trochocarpa occurring in Tasmania by its leaves that are only 2–4 mm (0.079–0.157 in) long.

== Habitat and distribution ==
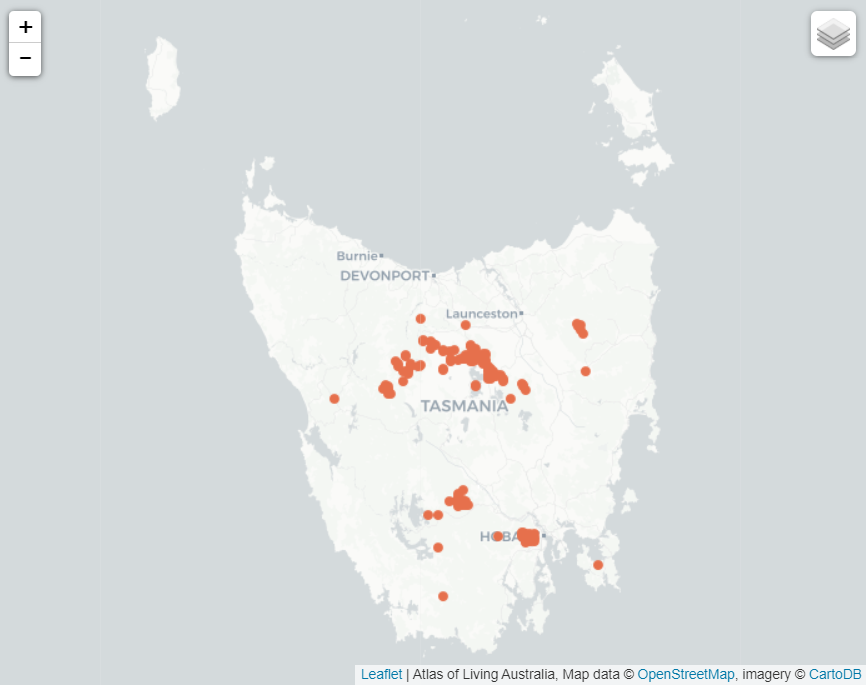
Distribution of Trochocarpa thymifolia from Atlas of Living Australia.

Trochocarpa thymifolia is widespread in Tasmania, often found in alpine heaths, open subalpine forests woodlands and occasionally inhabiting sites that are more exposed amidst dolerite boulders. The species favours areas that have acidic soils, are well drained and moist in its environment.

The species is widespread around the state clustering in alpine zones above the tree line. This range in altitude varies across the state from 750m in the southwest to 1400m in the northeast. Populations are largely located at Mount Field, Mount Wellington (Kunanyi), Tasman and Southwest National Parks in the south and Cradle Mountain-Lake St Clair, Walls of Jerusalem and Ben Lomond National Parks in the north.
