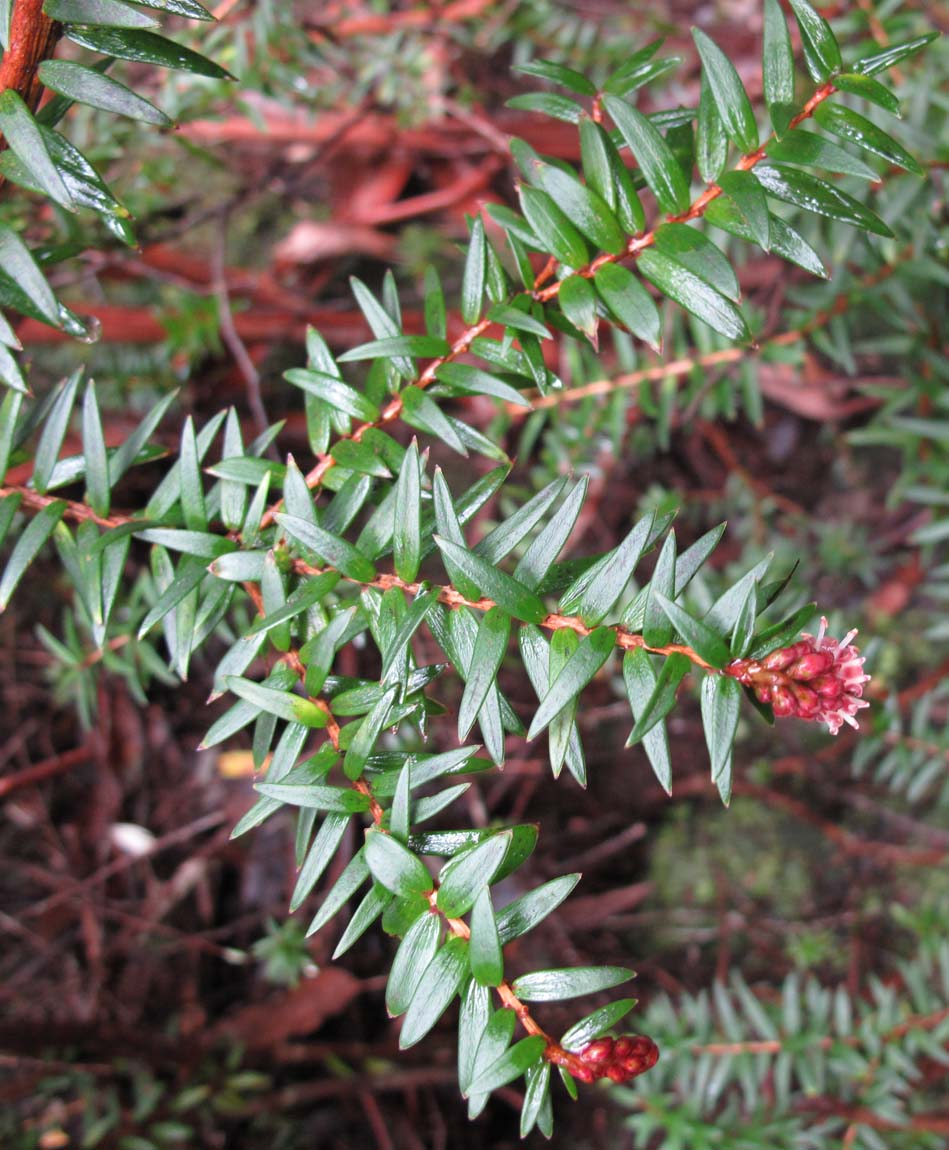

Scientific classification
- Kingdom: Plantae
- Clade: Tracheophytes
- Clade: Angiosperms
- Clade: Eudicots
- Clade: Asterids
- Order: Ericales
- Family: Ericaceae
- Genus: Trochocarpa
- Species: T. disticha

Binomial name
- Trochocarpa disticha (Labill.) Spreng.
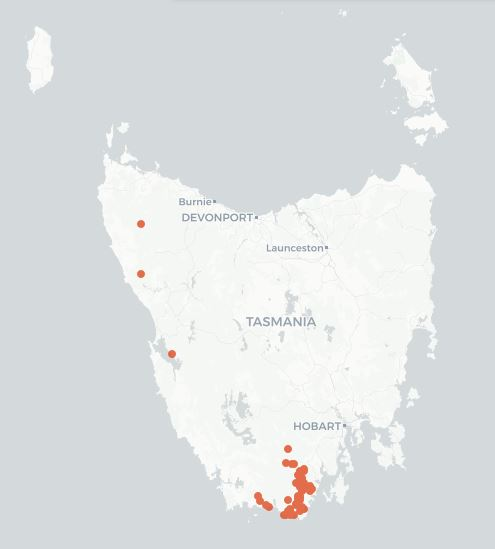

Synonyms
- Cyathodes disticha Labill.; Decaspora disticha (Labill.) R.Br.; Trochocarpa disticha (Labill.) Spreng. var. disticha

= Trochocarpa disticha =

Species of plant

Trochocarpa disticha is a flowering plant species of the family Ericaceae and is endemic to Tasmania. It is a tall shrub with slender branches, its leaves egg-shaped to narrowly lance-shaped and arranged in two opposite rows (distichous), reddish flowers in curved spikes with bell-shaped petal tubes, and deep to pale purple drupes.

== Description ==
Trochocarpa disticha is a shrub that typically grows to a height of up to 5 m (16 ft), with thin, spreading branches and branchlets with longitudinal grooves. The leaves are arranged in two opposite rows, egg-shaped to narrowly lance-shaped, 3–8 mm (0.12–0.31 in) long and often reddish, with 3 to 5 veins on the lower surface. The flowers are arranged in down-curved spikes 10–15 mm (0.39–0.59 in) long with small bracts and bracteoles about half as long as the sepals. The sepals are 2–3 mm (0.079–0.118 in) long and the petals are joined at the base to form a bell-shaped tube 3–4 mm (0.12–0.16 in) long, the lobes shorter than the tube. Flowering occurs from September to October and the fruit is a pale to deep purple drupe 6–10 mm (0.24–0.39 in) in diameter.

== Taxonomy ==
This species was first formally described in 1805 by Jacques Labillardière who gave it the name Cyathodes disticha in his Novae Hollandiae Plantarum Specimen. In 1824, Kurt Polycarp Joachim Sprengel transferred the species to Trochocarpa as T. disticha in Systema Vegetabilium. The specific epithet (disticha) means "in two rows or lines". This species closely resembles T. cunninghamii, which has larger leaves, and could be confused with T. gunnii which has smaller leaves than this species.

== Distribution and habitat ==
Trochocarpa disticha is endemic to Tasmania and can be found in the rainforests of the far southeast mostly below 400m, but is uncommon.
