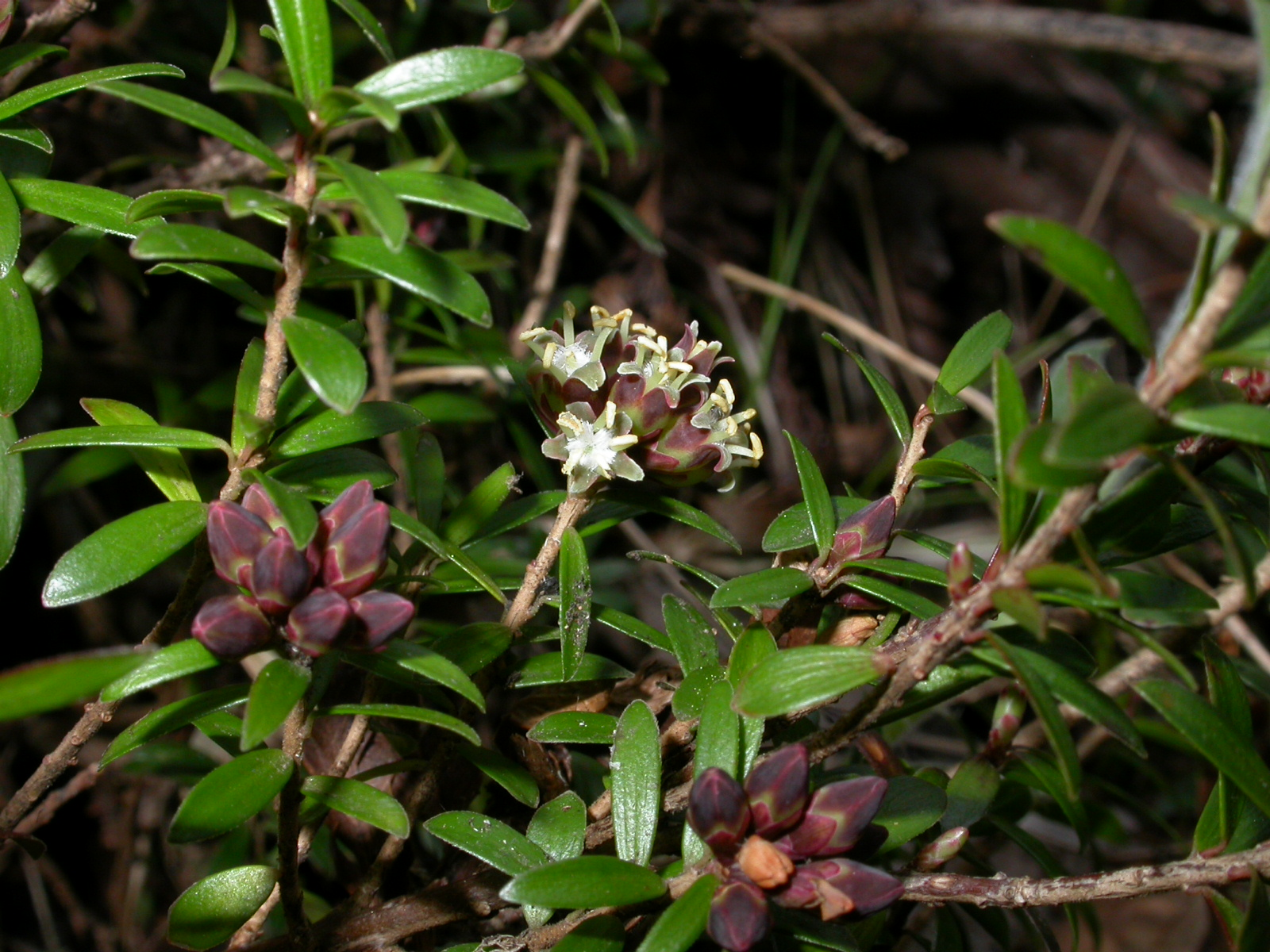
- In the Alpine National Park

Scientific classification
- Kingdom: Plantae
- Clade: Tracheophytes
- Clade: Angiosperms
- Clade: Eudicots
- Clade: Asterids
- Order: Ericales
- Family: Ericaceae
- Genus: Trochocarpa
- Species: T. clarkei

Binomial name
- Trochocarpa clarkei (F.Muell.) F.Muell.

Synonyms
- Decaspora clarkei F.Muell.

= Trochocarpa clarkei =

Species of flowering plant

Trochocarpa clarkei, commonly known as lilac berry, is a species of flowering plant in the family Ericaceae. It is a dense, often low-lying shrub with oblong leaves and bisexual flowers arrange in dense flowering spikes, usually on old wood, with maroon and green petals joined at the base to from an urn-shaped to bell-shaped tube with dense tufts of hairs in the throat. The fruit is a bluish-purple drupe.

== Description ==
Tracocarpa clarkei is a dense, often low-lying shrub that grows to a height of up to about 30 cm (12 in) and sometimes forms roots at the nodes. The leaves are oblong to elliptic, 3–11 mm (0.12–0.43 in) long 1.2–3.5 mm (0.047–0.138 in) wide and glabrous, the lower surface a paler shade of green with 3 to 7 more or less parallel veins. The flowers are bisexual and borne in dense spikes of 5 to 11, usually on old wood, with a bract 1.0–1.6 mm (0.039–0.063 in) wide and 2 bracteoles 1–2 mm (0.039–0.079 in) long under the sepals. The sepals are egg-shaped, 2–3 mm (0.079–0.118 in) long and the petals are joined at the base to form an urn-shaped to bell-shaped tube 2.5–4 mm (0.098–0.157 in) long. The petal tube is maroon, green at the base, 2.5–4 mm (0.098–0.157 in) long with lobes 2–3 mm (0.079–0.118 in) long. The anthers protrude beyond the end of the petal tube. The fruit is a flattened spherical, bluish-purple drupe about 7–8 mm (0.28–0.31 in) long.

== Taxonomy ==
This species was first formally described in 1855 by Ferdinand von Mueller who gave it the name Decaspora clarkei in his paper Definitions of rare or hitherto undescribed Australian plants, from specimens collected in "shady ravines at Mount Wellington, half buried in decaying leaves". In 1867, von Muller transferred the species to Trochocarpa as T. clarkei in his Fragmenta Phytographiae Australiae. The specific epithet (clarkei) honours Andrew Clarke, "President of the Philosophical Society".

== Distribution and habitat ==
Lilac berry is endemic to alpine and sub-alpine areas of Victoria in Australia, usually growing near rocks, or in sheltered areas under snow gums (Eucalyptus pauciflora).

== Ecology ==
The fruits of lilac berry appear in autumn, about 8 mm (0.31 in) in diameter and are eaten by small mammals and birds.
