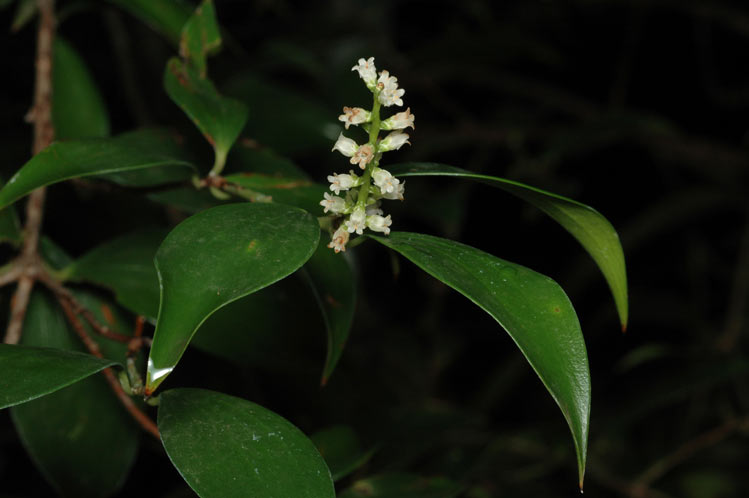
- In the Australian National Botanic Gardens

Scientific classification
- Kingdom: Plantae
- Clade: Tracheophytes
- Clade: Angiosperms
- Clade: Eudicots
- Clade: Asterids
- Order: Ericales
- Family: Ericaceae
- Genus: Trochocarpa
- Species: T. laurina

Binomial name
- Trochocarpa laurina (Rudge) R.Br.

= Trochocarpa laurina =

Species of tree

Trochocarpa laurina, commonly known as tree heath, axebreaker, sandberry, wheel-fruit or waddy wood, is a species of flowering plant of the family Ericaceae and is endemic to eastern Australia. It is a compact shrub to crooked tree with elliptic leaves at the ends of branches, tube-shaped white flowers arranged singly or in spikes at the ends of branches, and purple to black drupes.

== Description ==
Trochocarpa laurina is a compact shrub to crooked tree that typically grows to a height of up to 13 m (43 ft) and has grey to brownish black bark. Its leaves are arranged alternately or in pseudowhorls at the ends of branches, and are elliptic to broadly elliptic, 50–70 mm (2.0–2.8 in) long and 20–30 mm (0.79–1.18 in) wide on a petiole 3–6 mm (0.12–0.24 in) long, and pink at first. The leaves have 5 to 7 more or less longitudinal veins and the lower surface is a paler shade of green. The flowers are arranged singly or in spikes 20–40 mm (0.79–1.57 in) long on the ends of branches. The flowers are white with bracteoles about 0.4 mm (0.016 in) long and sepals about 1 mm (0.039 in) long. The petals are joined at the base forming a tube 2–3 mm (0.079–0.118 in) long with a bearded throat and erect, bearded lobes. Flowering occurs from December to January and the fruit is a purple to black drupe.

== Taxonomy ==
This species was first formally described in 1807 by Edward Rudge who gave it the name Cyathodes laurina in the Transactions of the Linnean Society of London from specimens collected near Port Jackson. In 1810, Robert Brown transferred the species to Trochocarpa as T. laurina.

== Distribution and habitat ==
Tree heath grows in gullies, amongst rock and on creekbanks and escarpments in warm-temperate, sub-tropical and sometimes dry rainforest on the coast and nearby ranges in New South Wales and Queensland. In August 1990, the then-largest known specimen was documented in the Sydney suburb of Eastwood; it stood 13.4 m (44 ft) tall.

== Ecology ==
The fruit is dispersed by mammals, birds and flowing water, but germination is slow and may take up to 2 years. The plants can resprout after fire. The fruit is eaten by Lewin's honeyeater and the pied currawong. Host to the parasitic mistletoe Korthasella rubra ("korthal mistletoe"). Host tree for epiphytes including bird's-nest fern and elk horn fern. Used by Aboriginal Australians for waddies.
