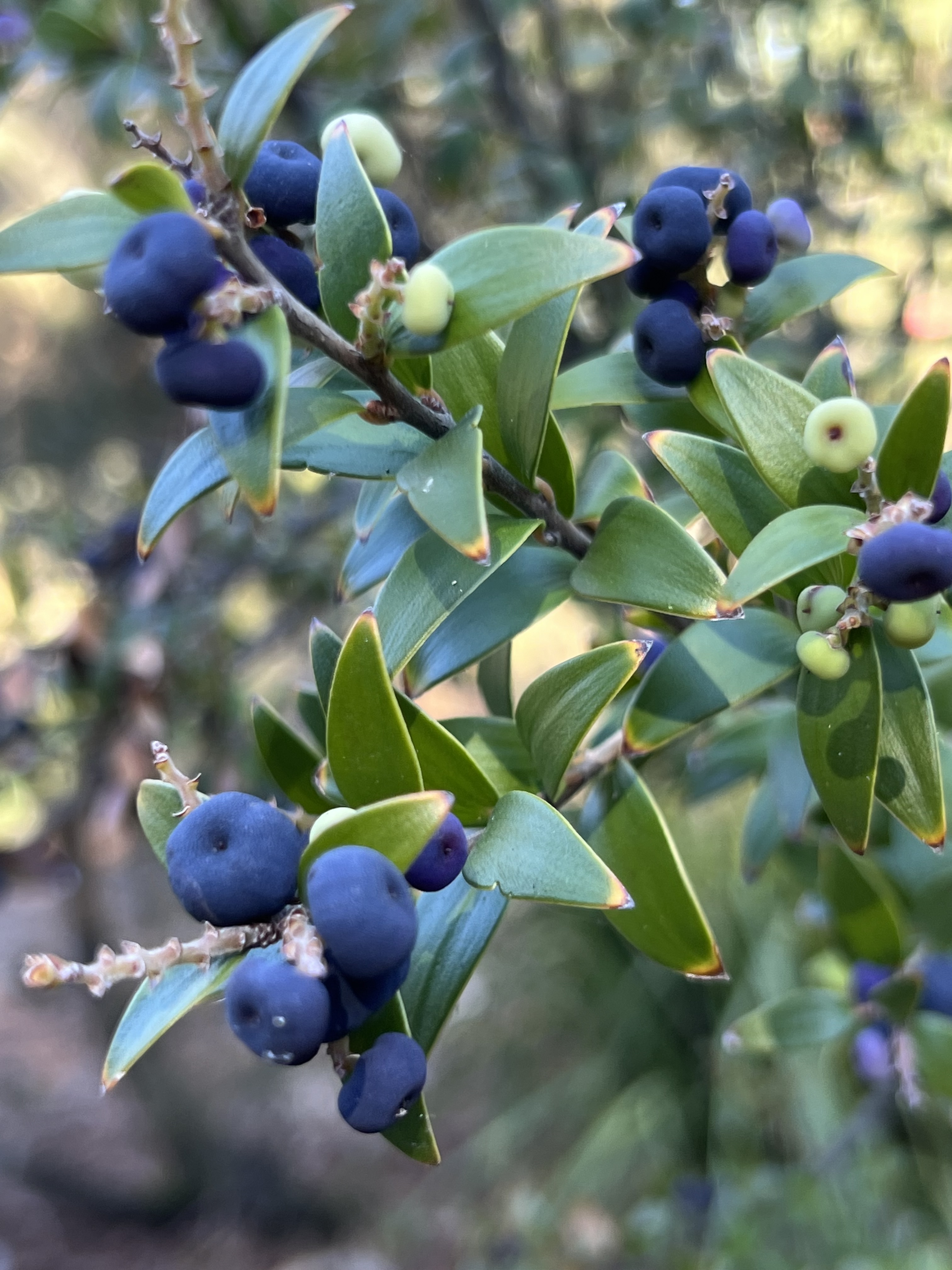
- In the Australian National Botanic Gardens

Scientific classification
- Kingdom: Plantae
- Clade: Tracheophytes
- Clade: Angiosperms
- Clade: Eudicots
- Clade: Asterids
- Order: Ericales
- Family: Ericaceae
- Genus: Trochocarpa
- Species: T. montana

Binomial name
- Trochocarpa montana J.B.Williams & J.T.Hunter

Synonyms
- Trochocarpa sp. A

= Trochocarpa montana =

Species of tree

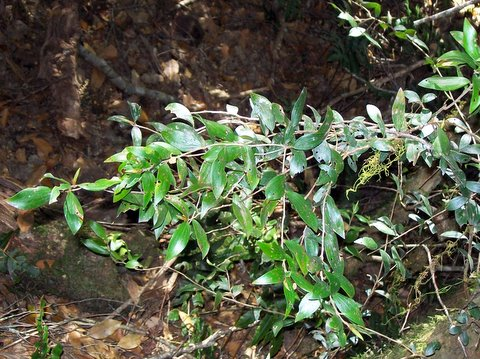
At Barrington Tops

Trochocarpa montana, commonly known as mountain tree-heath, is a species of flowering plant in the family Ericaceae and is endemic to high altitude places in New South Wales. It is a much-branched shrub with narrowly egg-shaped, narrowly elliptical to broadly egg-shaped leaves, racemes of creamy-brown, tube-shaped flowers, and purple to black drupes.

== Description ==
Trochocarpa montana is a much-branched shrub that typically grows to a height of 2–10 m (6 ft 7 in – 32 ft 10 in) and has fawn to grey branchlets. Its leaves are arranged alternately along the stems, narrowly egg-shaped, narrowly elliptical to broadly egg-shaped, 10.5–50 mm (0.41–1.97 in) long and 4–26 mm (0.16–1.02 in) wide on a petiole 1.5–4.5 mm (0.059–0.177 in) long. The leaves are glossy green on the upper surface and paler below, with 5 to 7 veins visible, especially on the lower surface. The flowers are arranged in racemes on the ends of branches and in leaf axils, each flower on a pedicel 0.2–0.5 mm (0.0079–0.0197 in) long with bracts and bracteoles 1.1–1.6 mm (0.043–0.063 in) long and 1.0–1.1 mm (0.039–0.043 in) wide. The sepals are egg-shaped to elliptic, 1.2–2.0 mm (0.047–0.079 in) long and 0.6–1.1 mm (0.024–0.043 in) wide. The petals are creamy-brown, 2.8–3.5 mm (0.11–0.14 in) long and joined at the base to form a tube 1.6–2.1 mm (0.063–0.083 in) long with lobes 1.2–1.6 mm (0.047–0.063 in) long.

== Taxonomy ==
Trochocarpa montana was first formally described in 2007 by John Beaumont Williams and John T. Hunter in the journal Telopea, from specimens collected in the Cathedral Rock National Park in 1995. The specific epithet (montana) refers to the occurrence of all populations at high elevations.

== Distribution and habitat ==
Mountain tree-heath mostly occurs in and on the margins of rainforest with Antarctic beech or sassafras or in wet forests dominated by Eucalyptus obliqua.
