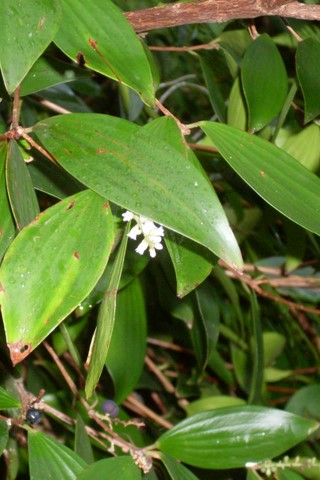
- Trochocarpa laurina

Scientific classification
- Kingdom: Plantae
- Clade: Tracheophytes
- Clade: Angiosperms
- Clade: Eudicots
- Clade: Asterids
- Order: Ericales
- Family: Ericaceae
- Subfamily: Epacridoideae
- Tribe: Styphelieae
- Genus: Trochocarpa; R.Br.

= Trochocarpa =

Genus of flowering plants

Trochocarpa is a genus of about 16 species of flowering plants in the family Ericaceae native to Australia, New Guinea, Borneo and Malesia. Plants in the genus Trochocarpa are shrubs or small trees, the leaves with more or less parallel veins, flowers in small clusters, each with 5 sepals, petals joined to form a cylindrical or bell-shaped tube, and the fruit a more or less spherical drupe.

== Description ==
Plants in the genus Trochocarpa are shrubs or small trees. The leaves are a paler shade on the lower surface and have a few branching, more or less parallel veins visible on the lower surface, and a short petiole. The flowers are borne in small spikes in leaf axils or on the ends of branches on older wood, the flowers sessile with a small bract and 2 bracteoles at the base of the 5 egg-shaped sepals. The petals are joined at the base to form a cylindrical or bell-shaped tube. The stamens protrude from the end of the petal tube with their filaments attached to the tube. The ovary is glabrous with 8 to 11 locules, each locule with one ovule. The fruit is a drupe with a pulpy mesocarp and a hard endocarp.

== Taxonomy ==
The genus Trochocarpa was first formally described in 1810 by Robert Brown in his Prodromus Florae Novae Hollandiae et Insulae Van Diemen, and the first species he described (the type species) was Trochocarpa laurina. The genus name (Trochocarpa) is from Ancient Greek trochos meaning "wheel", and carpos meaning "fruit".

=== Species ===
The following is a list of Trochocarpa species accepted by Plants of the World Online as at May 2024:

- Trochocarpa arfakensis (Kaneh. & Hatus.) Sleumer – New Guinea
- Trochocarpa celebica (J.J.Sm.) Steenis – Borneo, Sulawesi
- Trochocarpa clarkei (F.Muell.) F.Muell. – Victoria Australia
- Trochocarpa cunninghamii (DC.) W.M.Curtis (1963) – Tasmania, Australia
- Trochocarpa dekockii (J.J.Sm.) H.J.Lam – New Guinea
- Trochocarpa dispersa Sleumer – New Guinea
- Trochocarpa disticha (Labill.) Spreng. – Tasmania
- Trochocarpa gjelleruppi (J.J.Sm.) H.J.Lam – New Guinea
- Trochocarpa gunnii (Hook.f.) Benth. – Tasmania
- Trochocarpa laurina (Rudge) R.Br. – NSW, Qld, New Guinea
- Trochocarpa montana J.B.Williams & J.T.Hunter – N.S.W.
- Trochocarpa novae-zealandiae Colenso
- Trochocarpa nubicola (Wernham) Sleumer – New Guinea
- Trochocarpa nutans (J.J.Sm.) H.J.Lam – New Guinea
- Trochocarpa papuana (C.H.Wright) Sleumer – New Guinea
- Trochocarpa thymifolia (R.Br.) Spreng. – Tasmania
