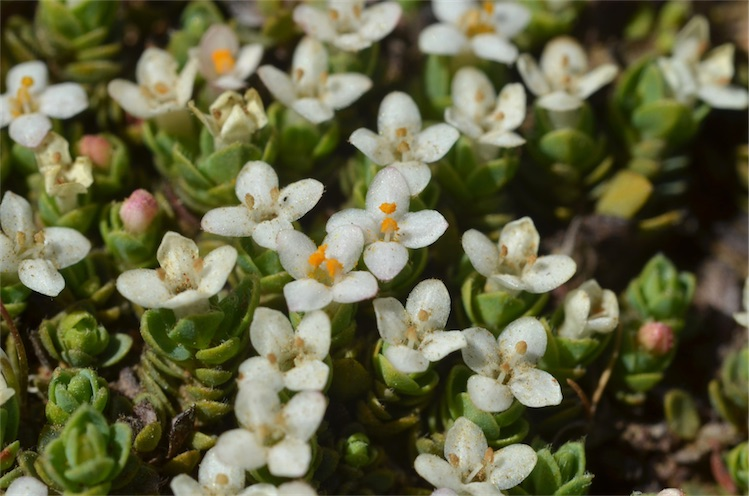
- Near Little Pine Lagoon, Tasmania

Scientific classification
- Kingdom: Plantae
- Clade: Tracheophytes
- Clade: Angiosperms
- Clade: Eudicots
- Clade: Rosids
- Order: Malvales
- Family: Thymelaeaceae
- Genus: Pimelea
- Species: P. pygmaea

Binomial name
- Pimelea pygmaea F.Muell. & C.Stuart ex Meisn.

Synonyms
- Banksia pygmaea (F.Muell. & C.Stuart ex Meisn.) Kuntze

= Pimelea pygmaea =

Species of flowering plant

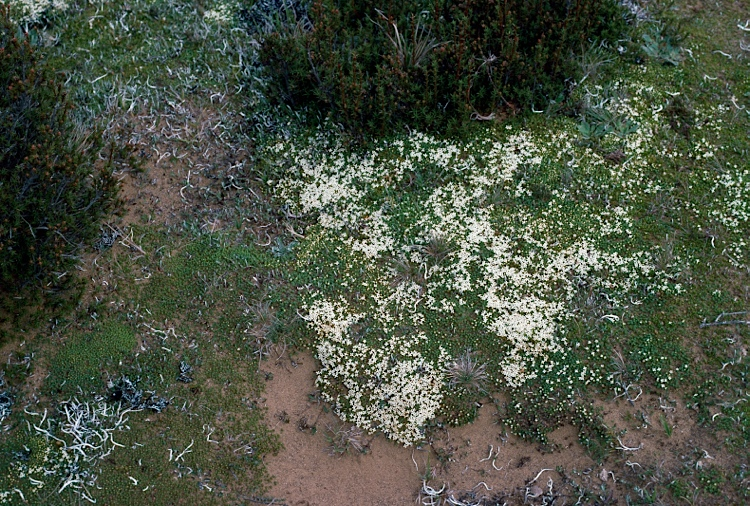
Habit

Pimelea pygmaea is a species of flowering plant in the family Thymelaeaceae and is endemic to Tasmania. It is a prostrate, cushion-like undershrub with narrowly oblong to elliptic leaves arranged in opposite pairs, and white flowers arranged singly on the ends of the many branches.

== Description ==
Pimelea pygmaea is a prostrate, cushion-like undershrub that typically grows to a height of 2–10 cm (0.79–3.94 in) and has many branches and hairy young stems. The leaves are arranged in opposite pairs, narrowly oblong to elliptic, 1.5–4 mm (0.059–0.157 in) long, 1–2 mm (0.039–0.079 in) wide and sessile. The flowers are white, female or bisexual and arranged singly on the ends of branches on a hairy pedicel. Bisexual flowers have a floral tube 2.2–3.0 mm (0.087–0.118 in) long and sepals up to 2 mm (0.079 in) long, and female flowers have a floral tube 1.5–1.7 mm (0.059–0.067 in) long and sepals 1.2–1.4 mm (0.047–0.055 in) long. Flowering occurs from September to December.

== Taxonomy ==
Pimelea pygmaea was first formally described in 1854 by Carl Meissner in the journal Linnaea, from an unpublished description by Ferdinand von Mueller and Charles Stuart. The specific epithet (pygmaea) means "dwarf".

== Distribution and habitat ==
This pimelea grows in alpine and subalpine moorland at altitudes above 1,000 m (3,300 ft) on the Central Plateau Conservation Area in Tasmania.
