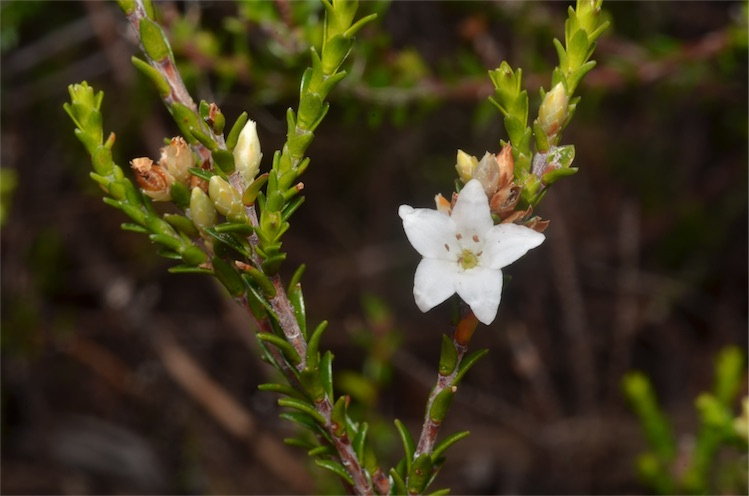
- In the Royal Tasmanian Botanical Gardens

Scientific classification
- Kingdom: Plantae
- Clade: Tracheophytes
- Clade: Angiosperms
- Clade: Eudicots
- Clade: Asterids
- Order: Ericales
- Family: Ericaceae
- Genus: Epacris
- Species: E. petrophila

Binomial name
- Epacris petrophila Hook.f.

Synonyms
- Epacris microphylla Hook.f. nom. illeg.

= Epacris petrophila =

Species of plant

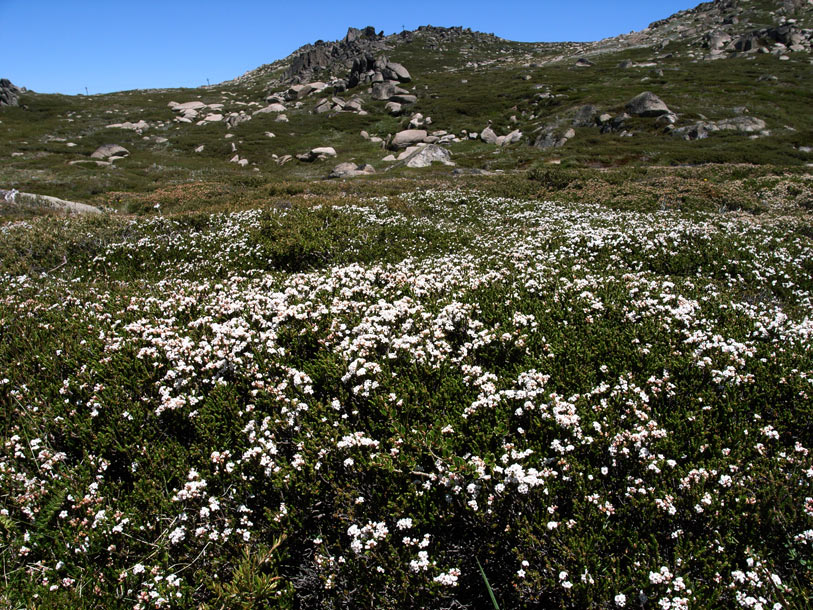
Habit near Thredbo

Epacris petrophila, commonly known as snow heath, is a species of flowering plant from the heath family, Ericaceae, and is endemic to south-eastern Australia. It is an erect, bushy, sometimes low-lying shrub with egg-shaped to elliptic leaves and tube-shaped white flowers in small clusters on the ends of branches.

== Description ==
Epacris petrophila is an erect, bushy, sometimes low-lying shrub that typically grows to a height of 30–80 cm (12–31 in) and has softly-hairy branchlets. Its leaves are erect, elliptic or egg-shaped, sometimes with the narrower end towards the base, 1.1–3.3 mm (0.043–0.130 in) long and 0.7–1.7 mm (0.028–0.067 in) wide 0.1–0.2 mm (0.0039–0.0079 in) long, and with minute teeth on the edges. The flowers are borne in clusters up to 10 mm (0.39 in) long on the ends of branches and are more or less sessile with 8 to 10 bracts at the base. The sepals are egg-shaped, 2–3 mm (0.079–0.118 in) long and the petals are white, joined at the base to form a bell-shaped tube 1.3–2.0 mm (0.051–0.079 in) long with lobes 1.4–2.5 mm (0.055–0.098 in) long. Flowering occurs from December to February and the fruit is a capsule about 1.5 mm (0.059 in) long.

== Taxonomy ==
Epacris petrophila was first formally described in 1857 by Joseph Dalton Hooker in The botany of the Antarctic voyage of H.M. Discovery ships Erebus and Terror. III. Flora Tasmaniae from specimens collected by Ronald Campbell Gunn. The specific epithet (petrophila) means "rock-loving".

== Distribution and habitat ==
Snow heath grows in the alpine and subalpine feldmark, heath and bog in New South Wales and the Australian Capital Territory south from Mount Kosciuszko, in a few locations in Victoria and in Tasmania where it is common on the Central Plateau.

== Ecology ==
The seeds of E. petrophila weigh about 0.02 g (0.00071 oz) and are only 0.5 mm (0.020 in) long, suggesting dispersal by wind or water, or in mud adhering to the feet of birds.

The seed of Epacris petrophila was featured on the $1 postage stamp issued on 8 October 2019 by Australia Post. The stamp issue was one of three stamps, each featuring the seeds of threatened Australian plant species, recognising the work of the Australian Seed Bank Partnership.
