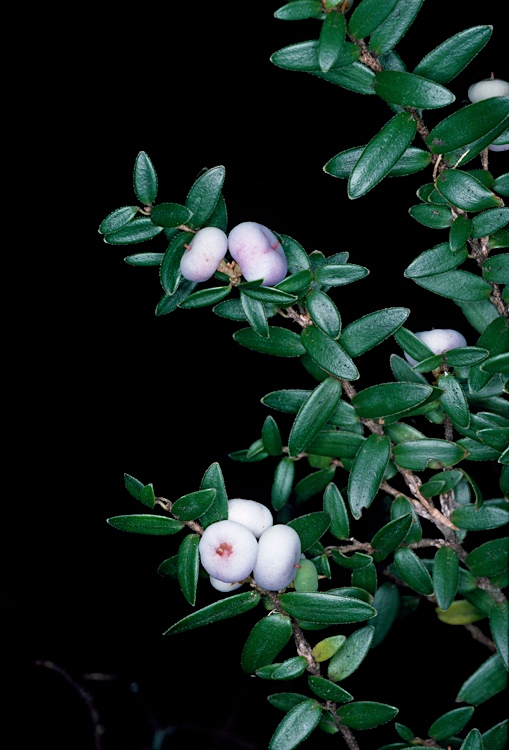
- In Mt. Field National Park

Scientific classification
- Kingdom: Plantae
- Clade: Tracheophytes
- Clade: Angiosperms
- Clade: Eudicots
- Clade: Asterids
- Order: Ericales
- Family: Ericaceae
- Genus: Trochocarpa
- Species: T. gunnii

Binomial name
- Trochocarpa gunnii (Hook.f.) Benth.

= Trochocarpa gunnii =

Species of plant

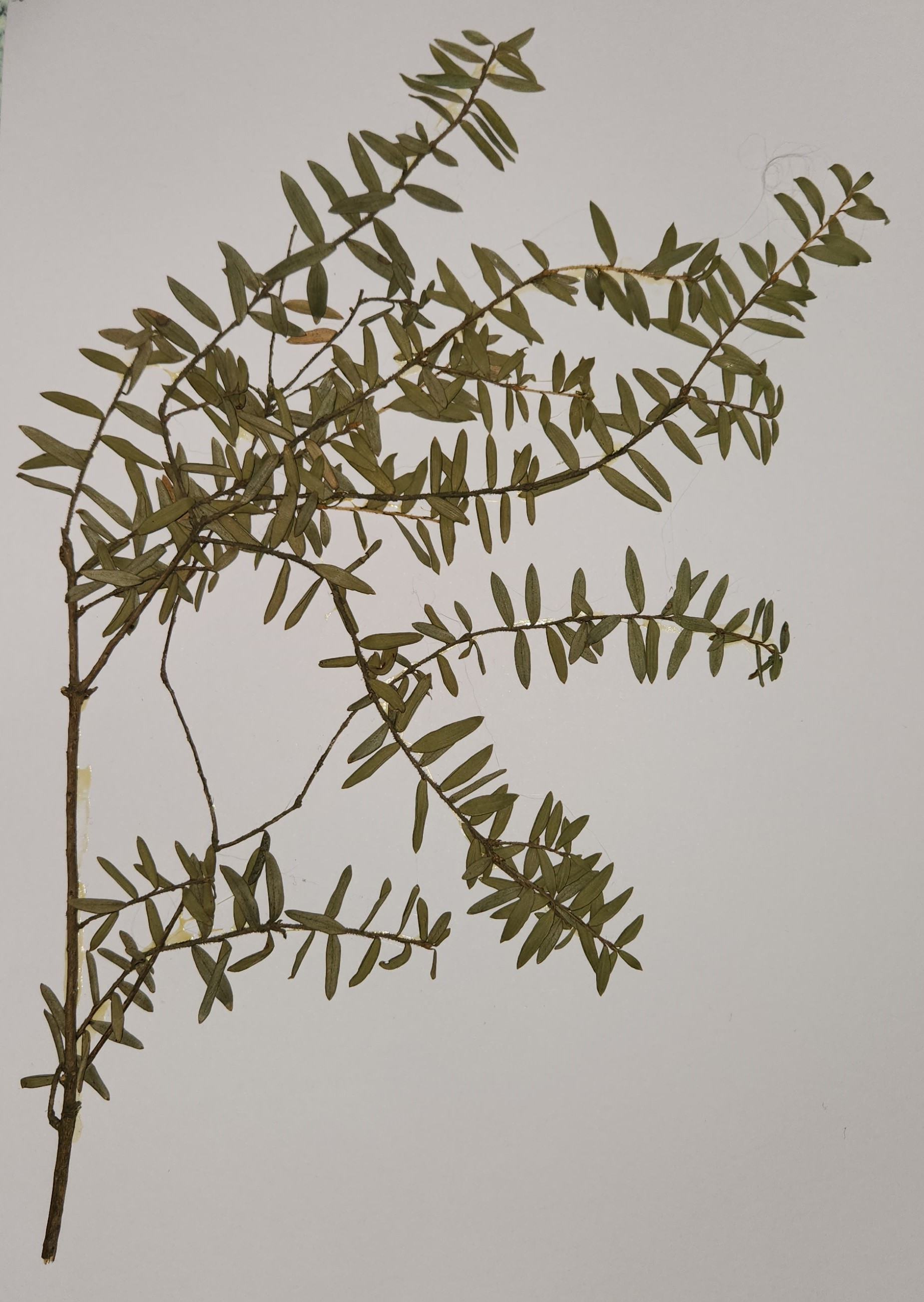
Trochocarpa gunnii leaves.

Trochocarpa gunnii is a species of flowering plant of the family Ericaceae and is endemic to Tasmania. It is a common, tall, rainforest understorey shrub with broadly oblong leaves and small, dense spikes of white, sometimes pink or red, glabrous flowers and purple to orange drupes.

== Description ==
Trochocarpa gunnii is a common, rainforest understorey shrub that typically grows to a height of about 2–4 m (6 ft 7 in – 13 ft 1 in) and has many branches. The leaves are arranged alternately along the branches, so that the shoot appears flattened. The leaves are oval to oblong, usually 6–9 mm (0.24–0.35 in) long with 3 to 5 ribs on the lower, lighter surface. The flowers are borne in short, almost spherical spikes on the ends of branches or on the previous year's growth with bracts and bracteoles about half as long as the sepals, the sepals about 1.6 mm (0.063 in) long. The petals are white, pink or red and glabrous, joined at the base to for a bell-shaped tube 3.2 mm (0.13 in) long and longer than the sepals, the petal-lobe short. The fruits is a fleshy, purple to orange drupe about 8 mm (0.31 in) in diameter.

== Taxonomy ==
This species was first formally described in 1847 by Joseph Dalton Hooker who gave it the name Decaspora gunnii in William Jackson Hooker's The London journal of botany, from specimens collected in the "Hampshire Hills" by Ronald Campbell Gunn. In 1868, George Bentham transferred the species to Trochocarpa as T. gunnii in his Flora Australiensis." The specific epithet (gunnii), honours the collector of the type collection.

This species can be confused with Trochocarpa cunninghamii, which is a low growing, scrambling shrub with red flowers, and is more commonly found at high altitudes. The rainforest Archeria species (A. eriocarpa and A. hirtella) also have similar foliage to T. gunnii, however these species only have one vein on the underside of the leaf.

== Distribution and habitat ==
Trochocarpa gunnii is endemic to Tasmania and is found in rainforests and sub-alpine areas of the state.

== Phylogeny ==
The closest relatives of Trochocarpa gunnii appear to be Monotoca scoparia and Montitega dealbata, both of which occur in Tasmania. M. scoparia is endemic to Australia and is found in many parts of the South East of the country, while M. dealbata is endemic to Tasmania.
