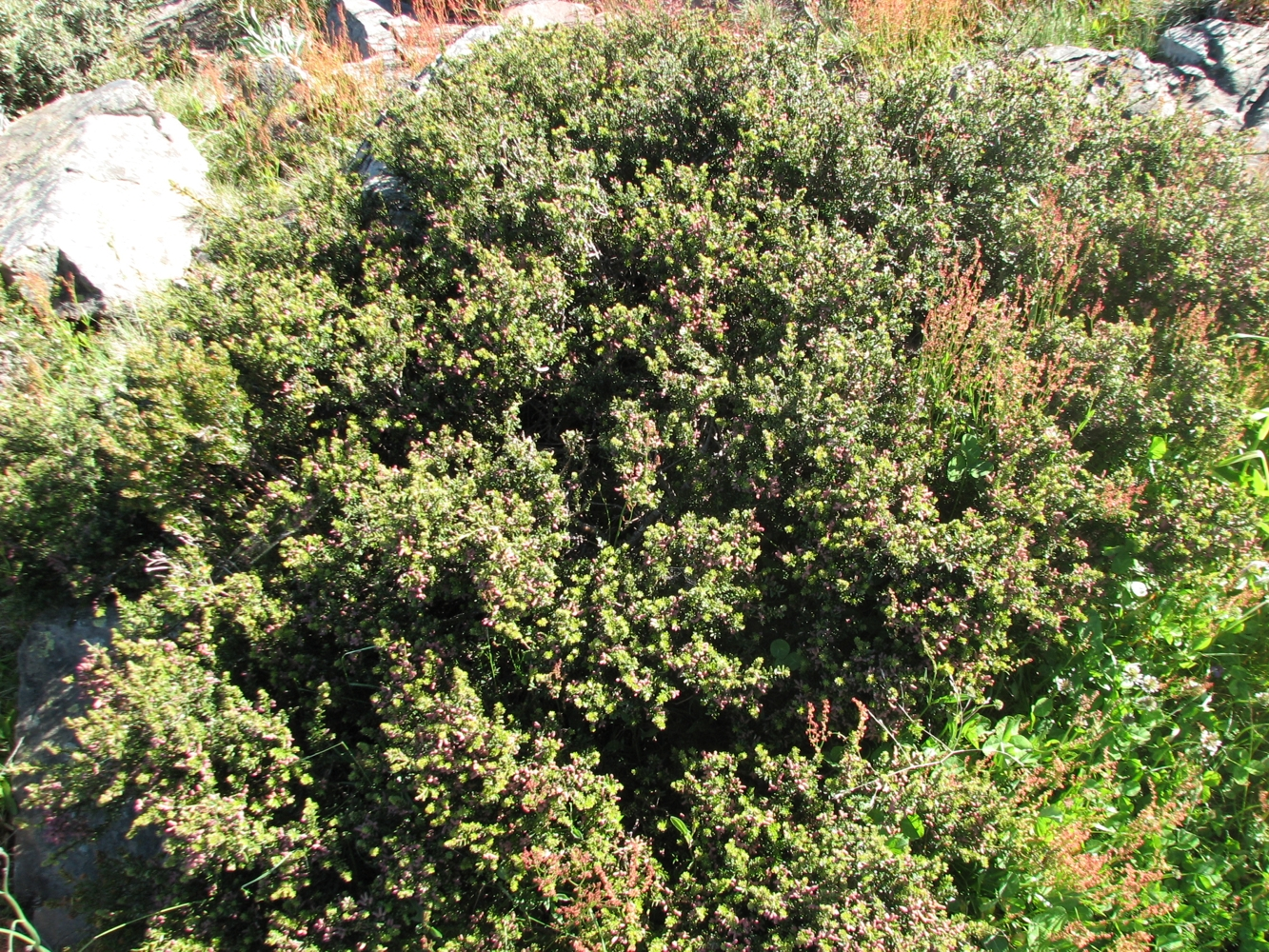
- Podocarpus lawrencei, Mt Buller

Conservation status
- Least Concern (IUCN 3.1)

Scientific classification
- Kingdom: Plantae
- Clade: Tracheophytes
- Clade: Gymnosperms
- Division: Pinophyta
- Class: Pinopsida
- Order: Araucariales
- Family: Podocarpaceae
- Genus: Podocarpus
- Species: P. lawrencei

Binomial name
- Podocarpus lawrencei Hook.f.

Synonyms
- Podocarpus alpinus R.Br. ex Hook.f.

= Podocarpus lawrencei =

Species of conifer

Podocarpus lawrencei, the Errinundra plum-pine, or the mountain plum-pine, is a species of conifer in the family Podocarpaceae, native throughout the Australian high country, from southern Tasmania through to the New South Wales highlands. It grows on exposed sites to 1,800 m, often forming living carpets over rocks through wind pruning.

Mountain plum-pine can live up to 600 years, and the growth rings vary with the temperature of the growing season, with narrower rings indicating unusually snowy years. These factors make it useful for determining past climate conditions in the Australian Alps.

== Description ==
The leaves are 1 cm long and 2–3 mm broad, green, often reddish-tinted, particularly so in cold winter weather. It has small bright red berry-like cones, with a 5–10 mm long red aril and one (rarely two) apical seeds 6–8 mm long; they are eaten by birds and marsupials, but are toxic to most other mammals (including humans).

Whilst it is normally low growing, rarely reaching more than 1 m in the Australian Alps, on the Errinundra Plateau in eastern Victoria it reaches 15 m in height. The timber is too rare to be used for woodcrafts.

== Cultivation ==
Mountain plum-pine is tolerant of quite dry conditions and can resprout after losing all its leaves from drought. It survives −16 °C to 45 °C and grows well in full sun or fairly heavy shade. It is slow growing, putting on about 3–5 cm of length each year. It can be grown from cuttings or seed. New foliage is usually a lime green, darkening to olive green as it hardens.

As a house plant, the mountain plum-pine should be grown in full sunlight with plenty of water, and can be cultivated as an indoor plant in a bright window. It can be grown as a bonsai or hedging plant.
