= List of fern families =

Below are lists of extant fern families and subfamilies using the classification scheme proposed by the Pteridophyte Phylogeny Group in 2016 (PPG I). The scheme is based on molecular phylogenetic studies, and also draws on earlier classifications, particularly those by Smith et al. (2006), Chase and Reveal (2009), and Christenhusz et al. (2011). It rejects the very broad circumscription The system used by Christenhusz and Chase (2014) gives a much broader circumscription than PPG I to four families (Schizaeaceae, Cyatheaceae, Aspleniaceae and Polypodiaceae); the scope of those families in the Christenhusz and Chase system is indicated in parentheses after the name used in PPG I for the same circumscription.

== Systematic order ==
- Class Polypodiopsida Cronquist, Takht. & W.Zimm. (ferns, including horsetails)

- Subclass Equisetidae Warm. (horsetails and scouring-rushes)

- Order Equisetales DC. ex Bercht. & J.Presl

- Family Equisetaceae Michx. ex DC

- Subclass Ophioglossidae Klinge (whisk ferns, adder's-tongues and moonworts)

- Order Psilotales Prant

- Family Psilotaceae J.W.Griff. & Henfr.

- Order Ophioglossales Link

- Family Ophioglossaceae Martinov

- Subfamily Helminthostachyoideae C.Presl
- Subfamily Mankyuoideae J.R.Grant & B.Dauphin
- Subfamily Ophioglossoideae C.Presl
- Subfamily Botrychioideae C.Presl

- Subclass Marattiidae Klinge (marattioid ferns)

- Order Marattiales Link

- Family Marattiaceae Kaulf

- Subclass Polypodiidae Cronquist, Takht. & W.Zimm. (leptosporangiate ferns)

- Order Osmundales Link (royal ferns)

- Family Osmundaceae Martinov

- Order Hymenophyllales A.B.Frank (filmy ferns and bristle ferns)

- Family Hymenophyllaceae Mart

- Subfamily Trichomanoideae C.Presl
- Subfamily Hymenophylloideae Burnett

- Order Gleicheniales Schimp

- Family Matoniaceae C.Pres
- Family Dipteridaceae Seward & E.Dale
- Family Gleicheniaceae C.Presl

- Order Schizaeales Schimp. (Schizaeaceae sensu Christenhusz & Chase)

- Family Lygodiaceae M.Roem
- Family Schizaeaceae Kaulf
- Family Anemiaceae Link

- Order Salviniales Link

- Family Salviniaceae Martinov
- Family Marsileaceae Mirb.

- Order Cyatheales A.B.Frank (Cyatheaceae sensu Christenhusz & Chase) (tree ferns)

- Family Thyrsopteridaceae C.Presl
- Family Loxsomataceae C.Presl
- Family Culcitaceae Pic.Serm
- Family Plagiogyriaceae Bowe
- Family Cibotiaceae Koral
- Family Metaxyaceae Pic.Serm.
- Family Dicksoniaceae M.R.Schomb.
- Family Cyatheaceae Kaulf.

- Order Polypodiales Link

- Suborder Saccolomatineae Hovenkamp

- Family Saccolomataceae Doweld

- Suborder Lindsaeineae Lehtonen & Tuomist

- Family Cystodiaceae J.R.Croft
- Family Lonchitidaceae Doweld
- Family Lindsaeaceae C.Presl ex M.R.Schomb.

- Suborder Pteridineae J.Prado & Schuettp

- Family Pteridaceae E.D.M.Kirchn.

- Subfamily Parkerioideae Burnett
- Subfamily Cryptogrammoideae S.Lindsay
- Subfamily Pteridoideae Link
- Subfamily Vittarioideae Link
- Subfamily Cheilanthoideae Horvat

- Suborder Dennstaedtiineae Schwartsb. & Hovenkamp

- Family Dennstaedtiaceae Lotsy

- Suborder Aspleniineae H.Schneid. & C.J.Rothf. (Aspleniaceae sensu Christenhusz & Chase)

- Family Cystopteridaceae Shmakov
- Family Rhachidosoraceae X.C.Zhang
- Family Diplaziopsidaceae X.C.Zhang & Christenh.
- Family Desmophlebiaceae Mynssen
- Family Hemidictyaceae Christenh. & H.Schneid.
- Family Aspleniaceae Newman
- Family Woodsiaceae Herter
- Family Onocleaceae Pic.Serm.
- Family Blechnaceae Newman

- Subfamily Stenochlaenoideae (Ching) J.P.Roux
- Subfamily Woodwardioideae Gasper
- Subfamily Blechnoideae Gasper, V.A.O.Dittrich & Salino

- Family Athyriaceae Alston
- Family Thelypteridaceae Ching ex Pic.Serm.

- Subfamily Phegopteridoideae Salino, A.R.Sm. & T.E.Almeid
- Subfamily Thelypteridoideae C.F.Reed

- Suborder Polypodiineae Dumort. (Polypodiaceae sensu Christenhusz & Chase)

- Family Didymochlaenaceae Ching ex Li Bing Zhang & Liang Zhang
- Family Hypodematiaceae Ching
- Family Dryopteridaceae Herter

- Subfamily Polybotryoideae H.M.Liu & X.C.Zhang
- Subfamily Elaphoglossoideae (Pic.Serm.) Crabbe, Jermy & Mickel
- Subfamily Dryopteridoideae Link
- 2 genera unassigned to a subfamily

- Family Nephrolepidaceae Pic.Serm.
- Family Lomariopsidaceae Alston
- Family Tectariaceae Panigrahi
- Family Oleandraceae Ching ex Pic.Serm.
- Family Davalliaceae M.R.Schomb.
- Family Polypodiaceae J.Presl & C.Presl

- Subfamily Loxogrammoideae H.Schneid.
- Subfamily Platycerioideae B.K.Nayar
- Subfamily Drynarioideae Crabbe, Jermy & Mickel
- Subfamily Microsoroideae B.K.Nayar
- Subfamily Polypodioideae Sweet
- Subfamily Grammitidoideae Parris & Sundue
- 1 genus unassigned to a subfamily

== Alphabetic order ==
- Anemiaceae Link (1 genus)
- Aspleniaceae Newman (2 genera)
- Athyriaceae Alston (3 genera)
- Blechnaceae Newman (24 genera)
- Cibotiaceae Koral (1 genus)
- Culcitaceae Pic.Serm (1 genus)
- Cyatheaceae Kaulf. (3 genera)
- Cystodiaceae J.R.Croft (1 genus)
- Cystopteridaceae Shmakov (3 genera)
- Davalliaceae M.R.Schomb. (1 genus)
- Dennstaedtiaceae Lotsy (10 genera)
- Desmophlebiaceae Mynssen (1 genus)
- Dicksoniaceae M.R.Schomb. (3 genera)
- Didymochlaenaceae Ching ex Li Bing Zhang & Liang Zhang (1 genus)
- Diplaziopsidaceae X.C.Zhang & Christenh. (2 genera)
- Dipteridaceae Seward & E.Dale (2 genera)
- Dryopteridaceae Herter (26 genera)
- Equisetaceae Michx. ex DC (1 genus)
- Gleicheniaceae C.Presl (6 genera)
- Hemidictyaceae Christenh. & H.Schneid. (1 genus)
- Hymenophyllaceae Mart (9 genera)
- Hypodematiaceae Ching (2 genera)
- Lindsaeaceae C.Presl ex M.R.Schomb. (7 genera)
- Lomariopsidaceae Alston (4 genera)
- Lonchitidaceae Doweld (1 genus)
- Loxsomataceae C.Presl (2 genera)
- Lygodiaceae M.Roem (1 genus)
- Marattiaceae Kaulf (6 genera)
- Marsileaceae Mirb. (3 genera)
- Matoniaceae C.Pres (2 genera)
- Metaxyaceae Pic.Serm. (1 genus)
- Nephrolepidaceae Pic.Serm. (1 genus)
- Oleandraceae Ching ex Pic.Serm. (1 genus)
- Onocleaceae Pic.Serm. (4 genera)
- Ophioglossaceae Martinov (10 genera)
- Osmundaceae Martinov (6 genera)
- Plagiogyriaceae Bowe (1 genus)
- Polypodiaceae J.Presl & C.Presl (65 genera)
- Psilotaceae J.W.Griff. & Henfr. (2 genera)
- Pteridaceae E.D.M.Kirchn. (53 genera)
- Rhachidosoraceae X.C.Zhang (1 genus)
- Saccolomataceae Doweld (1 genus)
- Salviniaceae Martinov (2 genera)
- Schizaeaceae Kaulf (2 genera)
- Tectariaceae Panigrahi (7 genera)
- Thelypteridaceae Ching ex Pic.Serm. (30 genera)
- Thyrsopteridaceae C.Presl (1 genus)
- Woodsiaceae Herter (1 genus)

== See also ==
- List of ferns of Georgia (U.S. state)
