= Ceradenia =

Scientific classification
- Kingdom: Plantae
- Clade: Tracheophytes
- Division: Polypodiophyta
- Class: Polypodiopsida
- Order: Polypodiales
- Suborder: Polypodiineae
- Family: Polypodiaceae
- Subfamily: Grammitidoideae
- Genus: Ceradenia; L.E.Bishop

Type species
- Ceradenia curvata (Sw.) L.E.Bishop

Genus of ferns

Ceradenia is a genus of ferns in the family Polypodiaceae, subfamily Grammitidoideae, according to the Pteridophyte Phylogeny Group classification of 2016 (PPG I).

== Species ==
As of April 2025, the Checklist of Ferns and Lycophytes of the World accepted the following seventy-seven species:

- Ceradenia albidula (Baker) L.E.Bishop
- Ceradenia argyrata (Bory ex Willd.) Parris
- Ceradenia arthrothrix L.E.Bishop & A.R.Sm.
- Ceradenia asthenophylla L.E.Bishop ex A.R.Sm.
- Ceradenia aulaeifolia L.E.Bishop ex A.R.Sm.
- Ceradenia auroseiomena L.E.Bishop
- Ceradenia ayopayana M.Kessler & A.R.Sm.
- Ceradenia bishopii (Stolze) A.R.Sm.
- Ceradenia brunneoviridis (Baker ex Jenman) L.E.Bishop
- Ceradenia capillaris (Desv.) L.E.Bishop
- Ceradenia clavipila L.E.Bishop ex M.Kessler & A.R.Sm.
- Ceradenia comorensis (Baker) Parris
- Ceradenia comosa L.E.Bishop
- Ceradenia congesta (Copel.) L.E.Bishop ex A.R.Sm.
- Ceradenia curvata (Sw.) L.E.Bishop
- Ceradenia deltodon (Baker) Parris
- Ceradenia dendrodoxa L.E.Bishop
- Ceradenia discolor (Hook.) L.E.Bishop
- Ceradenia farinosa (Hook.) L.E.Bishop
- Ceradenia fendleri (Copel.) L.E.Bishop
- Ceradenia fragillima (Copel.) L.E.Bishop
- Ceradenia fucoides (Christ) L.E.Bishop
- Ceradenia gameriana (Vareschi) Mostacero
- Ceradenia glabra M.Kessler & A.R.Sm.
- Ceradenia glaziovii (Baker) Labiak
- Ceradenia herrerae (Copel.) L.E.Bishop
- Ceradenia intonsa L.E.Bishop ex León-Parra & Mostacero
- Ceradenia intricata (C.V.Morton) L.E.Bishop ex A.R.Sm.
- Ceradenia itatiaiensis Labiak & Condack
- Ceradenia ivohibensis Rakotondr. & Parris
- Ceradenia jimenezii M.Kessler & A.R.Sm.
- Ceradenia jungermannioides (Klotzsch) L.E.Bishop
- Ceradenia kalawayae M.Kessler & A.R.Sm.
- Ceradenia kalbreyeri (Baker) L.E.Bishop
- Ceradenia kegeliana (Kunze) comb. ined.
- Ceradenia knightii (Copel.) L.E.Bishop
- Ceradenia kookenamae (Jenman) L.E.Bishop
- Ceradenia leucosora (Bojer ex Hook.) Parris
- Ceradenia longipinnata (Copel.) L.E.Bishop
- Ceradenia maackii Labiak & J.B.S.Pereira
- Ceradenia madidiensis M.Kessler & A.R.Sm.
- Ceradenia margaritata (A.R.Sm.) L.E.Bishop
- Ceradenia marginalis León-Parra
- Ceradenia marialta L.E.Bishop ex León-Parra
- Ceradenia maxoniana L.E.Bishop
- Ceradenia mayoris (Rosenst.) L.E.Bishop
- Ceradenia melanopus (Hook. & Grev.) L.E.Bishop
- Ceradenia meridensis (Klotzsch) L.E.Bishop
- Ceradenia microcystis L.E.Bishop & A.R.Sm.
- Ceradenia mirabilis L.E.Bishop
- Ceradenia narinensis León-Parra
- Ceradenia nubigena (Maxon) L.E.Bishop
- Ceradenia nudicarpa (Copel.) L.E.Bishop
- Ceradenia oidiophora (Mickel & Beitel) A.R.Sm.
- Ceradenia pearcei (Baker) L.E.Bishop
- Ceradenia phalacron (Stolze) A.R.Sm.
- Ceradenia phloiocharis L.E.Bishop
- Ceradenia pilipalaea M.Kessler & A.R.Sm.
- Ceradenia pilipecten L.E.Bishop ex M.Kessler & A.R.Sm.
- Ceradenia pilipes (Hook.) L.E.Bishop
- Ceradenia podocarpa (Maxon) L.E.Bishop
- Ceradenia praeclara L.E.Bishop
- Ceradenia pruinosa (Maxon) L.E.Bishop
- Ceradenia pseudodevoluta Rakotondr. & Parris
- Ceradenia sacksii Sundue
- Ceradenia sechellarum (Baker) Parris
- Ceradenia semiadnata (Hook.) L.E.Bishop
- Ceradenia setosa M.Kessler & A.R.Sm.
- Ceradenia similis M.Kessler & A.R.Sm.
- Ceradenia spectabilis Sundue
- Ceradenia spixiana (M.Martens ex Mett.) L.E.Bishop
- Ceradenia terrestris L.E.Bishop
- Ceradenia tristis A.R.Sm.
- Ceradenia tryonorum B.León & A.R.Sm.
- Ceradenia tunquiniensis M.Kessler & A.R.Sm.
- Ceradenia warmingii (C.Chr.) Labiak
- Ceradenia werffii (L.E.Bishop) A.R.Sm. & M.Kessler
