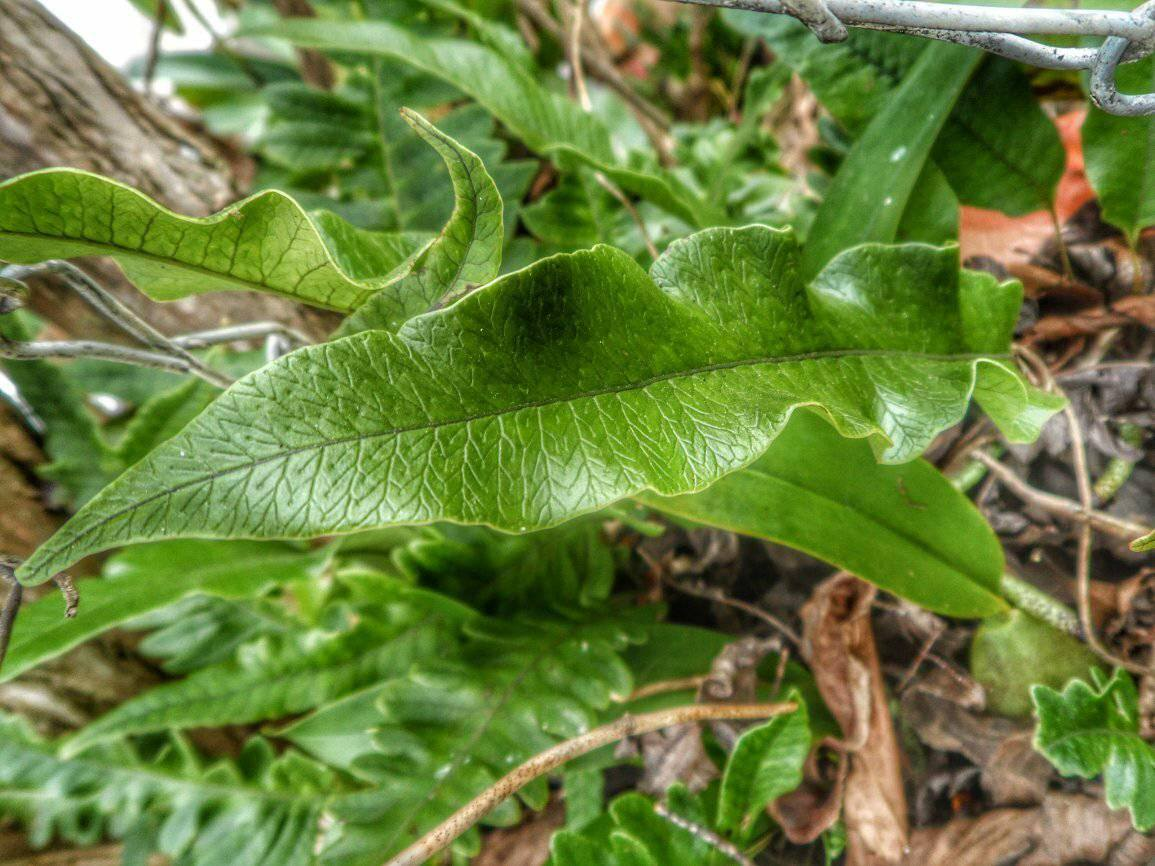
- Serpocaulon levigatum

Scientific classification
- Kingdom: Plantae
- Clade: Tracheophytes
- Division: Polypodiophyta
- Class: Polypodiopsida
- Order: Polypodiales
- Suborder: Polypodiineae
- Family: Polypodiaceae
- Subfamily: Polypodioideae
- Genus: Serpocaulon; A.R.Sm.

Species
- See text.

= Serpocaulon =

Genus of ferns

Serpocaulon is a genus of ferns in the family Polypodiaceae, subfamily Polypodioideae, according to the Pteridophyte Phylogeny Group classification of 2016 (PPG I). The genus is native to Northern and Southern America.

== Species ==
As of April 2025, the Checklist of Ferns and Lycophytes of the World accepted the following thirty-seven species:

- Serpocaulon adnatum (Kunze ex Klotzsch) A.R.Sm.
- Serpocaulon antioquianum D.Sanín
- Serpocaulon appressum (Copel.) A.R.Sm.
- Serpocaulon attenuatum (C.Presl) A.R.Sm.
- Serpocaulon australe D.Sanín, J.C.Ospina, I.O.Moura & Salino
- Serpocaulon caceresii (Sodiro) A.R.Sm.
- Serpocaulon catharinae (Langsd. & Fisch.) A.R.Sm.
- Serpocaulon concolorum (M.Kessler & A.R.Sm.) A.R.Sm.
- Serpocaulon crystalloneuron (Rosenst.) A.R.Sm.
- Serpocaulon dasypleuron (Kunze) A.R.Sm.
- Serpocaulon demissum (Fée) D.Sanín
- Serpocaulon dissimile (L.) A.R.Sm.
- Serpocaulon eleutherophlebium (Fée) A.R.Sm.
- Serpocaulon falcaria (Kunze) A.R.Sm.
- Serpocaulon fraxinifolium (Jacq.) A.R.Sm.
- Serpocaulon funckii (Mett.) A.R.Sm.
- Serpocaulon glandulosissimum (Brade) Labiak & J.Prado
- Serpocaulon intricatum (M.Kessler & A.R.Sm.) A.R.Sm.
- Serpocaulon lasiopus (Klotzsch) A.R.Sm.
- Serpocaulon latipes (Langsd. & L.Fisch.) A.R.Sm.
- Serpocaulon latissimum (R.C.Moran & B. Øllg.) A.R.Sm.
- Serpocaulon levigatum (Cav.) A.R.Sm.
- Serpocaulon loriceum (L.) A.R.Sm.
- Serpocaulon × manizalense D.Sanín & Torrez
- Serpocaulon maritimum (Hieron.) A.R.Sm.
- Serpocaulon menisciifolium (Langsd. & Fisch.) A.R.Sm.
- Serpocaulon nanegalense (Sodiro) A.R.Sm.
- Serpocaulon × orosiense A.Rojas
- Serpocaulon patentissimum (Mett. ex Kuhn) A.R.Sm.
- Serpocaulon polystichum (Link) A.R.Sm.
- Serpocaulon psychotrium Mostacero, D.Sanín & A.R.Sm.
- Serpocaulon ptilorhizon (Christ) A.R.Sm.
- Serpocaulon × pubescens (Rosenst.) Schwartsb. & A.R.Sm.
- Serpocaulon rex Schwartsb. & A.R.Sm.
- Serpocaulon richardii (Klotzsch) A.R.Sm.
- Serpocaulon × rojasianum J.M.Chaves, R.C.Moran & F.Oviedo
- Serpocaulon × semipinnatifidum (Fée) A.R.Sm.
- Serpocaulon sessilifolium (Desv.) A.R.Sm.
- Serpocaulon × sessilipinnum A.Rojas & J.M.Chaves
- Serpocaulon silvulae (M.Kessler & A.R.Sm.) A.R.Sm.
- Serpocaulon subandinum (Sodiro) A.R.Sm.
- Serpocaulon × tabuleirense D.Sanín & Salino
- Serpocaulon triseriale (Sw.) A.R.Sm.
- Serpocaulon vacillans (Link) A.R.Sm.
- Serpocaulon wagneri (Mett.) A.R.Sm.
