= Oleandra hainanensis =

Conservation status
- Endangered (IUCN 3.1)

Scientific classification
- Kingdom: Plantae
- Clade: Tracheophytes
- Division: Polypodiophyta
- Class: Polypodiopsida
- Order: Polypodiales
- Suborder: Polypodiineae
- Family: Oleandraceae
- Genus: Oleandra
- Species: O. hainanensis

Binomial name
- Oleandra hainanensis Ching

Species of fern

Oleandra hainanensis is a species of fern in the family Oleandraceae. It is endemic to China. Its natural habitat is subtropical or tropical moist lowland forests. It is threatened by habitat loss.
