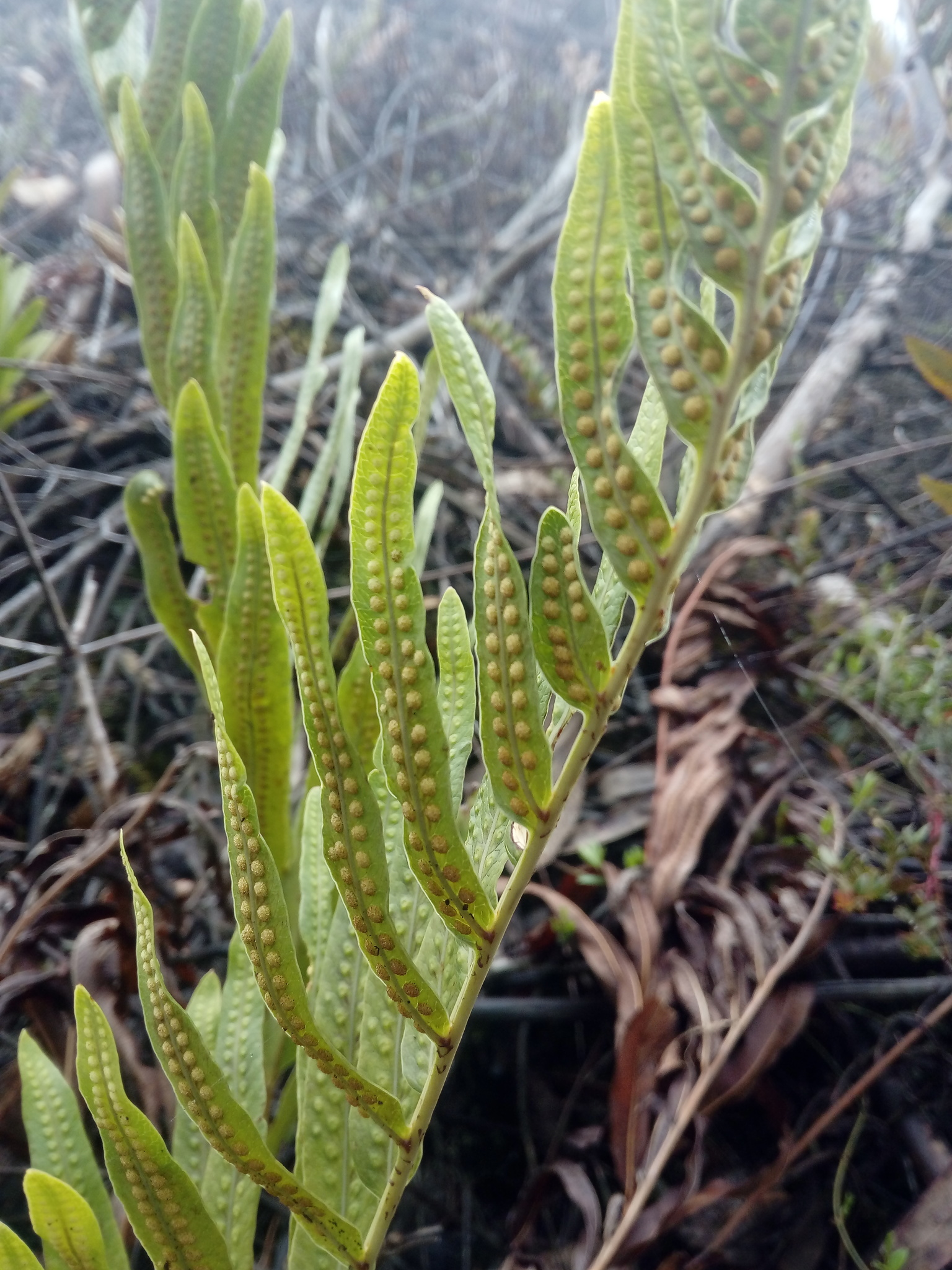

Scientific classification
- Kingdom: Plantae
- Clade: Tracheophytes
- Division: Polypodiophyta
- Class: Polypodiopsida
- Order: Polypodiales
- Suborder: Polypodiineae
- Family: Polypodiaceae
- Genus: Serpocaulon
- Species: S. sessilifolium

Binomial name
- Serpocaulon sessilifolium (Desv.) A.R.Sm.

Synonyms
- Goniophlebium cordatum (Kunze) Moore; Goniophlebium surucuchense (Hook.) Moore; Polypodium andinum H.Karst.; Polypodium cordatum Kunze; Polypodium kunzeanum C.Chr.; Polypodium pseudofraternum A.C.Sm.; Polypodium remotum Baker; Polypodium rimbachii Sodiro; Polypodium sessilifolium Desv.; Polypodium surucuchense Hook.; Polypodium uniseriale C.Chr.

= Serpocaulon sessilifolium =

Species of fern

Serpocaulon sessilifolium is a species of fern in the family Polypodiaceae. It is native to Costa Rica and northern and western South America (Colombia, Venezuela, Ecuador, Peru, Bolivia and Guyana). Under the synonym Polypodium rimbachii, it was regarded as endemic to Ecuador and threatened by habitat loss.
