= Serpocaulon lasiopus =

Scientific classification
- Kingdom: Plantae
- Clade: Tracheophytes
- Division: Polypodiophyta
- Class: Polypodiopsida
- Order: Polypodiales
- Suborder: Polypodiineae
- Family: Polypodiaceae
- Genus: Serpocaulon
- Species: S. lasiopus

Binomial name
- Serpocaulon lasiopus (Klotzsch) A.R.Sm.

Synonyms
- Goniophlebium grammatoides Fée; Goniophlebium lasiopus (Klotzsch) T.Moore; Polypodium argyrolepis Sodiro; Polypodium lasiopus Klotzsch

Species of fern

Serpocaulon lasiopus is a species of fern in the family Polypodiaceae. It is widespread in South America. Under the synonym Polypodium argyrolepis, it was regarded as endemic to Ecuador and threatened by habitat loss.
