= Ceradenia jungermannioides =

Conservation status
- Critically Endangered (IUCN 3.1)(Europe)

Scientific classification
- Kingdom: Plantae
- Clade: Tracheophytes
- Division: Polypodiophyta
- Class: Polypodiopsida
- Order: Polypodiales
- Suborder: Polypodiineae
- Family: Polypodiaceae
- Genus: Ceradenia
- Species: C. jungermannioides

Binomial name
- Ceradenia jungermannioides (Klotzsch) L. E. Bishop

Synonyms
- Polypodium fawcettii Baker; Polypodium dendricolum Jenman; Polypodium jungermannioides Klotzsch; Grammitis jungermannioides (Klotzsch) Ching; Polypodium sprucei var. furcativenosum Hieron.; Polypodium sprucei var. costaricense Christ

Species of fern

Ceradenia jungermannioides, the mossy finger fern, is a species of fern in the family Polypodiaceae indigenous to the Neotropical realm (in the Caribbean and the Amazon rainforest) and the Azores.
