= Serpocaulon fraxinifolium =

Scientific classification
- Kingdom: Plantae
- Clade: Tracheophytes
- Division: Polypodiophyta
- Class: Polypodiopsida
- Order: Polypodiales
- Suborder: Polypodiineae
- Family: Polypodiaceae
- Genus: Serpocaulon
- Species: S. fraxinifolium

Binomial name
- Serpocaulon fraxinifolium (Jacq.) A.R.Sm.

Synonyms
- Goniophlebium deflexum Moore & Houlston; Goniophlebium distans J.Sm.; Goniophlebium fraxinifolium (Jacq.) T.Moore; Goniophlebium ornatum (Klotzsch) Fée; Goniophlebium rhizocaulon (Willd.) C.Presl; Marginaria distans (J.Sm.) C.Presl; Polypodium cymatodes Kunze; Polypodium deflexum (Moore & Houlston) Lowe; Polypodium distans (J.Sm.) Raddi; Polypodium fluminense Vell.; Polypodium fraxinifolium Jacq.; Polypodium mutabile Kunze; Polypodium ornatum Klotzsch; Polypodium rhizocaulon Willd.; Polypodium scutulatum Sodiro

Species of fern

Serpocaulon fraxinifolium is a species of fern in the family Polypodiaceae. It is native to Mexico, Central and South America. Under the synonym Polypodium scutulatum , it was regarded as endemic to Ecuador and threatened by habitat loss.
