= Ceradenia melanopus =

Conservation status
- Vulnerable (IUCN 3.1)

Scientific classification
- Kingdom: Plantae
- Clade: Tracheophytes
- Division: Polypodiophyta
- Class: Polypodiopsida
- Order: Polypodiales
- Suborder: Polypodiineae
- Family: Polypodiaceae
- Genus: Ceradenia
- Species: C. melanopus

Binomial name
- Ceradenia melanopus (Grev. & Hook.) L.E.Bishop

Species of fern

Ceradenia melanopus is a species of grammitid fern. It is endemic to Ecuador. Its natural habitat is subtropical or tropical moist montane forests. It is threatened by habitat loss.
