= Serpocaulon eleutherophlebium =

Scientific classification
- Kingdom: Plantae
- Clade: Tracheophytes
- Division: Polypodiophyta
- Class: Polypodiopsida
- Order: Polypodiales
- Suborder: Polypodiineae
- Family: Polypodiaceae
- Genus: Serpocaulon
- Species: S. eleutherophlebium

Binomial name
- Serpocaulon eleutherophlebium (Fée) A.R.Sm.

Synonyms
- Goniophlebium chondrocheilon Fée; Goniophlebium eleutherophlebium Fée; Polypodium chondrocheilon (Fée) C.Chr.; Polypodium eleutherophlebium (Fée) Mett.; Polypodium mindense Sodiro; Polypodium vagans Mett.

Species of fern

Serpocaulon eleutherophlebium is a species of fern in the family Polypodiaceae. It is native to Costa Rica, Panama, Colombia, Ecuador and Venezuela. Under the synonym Polypodium mindense, it was regarded as endemic to Ecuador.
