= Serpocaulon latissimum =

Scientific classification
- Kingdom: Plantae
- Clade: Tracheophytes
- Division: Polypodiophyta
- Class: Polypodiopsida
- Order: Polypodiales
- Suborder: Polypodiineae
- Family: Polypodiaceae
- Genus: Serpocaulon
- Species: S. latissimum

Binomial name
- Serpocaulon latissimum (R.C.Moran & B.Øllg.) A.R.Sm.

Synonyms
- Polypodium latissimum R.C.Moran & B.Øllg.

Species of fern

Serpocaulon latissimum is a species of fern in the family Polypodiaceae. It is endemic to Ecuador. Its natural habitat is subtropical or tropical moist lowland forests. It is threatened by habitat loss.

== Sources ==
- Navarrete, H.; Pitman, N. (2003). "Polypodium latissimum". IUCN Red List of Threatened Species. 2003 e.T43726A10824414. doi:10.2305/IUCN.UK.2003.RLTS.T43726A10824414.en.
