= Loxsomopsis =

Loxsomopsis Temporal range: Cenomanian to Present

Scientific classification
- Kingdom: Plantae
- Clade: Tracheophytes
- Division: Polypodiophyta
- Class: Polypodiopsida
- Order: Cyatheales
- Family: Loxsomataceae
- Genus: Loxsomopsis; Christ
- Species: L. pearcei

Binomial name
- Loxsomopsis pearcei (Baker) Maxon

Species
- †Loxsomopsis minor

Synonyms
- (Species): Dennstaedtia pearcei (Baker) C.Chr.; Dicksonia pearcei Baker; Loxsomopsis costaricensis Christ; Loxsomopsis lehmannii Hieron.; Loxsomopsis lehmannii var. crespiana Bosco; Loxsomopsis lehmannii var. glabra Bosco; Loxsomopsis notabilis Sloss.

Genus of ferns

Loxsomopsis is a genus of ferns with a single extant described species, Loxsomopsis pearcei, found in eastern Central and South America, from Costa Rica to Ecuador. In the Pteridophyte Phylogeny Group classification of 2016 (PPG I), the genus is placed in the family Loxsomataceae. Other sources place it in an expanded family Cyatheaceae. 1 extinct species is found in the Late Cretaceous of Myanmar: Loxsomopsis minor
