= Pteridophyte Phylogeny Group =

Plant classification organization

The Pteridophyte Phylogeny Group (PPG) is an informal international group of systematic botanists who collaborate to agree on the classification of pteridophytes (lycophytes and ferns) that reflects knowledge about plant relationships discovered through phylogenetic studies. In 2016, the group published a classification for extant pteridophytes, termed "PPG I". The paper had 94 authors (26 principal and 68 additional). The classification was presented as a consensus classification supported by the community of fern taxonomists. Alternative classifications of ferns exist and are preferred by some.

== PPG I ==
A first classification, PPG I, was produced in 2016, covering only extant (living) pteridophytes. The classification was rank-based, using the ranks of class, subclass, order, suborder, family, subfamily and genus.

=== Phylogeny ===
The classification was based on a consensus phylogeny, shown below to the level of order.

- tracheophytes
  - Lycopodiopsida
    - Lycopodiales
    - - Isoëtales
      - Selaginellales
  - euphyllophytes
    - - Polypodiopsida
        - - Equisetidae
            Equisetales
        - - - Ophioglossidae
              - Psilotales
              - Ophioglossales
          - - Marattiidae
              Marattiales
            - Polypodiidae
              - Osmundales
              - - Hymenophyllales
                - - Gleicheniales
                  - - Schizaeales
                    - - Salviniales
                      - - Cyatheales
                        - Polypodiales
    - spermatophytes

The very large order Polypodiales was divided into two suborders, as well as families not placed in a suborder:

- Polypodiales
  - - Saccolomatineae
      Saccolomataceae
    - Lindsaeineae
  - - - Pteridineae
        Pteridaceae
    - - Dennstaedtiineae
        Dennstaedtiaceae
      - eupolypods
        - Suborder Aspleniineae (eupolypods II)
        - Suborder Polypodiineae (eupolypods I)

=== Classification to subfamily level ===
To the level of subfamily, the PPG I classification is as follows.

- Class Lycopodiopsida Bartl. (3 orders, 3 families, 18 genera)

- Order Lycopodiales DC. ex Bercht. & J.Presl (1 family, 16 genera)

- Family Lycopodiaceae P.Beauv. (16 genera)

- Subfamily Lycopodielloideae W.H.Wagner & Beitel ex B.Øllg. (4 genera)
- Subfamily Lycopodioideae W.H.Wagner & Beitel ex B. Øllg. (9 genera)
- Subfamily Huperzioideae W.H.Wagner & Beitel ex B. Øllg. (3 genera)

- Order Isoëtales Prantl (1 family, 1 genus)

- Family Isoëtaceae Dumort. (1 genus)

- Order Selaginellales Prantl (1 family, 1 genus)

- Family Selaginellaceae Willk (1 genus)

- Class Polypodiopsida Cronquist, Takht. & W.Zimm. (11 orders, 48 families, 319 genera)

- Subclass Equisetidae Warm. (1 order, 1 family, 1 genus)

- Order Equisetales DC. ex Bercht. & J.Presl (1 family, 1 genus)

- Family Equisetaceae Michx. ex DC (1 genus)

- Subclass Ophioglossidae Klinge (2 orders, 2 families, 12 genera)

- Order Psilotales Prant (1 family, 2 genera)

- Family Psilotaceae J.W.Griff. & Henfr. (2 genera)

- Order Ophioglossales Link (1 family, 10 genera)

- Family Ophioglossaceae Martinov (10 genera)

- Subfamily Helminthostachyoideae C.Presl (1 genus)
- Subfamily Mankyuoideae J.R.Grant & B.Dauphin (1 genus)
- Subfamily Ophioglossoideae C.Presl (4 genera)
- Subfamily Botrychioideae C.Presl (4 genera)

- Subclass Marattiidae Klinge (1 order, 1 family, 6 genera)

- Order Marattiales Link (1 family, 6 genera)

- Family Marattiaceae Kaulf (6 genera)

- Subclass Polypodiidae Cronquist, Takht. & W.Zimm. (7 orders, 44 families, 300 genera)

- Order Osmundales Link (1 family, 6 genera)

- Family Osmundaceae Martinov (6 genera)

- Order Hymenophyllales A.B.Frank (1 family, 9 genera)

- Family Hymenophyllaceae Mart (9 genera)

- Subfamily Trichomanoideae C.Presl (8 genera)
- Subfamily Hymenophylloideae Burnett (1 genus)

- Order Gleicheniales Schimp (3 families, 10 genera)

- Family Matoniaceae C.Pres (2 genera)
- Family Dipteridaceae Seward & E.Dale (2 genera)
- Family Gleicheniaceae C.Presl (6 genera)

- Order Schizaeales Schimp. (3 families, 4 genera)

- Family Lygodiaceae M.Roem (1 genus)
- Family Schizaeaceae Kaulf (2 genera)
- Family Anemiaceae Link (1 genus)

- Order Salviniales Link (2 families, 5 genera)

- Family Salviniaceae Martinov (2 genera)
- Family Marsileaceae Mirb. (3 genera)

- Order Cyatheales A.B.Frank (8 families, 13 genera)

- Family Thyrsopteridaceae C.Presl (1 genus)
- Family Loxsomataceae C.Presl (2 genera)
- Family Culcitaceae Pic.Serm (1 genus)
- Family Plagiogyriaceae Bowe (1 genus)
- Family Cibotiaceae Koral (1 genus)
- Family Metaxyaceae Pic.Serm. (1 genus)
- Family Dicksoniaceae M.R.Schomb. (3 genera)
- Family Cyatheaceae Kaulf. (3 genera)

- Order Polypodiales Link (26 families, 253 genera)

- Suborder Saccolomatineae Hovenkamp (1 family, 1 genus)

- Family Saccolomataceae Doweld (1 genus)

- Suborder Lindsaeineae Lehtonen & Tuomist (3 families, 9 genera)

- Family Cystodiaceae J.R.Croft (1 genus)
- Family Lonchitidaceae Doweld (1 genus)
- Family Lindsaeaceae C.Presl ex M.R.Schomb. (7 genera)

- Suborder Pteridineae J.Prado & Schuettp (1 family, 53 genera)

- Family Pteridaceae E.D.M.Kirchn. (53 genera)

- Subfamily Parkerioideae Burnett (2 genera)
- Subfamily Cryptogrammoideae S.Lindsay (3 genera)
- Subfamily Pteridoideae Link (13 genera)
- Subfamily Vittarioideae Link (12 genera)
- Subfamily Cheilanthoideae Horvat (23 genera)

- Suborder Dennstaedtiineae Schwartsb. & Hovenkamp (1 family, 10 genera)

- Family Dennstaedtiaceae Lotsy (10 genera)

- Suborder Aspleniineae H.Schneid. & C.J.Rothf (11 families, 72 genera)

- Family Cystopteridaceae Shmakov (3 genera)
- Family Rhachidosoraceae X.C.Zhang (1 genus)
- Family Diplaziopsidaceae X.C.Zhang & Christenh. (2 genera)
- Family Desmophlebiaceae Mynssen (1 genus)
- Family Hemidictyaceae Christenh. & H.Schneid. (1 genus)
- Family Aspleniaceae Newman (2 genera)
- Family Woodsiaceae Herter (1 genus)
- Family Onocleaceae Pic.Serm. (4 genera)
- Family Blechnaceae Newman (24 genera)

- Subfamily Stenochlaenoideae (Ching) J.P.Roux (3 genera)
- Subfamily Woodwardioideae Gasper (3 genera)
- Subfamily Blechnoideae Gasper, V.A.O.Dittrich & Salino (18 genera)

- Family Athyriaceae Alston (3 genera)
- Family Thelypteridaceae Ching ex Pic.Serm. (30 genera)

- Subfamily Phegopteridoideae Salino, A.R.Sm. & T.E.Almeid (3 genera)
- Subfamily Thelypteridoideae C.F.Reed (27 genera)

- Suborder Polypodiineae Dumort. (9 families, 108 genera)

- Family Didymochlaenaceae Ching ex Li Bing Zhang & Liang Zhang (1 genus)
- Family Hypodematiaceae Ching (2 genera)
- Family Dryopteridaceae Herter (26 genera)

- Subfamily Polybotryoideae H.M.Liu & X.C.Zhang (7 genera)
- Subfamily Elaphoglossoideae (Pic.Serm.) Crabbe, Jermy & Mickel (11 genera)
- Subfamily Dryopteridoideae Link (6 genera)
- 2 genera not assigned to a subfamily

- Family Nephrolepidaceae Pic.Serm. (1 genus)
- Family Lomariopsidaceae Alston (4 genera)
- Family Tectariaceae Panigrahi (7 genera)
- Family Oleandraceae Ching ex Pic.Serm. (1 genus)
- Family Davalliaceae M.R.Schomb. (1 genus)
- Family Polypodiaceae J.Presl & C.Presl (65 genera)

- Subfamily Loxogrammoideae H.Schneid. (2 genera)
- Subfamily Platycerioideae B.K.Nayar (2 genera)
- Subfamily Drynarioideae Crabbe, Jermy & Mickel (6 genera)
- Subfamily Microsoroideae B.K.Nayar (12 genera)
- Subfamily Polypodioideae Sweet (9 genera)
- Subfamily Grammitidoideae Parris & Sundue (33 genera)
- 1 genus not assigned to a subfamily

== Number of genera ==
The number of genera used in PPG I has proved controversial. PPG I uses 18 lycopod and 319 fern genera. The earlier system put forward by Smith et al. (2006) had suggested a range of 274 to 312 genera for ferns alone. By contrast, the system of Christenhusz and Chase (2014) used 5 lycopod and about 212 fern genera. The number of fern genera was further reduced to 207 in a subsequent publication.

The number of genera used in each of these two approaches has been defended by their proponents. Defending PPG I, Schuettpelz et al. (2018) argue that the larger number of genera is a result of "the gradual accumulation of new collections and new data" and hence "a greater appreciation of fern diversity and [..] an improved ability to distinguish taxa". They also argue that the number of species per genus in the PPG I system is already higher than in other groups of organisms (about 33 species per genus for ferns as opposed to about 22 species per genus for angiosperms) and that reducing the number of genera as Christenhusz and Chase propose yields the 'excessive' number of about 50 species per genus for ferns. In response, Christenhusz and Chase (2018) argue that the excessive splitting of genera destabilises the usage of names and will lead to greater instability in future, especially when nuclear DNA is employed, and that the highly split genera have few if any characters that can be used to recognize them, making identification difficult, even to generic level. They further argue that comparing numbers of species per genus in different groups is "fundamentally meaningless", because there is no limit to numbers of species per genus. They also argue that the new findings in phylogeny can easily be treated at subgeneric and subfamilial levels, so that the names used by non-specialists will remain unaltered.

== See also ==
- List of fern families
