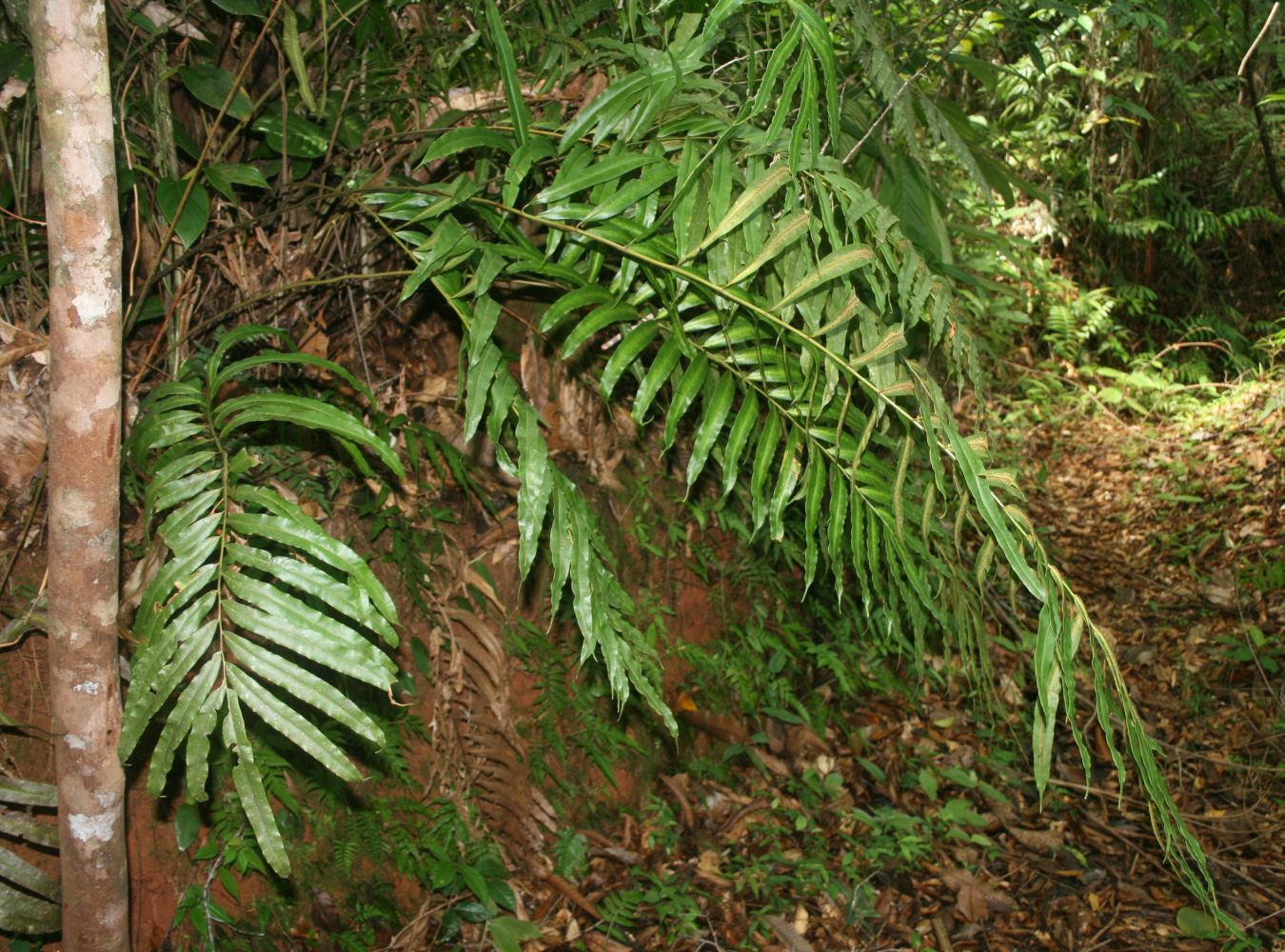

Scientific classification
- Kingdom: Plantae
- Clade: Tracheophytes
- Division: Polypodiophyta
- Class: Polypodiopsida
- Order: Cyatheales
- Family: Metaxyaceae
- Genus: Metaxya
- Species: M. rostrata

Binomial name
- Metaxya rostrata (Kunth) C.Presl

Synonyms
- Alsophila blechnoides Hook.; Alsophila blechnoides var. polycarpa Hook.; Alsophila rostrata (Kunth) Mart.; Amphidesmium blechnoides Klotzsch; Amphidesmium blechnoides var. polycarpum (Hook.) T.Moore; Amphidesmium rostratum (Kunth) J.Sm.; Aspidium rostratum Kunth (1816); Cyathea blechnoides Domin; Polypodium blechnoides Rich.; Polypodium humboldtii Poir.; Polypodium rostratum Humb. & Bonpl. ex Willd., nom. illeg. homonym. post.

= Metaxya rostrata =

Species of fern

Metaxya rostrata is a species of fern in the family Metaxyaceae. It is native to northern Brazil, Colombia, Peru, and Venezuela. It can be found in all five natural regions of Colombia. It is characterized by its large fronds that are 1–2 m long.

The species was first described as Aspidium rostratum by Carl Sigismund Kunth in 1816. In 1836 Carl Borivoj Presl placed the species in genus Metaxya as M. rostrata.
