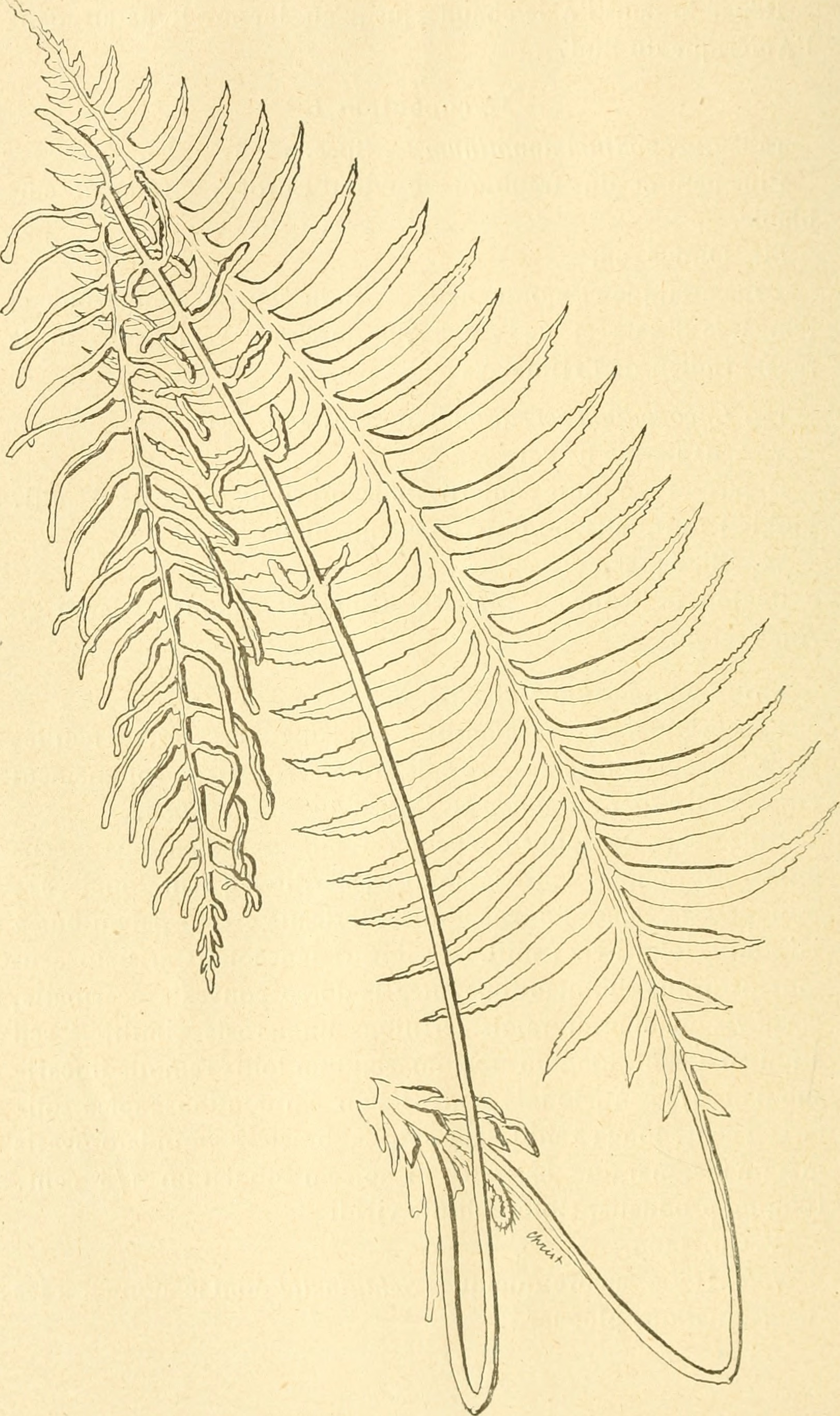

Conservation status
- Endangered (IUCN 3.1)

Scientific classification
- Kingdom: Plantae
- Clade: Tracheophytes
- Division: Polypodiophyta
- Class: Polypodiopsida
- Order: Cyatheales
- Family: Plagiogyriaceae
- Genus: Plagiogyria
- Species: P. assurgens

Binomial name
- Plagiogyria assurgens H.Christ

= Plagiogyria assurgens =

Species of fern

Plagiogyria assurgens is a species of fern in the family Plagiogyriaceae. It is endemic (unique) to China.
