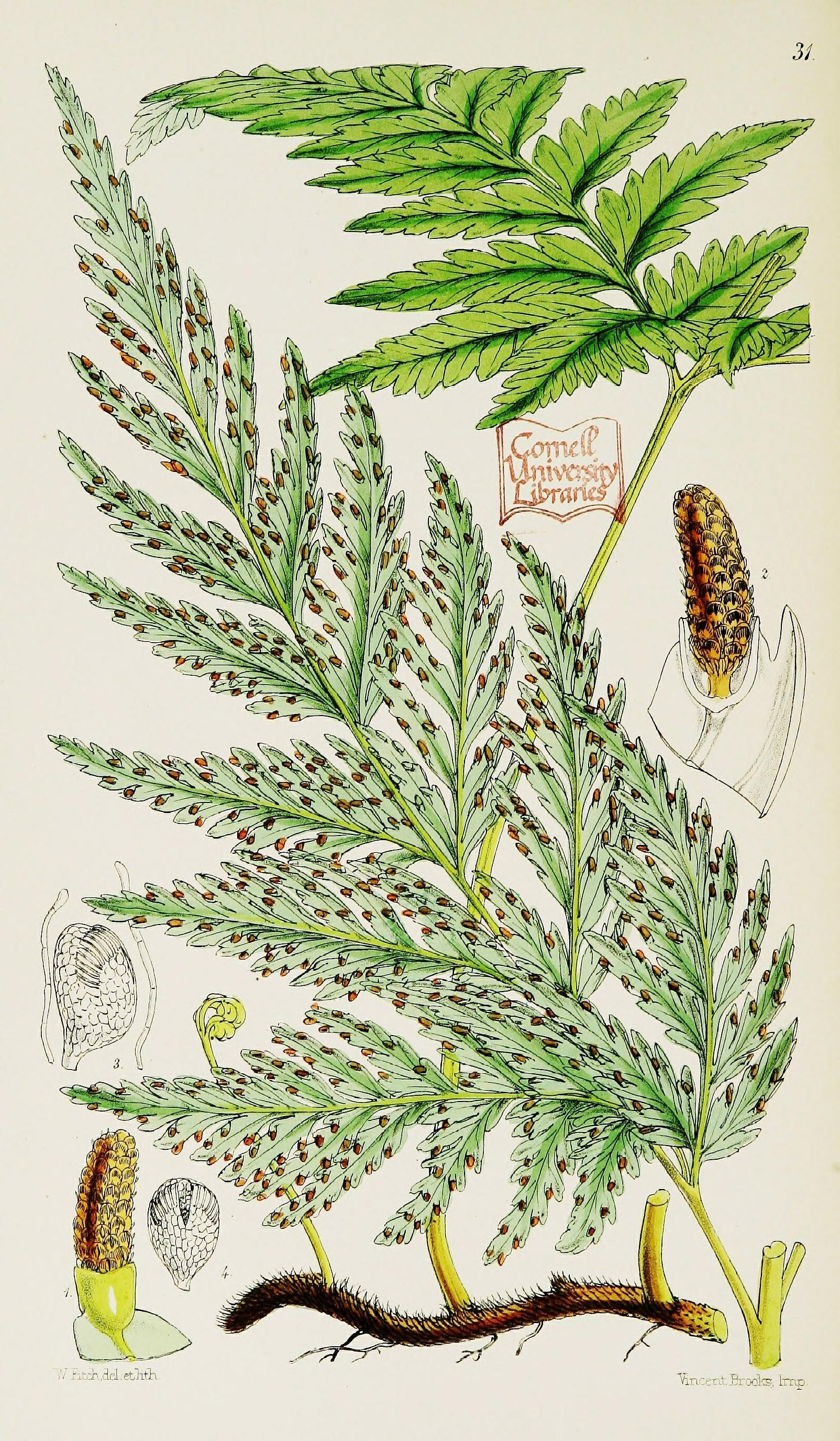

Scientific classification
- Kingdom: Plantae
- Clade: Tracheophytes
- Division: Polypodiophyta
- Class: Polypodiopsida
- Order: Cyatheales
- Family: Loxsomataceae
- Genus: Loxsoma; R.Br. ex A.Cunn.
- Species: L. cunninghamii

Binomial name
- Loxsoma cunninghamii R.Br. ex A.Cunn.

Synonyms
- Loxoma Brown & Cunningham non Garay 1972; Loxoma cunninghamii Brown & Cunningham

= Loxsoma =

Genus of ferns

Loxsoma is a terrestrial fern genus endemic to New Zealand with a single species, Loxsoma cunninghamii.

In the original publication, the name was spelled Loxoma but subsequently it was spelled Loxsoma, and this is now the conserved spelling.
