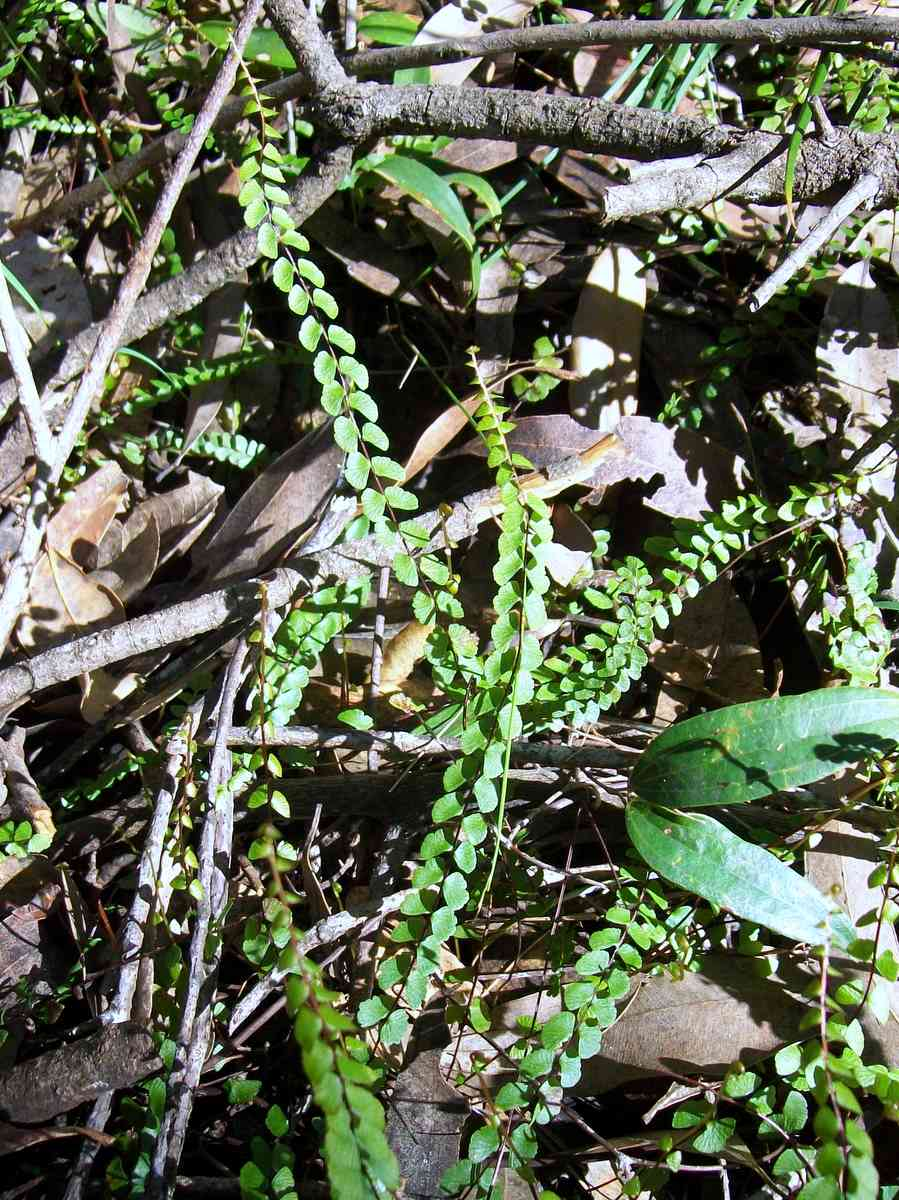
- Lindsaea linearis

Scientific classification
- Kingdom: Plantae
- Clade: Tracheophytes
- Division: Polypodiophyta
- Class: Polypodiopsida
- Order: Polypodiales
- Suborder: Lindsaeineae; Lehtonen & Tuomisto

Type genus
- Lindsaea Dryand. ex Sm.

Families
- Cystodiaceae; Lindsaeaceae; Lonchitidaceae

= Lindsaeineae =

Suborder of ferns

Lindsaeineae is a suborder of ferns (Polypodiopsida), order Polypodiales, created by the Pteridophyte Phylogeny Group (2016). It consists of two monogeneric families plus the larger Lindsaeaceae with seven genera, and the suborder contains about 237 species overall. It corresponds to Lindsaeaceae sensu Smith 2016.

== Description ==
The rhizomes are short to long, creeping but rarely ascending, covered with non-clathrate scales (rarely hairs). The petioles are single, rarely double (sometimes several fusing into two in the upper part of the stipe). They contain vascular bundles and the sori are marginal to sub-marginal, generally protected by laminar true indusia (rarely marginal pseudo-indusia or both).

== Taxonomy ==
Lindsaeineae are placed within the Polypodiales and are phylogenetically related to the other five suborders as shown in this cladogram:

- Polypodiales
  - - Saccolomatineae
    - Lindsaeineae
  - - Pteridiineae
    - - Dennstaedtiineae
      - - Aspleniineae
        - Polypodiineae

=== Subdivision ===
Lindsaeineae contains three families:

- Cystodiaceae J.R.Croft monotypic Cystodium sorbifolium
- Lindsaeaceae C.Presl ex M.R.Schomb. Seven genera, and an estimated 234 species
- Lonchitidaceae Doweld monogeneric Lonchitis 2 species

The three families constituting the Lindsaeineae are related as follows:

- Lindsaeineae
  - Cystodiaceae
  - - Lonchitidaceae
    - Lindsaeaceae

== Bibliography ==
- Chase, Mark W.; Reveal, James L. (2009). "A phylogenetic classification of the land plants to accompany APG III". Botanical Journal of the Linnean Society. 161 (2): 122–127. doi:10.1111/j.1095-8339.2009.01002.x.
- Christenhusz, M. J. M.; Zhang, X. C.; Schneider, H. (18 February 2011). "A linear sequence of extant families and genera of lycophytes and ferns". Phytotaxa. 19 (1): 7. CiteSeerX 10.1.1.222.1337. doi:10.11646/phytotaxa.19.1.2.
- Christenhusz, Maarten J.M.; Chase, Mark W. (2014). "Trends and concepts in fern classification". Annals of Botany. 113 (4): 571–594. doi:10.1093/aob/mct299. PMC 3936591. PMID 24532607.
- Christenhusz, Maarten JM & Byng, J. W. (2016). "The number of known plants species in the world and its annual increase". Phytotaxa. 261 (3): 201–217. doi:10.11646/phytotaxa.261.3.1.
- Lehtonen, Samuli (2011). "Towards Resolving the Complete Fern Tree of Life". PLoS ONE. 6 (10) e24851. Bibcode:2011PLoSO...624851L. doi:10.1371/journal.pone.0024851. PMC 3192703. PMID 22022365.
- Pryer, Kathleen M.; Schneider, Harald; Smith, Alan R.; Cranfill, Raymond; Wolf, Paul G.; Hunt, Jeffrey S.; Sipes, Sedonia D. (2001). "Horsetails and ferns are a monophyletic group and the closest living relatives to seed plants". Nature. 409 (6820): 618–622. Bibcode:2001Natur.409..618S. doi:10.1038/35054555. PMID 11214320. S2CID 4367248.
- Ranker, Tom A.; Haufler, Christopher H., eds. (2008). Biology and Evolution of Ferns and Lycophytes. Cambridge University Press. ISBN 978-0-521-87411-3.
- Schneider, Harald; Schuettpelz, Eric; Pryer, Kathleen M.; Cranfill, Raymond; Magallón, Susana; Lupia, Richard (1 April 2004). "Ferns diversified in the shadow of angiosperms". Nature. 428 (6982): 553–557. Bibcode:2004Natur.428..553S. doi:10.1038/nature02361. PMID 15058303. S2CID 4395350.
- Schneider, Harald; Smith, Alan R.; Pryer, Kathleen M. (1 July 2009). "Is Morphology Really at Odds with Molecules in Estimating Fern Phylogeny?". Systematic Botany. 34 (3): 455–475. doi:10.1600/036364409789271209. S2CID 85855934.
- Smith, Alan R.; Pryer, Kathleen M.; Schuettpelz, Eric; Korall, Petra; Schneider, Harald; Wolf, Paul G. Fern classification (PDF). pp. 417–467., in Ranker & Haufler (2008)
