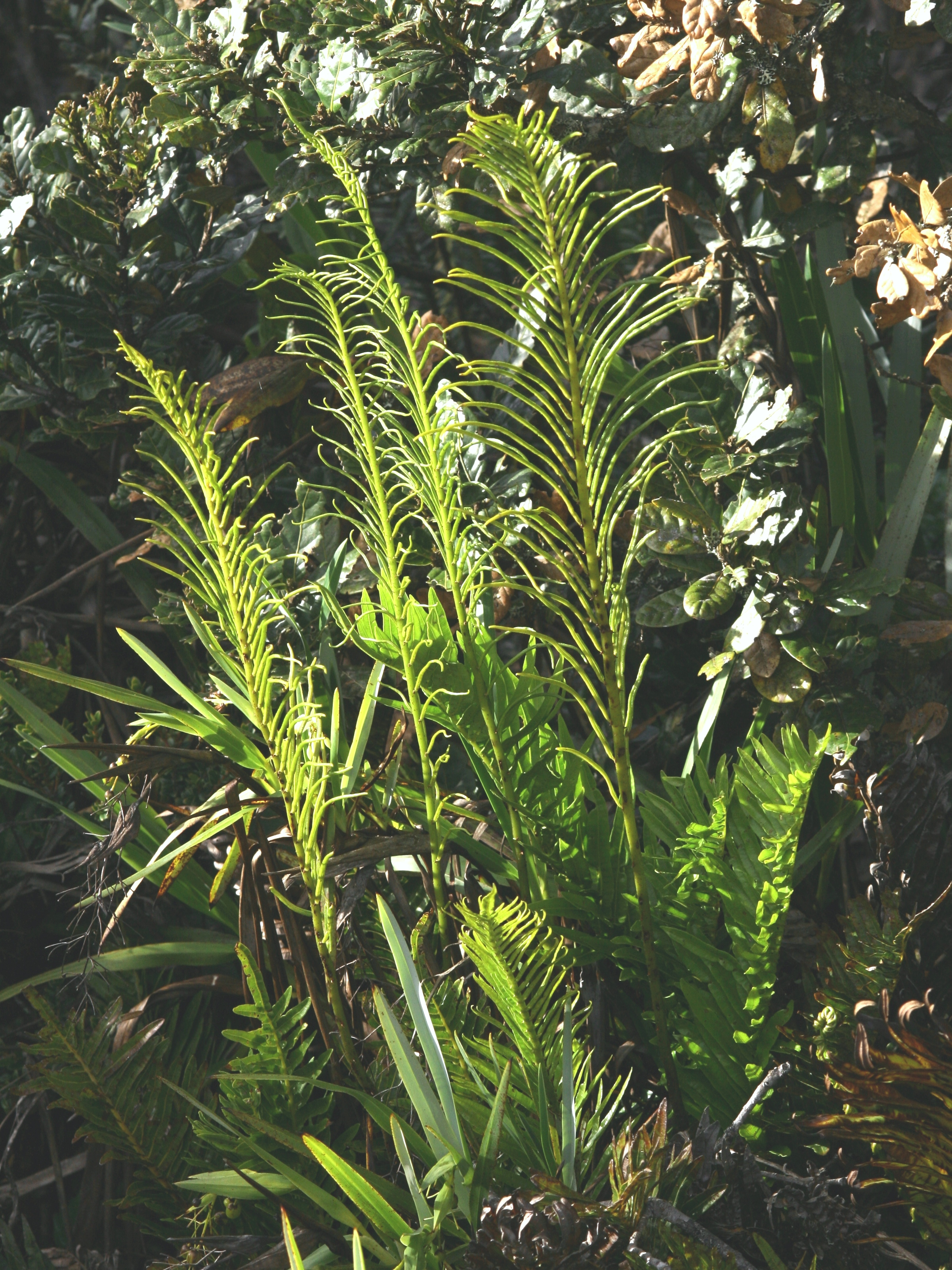
- Plagiogyria egenolfioides

Scientific classification
- Kingdom: Plantae
- Clade: Tracheophytes
- Division: Polypodiophyta
- Class: Polypodiopsida
- Order: Cyatheales
- Family: Plagiogyriaceae; Bower
- Genus: Plagiogyria (Kunze) Mett.

Type species
- Plagiogyria euphlebia (Kunze) Mettenius

Species
- See text

Synonyms
- Polygramma Presl

= Plagiogyria =

Genus of ferns

Plagiogyria is a genus of ferns, the only genus in family Plagiogyriaceae in the Pteridophyte Phylogeny Group classification of 2016 (PPG I). Alternatively, the family may be treated as the subfamily Plagiogyrioideae of a very broadly defined family Cyatheaceae, the placement used for the genus in Plants of the World Online as of November 2019.

Ferns of this genus present two kind of fronds, the fertile ones longer than the sterile. These ferns are found on forest soils in mountainous areas of tropical and subtropical regions. Most are native to Asia; one is found in the Americas.

== Phylogeny ==
As of November 2019, Plants of the World Online accepted the following species.

Phylogeny of Plagiogyria

- Plagiogyria
  - section Carinatae
    - P. pectinata (Liebm.) Lellinger
    - - P. matsumurana Makino
      - P. stenoptera (Hance) Diels
  - section Plagiogyria
    - - P. adnata (Blume) Bedd.
      - P. egenolfioides (Baker) Copel.
    - - P. glauca (Blume) Mett.
      - - P. euphlebia (Kunze) Mett.
        - - P. koidzumii Tagawa
          - - P. japonica Nakai
            - P. ×wakabae Kurata ex Nakaike

Other species include:
- P. assurgens Christ
- P. falcata Copel.
- P. × neointermedia Nakaike
- P. pycnophylla (Kunze) Mett.
- P. × sessilifolia Nakaike
