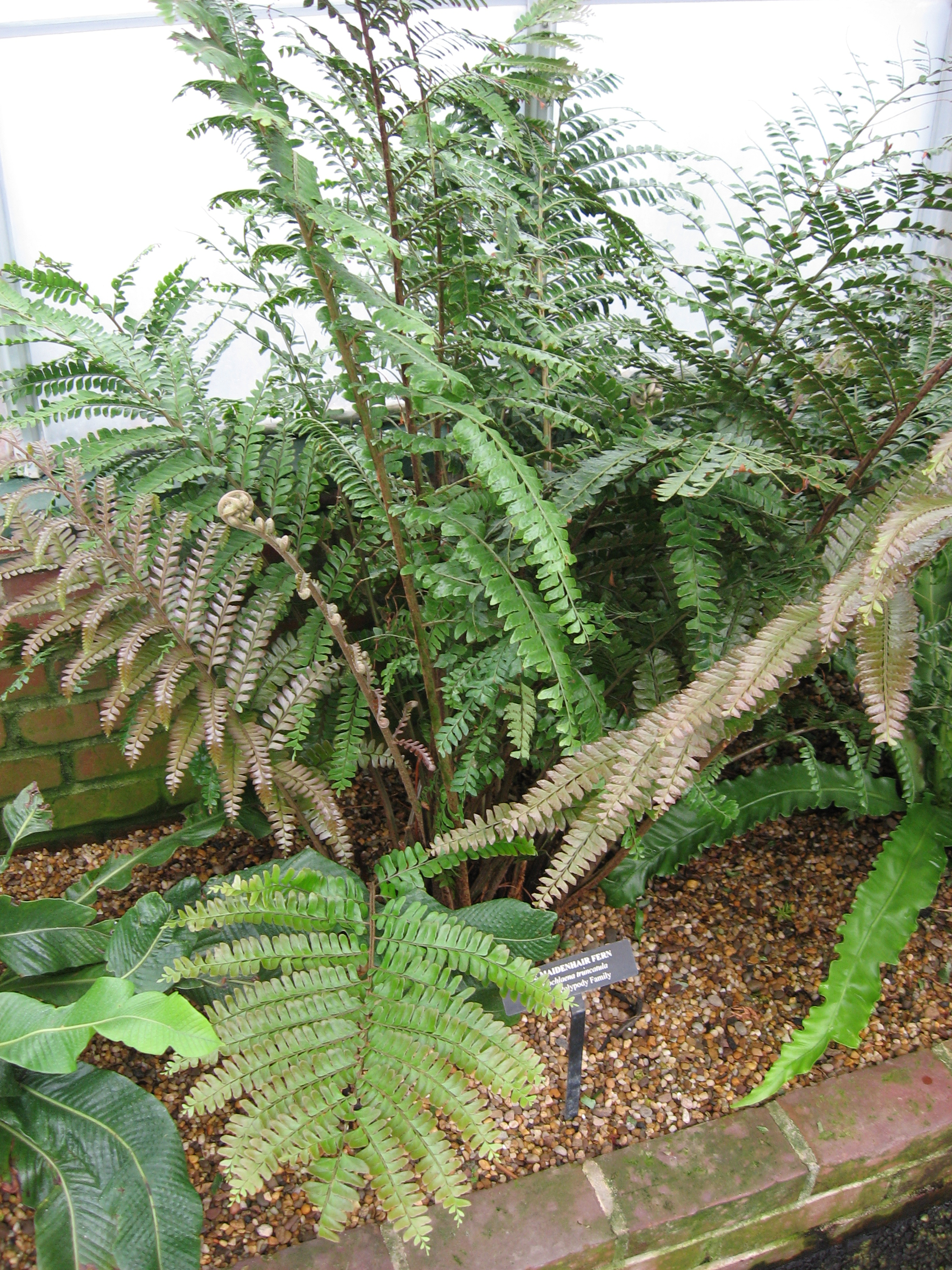
- Didymochlaena truncatula

Scientific classification
- Kingdom: Plantae
- Clade: Tracheophytes
- Division: Polypodiophyta
- Class: Polypodiopsida
- Order: Polypodiales
- Suborder: Polypodiineae
- Family: Didymochlaenaceae; Ching ex Li Bing Zhang & Liang Zhang
- Genus: Didymochlaena; Desv.

Type species
- Didymochlaena sinuosa Desv.

Species
- See text

Synonyms
- Hippodium Gaudich.; Hysterocarpus Langsd. ex Fée; Monochlaena Gaudich. non de Cassini; Tegularia Reinw.

= Didymochlaena =

Genus of ferns

Didymochlaena is a genus of ferns. In the Pteridophyte Phylogeny Group classification of 2016 (PPG I), it is the only genus in the family Didymochlaenaceae. Alternatively, the family may be placed in a very broadly defined family Polypodiaceae sensu lato as the subfamily Didymochlaenoideae.

== Description ==
Members of this genus are terrestrial, evergreen plants growing 0.8–3 m (2 ft 7 in – 9 ft 10 in) tall. The fronds arise from upright, scaly rhizomes. The leaves are bipinnate and imparipinnate.

== Phylogeny ==
This genus includes the following species:

External phylogeny from PPG I 2016
Internal phylogeny from Fern Tree of Life

- Polypodiineae (eupolypods I)
  - Didymochlaenaceae
  - - Hypodematiaceae
    - - Dryopteridaceae
      - - - Nephrolepidaceae
          - Lomariopsidaceae
        - - Tectariaceae
          - - Oleandraceae
            - - Davalliaceae
              - Polypodiaceae

- Didymochlaena
  - - D. truncatula (Sw.) J.Sm.
    - - section Amazonicae
        - D. mesoamericana Li Bing Zhang & H.Shang
        - - D. alpina Li Bing Zhang & H.Shang
          - D. amazonica Li Bing Zhang & H.Shang
  - - section Didymochlaena
      - D. sinuosa Desv.
      - - - D. philippensis Li Bing Zhang & H.Shang
          - D. punctata Li Bing Zhang & H.Shang
        - - D. oceanica Li Bing Zhang & H.Shang
          - - D. fijiensis Li Bing Zhang & H.Shang
            - D. solomonensis Li Bing Zhang & H.Shang
    - section Spinulosae
      - D. cameroonensis Li Bing Zhang & H.Shang
      - - - D. dimidiata Kunze
          - D. spinulosa (Brause) Li Bing Zhang & H.Shang
        - - - D. attenuata (Bonap.) Li Bing Zhang & H.Shang
            - D. madagascariensis Li Bing Zhang & H.Shang
          - - D. deltoidea Li Bing Zhang & H.Shang
            - - D. bipinnatipartita (Bonap.) Li Bing Zhang & H.Shang
              - D. microphylla (Bonap.) C.Chr.

Other species include:

- D. comorensis Li Bing Zhang & H.Shang
- D. cubensis Li Bing Zhang & H.Shang
- D. pulcherrima Herter
- D. squamata (Willd.) Desv.
