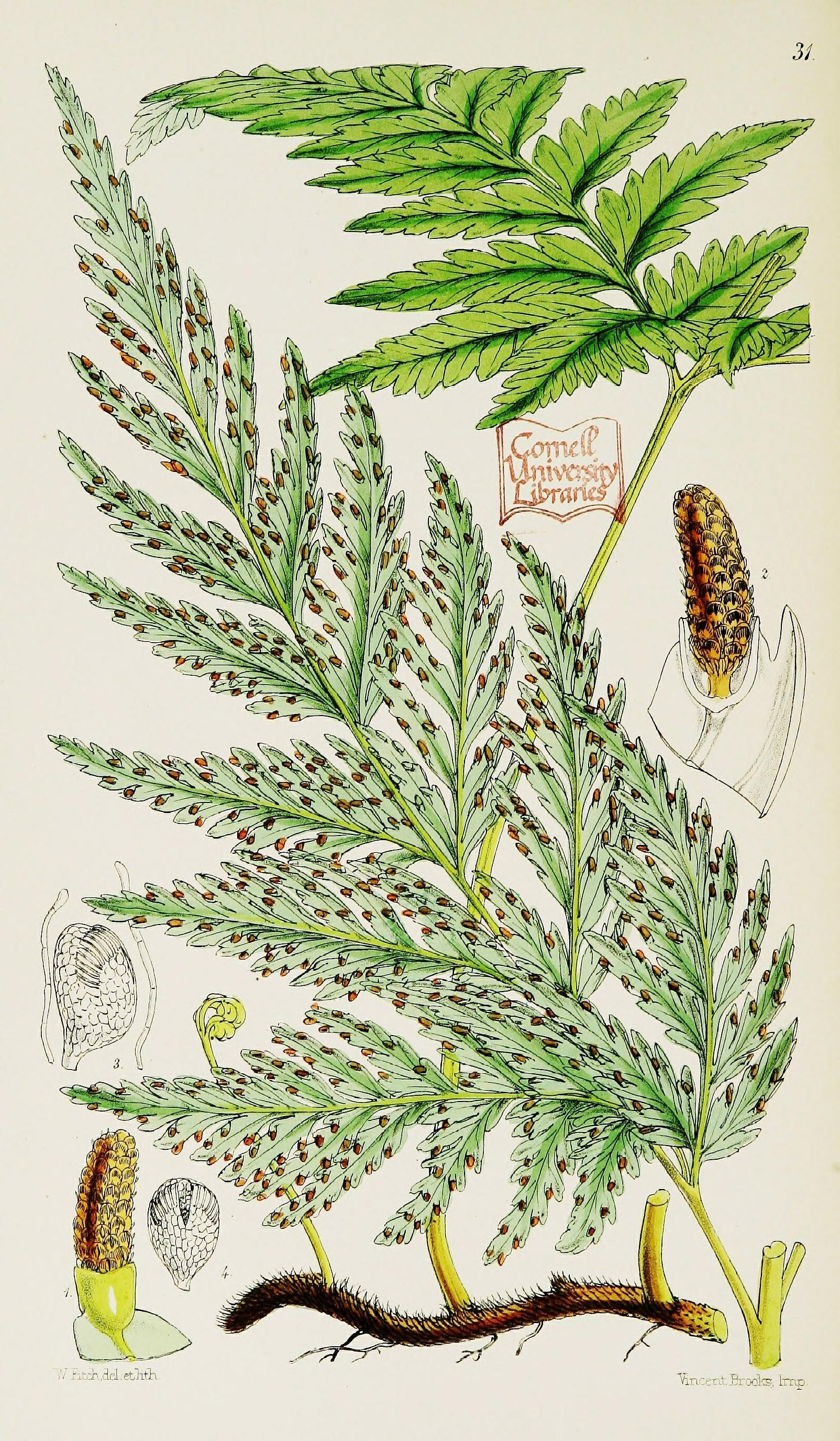
- Loxsoma cunninghamii

Scientific classification
- Kingdom: Plantae
- Clade: Tracheophytes
- Division: Polypodiophyta
- Class: Polypodiopsida
- Order: Cyatheales
- Family: Loxsomataceae; C.Presl

Genera
- Loxsoma; Loxsomopsis

Synonyms
- Loxsomatoideae Christenhusz 2014

= Loxsomataceae =

Family of ferns

The Loxsomataceae are a family of ferns in the order Cyatheales with two extant genera in the Pteridophyte Phylogeny Group classification of 2016 (PPG I). Alternatively, the family may be treated as the subfamily Loxsomatoideae of a very broadly defined family Cyatheaceae, the system used in Plants of the World Online as of November 2019.

It has leaves that can be as long as 5 metres (16 ft) long. Extant species in this family are found in New Zealand, Costa Rica, and South America. Fossil species in this family, dating from as early as the Jurassic, have been found in North America, India and Japan.

== Genera ==
Two genera are placed in the family in the Pteridophyte Phylogeny Group classification of 2016 (PPG I), each with only one species:

- Loxsoma R.Br.
- Loxsomopsis Christ
