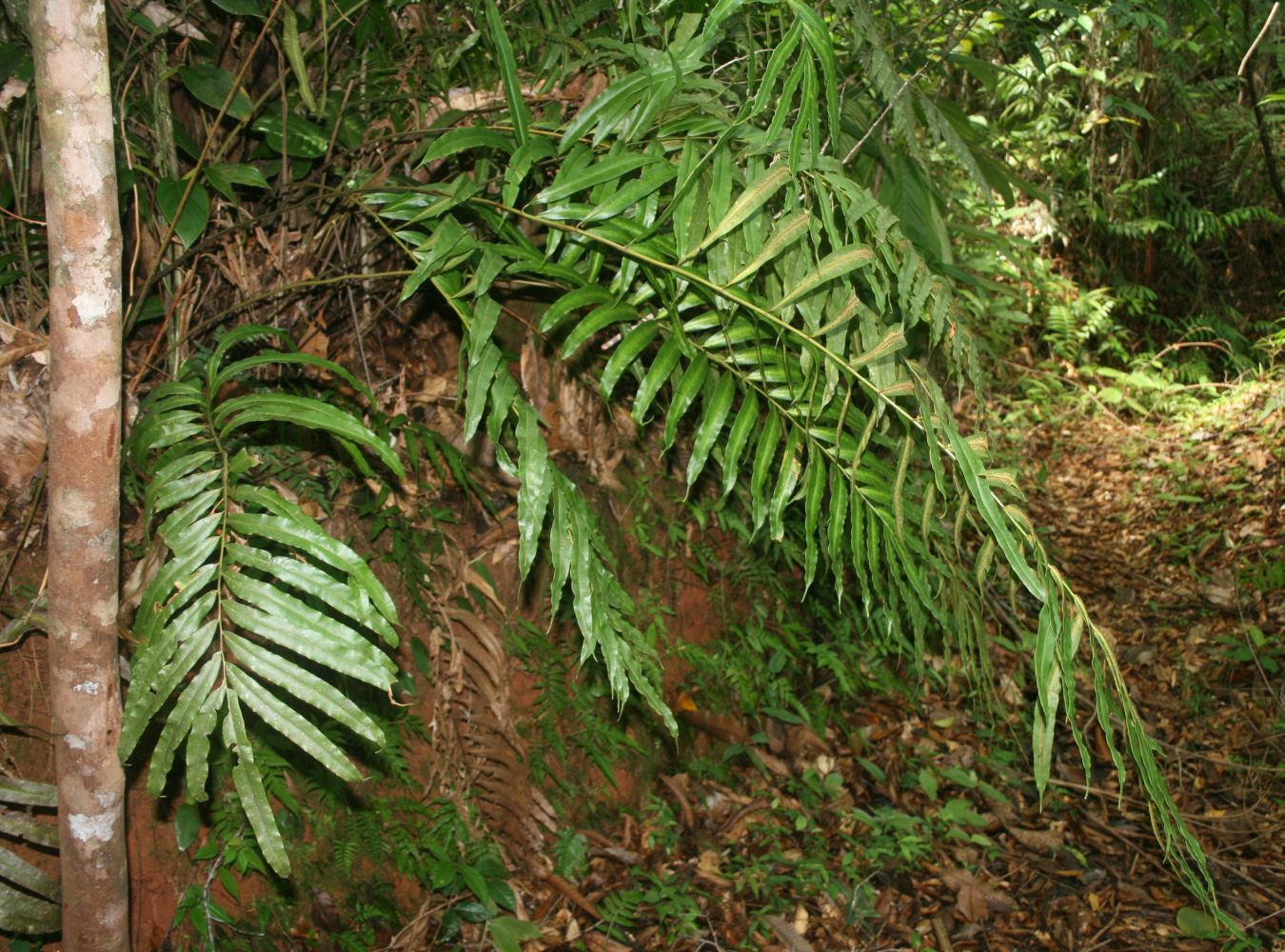
- Metaxya rostrata

Scientific classification
- Kingdom: Plantae
- Clade: Tracheophytes
- Division: Polypodiophyta
- Class: Polypodiopsida
- Order: Cyatheales
- Family: Metaxyaceae; Pic.Serm.
- Genus: Metaxya; C.Presl

Type species
- Metaxya rostrata (Kunth) C.Presl

Species
- See text.
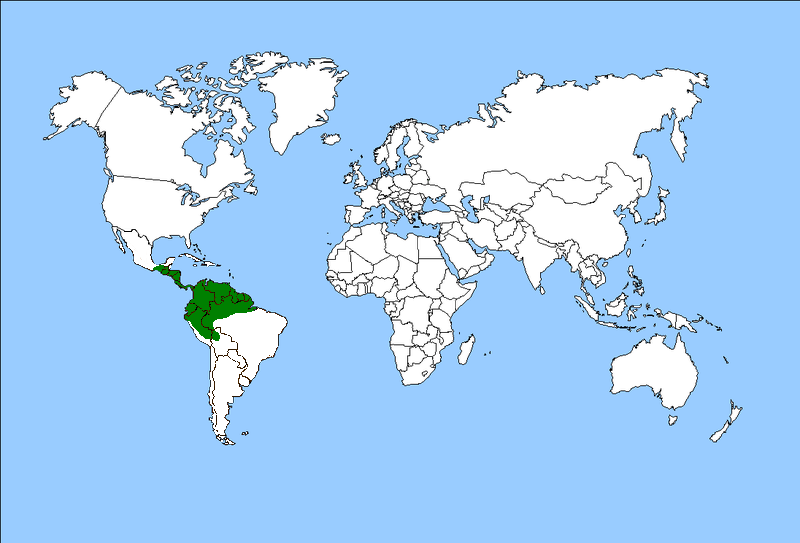
- Metaxyaceae distribution

Synonyms
- Amphidesmium Schott 1834 ex Kunze

= Metaxya =

Genus of ferns

Metaxya is a neotropical genus of ferns in the order Cyatheales. It is the only genus in the family Metaxyaceae in the Pteridophyte Phylogeny Group classification of 2016 (PPG I). Alternatively, the genus may be placed in the subfamily Metaxyoideae of a more broadly defined family Cyatheaceae, the family placement used in Plants of the World Online as of November 2019.

The species of the genus are characterized by large fronds that approach 8 ft (2.5 m) in length.

== Species ==
As of January 2023, Plants of the World Online accepted the following species:

Image	Scientific name	Distribution
	Metaxya contamanensis Tuomisto & G.G.Cárdenas	Peru to Bolivia
	Metaxya elongata Tuomisto & G.G.Cárdenas	Belize, Colombia, Costa Rica, Guatemala, Honduras, Panamá, Venezuela
	Metaxya lanosa A.R.Sm. & Tuomisto	Peru, Venezuela (Amazonas) to Guyana.
	Metaxya rostrata (Kunth) C.Presl	Mexico (Chiapas), Belize, Bolivia, Brazil, Colombia, Costa Rica, Ecuador, French Guiana, Guatemala, Guyana, Honduras, Nicaragua, Panamá, Peru, Suriname, Trinidad-Tobago, Venezuela
	Metaxya scalaris Tuomisto & G.G.Cárdenas	Brazil, French Guiana, Guyana, Suriname, Venezuela

== Phylogeny ==
Phylogeny of Metaxya

- - M. parkeri (Hooker & Greville) Smith
  - - - M. rostrata (Kunth) Presl
      - M. scalaris Tuomisto & Cárdenas
    - - M. lanosa Smith & Tuomisto
      - - M. contamanensis Tuomisto & Cárdenas
        - M. elongata Tuomisto & Cárdenas
