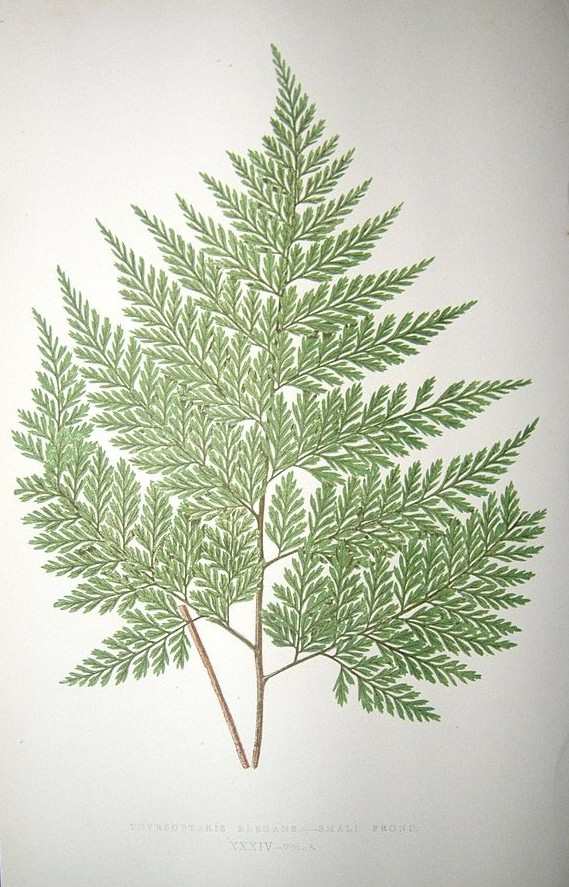

Scientific classification
- Kingdom: Plantae
- Clade: Tracheophytes
- Division: Polypodiophyta
- Class: Polypodiopsida
- Order: Cyatheales
- Family: Thyrsopteridaceae; C.Presl
- Genus: Thyrsopteris; Kunze
- Species: T. elegans

Binomial name
- Thyrsopteris elegans Kunze

Synonyms
- Family: Thyrsopterideae (Fée) Pfeiffer; Thyrsopteridoideae B.K.Nayar; Genus: Chonta Molina 1782; Panicularia Colla 1836; Species: Dicksonia elegans (Kunze 1834) Mettenius 1861; Panicularia berteri Colla 1836

= Thyrsopteris =

Thyrsopteris Temporal range: Cenomanian–Recent

Genus of ferns

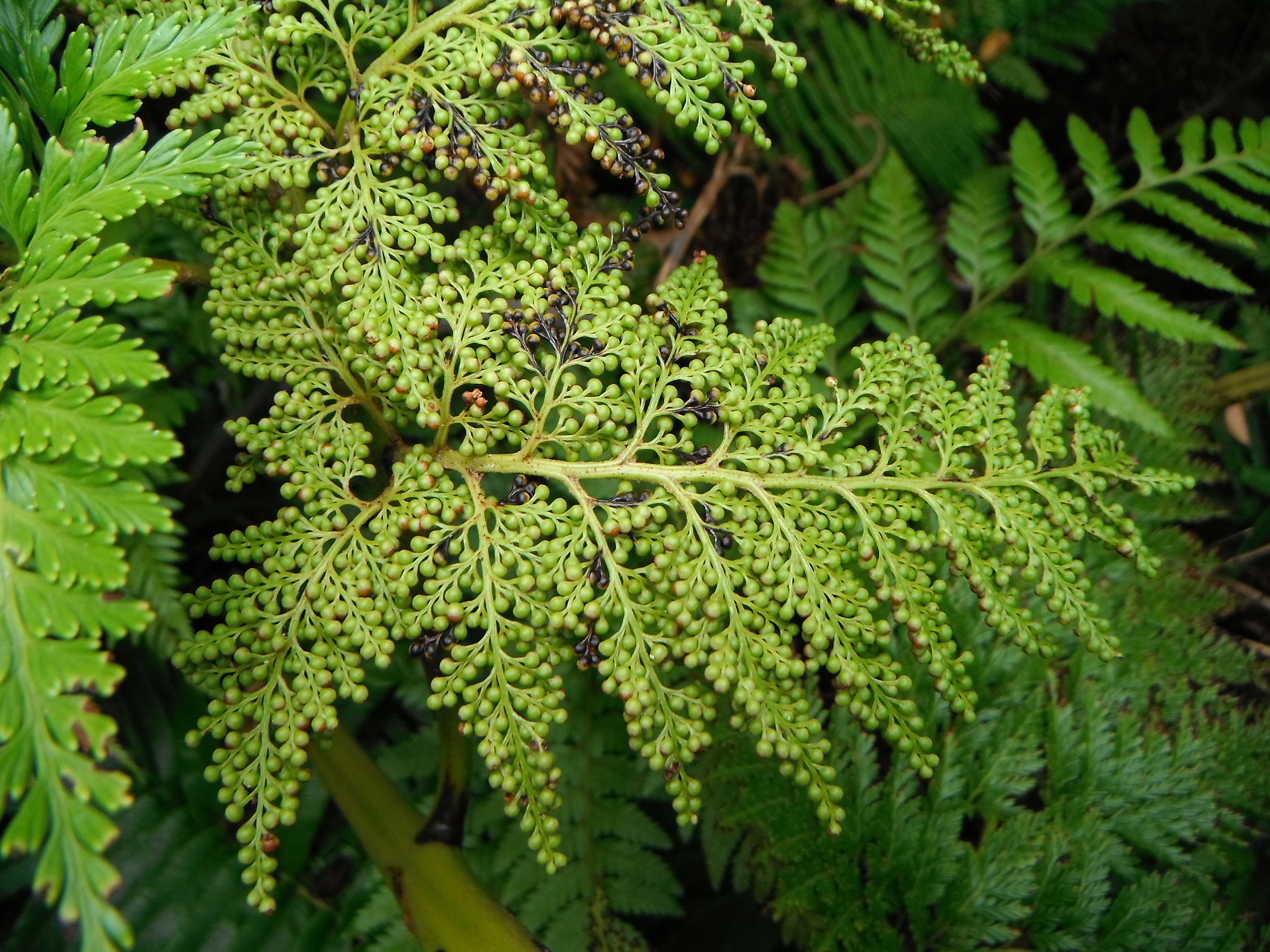

Thyrsopteris is a genus of tree fern. It contains a single living species, Thyrsopteris elegans, endemic to the Juan Fernandez Archipelago off the coast of Chile.

The oldest records of the genus are the species Thyrsopteris cretacea and Thyrsopteris cyathindusia which were described from the Burmese amber of Myanmar, dating to the Cenomanian of the Cretaceous period, around 99 million years ago. Other fossil species include Thyrsopteris antiqua from the Upper Cretaceous of Chile and Thyrsopteris shenii from the Paleogene of King George Island, Antarctica A thyrsopterid rachis is also known from the Upper Cretaceous of Japan.

== Description ==
T. elegans is perhaps unique in having fronds which are quadripinnate or even pentapinnate (leaflets are the fifth order of branching).

== Taxonomy ==
Thyrsopteris is the only genus in the family Thyrsopteridaceae in the Pteridophyte Phylogeny Group classification of 2016 (PPG I). Alternatively, the genus may be placed in the subfamily Thyrsopteridoideae of a more broadly defined family Cyatheaceae, the family placement used in Plants of the World Online as of November 2019.
