= Desmophlebium =

Scientific classification
- Kingdom: Plantae
- Clade: Tracheophytes
- Division: Polypodiophyta
- Class: Polypodiopsida
- Order: Polypodiales
- Suborder: Aspleniineae
- Family: Desmophlebiaceae; Mynssen, A.Vasco, Sylvestre, R.C.Moran & Rouhan
- Genus: Desmophlebium; Mynssen, A.Vasco, Sylvestre, R.C. Moran & Rouhan

Type species
- Desmophlebium lechleri (Mettenius 1856) Mynssen et al. 2016

Species
- D. lechleri

Genus of ferns

Desmophlebium is a genus of ferns. In the Pteridophyte Phylogeny Group classification of 2016, it is the only genus in the family Desmophlebiaceae. Other sources place it in a more widely defined Aspleniaceae.

== Taxonomy ==
The family and genus were erected in 2016, following a molecular phylogenetic study. It was shown that the species previously known as Diplazium lechleri was sister to a clade formed by the families Hemidictyaceae and Aspleniaceae, considerably removed from the Athyriaceae where it had previously been classified. Accordingly, a new genus and family were created and Diplazium lechleri transferred to Desmophlebium lechleri. Another species was added to the genus on the basis of its morphology.

The generic name refers to the distinctive thickened vein running just inside the edge of a pinna (submarginal) connecting the ends of other veins. The authors derived it from the Greek δεσμός, desmos, meaning 'band', combined with φλεβός, phlebos, meaning 'vein'. (Phlebos is the genitive of φλέψ, phleps, 'vein'.)

In the Pteridophyte Phylogeny Group classification of 2016 (PPG I), the family Desmophlebiaceae is a member of the subclass Polypodiidae (the leptosporangiate ferns), order Polypodiales, suborder Aspleniineae – a group known informally as "eupolypods II". A consensus cladogram showing one hypothesis for its relationship to other families in the suborder is:

- Aspleniineae
  - Cystopteridaceae
  - - - Rhachidosoraceae
      - - Diplaziopsidaceae
        - - Desmophlebiaceae
          - - Hemidictyaceae
            - Aspleniaceae
    - - - Woodsiaceae
        - - - Onocleaceae
            - Blechnaceae
          - Athyriaceae
      - Thelypteridaceae

=== Species ===
As of October 2026, the Checklist of Ferns and Lycophytes of the World accepts two species:

- Desmophlebium lechleri (Mett.) Mynssen, A.Vasco, Sylvestre, R.C.Moran & Rouhan
- Desmophlebium longisorum (Baker) Mynssen, A.Vasco, Sylvestre, R.C.Moran & Rouhan
