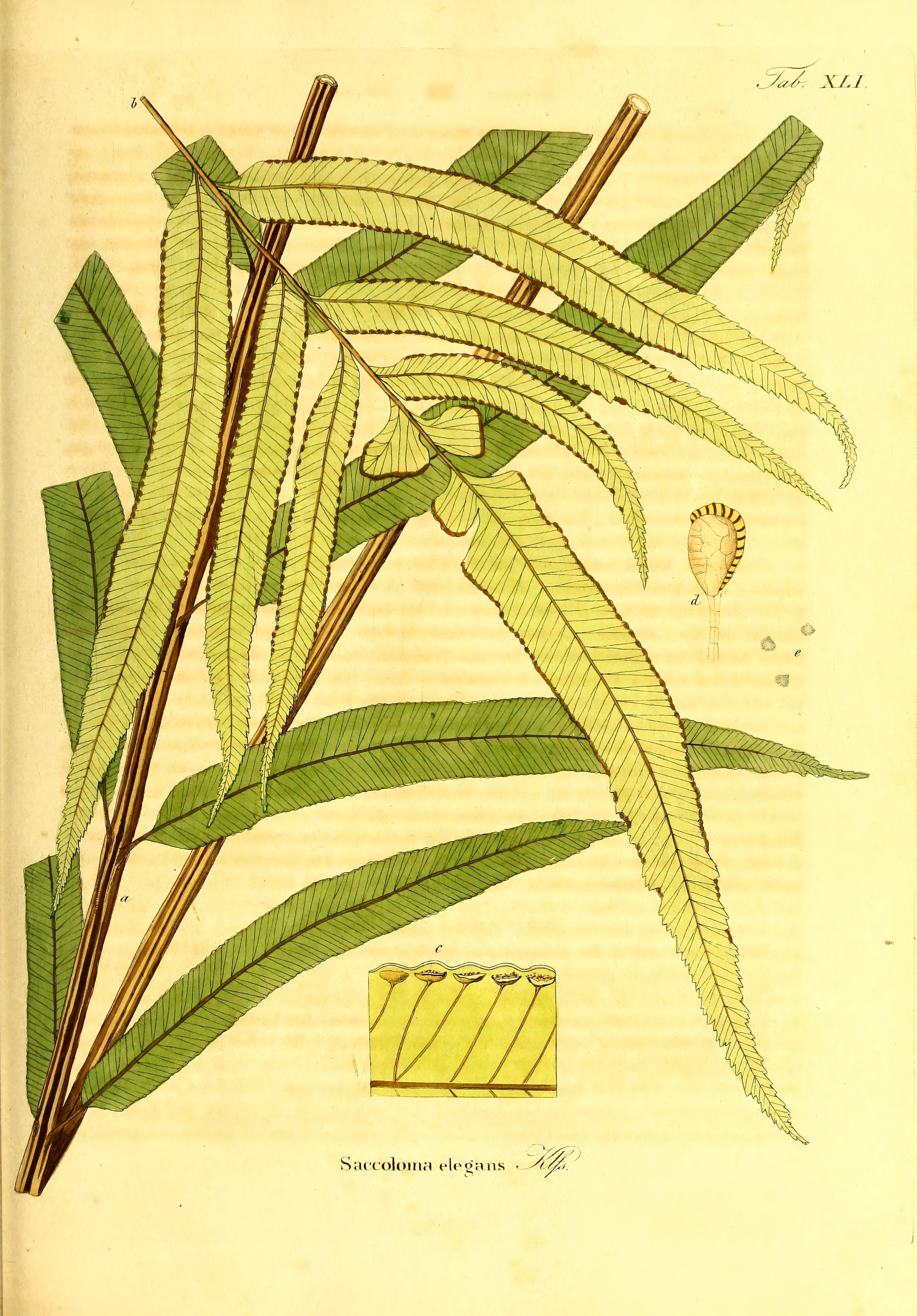
- Saccoloma elegans

Scientific classification
- Kingdom: Plantae
- Clade: Tracheophytes
- Division: Polypodiophyta
- Class: Polypodiopsida
- Order: Polypodiales
- Suborder: Saccolomatineae; Hovenkamp
- Family: Saccolomataceae; Doweld

Type species
- Saccoloma elegans Kaulfuss

Genera
- Orthiopteris; Saccoloma

Synonyms
- Saccolomatoideae Kramer 1990

= Saccolomataceae =

Family of ferns

Saccolomataceae is a family of ferns in the order Polypodiales with about 19 species. It has been formerly treated as part of the Dennstaedtiaceae, however it has been classified as its own family according to Smith et al. (2006) The genus Saccoloma has been classified to include Orthiopteris, but the phylogeny of the group not yet fully understood. The family includes a dozen known species.

== Description ==
Saccolomataceae generally have the following characteristics: Terrestrial; rhizomes short-creeping to erect and trunk-like; petioles each with an omega-shaped vascular strand; blades pinnate to decompound and lacking articulate hairs; veins free; sori terminal on the veins; indusia pouch- or cup-shaped.

== Taxonomy ==
In 2016 the Pteridophyte Phylogeny Group placed it as the sole family in the Saccolomatineae, one of six suborders making up the Polypodiales order. These suborders are phylogenetically related as shown in this cladogram:

External phylogeny

- Polypodiales
  - - Saccolomatineae
    - Lindsaeineae
  - - Pteridiineae
    - - Dennstaedtiineae
      - - Aspleniineae
        - Polypodiineae

Internal phylogeny

- Saccolomataceae
  - Orthiopteris Copeland 2008
  - Saccoloma Kaulfuss 1820

== Distribution ==
Saccolomataceae is pantropical.

== Bibliography ==
- Chase, Mark W.; Reveal, James L. (2009). "A phylogenetic classification of the land plants to accompany APG III". Botanical Journal of the Linnean Society. 161 (2): 122–127. doi:10.1111/j.1095-8339.2009.01002.x.
- Christenhusz, M. J. M.; Zhang, X. C.; Schneider, H. (18 February 2011). "A linear sequence of extant families and genera of lycophytes and ferns". Phytotaxa. 19 (1): 7. Bibcode:2011Phytx..19....7C. doi:10.11646/phytotaxa.19.1.2. hdl:10138/28042.
- Christenhusz, Maarten J.M.; Chase, Mark W. (2014). "Trends and concepts in fern classification". Annals of Botany. 113 (4): 571–594. doi:10.1093/aob/mct299. PMC 3936591. PMID 24532607.
- Christenhusz, Maarten JM & Byng, J. W. (2016). "The number of known plants species in the world and its annual increase". Phytotaxa. 261 (3): 201–217. Bibcode:2016Phytx.261..201C. doi:10.11646/phytotaxa.261.3.1.
- Lehtonen, Samuli (2011). "Towards Resolving the Complete Fern Tree of Life". PLoS ONE. 6 (10) e24851. Bibcode:2011PLoSO...624851L. doi:10.1371/journal.pone.0024851. PMC 3192703. PMID 22022365.
- Pryer, Kathleen M.; Schneider, Harald; Smith, Alan R.; Cranfill, Raymond; Wolf, Paul G.; Hunt, Jeffrey S.; Sipes, Sedonia D. (2001). "Horsetails and ferns are a monophyletic group and the closest living relatives to seed plants". Nature. 409 (6820): 618–622. doi:10.1038/35054555. PMID 11214320. S2CID 4367248.
- Pteridophyte Phylogeny Group (November 2016). "A community-derived classification for extant lycophytes and ferns". Journal of Systematics and Evolution. 54 (6): 563–603. Bibcode:2016JSyEv..54..563.. doi:10.1111/jse.12229. S2CID 39980610.
- Ranker, Tom A.; Haufler, Christopher H., eds. (2008). Biology and Evolution of Ferns and Lycophytes. Cambridge University Press. ISBN 978-0-521-87411-3.
- Schneider, Harald; Schuettpelz, Eric; Pryer, Kathleen M.; Cranfill, Raymond; Magallón, Susana; Lupia, Richard (1 April 2004). "Ferns diversified in the shadow of angiosperms". Nature. 428 (6982): 553–557. Bibcode:2004Natur.428..553S. doi:10.1038/nature02361. PMID 15058303.
- Schneider, Harald; Smith, Alan R.; Pryer, Kathleen M. (1 July 2009). "Is Morphology Really at Odds with Molecules in Estimating Fern Phylogeny?". Systematic Botany. 34 (3): 455–475. Bibcode:2009SysBo..34..455S. doi:10.1600/036364409789271209. S2CID 85855934.
- Smith, Alan R.; Kathleen M. Pryer; Eric Schuettpelz; Petra Korall; Harald Schneider; Paul G. Wolf (2006). "A classification for extant ferns" (PDF). Taxon. 55 (3): 705–731. Bibcode:2006Taxon..55..705S. doi:10.2307/25065646. JSTOR 25065646.
- Smith, Alan R.; Pryer, Kathleen M.; Schuettpelz, Eric; Korall, Petra; Schneider, Harald; Wolf, Paul G. (9 December 2024). Fern classification (PDF). pp. 417–467., in Ranker & Haufler (2008)
