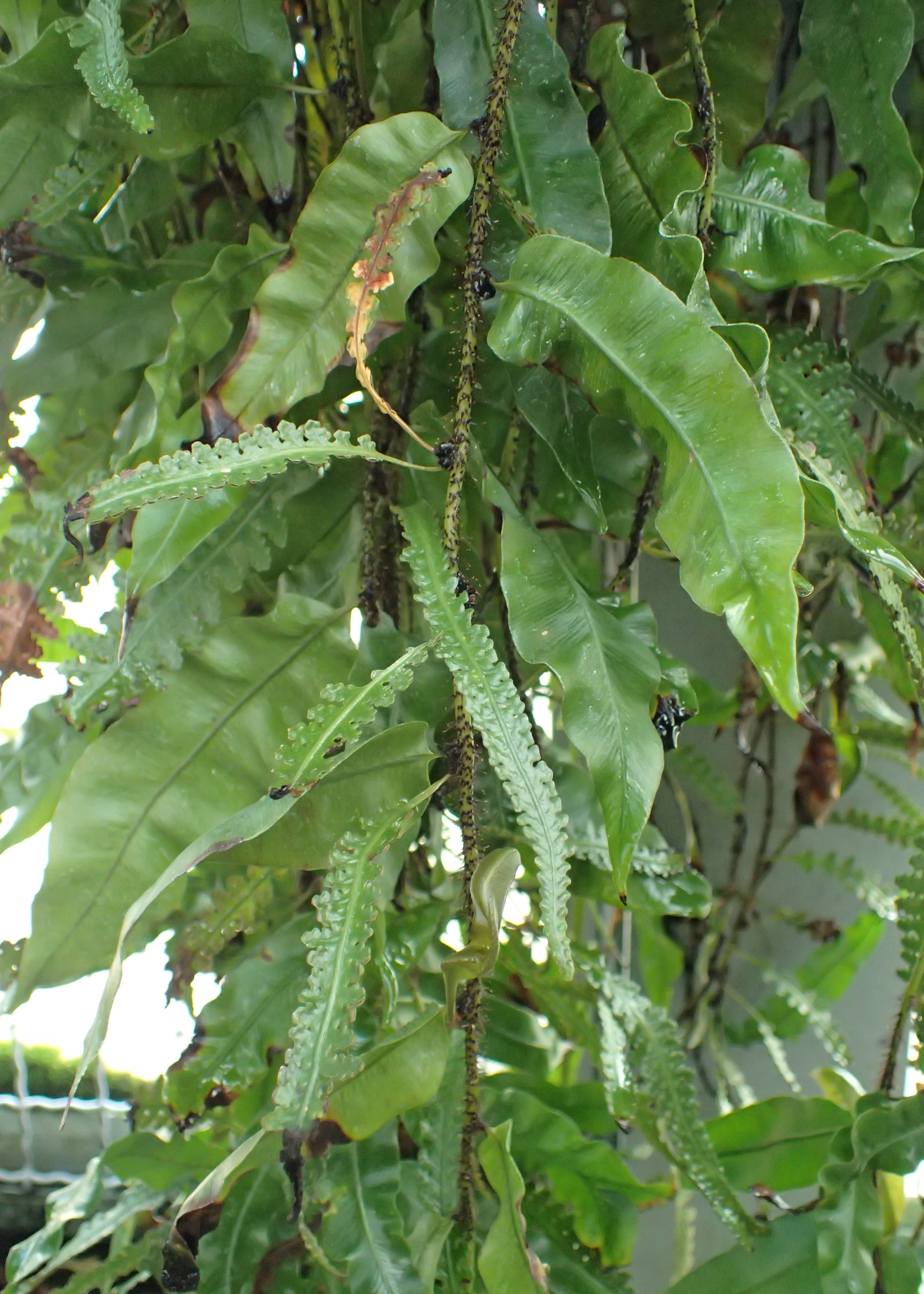
- Oleandra distenta

Scientific classification
- Kingdom: Plantae
- Clade: Tracheophytes
- Division: Polypodiophyta
- Class: Polypodiopsida
- Order: Polypodiales
- Suborder: Polypodiineae
- Family: Oleandraceae; Ching ex Pic.Serm.
- Genus: Oleandra; Cav.

Type species
- Oleandra neriiformis Cavanilles

Species
- See text

Synonyms
- Ophiopteris Reinwardt 1824; Neuronia Don 1825

= Oleandra =

Genus of ferns

Oleandra is a genus of ferns. In the Pteridophyte Phylogeny Group classification of 2016 (PPG I), it is the only genus in the family Oleandraceae, which is placed in suborder Polypodiineae, order Polypodiales. Alternatively, the family may be placed in a very broadly defined family Polypodiaceae sensu lato as the subfamily Oleandroideae.

The genus contains about 15 species. Most are erect ground ferns or scandent epiphytes that start from the ground. The lamina (leafy area of the fronds) are simple or pinnate, and the individual pinnae are articulate to the rachis. The sporangia are contained in discrete round sori in a single row on either side of the midrib of the fronds.

== Species ==
As of October 2026, the Checklist of Ferns and Lycophytes of the World recognized the thirty-five extant species and two hybrids below.

=== Extant species ===
- Oleandra aequatorialis C.V.Miranda & Schwartsb.
- Oleandra angusta Copel.
- Oleandra annetii Tardieu
- Oleandra arbuscula C.V.Miranda & Schwartsb.
- Oleandra articulata (Sw.) C.Presl
- Oleandra australis Schwartsb. & J.Prado
- Oleandra baetae Damazio
- Oleandra bradei Christ
- Oleandra brasiliana Schwartsb. & J.Prado
- Oleandra costaricensis Maxon
- Oleandra coriacea Copel.
- Oleandra cumingii J.Sm.
- Oleandra decurrens Maxon
- Oleandra distenta Kunze
- Oleandra duidae A.C.Sm.
- Oleandra dura Maxon
- Oleandra ejurana C.D.Adams
- Oleandra hirta Brack.
- Oleandra hovenkampii C.V.Miranda & Schwartsb.
- Oleandra lehmannii Maxon
- Oleandra musifolia (Blume) C.Presl
- Oleandra neriiformis Cav.
- Oleandra pilosa Hook.
- Oleandra pistillaris (Sw.) C.Chr.
- Oleandra quartziticola Schwartsb. & J.Prado
- Oleandra sibbaldii Grev.
- Oleandra steyermarkii Lellinger ex C.V.Miranda & Labiak
- Oleandra trinitensis Maxon
- Oleandra trujillensis H.Karst.
- Oleandra undulata (Willd.) Ching
- Oleandra vulpina C.Chr.
- Oleandra wallichii (Hook.) C.Presl
- Oleandra welwitschii (Baker) Pic.Serm.
- Oleandra werneri Rosenst.
- Oleandra zapatana Lellinger

=== Hybrids ===
- Oleandra × afrobrasiliana C.V.Miranda & Schwartsb.
- Oleandra × nigrovenia C.V.Miranda & Schwartsb.

=== Extinct species ===
- †O. angustifolia Friedrich 1884
- †O. arctica (von Heer 1871) von Heer 1874
- †O. michelotii (Watelet 1865) von Heer 1874

== Phylogeny ==
The following cladogram for the suborder Polypodiineae (eupolypods I), based on the consensus cladogram in the Pteridophyte Phylogeny Group classification of 2016 (PPG I), shows a likely phylogenetic relationship between Oleandraceae and the other families of the clade.

External phylogeny

- Polypodiineae (eupolypods I)
  - Didymochlaenaceae
  - - Hypodematiaceae
    - - Dryopteridaceae
      - - - Nephrolepidaceae
          - Lomariopsidaceae
        - - Tectariaceae
          - - Oleandraceae
            - - Davalliaceae
              - Polypodiaceae

Internal phylogeny

- Oleandra
  - - O. distenta
    - - O. articulata
      - - O. decurrens
        - O. pilosa
  - - - O. neriiformis
      - O. pistillaris
    - - - O. sibbaldii
        - O. wallichii
      - - O. cumingii
        - O. musifolia
