= Lonchitis =

Scientific classification
- Kingdom: Plantae
- Clade: Tracheophytes
- Division: Polypodiophyta
- Class: Polypodiopsida
- Order: Polypodiales
- Suborder: Lindsaeineae
- Family: Lonchitidaceae; Doweld 2006
- Genus: Lonchitis; L. 1753 non Bubani 1901

Type species
- Lonchitis hirsuta L.

Species
- See text

Synonyms
- Anisosorus Trevis. 1851 ex Maxon 1926; Antiosorus Roem. ex Kuhn 1882

Genus of ferns

Lonchitis is a neotropical genus of ferns. It is the sole genus in the family Lonchitidaceae. At one time Lonchitis was placed in the Dennstaedtiaceae, and then transferred to the Lindsaeaceae, before being placed in its own family.

== Phylogeny ==
Plants of the World Online as of As of January 2023 recognizes the following species:

Phylogeny of Lonchitis

- - L. occidentalis Baker 1867
  - - L. currorii (Hooker) Mett. ex Kuhn 1879 [syn. Lonchitis mannii (Baker) Alston 1956]
    - L. hirsuta L. 1753
