= Cystodium sorbifolium =

Scientific classification
- Kingdom: Plantae
- Clade: Tracheophytes
- Division: Polypodiophyta
- Class: Polypodiopsida
- Order: Polypodiales
- Suborder: Lindsaeineae
- Family: Cystodiaceae; J.R.Croft 1986
- Genus: Cystodium; J.Sm. 1841
- Species: C. sorbifolium

Binomial name
- Cystodium sorbifolium (Sm.) J.Sm.

Synonyms
- Cystodiopteris Rauschert 1982

Species of fern

Cystodium is a fern in its own family, Cystodiaceae. It contains a single species: Cystodium sorbifolium (Sm.) J.Sm. 1841. Because it looks like a small tree fern, it had previously been placed in the tree fern family Dicksoniaceae. Subsequent analysis had moved it to the Lindsaeaceae, but the most recent phylogenetic studies have placed it in its own separate family, Cystodiaceae, with a sister relationship to the current Lindsaeaceae. A fossil species of the genus Cystodium sorbifolioides is known from the Cenomanian aged Burmese amber in Myanmar.

== Distribution ==
Cystodium is distributed through lowland rainforests from Borneo to New Guinea and nearby islands, as well as the Solomon Islands.
