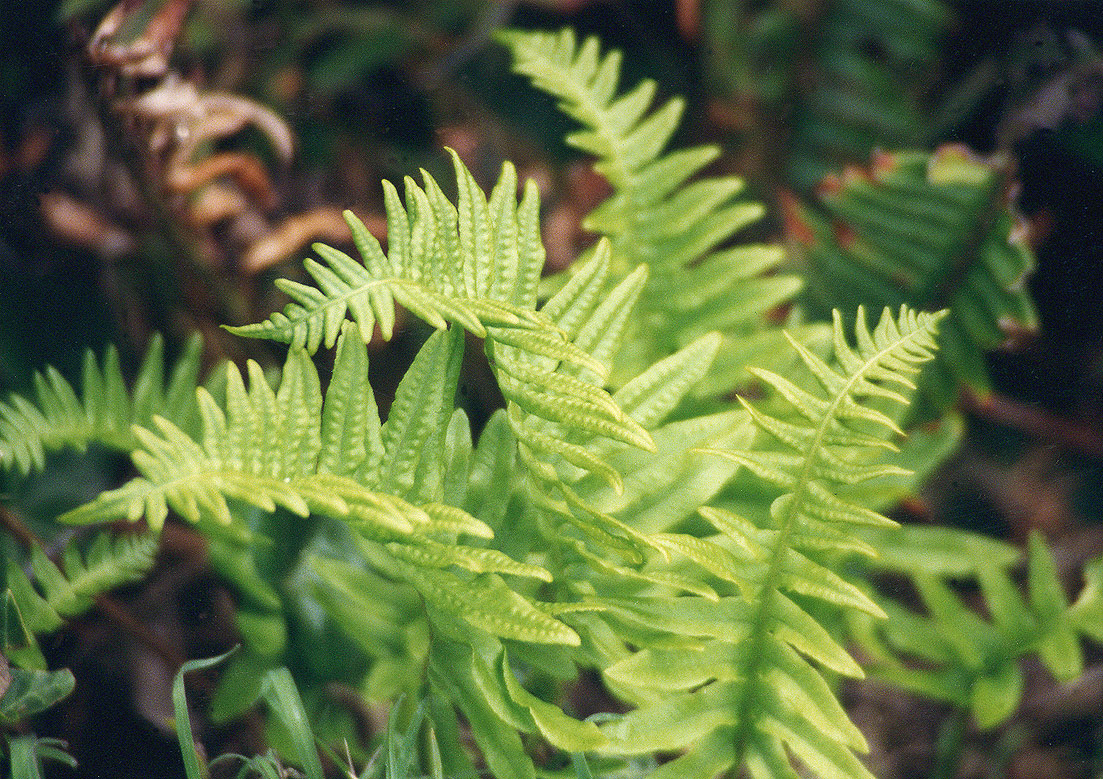
- Polypodium californicum

Scientific classification
- Kingdom: Plantae
- Clade: Tracheophytes
- Division: Polypodiophyta
- Class: Polypodiopsida
- Subclass: Polypodiidae
- Order: Polypodiales; Link (1833)

Suborders
- See text

Synonyms
- Aspleniales Pichi Sermolli ex Reveal 1993; Athyriales Schmakov 2001; Blechnales Pichi Sermolli ex Reveal 1993; Cathetogyratae Bernhardi 1906; Dennstaedtiales Pichi Sermolli 1977 ex Doweld 2001; Dryopteridales Schmakov 2001; Filicales Dumortier 1829 nom. ill. s.s.; Lindsaeales Doweld 2006; Lonchitidales Doweld 2006; Monachosorales Doweld 2006; Negripteridales Pichi Sermolli ex Reveal 1993; Parkeriales Frank 1877; Platyzomatales Pichi Sermolli ex Reveal 1993; Pteridales Burnett 1835 ex Doweld 2001; Saccolomatales Doweld 2006; Thelypteridales Doweld 2001

= Polypodiales =

Polypodiales Temporal range: Late Jurassic–Recent

Order of ferns

The order Polypodiales encompasses the major lineages of polypod ferns, which account for more than 80% of today's fern species. They are found in many parts of the world including tropical, semitropical and temperate areas.

== Description ==
Polypodiales are unique in bearing sporangia with a vertical annulus interrupted by the stalk and stomium. These sporangial characters were used by Johann Jakob Bernhardi to define a group of ferns he called the "Cathetogyratae"; the Pteridophyte Phylogeny Group has suggested reviving this name as the informal term cathetogyrates, to replace the ambiguously circumscribed term "polypods" when referring to the Polypodiales. The sporangia are born on stalks 1–3 cells thick and are often long-stalked. (In contrast, the Hymenophyllales have a stalk composed of four rows of cells.) The sporangia do not reach maturity simultaneously. Many groups in the order lack indusia, but when present, they are attached either along the edge of the indusium or in its center.

Both Polypodiales and Cyatheales differ from other ferns in having a photoreceptor called a neochrome, which allows them to perform photosynthesis better in low-light conditions, such as in the shadows on the forest floor. The common ancestor of the two groups appears to have derived the neochrome via horizontal gene transfer from a hornwort.

Their gametophytes are green, usually heart-shaped, and grow at the surface (rather than underground, as in Ophioglossales).

== Taxonomy ==
The order Polypodiales was first described by Link in 1833. The circumscription of the order has changed over time as ferns have been classified in many different ways (see the review by Christenhusz and Chase, 2014). Smith et al. (2006) carried out the first higher-level pteridophyte classification published in the molecular phylogenetic era. They referred to the ferns (now including horsetails) as monilophytes, dividing them into four groups, with the vast majority of species being placed in a taxon they called "Polypodiopsida". The four-fold grouping has persisted through subsequent systems, despite changes in nomenclature. Polypodiopsida is now used for all ferns (sensu lato), with Smith et al.'s group being subclass Polypodiidae. This group, which includes Polypodiales, is also informally known as the leptosporangiate ferns, while the remaining three groups (subclasses) are referred to as eusporangiate ferns. The Polypodiidae have been divided into seven orders, Polypodiales being the largest. The phylogenetic position of Polypodiales in relation to the other orders of Polypodiidae is shown in the following cladogram.

- Subclass Polypodiidae
  - Osmundales
  - - Hymenophyllales
    - - Gleicheniales
      - - Schizaeales
        - - Salviniales
          - - Cyatheales
            - Polypodiales (6 suborders, 26 families)

=== Evolution ===
Despite being the most diverse order of ferns, they appeared relatively late in the evolutionary history of the group, during the Early Cretaceous, and diversified substantially throughout the period.

=== Subdivision ===
The division of the Polypodiales into families has changed somewhat between the pioneering work of Smith et al. (2006) and the Pteridophyte Phylogeny Group's classification of 2016, with a general increase in the number of divisions recognized, albeit sometimes at different ranks. The table below summarizes four systems; families are listed alphabetically within three broad groups. Although the same families are used in more than one system, circumscriptions may differ. Christenhusz and Chase in 2014 used a very broad circumscription of Aspleniaceae and Polypodiaceae, reducing families used in other systems to subfamilies.

Comparison of alternative subdivisions of Polypodiales
	Smith et al. (2006)	Christenhusz et al. (2011)	Christenhusz & Chase (2014)	PPG I (2016)
Basal families	–	Cystodiaceae	Cystodiaceae	Cystodiaceae
Basal families	Dennstaedtiaceae	Dennstaedtiaceae	Dennstaedtiaceae	Dennstaedtiaceae
Basal families	Lindsaeaceae	Lindsaeaceae	Lindsaeaceae	Lindsaeaceae
Basal families	–	Lonchitidaceae	Lonchitidaceae	Lonchitidaceae
Basal families	Pteridaceae	Pteridaceae	Pteridaceae	Pteridaceae
Basal families	Saccolomataceae	Saccolomataceae	Saccolomataceae	Saccolomataceae
Aspleniineae eupolypods II (Aspleniaceae)	Aspleniaceae	Aspleniaceae	Aspleniaceae: Asplenioideae	Aspleniaceae
Aspleniineae eupolypods II (Aspleniaceae)	–	–	Aspleniaceae: Asplenioideae	Hemidictyaceae
Aspleniineae eupolypods II (Aspleniaceae)	–	Athyriaceae	Aspleniaceae: Athyrioideae	Athyriaceae
Aspleniineae eupolypods II (Aspleniaceae)	–	–	Aspleniaceae: Athyrioideae	Desmophlebiaceae
Aspleniineae eupolypods II (Aspleniaceae)	Blechnaceae	Blechnaceae	Aspleniaceae: Blechnoideae	Blechnaceae
Aspleniineae eupolypods II (Aspleniaceae)	Onocleaceae	Onocleaceae	Aspleniaceae: Blechnoideae	Onocleaceae
Aspleniineae eupolypods II (Aspleniaceae)	–	Cystopteridaceae	Aspleniaceae: Cystopteridoideae	Cystopteridaceae
Aspleniineae eupolypods II (Aspleniaceae)	–	Diplaziopsidaceae	Aspleniaceae: Diplaziopsidoideae	Diplaziopsidaceae
Aspleniineae eupolypods II (Aspleniaceae)	–	Rhachidosoraceae	Aspleniaceae: Rhachidosoroideae	Rhachidosoraceae
Aspleniineae eupolypods II (Aspleniaceae)	Thelypteridaceae	Thelypteridaceae	Aspleniaceae: Thelypteridoideae	Thelypteridaceae
Aspleniineae eupolypods II (Aspleniaceae)	Woodsiaceae	Woodsiaceae	Aspleniaceae: Woodsioideae	Woodsiaceae
Polypodiineae eupolypods I (Polypodiaceae)	Davalliaceae	Davalliaceae	Polypodiaceae: Davallioideae	Davalliaceae
Polypodiineae eupolypods I (Polypodiaceae)	–	–	Polypodiaceae: Didymochlaenoideae	Didymochlaenaceae
Polypodiineae eupolypods I (Polypodiaceae)	Dryopteridaceae	Dryopteridaceae	Polypodiaceae: Dryopteridoideae	Dryopteridaceae
Polypodiineae eupolypods I (Polypodiaceae)	–	Hypodematiaceae	Polypodiaceae: Hypodematioideae	Hypodematiaceae
Polypodiineae eupolypods I (Polypodiaceae)	Lomariopsidaceae	Lomariopsidaceae	Polypodiaceae: Lomariopsidoideae	Lomariopsidaceae
Polypodiineae eupolypods I (Polypodiaceae)	–	Nephrolepidaceae	Polypodiaceae: Lomariopsidoideae	Nephrolepidaceae
Polypodiineae eupolypods I (Polypodiaceae)	Oleandraceae	Oleandraceae	Polypodiaceae: Oleandroideae	Oleandraceae
Polypodiineae eupolypods I (Polypodiaceae)	Polypodiaceae	Polypodiaceae	Polypodiaceae: Polypodioideae	Polypodiaceae
Polypodiineae eupolypods I (Polypodiaceae)	Tectariaceae	Tectariaceae	Polypodiaceae: Tectarioideae	Tectariaceae

Smith et al. (2006) divided the Polypodiales into fifteen families, a practice continued in their 2008 revision, with members of the eupolypods placed in two unranked clades. The families are listed in the table. While many of these families had previously been recognized with similar circumscriptions, the authors noted that Dryopteridaceae was more narrowly bounded than in historical circumscriptions, which had included their Tectariaceae, Onocleaceae and Woodsiaceae. The circumscription of Lomariopsidaceae changed dramatically, with most historical genera of that family (except Lomariopsis and Thysanosoria) being moved to Dryopteridaceae, while Cyclopeltis and Nephrolepis were added. Saccolomataceae were removed from the dennstaedtioids. Cystodium was tentatively placed in Lindsaeaceae, away from its historical position with the tree ferns. Woodsiaceae was acknowledged to be of uncertain circumscription and perhaps paraphyletic; the inclusion of Hypodematium, Didymochlaena, and Leucostegia perhaps also rendering Dryopteridaceae paraphyletic. The grammitids were included in Polypodiaceae to render that family monophyletic.

The linear sequence of Christenhusz et al. (2011), intended for compatibility with the classification of Chase and Reveal (2009), incorporated new phylogenetic evidence to make several changes at the familial level, resulting in an expansion to 23 families. Lonchitis and Cystodium were removed from the Lindsaeaceae and incorporated into new families, Lonchitidaceae and Cystodiaceae respectively. Within eupolypods I, Woodsiaceae proved to be paraphyletic and was reduced to the genera Cheilanthopsis, Hymenocystis, and Woodsia, while the remainder of its genera were removed to Cystopteridaceae, Diplaziopsidaceae, Rhachidosoraceae, Athyriaceae, and Hemidictyaceae. Within eupolypods II, Nephrolepis was placed in a new family, the Nephrolepidaceae, due to uncertainty in its phylogenetic placement, while Hypodematiaceae was split from Dryopteridaceae to contain the three problematic genera mentioned by Smith et al.

The classification of Christenhusz and Chase (2014) dramatically reduced the number of families recognized in this order to eight by "lumping", reducing many families to subfamilies and expanding the circumscription of Polypodiaceae and Aspleniaceae to encompass all of eupolypods I and eupolypods II, respectively. Former families became subfamilies (see the table above). The former Hemidictyaceae were included in the Asplenioideae, and the Onocleaceae in the Blechnoideae. In the new Polypodiaceae, Didymochlaena was placed in its own subfamily, Didymochlaenoideae.

The PPG I classification (2016) used a process intermediate between the two previous approaches, by introducing a new rank, that of suborder, and organising 26 families (in some cases very narrowly circumscribed) into six suborders, largely returning to the families set out by Christenhusz et al. in 2011. In lieu of the expansion of Aspleniaceae and Polypodiaceae, eupolypods I and II were recognized and named as suborders:

- Saccolomatineae includes the single family Saccolomataceae.
- Lindsaeinae corresponds to the Lindseaceae of Smith et al., and includes the Cystodiaceae, Lindsaeaceae, and Lonchitidaceae. It is probably not monophyletic.
- Pteridineae includes the single family Pteridaceae.
- Dennstaedtiineae includes the single family Dennstaedtiaceae.
- Aspleniinae (formerly eupolypods I) includes the families Cystopteridaceae, Rhachidosoraceae, Diplaziopsidaceae, Desmophlebiaceae (containing only Desmophlebium), Hemidictyaceae, Aspleniaceae, Woodsiaceae, Onocleaceae, Blechnaceae, Athyriaceae, and Thelypteridaceae.
- Polypodiineae (formerly eupolypods II) includes the families Didymochlaenaceae (containing only Didymochlaena), Hypodematiaceae, Dryopteridaceae, Lomariopsidaceae, Nephrolepidaceae, Tectariaceae, Oleandraceae, Davalliaceae, and Polypodiaceae.

=== Phylogeny ===
Pteridophyte Phylogeny Group 2016

- Polypodiales
  - - Saccolomataceae
    - - Cystodiaceae
      - - Lonchitidaceae
        - Lindsaeaceae
  - - Pteridaceae
    - - Dennstaedtiaceae
      - eupolypods
        - Aspleniineae eupolypods II
          - Cystopteridaceae
          - - - Rhachidosoraceae
              - - Diplaziopsidaceae
                - - Desmophlebiaceae
                  - - Hemidictyaceae
                    - Aspleniaceae
            - - Thelypteridaceae
              - - Woodsiaceae
                - - Athyriaceae
                  - - Onocleaceae
                    - Blechnaceae
        - Polypodiineae eupolypods I
          - Didymochlaenaceae
          - - Hypodematiaceae
            - - Dryopteridaceae
              - - - Nephrolepidaceae
                  - Lomariopsidaceae
                - - Tectariaceae
                  - - Oleandraceae
                    - - Davalliaceae
                      - Polypodiaceae

Nitta et al. 2022 and Fern Tree of life

- - - Saccolomatineae
      Saccolomataceae
    - Lindsaeineae
      - Cystodiaceae
      - - Lonchitidaceae
        - Lindsaeaceae
  - - - Pteridineae
        Pteridaceae
    - - Dennstaedtiineae
        Dennstaedtiaceae
      - eupolypods
        - Aspleniineae eupolypods II
          - Cystopteridaceae
          - - - Rhachidosoraceae
              - - Diplaziopsidaceae
                - - - Desmophlebiaceae
                    - Hemidictyaceae
                  - Aspleniaceae
            - - Thelypteridaceae
              - - Woodsiaceae
                - - - Onocleaceae
                    - Blechnaceae
                  - Athyriaceae
        - Polypodiineae eupolypods I
          - Hypodematiaceae
          - - Didymochlaenaceae
            - - Dryopteridaceae
              - - Lomariopsidaceae
                - - Nephrolepidaceae
                  - - Tectariaceae
                    - - Oleandraceae
                      - - Davalliaceae
                        - Polypodiaceae

=== Obsolete families ===
Now-obsolete families of Polypodiales include:

- Drynariaceae - now in Polypodiaceae
- Grammitidaceae - now in Polypodiaceae
- Gymnogrammitidaceae - now in Polypodiaceae
- Loxogrammaceae - now in Polypodiaceae
- Platyceriaceae - now in Polypodiaceae
- Pleursoriopsidaceae - now in Polypodiaceae
- Vittariaceae - now in Pteridaceae

=== Evolution ===
Polypodiales may be regarded as one of the most evolutionarily advanced orders of monilophytes (ferns), based on recent genetic analysis. They arose and diversified about 100 million years ago, probably subsequent to the diversification of the angiosperms.

== Bibliography ==
- Bernhardi, J. Jacob (1806). "Dritter Versuch einer Anordnung der Farrnkräuter". Neues Journal für die Botanik (in German). 1 (2): 1–50.
- Chase, Mark W.; Reveal, James L. (2009). "A phylogenetic classification of the land plants to accompany APG III". Botanical Journal of the Linnean Society. 161 (2): 122–127. doi:10.1111/j.1095-8339.2009.01002.x.
- Christenhusz, M. J. M.; Zhang, X. C.; Schneider, H. (18 February 2011). "A linear sequence of extant families and genera of lycophytes and ferns". Phytotaxa. 19 (1): 7. doi:10.11646/phytotaxa.19.1.2. hdl:10138/28042.
- Christenhusz, Maarten J.M.; Chase, Mark W. (2014). "Trends and concepts in fern classification". Annals of Botany. 113 (4): 571–594. doi:10.1093/aob/mct299. PMC 3936591. PMID 24532607.
- Christenhusz, Maarten JM & Byng, J. W. (2016). "The number of known plants species in the world and its annual increase". Phytotaxa. 261 (3): 201–217. doi:10.11646/phytotaxa.261.3.1.
- Lehtonen, Samuli (2011). "Towards Resolving the Complete Fern Tree of Life". PLoS ONE. 6 (10) e24851. Bibcode:2011PLoSO...624851L. doi:10.1371/journal.pone.0024851. PMC 3192703. PMID 22022365.
- Pryer, Kathleen M.; Schneider, Harald; Smith, Alan R.; Cranfill, Raymond; Wolf, Paul G.; Hunt, Jeffrey S.; Sipes, Sedonia D. (2001). "Horsetails and ferns are a monophyletic group and the closest living relatives to seed plants". Nature. 409 (6820): 618–622. Bibcode:2001Natur.409..618S. doi:10.1038/35054555. PMID 11214320. S2CID 4367248.
- Pteridophyte Phylogeny Group (November 2016). "A community-derived classification for extant lycophytes and ferns". Journal of Systematics and Evolution. 54 (6): 563–603. doi:10.1111/jse.12229. S2CID 39980610.
- Ranker, Tom A.; Haufler, Christopher H., eds. (2008). Biology and Evolution of Ferns and Lycophytes. Cambridge University Press. ISBN 978-0-521-87411-3.
- Schneider, Harald; Schuettpelz, Eric; Pryer, Kathleen M.; Cranfill, Raymond; Magallón, Susana; Lupia, Richard (1 April 2004). "Ferns diversified in the shadow of angiosperms". Nature. 428 (6982): 553–557. Bibcode:2004Natur.428..553S. doi:10.1038/nature02361. PMID 15058303.
- Schneider, Harald; Smith, Alan R.; Pryer, Kathleen M. (1 July 2009). "Is Morphology Really at Odds with Molecules in Estimating Fern Phylogeny?". Systematic Botany. 34 (3): 455–475. doi:10.1600/036364409789271209. S2CID 85855934.
- Smith, Alan R.; Kathleen M. Pryer; Eric Schuettpelz; Petra Korall; Harald Schneider; Paul G. Wolf (2006). "A classification for extant ferns" (PDF). Taxon. 55 (3): 705–731. doi:10.2307/25065646. JSTOR 25065646.
- Smith, Alan R.; Pryer, Kathleen M.; Schuettpelz, Eric; Korall, Petra; Schneider, Harald; Wolf, Paul G. Fern classification (PDF). pp. 417–467., in Ranker & Haufler (2008)
- Li, F. W.; Villarreal, J. C.; Kelly, S.; Rothfels, C. J.; Melkonian, M.; Frangedakis, E.; Ruhsam, M.; Sigel, E. M.; Der, J. P.; Pittermann, J.; Burge, D. O.; Pokorny, L.; Larsson, A.; Chen, T.; Weststrand, S.; Thomas, P.; Carpenter, E.; Zhang, Y.; Tian, Z.; Chen, L.; Yan, Z.; Zhu, Y.; Sun, X.; Wang, J.; Stevenson, D. W.; Crandall-Stotler, B. J.; Shaw, A. J.; Deyholos, M. K.; Soltis, D. E.; et al. (2014). "Horizontal transfer of an adaptive chimeric photoreceptor from bryophytes to ferns". Proceedings of the National Academy of Sciences of the United States of America. 111 (18): 6672–6677. Bibcode:2014PNAS..111.6672L. doi:10.1073/pnas.1319929111. PMC 4020063. PMID 24733898.
- Eric Schuettpelz. The evolution and diversification of epiphytic ferns. PhD Thesis Duke University 2007
- Michael Hassler and Brian Swale. Checklist of Ferns and Fern Allies 2001
- Australian National Botanic Gardens. A classification of the ferns and their allies
