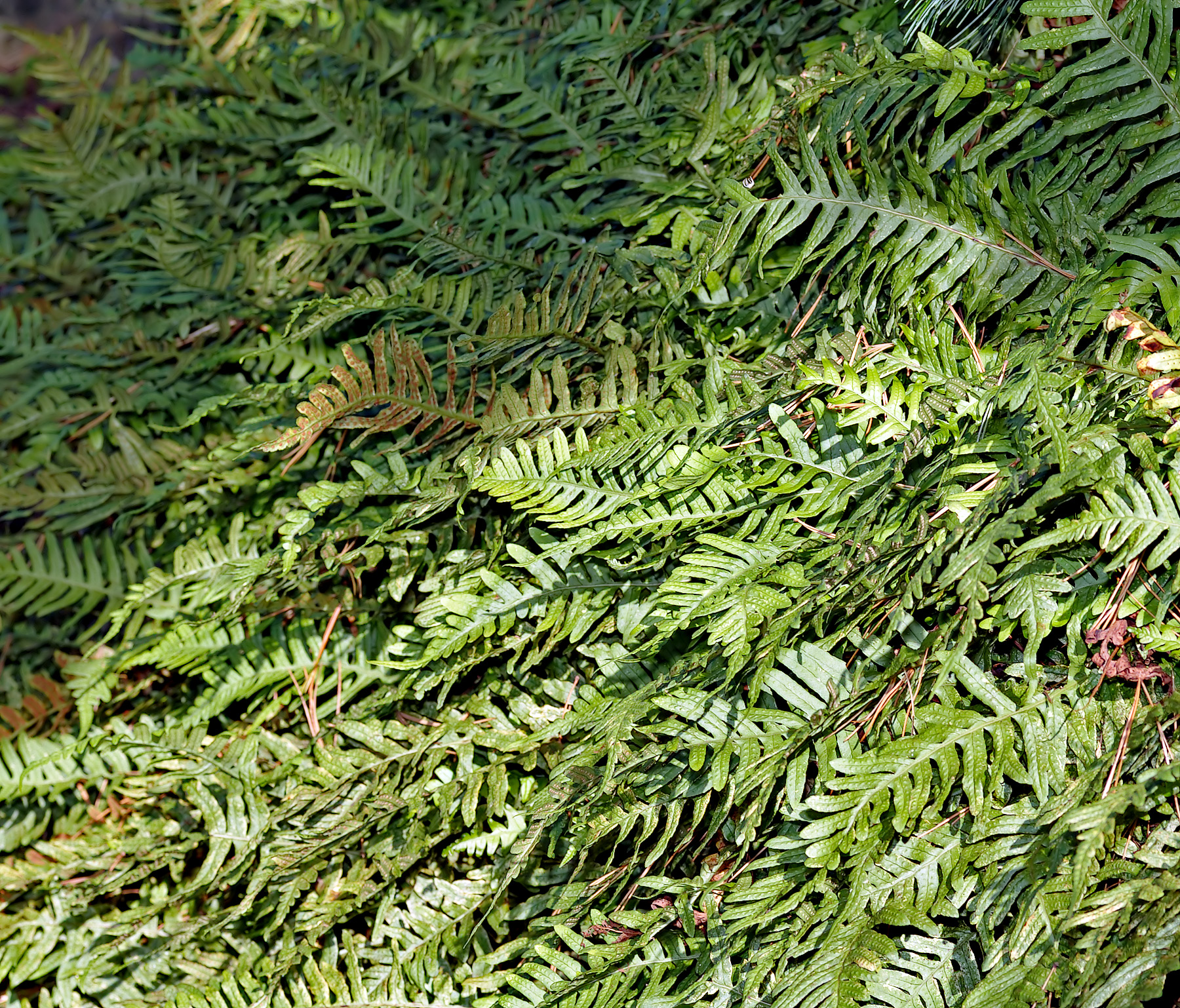
- Common Polypody, Polypodium vulgare

Scientific classification
- Kingdom: Plantae
- Clade: Tracheophytes
- Division: Polypodiophyta
- Class: Polypodiopsida
- Order: Polypodiales
- Suborder: Polypodiineae; Dumort.

Families
- Davalliaceae M.R.Schomb.; Didymochlaenaceae Ching ex Li Bing Zhang & Liang Zhang; Dryopteridaceae Herter; Hypodematiaceae Ching; Lomariopsidaceae Alston; Nephrolepidaceae Pic.Serm.; Oleandraceae Ching ex Pic.Serm.; Polypodiaceae J.Presl & C.Presl; Tectariaceae Panigrahi

= Polypodiineae =

Suborder of ferns

Polypodiineae is a suborder of ferns in the order Polypodiales. It is equivalent to the clade eupolypods I in earlier systems, and to the very broadly defined family Polypodiaceae in the classification of Christenhusz & Chase (2014). It probably diverged from the suborder Aspleniineae (eupolypods II) during the mid-Cretaceous. The divergence is supported by both molecular data and an often overlooked morphological characteristic which lies in the vasculature of the petiole. Most species that make up the suborder have three vascular bundles. The only exceptions are the grammitid ferns which have one, and the genus Hypodematium which has two. This differs from eupolypods II which mostly have two vascular bundles (except the well-nested blechnoid ferns which generally have at least three).

== Taxonomy ==
In the Pteridophyte Phylogeny Group classification of 2016 (PPG I), the group is treated as the suborder Polypodiineae, and divided into 11 families. Alternatively, it may be treated as a single, very broadly circumscribed family Polypodiaceae sensu lato, which is then divided into subfamilies. The relationship between the two approaches is shown in the table below.

PPG I	Christenhusz & Chase (2014)
Suborder Polypodiineae Dumort.	Family Polypodiaceae J.Presl & C.Presl
Family Didymochlaenaceae Ching ex Li Bing Zhang & Liang Zhang	Subfamily Didymochlaenoideae Christenh.
Family Hypodematiaceae Ching	Subfamily Hypodematioideae Christenh.
Family Dryopteridaceae Herter	Subfamily Dryopteridoideae Link
Family Nephrolepidaceae Pic.Serm.	Subfamily Lomariopsidoideae Crabbe, Jermy & Mickel
Family Lomariopsidaceae Alston	Subfamily Lomariopsidoideae Crabbe, Jermy & Mickel
Family Tectariaceae Panigrahi	Subfamily Tectarioideae B.K.Nayar
Family Oleandraceae Ching ex Pic.Serm.	Subfamily Oleandroideae Crabbe, Jermy & Mickel
Family Davalliaceae M.R.Schomb.	Subfamily Davallioideae Hook.
Family Polypodiaceae J.Presl & C.Presl	Subfamily Polypodioideae B.K.Nayar

=== Phylogeny ===
The Polypodiineae is one of two major groups of eupolypod families, treated as suborders, within the order Polypodiales. In 2016, the Pteridophyte Phylogeny Group published a consensus cladogram, based on "numerous phylogenetic studies" between 2001 and 2015. The location of the Polypodiineae within the order Polypodiales in this cladogram is:

- Polypodiales
  - four basal families
  - - Pteridaceae
    - - Dennstaedtiaceae
      - eupolypods
        - Aspleniineae (eupolypods II)
        - Polypodiineae (eupolypods I)

To the level of families, the subtree for the Polypodiineae is:

- Polypodiineae
  - Didymochlaenaceae (1 genus)
  - - Hypodematiaceae (2 genera)
    - - Dryopteridaceae (26 genera)
      - - - Nephrolepidaceae (1 genus)
          - Lomariopsidaceae (4 genera)
        - - Tectariaceae (7 genera)
          - - Oleandraceae (1 genus)
            - - Davalliaceae (1 genus)
              - Polypodiaceae (65 genera)

Of the 108 genera in the suborder, 91 (84%) are placed in two families, Dryopteridaceae and Polypodiaceae.
