= Mickelia =

Scientific classification
- Kingdom: Plantae
- Clade: Tracheophytes
- Division: Polypodiophyta
- Class: Polypodiopsida
- Order: Polypodiales
- Suborder: Polypodiineae
- Family: Dryopteridaceae
- Subfamily: Elaphoglossoideae
- Genus: Mickelia; R.C.Moran, Labiak, & Sundue

Type species
- Mickelia nicotianifolia (Olof Swartz) R.C.Moran, Labiak, & Sundue

Species
- See text.

Genus of ferns

Mickelia is a genus of ferns in the family Dryopteridaceae, subfamily Elaphoglossoideae, in the Pteridophyte Phylogeny Group classification of 2016 (PPG I). It is one of the six genera of bolbitidoid ferns and is sister to the very large genus Elaphoglossum. It consists of about 10 species. All are native to the neotropics.

== Description ==
Hemiepiphytic or terrestrial ferns. Rhizomes dorsiventral, the ventral meristele elongate in cross section. Phyllopodia absent. Leaves articulate at base or continuous with the rhizome, dimorphic as sporophylls and trophophylls, the sporophylls having longer petioles and smaller pinnae. Fronds never differentiated into bathyphylls and acrophylls as in the bolbitidoid genera Lomagramma, Arthrobotrya, and Teratophyllum. Fronds singly pinnate or bipinnate with a single, free, basal segment on each of the basal pinnae. Pinnae articulate or continuous with the rachis; terminal pinna conform (similar in size and shape to the lateral pinnae). Veins variously anastomosing (not free); veinlets usually included in the areoles. Sori acrostichoid (covering the entire abaxial surface of the leaf); Paraphyses absent. Spores monolete.

=== Comparative anatomy ===
No single character is known to distinguish Mickelia from Bolbitis, but the rhizomes of five species of Mickelia have been examined and found to have ground tissue that is greenish, instead of the whitish color found in most ferns. The greenish rhizome ground tissue might be a synapomorphy for Mickelia. Seven species of Mickelia are hemiepiphytes, whereas all of the Bolbitis species are terrestrial. The location of vegetative buds, when present, is different in the two genera.

== Taxonomy ==
The genus Mickelia was erected in 2010, following a molecular phylogenetic study of the bolbitidoid ferns, based on DNA sequences of the chloroplast intergenic spacers trnL-F and rps4-trnS. Mickelia was named for the American pteridologist John Thomas Mickel, who contributed much regarding Elaphoglossum, the closest relative of Mickelia.

Six species of Mickelia had previously been in the genus Bolbitis. Mickelia pradoi and Mickelia furcata were first described in the paper that established Mickelia. Mickelia scandens was resurrected from Mickelia guianensis, which had previously been in Lomagramma because of its venation pattern. These two had been treated as a single species since the time when they were both in the genus Acrostichum. For this reason, the most recent species name that had been applied to Mickelia scandens was Acrostichum scandens.

The species that had been in Bolbitis were described in a monograph of that genus in 1977. The mesoamerican species of Bolbitis were given an updated treatment in 1995 and detailed biogeographic information for these was published in 2004. Mickelia was first described in a synopsis of the genus that did not repeat much of the information published in previous works.

=== Phylogeny ===
The phylogenetic tree below is based on one that was published in 2010. The positions of Mickelia pradoi and Mickelia lindigii are based on morphology only. Mickelia furcata and Mickelia pergamentacea are omitted because they have not been sampled for DNA and morphology does not clearly indicate their affinities. Mickelia furcata is known from only one specimen collected in 1985 and lacking fertile fronds.

- Mickelia
  - - Mickelia guianensis
    - - Mickelia scandens
      - Mickelia pradoi
  - - - Mickelia bernoullii
      - Mickelia lindigii
    - - Mickelia nicotianifolia
      - - Mickelia hemiotis
        - Mickelia oligarchica

=== Species ===
As of November 2026, the Checklist of Ferns and Lycophytes of the World, World Flora Online, and Plants of the World Online all accepted the following ten species and one hybrid in Mickelia:

- Mickelia bernoullii (Kuhn ex Christ) R.C.Moran, Labiak & Sundue
- Mickelia furcata R.C.Moran, Labiak & Sundue
- Mickelia guianensis (Aubl.) R.C.Moran, Labiak & Sundue
- Mickelia hemiotis (Maxon) R.C.Moran, Labiak & Sundue
- Mickelia lindigii (Mett.) R.C.Moran, Labiak & Sundue
- Mickelia nicotianifolia (Sw.) R.C.Moran, Labiak & Sundue
- Mickelia oligarchica (Baker) R.C.Moran, Labiak & Sundue
- Mickelia pergamentacea (Maxon) R.C.Moran, Labiak & Sundue
- Mickelia pradoi R.C.Moran, Labiak & Sundue
- Mickelia scandens (Raddi) R.C.Moran, Labiak & Sundue
- Mickelia × atrans R.C.Moran, Labiak & Sundue
