= Mickelia nicotianifolia =

Scientific classification
- Kingdom: Plantae
- Clade: Tracheophytes
- Division: Polypodiophyta
- Class: Polypodiopsida
- Order: Polypodiales
- Suborder: Polypodiineae
- Family: Dryopteridaceae
- Genus: Mickelia
- Species: M. nicotianifolia

Binomial name
- Mickelia nicotianifolia (Sw.) R.C.Moran, Labiak & Sundue

Synonyms
- Acrostichum acuminatum Willd.; Acrostichum nicotianifolium Sw.; Anapausia acuminata (Willd.) C.Presl; Anapausia nicotianifolium (Sw.) C.Presl; Aspidium sodiroi (Baker) Hieron.; Bolbitis killipii (Maxon) Lellinger; Bolbitis riparia R.C.Moran & B.Øllg.; Bolbitis nicotianifolia (Sw.) Alston; Chrysodium acuminatum (Willd.) Mett.; Chrysodium nicotianifolium (Sw.) Mett.; Gymnopteris acuminata (Willd.) C.Presl; Gymnopteris nicotianifolia (Sw.) C.Presl; Leptochilus killipii Maxon; Leptochilus nicotianifolius (Sw.) C.Chr.; Nephrodium sodiroi Baker; Tectaria sodiroi (Baker) Maxon

Species of fern

Mickelia nicotianifolia is a species of fern in the family Dryopteridaceae, subfamily Elaphoglossoideae. It has a widespread distribution in Central America and northern South America.

== Taxonomy ==
The species was first described by Olof Swartz in 1806 as Acrostichum nicotianifolium. It has since been placed in several other genera, including Mickelia. In 1995, Robbin C. Moran and Benjamin Øllgaard described a new species from Ecuador as Bolbitis riparia. Under this name, it was considered to be endemic to Ecuador and threatened. However, in 2010, Moran et al. treated Bolbitis riparia as a synonym of Mickelia nicotianifolia, a widespread species.
