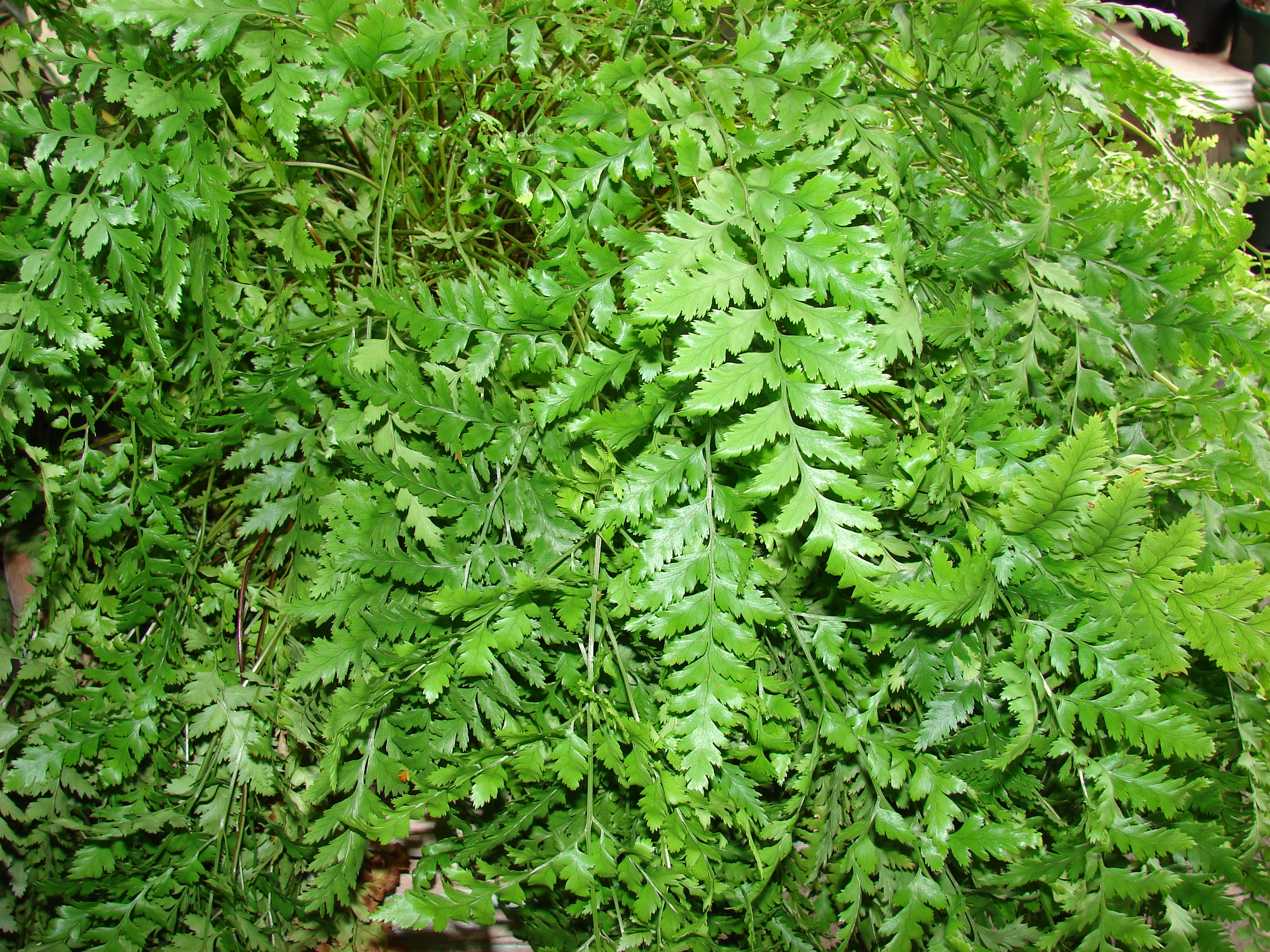

Conservation status
- Least Concern (IUCN 3.1)

- Apparently Secure (NatureServe)

Scientific classification
- Kingdom: Plantae
- Clade: Tracheophytes
- Division: Polypodiophyta
- Class: Polypodiopsida
- Order: Polypodiales
- Suborder: Polypodiineae
- Family: Dryopteridaceae
- Genus: Rumohra
- Species: R. adiantiformis

Binomial name
- Rumohra adiantiformis (G.Forst.) Ching

= Rumohra adiantiformis =

Species of fern

Rumohra adiantiformis, the leather fern or leatherleaf fern, is a species of fern in the wood fern family Dryopteridaceae. It has a wide distribution, mainly in the tropical Southern Hemisphere.

== Names ==
Other common names include leathery shieldfern, iron fern, 7-weeks-fern, and climbing shield fern.

== Description ==
Growing to 90 cm (35 in) tall and broad, Rumohra adiantiformis is a bushy, tufted evergreen plant with glossy dark green fronds. These contain round sori (reproductive clusters) on the underside of the pinnae (leaflets) unlike many other ferns which have separate specialized reproductive fronds. Many of the sori have protective peltate indusia (films), and prominent scales on the stipes of the fronds.

== Distribution ==
Rumohra adiantiformis is native to South America, the Caribbean, southern Africa, the Western Indian Ocean islands, Papua New Guinea, and Australasia. Countries it is native to include such diverse places as Brazil and Colombia, the Galápagos Islands, the Greater Antilles in the Caribbean, Zimbabwe and South Africa Australia, and New Zealand.

== Ecology ==
An example of plant associations of Rumohra adiantiformis is found in the Westland podocarp/broadleaf forests of New Zealand, with flora associates including Ascarina lucida, Pseudowintera colorata, Neopanax colensoi, Alsophila smithii, and Blechnum discolor.

== Cultivation ==
The fern is cultivated as an ornamental plant for groundcover and in floristry. As it is a tropical plant with only limited protection against frost, in temperate climates it is normally grown under glass as a houseplant. In the UK it has gained the Royal Horticultural Society's Award of Garden Merit.

It is of economic importance in Brazil, where thousands of people generate their income by wild-harvesting and selling the fronds for use in flower arrangements.

== Conservation status ==
This plant has been classified by the New Zealand Department of Conservation as being "Not Threatened" under the New Zealand Threat Classification System.
