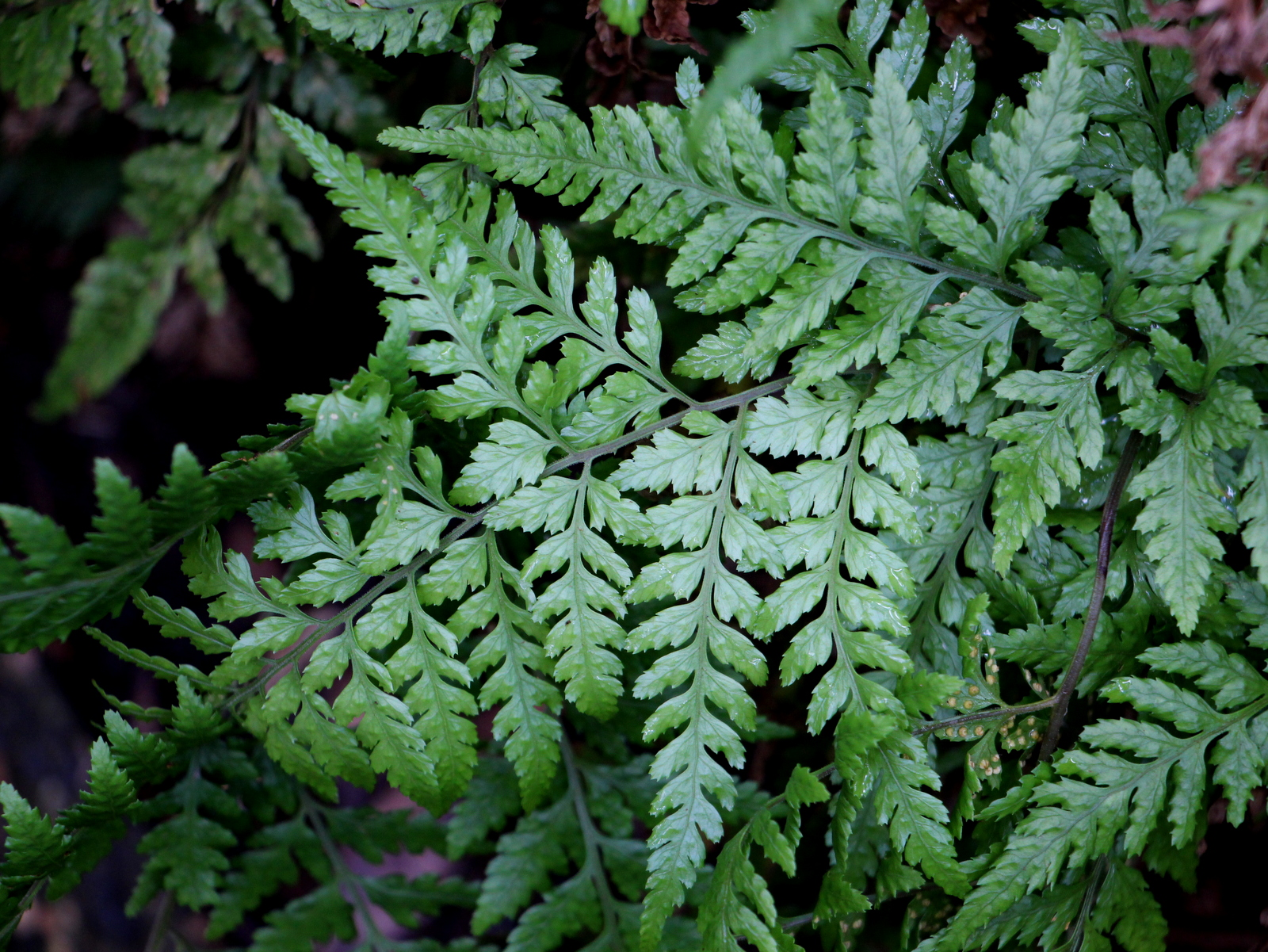

Scientific classification
- Kingdom: Plantae
- Clade: Tracheophytes
- Division: Polypodiophyta
- Class: Polypodiopsida
- Order: Polypodiales
- Suborder: Polypodiineae
- Family: Dryopteridaceae
- Genus: Parapolystichum
- Species: P. acuminatum

Binomial name
- Parapolystichum acuminatum (Houlston) Labiak, Sundue & R.C.Moran

Synonyms
- Lastreopsis acuminata (Houlston) C.V.Morton; Lastreopsis shepherdii (Kuntze ex Mett.) Tindale

= Parapolystichum acuminatum =

Species of fern

Parapolystichum acuminatum, synonym Lastreopsis acuminata, is a small plant found in eastern Australia. Common names include creeping shield fern, glossy shield fern and shiny shield fern. It is a widespread fern, often seen in wet eucalyptus forest or rainforest, usually near streams.
