= Polybotrya andina =

Conservation status
- Vulnerable (IUCN 3.1)

Scientific classification
- Kingdom: Plantae
- Clade: Tracheophytes
- Division: Polypodiophyta
- Class: Polypodiopsida
- Order: Polypodiales
- Suborder: Polypodiineae
- Family: Dryopteridaceae
- Genus: Polybotrya
- Species: P. andina

Binomial name
- Polybotrya andina C.Chr.

Species of fern

Polybotrya andina is a species of fern in the family Dryopteridaceae. It is native to Ecuador and Peru. Its natural habitats are subtropical or tropical moist lowland forests and subtropical or tropical moist montane forests. It is threatened by habitat loss.
