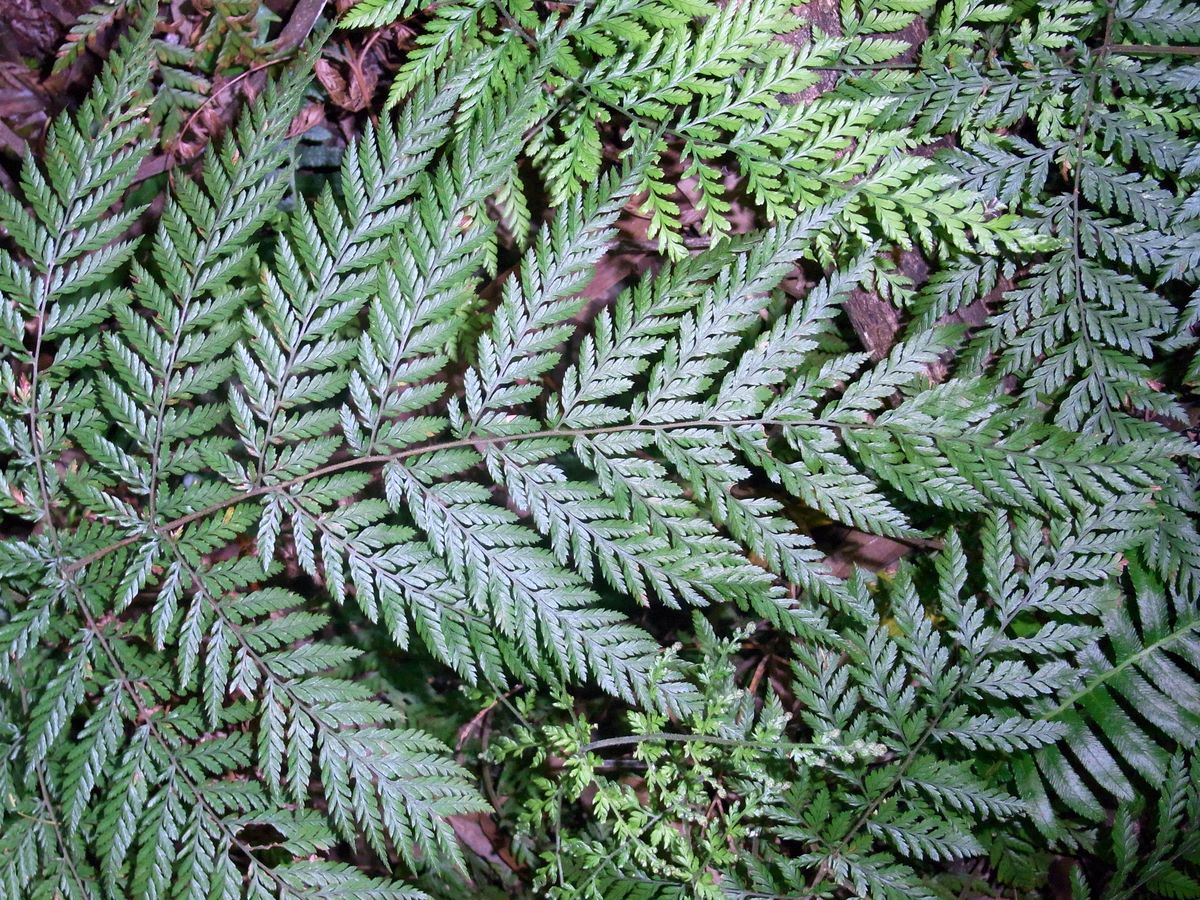
- Mount Kembla, Australia

Scientific classification
- Kingdom: Plantae
- Clade: Tracheophytes
- Division: Polypodiophyta
- Class: Polypodiopsida
- Order: Polypodiales
- Suborder: Polypodiineae
- Family: Dryopteridaceae
- Genus: Parapolystichum
- Species: P. microsorum

Binomial name
- Parapolystichum microsorum (Endl.) Labiak, Sundue & R.C.Moran

Synonyms
- P. microsorum subsp. microsorum: Aspidium acuminatum var. villosum Bailey; Aspidium microsorum (Endl.) Kaulf.; Lastreopsis microsora (Endl.) Tindale; Dryopteris albovillosa Watts; Dryopteris baileyana Domin; Lastrea microsora (Endl.) C.Presl; Nephrodium microsorum Endl.; P. microsorum subsp. pentagulare: Aspidium pentangularum (Colenso) Colenso; Ctenitis pentangularis (Colenso) Alston; Nephrodium pentangularum Colenso

= Parapolystichum microsorum =

Species of fern

Parapolystichum microsorum, synonym (in part) Lastreopsis microsora, known as the creeping shield fern is a common small plant found in eastern Australia and New Zealand. The habitat is rainforest or moist sheltered eucalyptus forests. It may form large colonies. The specific epithet microsora translates to "small sori".

== Subspecies ==
Two subspecies are recognized:

- Parapolystichum microsorum subsp. microsorum – Australia (eastern Queensland, eastern New South Wales and eastern Victoria), Norfolk Island
- Parapolystichum microsorum subsp. pentagulare (Colenso) Labiak, Sundue & R. C. Moran – New Zealand and Chatham Island
