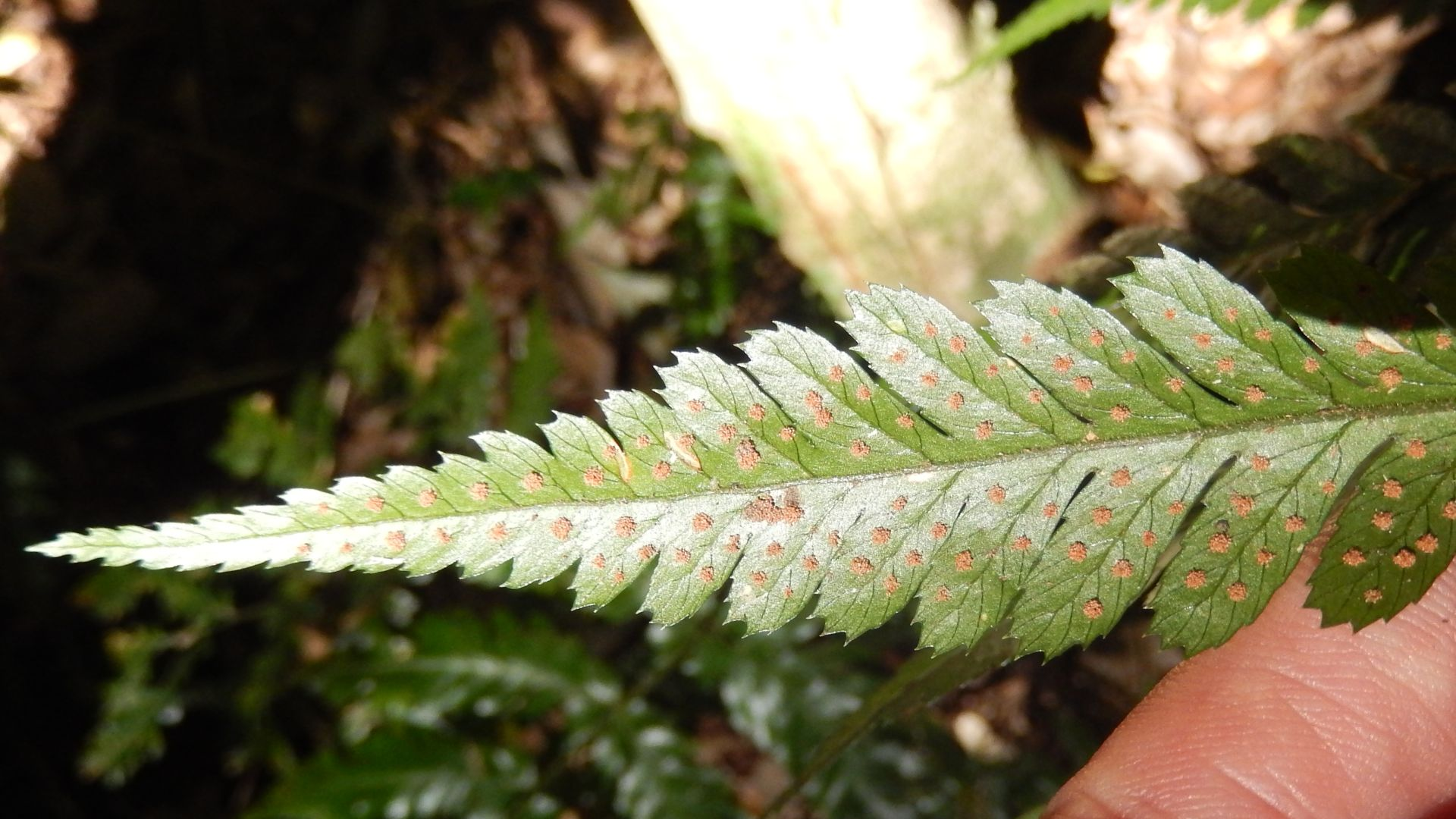
- League scrub, Australia

Scientific classification
- Kingdom: Plantae
- Clade: Tracheophytes
- Division: Polypodiophyta
- Class: Polypodiopsida
- Order: Polypodiales
- Suborder: Polypodiineae
- Family: Dryopteridaceae
- Genus: Parapolystichum
- Species: P. munita

Binomial name
- Parapolystichum munita (Mett.) Labiak, Sundue & R.C.Moran

Synonyms
- Lastreopsis munita (Mett.) Tindale; Phegopteris munita Mett.; Polypodium aspidioides F.M.Bailey

= Parapolystichum munitum =

naked shield fern

Species of fern

Parapolystichum munitum, synonym Lastreopsis munita, the naked shield fern is a plant found in tropical and subtropical forest areas in eastern Australia. Often seen in large colonies, near streams in rainforest and wet eucalyptus areas, north from the Barrington Tops.
