= Dryopteris shibipedis =

Scientific classification
- Kingdom: Plantae
- Clade: Embryophytes
- Clade: Tracheophytes
- Division: Polypodiophyta
- Class: Polypodiopsida
- Order: Polypodiales
- Suborder: Polypodiineae
- Family: Dryopteridaceae
- Genus: Dryopteris
- Species: D. shibipedis

Binomial name
- Dryopteris shibipedis Sa. Kurata

Species of fern

Dryopteris shibpedis is a species of fern native Japan that was declared extinct in 2007, that has since been rediscovered in the Tsukuba Botanical Garden. Despite rediscovery, D. shibipedis is still ranked as extinct in the wild.

== Biological origin and reproduction ==
Originating from the family Dryopteridaceae, or wood ferns, the Dryopteris shibipedis is thought to be a "hybridization between a sexual tetraploid providing a diploid egg and an apogamous diploid providing a diploid sperm." This meaning, the fern itself is considered a tetraploid—having four sets of chromosomes, develops from the mother providing an egg with two sets of chromosomes and the father providing two sets of chromosomes. The two parent plants would be D. kinkiensis (mother species) and D. pacifica (father species). The embryo of the D. shibipedis has been known, however, to develop without fertilization, and can reproduce asexually, therefore ensuring stability across multiple generations.

== Origin, disappearance, and rediscovery ==
This particular species of fern has only been rediscovered in one small place in Japan, having been declared extinct in 2007, then was immediately rebutted due to confirmation of sightings of the fern in the botanical garden in one town in southwest Japan. This particular species is very recent in biological origin, only dating back to 1984 when a sampling of the hybridized species was given to the Tsukuba Botanical Garden by Dr. Y. Shimura, where it was later rediscovered. The species is unlikely to move out of that region for quite some time and will most likely remain small in numbers for a while due to its relative newness to its locale. While the father species with plentiful throughout Japan, the mother species only covers one region of south west Japan, therefore tightening the confines in which D. shibipedis could have been found in the first place.

== Current threats ==
D. shibipedis is currently on a list of 886 endangered pteridophyta taxa around the globe, of which those in the most danger of going extinct are found in Asia.
