= Phanerophlebia =

Phanerophlebia may refer to

- Phanerophlebia (plant) C.Presl 1836, a genus of ferns sometimes included in Polystichum Roth 1800
- Phanerophlebia Diakonoff 1957, a subgenus of Cryptophlebia, which is a genus of moths
