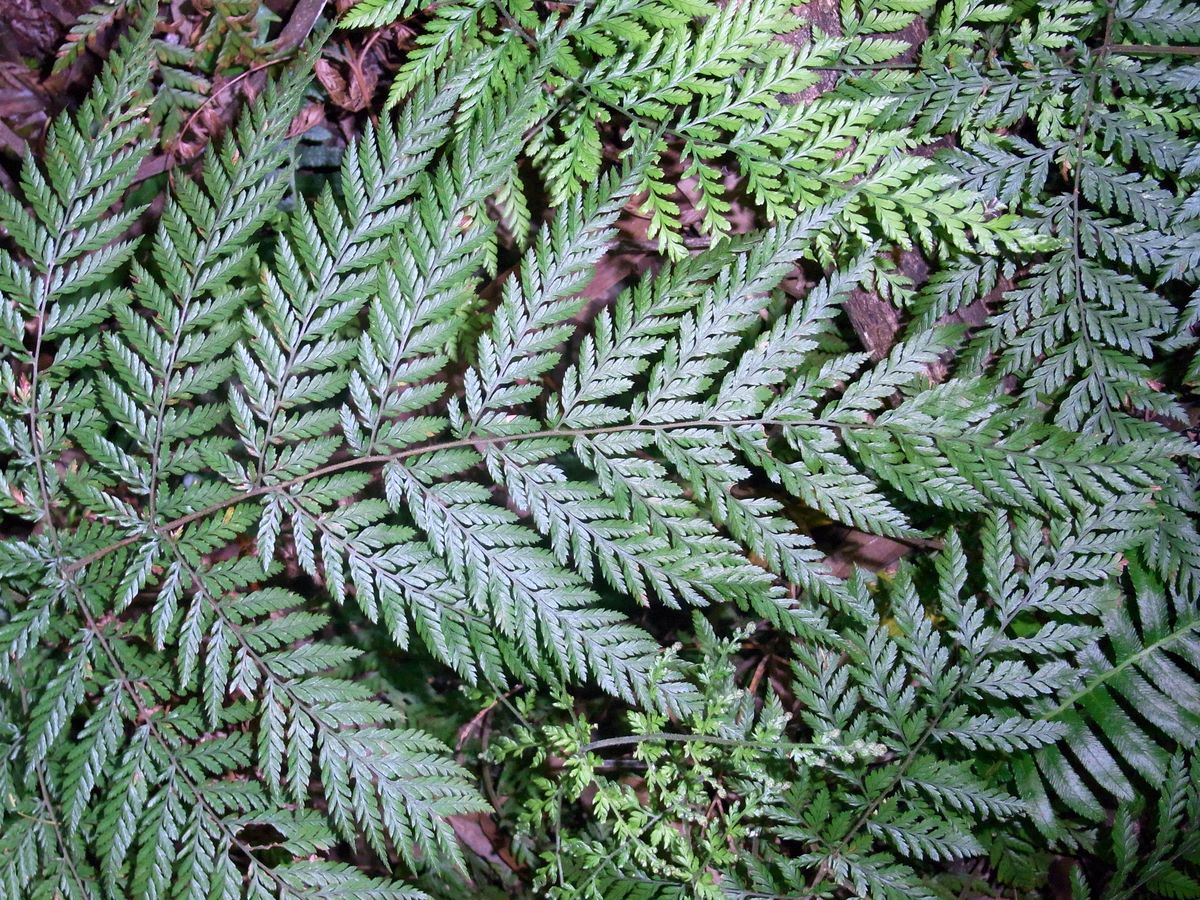
- Parapolystichum microsorum

Scientific classification
- Kingdom: Plantae
- Clade: Tracheophytes
- Division: Polypodiophyta
- Class: Polypodiopsida
- Order: Polypodiales
- Suborder: Polypodiineae
- Family: Dryopteridaceae
- Subfamily: Elaphoglossoideae
- Genus: Parapolystichum (Keyserl.) Ching

Species
- See text.

Synonyms
- Polystichum sect. Parapolystichum Keyserl.

= Parapolystichum =

Genus of ferns

Parapolystichum is a genus of ferns in the family Dryopteridaceae, subfamily Elaphoglossoideae, in the Pteridophyte Phylogeny Group classification of 2016 (PPG I). The genus is mainly native to the tropics, although its range extends to southeastern Australia.

== Taxonomy ==
The taxon was first described as the section Parapolystichum of the genus Polystichum by Keyserling in 1873. It was raised to the rank of genus by Ching in 1940.

=== Species ===
As of October 2026, the Checklist of Ferns and Lycophytes of the World recognized the following 31 species. World Flora Online and Plants of the World Online recognize all but P. nephrodioides, recently transferred from Lastreopsis. In addition, Plants of the World Online recognizes P. pentangulare, without a published combination, as distinct from P. microsorum.

- Parapolystichum acuminatum (Houlston) Labiak, Sundue & R.C.Moran
- Parapolystichum acutum (Kuntze) Labiak, Sundue & R.C.Moran
- Parapolystichum barterianum (Hook.) Rouhan
- Parapolystichum boivinii (Baker) Rouhan
- Parapolystichum calanthum (Endl.) J.J.S.Gardner & Nagalingum
- Parapolystichum confine (C.Chr.) Labiak, Sundue & R.C.Moran
- Parapolystichum coriaceosquamatum (Rakotondr.) Rouhan
- Parapolystichum currorii (Mett. ex Kuhn) Rouhan
- Parapolystichum effusum (Sw.) Ching
- Parapolystichum excultum (Mett.) Labiak, Sundue & R.C.Moran
- Parapolystichum fideleae (Rakotondr.) Rouhan
- Parapolystichum glabellum (A.Cunn.) Labiak, Sundue & R.C.Moran
- Parapolystichum grayi (D.L.Jones) J.J.S.Gardner & Nagalingum
- Parapolystichum hornei (Baker) Rouhan
- Parapolystichum kermadecense (Perrie & Brownsey) Perrie & L.D.Sheph.
- Parapolystichum manongarivense (Rakotondr.) Rouhan
- Parapolystichum microsorum (Endl.) Labiak, Sundue & R.C.Moran
- Parapolystichum munitum (Mett.) Labiak, Sundue & R.C.Moran
- Parapolystichum nephrodioides (Baker) Perrie
- Parapolystichum nigritianum (Baker) Rouhan
- Parapolystichum novoguineense (Holttum) Sundue & Testo
- Parapolystichum pacificum (Tindale) J.J.S.Gardner & Nagalingum
- Parapolystichum perrierianum (C.Chr.) Rouhan
- Parapolystichum pseudoperrierianum (Tardieu) Rouhan
- Parapolystichum rufescens (Blume) Labiak, Sundue & R.C.Moran
- Parapolystichum smithianum (Tindale) Labiak, Sundue & R.C.Moran
- Parapolystichum subsimile (Hook.) Rouhan
- Parapolystichum tinarooense (Tindale) Labiak, Sundue & R.C.Moran
- Parapolystichum villosissimum C.Sánchez & Labiak
- Parapolystichum vogelii (Hook.) Rouhan
- Parapolystichum windsorense (D.L.Jones & B.Gray) Labiak, Sundue & R.C.Moran
