= Maxonia =

Scientific classification
- Kingdom: Plantae
- Clade: Tracheophytes
- Division: Polypodiophyta
- Class: Polypodiopsida
- Order: Polypodiales
- Suborder: Polypodiineae
- Family: Dryopteridaceae
- Genus: Maxonia; C.Chr.
- Species: M. apiifolia

Binomial name
- Maxonia apiifolia (Sw.) C.Chr.

Synonyms
- Aspidium apiifolium (Sw.) Mett.ex Kuhn; Aspidium ascendens (Heward) Hook.; Aspidium ascendens Heward; Dennstaedtia apiifolia (Sw.) Moore; Dicksonia apiifolia Sw.; Dryopteris apiifolia (Sw.) Kuntze; Lastrea ascendens (Heward) J.Sm.; Nephrodium ascendens (Heward) Donn.Sm.; Polystichum apiifolium (Sw.) C.Chr.; Polystichum ascendens (Heward) Moore

Genus of ferns

Maxonia is a genus of ferns in the fern family Dryopteridaceae, subfamily Polybotryoideae, in the Pteridophyte Phylogeny Group classification of 2016 (PPG I). The genus has a single species Maxonia apiifolia, native to Cuba and Jamaica. It formerly occurred in Florida, but is now extinct there.

The genus name of Maxonia is in honour of William Ralph Maxon (1877–1948), who was an American botanist and pteridologist.

The genus was circumscribed by Carl Christensen in Smithsonian Misc. Collect. vol.6 (Issue 9) n page 3 in 1916.
