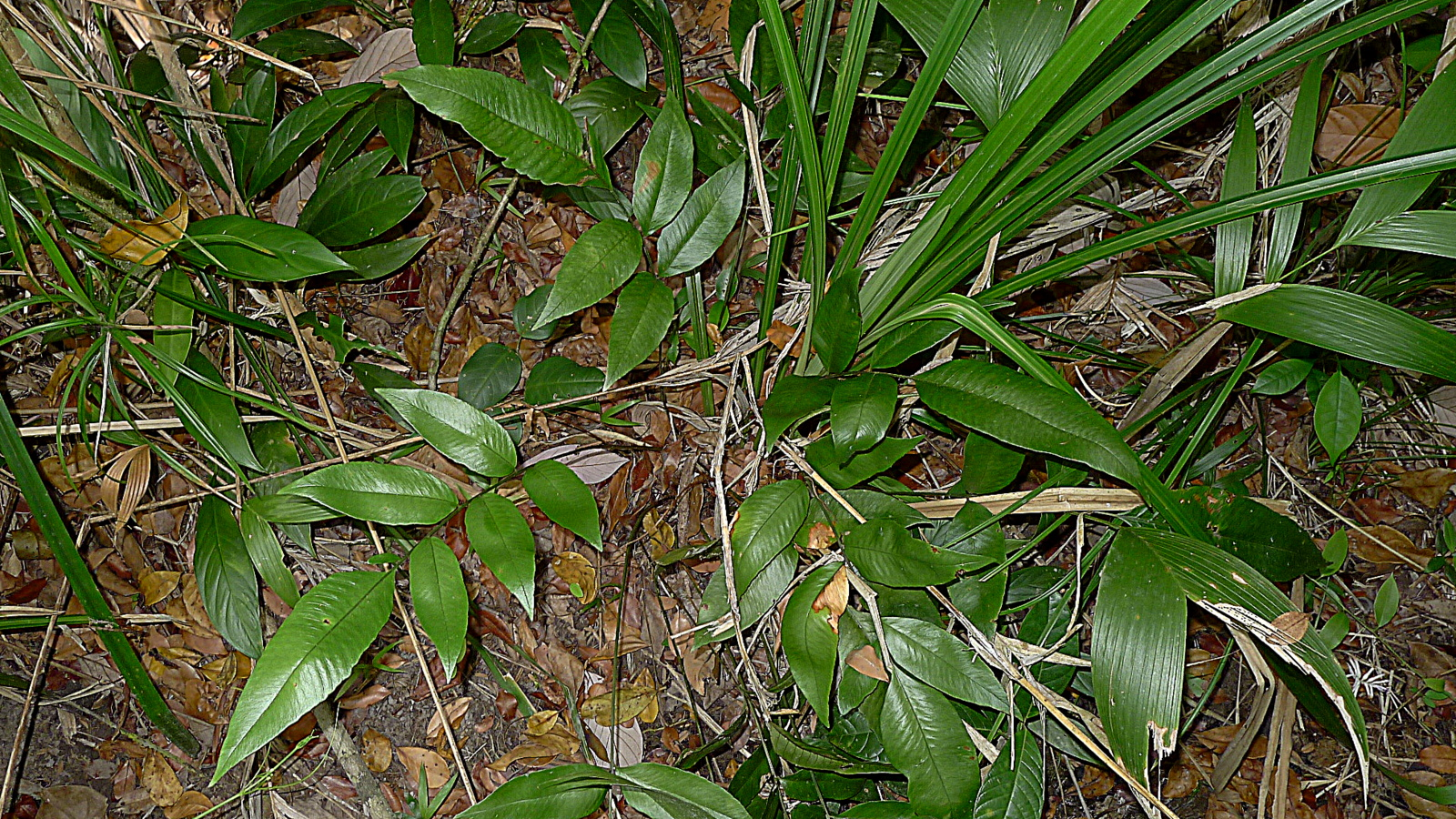
- Cyclodium meniscioides

Scientific classification
- Kingdom: Plantae
- Clade: Tracheophytes
- Division: Polypodiophyta
- Class: Polypodiopsida
- Order: Polypodiales
- Suborder: Polypodiineae
- Family: Dryopteridaceae
- Subfamily: Polybotryoideae
- Genus: Cyclodium; C.Presl

Species
- See text

= Cyclodium =

Genus of ferns

Cyclodium is a plant genus in the fern family Dryopteridaceae, subfamily Polybotryoideae, in the Pteridophyte Phylogeny Group classification of 2016 (PPG I).

== Species ==
As of November 2026, the Checklist of Ferns and Lycophytes of the World, World Flora Online and Plants of the World Online recognized 13 species in Cyclodium. (World Flora Online also includes a duplicate entry for C. varians.)

- Cyclodium akawaiorum A.R.Sm.
- Cyclodium alansmithii Bohn & Labiak
- Cyclodium calophyllum (C.V.Morton) A.R.Sm.
- Cyclodium chocoense (A.R.Sm.) Bohn & Labiak
- Cyclodium guianense (Klotzsch) van der Werff ex L.D.Gómez
- Cyclodium heterodon (Schrad.) T.Moore
- Cyclodium inerme (Fée) A.R.Sm.
- Cyclodium meniscioides (Willd.) C.Presl
- Cyclodium pubescens Bohn & Labiak
- Cyclodium rheophilum A.R.Sm.
- Cyclodium seemannii (Hook.) A.R.Sm.
- Cyclodium trianae (Mett.) A.R.Sm.
- Cyclodium varians (Fée) A.R.Sm.
