= Stigmatopteris =

Scientific classification
- Kingdom: Plantae
- Clade: Tracheophytes
- Division: Polypodiophyta
- Class: Polypodiopsida
- Order: Polypodiales
- Suborder: Polypodiineae
- Family: Dryopteridaceae
- Subfamily: Polybotryoideae
- Genus: Stigmatopteris; C.Chr.

Species
- See text.

Synonyms
- Dryopteris subg. Stigmatopteris (C.Chr.) C.Chr.

Genus of ferns

Stigmatopteris is a genus of ferns in the family Dryopteridaceae, subfamily Polybotryoideae, in the Pteridophyte Phylogeny Group classification of 2016 (PPG I).

== Species ==
As of November 2026, the Checklist of Ferns and Lycophytes of the World and Plants of the World Online accepted the following 26 species in Stigmatopteris, while World Flora Online accepted two additional species:

- Stigmatopteris alloeoptera (Kunze) C.Chr.
- Stigmatopteris bradei Rosenst. (includes S. brevinervis, recognized by World Flora Online)
- Stigmatopteris bulbifera R.C.Moran
- Stigmatopteris carrii (Baker) C.Chr.
- Stigmatopteris caudata (Raddi) C.Chr.
- Stigmatopteris contracta (Christ) C.Chr.
- Stigmatopteris gemmipara C.Chr.
- Stigmatopteris hemiptera (Maxon) C.Chr.
- Stigmatopteris heterocarpa (Fée) Rosenst.
- Stigmatopteris heterophlebia (Baker) R.C.Moran
- Stigmatopteris ichtiosma (Sodiro) C.Chr.
- Stigmatopteris jamaicensis (Desv.) Proctor
- Stigmatopteris killipiana Lellinger
- Stigmatopteris lechleri (Mett.) C.Chr.
- Stigmatopteris litoralis Rosenst.
- Stigmatopteris longicaudata (Liebm.) C.Chr.
- Stigmatopteris michaelis (Baker) C.Chr.
- Stigmatopteris nephrodioides (Klotzsch) C.Chr.
- Stigmatopteris opaca (Baker) C.Chr.
- Stigmatopteris pellucidopunctata (C.Chr.) C.Chr.
- Stigmatopteris prionites (Kunze) C.Chr.
- Stigmatopteris pterorhachis R.C.Moran
- Stigmatopteris rotundata (Humb. & Bonpl. ex Willd.) C.Chr.
- Stigmatopteris sordida (Maxon) C.Chr.
- Stigmatopteris tijuccana (Raddi) C.Chr. (also recognized separately by World Flora Online as S. tyucana)
- Stigmatopteris ulei (Christ) Sehnem
