= Polystichopsis =

Scientific classification
- Kingdom: Plantae
- Clade: Tracheophytes
- Division: Polypodiophyta
- Class: Polypodiopsida
- Order: Polypodiales
- Suborder: Polypodiineae
- Family: Dryopteridaceae
- Subfamily: Polybotryoideae
- Genus: Polystichopsis (J.Sm.) Holttum

Species
- See text.

Genus of ferns

Polystichopsis is a genus of ferns in the family Dryopteridaceae, subfamily Polybotryoideae, in the Pteridophyte Phylogeny Group classification of 2016 (PPG I).

== Species ==
As of November 2026, seven species and one hybrid are accepted in Polystichopsis by the Checklist of Ferns and Lycophytes of the World, World Flora Online, and Plants of the World Online:

- Polystichopsis chaerophylloides (Poir.) C.V.Morton
- Polystichopsis leucochaete (Sloss.) J.Prado & R.C.Moran
- Polystichopsis lurida (Jenman ex Underw. & Maxon) C.V.Morton
- Polystichopsis muscosa (M.Vahl) Proctor
- Polystichopsis puberula J.Prado & R.C.Moran
- Polystichopsis pubescens (L.) C.V.Morton
- Polystichopsis sericea (Mett. ex Eaton) C.Sánchez
- Polystichopsis × sanchezii J.Prado & R.C.Moran

In addition, Plants of the World Online recognizes three species placed elsewhere by other checklists:

- Polystichopsis argillicola Proctor is a synonym of a species being recombined in the new genus Pradopteris.
- Polystichopsis formosa (Fée) comb. ined., accepted as Arachniodes formosa in other checklists.
- Polystichopsis villosa Christenh., considered a synonym of P. muscosa in other checklists.
