= Trichoneuron =

Scientific classification
- Kingdom: Plantae
- Clade: Tracheophytes
- Division: Polypodiophyta
- Class: Polypodiopsida
- Order: Polypodiales
- Suborder: Polypodiineae
- Family: Dryopteridaceae
- Genus: Trichoneuron; Ching
- Species: T. microlepioides

Binomial name
- Trichoneuron microlepioides Ching

Synonyms
- Lastreopsis microlepioides (Ching) W.M.Chu & Z.R.He

Genus of ferns

Trichoneuron is a genus of ferns in the family Dryopteridaceae, subfamily Polybotryoideae, in the Pteridophyte Phylogeny Group classification of 2016 (PPG I). The genus has a single species Trichoneuron microlepioides, native to Yunnan, China.
