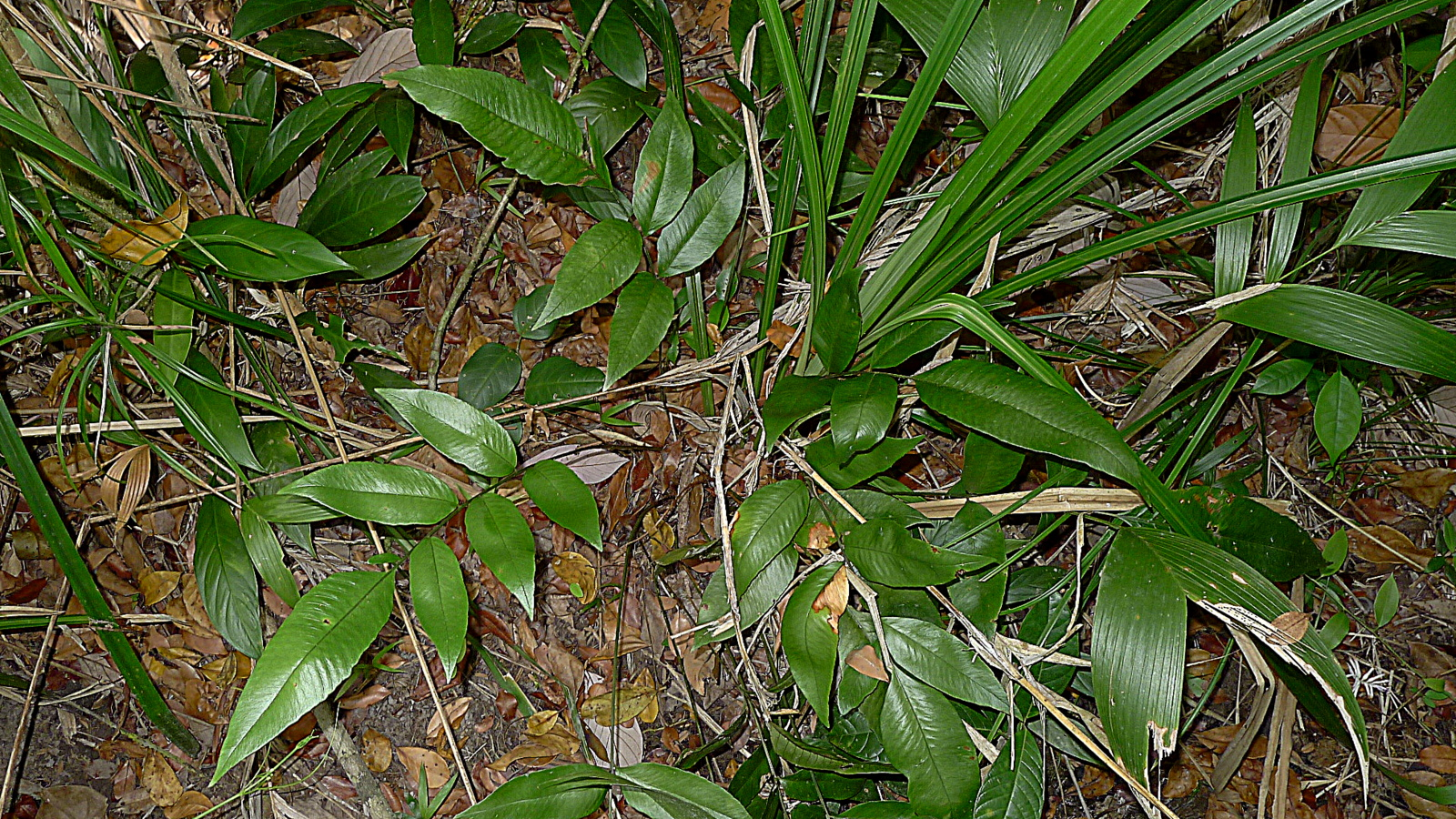

Scientific classification
- Kingdom: Plantae
- Clade: Tracheophytes
- Division: Polypodiophyta
- Class: Polypodiopsida
- Order: Polypodiales
- Suborder: Polypodiineae
- Family: Dryopteridaceae
- Genus: Cyclodium
- Species: C. meniscioides

Binomial name
- Cyclodium meniscioides (Willd.) C. Presl

Synonyms
- Aspidium meniscioides Willd.; Dryopteris meniscioides (Willd.) Kuntze; Nephrodium meniscioides (Willd.) J.Sm.; Stigmatopteris meniscioides (Willd.) K.U.Kramer

= Cyclodium meniscioides =

Species of fern

Cyclodium meniscioides is a fern in the family Dryopteridaceae.

The fern is native to northern and western South America, including in Bolivia, Brazil, Ecuador, Paraguay, central Peru; and on the Guiana Shield in French Guiana, Guyana, Suriname, and Venezuela.

== Varieties ==
Varieties include:

- Cyclodium meniscioides var. meniscioides
- Cyclodium meniscioides var. paludosum (C.V. Morton) A.R. Sm.
- Cyclodium meniscioides var. rigidissimum (C. Chr.) A.R. Sm.
