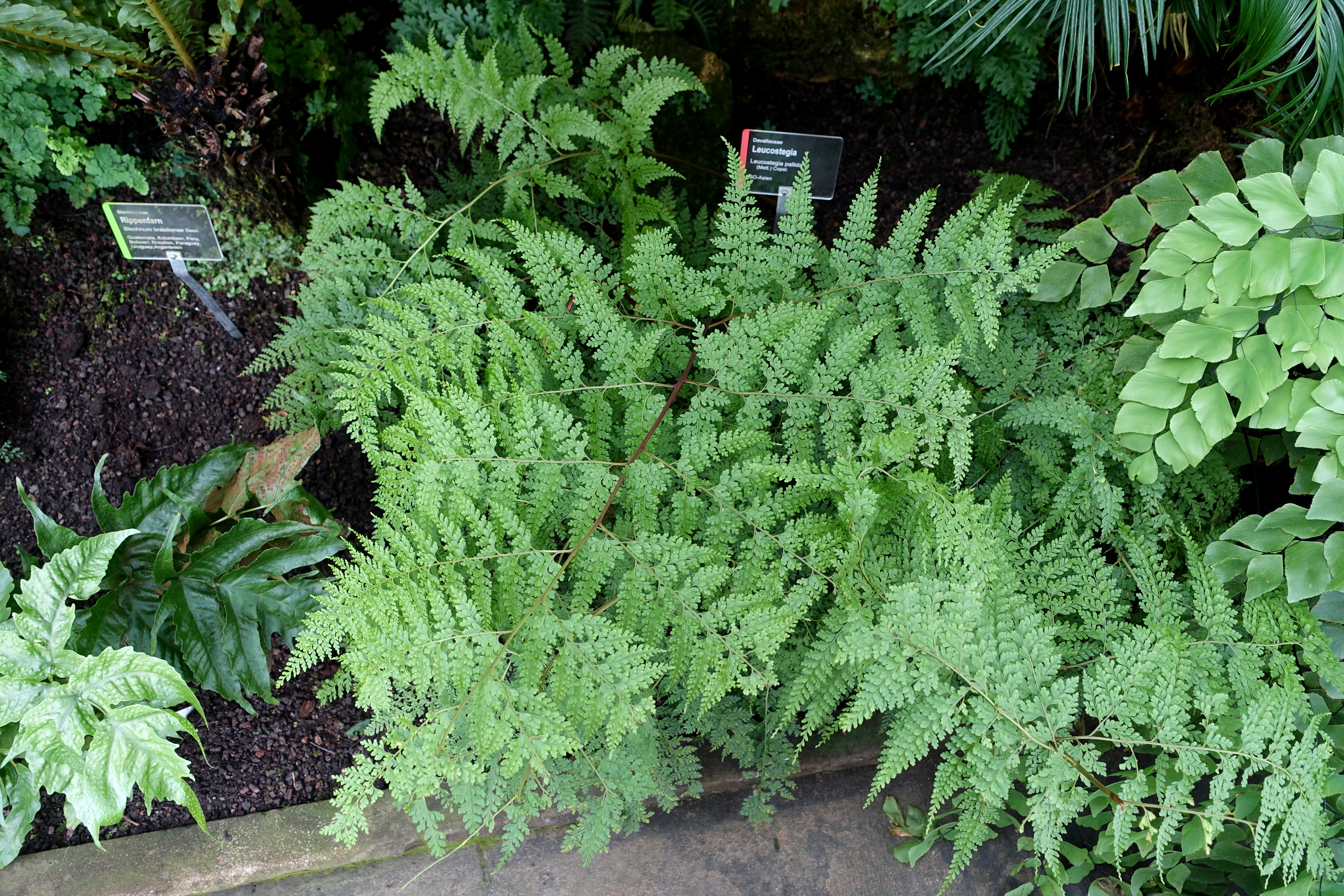
- Leucostegia pallida

Scientific classification
- Kingdom: Plantae
- Clade: Tracheophytes
- Division: Polypodiophyta
- Class: Polypodiopsida
- Order: Polypodiales
- Suborder: Polypodiineae
- Family: Hypodematiaceae; Ching

Genera
- Hypodematium; Leucostegia

Synonyms
- Hypodematioideae Christenhusz 2014

= Hypodematiaceae =

Family of ferns

Hypodematiaceae is a family of ferns in the order Polypodiales. In the Pteridophyte Phylogeny Group classification of 2016 (PPG I), the family is placed in the suborder Polypodiineae. Alternatively, it may be treated as the subfamily Hypodematioideae of a very broadly defined family Polypodiaceae sensu lato. The family consists of two, or in some versions three, small genera.

== Taxonomy ==
Hypodematiaceae was erected by Ren-Chang Ching in 1975, but was not subsequently accepted by many authors. It was not accepted in a classification of ferns that was published in 2006. In that paper, the genera Hypodematium, Leucostegia, and Didymochlaena were provisionally assigned to Dryopteridaceae, with the authors expressing some doubt about whether they really belonged there. In two molecular phylogenetic studies published in 2007, the clade that was tentatively called eupolypods I was resolved as a tritomy consisting of Didymochlaena, Hypodematiaceae sensu stricto, and the rest of eupolypods I.

=== Phylogeny ===
The following cladogram for the suborder Polypodiineae (eupolypods I), based on the consensus cladogram in the Pteridophyte Phylogeny Group classification of 2016 (PPG I), shows a likely phylogenetic relationship between Hypodematiaceae and the other families of the clade.

- Polypodiineae (eupolypods I)
  - Didymochlaenaceae
  - - Hypodematiaceae
    - - Dryopteridaceae
      - - - Nephrolepidaceae
          - Lomariopsidaceae
        - - Tectariaceae
          - - Oleandraceae
            - - Davalliaceae
              - Polypodiaceae

=== Genera ===
The Pteridophyte Phylogeny Group classification (PPG I) includes two genera:

- Hypodematium Kunze – about 20 species
- Leucostegia C.Presl – two species

Didymochlaena has been placed in this family as well, but in PPG I, it is placed in its own family, Didymochlaenaceae.
