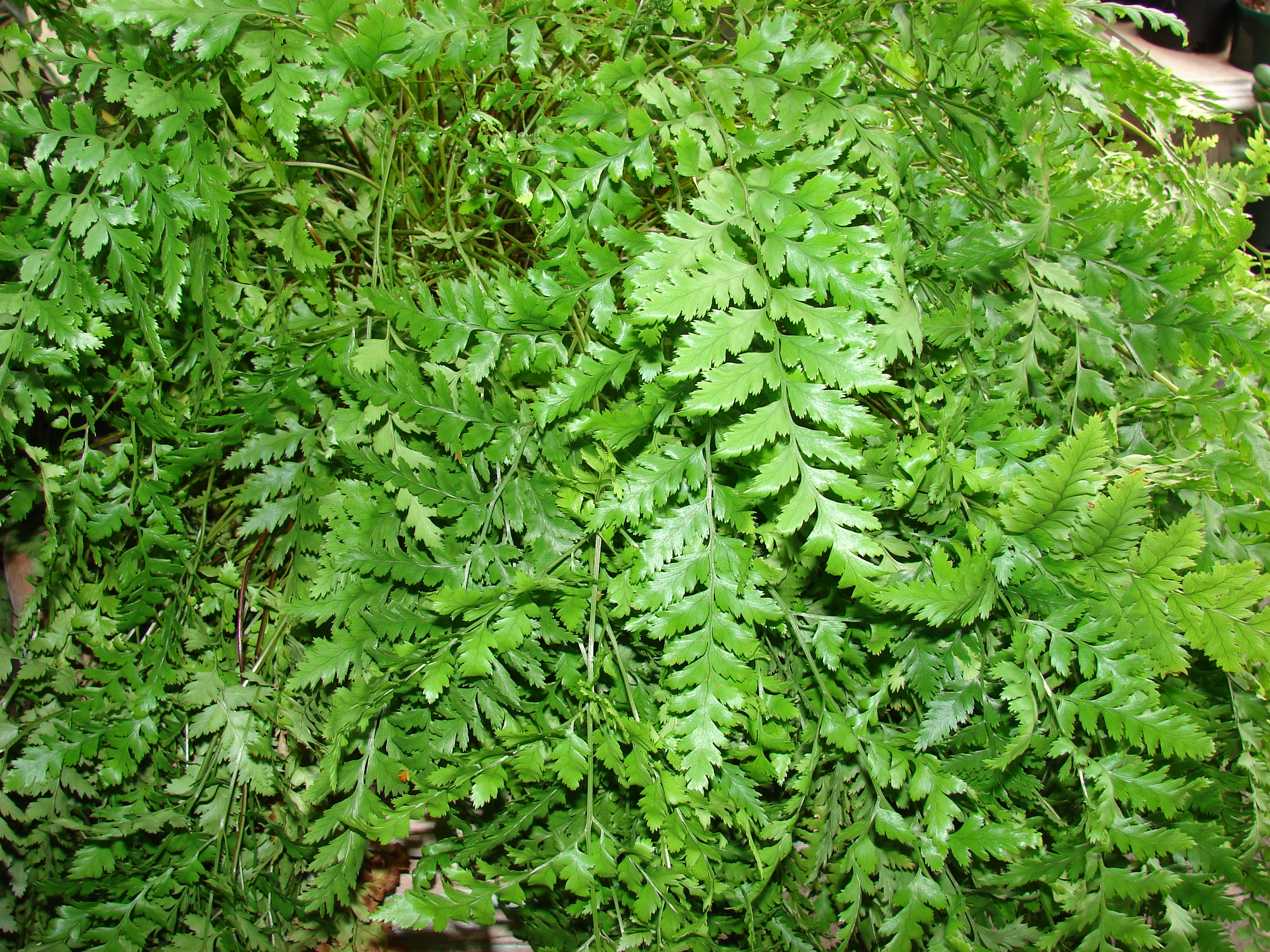
- Rumohra adiantiformis

Scientific classification
- Kingdom: Plantae
- Clade: Tracheophytes
- Division: Polypodiophyta
- Class: Polypodiopsida
- Order: Polypodiales
- Suborder: Polypodiineae
- Family: Dryopteridaceae
- Subfamily: Elaphoglossoideae
- Genus: Rumohra; Raddi

Species
- See text.

= Rumohra =

Genus of ferns

Rumohra is a genus of ferns in the family Dryopteridaceae, subfamily Elaphoglossoideae, in the Pteridophyte Phylogeny Group classification of 2016 (PPG I).

The fronds of species within this genus contain round sori (reproductive clusters) on the underside of the pinnae (leaflets) unlike many other ferns which have separate specialized reproductive fronds. Many of the sori have peltate indusia and have prominent scales on the stipes of the fronds. Species have a wide distribution; for example, Rumohra adiantiformis is found in the Old World as well as the New World, including such diverse places as the Galapagos Islands and New Zealand.

== Species ==
As of November 2026, the Checklist of Ferns and Lycophytes of the World, World Flora Online,, and Plants of the World Online all accepted the following 11 species in Rumohra:

- Rumohra aconquijana Arana, Bulacio & Slanis
- Rumohra adiantiformis (G.Forst.) Ching
- Rumohra berteroana (Colla) R.R.Rodriguez
- Rumohra glandulosa Tardieu
- Rumohra glandulosissima Sundue & J.Prado
- Rumohra humbertii Tardieu
- Rumohra linearisquamata Rakotondr.
- Rumohra lokohensis Tardieu
- Rumohra madagascarica (Bonap.) Tardieu
- Rumohra ponceana Arana, M.L.Luna & Giudice
- Rumohra quadrangularis (Fée) Brade
