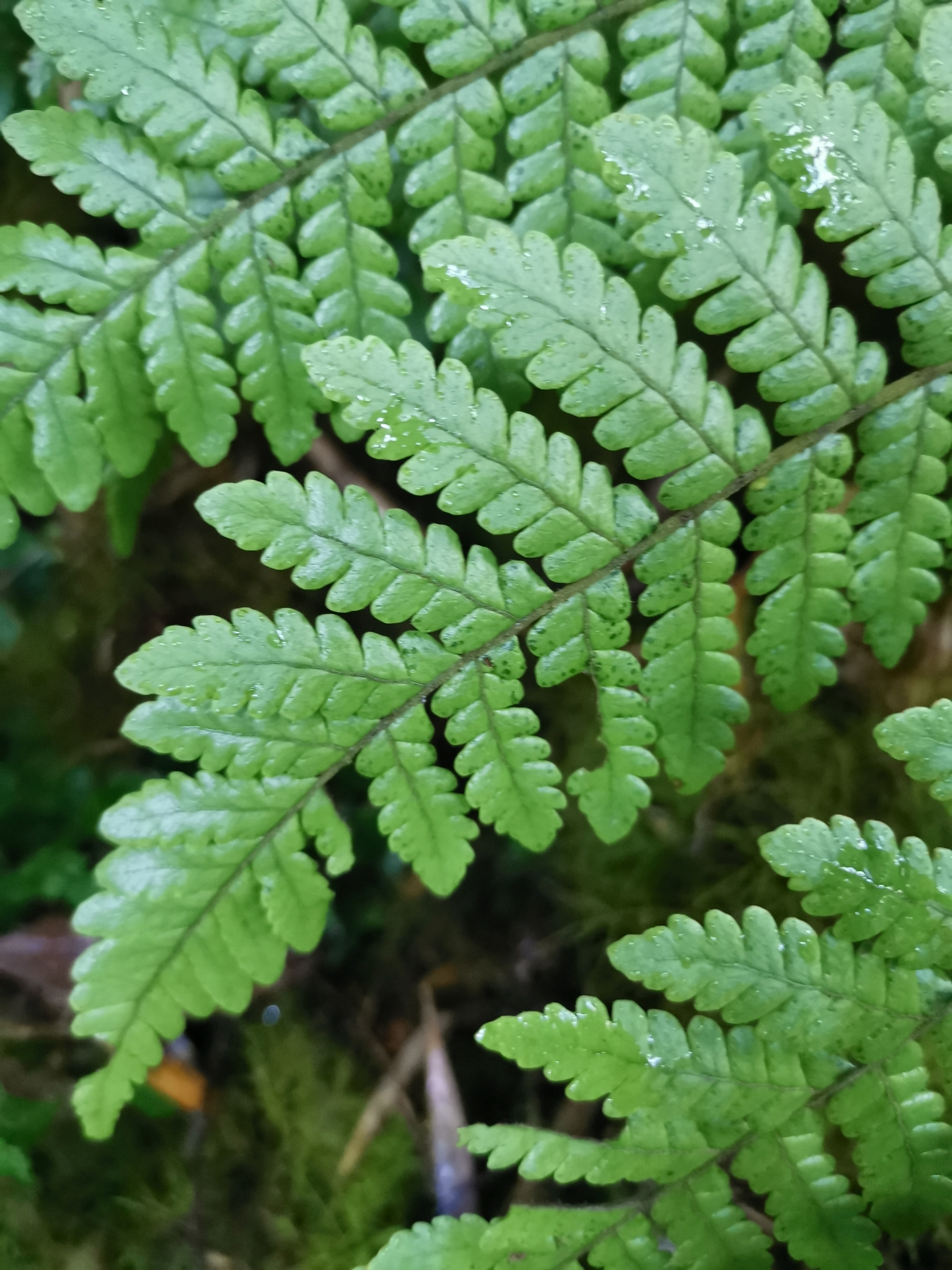
- Megalastrum spectabile

Scientific classification
- Kingdom: Plantae
- Clade: Tracheophytes
- Division: Polypodiophyta
- Class: Polypodiopsida
- Order: Polypodiales
- Suborder: Polypodiineae
- Family: Dryopteridaceae
- Subfamily: Elaphoglossoideae
- Genus: Megalastrum; Holttum

Species
- See text.

Synonyms
- Ctenitis sect. Subincisae (C.Chr.) Tindale; Dryopteris sect. Subincisae C.Chr.

= Megalastrum =

Genus of ferns

Megalastrum is a genus of ferns in the family Dryopteridaceae, subfamily Elaphoglossoideae, in the Pteridophyte Phylogeny Group classification of 2016 (PPG I). The genus has around 100 species, mainly found in tropical America and Africa.

== Taxonomy ==
The genus name Megalastrum was first published by Richard Holttum in 1987.

=== Species ===
As of November 2026, the Checklist of Ferns and Lycophytes of the World, World Flora Online, and Plants of the World Online all recognized the following 96 species in Megalastrum:

- Megalastrum abundans (Rosenst.) A.R.Sm. & R.C.Moran
- Megalastrum acrosorum (Hieron.) A.R.Sm. & R.C.Moran
- Megalastrum adenopteris (C.Chr.) A.R.Sm. & R.C.Moran
- Megalastrum albidum R.C.Moran, J.Prado & Labiak
- Megalastrum alticola M.Kessler & A.R.Sm.
- Megalastrum andicola (C.Chr.) A.R.Sm. & R.C.Moran
- Megalastrum angustum R.C.Moran, J.Prado & Labiak
- Megalastrum apicale R.C.Moran & J.Prado
- Megalastrum aquilinum (Thouars) Sundue, Rouhan & R.C.Moran
- Megalastrum aripense (C.Chr. & Maxon) A.R.Sm. & R.C.Moran
- Megalastrum atrogriseum (C.Chr.) A.R.Sm. & R.C.Moran
- Megalastrum aureisquama M.Kessler & A.R.Sm.
- Megalastrum biseriale (Baker) A.R.Sm. & R.C.Moran
- Megalastrum bolivianum M.Kessler & A.R.Sm.
- Megalastrum brevipubens R.C.Moran, J.Prado & Labiak
- Megalastrum canescens (Mett.) A.R.Sm. & R.C.Moran
- Megalastrum caribaeum (Desv.) R.C.Moran, J.Prado & Labiak
- Megalastrum ciliatum M.Kessler & A.R.Sm.
- Megalastrum clathratum R.C.Moran, J.Prado & Sundue
- Megalastrum connexum (Kaulf.) A.R.Sm. & R.C.Moran
- Megalastrum costipubens R.C.Moran & J.Prado
- Megalastrum crenulans (Fée) A.R.Sm. & R.C.Moran
- Megalastrum ctenitoides A.Rojas
- Megalastrum decompositum R.C.Moran, J.Prado & Sundue
- Megalastrum dentatum A.Rojas
- Megalastrum eugenii (Brade) A.R.Sm. & R.C.Moran
- Megalastrum falcatum A.Rojas
- Megalastrum fibrillosum (Baker) R.C.Moran, J.Prado & Sundue
- Megalastrum fimbriatum R.C.Moran, J.Prado & Sundue
- Megalastrum fugaceum R.C.Moran, J.Prado & Sundue
- Megalastrum galapagense R.C.Moran, J.Prado & Sundue
- Megalastrum galeottii (M.Martens) R.C.Moran & J.Prado
- Megalastrum gilbertii (Clute) R.C.Moran, J.Prado & Labiak
- Megalastrum glabrius (C.Chr. & Skottsb.) Sundue, Rouhan & R.C.Moran
- Megalastrum glabrum R.C.Moran & J.Prado
- Megalastrum gompholepis R.C.Moran & J.Prado
- Megalastrum grande (C.Presl) A.R.Sm. & R.C.Moran
- Megalastrum haitiense (Brause) A.R.Sm. & R.C.Moran
- Megalastrum heydei (C.Chr.) R.C.Moran & J.Prado
- Megalastrum hirsutosetosum (Hieron.) A.R.Sm. & R.C.Moran
- Megalastrum honestum (Kunze) A.R.Sm. & R.C.Moran
- Megalastrum inaequale (Link) A.R.Sm. & R.C.Moran
- Megalastrum inaequalifolium (Colla) A.R.Sm. & R.C.Moran
- Megalastrum indusiatum R.C.Moran, J.Prado & Labiak
- Megalastrum insigne R.C.Moran, J.Prado & Sundue
- Megalastrum intermedium R.C.Moran & J.Prado
- Megalastrum lanatum (Fée) Holttum
- Megalastrum lanuginosum (Kaulf.) Holttum
- Megalastrum littorale R.C.Moran, J.Prado & Labiak
- Megalastrum longiglandulosum R.C.Moran & J.Prado
- Megalastrum longipilosum A.Rojas
- Megalastrum lunense (Christ) A.R.Sm. & R.C.Moran
- Megalastrum macrotheca (Fée) A.R.Sm. & R.C.Moran
- Megalastrum marginatum M.Kessler & A.R.Sm.
- Megalastrum martinicense (Spreng.) R.C.Moran, J.Prado & Labiak
- Megalastrum masafuerae Sundue, Rouhan & R.C.Moran
- Megalastrum mexicanum R.C.Moran & J.Prado
- Megalastrum microsorum (Kuntze) Stolze
- Megalastrum miscellum R.C.Moran, J.Prado & Sundue
- Megalastrum molle A.R.Sm.
- Megalastrum mollicomum (C.Chr.) A.R.Sm. & R.C.Moran
- Megalastrum nanum R.C.Moran, J.Prado & Sundue
- Megalastrum nigromarginatum R.C.Moran, J.Prado & Sundue
- Megalastrum obtusum R.C.Moran, J.Prado & Sundue
- Megalastrum oellgaardii R.C.Moran, J.Prado & Sundue
- Megalastrum oppositum (Kaulf. ex Spreng.) Li Bing Zhang & Yi F.Duan
- Megalastrum oreocharis (Sehnem) Salino & Ponce
- Megalastrum oreophilum R.C.Moran, J.Prado & Sundue
- Megalastrum organense R.C.Moran, J.Prado & Labiak
- Megalastrum palmense (Rosenst.) A.R.Sm. & R.C.Moran
- Megalastrum peregrinum Sundue, Rouhan & R.C.Moran
- Megalastrum peruvianum R.C.Moran, J.Prado & Sundue
- Megalastrum platylobum (Baker) A.R.Sm. & R.C.Moran
- Megalastrum pleiosoros (Hook.f.) A.R.Sm. & R.C.Moran
- Megalastrum polybotryoides R.C.Moran, J.Prado & Sundue
- Megalastrum praetermissum R.C.Moran, J.Prado & Sundue
- Megalastrum pubescens A.Rojas
- Megalastrum pubirhachis R.C.Moran, J.Prado & Sundue
- Megalastrum pulverulentum (Poir.) A.R.Sm. & R.C.Moran
- Megalastrum reductum A.Rojas
- Megalastrum retrorsum R.C.Moran, J.Prado & Labiak
- Megalastrum rhachisquamatum R.C.Moran, J.Prado & Sundue
- Megalastrum rupicola M.Kessler & A.R.Sm.
- Megalastrum skutchii (Lellinger) A.R.Sm. & R.C.Moran
- Megalastrum sparsipilosum R.C.Moran & J.Prado
- Megalastrum spectabile (Kaulf.) A.R.Sm. & R.C.Moran
- Megalastrum squamosissimum (Sodiro) A.R.Sm. & R.C.Moran
- Megalastrum squamosum A.Rojas
- Megalastrum subincisum (Willd.) A.R.Sm. & R.C.Moran
- Megalastrum substrigosum R.C.Moran, J.Prado & Labiak
- Megalastrum subtile R.C.Moran, J.Prado & Sundue
- Megalastrum taafense Rouhan, Sundue & R.C.Moran
- Megalastrum tepuiense R.C.Moran, J.Prado & Sundue
- Megalastrum umbrinum (C.Chr.) A.R.Sm. & R.C.Moran
- Megalastrum vastum (Kunze) A.R.Sm. & R.C.Moran
- Megalastrum villosum (L.) Holttum
- Megalastrum wacketii (C.Chr.) A.R.Sm. & R.C.Moran

In addition, World Flora Online and Plants of the World Online recognize M. haitiense, synonymized with M. macrotheca by the Checklist of Ferns and Lycophytes of the World.
