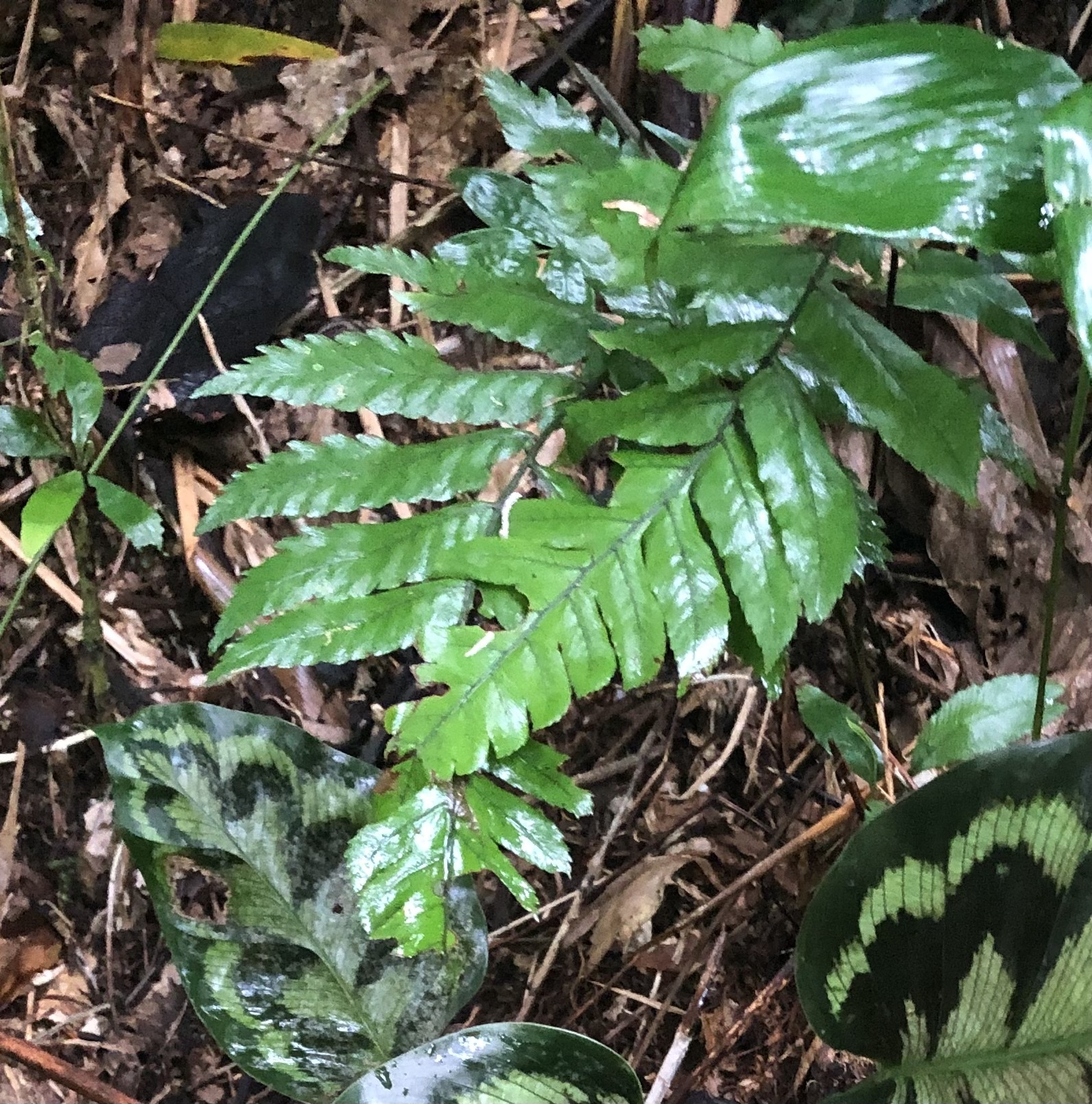
- Polybotrya caudata in Peru

Scientific classification
- Kingdom: Plantae
- Clade: Tracheophytes
- Division: Polypodiophyta
- Class: Polypodiopsida
- Order: Polypodiales
- Suborder: Polypodiineae
- Family: Dryopteridaceae
- Subfamily: Polybotryoideae
- Genus: Polybotrya; Willd.

Species
- See text.

Synonyms
- Soromanes Fée; Amphisoria Trevis.; Botryothallus Klotzsch; Eotoneura Fée; Granulina Bory ex Fée

= Polybotrya =

Genus of ferns

Polybotrya is a genus of ferns in the family Dryopteridaceae, subfamily Polybotryoideae, in the Pteridophyte Phylogeny Group classification of 2016 (PPG I).

== Species ==
As of November 2026, the Checklist of Ferns and Lycophytes of the World, World Flora Online and Plants of the World Online accepted the following 39 species in Polybotrya:

- Polybotrya aequatoriana R.C.Moran
- Polybotrya alata R.C.Moran
- Polybotrya alfredii Brade
- Polybotrya altescandens C.Chr.
- Polybotrya andina C.Chr.
- Polybotrya appressa R.C.Moran
- Polybotrya attenuata R.C.Moran
- Polybotrya aureisquama A.Rojas
- Polybotrya bipinnata A.Rojas
- Polybotrya botryoides (Baker) C.Chr.
- Polybotrya canaliculata Klotzsch
- Polybotrya caudata Kunze
- Polybotrya crassirhizoma Lellinger
- Polybotrya cylindrica Kaulf.
- Polybotrya espiritosantensis Brade
- Polybotrya fractiserialis (Baker) J.Sm.
- Polybotrya glandulosa Mett. ex Kuhn
- Polybotrya gomezii R.C.Moran
- Polybotrya goyazensis Brade
- Polybotrya gracilis Brade
- Polybotrya hickeyi R.C.Moran
- Polybotrya insularis A.Rojas
- Polybotrya latisquamosa R.C.Moran
- Polybotrya lechleriana Mett.
- Polybotrya lourteigiana Lellinger
- Polybotrya matosii Canestraro & Labiak
- Polybotrya osmundacea Humb. & Bonpl. ex Willd.
- Polybotrya pilosa Brade
- Polybotrya pittieri Lellinger
- Polybotrya polybotryoides (Baker) Christ
- Polybotrya pubens Mart. ex Kunze
- Polybotrya puberulenta R.C.Moran
- Polybotrya semipinnata Fée
- Polybotrya serratifolia (Fée) Klotzsch
- Polybotrya sessilisora R.C.Moran
- Polybotrya sorbifolia Mett. ex Kuhn
- Polybotrya speciosa Schott
- Polybotrya stolzei R.C.Moran
- Polybotrya suberecta (Baker) C.Chr.
