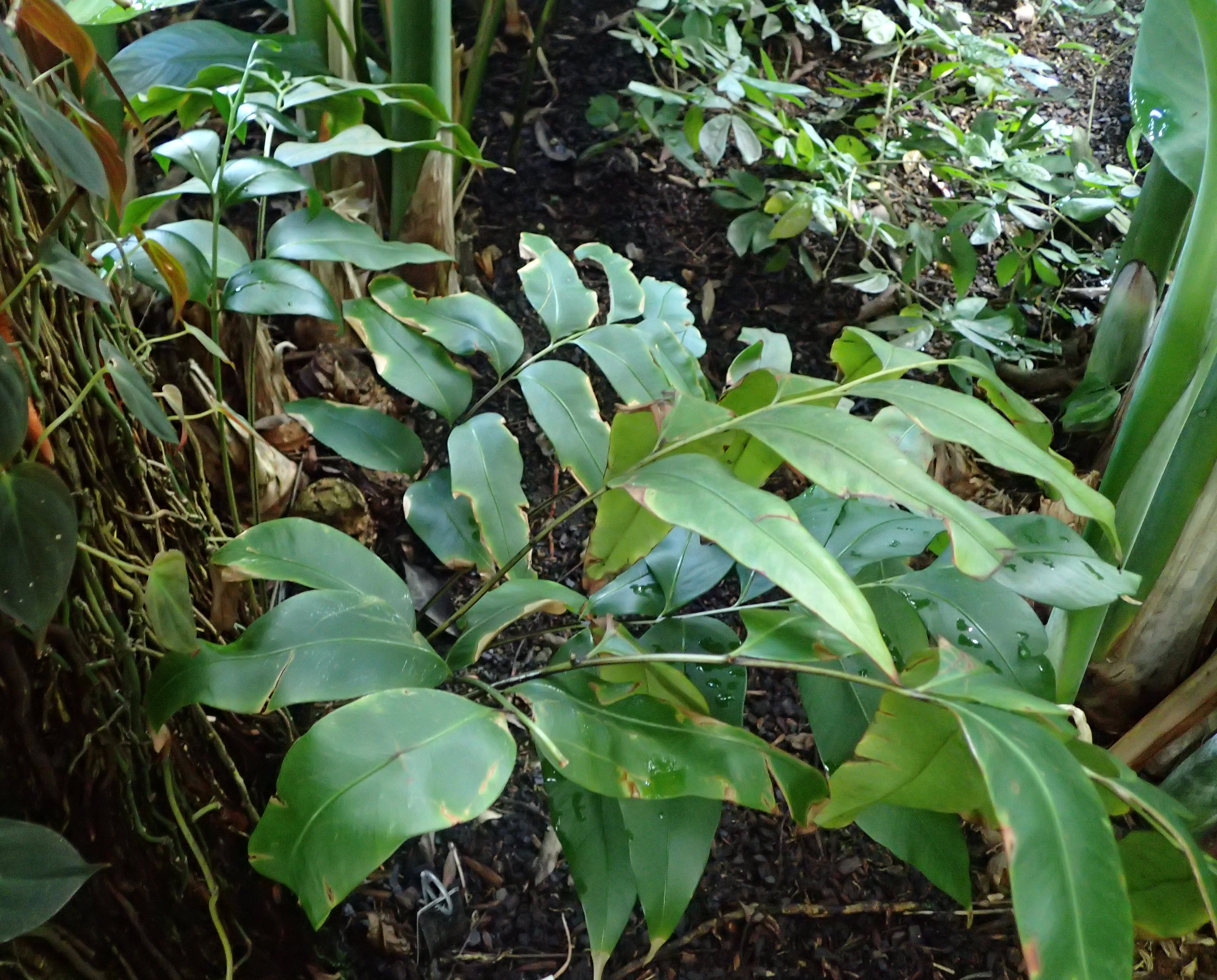
- Olfersia cervina

Scientific classification
- Kingdom: Plantae
- Clade: Tracheophytes
- Division: Polypodiophyta
- Class: Polypodiopsida
- Order: Polypodiales
- Suborder: Polypodiineae
- Family: Dryopteridaceae
- Subfamily: Polybotryoideae
- Genus: Olfersia; Raddi

Species
- See text.

Synonyms
- Dorcapteris C.Presl

= Olfersia (plant) =

Genus of ferns

Olfersia is a genus of ferns in the family Dryopteridaceae, subfamily Polybotryoideae, in the Pteridophyte Phylogeny Group classification of 2016 (PPG I). They are found in Mexico and parts of South America.

The genus name of Olfersia is in honour of Ignaz Franz Werner Maria von Olfers (1793–1871), who was a German naturalist, historian and diplomat.

The genus was circumscribed by Giuseppe Raddi in Opusc. Sci. vol.3 on page 283 in 1819.

== Species ==
As of November 2026, two published species are accepted by the Checklist of Ferns and Lycophytes of the World, World Flora Online,, and Plants of the World Online.

- Olfersia alata C.Sánchez & Caluff
- Olfersia cervina (L.) Kunze

Two other species that do not have published combinations in Olfersia are accepted by the Checklist of Ferns and Lycophytes of the World and World Flora Online. These species are being recombined in the new genus Pradopteris, rather than Olfersia.

- Olfersia macrostegia (Hook.) comb. ined.
- Olfersia ochropteroides (Baker) comb. ined.

== Native ==
They are found in Belize, Bolivia, Brazil, Colombia, Costa Rica, Cuba, Dominican Republic, Ecuador, French Guiana, Guatemala, Guyana, Haiti, Honduras, Jamaica, Leeward Islands, Mexico, Nicaragua, Panamá, Peru, Puerto Rico, Suriname, Venezuela, Venezuelan Antilles and the Windward Islands.
