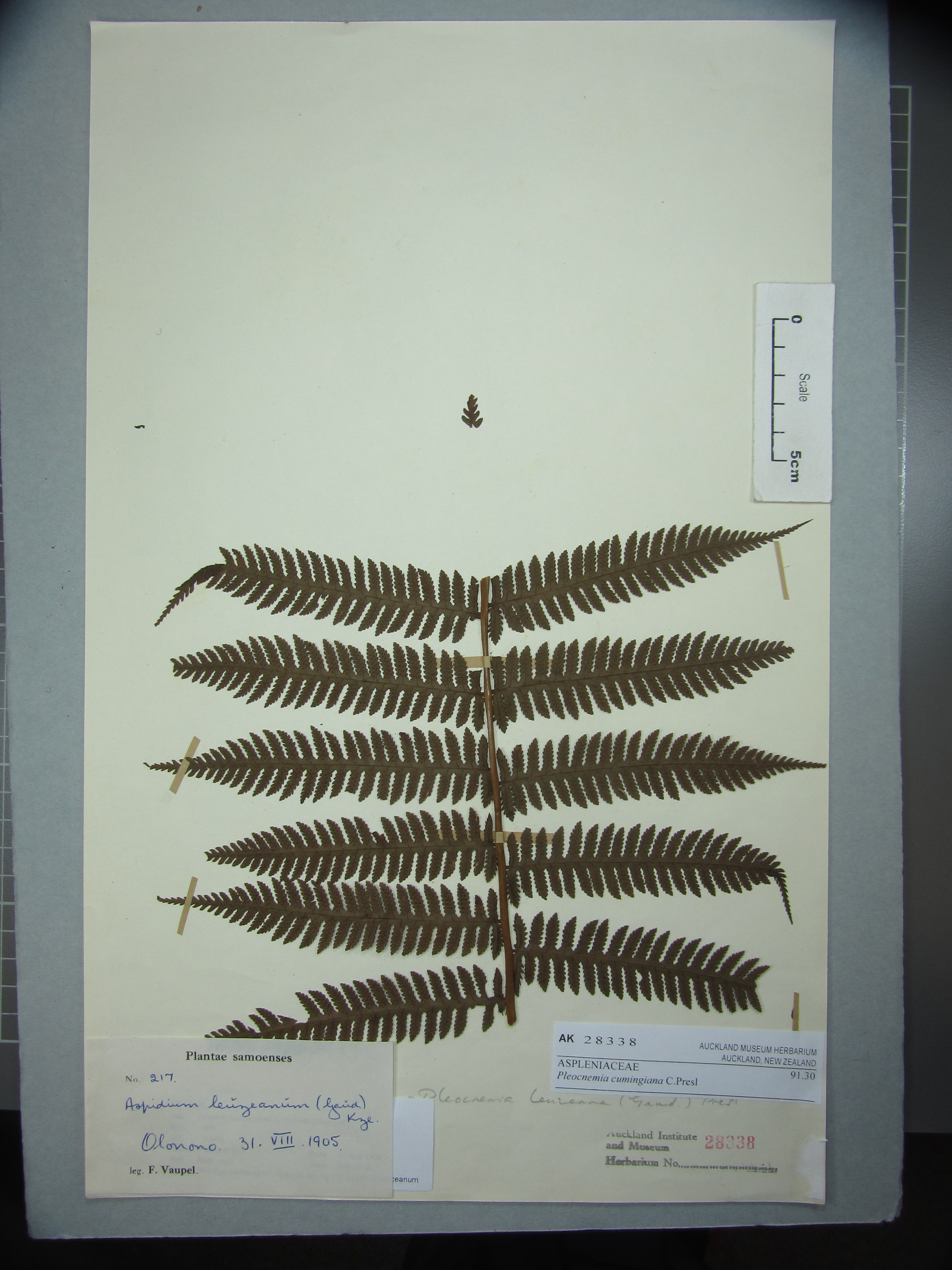
- Pleocnemia cumingiana

Scientific classification
- Kingdom: Plantae
- Clade: Tracheophytes
- Division: Polypodiophyta
- Class: Polypodiopsida
- Order: Polypodiales
- Suborder: Polypodiineae
- Family: Dryopteridaceae
- Subfamily: Elaphoglossoideae
- Genus: Pleocnemia; C.Presl

Species
- See text

Synonyms
- Arcypteris Underw.; Dictyopteris C.Presl

= Pleocnemia =

Genus of ferns

Pleocnemia is a genus of ferns in the family Dryopteridaceae, subfamily Elaphoglossoideae, in the Pteridophyte Phylogeny Group classification of 2016 (PPG I).

== Taxonomy ==
Pleocnemia was first described by Carl Borivoj Presl in 1836.

=== Species ===
As of October 2026, the Checklist of Ferns and Lycophytes of the World and Plants of the World Online recognized the following twenty species and one hybrid:

- Pleocnemia acuminata Holttum
- Pleocnemia andaiensis (Baker) Holttum
- Pleocnemia brongniartii (Bory) Holttum
- Pleocnemia conjugata (Blume) C.Presl
- Pleocnemia cumingiana C.Presl
- Pleocnemia dahlii (Hieron.) Holttum
- Pleocnemia elegans (Copel.) Holttum
- Pleocnemia hemiteliiformis (Racib.) Holttum
- Pleocnemia × intermedia Holttum
- Pleocnemia irregularis (C.Presl) Holttum
- Pleocnemia leuzeana (Gaudich.) C.Presl
- Pleocnemia macrodonta (C.Presl ex Fée) Holttum
- Pleocnemia megaphylla Holttum
- Pleocnemia milnei E.Fourn.
- Pleocnemia nesiotica (Holttum) H.G.Zhao & S.Y.Dong
- Pleocnemia olivacea (Copel.) Holttum
- Pleocnemia pleiotricha Holttum
- Pleocnemia presliana Holttum
- Pleocnemia seranensis Holttum
- Pleocnemia siamensis X.G.Xu & Li Bing Zhang
- Pleocnemia submembranacea (Hayata) Tagawa & K.Iwats.
