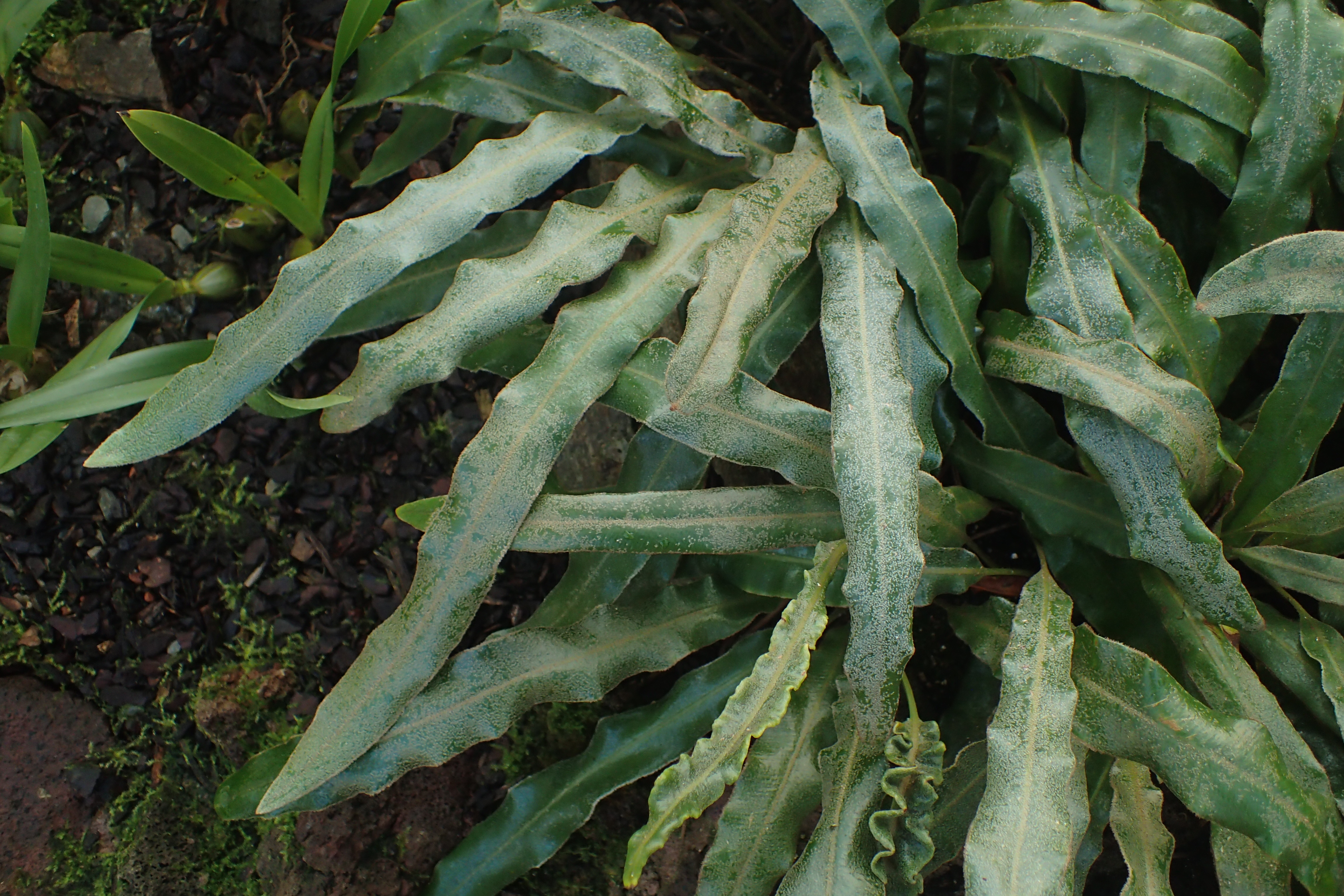
- Elaphoglossum rupestre

Scientific classification
- Kingdom: Plantae
- Clade: Tracheophytes
- Division: Polypodiophyta
- Class: Polypodiopsida
- Order: Polypodiales
- Suborder: Polypodiineae
- Family: Dryopteridaceae
- Subfamily: Elaphoglossoideae (Pic.Serm.) Crabbe, Jermy & Mickel

Genera
- Arthrobotrya; Bolbitis; Elaphoglossum; Lastreopsis; Lomagramma; Megalastrum; Mickelia; Parapolystichum; Pleocnemia; Rumohra; Teratophyllum

Synonyms
- Elaphoglossaceae Pic.Serm.

= Elaphoglossoideae =

Subfamily of ferns

Elaphoglossoideae is a subfamily of the fern family Dryopteridaceae. It has previously been regarded as the family Elaphoglossaceae. As circumscribed by the Pteridophyte Phylogeny Group in their 2016 classification (PPG I), the subfamily excludes the Polybotryoideae, which are kept separate. It can be divided into three clades: the bolbitioid ferns (Arthrobotrya, Bolbitis, Elaphoglossum, Lomagramma, Mickelia, Teratophyllum), genus Pleocnemia, sister clade to the bolbitioids, and the lastreopsid ferns (Lastreopsis, Megalastrum, Parapolystichum, Rumohra), sister to the combination of the first two clades.
