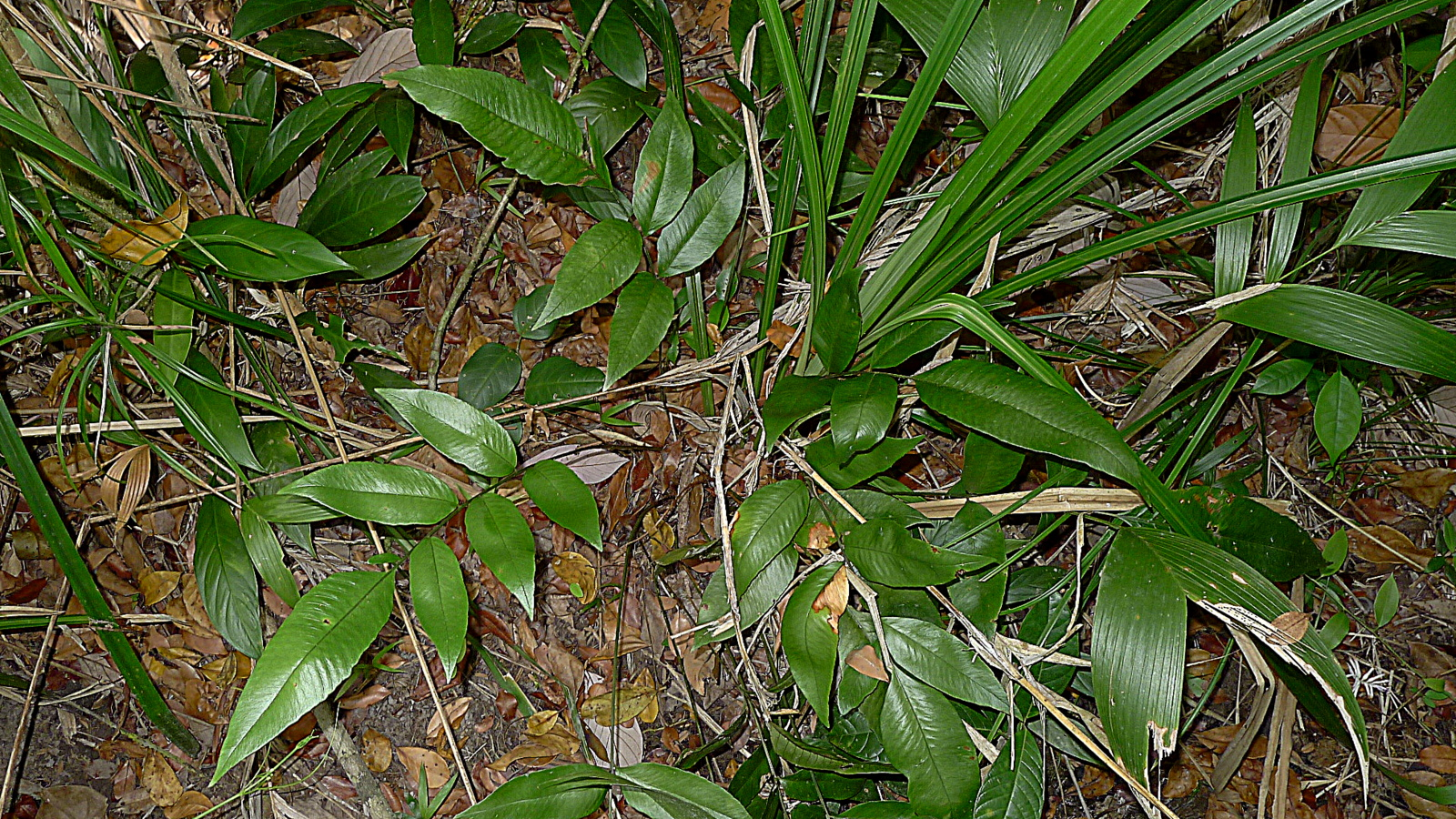
- Cyclodium meniscioides

Scientific classification
- Kingdom: Plantae
- Clade: Tracheophytes
- Division: Polypodiophyta
- Class: Polypodiopsida
- Order: Polypodiales
- Suborder: Polypodiineae
- Family: Dryopteridaceae
- Subfamily: Polybotryoideae; H.M.Liu & X.C.Zhang

Genera
- See text.

= Polybotryoideae =

Subfamily of ferns

Polybotryoideae is a subfamily of the fern family Dryopteridaceae.

== Genera ==
The Pteridophyte Phylogeny Group classification of 2016 (PPG I) accepts the following genera:

- Cyclodium C.Presl
- Maxonia C.Chr
- Olfersia Raddi
- Polybotrya Humb. & Bonpl. ex Willd.
- Polystichopsis (J.Sm.) C.Chr.
- Stigmatopteris C.Chr.
- Trichoneuron Ching
