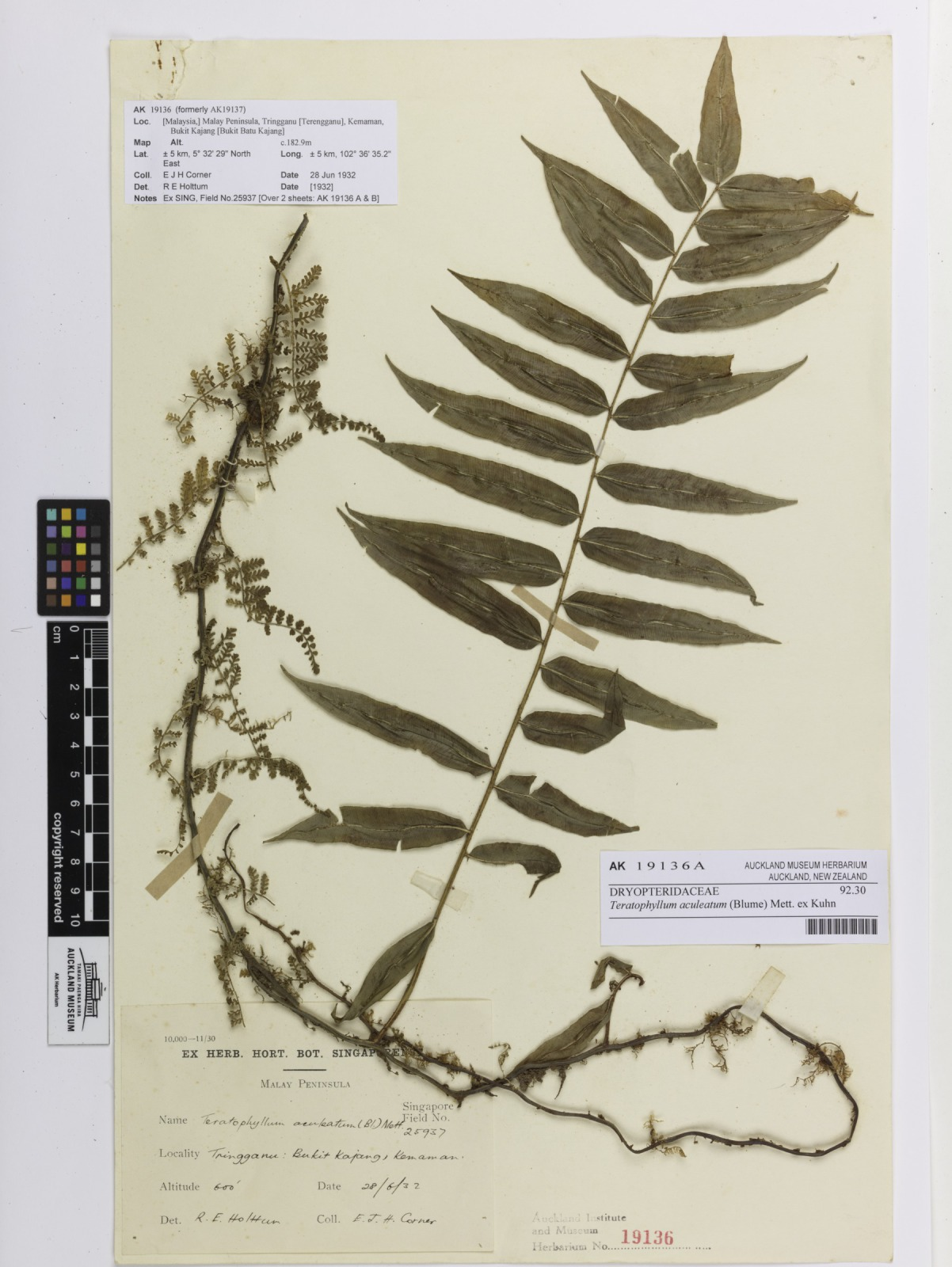
- Teratophyllum aculeatum

Scientific classification
- Kingdom: Plantae
- Clade: Tracheophytes
- Division: Polypodiophyta
- Class: Polypodiopsida
- Order: Polypodiales
- Suborder: Polypodiineae
- Family: Dryopteridaceae
- Subfamily: Elaphoglossoideae
- Genus: Teratophyllum; Mett. ex Kuhn

Species
- See text

= Teratophyllum =

Genus of ferns

Teratophyllum is a genus of ferns in the family Dryopteridaceae, subfamily Elaphoglossoideae, in the Pteridophyte Phylogeny Group classification of 2016 (PPG I). The genus is native to Malesia, Australia, and New Zealand.

== Taxonomy ==
Teratophyllum was attributed to Georg Heinrich Mettenius when it was first published by Friedrich Kuhn in 1869. The genus is recognized in the PPG I classification. As of October 2026, Plants of the World Online and the Checklist of Ferns and Lycophytes of the World also recognized the genus, but with a wider circumscription that included Arthrobotrya.

=== Species ===
As of October 2026, the Checklist of Ferns and Lycophytes of the World recognized the following 13 species:

- Teratophyllum aculeatum (Blume) Mett. ex Kuhn
- Teratophyllum arthropteroides (Christ) Holttum
- Teratophyllum articulatum (J.Sm. ex Fée) Mett. ex Kuhn
- Teratophyllum brightiae (F.Muell.) Holttum
- Teratophyllum clemensiae Holttum
- Teratophyllum gracile (Blume) Holttum
- Teratophyllum hainanense S.Y.Dong & X.C.Zhang
- Teratophyllum koordersii Holttum
- Teratophyllum leptocarpum (Fée) Holttum
- Teratophyllum ludens (Fée) Holttum
- Teratophyllum luzonicum Holttum
- Teratophyllum rotundifoliatum (R.Bonap.) Holttum
- Teratophyllum wilkesianum (Brack.) Holttum
