= Hypodematium =

Scientific classification
- Kingdom: Plantae
- Clade: Tracheophytes
- Division: Polypodiophyta
- Class: Polypodiopsida
- Order: Polypodiales
- Suborder: Polypodiineae
- Family: Hypodematiaceae
- Genus: Hypodematium; Kunze non Richard

Type species
- Hypodematium onustum Kunze 1833

Species
- See text

Genus of ferns

Hypodematium is a genus of ferns and is the type genus of the family Hypodematiaceae.

== Species ==
As of November 2025, the Checklist of Ferns and Lycophytes of the World recognized the twenty-eight species below.

- Hypodematium angustifolium C.S.Lee & K.H.Lee
- Hypodematium boonkerdii Pongkai, Li Bing Zhang & Pollawatn
- Hypodematium brevipilosum Li Bing Zhang, X.P.Fan & X.F.Gao
- Hypodematium chrysolepis (Fée) X.P.Fan & Li Bing Zhang
- Hypodematium confertivillosum J.X.Li, F.Q.Zhou & X.J.Li
- Hypodematium crenatum (Forssk.) Kuhn
- Hypodematium daochengense K.H.Shing
- Hypodematium delicatulum Rakotondr. & A.R.Sm.
- Hypodematium eglandulosum X.P.Fan, Liang Zhang & Li Bing Zhang
- Hypodematium fauriei (Kodama) Tagawa
- Hypodematium fordii (Baker) Ching
- Hypodematium glabrius (Copel.) Holttum
- Hypodematium glabrum Ching ex K.H.Shing
- Hypodematium glandulosopilosum (Tagawa) Ohwi
- Hypodematium glandulosum Ching ex K.H.Shing
- Hypodematium gracile Ching
- Hypodematium hirsutum (D.Don) Ching
- Hypodematium jianxiuii Xiao J.Li, nom. inval.
- Hypodematium parvisorum Li Bing Zhang, X.P.Fan & X.F.Gao
- Hypodematium phegopteroideum Kuhn
- Hypodematium ryukyuense Li Bing Zhang, X.P.Fan & X.F.Gao
- Hypodematium shingii Li Bing Zhang, X.P.Fan & X.F.Gao
- Hypodematium sinense K.Iwats.
- Hypodematium squamulosopilosum Ching
- Hypodematium subglabrum Li Bing Zhang, X.P.Fan & X.F.Gao
- Hypodematium truncatum Li Bing Zhang, X.P.Fan & X.F.Gao
- Hypodematium villosum F.G.Wang & F.W.Xing
- Hypodematium zhangii J.X.Li & Xiao J.Li

One hybrid has also been described: Hypodematium crenatum nothosubsp. tiwanae is the hybrid between H. hirsutum subsp. hirsutum and H. shingii, but it does not yet have a name at species level.

== Phylogeny ==
Phylogeny from Fern Tree of Life

- Hypodematium
  - - - H. confertivillosum Li, Zhou & Li
      - H. glandulosum Ching ex Shing
    - - H. fordii (Bak.) Ching
      - - H. gracile Ching
        - - - H. squamulosopilosum Ching
            - - H. angustifolium Lee & Lee
              - H. sinense Iwatsuki
          - - H. ryukyuense Zhang, Fan & Gao
            - - H. villosum Wang & Xing
              - - H. chrysolepis (Fée) Fan & Zhang
                - H. glandulosopilosum (Tagawa) Ohwi
  - - H. delicatulum Rakotondr. & Smith
    - - - H. daochengense K. H. Shing
        - - H. crenatum (Forssk.) Kuhn
          - H. hirsutum (Don) Ching
      - - H. eglandulosum Fan, Zhang & Zhang
        - - - H. boonkerdii Pongkai, Zhang & Pollawatn
            - H. shingii Zhang, Fan & Gao
          - - - H. parvisorum Zhang, Fan & Gao
              - H. subglabrum Zhang, Fan & Gao
            - - H. glabrum Ching ex Shing
              - - H. brevipilosum Zhang, Fan & Gao
                - H. truncatum Zhang, Fan & Gao

Other species include:
- H. glabrius (Copel.) Holtt.
- H. phegopteroideum Kuhn
- H. taiwanensis Ching ex Shing
