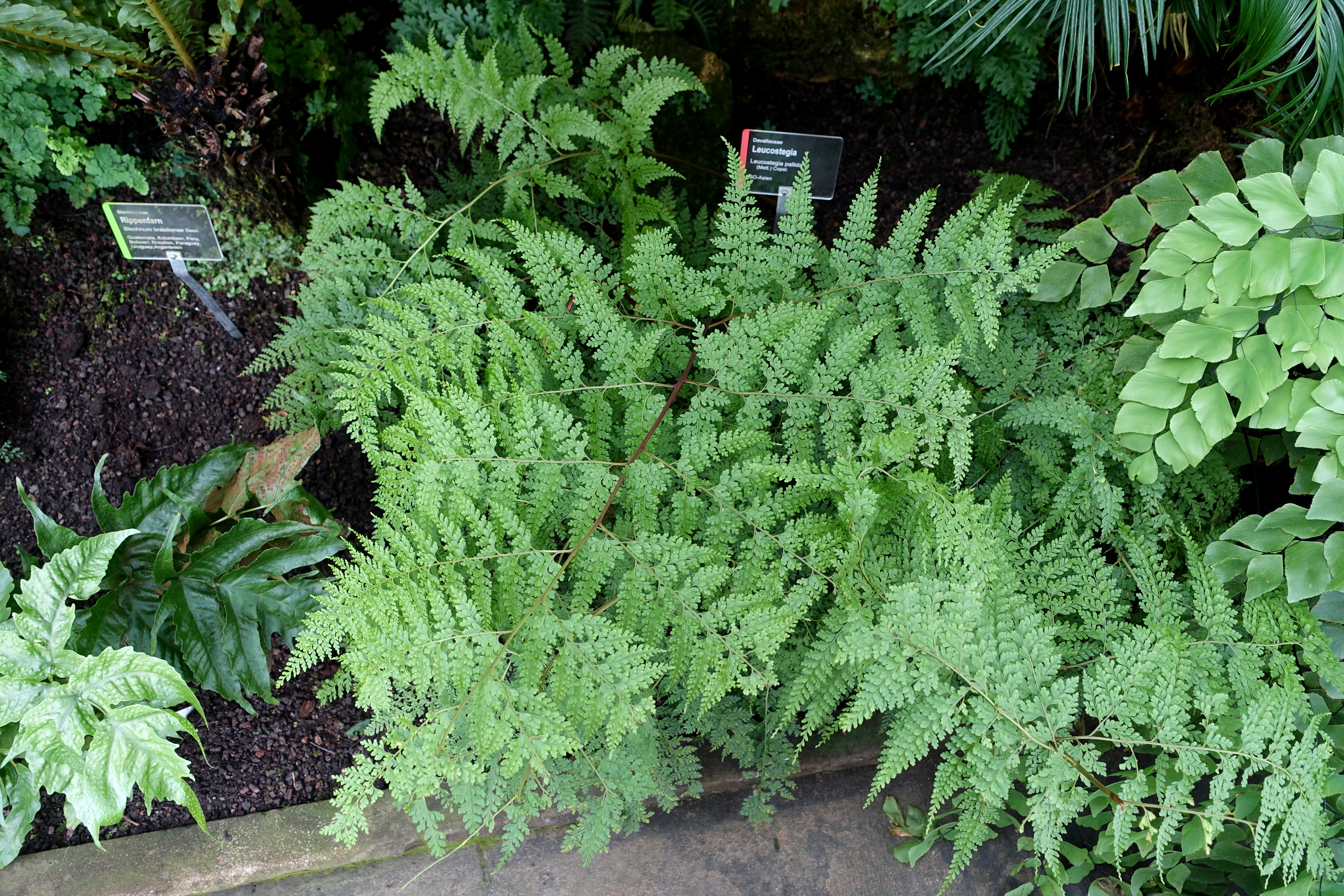
- Leucostegia pallida

Scientific classification
- Kingdom: Plantae
- Clade: Tracheophytes
- Division: Polypodiophyta
- Class: Polypodiopsida
- Order: Polypodiales
- Suborder: Polypodiineae
- Family: Hypodematiaceae
- Genus: Leucostegia; C.Presl

Type species
- Leucostegia immersa C.Presl

Species
- L. amplissima; L. immersa; L. pallida

= Leucostegia =

Genus of ferns

Leucostegia is a genus of ferns in the family Hypodematiaceae in the Pteridophyte Phylogeny Group classification of 2016 (PPG I).

== Species ==
As of November 2025, the Checklist of Ferns and Lycophytes of the World recognized the three species below.

- Leucostegia amplissia (Christ) C.W.Chen
- Leucostegia immersa C.Presl
- Leucostegia pallida (Mett.) Copel.

== Phylogeny ==
Phylogeny from Fern Tree of Life

- Leucostegia
  - L. pallida (Mettenius ex Kuhn) Copeland
  - - L. amplissima (Christ) Chen
    - L. immersa Presl
