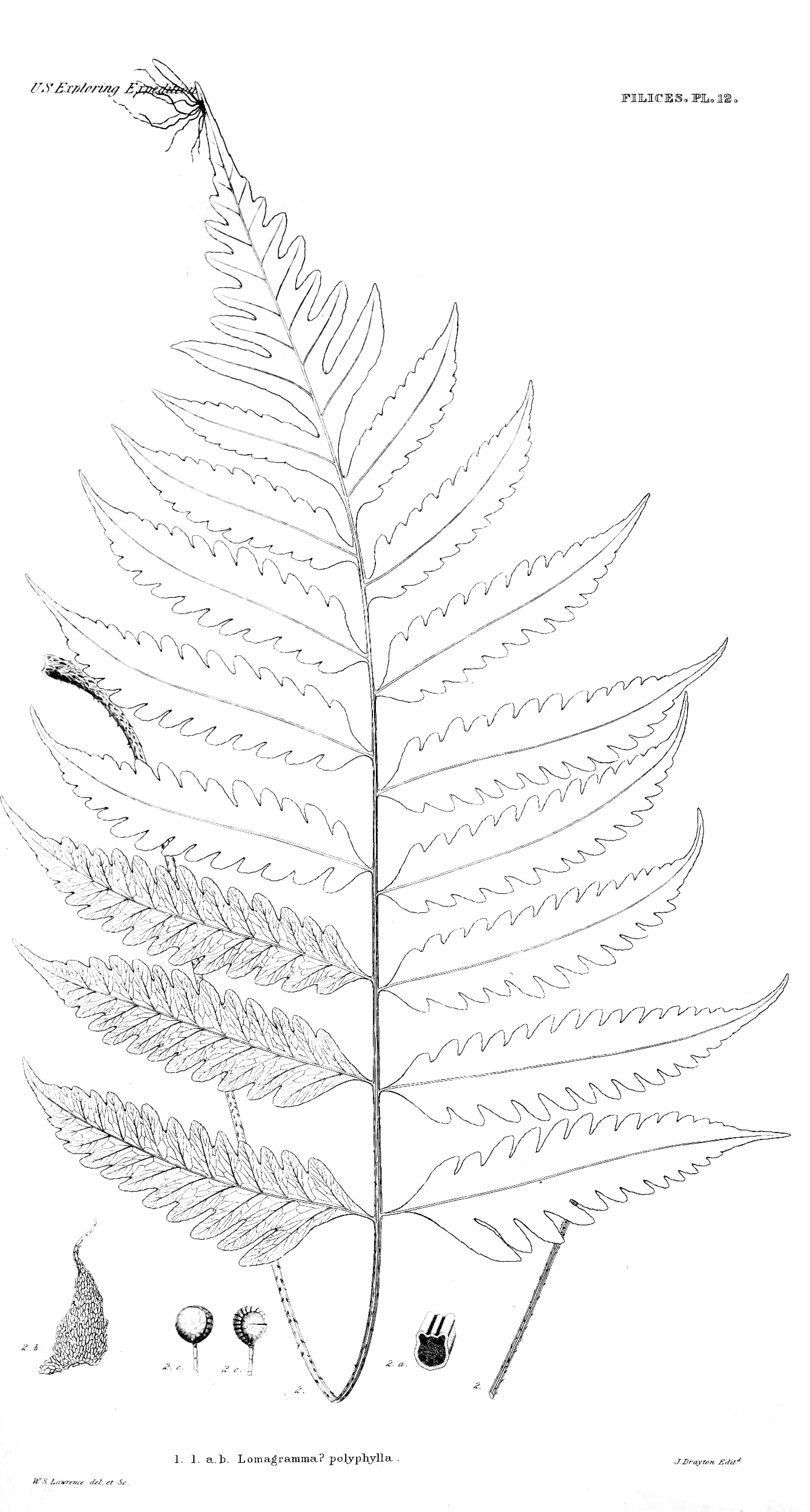
- Botanical illustration of Lomagramma polyphylla

Scientific classification
- Kingdom: Plantae
- Clade: Tracheophytes
- Division: Polypodiophyta
- Class: Polypodiopsida
- Order: Polypodiales
- Suborder: Polypodiineae
- Family: Dryopteridaceae
- Subfamily: Elaphoglossoideae
- Genus: Lomagramma; J.Sm.

Species
- See text.

= Lomagramma =

Genus of ferns

Lomagramma is a genus of ferns in the family Dryopteridaceae, subfamily Elaphoglossoideae, in the Pteridophyte Phylogeny Group classification of 2016 (PPG I).

== Taxonomy ==
Lomagramma was first described by John Smith in 1841. The genus is recognized in the PPG I classification, and, As of October 2026, by the Checklist of Ferns and Lycophytes of the World and Plants of the World Online.

=== Species ===
As of November 2026, the Checklist of Ferns and Lycophytes of the World, World Flora Online, and Plants of the World Online all recognized the following 18 species in Lomagramma:

- Lomagramma angustipinna Copel.
- Lomagramma brassii Holttum
- Lomagramma brooksii Copel.
- Lomagramma copelandii Holttum
- Lomagramma cordipinna Holttum
- Lomagramma cultrata (Baker) Holttum
- Lomagramma leucolepis Holttum
- Lomagramma lomarioides (Blume) J.Sm.
- Lomagramma melanolepis Alderw.
- Lomagramma merrillii Holttum
- Lomagramma novoguineensis (Brause) C.Chr.
- Lomagramma perakensis Bedd.
- Lomagramma polyphylla Brack.
- Lomagramma pteroides J.Sm.
- Lomagramma sinuata C.Chr.
- Lomagramma sorbifolia (Willd.) Ching
- Lomagramma sumatrana Alderw.
- Lomagramma tahitensis Holttum
