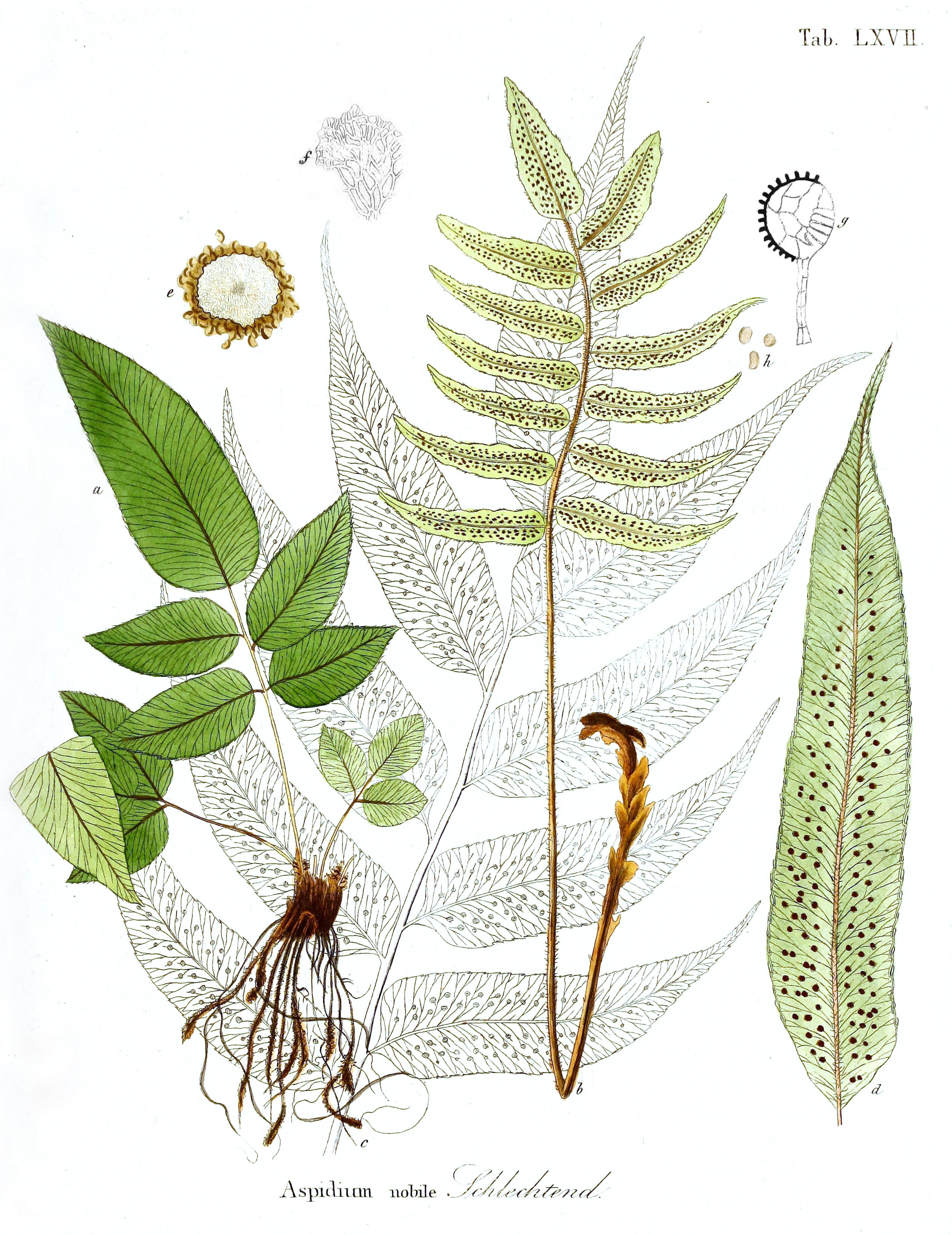
- Botanical illustration of Phanerophlebia nobilis

Scientific classification
- Kingdom: Plantae
- Clade: Tracheophytes
- Division: Polypodiophyta
- Class: Polypodiopsida
- Order: Polypodiales
- Suborder: Polypodiineae
- Family: Dryopteridaceae
- Subfamily: Dryopteridoideae
- Genus: Phanerophlebia; C.Presl

Species
- See text.

= Phanerophlebia (plant) =

Genus of ferns

Phanerophlebia is a genus of ferns in the family Dryopteridaceae, subfamily Dryopteridoideae, according to the Pteridophyte Phylogeny Group classification of 2016 (PPG I).

== Taxonomy ==
Phanerophlebia was first described by Carl Presl in 1836.

=== Species ===
As of November 2026, the Checklist of Ferns and Lycophytes of the World, World Flora Online, and Plants of the World Online recognized the following ten species in Phanerophlebia:

- Phanerophlebia auriculata Underw.
- Phanerophlebia aurita Fée
- Phanerophlebia gastonyi Yatsk.
- Phanerophlebia haitiensis C.Chr.
- Phanerophlebia juglandifolia (Humb. & Bonpl. ex Willd.) J.Sm.
- Phanerophlebia macrosora (Baker) Underw.
- Phanerophlebia nobilis (Schltdl. & Cham.) C.Presl
- Phanerophlebia pumila (M.Martens & Galeotti) Fée
- Phanerophlebia remotispora E.Fourn.
- Phanerophlebia umbonata Underw.
