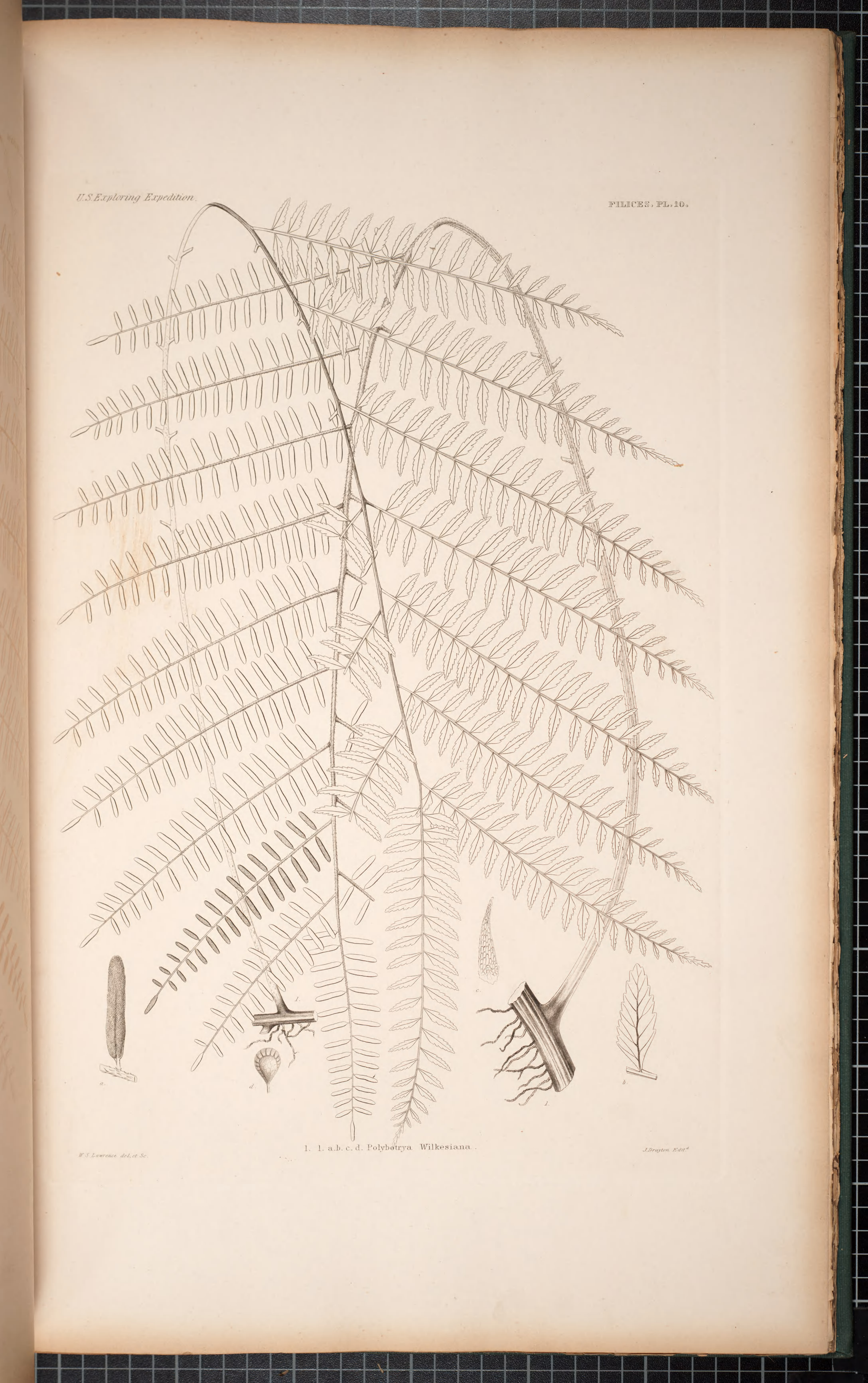
- Arthrobotrya wilkesiana

Scientific classification
- Kingdom: Plantae
- Clade: Tracheophytes
- Division: Polypodiophyta
- Class: Polypodiopsida
- Order: Polypodiales
- Suborder: Polypodiineae
- Family: Dryopteridaceae
- Subfamily: Elaphoglossoideae
- Genus: Arthrobotrya; J.Sm.

Species
- See text

= Arthrobotrya =

Genus of ferns

Arthrobotrya is a genus of ferns in the family Dryopteridaceae, subfamily Elaphoglossoideae, in the Pteridophyte Phylogeny Group classification of 2016 (PPG I). The genus is native to Australia and New Zealand.

== Taxonomy ==
Arthrobotrya was first described by John Smith in 1875. The genus is recognized in the PPG I classification, and by the Checklist of Ferns and Lycophytes of the World. Plants of the World Online sinks the genus into Teratophyllum.

=== Species ===
As of January 2020, the Checklist of Ferns and Lycophytes of the World recognized the following species:

- Arthrobotrya articulata (J.Sm. ex Fée) J.Sm.
- Arthrobotrya brightiae (F.Muell.) Pic.Serm.
- Arthrobotrya wilkesiana (Brack.) Copel.
