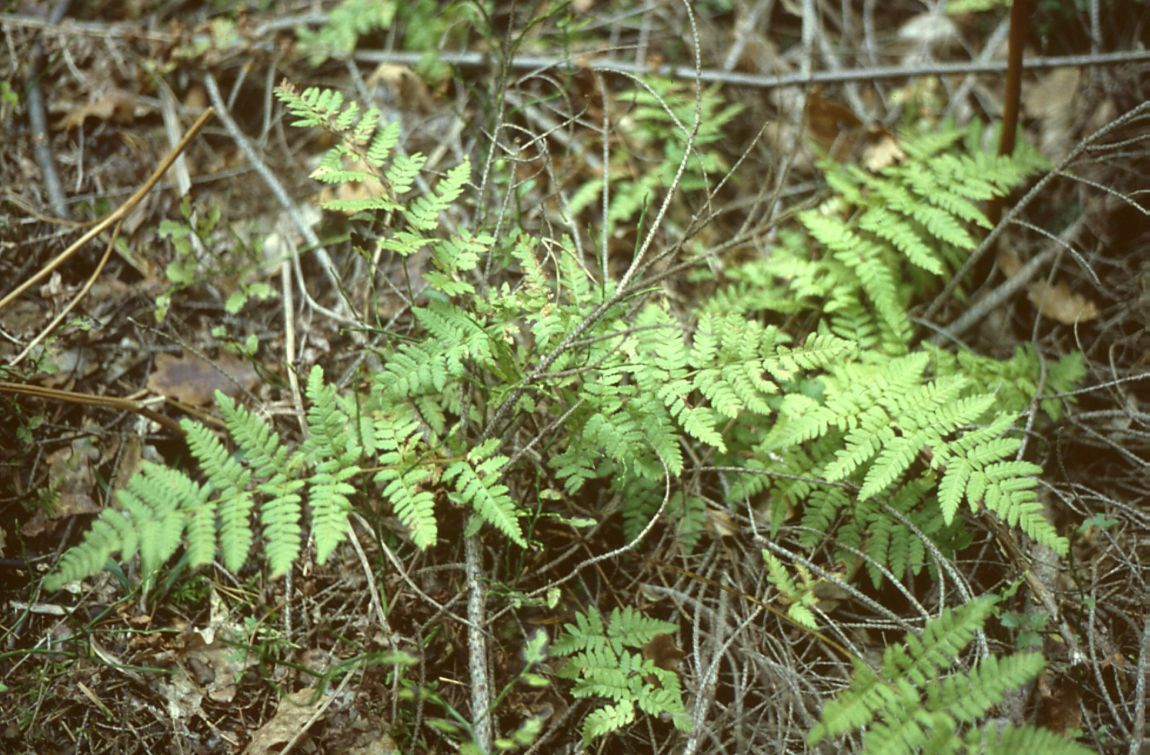
- Dryopteris carthusiana

Scientific classification
- Kingdom: Plantae
- Clade: Tracheophytes
- Division: Polypodiophyta
- Class: Polypodiopsida
- Order: Polypodiales
- Suborder: Polypodiineae
- Family: Dryopteridaceae; Herter (nom. cons.)

Subfamilies
- Dryopteridoideae; Elaphoglossoideae; Polybotryoideae

Synonyms
- Bolbitidaceae Ching 1978; Elaphoglossaceae Pichi-Sermolli 1968; Filicaceae de Jussieu 1789 nom. ill.; Peranemataceae Ching 1940 non Buetschli 1884

= Dryopteridaceae =

Family of ferns

The Dryopteridaceae are a family of leptosporangiate ferns in the order Polypodiales. They are known colloquially as the wood ferns. In the Pteridophyte Phylogeny Group classification of 2016 (PPG I), the family is placed in the suborder Polypodiineae. Alternatively, it may be treated as the subfamily Dryopteridoideae of a very broadly defined family Polypodiaceae sensu lato.

The family contains about 1700 species and has a cosmopolitan distribution. Species may be terrestrial, epipetric, hemiepiphytic, or epiphytic. Many are cultivated as ornamental plants. The largest genera are Elaphoglossum (600+), Polystichum (260), Dryopteris (225), and Ctenitis (150). These four genera contain about 70% of the species. Dryopteridaceae diverged from the other families in eupolypods I about 100 million years ago. The fossil record appears to show the earliest members of the group emerging some 99 MYA during the Mid Cretaceous.

== Description ==
The rhizomes are often stout, creeping, ascending, or erect, and sometimes scandent or climbing, with nonclathrate scales at apices. Fronds are usually monomorphic, less often dimorphic, or sometimes scaly or glandular, but less commonly hairy. Petioles have numerous round, vascular bundles arranged in a ring, or rarely as few as three; the adaxial bundles are largest. Veins are pinnate or forking, free to variously anastomosing; the areoles occur with or without included veinlets; sori are usually round, acrostichoid (covering the entire abaxial surface of the lamina) in a few lineages; usually indusiate, or sometimes exindusiate. Indusia, when present, are round-reniform or peltate. Sporangia have three-rowed, short to long stalks; spores are reniform, monolete, perine or winged.

== Taxonomy ==
=== History ===
In 1990, Karl U. Kramer and coauthors defined the Dryopteridaceae broadly to include the present family, as well as the Woodsiaceae sensu lato, Onocleaceae, and most of Tectariaceae. Molecular phylogenetic studies found Kramer's version of the Dryopteridaceae to be polyphyletic, and it was split up by Smith and others in 2006. The inclusion of Didymochlaena, Hypodematium, and Leucostegia in the Dryopteridaceae is doubtful. If these three are excluded, then the family is strongly supported as monophyletic in cladistic analyses. Some authors have already treated these genera as outside of the Dryopteridaceae.

In 2007, a phylogenetic study of DNA sequences showed that Pleocnemia should be transferred from the Tectariaceae to the Dryopteridaceae. In 2010, in a paper on bolbitidoid ferns, Arthrobotrya was resurrected from Teratophyllum. Later that year, Mickelia was described as a new genus.

Some species have been removed from the genus Oenotrichia because they do not belong there or even in the family Dennstaedtiaceae where Oenotrichia sensu stricto is placed. These species probably belong in the Dryopteridaceae, but have not yet been given a generic name.

In 2012, a phylogenetic study of Dryopteris and its relatives included Acrophorus, Acrorumohra, Diacalpe, Dryopsis, Nothoperanema, and Peranema within that genus. The Flora of China treatment of the family, published in 2013, used phylogenetic results to sink Lithostegia and Phanerophlebiopsis into Arachniodes.

The Dryopteridaceae Herter, under the classification system of Christenhusz and Chase (2014), were submerged as subfamily Dryopteridoideae Link, one of eight subfamilies constituting family Polypodiaceae. This family corresponds to the clade eupolypods I. The Pteridophyte Phylogeny Group classification of 2016 (PPG I) retained the family.

=== Phylogeny ===
The following cladogram for the suborder Polypodiineae (eupolypods I), based on the consensus cladogram in the Pteridophyte Phylogeny Group classification of 2016 (PPG I), shows a likely phylogenetic relationship between Dryopteridaceae and the other families of the clade.

- Polypodiineae (eupolypods I)
  - Didymochlaenaceae
  - - Hypodematiaceae
    - - Dryopteridaceae
      - - - Nephrolepidaceae
          - Lomariopsidaceae
        - - Tectariaceae
          - - Oleandraceae
            - - Davalliaceae
              - Polypodiaceae

=== Subdivision ===
Phylogeny of Dryopteridaceae

- - - Elaphoglossoideae
      - Lastreopsideae
        - Parapolystichum
        - - Lastreopsis
          - - Rumohra
            - Megalastrum
      - Bolbitideae
        - Pleocnemia
        - - Bolbitis
          - - - Lomagramma
              - - Arthrobotrya
                - Teratophyllum
            - - Mickelia
              - Elaphoglossum
  - - Polybotryoideae
      - Stigmatopteris
      - - - Trichoneuron
          - Polystichopsis
        - - Olfersia
          - - Maxonia
            - - Cyclodium
              - Polybotrya
    - Dryopteridoideae
      - - Ctenitideae
          Ctenitis
      - - Polysticheae
          - - Phanerophlebia
            - Cyrtomium
          - Polystichum
        - Dryopterideae
          - Arachniodes
          - Dryopteris

The PPG I classification divides the family into three subfamilies, listed below.

- Subfamily Polybotryoideae H.M.Liu & X.C.Zhang
  - Cyclodium C.Presl
  - Maxonia C.Chr.
  - Olfersia Raddi
  - Polybotrya Humb. & Bonpl. ex Willd.
  - Polystichopsis (J.Sm.) Holttum
  - Stigmatopteris C.Chr.
  - Trichoneuron Ching
- Subfamily Elaphoglossoideae (Pic.Serm.) Crabbe, Jermy & Mickel
  - Arthrobotrya J.Sm.
  - Bolbitis Schott
  - Elaphoglossum Schott ex J.Sm.
  - Lastreopsis Ching
  - Lomagramma J.Sm.
  - Megalastrum Holttum
  - Mickelia R.C.Moran, Labiak & Sundue
  - Parapolystichum (Keyserl.) Ching
  - Pleocnemia C.Presl
  - Rumohra Raddi
  - Teratophyllum Mett. ex Kuhn
- Subfamily Dryopteridoideae Link
  - Arachniodes Blume
  - Ctenitis (C.Chr.) C.Chr.
  - Cyrtomium C.Presl
  - Dryopteris Adans.
  - Phanerophlebia C.Presl
  - Polystichum Roth

Didymochlaena has been removed to Didymochlaenaceae, and Hypodematium and Leucostegia to Hypodematiaceae. Aenigmopteris has at times been suggested to belong to this family, on the grounds of its morphological similarity to Ctenitis, but molecular phylogeny has led to its submersion within Tectaria (Tectariaceae). Dryopolystichum has been placed in Lomariopsidaceae.

== Bibliography ==
- Smith, Alan R.; Pryer, Kathleen M.; Schuettpelz, Eric; Korall, Petra; Schneider, Harald; Wolf, Paul G. (1 January 2006). "A Classification for Extant Ferns" (PDF). Taxon. 55 (3): 705–731. Bibcode:2006Taxon..55..705S. doi:10.2307/25065646. JSTOR 25065646.
