= Sword fern =

Sword fern is a common name for several ferns and may refer to:

- Nephrolepis, a tropical genus of ferns, especially:
  - Nephrolepis exaltata, commonly cultivated as a houseplant, including the Boston fern
- Polystichum, a cosmopolitan genus of ferns, especially:
  - Polystichum munitum, native to western North America
- Giant swordfern
