= Tuber ladder fern =

Tuber ladder fern is a common name for several plants and may refer to:

- Nephrolepis cordifolia, or fishbone fern
- Nephrolepis exaltata, or sword fern
