= Dracoglossum =

Scientific classification
- Kingdom: Plantae
- Clade: Tracheophytes
- Division: Polypodiophyta
- Class: Polypodiopsida
- Order: Polypodiales
- Suborder: Polypodiineae
- Family: Lomariopsidaceae
- Genus: Dracoglossum; Christenh.

Type species
- Dracoglossum plantagineum (Jacq.) Christenhusz

Species
- See text

Synonyms
- D. plantagineum; D. sinuatum

Genus of ferns

Dracoglossum is a small genus of ferns in the family Lomariopsidaceae, according to the Pteridophyte Phylogeny Group classification of 2016 (PPG I). It is native to the Neotropics of the Americas.

== Taxonomy ==
Dracoglossum was originally treated in Tectaria, but is not related and was therefore placed in the family Dryopteridaceae. It appears to be most closely related to the genus Lomariopsis. Molecular evidence has confirmed this placement and it is now firmly placed in family Lomariopsidaceae, with which it shares characters of habit and stelar structure.

== Species ==
As of February 2020, the Checklist of Ferns and Lycophytes of the World and Plants of the World Online recognized two species:

- Dracoglossum plantagineum (Jacq.) Christenh. — Central America, the Lesser Antilles, Puerto Rico, and sub-Andean South America
- Dracoglossum sinuatum (Fée) Christenh. — the Guianas and coastal Ecuador

The species differ in the presence or absence of an indusium covering each of their sori. Dracoglossum has a creeping rhizome. The leaves are simple and proliferate by vegetative buds (leaf buds) at the apex.
