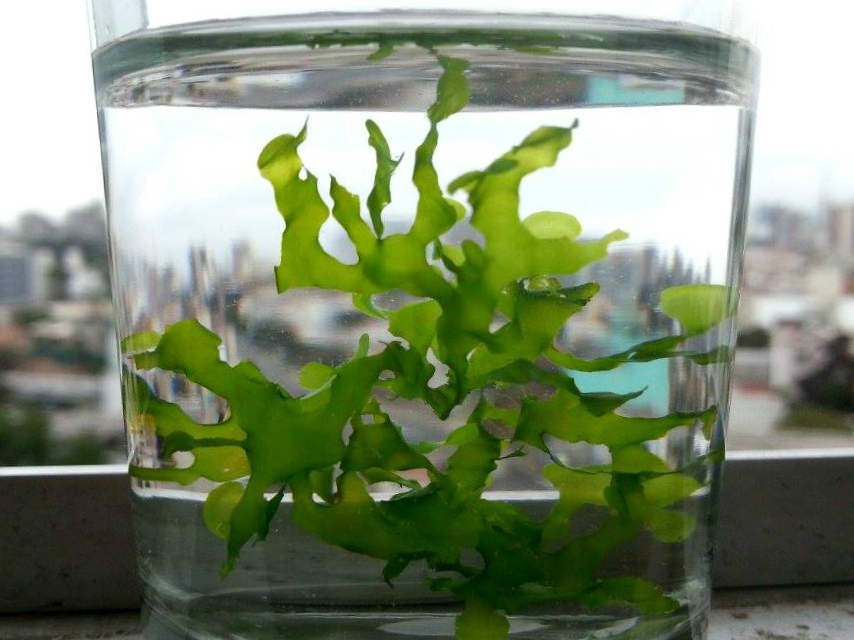
- Gametophyte growing in water
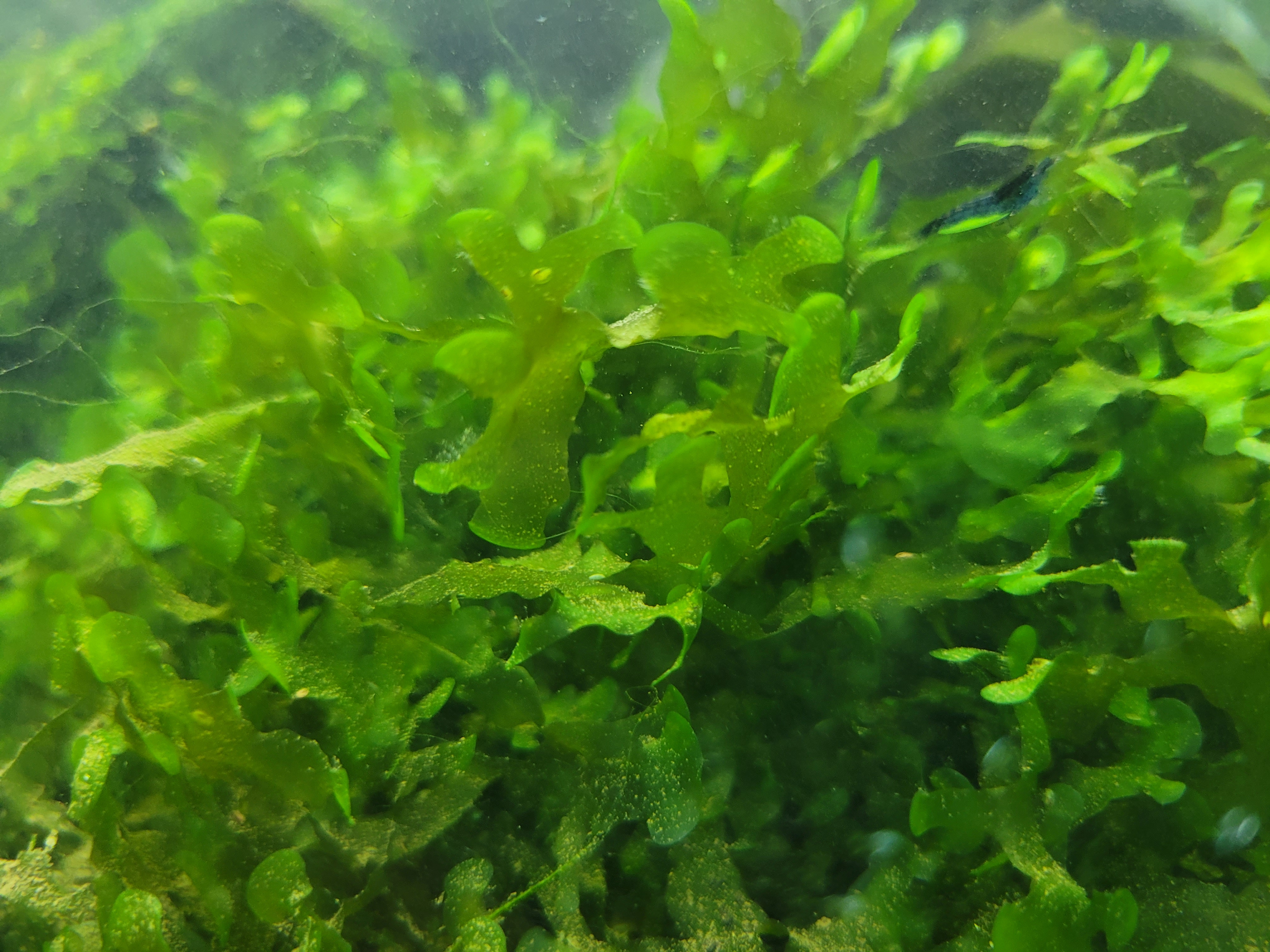
- Lomariopsis gametophytes are commonly sold in the aquarium industry

Scientific classification
- Kingdom: Plantae
- Clade: Tracheophytes
- Division: Polypodiophyta
- Class: Polypodiopsida
- Order: Polypodiales
- Suborder: Polypodiineae
- Family: Lomariopsidaceae
- Genus: Lomariopsis
- Species: L. lineata

Binomial name
- Lomariopsis lineata (C.Presl) Holttum

Synonyms
- Acrostichum laurifolium Christ; Acrostichum speciosum C.Presl; Diplora cadieri Christ; Lomaria spondiaefolia Wall.; Lomaria spondiifolia Wall.; Lomariopsis cochinchinensis Fée; Lomariopsis longifolia (Wall.) J.Sm.; Lomariopsis papyracea Copel.; Lomariopsis smithii Fée; Olfersia lineata C.Presl; Stenochlaena abrupta Alderw.; Stenochlaena cochinchinensis (Fée) Underw.; Stenochlaena longifolia J.Sm.; Stenochlaena smithii (Fée) Underw.; Stenochlaena spondiaefolia C.Presl; Stenochlaena spondicifolia J.Sm.; Stenochlaena spondiifolia (Wall.) C.Presl

= Süsswassertang =

Species of fern

Lomariopsis lineata is a species of fern native to South East Asia. The prothallia of this species (or possibly a closely related species) are commonly cultivated as an aquarium plant, where it is known to aquarists as süsswassertang (German spelling: Süßwassertang). It is often incorrectly spelled "subwassertang" due to the German eszett's similarity to the Latin 'B'. It is also called Loma fern or round pellia.

== Description ==
Adult leaves are pinnate and up to 1 meter in length. It is found in humid forests up to 1,200 meters above sea level. It may grow epiphytic on trees or among rocks in dry river beds.

Flora of China separates a Chinese form as L. cochinchinensis, but this plant is otherwise considered a synonym of L. lineata. The species may grow to be 3 meters in length. In Singapore, L. lineata is considered critically endangered in the wild.

== Süsswassertang ==
Süsswassertang is used as a decorative aquarium plant. It was first discovered in the aquarium of botanist Christel Kasselmann in 2001, who then distributed it to other hobby aquarists. The wild origin of Kasselmann's specimen is unknown. The name süsswassertang means "freshwater seaweed" in German. It was long considered to be a liverwort, which it strongly resembles. All specimens in the aquarium trade are assumed to be clones of the original plant introduced in 2001. In the aquarium industry, it is commonly confused with similar-looking liverworts of the genera Pellia and Monosolenium.

In 2009, a molecular phylogenetic study determined that it is, in fact, a fern gametophyte. It was found to be most closely genetically linked to Lomariopsis lineata, though classification as a distinct species was not ruled out. Efforts to induce süsswassertang specimens to form a sporophyte have failed, which may indicate status as a new species. It is sometimes described as Lomariopsis cf. lineata.

=== Characteristics ===
In captivity, reproduction is by fragmentation. Pieces that break off develop into new plants. The plant is thalloid in form, and exhibits indeterminate growth. It is profusely branched, and 1 cell-layer thick. Gametangia are rarely produced. The archegonia have short necks and the venter (base) is partly sunk into the thallus. The antheridia are like those of polypodialean ferns in that they consist of a basal cell, a ring cell, and a cap cell.

The species is capable of absorbing the neurotoxin BMAA from contaminated waters.

== See also ==
- Vittaria appalachiana
