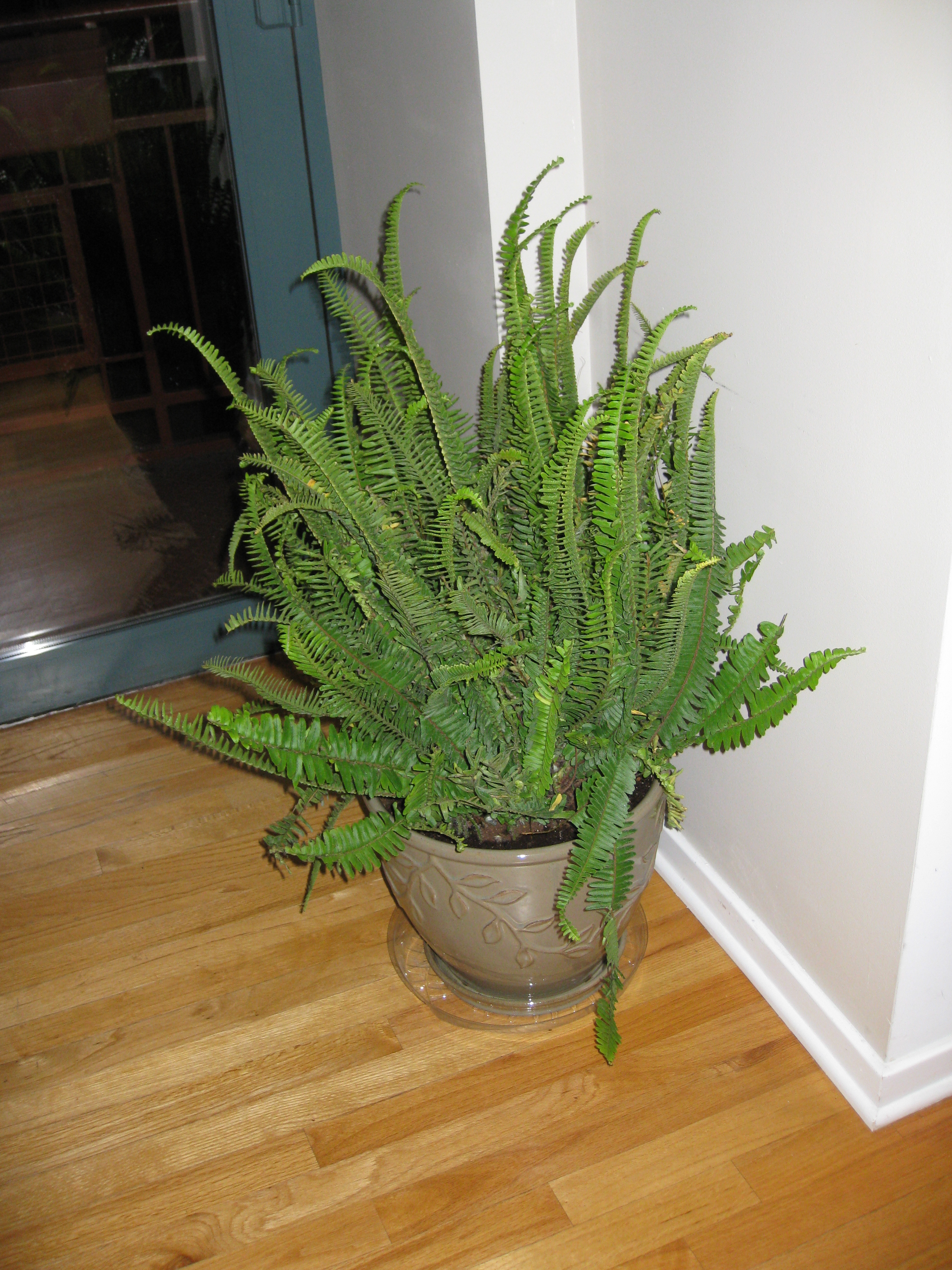
- Kimberley Queen fern (Nephrolepis obliterata)

Scientific classification
- Kingdom: Plantae
- Clade: Tracheophytes
- Division: Polypodiophyta
- Class: Polypodiopsida
- Order: Polypodiales
- Suborder: Polypodiineae
- Family: Nephrolepidaceae
- Genus: Nephrolepis
- Species: N. obliterata

Binomial name
- Nephrolepis obliterata (R.Br.) J.Sm.

= Nephrolepis obliterata =

Kimberley Queen fern

Species of fern

Nephrolepis obliterata, the Kimberley Queen fern or Australian swordfern, is a species of fern in the family Nephrolepidaceae. This fern originated in Australia, but is relatively easy to cultivate indoors worldwide.

The often misspelled "Kimberley Queen" name correctly has a second "e" in the first name as is trademarked by Westland Laboratories Ply. Ltd.

The Kimberley Queen is not as well known as the Boston fern. Because it is not as sensitive to a lack of humidity, it is better suited for the typical indoor environment.

== Cultivation ==
Nephrolepis obliterata prefer bright, but indirect sunlight. Temperatures between 16 °C and 24 °C are best. Nephrolepis obliterata is sensitive to both too little and too much water, so water the plant well but permit the soil to dry out between waterings.

Nephrolepis obliterata has the added benefit of reducing indoor air pollution, particularly formaldehyde, xylene, and toluene.
