= Dryopolystichum =

Scientific classification
- Kingdom: Plantae
- Clade: Tracheophytes
- Division: Polypodiophyta
- Class: Polypodiopsida
- Order: Polypodiales
- Suborder: Polypodiineae
- Family: Lomariopsidaceae
- Genus: Dryopolystichum; Copel.
- Species: D. phaeostigma

Binomial name
- Dryopolystichum phaeostigma (Ces.) Copel.

Synonyms
- Aspidium phaeostigma Ces.; Dryopteris cyclosorum van Alderwerelt van Rosenburgh; Dryopteris kingii Copel.; Dryopteris ledermannii Brause; Dryopteris phaeostigma (Ces.) C.Chr.; Dryopteris tamatana C.Chr.; Polystichum lastreoides Rosenst.

Genus of ferns

Dryopolystichum is a genus of ferns in the family Lomariopsidaceae, with a single species Dryopolystichum phaeostigma.

== Taxonomy ==
The genus Dryopolystichum was first erected by Edwin Copeland in 1947 for the species Aspidium phaeostigma. In the Pteridophyte Phylogeny Group classification of 2016 (PPG I), the genus was placed in the family Dryopteridaceae, although left unplaced as to subfamily. It has since been transferred to the family Lomariopsidaceae as a result of molecular phylogenetic evidence.
