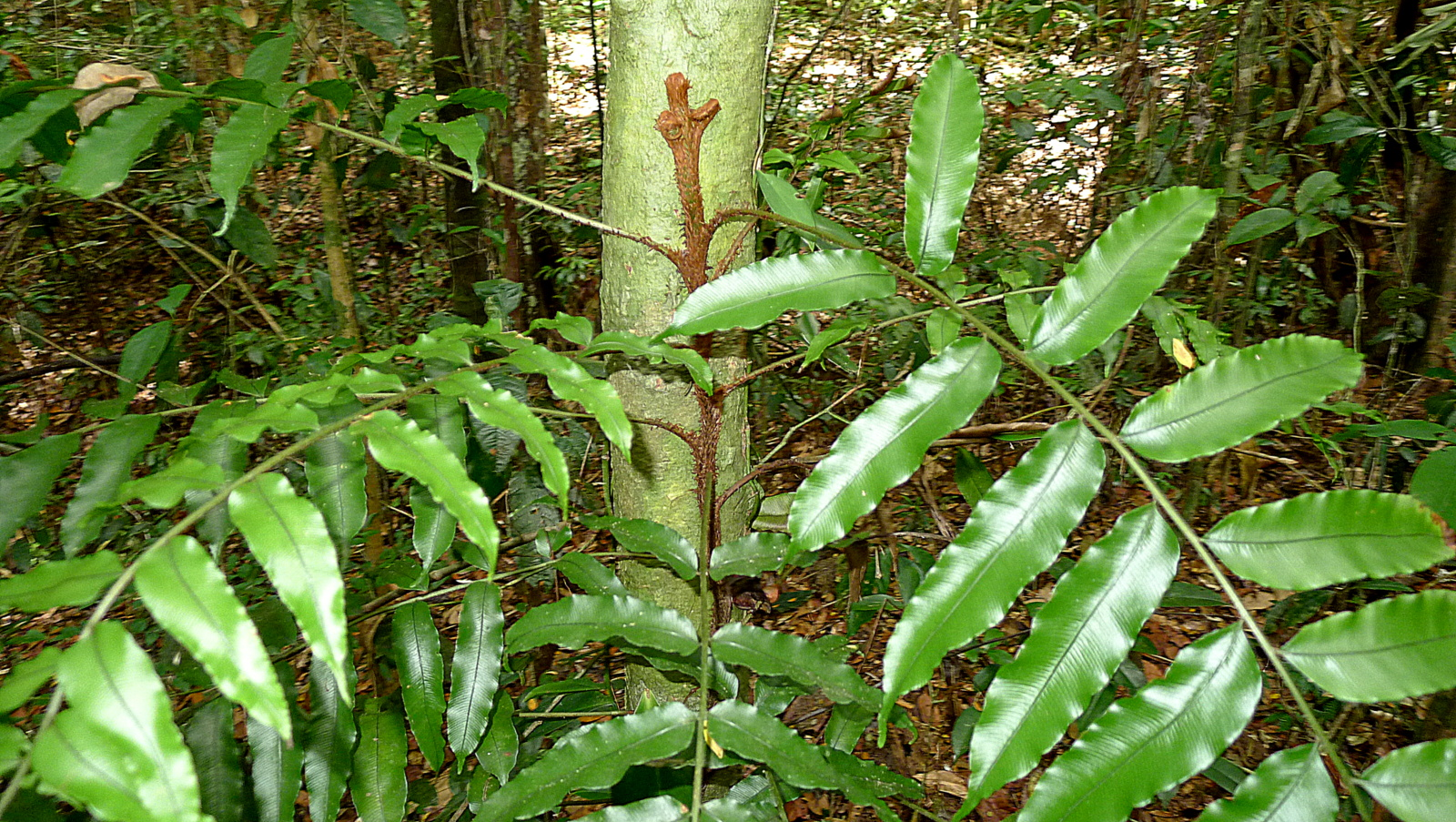

Scientific classification
- Kingdom: Plantae
- Clade: Tracheophytes
- Division: Polypodiophyta
- Class: Polypodiopsida
- Order: Polypodiales
- Suborder: Polypodiineae
- Family: Lomariopsidaceae
- Genus: Lomariopsis
- Species: L. marginata

Binomial name
- Lomariopsis marginata (Schrad.) Kuhn

Synonyms
- Acrostichum erythrodes Kunze; Lomaria fraxinifolia Raddi; Lomaria marginata Schrad.; Lomaria scandens Raddi; Lomariopsis elongata Fée; Lomariopsis erythrodes (Kunze) Fée; Lomariopsis fraxinifolia (Raddi) Pic.Serm.; Lomariopsis lanceolata Holttum; Lomariopsis speciosa Holttum; Stenochlaena erythrodes (Kunze) Underw.; Stenochlaena marginata (Schrad.) C.Chr.

= Lomariopsis marginata =

Species of fern

Lomariopsis marginata is a fern in the family Lomariopsidaceae. It is native to Brazil and possibly French Guiana.
