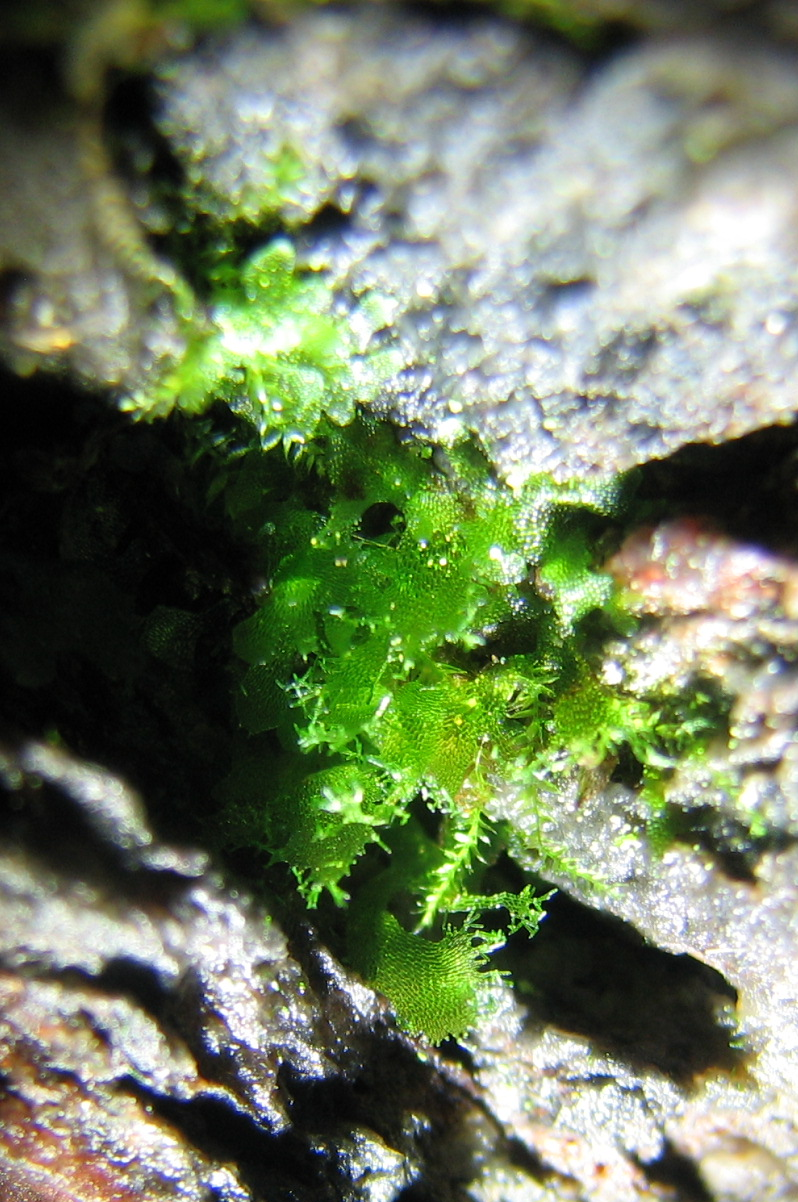

Conservation status
- Apparently Secure (NatureServe)

Scientific classification
- Kingdom: Plantae
- Clade: Tracheophytes
- Division: Polypodiophyta
- Class: Polypodiopsida
- Order: Polypodiales
- Family: Pteridaceae
- Genus: Vittaria
- Species: V. appalachiana

Binomial name
- Vittaria appalachiana Farrar & Mickel

= Vittaria appalachiana =

Species of fern

Vittaria appalachiana, or the Appalachian shoestring fern, is a fern species in the subfamily Vittarioideae of the family Pteridaceae. It is native to moist and shaded outcrops in the Appalachian Mountains. It is notable for existing only in the gametophyte stage of development, unlike other fern species in which the sporophyte stage predominates. The species reproduces asexually through gemmae.

The species was known to bryologists, who at first confused it with a liverwort. Aaron John Sharp brought the species to the attention of pteridologists Warren H. Wagner and Alma Gracey Stokey. It was formally named by Donald R. Farrar & John T. Mickel in 1991.

== Description ==
The sporophyte (normally the dominant generation of the fern life cycle) is almost never formed in this species. Tiny sporophytes have been found at one site in Ohio, and have twice been produced in culture. The few V. appalachiana sporophytes known have had rhizomes with clathrate (lattice-patterned) scales, and undivided, linear fronds less than 5 millimeters (0.2 in) long, features typical of vittarioid ferns except for their small size.

Most populations of V. appalachiana are composed solely of gametophytes, which take the form of a thin green thallus, which is sparsely to extensively branched. The thallus bears filament-like structures called gemmae which project from its margin near the tips of the branches. The gemmae can fragment from the parent and grow into a new gametophyte. They vary in size from 2 to 12 body cells in length. Rhizoid primordia are present only on the two end cells of the gemmae, and are sometimes lacking from one or both. In general, gemma production is less uniform than in the gametophytes of other species of Vittaria.

== Habitat ==
Vittaria appalachiana grows in dense colonies in dark, moist crevices in non-calcareous rock. Habitats are usually dark and sheltered from extremes of temperature, and humidity; rock shelters and smaller cavities are favored. It occasionally appears as an epiphyte, growing on the bases of trees protected within narrow gorges. Populations have been found at altitudes from 150 to 1,800 meters (490 to 5,900 ft).

== See also ==
- Süsswassertang, another fern known only from its gametophyte stage.
