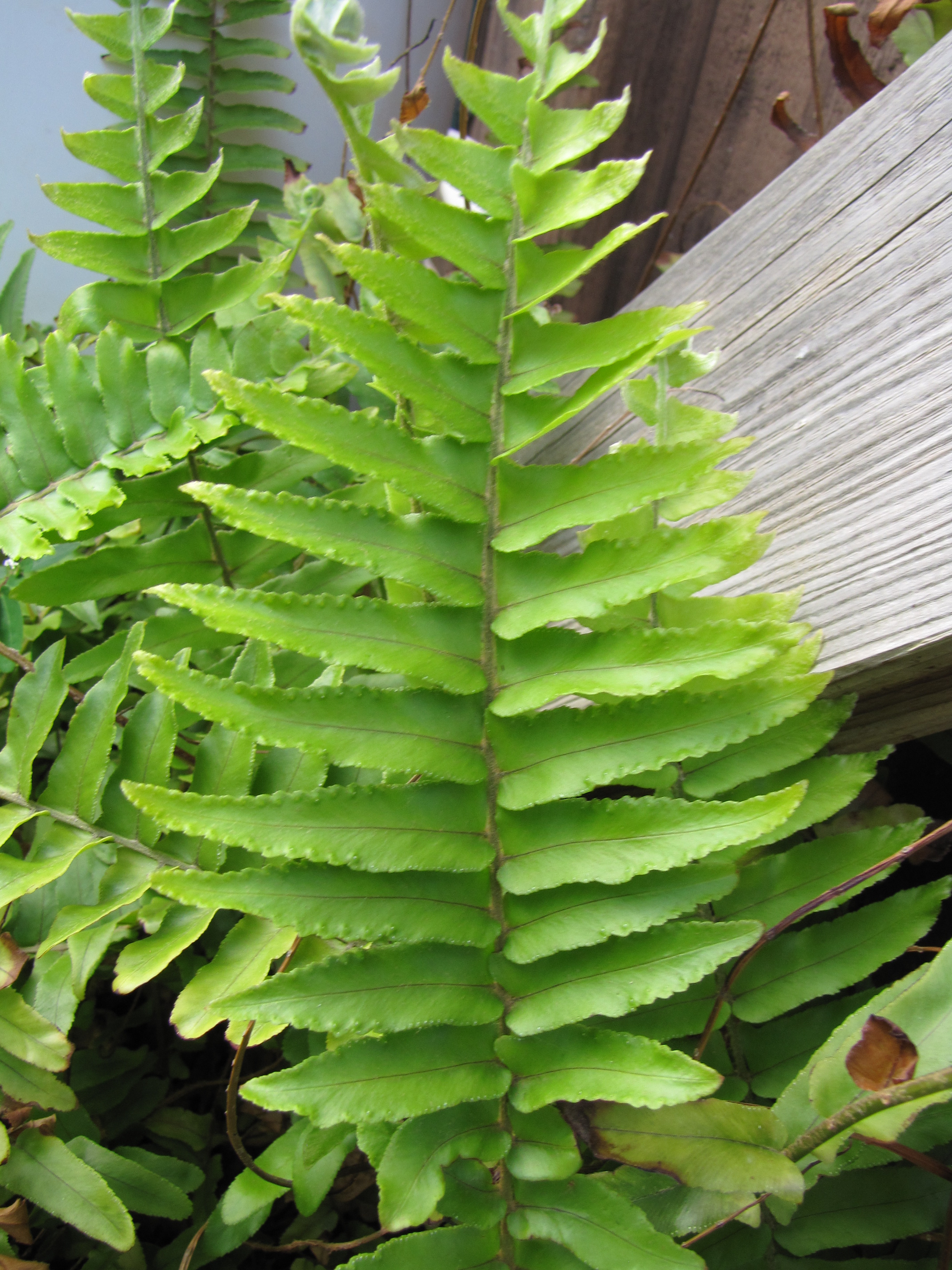

Scientific classification
- Kingdom: Plantae
- Clade: Tracheophytes
- Division: Polypodiophyta
- Class: Polypodiopsida
- Order: Polypodiales
- Suborder: Polypodiineae
- Family: Nephrolepidaceae
- Genus: Nephrolepis
- Species: N. brownii

Binomial name
- Nephrolepis brownii (Desv.) Hovenkamp & Miyam.

Synonyms
- Nephrolepis multiflora (Roxb.) F.M.Jarrett ex C.V.Morton

= Nephrolepis brownii =

Species of plant

Nephrolepis brownii, the Asian sword fern, is a species of fern native to Asia and introduced elsewhere. It is a perennial herb and grows up to 3 ft (0.91 m) tall.

== Range ==
The native range includes most of southeast Asia and extends north to China and Japan, west to Sri Lanka and India, east to Pacific islands, and south to Australia. It is introduced in North and South America and Hawaii.
