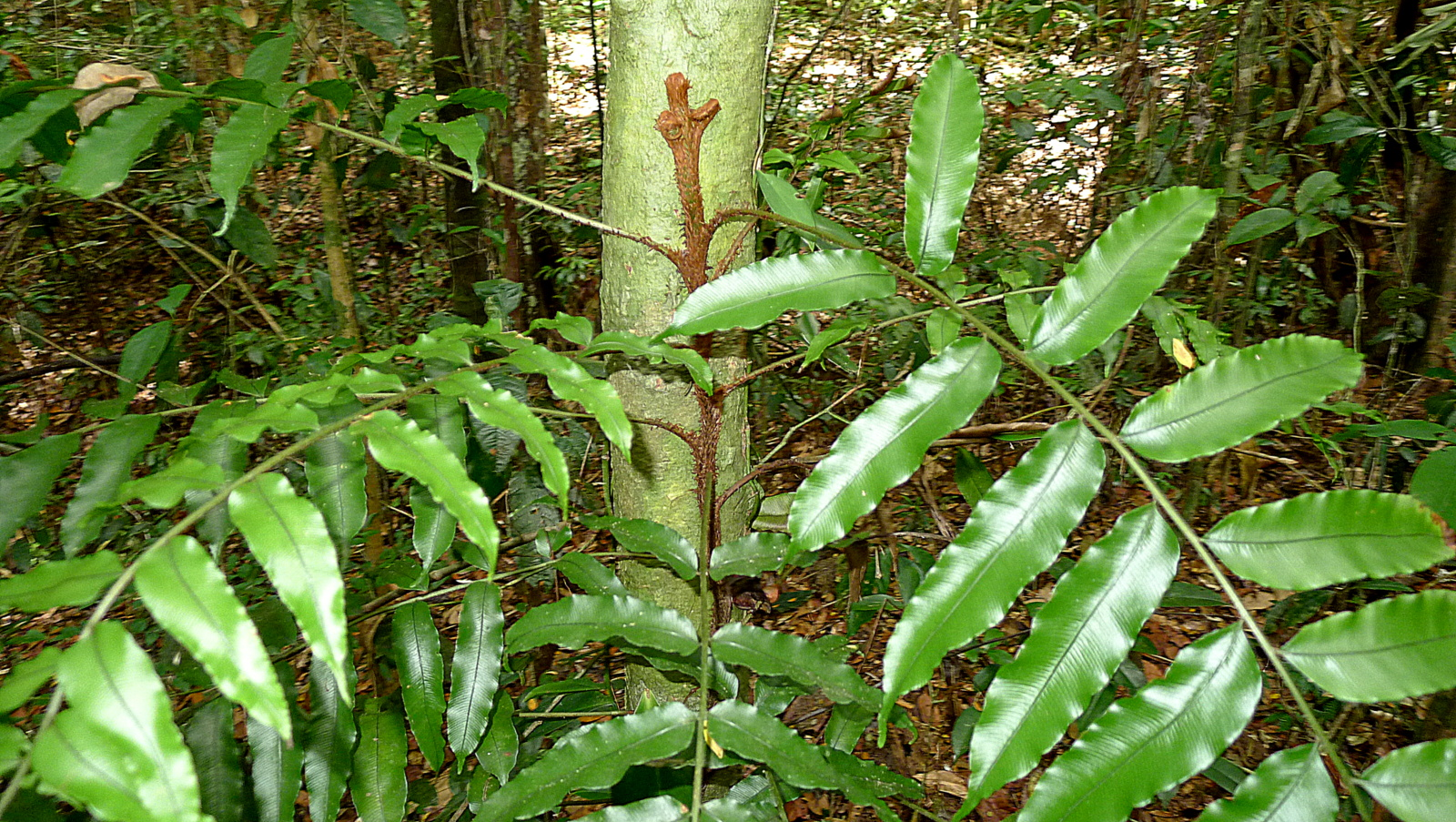
- Lomariopsis marginata

Scientific classification
- Kingdom: Plantae
- Clade: Tracheophytes
- Division: Polypodiophyta
- Class: Polypodiopsida
- Order: Polypodiales
- Suborder: Polypodiineae
- Family: Lomariopsidaceae
- Genus: Lomariopsis; Fée

Type species
- Lomariopsis sorbifolia (von Linné) Fée

Species
- See text

Synonyms
- Thysanosoria A.Gepp

= Lomariopsis =

Genus of ferns

Lomariopsis is the type genus of the fern family Lomariopsidaceae.

One economically important species exists via the freshwater aquarium plant trade, having only just been introduced in 2001 as an aquatic gametophyte form; most commonly known as "süsswassertang" (German for "freshwater seaweed"), this plant was initially believed to be some sort of liverwort. However, it is closely allied to Lomariopsis lineata, but has not yet been named as a distinct species.

== Taxonomy ==
=== Phylogeny ===
External phylogeny

- Polypodiineae (eupolypods I)
  - Didymochlaenaceae
  - - Hypodematiaceae
    - - Dryopteridaceae
      - - - Nephrolepidaceae
          - Lomariopsidaceae
        - - Tectariaceae
          - - Oleandraceae
            - - Davalliaceae
              - Polypodiaceae

Internal phylogeny

- Lomariopsis
  - L. oleandrifolia Mett. ex Kuhn
  - - - - L. marginata (Schrad.) Kuhn
        - L. maxonii (Underw.) Holttum
      - - - L. guineensis (Underw.) Alston
          - L. palustris (Hook.) Mett.
        - - L. nigropaleata Holttum
          - - L. prieuriana Fée
            - - L. japurensis (Mart.) J.Sm.
              - L. latipinna Stolze
    - - - L. kunzeana (C.Presl ex Underw.) Holttum
        - - L. jamaicensis (Underw.) Holttum
          - - L. fendleri D.C.Eaton
            - - - L. vestita E.Fourn.
                - - L. amydrophlebia (Sloss. ex Maxon) Holttum
                  - L. wrightii Mett ex Eaton
              - - L. recurvata Fée
                - - L. salicifolia (Kunze) Lellinger
                  - L. sorbifolia (L.) Fée
      - - L. longicaudata (Bonap.) Holttum
        - - - L. cordata (Bonap.) Alston
            - L. pollicina (Willemet) Mett. ex Kuhn
          - - - - L. spectabilis (Kunze) Mett.
                - - L. lineata (C.Presl) Holttum
                  - L. longini Kuo & Wu
              - - L. moorei Kuo & Wu
                - - L. novae-caledoniae Mett.
                  - - L. kingii (Copel.) Holttum
                    - - L. brackenridgei Carruth.
                      - L. leptocarpa Holttum non Fée
            - - L. boninensis Nakai
              - - - L. pervillei Mett. ex Kuhn
                  - - L. crassifolia Holttum
                    - - L. boivinii Holttum
                      - L. madagascarica (Bonap.) Alston
                - - L. rossii Holttum
                  - - L. hederacea Alston
                    - - L. mannii (Underw.) Alston
                      - L. muriculata Holttum

=== Species ===
As of February 2020, the Checklist of Ferns and Lycophytes of the World recognized the following species:

- Lomariopsis amydrophlebia (Sloss. ex Maxon) Holttum
- Lomariopsis boivinii Holttum
- Lomariopsis boninensis Nakai
- Lomariopsis brackenridgei Carruth.
- Lomariopsis chinensis Ching
- Lomariopsis christensenii Rakotondr.
- Lomariopsis commersonii Rakotondr.
- Lomariopsis congoensis Holttum
- Lomariopsis cordata (Bonap.) Alston
- Lomariopsis crassifolia Holttum
- Lomariopsis decrescens (Baker) Kuhn
- Lomariopsis × farrarii R.C.Moran & J.E.Watkins
- Lomariopsis fendleri D.C.Eaton
- Lomariopsis guineensis (Underw.) Alston
- Lomariopsis hederacea Alston
- Lomariopsis holttumii Rakotondr.
- Lomariopsis intermedia (Copel.) Holttum
- Lomariopsis jamaicensis (Underw.) Holttum
- Lomariopsis japurensis (Mart.) J.Sm.
- Lomariopsis kingii (Copel.) Holttum
- Lomariopsis kunzeana (C.Presl ex Underw.) Holttum
- Lomariopsis latipinna Stolze
- Lomariopsis lineata (C.Presl) Holttum
- Lomariopsis longicaudata (Bonap.) Holttum
- Lomariopsis madagascarica (Bonap.) Alston
- Lomariopsis mannii (Underw.) Alston
- Lomariopsis marginata (Schrad.) Kuhn
- Lomariopsis mauritiensis Lorence
- Lomariopsis maxonii (Underw.) Holttum
- Lomariopsis mexicana Holttum
- Lomariopsis muriculata Holttum
- Lomariopsis nigropaleata Holttum
- Lomariopsis novae-caledoniae Mett.
- Lomariopsis oleandrifolia Mett. ex Kuhn
- Lomariopsis palustris (Hook.) Mett.
- Lomariopsis pervillei Mett. ex Kuhn
- Lomariopsis pollicina (Willemet) Mett. ex Kuhn
- Lomariopsis prieuriana Fée
- Lomariopsis pteridiformis (Ces.) Christenh.
- Lomariopsis recurvata Fée
- Lomariopsis rossii Holttum
- Lomariopsis salicifolia (Kunze) Lellinger
- Lomariopsis sorbifolia (L.) Fée
- Lomariopsis spectabilis (Kunze) Mett.
- Lomariopsis subtrifoliata (Copel.) Holttum
- Lomariopsis tenuifolia (Desv.) Christ
- Lomariopsis underwoodii Holttum
- Lomariopsis variabilis (Willd.) Fée
- Lomariopsis vestita E.Fourn.
- Lomariopsis warneckei (Hieron.) Alston
- Lomariopsis wrightii Mett ex Eaton

Other species include:

- †Lomariopsis bertrandii (Brongniart) von Ettingshausen
- †Lomariopsis bilinica von Ettingshausen
