= Cyclopeltis =

Scientific classification
- Kingdom: Plantae
- Clade: Tracheophytes
- Division: Polypodiophyta
- Class: Polypodiopsida
- Order: Polypodiales
- Suborder: Polypodiineae
- Family: Lomariopsidaceae
- Genus: Cyclopeltis; J.Sm.

Type species
- Cyclopeltis semicordata (Swartz) Smith

Species
- See text

Synonyms
- Hemicardion Fée 1852

Genus of ferns

Cyclopeltis is a genus of ferns in the family Lomariopsidaceae according to the Pteridophyte Phylogeny Group classification of 2016 (PPG I).

== Taxonomy ==
Cyclopeltis was first described by John Smith in 1846.

== Phylogeny ==
As of February 2020, the Checklist of Ferns and Lycophytes of the World and Plants of the World Online recognized the following species:

Internal phylogeny

- Cyclopeltis
  - C. crenata (Fée) C.Chr.
  - - C. novoguineensis Rosenst.
    - C. semicordata (Sw.) J.Sm.

Other species include:
- Cyclopeltis jani Barthel
- Cyclopeltis kingii (Hance) Hosok.
- Cyclopeltis mirabilis Copel.
- Cyclopeltis presliana (J.Sm.) Berk.
- Cyclopeltis rigida Holttum
