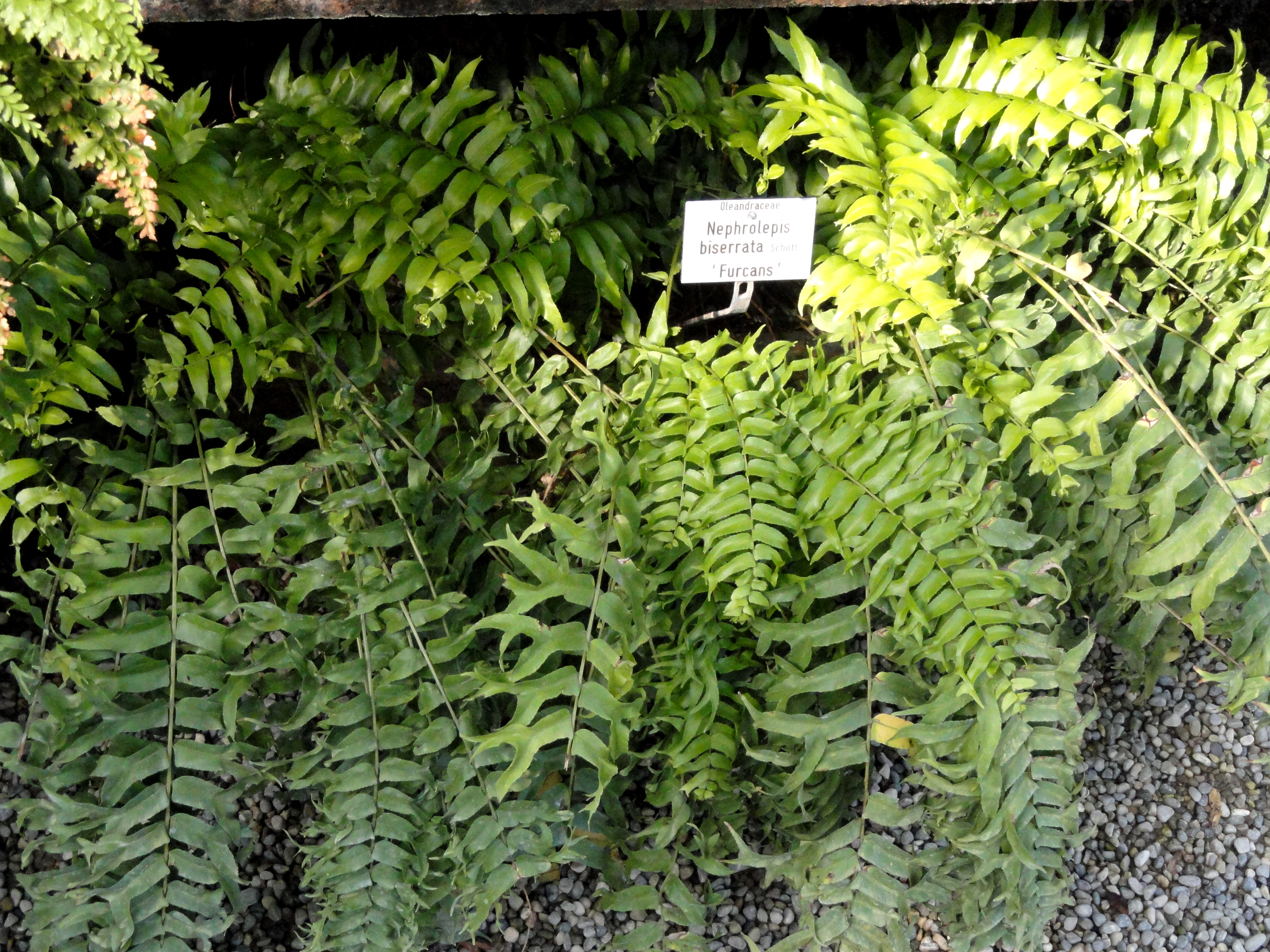

Conservation status
- Secure (NatureServe)

Scientific classification
- Kingdom: Plantae
- Clade: Tracheophytes
- Division: Polypodiophyta
- Class: Polypodiopsida
- Order: Polypodiales
- Suborder: Polypodiineae
- Family: Nephrolepidaceae
- Genus: Nephrolepis
- Species: N. biserrata

Binomial name
- Nephrolepis biserrata (Sw.) Schott

= Nephrolepis biserrata =

Species of fern

Nephrolepis biserrata (giant swordfern, 长叶肾蕨) is a tropical fern, native to Florida, Mexico, the West Indies, Central America, South America, Africa, and southeast Asia.

Its stipes are grayish brown and 10–50 cm × about 4 mm in size, with brownish-green, papery lamina that are 14–30 cm wide × 0.7–2 m in length, but has occasionally attained a length of twenty-seven feet (eight meters). This is the largest of all the sword ferns and it often is labeled Macho Fern at nurseries. after its aggressive growth nature when compared to ferns such as the Boston Sword Fern, Nephrolepis exaltata that is planted more commonly.

N. biserrata is known as asaha or likekele in the Democratic Republic of the Congo where young leaves are cooked and eaten as a condiment or leafy vegetable.

== Synonyms ==
- Aspidium acuminatum Willd.
- Aspidium acutum Schkuhr
- Aspidium biserratum Sw.
- Aspidium ensifolium Schkuhr
- Aspidium guineense Schumach.
- Aspidium punctulatum Sw.
- Hypopeltis biserrata (Sw.) Bory
- Lepidoneuron biserratum (Sw.) Fée
- Lepidoneuron punctulatum (Poir.) Fée
- Lepidoneuron rufescens (Schrad.) Fée
- Nephrodium acuminatum (Willd.) C. Presl
- Nephrodium acutum (Schkuhr) C. Presl
- Nephrodium biserratum (Sw.) C. Presl
- Nephrodium punctulatum (Sw.) Desv.
- Nephrodium rufescens Schrad.
- Nephrolepis acuminata (Willd.) C. Presl
- Nephrolepis acuta (Schkuhr) C. Presl
- Nephrolepis biserrata var. biserrata
- Nephrolepis biserrata subsp. punctulata (Poir.) Bonap.
- Nephrolepis ensifolia (Schkuhr) C. Presl
- Nephrolepis exaltata var. biserrata (Sw.) Baker
- Nephrolepis hirsutula var. acuta (Schkuhr) Kuntze
- Nephrolepis hirsutula var. biserrata (Sw.) Kuntze
- Nephrolepis mollis Rosenst.
- Nephrolepis punctulata (Poir.) C. Presl
- Nephrolepis rufescens (Schrad.) C. Presl ex Wawra
- Polypodium neprolepioides Christ
- Polypodium punctulatum Poir.
- Tectaria fraxinea Cav.
