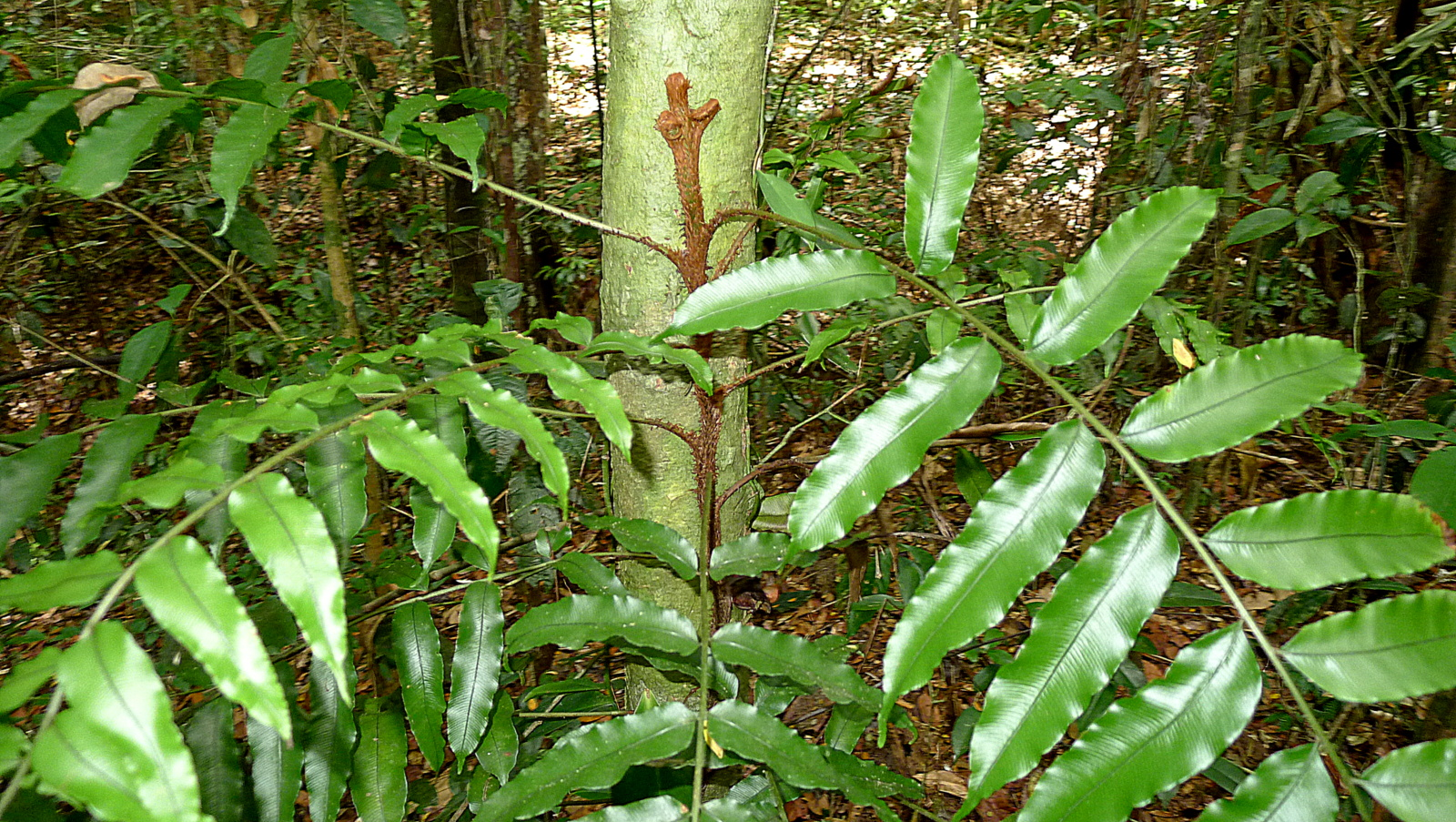
- Lomariopsis marginata

Scientific classification
- Kingdom: Plantae
- Clade: Tracheophytes
- Division: Polypodiophyta
- Class: Polypodiopsida
- Order: Polypodiales
- Suborder: Polypodiineae
- Family: Lomariopsidaceae; Alston

Genera
- Cyclopeltis; Dracoglossum; Dryopolystichum; Lomariopsis

Synonyms
- Lomariopsideae Pichi-Sermolli 1969; Lomariopsidoideae (Alston 1956) Crabbe, Jermy & Mickel 1975

= Lomariopsidaceae =

Family of ferns

The Lomariopsidaceae is a family of ferns with a largely tropical distribution. In the Pteridophyte Phylogeny Group classification of 2016 (PPG I), the family is placed in the suborder Polypodiineae (eupolypods I) of the order Polypodiales. Alternatively, it may be treated as the subfamily Lomariopsidoideae of a very broadly defined family Polypodiaceae sensu lato.

== Genera ==
The Pteridophyte Phylogeny Group classification of 2016 (PPG I) included four genera. Dryopolystichum was added in 2017, and Thysanosoria is now included in Lomariopsis, so that four genera are recognized as of February 2020:

- Cyclopeltis J.Sm.
- Dracoglossum Christenh.
- Dryopolystichum Copel.
- Lomariopsis Fée (including Thysanosoria)

The genus Nephrolepis has also been placed in this family, but it is now placed in its own family, Nephrolepidaceae.

Some members of the Lomariopsidaceae are cultivated as ornamental plants.

== Phylogeny ==
External phylogeny from PPG I 2016

- Polypodiineae (eupolypods I)
  - Didymochlaenaceae
  - - Hypodematiaceae
    - - Dryopteridaceae
      - - - Nephrolepidaceae
          - Lomariopsidaceae
        - - Tectariaceae
          - - Oleandraceae
            - - Davalliaceae
              - Polypodiaceae

Internal phylogeny from Fern Tree of Life

- Lomariopsidaceae
  - - Dryopolystichum
    - Cyclopeltis
  - - Dracoglossum
    - Lomariopsis
