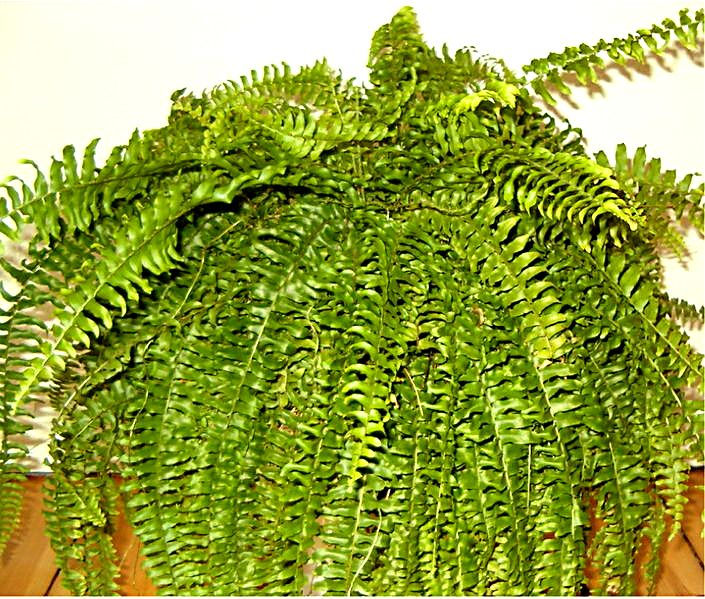
- Nephrolepis exaltata

Scientific classification
- Kingdom: Plantae
- Clade: Tracheophytes
- Division: Polypodiophyta
- Class: Polypodiopsida
- Order: Polypodiales
- Suborder: Polypodiineae
- Family: Nephrolepidaceae; Pic.Serm.
- Genus: Nephrolepis; Schott

Type species
- Nephrolepis exaltata (L.) Schott

Species
- See text

Synonyms
- Lepidoneuron Fée; Leptopleuria Presl; Lindsayoides Nakai

= Nephrolepis =

Genus of ferns

Nephrolepis is a genus of about 30 species of ferns. It is the only genus in the family Nephrolepidaceae, placed in the suborder Aspleniineae (eupolypods I) of the order Polypodiales in the Pteridophyte Phylogeny Group classification of 2016 (PPG I). (It is placed in the Dryopteridaceae in some other classifications.) Species in this genus include plants commonly referred to as Boston ferns. The fronds are long and narrow, and once-pinnate, in the case of one Bornean species reaching thirty feet (nine meters) in length.

== Phylogeny ==
The following cladogram for the suborder Polypodiineae (eupolypods I), based on the consensus cladogram in the Pteridophyte Phylogeny Group classification of 2016 (PPG I), shows a likely phylogenetic relationship between Nephrolepidaceae and the other families of the clade.

External phylogeny

- Polypodiineae (eupolypods I)
  - Didymochlaenaceae
  - - Hypodematiaceae
    - - Dryopteridaceae
      - - - Nephrolepidaceae
          - Lomariopsidaceae
        - - Tectariaceae
          - - Oleandraceae
            - - Davalliaceae
              - Polypodiaceae

Internal phylogeny

- Nephrolepis
  - - N. rivularis
    - - N. pectinata
      - N. pendula
  - - - N. lauterbachii
      - - N. undulata
        - - N. flexuosa
          - - N. cordifolia
            - N. exaltata
    - - N. davalliae
      - - N. abrupta
        - - - N. falcata
            - - N. radicans
              - - N. biserrata
                - N. falciformis
          - - - N. acutifolia
              - N. davallioides
            - - N. brownii
              - - N. hirsutula
                - N. obliterata

Other species include:
- N. arida Jones 1988
- N. ×averyi Nauman
- N. cocosensis Rojas 2017
- N. ×copelandii Wagner 1999
- N. delicatula (Decaisne) Pichi Sermolli
- N. dicksonioides Christ 1895
- N. duffii Moore
- N. equilatera Rojas
- †N. favosa Skuratenko 1968
- N. grayumiana Rojas
- N. ×hippocrepidis Miyam. 2005
- N. kurotawae Makino 1895
- N. ×medlerae Wagner 1999
- N. multiflora (Roxburgh) Jarrett ex Morton
- N. obtusiloba A. Rojas
- N. occidentalis Kunze
- †N. penduliformis Skuratenko 1968
- N. pickelii Rosenstock ex Sampaio 1930
- N. ×pseudobiserrata Miyam. 2005
- †N. sibirica Skuratenko 1968
- N. tuberosa (Bory ex Willdenow) Presl

== Selected species ==
- Nephrolepis biserrata (Sw.) Schott. (syn. Aspidium bisseratum Sw., Aspidium acutum Schkuhr, Nephrolepis acuta (Schkuhr) C. Presl, Polypodium puctulatum Poir)
- Nephrolepis cordifolia (L.) C. Presl (syn. Polypodium cordifolium L., Nephrolepis tuberosa (Bory ex Willd.) C. Presl, Aspidium tuberosum Bory ex Willd.)
- Nephrolepis exaltata (L.) Schott (syn. Polypodium exaltatum L.)
- Nephrolepis falcata
- Nephrolepis multiflora (Roxb.) F.M. Jarret ex C.V. Morton (syn. Davallia multiflora Roxb.)
- Nephrolepis obliterata
- Nephrolepis pectinata (Willd.) Schott (syn. Aspidium pectinatum Willd.)
- Nephrolepis tuberosa

Some species of Nephrolepis are grown as ornamental plants. Nephrolepis exaltata and Nephrolepis obliterata are reported to be good plants for cleaning indoor air.

Some Nephrolepis species may prove to be a good source of new antimicrobial chemicals.
