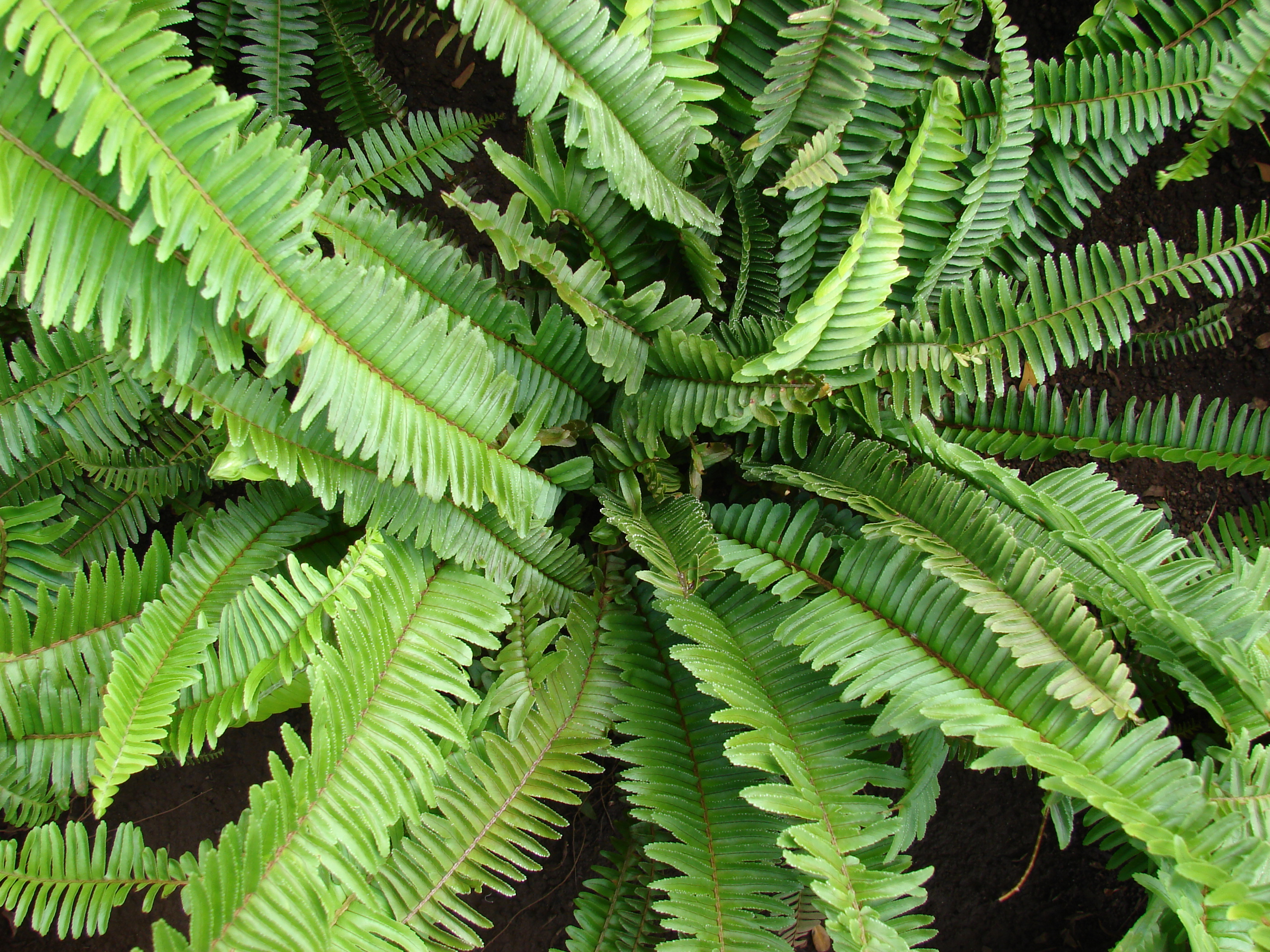

Scientific classification
- Kingdom: Plantae
- Clade: Tracheophytes
- Division: Polypodiophyta
- Class: Polypodiopsida
- Order: Polypodiales
- Suborder: Polypodiineae
- Family: Nephrolepidaceae
- Genus: Nephrolepis
- Species: N. cordifolia

Binomial name
- Nephrolepis cordifolia (L.) C.Presl

Synonyms
- 32 synonyms: For Nephrolepis cordifolia; Aspidium cordifolium (L.) Sw.; Nephrodium cordifolium (L.) Baker; Polypodium cordifolium L.; For var. cordifolia; Asplenium bulbosum Lour.; Aspidium auriculatum (L.) Sw.; Aspidium edule Spreng.; Aspidium imbricatum Kaulf. ex Spreng.; Aspidium riparium Bory ex Willd.; Aspidium sublanosum Wall.; Aspidium tuberosum Willd.; Aspidium volubile var. cavernicola (Domin) F.M.Bailey; Davallia falcata Sw.; Dryopteris auriculata (L.) Kuntze; Nephrodium auriculatum (L.) A.Rich.; Nephrodium edule D.Don; Nephrodium imbricatum (Kaulf. ex Spreng.) Bojer; Nephrodium tuberosum (Willd.) Desv.; Nephrolepis auriculata (L.) Trimen; Nephrolepis cordifolia var. aureoglandulosa (Bonap.) C.Chr.; Nephrolepis cordifolia f. aureoglandulosa Bonap.; Nephrolepis cordifolia var. tambourinensis Domin; Nephrolepis cordifolia var. tuberosa (Willd.) Baker; Nephrolepis exaltata var. tuberosa (Willd.) Kuntze; Nephrolepis imbricata (Kaulf.) C.Presl; Nephrolepis intramarginalis Kunze; Nephrolepis paleacea Jungh. & de Vriese; Nephrolepis radicans var. cavernicola Domin; Nephrolepis rhizodes Kunze; Nephrolepis tuberosa (Willd.) C.Presl; Polypodium auriculatum L.; Polystichum auriculatum (L.) C.Presl; For var. pumicicola; Nephrolepis pumicicola F.Ballard

= Nephrolepis cordifolia =

Species of fern

Nephrolepis cordifolia is a species of fern native to tropical and subtropical areas from India through Southeast Asia to Australia and the Pacific islands. It has been introduced to many other countries. It has many common names including fishbone fern, tuberous sword fern, tuber ladder fern, erect sword fern, narrow sword fern and ladder fern, and herringbone fern.

== Description ==
Nephrolepis cordifolia is an evergreen fern that grows to between 40 and 80 centimeters, in extreme cases up to 1 meter. It forms an underground rhizome in the form of several small tubers. The pinnate fronds are erect and pinnate linear to lanceolate, glandular and simple. The rachis bears bicolored chaff scales. The petiole is covered with bicolored pale and dark brown scales.

The leaflets are entire, sessile and elongate-lanceolate. They grow up to 4.8 centimeters long and up to 0.9 cm wide. They stand at a distance of less than 1 centimeter. The sori are rounded. The spores are warty, wrinkled.

== Distribution ==
It is native to the following regions as defined in the World Geographical Scheme for Recording Plant Distributions:

- West-Central Tropical Africa – Cameroon, Gulf of Guinea Islands
- Western Indian Ocean – Comoros, Mauritius, Réunion, Seychelles
- China – China South-Central, China Southeast, Hainan, Tibet
- Eastern Asia – Japan, Kazan-retto, Korea, Nansei-shoto, Ogasawara-shoto, Taiwan
- Indian Subcontinent – Assam, Bangladesh, East Himalaya, India, Laccadive Islands, Nepal, Sri Lanka, West Himalaya
- Indo-China – Cambodia, Laos, Myanmar, South China Sea, Thailand, Vietnam
- Malesia – Borneo, Jawa, Lesser Sunda Islands, Malaya, Philippines, Sulawesi
- Australia – New South Wales, Norfolk Island, Queensland
- Southwestern Pacific – Fiji, New Caledonia, Vanuatu
- South-Central Pacific – Marquesas, Pitcairn Island, Society Islands, Tubuai Islands
- Northwestern Pacific – Caroline Islands
- North-Central Pacific – Hawaii

It has been introduced into the following regions:

- East Tropical Africa – Kenya, Tanzania
- Macaronesia – Azores, Madeira
- Southern Africa – Cape Provinces, KwaZulu-Natal, Northern Provinces, Swaziland
- Indian Subcontinent – Pakistan
- Indo-China – Thailand
- New Zealand – New Zealand North, New Zealand South
- Southeastern Europe – Italy
- Southwestern Europe – France, Spain
- Mexico – Mexico Central, Mexico Gulf, Mexico Southeast, Mexico Southwest
- Southeastern U.S.A. – Alabama, Florida, Georgia
- Southwestern U.S.A. – California
- Brazil – Brazil Northeast, Brazil South, Brazil Southeast
- Caribbean – Cuba, Dominican Republic, Haiti, Jamaica, Leeward Is., Puerto Rico, Windward Is.
- Central America – Belize, El Salvador, Guatemala, Honduras, Nicaragua, Panamá
- Northern South America – French Guiana, Guyana, Suriname
- Southern South America – Argentina Northeast, Argentina Northwest, Paraguay
- Western South America – Bolivia, Colombia, Ecuador, Galápagos, Peru

== Habitat ==
They can establish themselves terrestrially, or as an epiphyte or lithophyte, provided that the location has ideal moisture and light levels. In adequate conditions, these ferns grow readily as epiphytes, typically adhering to the bark of tree branches above a water source, where they can receive round-the-clock humidity and airflow. They can be found in a multitude of environments, from deep swamps and riverbanks to rugged outcrops and rock faces, as well as roadsides, ditches, creeks, fallen trees, and even abandoned buildings and ruins. They love moist, shady locations; in their natural range, they are usually found in swamps (as an epiphyte) or along brooks and ditches of coniferous forest floodplains (growing more terrestrially).

== Varieties ==
Three varieties are recognised as of September 2026:

- Nephrolepis cordifolia var. cordifolia – western Indian Ocean (except Madagascar) to tropical and subtropical Asia, eastern Australia, and the Pacific
- Nephrolepis cordifolia var. pseudolauterbachii Hovenkamp & Miyam. – Fiji
- Nephrolepis cordifolia var. pumicicola (F.Ballard) Hovenkamp & Miyam. – São Tomé and southwestern Cameroon

== Invasive species ==
Nephrolepis cordifolia has become an invasive species is some areas where it has been introduced. In New Zealand it is listed on the National Pest Plant Accord, which prohibits the sale, cultivation and distribution of the plant. It is listed as an invasive species in Florida, United States.

== Gallery ==
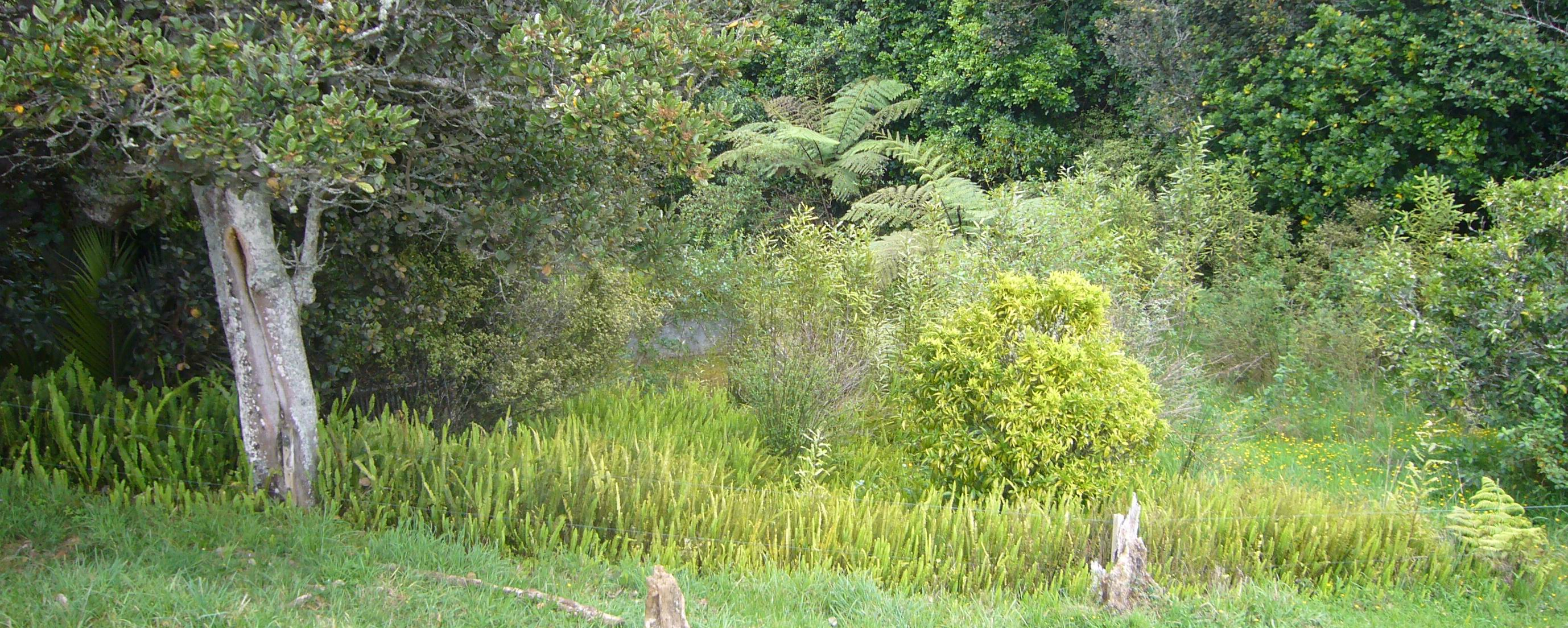
Nephrolepis cordifolia spreading on a forest and pasture margin in the Waikato region in New Zealand

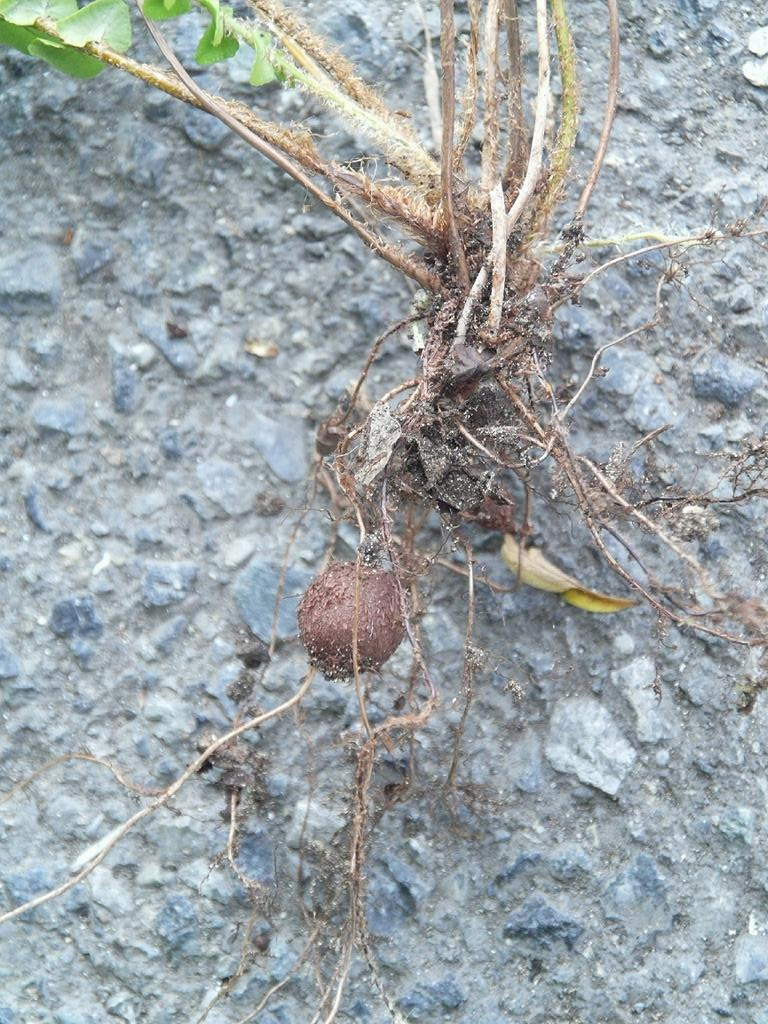
Nephrolepis cordifolia root system showing a tuber

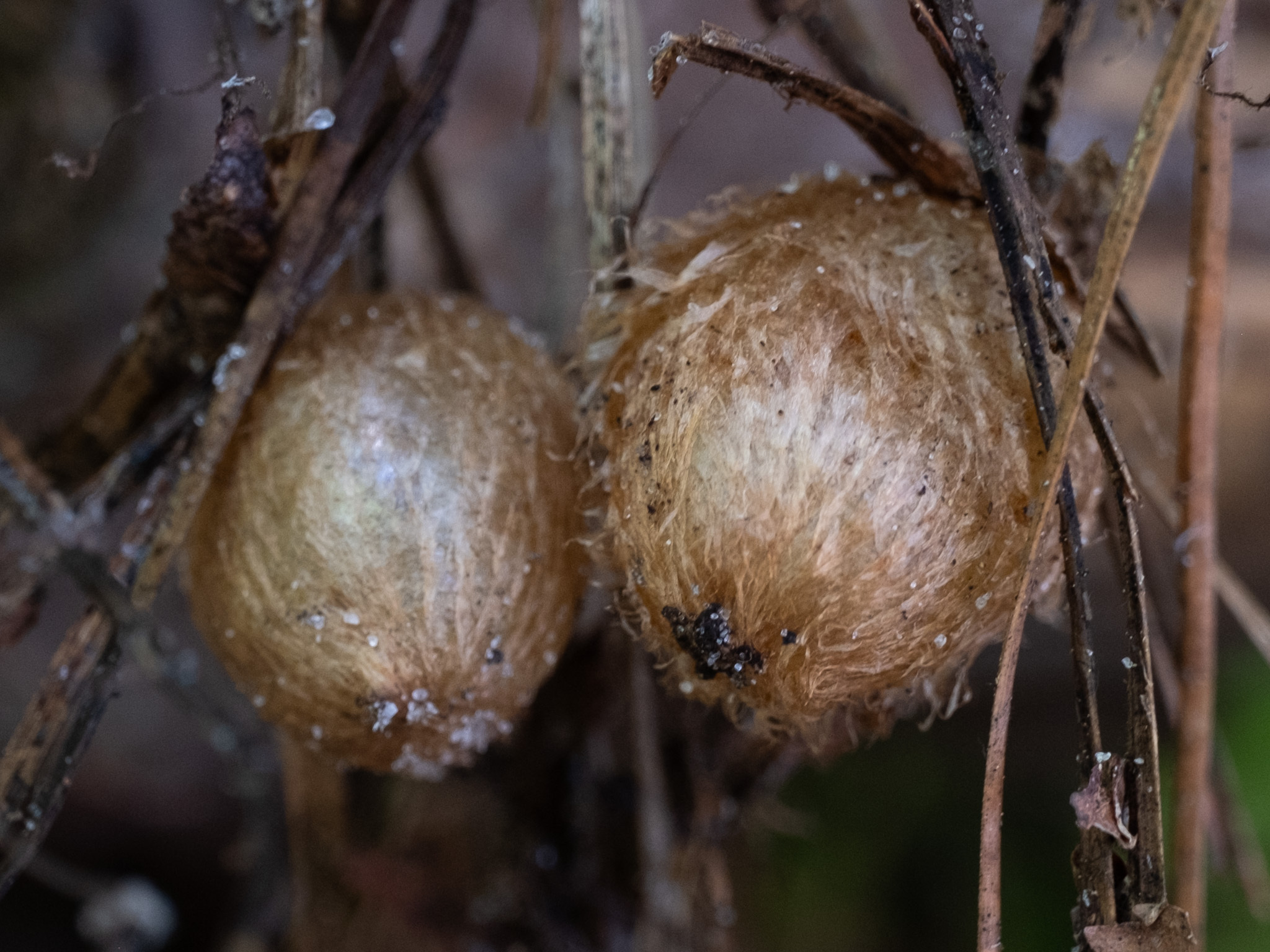
Tubers close up

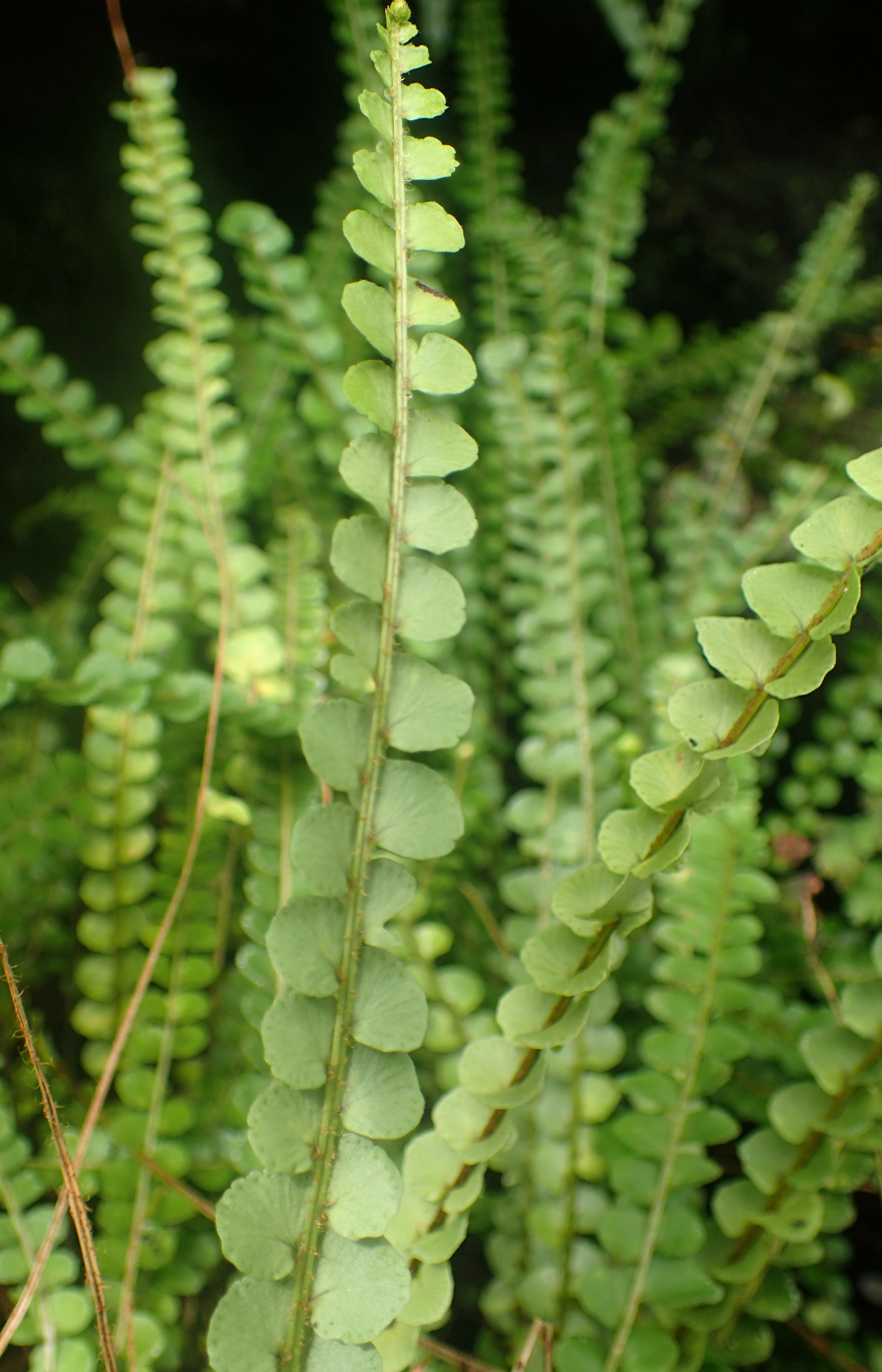
Nephrolepis cordifolia 'Duffii' at Garfield Park Conservatory

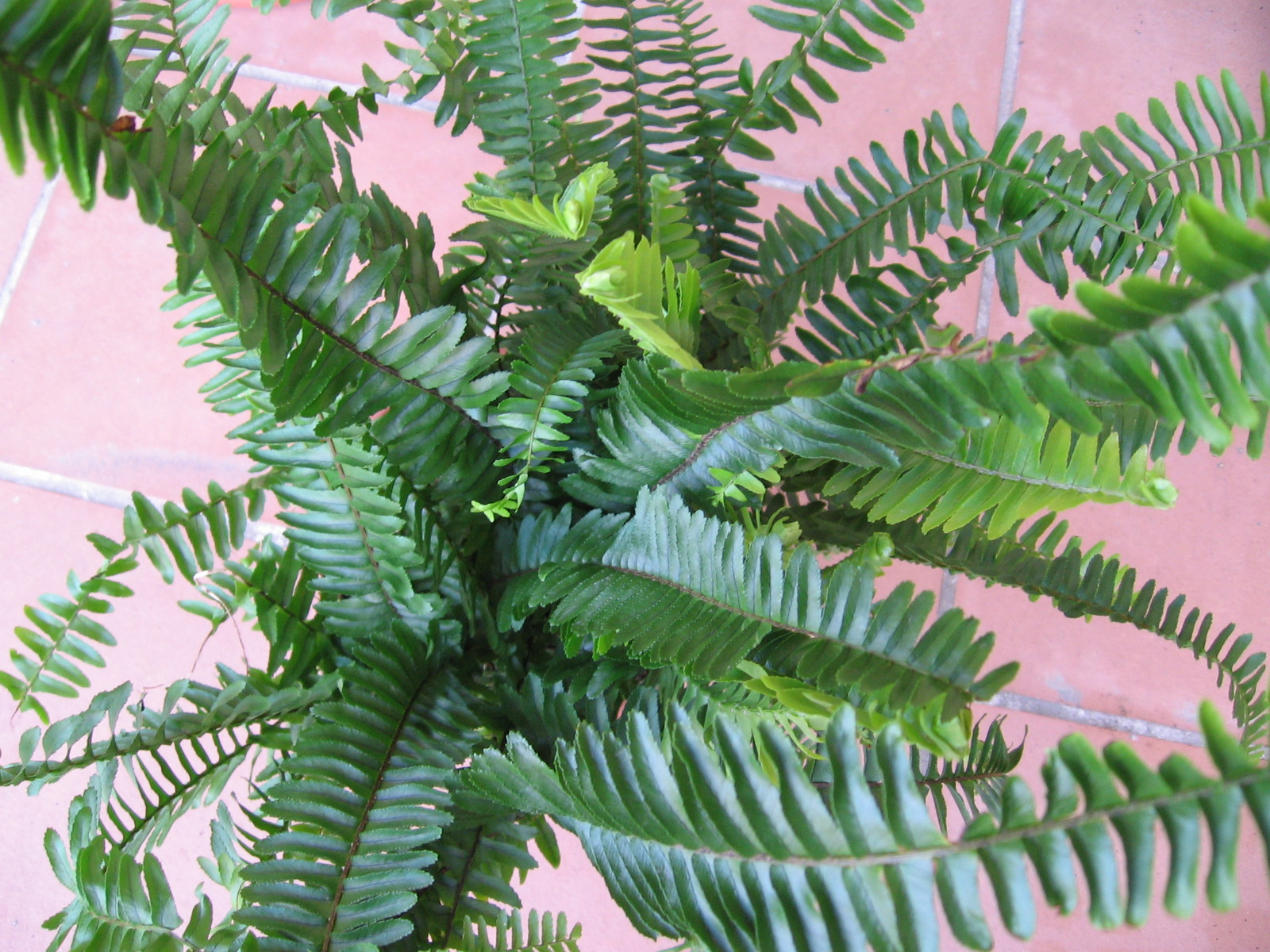
Pot plant

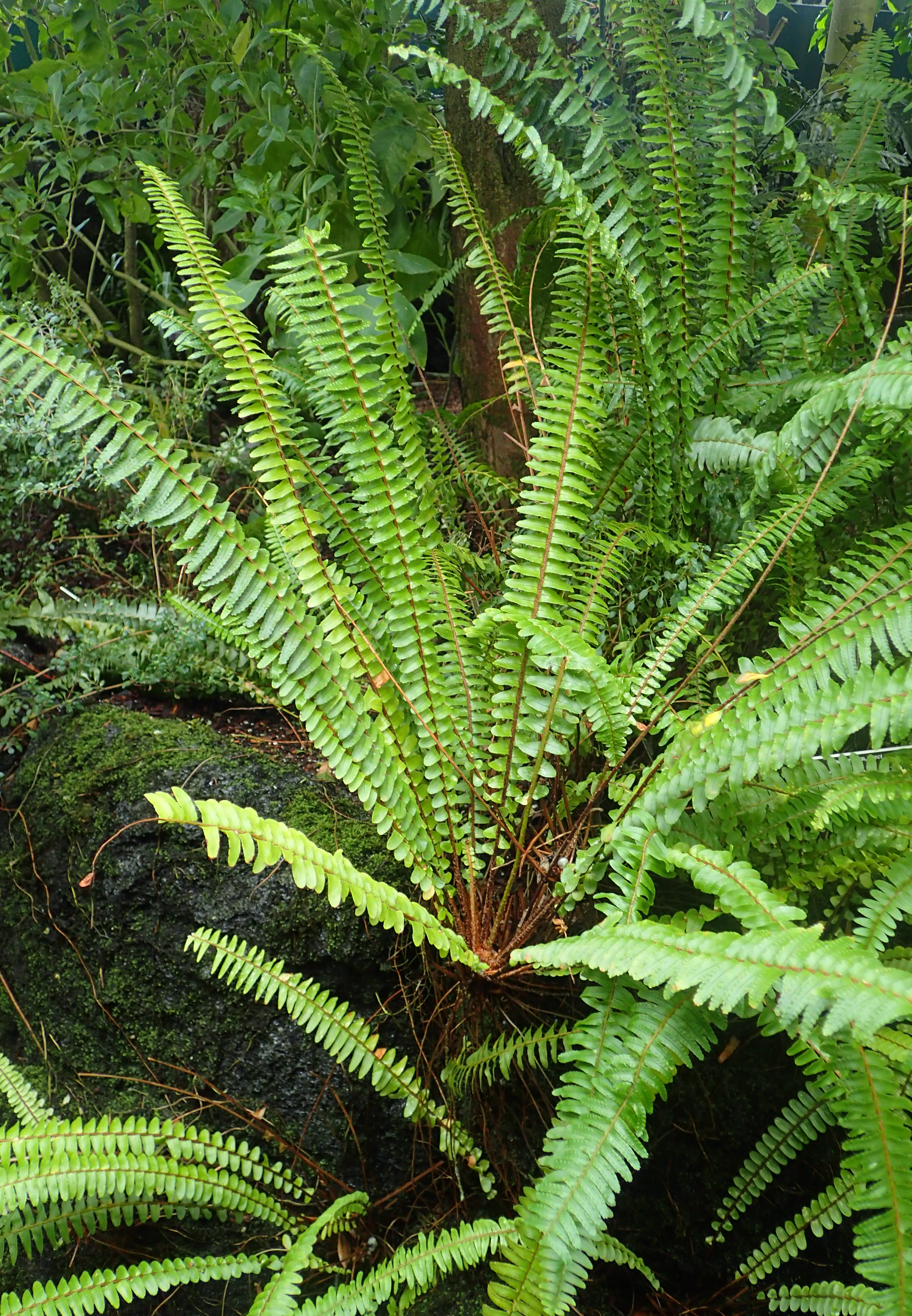
Nephrolepis cordifolia at the New York Botanical Garden

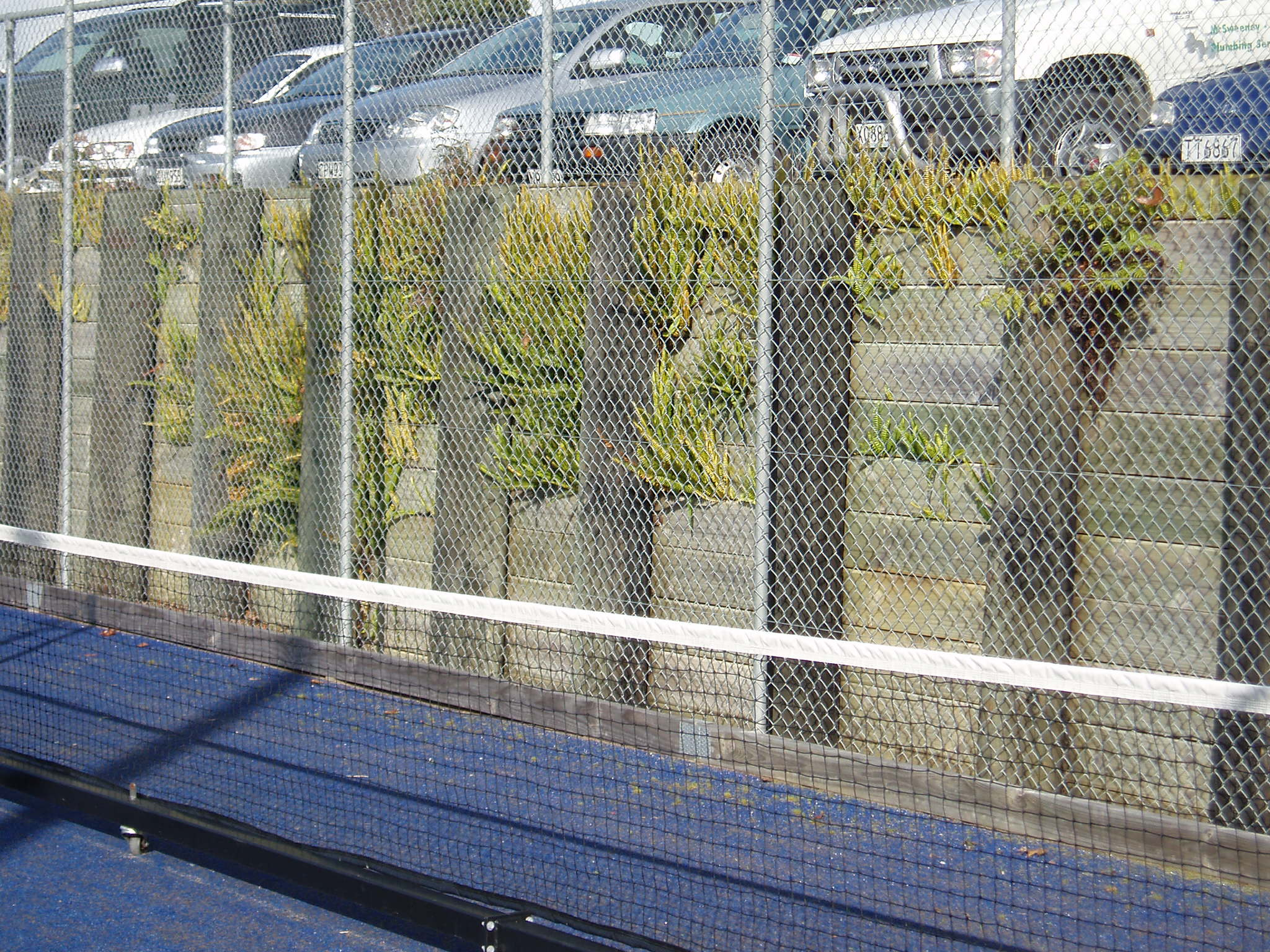
Growing down on a planked wall

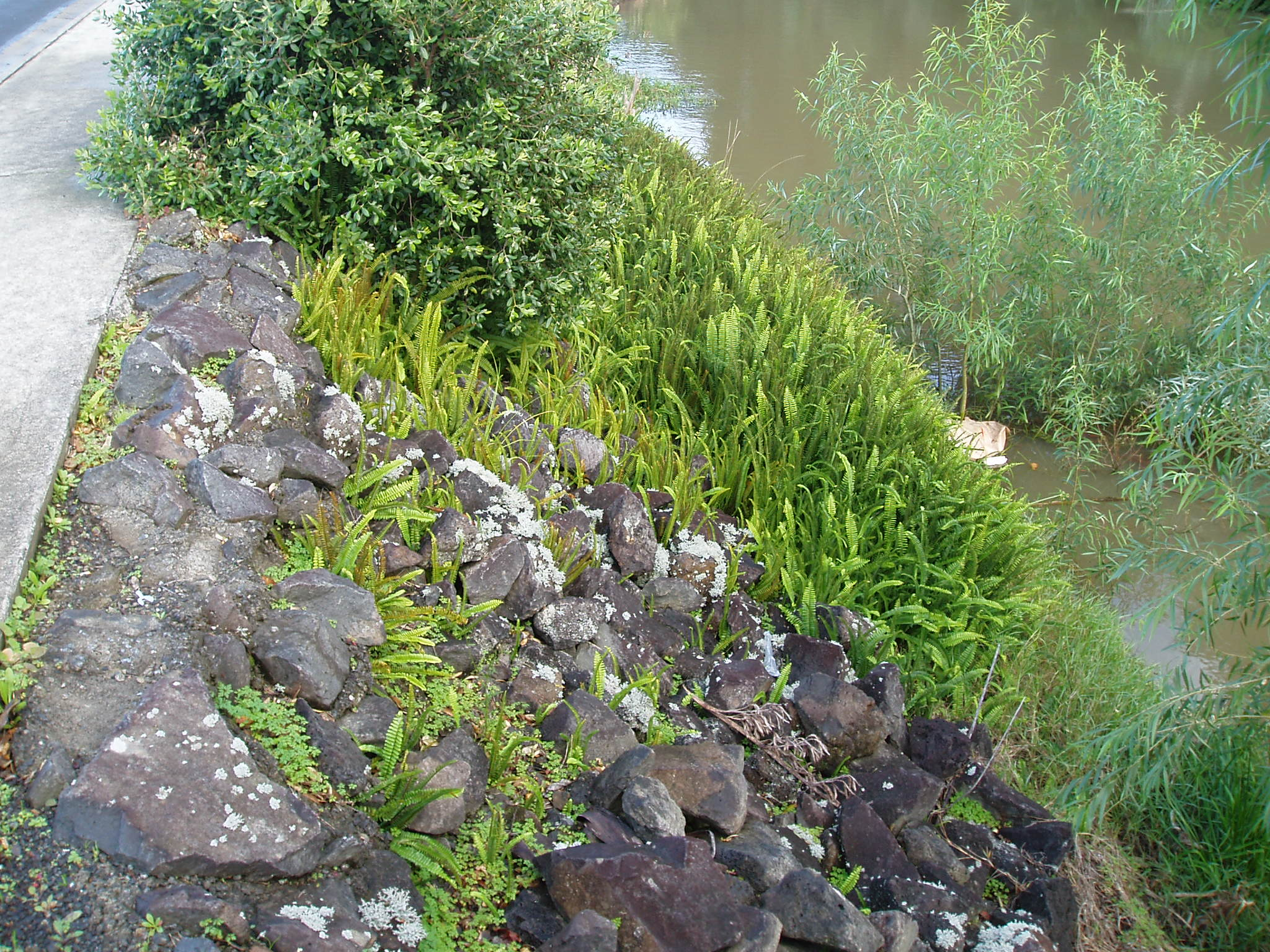
Growing between rocks
