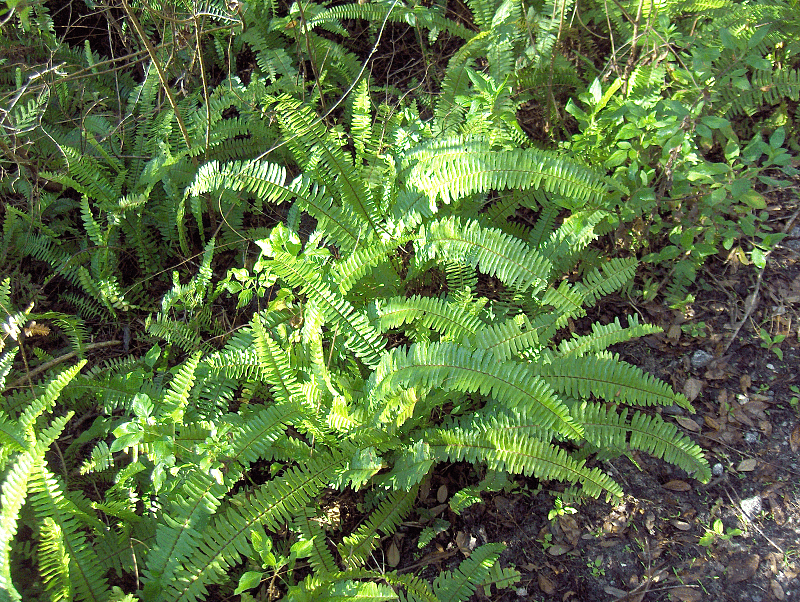

Conservation status
- Least Concern (IUCN 3.1)

- Secure (NatureServe)

Scientific classification
- Kingdom: Plantae
- Clade: Tracheophytes
- Division: Polypodiophyta
- Class: Polypodiopsida
- Order: Polypodiales
- Suborder: Polypodiineae
- Family: Nephrolepidaceae
- Genus: Nephrolepis
- Species: N. exaltata

Binomial name
- Nephrolepis exaltata (L.) Schott

Subspecies
- Nephrolepis exaltata subsp. exaltata; Nephrolepis exaltata subsp. hawaiiensis W.H.Wagner

Synonyms
- Aspidium exaltatum (L.) Sw.; Hypopeltis exaltata (L.) Bory; Nephrodium exaltatum (L.) R.Br.; Polypodium exaltatum L.

= Nephrolepis exaltata =

Species of fern

Nephrolepis exaltata, known as the sword fern or Boston fern, is a species of fern in the family Nephrolepidaceae. It is native to the Americas. This evergreen plant can reach as high as 40–90 centimetres (16–35 in), and in extreme cases up to 1.5 metres (4 ft 11 in). It is also known as the Boston sword fern, wild Boston fern, Boston blue bell fern, tuber ladder fern, or fishbone fern.

== Description ==
The fronds of Nephrolepis exaltata are 50–250 centimetres (20–98 in) long and 6–15 centimetres (2.4–5.9 in) broad, with alternate pinnae (the small "leaflets" on either side of the midrib), each pinna being 2–8 centimetres (0.79–3.15 in) long. The pinnae are generally deltoid, as seen in the adjacent picture. The pinnate vein pattern is also visible on these highly compound leaves. The edges appear slightly serrate, linear to lanceolate and glandular. The rachis bears monochrome sprout soups. The leaflets are entire, undestroyed and oblong-lanceolate up to 4.8 inches (120 mm) long and up to 0.9 inches (23 mm) wide. They stand at a distance of less than 1 centimetre (0.39 in). The sori are rounded. The spores are warty and wrinkled. Nephrolepis exaltata forms an underground rhizome that is slim and tuberous.

The species has erect fronds, but Nephrolepis exaltata 'Bostoniensis' (Boston fern) and 'Teddy Junior' have gracefully arching fronds. This mutation was discovered in a shipment of N. exaltata to Boston from Philadelphia in 1894. Other proposals for the origin of the term Boston fern were documented by David Fairchild, who stated that the term came from Florida pioneer nurseryman John Soar, who sent the plants to his friend in Boston.

== Range ==
The fern is common in humid forests and swamps, especially in northern South America, Mexico, Central America, Florida, the West Indies, Polynesia and Africa. N. exaltata thrives in moist, shady locations and is found frequently in swamps and floodplains. The plant can grow both terrestrially and as an epiphyte. It grows epiphytically on the Sabal palmetto.

== Subspecies ==
Two subspecies are accepted:

- Nephrolepis exaltata subsp. exaltata – subtropical and tropical Americas
- Nephrolepis exaltata subsp. hawaiiensis W.H.Wagner – Hawaiian Islands

== Cultivation and uses ==
Nephrolepis exaltata is a very popular house plant, often grown in hanging baskets or similar conditions. It is a perennial plant hardy in USDA plant hardiness zones 9–11. Although the fern may appear totally dead during periods of frost, it will re-emerge in the spring. In general, the Boston fern thrives in damp, but not soggy, soil that is rich in nutrients. Of the common cultivated ferns, the Boston fern is the most tolerant to drought. The fern is acclimated to humid conditions, so when grown as a house plant, it is necessary to mist the plant when relative humidity falls below around 80%. Although the plant prefers partial shade or full shade outdoors, it doesn't grow in shade when indoors and responds best to bright filtered light. The plant is usually propagated by division of the rooted runners, as named cultivars will not produce true spores. It is safe for pets as it is known to be non-toxic.

=== Cultivars ===
A number of cultivars exist:

- 'Teddy Junior'
- 'Bostoniensis'
- 'Sonata'
- 'Montana'
- 'Green Lady'
- 'Marissa' (a dwarf variety)
- 'Todeoides'
- 'Whitmanii Improved'
- 'Rooseveltii'

The following are recipients of the Royal Horticultural Society's Award of Garden Merit:

- Nephrolepis exaltata
- Nephrolepis exaltata 'Bostoniensis'
- Nephrolepis exaltata 'Elegantissima'

== Invasive species ==
A related species, Nephrolepis cordifolia (Tuberous sword fern), is frequently confused with this sword fern, and is a serious exotic invasive plant, forming dense monocultures. Nephrolepis exaltata is classified as an invasive alien plant in South Africa. In some provinces it must be eradicated by law. In others, a permit is required to import, possess, grow, breed, move, sell, buy or accept one as a gift.
