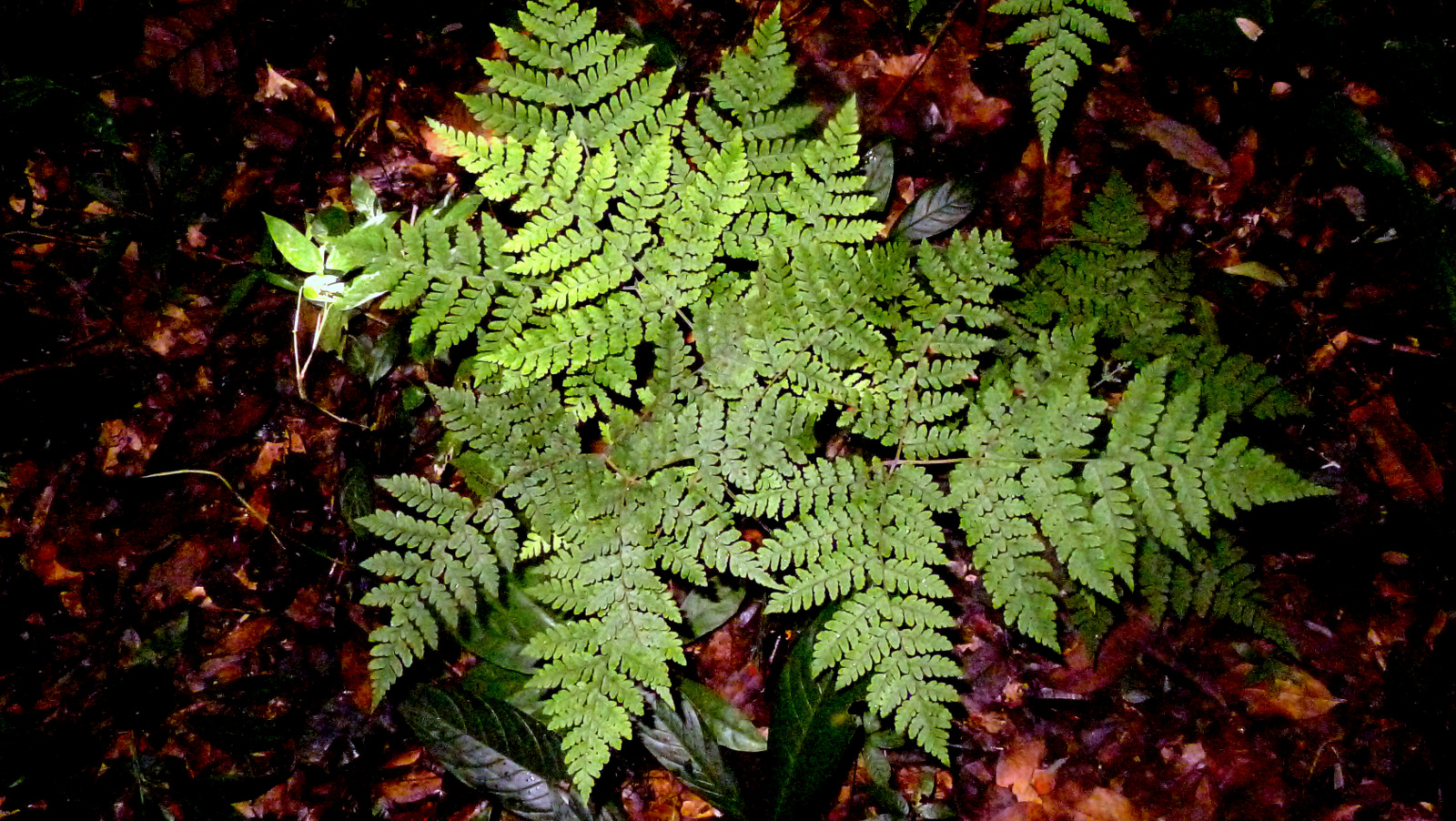
- Triplophyllum hirsutum in the state of Bahia, Brazil

Scientific classification
- Kingdom: Plantae
- Clade: Tracheophytes
- Division: Polypodiophyta
- Class: Polypodiopsida
- Order: Polypodiales
- Suborder: Polypodiineae
- Family: Tectariaceae
- Genus: Triplophyllum; Holttum

Species
- See text.

= Triplophyllum =

Genus of ferns

Triplophyllum is a genus of ferns in the family Tectariaceae, according to the Pteridophyte Phylogeny Group classification of 2016 (PPG I).

== Taxonomy ==
The genus Triplophyllum was erected by Richard Eric Holttum in 1986. The type species is Triplophyllum protensum, transferred from Aspidium protensum.

A 2016 molecular phylogenetic showed Triplophyllum to be in a clade containing Tectaria, sister to Hypoderris.

- Tectariaceae
  - - Pteridrys
    - - Malaifilix
      - Draconopteris
  - - Arthropteris
    - - Tectaria
      - - Hypoderris
        - Triplophyllum

=== Species ===
As of February 2020, the Checklist of Ferns and Lycophytes of the World recognized the following species:

- Triplophyllum angustifolium Holttum
- Triplophyllum attenuatum (Pic.Serm.) Pic.Serm.
- Triplophyllum batesii Holttum
- Triplophyllum boliviense J.Prado & R.C.Moran
- Triplophyllum buchholzii (Kuhn) Holttum
- Triplophyllum chocoense J.Prado & R.C.Moran
- Triplophyllum crassifolium Holttum
- Triplophyllum dicksonioides (Fée) Holttum
- Triplophyllum dimidiatum (Mett. ex Kuhn) Holttum
- Triplophyllum fraternum (Mett.) Holttum
- Triplophyllum funestum (Kunze) Holttum
- Triplophyllum gabonense Holttum
- Triplophyllum glabrum J.Prado & R.C.Moran
- Triplophyllum heudelotii Pic.Serm.
- Triplophyllum hirsutum (Holttum) J.Prado & R.C.Moran
- Triplophyllum jenseniae (C.Chr.) Holttum
- Triplophyllum pentagonum (Bonap.) Holttum
- Triplophyllum perpilosum (Holttum) J.Prado & R.C.Moran
- Triplophyllum pilosissimum (J.Sm. ex T.Moore) Holttum
- Triplophyllum principis Holttum
- Triplophyllum protensum (Afzel. ex Sw.) Holttum
- Triplophyllum subquinquefidum (P.Beauv.) Pic.Serm.
- Triplophyllum securidiforme (Hook.) Holttum
- Triplophyllum speciosum (Mett. ex Kuhn) Holttum
- Triplophyllum troupinii (Pic.Serm.) Holttum
- Triplophyllum varians (T.Moore) Holttum
- Triplophyllum vogelii (Hook.) Holttum
