= Pteridrys =

Scientific classification
- Kingdom: Plantae
- Clade: Tracheophytes
- Division: Polypodiophyta
- Class: Polypodiopsida
- Order: Polypodiales
- Suborder: Polypodiineae
- Family: Tectariaceae
- Genus: Pteridrys; C.Chr. & Ching

Species
- See text.

Genus of ferns

Pteridrys is a genus of ferns in the family Tectariaceae, according to the Pteridophyte Phylogeny Group classification of 2016 (PPG I).

== Taxonomy ==
The genus Pteridrys was erected by Carl Christensen and Ren-Chang Ching in 1934. The type species is Pteridrys syrmatica, transferred from Aspidium syrmaticum.

A 2016 molecular phylogenetic showed Pteridrys to be related to two new genera, Draconopteris and Malaifilix, separate from the clade containing Tectaria.

- Tectariaceae
  - - Pteridrys
    - - Malaifilix
      - Draconopteris
  - - Arthropteris
    - - Tectaria
      - - Hypoderris
        - Triplophyllum

=== Species ===
As of February 2020, the Checklist of Ferns and Lycophytes of the World recognized the following species:

- Pteridrys acutissima Ching ex C.Chr. & Ching
- Pteridrys australis Ching ex C.Chr. & Ching
- Pteridrys cnemidaria (Christ) C.Chr. et. Ching
- Pteridrys confertiloba Holttum
- Pteridrys costularis Li Bing Zhang, Liang Zhang, N.T.Lu & X.M.Zhou
- Pteridrys dongshiyongii Li Bing Zhang & X.M.Zhou
- Pteridrys dorsifixa Li Bing Zhang & X.M.Zhou
- Pteridrys hanoiensis Li Bing Zhang, Liang Zhang, N.T.Lu & X.M.Zhou
- Pteridrys lofouensis (Christ) C.Chr. & Ching
- Pteridrys microthecia (Fée) C.Chr. & Ching
- Pteridrys olivacea (Rosenst.) Copel.
- Pteridrys syrmatica (Willd.) C.Chr. & Ching
- Pteridrys vietnamensis Li Bing Zhang, Liang Zhang, N.T.Lu & X.M.Zhou
