= Malaifilix =

Scientific classification
- Kingdom: Plantae
- Clade: Tracheophytes
- Division: Polypodiophyta
- Class: Polypodiopsida
- Order: Polypodiales
- Suborder: Polypodiineae
- Family: Tectariaceae
- Genus: Malaifilix; Li Bing Zhang & Schuettp.
- Species: M. grandidentata

Binomial name
- Malaifilix grandidentata (Ces.) Li Bing Zhang & Schuettp.

Synonyms
- Dictyopteris carinata Alderw.; Draconopteris grandidentata (Ces) Christenh.; Pleopeltis grandidentata (Ces.) Alderw.; Polypodium dilatatum var. grandidentatum Ces.; Polypodium grandidentatum (Ces.) Baker; Tectaria carinata (Alderw.) C.Chr.; Tectaria grandidentata (Ces.) Holttum

Genus of ferns

Malaifilix is a genus of ferns in the family Tectariaceae, with a single species Malaifilix grandidentata, according to the Pteridophyte Phylogeny Group classification of 2016 (PPG I).

== Taxonomy ==
The genus Malaifilix was erected in 2016 for a species previously placed in Tectaria (Tectaria grandidentata). A 2016 molecular phylogenetic analysis of Tectariaceae had separated two new genera, Draconopteris and Malaifilix, from Tectaria sensu stricto. The analysis arranged the genera as in the following cladogram, where an alternative broader circumscription of Draconopteris has been added.

- Tectariaceae
  - - Pteridrys
    - Draconopteris s.l.
      - Malaifilix
      - Draconopteris s.s.
  - - - - Hypoderris
        - Triplophyllum
      - Tectaria
    - Arthropteris

Other sources do not recognize the genus Malaifilix, submerging its sole species into a more widely circumscribed Draconopteris.
