= Draconopteris =

Scientific classification
- Kingdom: Plantae
- Clade: Tracheophytes
- Division: Polypodiophyta
- Class: Polypodiopsida
- Order: Polypodiales
- Suborder: Polypodiineae
- Family: Tectariaceae
- Genus: Draconopteris; Li Bing Zhang & Liang Zhang
- Species: D. draconoptera

Binomial name
- Draconopteris draconoptera (D.C.Eaton) Li Bing Zhang & Liang Zhang

Synonyms
- Aspidium draconopterum D.C.Eaton; Aspidium myriosorum Christ; Dryomenis purdiei J.Sm.; Phegopteris draconopteron (D.C.Eaton) Mett.; Pleopeltis purdiei (J.Sm.) Moore; Polypodium draconopterum (D.C.Eaton) Hook.; Tectaria draconoptera (D.C.Eaton) Copel.; Tectaria myriosora (Christ) C.Chr.

Genus of ferns

Draconopteris is a genus of ferns in the family Tectariaceae, with a single species Draconopteris draconoptera, according to the Pteridophyte Phylogeny Group classification of 2016 (PPG I).

== Taxonomy ==
The genus Draconopteris was erected in 2016 by Li Bing Zhang and Liang Zhang for the species Aspidium draconopterum. A 2016 molecular phylogenetic analysis of Tectariaceae had separated two new genera, Draconopteris and Malaifilix, from Tectaria sensu stricto. The analysis arranged the genera as in the following cladogram, where an alternative broader circumscription has been added.

- Tectariaceae
  - - Pteridrys
    - Draconopteris s.l.
      - Malaifilix
      - Draconopteris s.s.
  - - - - Hypoderris
        - Triplophyllum
      - Tectaria
    - Arthropteris

Other sources do not recognize the genus Malaifilix, and place its sole species, Malaifilix grandidentata, in a more widely circumscribed Draconopteris as Draconopteris grandidentata.
