= Hypoderris =

Scientific classification
- Kingdom: Plantae
- Clade: Tracheophytes
- Division: Polypodiophyta
- Class: Polypodiopsida
- Order: Polypodiales
- Suborder: Polypodiineae
- Family: Tectariaceae
- Genus: Hypoderris; R.Br.

Species
- See text.

Genus of ferns

Hypoderris is a genus of ferns in the family Tectariaceae, according to the Pteridophyte Phylogeny Group classification of 2016 (PPG I).

== Taxonomy ==
The genus Hypoderris was erected by Robert Brown in 1830. The type species, Hypoderris brownii, was designated later by John Smith.

A 2016 molecular phylogenetic showed Hypoderris to be in a clade containing Tectaria, sister to Triplophyllum.

- Tectariaceae
  - - Pteridrys
    - - Malaifilix
      - Draconopteris
  - - Arthropteris
    - - Tectaria
      - - Hypoderris
        - Triplophyllum

=== Species ===
As of February 2020, the Checklist of Ferns and Lycophytes of the World recognized the following species:

- Hypoderris brauniana (H.Karst.) F.G.Wang & Christenh.
- Hypoderris brownii J.Sm.
- Hypoderris nicotianifolia (Baker) Moran et al.
