= Tectaria morlae =

Conservation status
- Data Deficient (IUCN 3.1)

Scientific classification
- Kingdom: Plantae
- Clade: Tracheophytes
- Division: Polypodiophyta
- Class: Polypodiopsida
- Order: Polypodiales
- Suborder: Polypodiineae
- Family: Tectariaceae
- Genus: Tectaria
- Species: T. morlae

Binomial name
- Tectaria morlae (Sodiro) C.Chr.

Species of fern

Tectaria morlae is a species of fern in the family Tectariaceae. It is endemic to Ecuador. Its natural habitat is subtropical or tropical moist lowland forests. It is threatened by habitat loss.
