= Fadyenia =

Fadyenia is a taxon synonym for two genera of plants:

- Fadyenia Endl., a synonym of Garrya Douglas ex Lindl.
- Fadyenia Hook., a synonym of Tectaria Cav.
