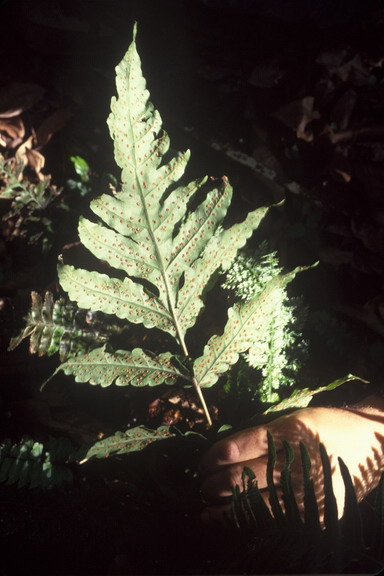

Scientific classification
- Kingdom: Plantae
- Clade: Tracheophytes
- Division: Polypodiophyta
- Class: Polypodiopsida
- Order: Polypodiales
- Suborder: Polypodiineae
- Family: Tectariaceae
- Genus: Tectaria
- Species: T. estremerana

Binomial name
- Tectaria estremerana Proctor & A.M.Evans

= Tectaria estremerana =

Species of plant

Tectaria estremerana is a rare species of fern known by the common name Puerto Rico halberd fern. It is endemic to Puerto Rico. It is a federally listed endangered species of the United States.

This fern has fronds up to 80 centimetres (31 inches) long, each with a hairy, orange brown stipe. The rachis is hairy and the leaf is divided into a few elongated leaflets.

When this plant was placed on the United States' Endangered Species List it was known from a population of 23 individuals in Arecibo, Puerto Rico. The ferns are located about 200 metres (220 yards) away from the Arecibo Radio Telescope. Later more individuals were discovered in Río Abajo Commonwealth Forest and in the municipality of Florida.
