= Tectaria chimborazensis =

Conservation status
- Data Deficient (IUCN 3.1)

Scientific classification
- Kingdom: Plantae
- Clade: Tracheophytes
- Division: Polypodiophyta
- Class: Polypodiopsida
- Order: Polypodiales
- Suborder: Polypodiineae
- Family: Tectariaceae
- Genus: Tectaria
- Species: T. chimborazensis

Binomial name
- Tectaria chimborazensis (C.Chr.) C.Chr.

Synonyms
- 1. Aspidium chimborazense C.Chr.; 2. Aspidium elatum J.Sm.; 3. Dryopteris elata Kuntze; 4. Nephrodium elatum Baker

Species of fern

Tectaria chimborazensis is a species of fern in the family Tectariaceae. It is endemic to Ecuador.

Its natural habitat is subtropical or tropical moist lowland forests. It is threatened by habitat loss.
