= Button fern =

Button fern is a common name for several plants and may refer to:

- Pellaea rotundifolia, a popular house plant native to New Zealand
- Tectaria cicutaria, native to the Caribbean

== See also ==
- Nephrolepis cordifolia - Lemon Button fern
