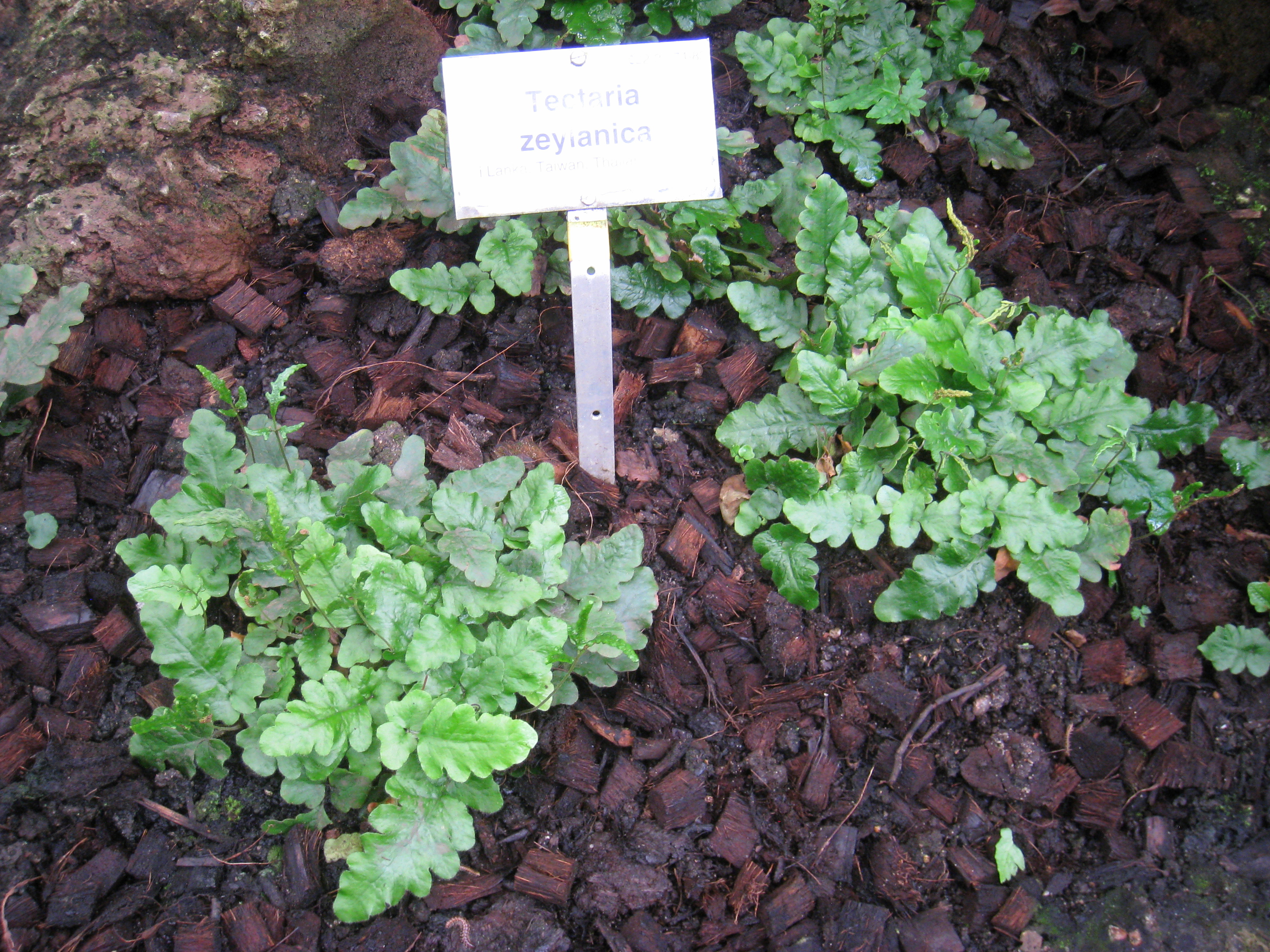

Scientific classification
- Kingdom: Plantae
- Clade: Tracheophytes
- Division: Polypodiophyta
- Class: Polypodiopsida
- Order: Polypodiales
- Suborder: Polypodiineae
- Family: Tectariaceae
- Genus: Tectaria
- Species: T. zeilanica

Binomial name
- Tectaria zeilanica (Houtt.) Sledge

= Tectaria zeilanica =

Species of fern

Tectaria zeilanica, the oak leaf fern, is a species of fern in the family Tectariaceae. It is native to Sri Lanka, India, and the Indochina region in southern China and Vietnam, and Taiwan.

It is a small fern, with erect fertile fronds, and sterile fronds shaped like small oak leaves. The name is often erroneously spelled 'zeylanica', but it was originally published as 'zeilanica', and this is not a correctable error under the International Code of Nomenclature for algae, fungi, and plants.

== Synonym ==
- Quercifilix zeilanica
