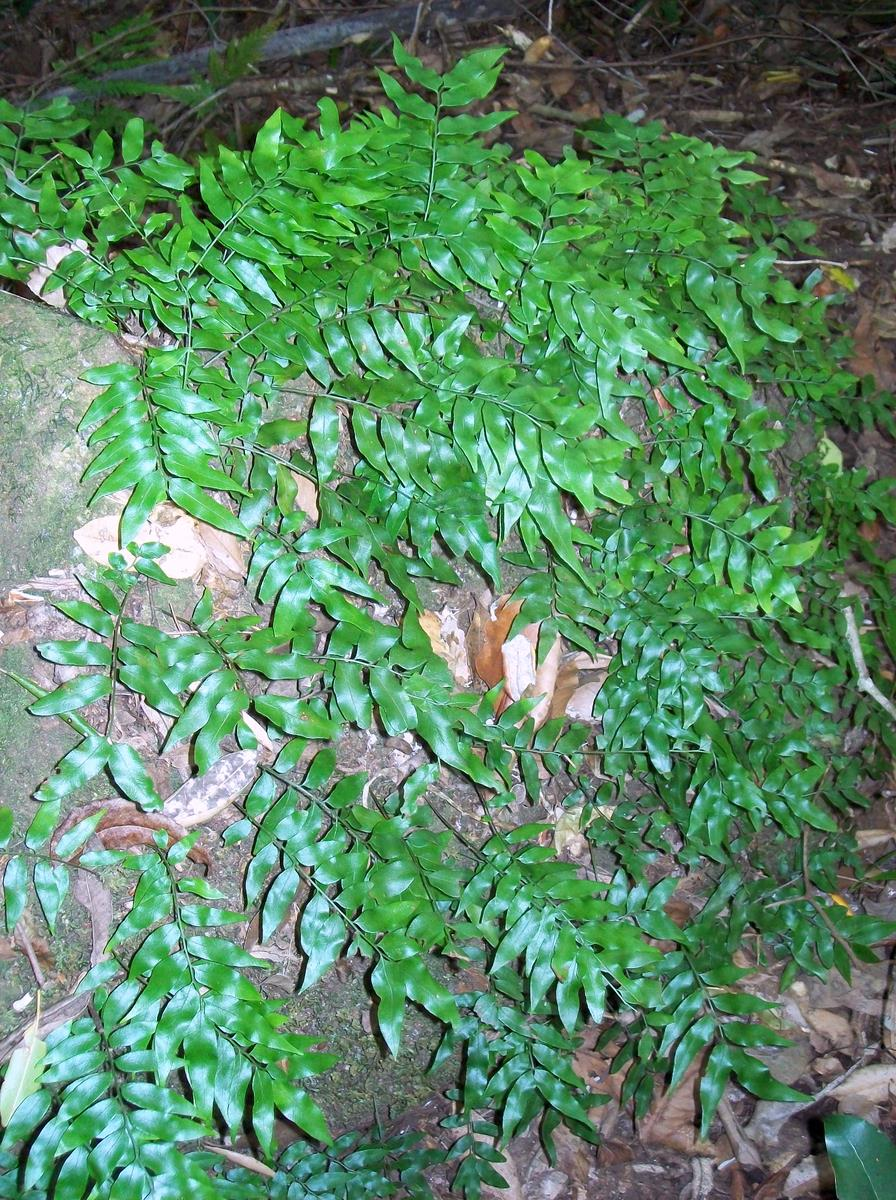
- Macquarie Pass National Park, Australia

Scientific classification
- Kingdom: Plantae
- Clade: Tracheophytes
- Division: Polypodiophyta
- Class: Polypodiopsida
- Order: Polypodiales
- Suborder: Polypodiineae
- Family: Tectariaceae
- Genus: Arthropteris
- Species: A. tenella

Binomial name
- Arthropteris tenella (G.Forst.) J.Sm. ex Hook.f.

= Arthropteris tenella =

Species of fern

Arthropteris tenella is a rainforest fern of the genus Arthropteris native to eastern Australia and New Zealand.

It is found in shady areas on rocks or on trees. The specific epithet tenella is from the Latin, meaning "delicate".
