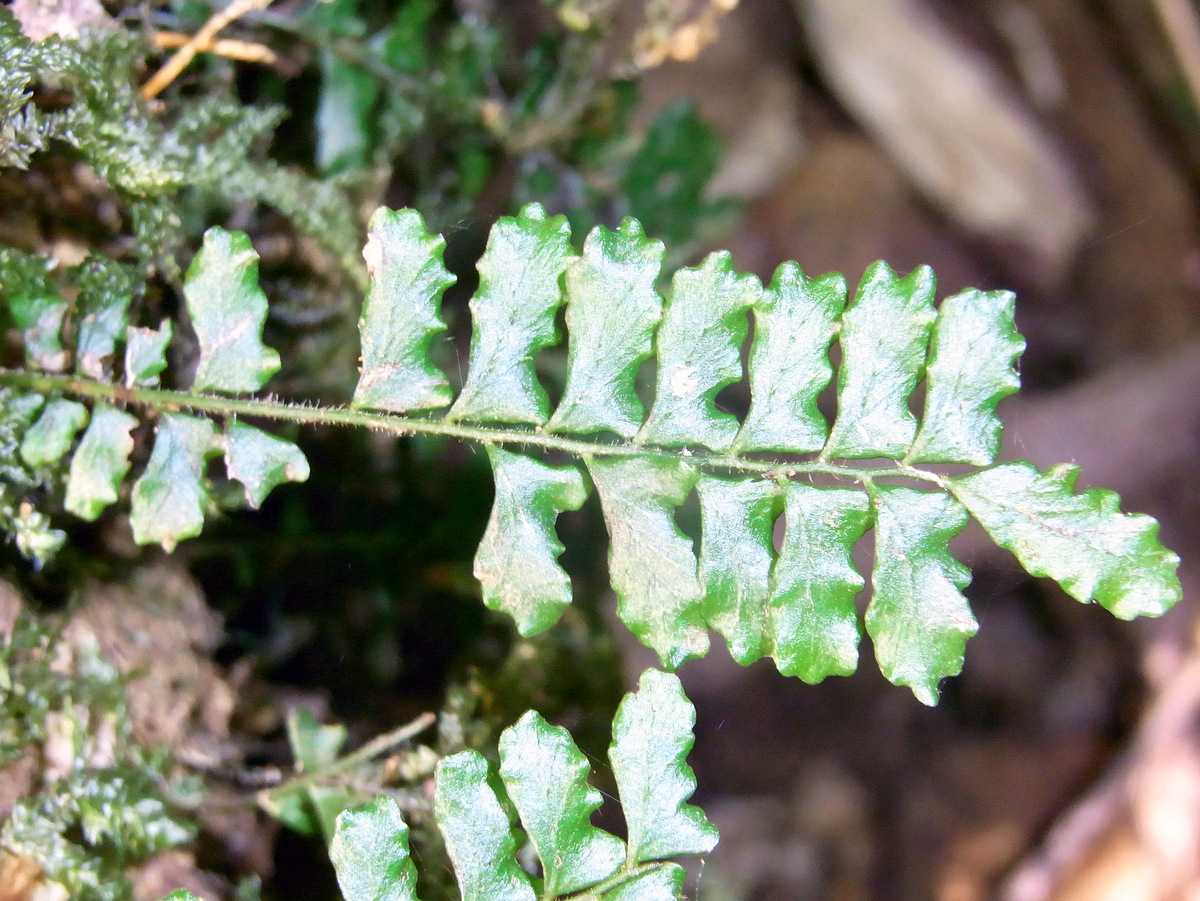
- Tapin Tops National Park, Australia

Scientific classification
- Kingdom: Plantae
- Clade: Tracheophytes
- Division: Polypodiophyta
- Class: Polypodiopsida
- Order: Polypodiales
- Suborder: Polypodiineae
- Family: Tectariaceae
- Genus: Arthropteris
- Species: A. beckleri

Binomial name
- Arthropteris beckleri (Hook.) Mett.

= Arthropteris beckleri =

Species of fern

Arthropteris beckleri, commonly known as the Hairy Climbing Fishbone Fern, is a small rainforest fern of the genus Arthropteris native to eastern Australia. It is found north of Nowra, usually growing on rocks or from trees in areas of high altitude.
