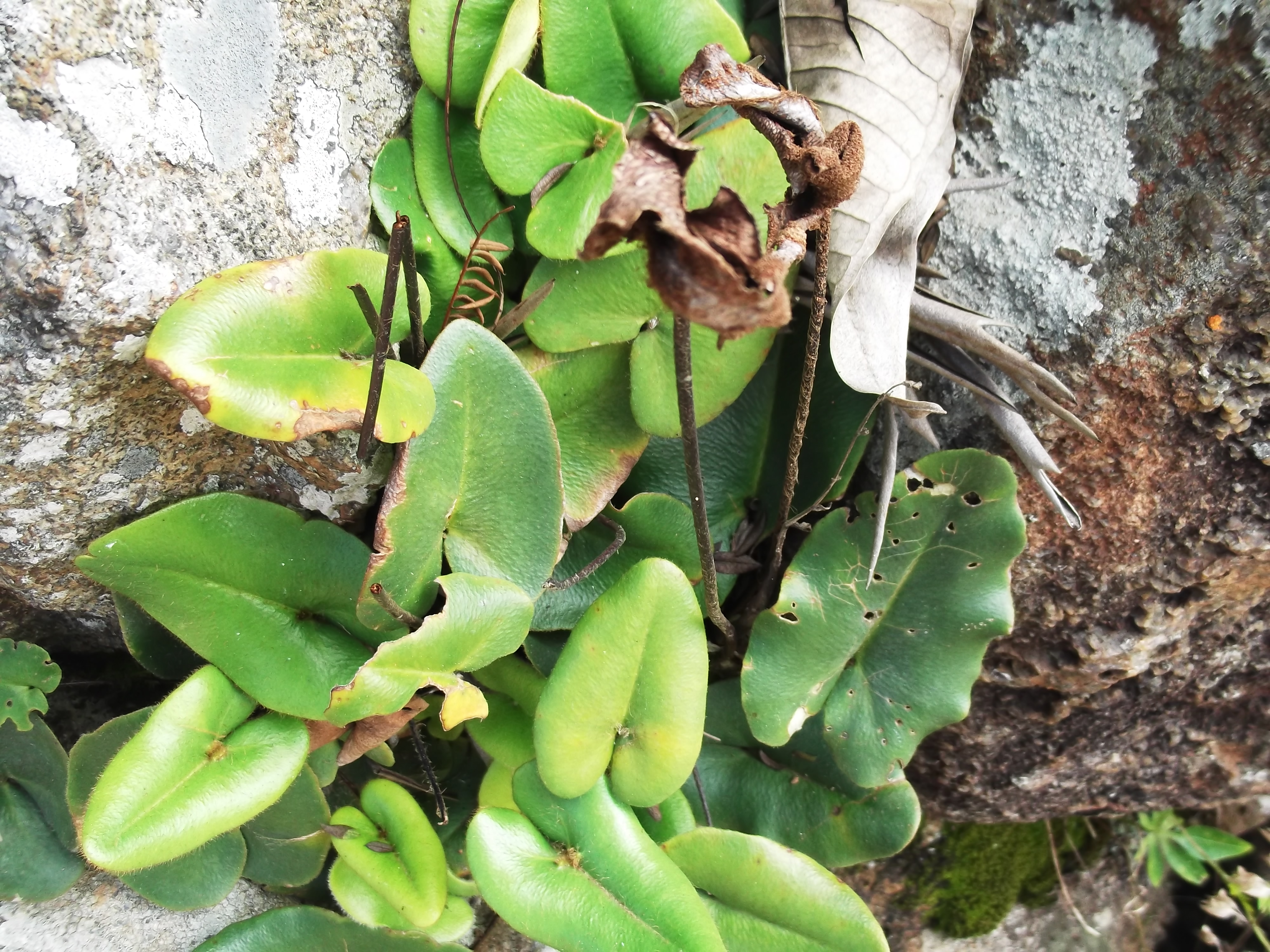
- Growing in Yercaud, India

Scientific classification
- Kingdom: Plantae
- Clade: Tracheophytes
- Division: Polypodiophyta
- Class: Polypodiopsida
- Order: Polypodiales
- Family: Pteridaceae
- Subfamily: Cheilanthoideae
- Genus: Parahemionitis
- Species: P. arifolia

Binomial name
- Parahemionitis arifolia (Burm.f.) Panigrahi

Synonyms
- Acrostichum ramentaceum Roxb.; Asplenium arifolium Burm.fil.; Gymnogramma sagittata (Fée) Ettingsh.; Hemionitis cordata Roxb. ex Hook. & Grev.; Hemionitis cordifolia Roxb. ex Wall.; Hemionitis cumingiana Fée; Hemionitis hastata R.Br. ex Wall.; Hemionitis intermedia Fée; Hemionitis sagittata Fée; Hemionitis toxotis Trevis.; Hemionitis trinervis Buch.-Ham. ex Dillwyn; Mickelopteris cordata (Hook. & Grev.) Fraser-Jenk.; Parahemionitis cordata (Roxb. ex Hook. & Grev.) Fraser-Jenk.

= Parahemionitis arifolia =

Genus of ferns

Parahemionitis arifolia is a species of ferns in the subfamily Cheilanthoideae and the family Pteridaceae; it was placed previously in a monotypic genus Mickelopteris with the species M. cordata. Other synonyms include Parahemionitis cordata and various species names in the now much reduced genus Hemionitis. This species is native to South and south-eastern Asia, from India to Taiwan and the Philippines.

This is the type species of genus Parahemionitis, which was initially published as Asplenium arifolium in 1768; the taxonomy of this whole subfamily is not accepted by all sources.

== Description ==
Parahemionitis arifolia grows from short erect rhizomes covered with brownish narrow scales. The fronds are of two types. Fertile (spore-bearing) fronds have stipes (stalks) that are usually much longer than those of sterile fronds. The blade (lamina) of the frond is usually 3–6 cm (1.2–2.4 in) long by about 2–4 cm (0.8–1.6 in) wide, with a heart-shaped base and a somewhat rounded apex. It is held at an angle to the stipe. Fronds are brownish green on the upper side, brown on the lower side.

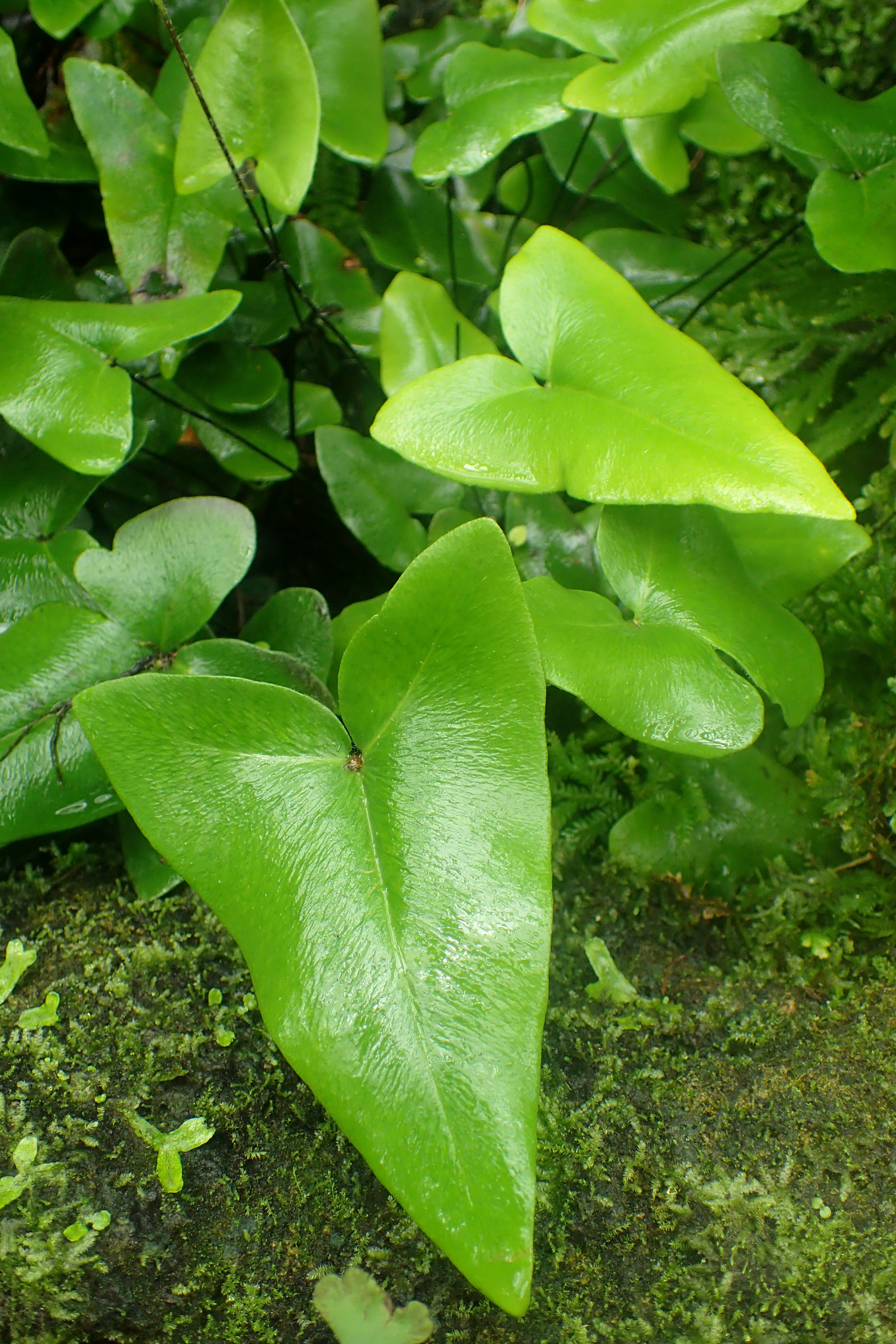
Frond shape

== Taxonomy ==
The nomenclature and taxonomy of the species is somewhat tangled. A species of fern native to the Indian subcontinent and other parts of tropical Asia was described in 1828 as Hemionitis cordata. This name was later considered to be a (heterotypic) synonym of Hemionitis arifolia. As this was an older name, being based on Asplenium arifolium published in 1768, the species was known as Hemionitis arifolia. In 1974, John T. Mickel considered that the species he called Hemionitis arifolia might be sufficiently different from the other (American) species placed in Hemionitis to require a new genus. The differences included frond morphology and which flavonoids were present. Molecular phylogenetic studies have since confirmed the distinctiveness of the species.

Accordingly, in 1993, Gopinath Panigrahi created a new genus for the species, Parahemionitis. He typified the genus using Asplenium arifolium Burm.f., and called the sole species Parahemionitis arifolia. However, it has since become clear that the original type of Asplenium arifolium is actually a specimen of a completely different species, Acrostichum aureum, which would mean that Asplenium arifolium is not a synonym of Hemionitis cordata. Three alternative approaches have been taken to fix this problem. In 2015, Mazumdar designated a lectotype and an epitype for Asplenium arifolium, and regarded Panagrahi's use of the name Parahemionitis arifolia as acceptable. In 1997, Christopher Fraser-Jenkins regarded Panagrahi's genus name as acceptable, but not the epithet, and called the species Parahemionitis cordata. In 2016, Fraser-Jenkins rejected the genus name, and published a new one, Mickelopteris, with the sole species being called Mickelopteris cordata. As of January 2020, the Checklist of Ferns and Lycophytes of the World followed Fraser-Jenkins (2016), treating the species as Mickelopteris cordata, and Hemionitis arifolia and Parahemionitis arifolia as a synonyms of Acrostichum aureum.

As of March 2026, Plants of the World Online maintains a much broader circumscription of Hemionitis, and so retained the species as Hemionitis arifolia.

== Distribution and habitat ==
Parahemionitis arifolia is native to the Indian subcontinent (Assam, Bangladesh, the region of India, Sri Lanka), Indochina (Cambodia, Laos, Myanmar, Peninsular Malaysia, Thailand, Vietnam), south-central China and Hainan, the Philippines and the Lesser Sunda Islands. It is found in damp locations, such as the wet soil and rocks of river valleys in dense forests and shrublands, growing below elevations of 1000 m.
