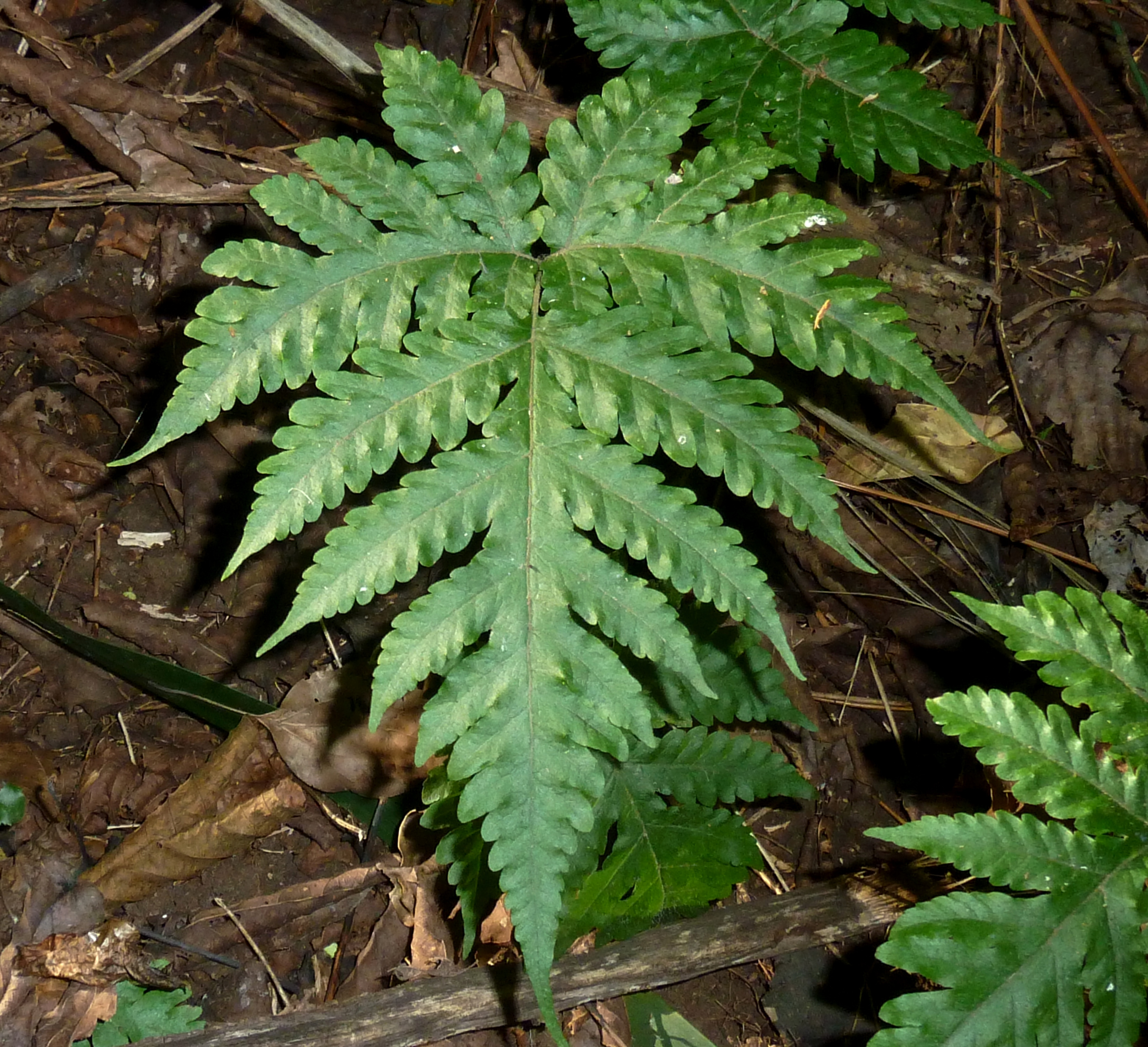

Scientific classification
- Kingdom: Plantae
- Clade: Tracheophytes
- Division: Polypodiophyta
- Class: Polypodiopsida
- Order: Polypodiales
- Suborder: Polypodiineae
- Family: Tectariaceae
- Genus: Tectaria
- Species: T. gemmifera

Binomial name
- Tectaria gemmifera (Fée) Alston

Synonyms
- Aspidium cicutarium sensu Sim; Aspidium cicutarium (L.) Sw.; Aspidium coadunatum Kaulf.; Aspidium decaryanum C.Chr.; Aspidium gemmiferum (Fée) Ching; Nephrodium cicutarium sensu Sim; Nephrodium cicutarium (L.) Baker; Sagenia gemmifera Fée; Tectaria coadunata C.Chr.

= Tectaria gemmifera =

Snail fern

Species of fern

Tectaria gemmifera, the snail fern, is a species of fern in the family Tectariaceae. It is native to Africa from the equator southwards, and is present in the DRC, Uganda, Kenya, Tanzania, Rwanda, Burundi, Angola, Zambia, Malawi, Mozambique, Zimbabwe, South Africa and Madagascar. Its natural habitat is deeply shaded forest floors of moist subtropical or tropical forest, and it occurs from 600 to 2,550 metres above sea level. The Latin name refers to the gemma that are produced by the fronds of this species.
