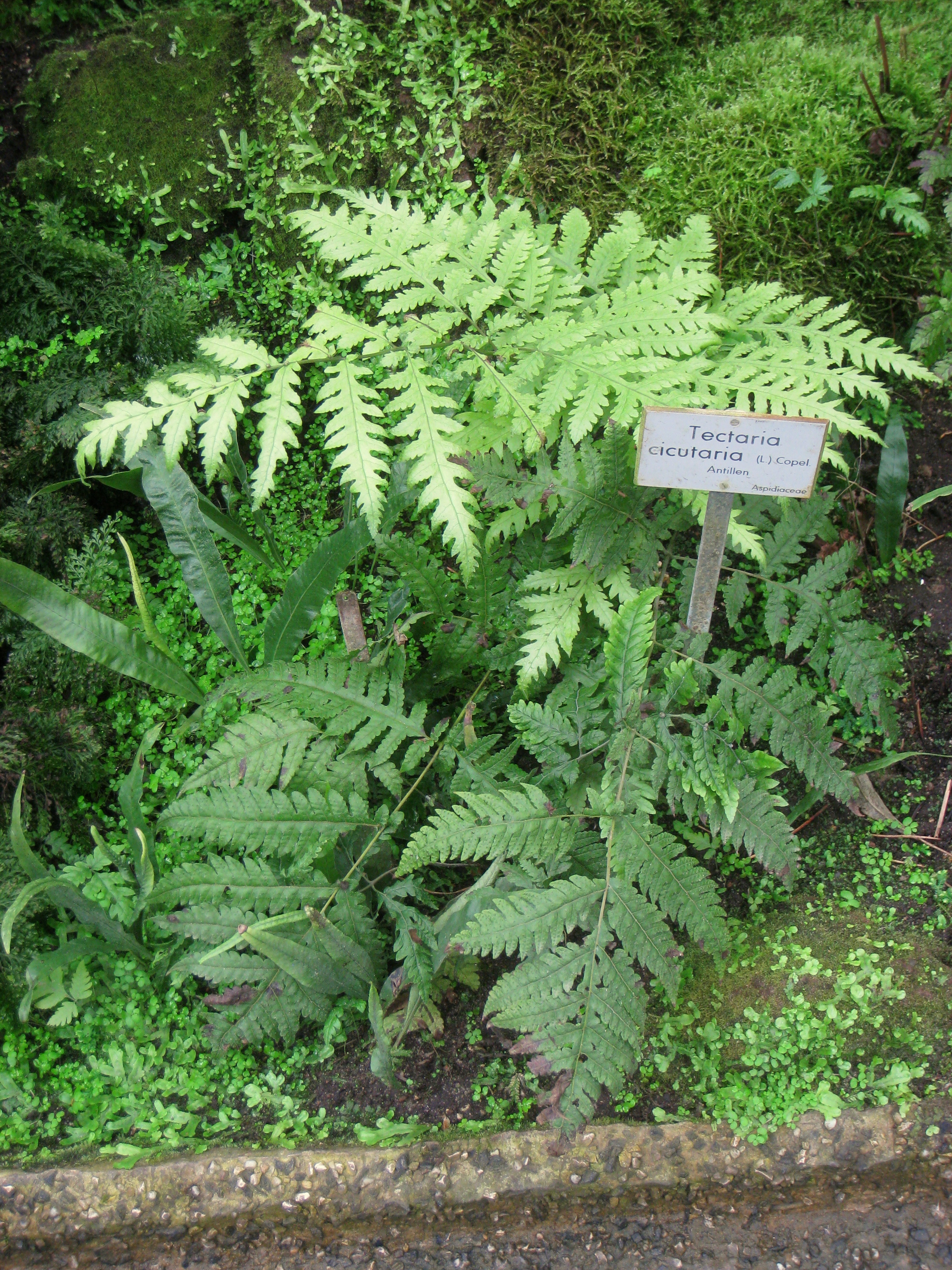

Scientific classification
- Kingdom: Plantae
- Clade: Embryophytes
- Clade: Tracheophytes
- Division: Polypodiophyta
- Class: Polypodiopsida
- Order: Polypodiales
- Suborder: Polypodiineae
- Family: Tectariaceae
- Genus: Tectaria
- Species: T. cicutaria

Binomial name
- Tectaria cicutaria (L.) Copeland

= Tectaria cicutaria =

Species of fern

Tectaria cicutaria, the button fern, is a species of fern in the family Tectariaceae, native to the Antilles. It has thin, soft, triangular fronds up to about 3.5 feet in length; blades are once- or twice-pinnate with the final segments pinnately-lobed. The rhizome is short and erect.
