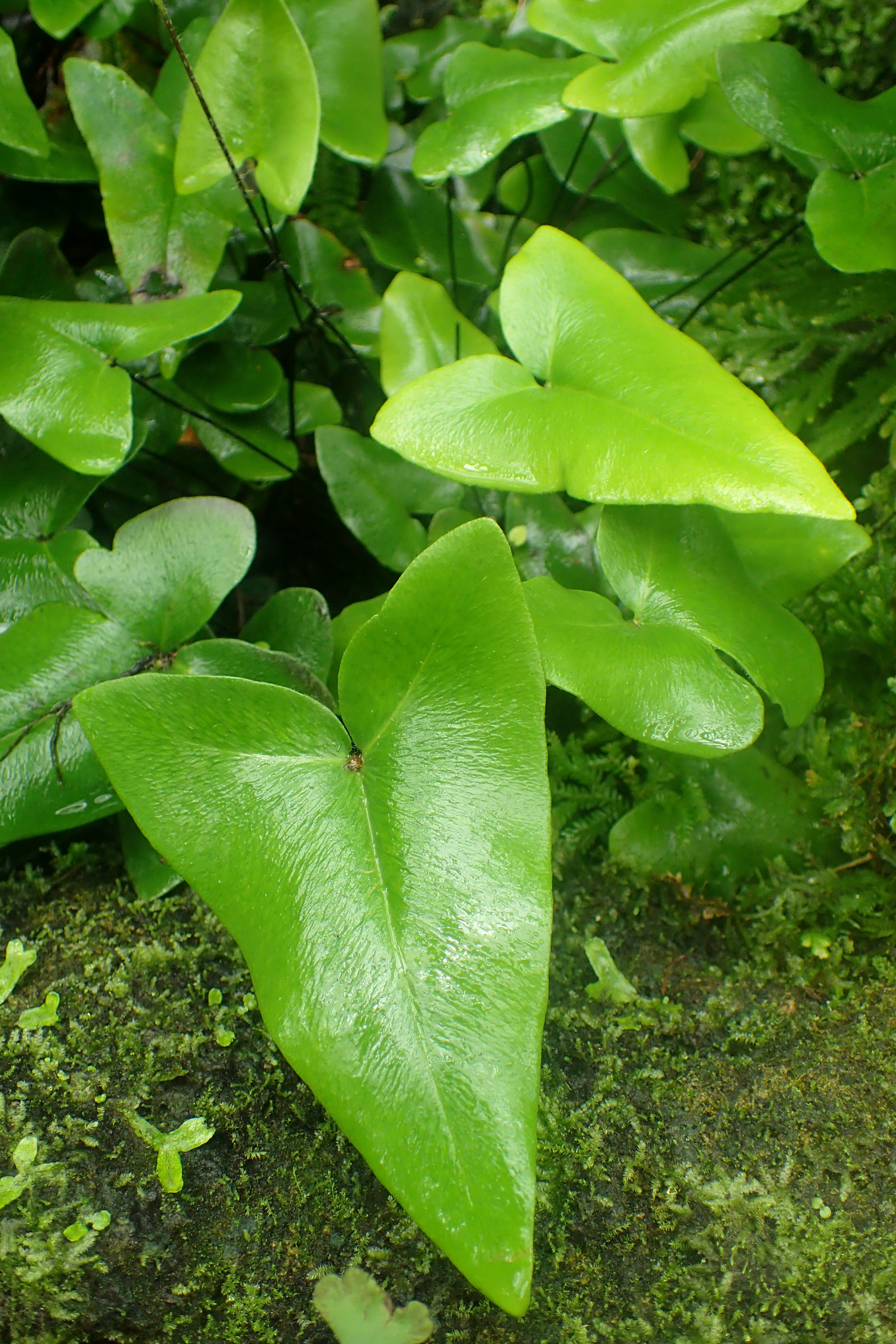
- Parahemionitis arifolia

Scientific classification
- Kingdom: Plantae
- Clade: Embryophytes
- Clade: Tracheophytes
- Division: Polypodiophyta
- Class: Polypodiopsida
- Order: Polypodiales
- Family: Pteridaceae
- Subfamily: Cheilanthoideae
- Genus: Parahemionitis; Panigrahi

Synonyms
- Mickelopteris (Roxb. ex Hook. & Grev.) Fraser-Jenk.

= Parahemionitis =

Genus of ferns

Parahemionitis is a genus of ferns in the family Pteridaceae, erected by Gopinath Panigrahi in 1992.

== Species ==
As of July 2026, the Checklist of Ferns and Lycophytes of the World recognized the following three species:

1. Parahemionitis arifolia (Burm.f.) Panigrahi - type species from South and SE Asia (synonyms include P. cordata (Roxb. ex Hook. & Grev.) Fraser-Jenk.)
2. Parahemionitis cordifolia (Baker) Windham & Schuettp. - Madagascar (synonyms include Hemionitis goabica)
3. Parahemionitis humbertii (Tardieu) Windham & Schuettp. - Madagascar
