= Polydictyum =

Scientific classification
- Kingdom: Plantae
- Clade: Tracheophytes
- Division: Polypodiophyta
- Class: Polypodiopsida
- Order: Polypodiales
- Suborder: Polypodiineae
- Family: Polypodiaceae
- Genus: Polydictyum; C.Presl

Species
- 4; see text

Synonyms
- Cardiochlaena Fée

Genus of ferns

Polydictyum is a genus of ferns. It includes four species which range from Vietnam and Hainan through Malesia and Papuasia to Queensland and the southwest Pacific.

== Species ==
Four species are accepted.

- Polydictyum juglandifolium (Baker) Li Bing Zhang & Liang Zhang
- Polydictyum menyanthidis (C.Presl) C.Presl
- Polydictyum ternatum (Baker) S.Y.Dong & C.W.Chen
- Polydictyum variabile (Tardieu & Ching) S.Y.Dong & C.W.Chen
