= Gopinath Panigrahi =

Indian botanist (1924–2004)

- Born: 27 February 1924; Baikunthapur, Basudevpur, Bhadrakh, Orissa, India
- Died: 23 December 2004 (aged 80); Kolkata India
- Education: Ravenshaw College, Bhubaneswar; University of Leeds, UK
- Occupation: Botanist/plant taxonomist

Gopinath Panigrahi (27 February 1924 – 23 December 2004) was an Indian botanist and plant taxonomist. He was born in the village Baikunthapur, Basudebpur block, Bhadrak district, Orissa, India and obtained a Ph.D. in 1954 from the University of Leeds where he studied Cytogenetics.

He married his late first wife, Shantilata Panigrahi (née, Sabat) in June, 1948. She was an accomplished amateur dancer in Kathakali-Odissi systems of dancing, and a Government of Orissa scholar at Shantiniketan. They had four children (two sons and two daughters). His second wife, 'Sarojini G. Panigrahi (née, Tara Waman Kelkar of Pune) died when he was seventy. She had received a M.Phil. degree from Reading University and was a poet in Marathi literature. His first son, Devananda, was a poultry scientist and died on 23 December 2004. His eldest daughter, Meera, is a retired senior lecturer in English literature under the Government of Orissa. His second daughter, Smt. Soumya Panda, is a teacher.

== Career ==
- Emeritus Scientist, Botanical Survey of India (BSI) from 1 March 1982 to 28 February 1987.
- Joint Director, Central Botanical Laboratory, from July 1978 to February 1982 (superannuated).
- Deputy Director, Special/Headquarters, Botanical Survey of India (BSI), Howrah, from January 1976 to June 1977; of Central National Herbarium, Howrah, from June 1977 to July 1978.
- Regional Botanist/Indian Liaison Officer at Royal Botanic Gardens, Kew, England, United Kingdom (UK) from December 1972 to December 1975.
- Regional Botanist, Botanical Survey of India (BSI), from December 1959 to December 1972.
- Systematic Botanist, Botanical Survey of India (BSI), Government of India, from August 1956 to December 1959.
- Lecturer in Botany, Ravenshaw College, Cuttack, Orissa Education Service, from July 1948 to July 1956.

=== Contributions ===
- Established Tragus roxburghii Panigr. as a new species in 1974 to replace T. biflorus (Roxb.) Schult., nom. illeg. (cf. Bor, 1960, 1970 vis-a-vis Saldanha & Nicolson, 1976).
- Established a new family Tectariaceae (1986) to replace Aspiciaceae Mett. et Frank, nom. illeg. and two new genera, Brachycaulos Dixit and Panigr. (1981) (Rosaceae) and Parahemionitis – Parahemionitis arifolia (N. Burm.) Panigr. replaces the old World taxon, Hemionitis arifolia (N.Burm.) T. Moore.
- Selected the lectotypes for several taxa: the one involving Gymnogramma calomelanos var. aureoflava Hook, (1862) changed the concept of pteridologists all the world over (cf Tryon, 1962 and Tryon & Tryon, 1982).
- His selection of Faure 646-bis (P) as the lectotype of Aspidium jaculosum Christ (1904) in 1975, was accepted by Holttum (1976).
- Revised Isoetes L. in India (cf. Jermy, 1990); Isoetes bilaspurensis Panigr. (1981) has been confirmed as a good species by Pant et al. (1993) through their SEM study of spores.
- Resuscitated Polypodium griffithii Fee (1852) and transferred it to Thelypteris Schmidel as T. griffithiana (Fee) Panigr. (1975).
- Identified the West Himalayan taxon known to date as Diplazium polypodioides auctt. as Diplazium fieldingianum (Kunze) Panigr. (1975).
- His hybridisation of a number of cytological types within Cyclosorus parasiticus complex (Panigrahi & Manton, 1958), Asplenium aethiopicum complex (Panigrahi, 1963), Aleuritipteris farinosa complex (Panigrahi, 1962) and Dryopteris villarii complex (Panigrahi, 1965), yielded significant new data to view the taxonomy of these taxa in new light and also to postulate the origin and migration of flora between Africa and India. 'Holttum (1976), Iwatsuki (1965) and A.R. Smith (1990) have referred to the work done on Cyclosorus as significant with regard to dominance and recessiveness of several characters. Discovery of a tetraploid cytotype in Dryopteris villarsii complex has led to Dryopteris submontana (Fraser-Jenkins & Jermy) Fraser-Jenkins being described as a new amphidiploid species in the European flora.
- Cytotaxonomic studies in Indian Polypodiaceae have enabled him to postulate a hypothesis (Panigrahi & Patnaik, 1963) to explain the low percentage and grade of euploidy as due to its epiphytic habit, contrary to Manton's (1953) and Mehra's (1961) postulate on the subject of evolutionary trends amongst the tropical/subtropical ferns. Bir (1973) and Sota (1973) have referred to this hypothesis in their critical reviews of recent advances in the cytological evolution of ferns.

=== Professional societies ===
- Elected President, Orissa Botanical Society, Bhubaneswar, in 1983, and delivered an address entitled, 'Macrosystematics of Angiosperms', in November 1983;
- Elected President, Indian Fern Society, Patiala, for two years of 1993 and 1994;
- Elected Fellow of the Linnean Society, London (FLS), in 1973; of the Indian Fern Society (FIFS) in 1992; of the West Bengal Academy of Science and Technology (FAST) in 1991; of the Indian Botanical Society in 1962 (FBS);
- Elected as a member of the Sectional Committee of the Botany Section, Indian Science Congress at Roorkee in 1961, and again at Mysore, in 1982;
- A Life Member of the Systematic Association, British Isles, UK; of the International Association of Plant Taxonomists (IAPT), Netherlands; of the Indian Botanical Society; of the International Society of Plant Morphologists, of the Indian Society of Genetics and Plant Breeding, of the Botanical societies of Orissa, West Bengal, and Bangladesh, amongst others;

=== Awards and distinctions ===
- The Indian Botanical Society (IBS), founded in 1920, awarded him on 21 October 1994, the Panchanan Maheshwari Gold Medal for his researches in diverse fields of Botanical Science.
- The Indian Botanical Society (IBS) also felicitated him on his attaining 70 years of age at Chandigarh on 21 October 1994 and in instituting a Commemoration Lecture Series known as Dr Gopinath Panigrahi Lectures to be delivered by distinguished botanists of India, on invitation, from time to time.
- He is the founder of the Computer-data Bank Unit in the Botanical Survey of India, and has initiated work involving the preparation of the Type Specimens Register of Indian plant taxa.
- Delivered the keynote address in the 8th Biennial Botanical Conference held in Dhaka in December 1994, and his talk on 'Economic Plants excluding medicinal plants' (in press);

=== Research publications ===
He has published more than 300 scientific papers between 1951 and 1995 and authored or co-authored four multi-volume works.

- Flora of Bilaspur District, M.P. in two volumes (1989, 1996) with Dr S.K. Murti as a joint author.
- The family Rosaceae Juss. in India, sensu lato: (Revisionary studies on 23 of the 37 genera). Vol. 1 (1991) with Dr K.M. Purohit as a joint author and Vols. 2, 3, and 4 with Chhabi Ghora, Arvind Kumar and B.K. Dikshit, respectively, as joint authors
- Pteridophytic flora of the Tirap District, Arunachal Pradesh: Vol. 1 and Vol. 2, with Sarnam Singh as a coauthor
- Flora of Orissa (Polypetalae & Monocotyledons):

He acted as the botanical editor of the Flora of the USSR (English Translation) Vol. 25 (1990), Vols. 22 and 30 (1994), and Vol. 26 (1995) (translated into English from the Russian text by M/S Doon Scientific Co. Dehra Dun).
