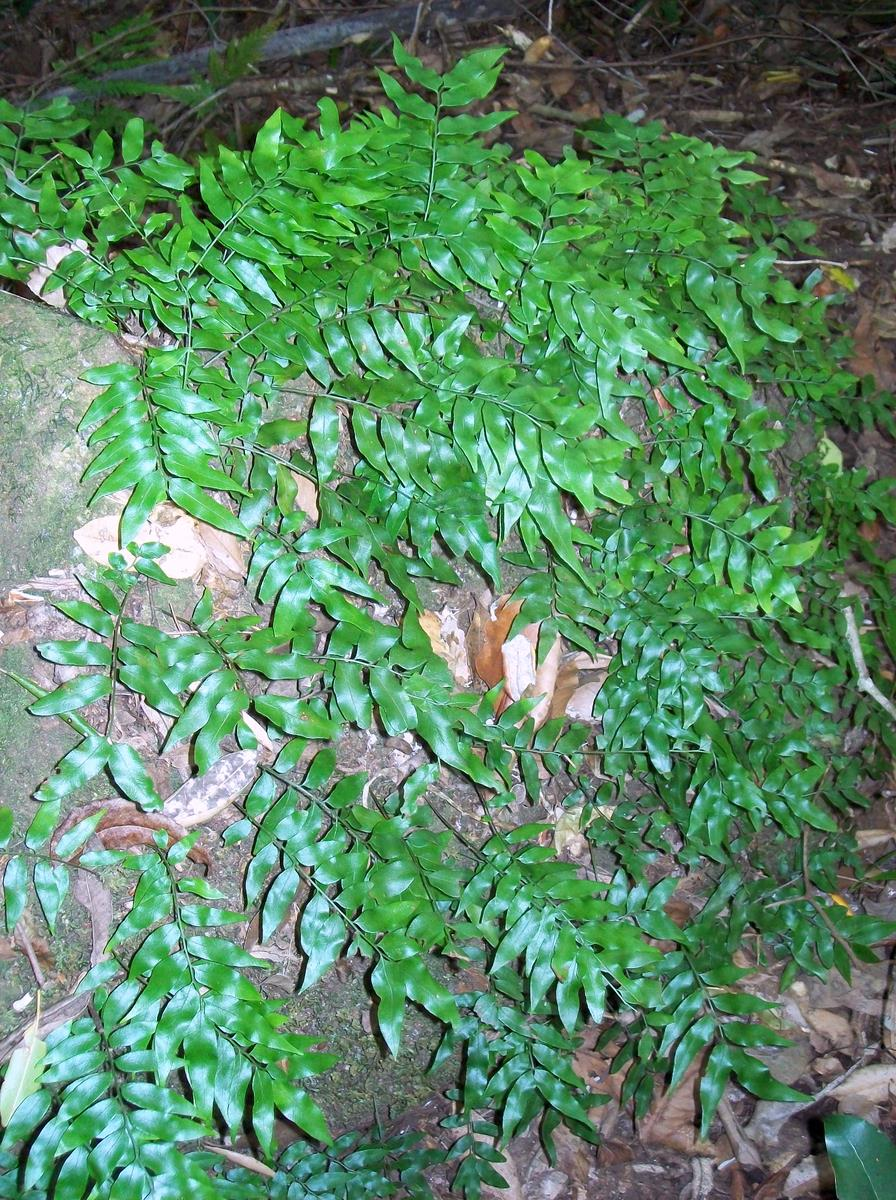
- Arthropteris tenella
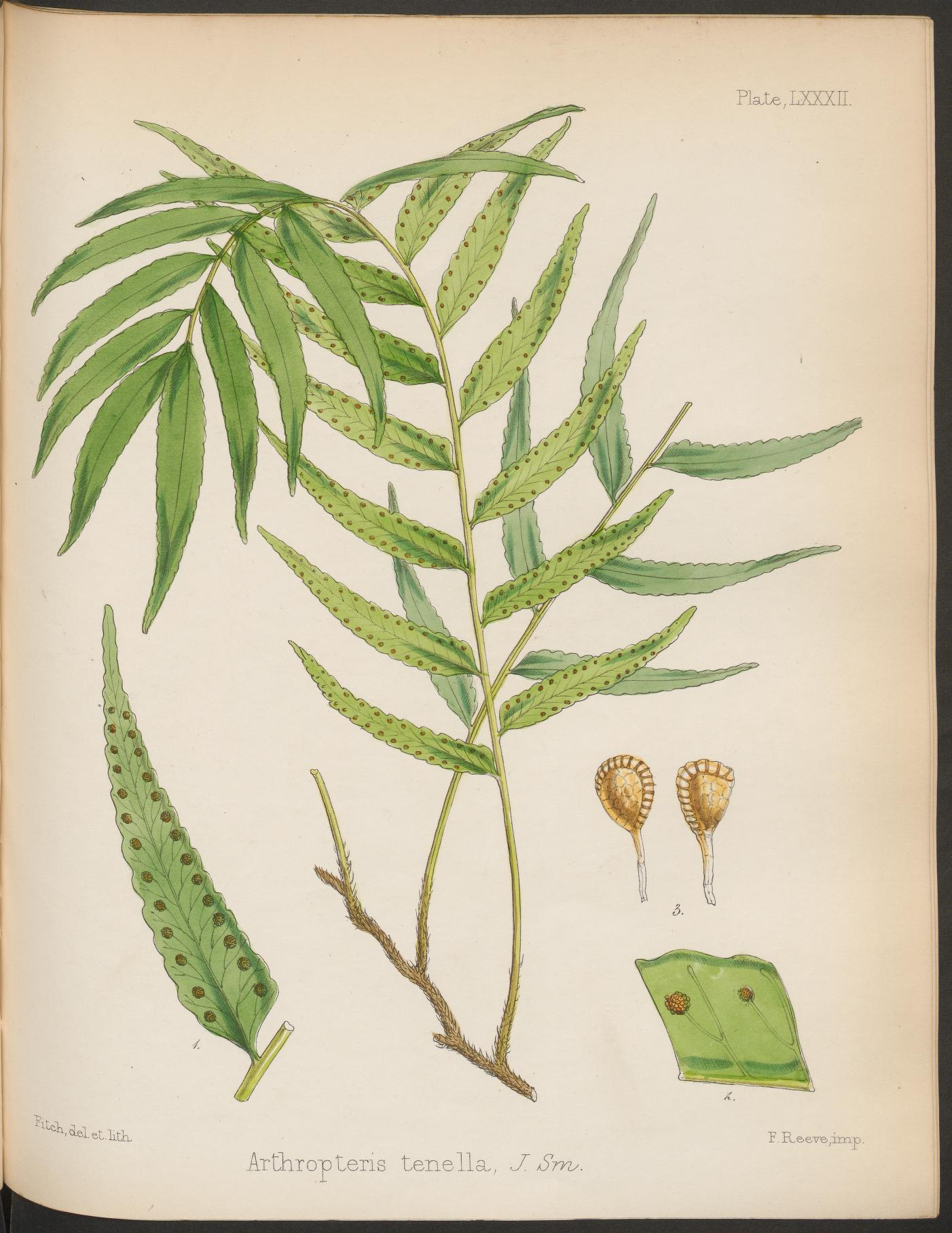
- Arthropteris tenella Plate LXXXII

Scientific classification
- Kingdom: Plantae
- Clade: Tracheophytes
- Division: Polypodiophyta
- Class: Polypodiopsida
- Order: Polypodiales
- Suborder: Polypodiineae
- Family: Tectariaceae
- Genus: Arthropteris; J.Sm. ex Hook.f.

Species
- See text.

= Arthropteris =

Genus of ferns

Arthropteris is a small genus of ferns in family Tectariaceae, according to the Pteridophyte Phylogeny Group classification of 2016 (PPG I). It was previously placed in the families Oleandraceae or Davalliaceae. The genus is native to Australia, Europe, Asia and Africa. Around 12 to 21 species are considered part of this genus. The name Arthropteris is from the Greek, meaning "jointed fern", referring to the joint at the base of the petiole.

The type species is Arthropteris tenella.

== Species ==
As of February 2020, the Checklist of Ferns and Lycophytes of the World recognized the following species:

- Arthropteris altescandens (Colla) J.Sm.
- Arthropteris articulata (Brack.) C.Chr.
- Arthropteris beckleri (Hook.) Mett.
- Arthropteris boutoniana (Hook.) Pic.Serm.
- Arthropteris cameroonensis Alston
- Arthropteris monocarpa (Cordem.) C.Chr.
- Arthropteris neocaledonica Copel.
- Arthropteris orientalis (J.F.Gmel.) Posth. (syn. Arthropteris albopunctata J.Sm.)
- Arthropteris palisotii (Desv.) Alston (syn. Arthropteris repens (Brack.) C.Chr.)
- Arthropteris parallela (Baker) C.Chr.
- Arthropteris paucivenia (C.Chr.) H.M.Liu, Hovenkamp & H.Schneid.
- Arthropteris submarginalis Domin
- Arthropteris tenella (G.Forst.) J.Sm. ex Hook.f.
