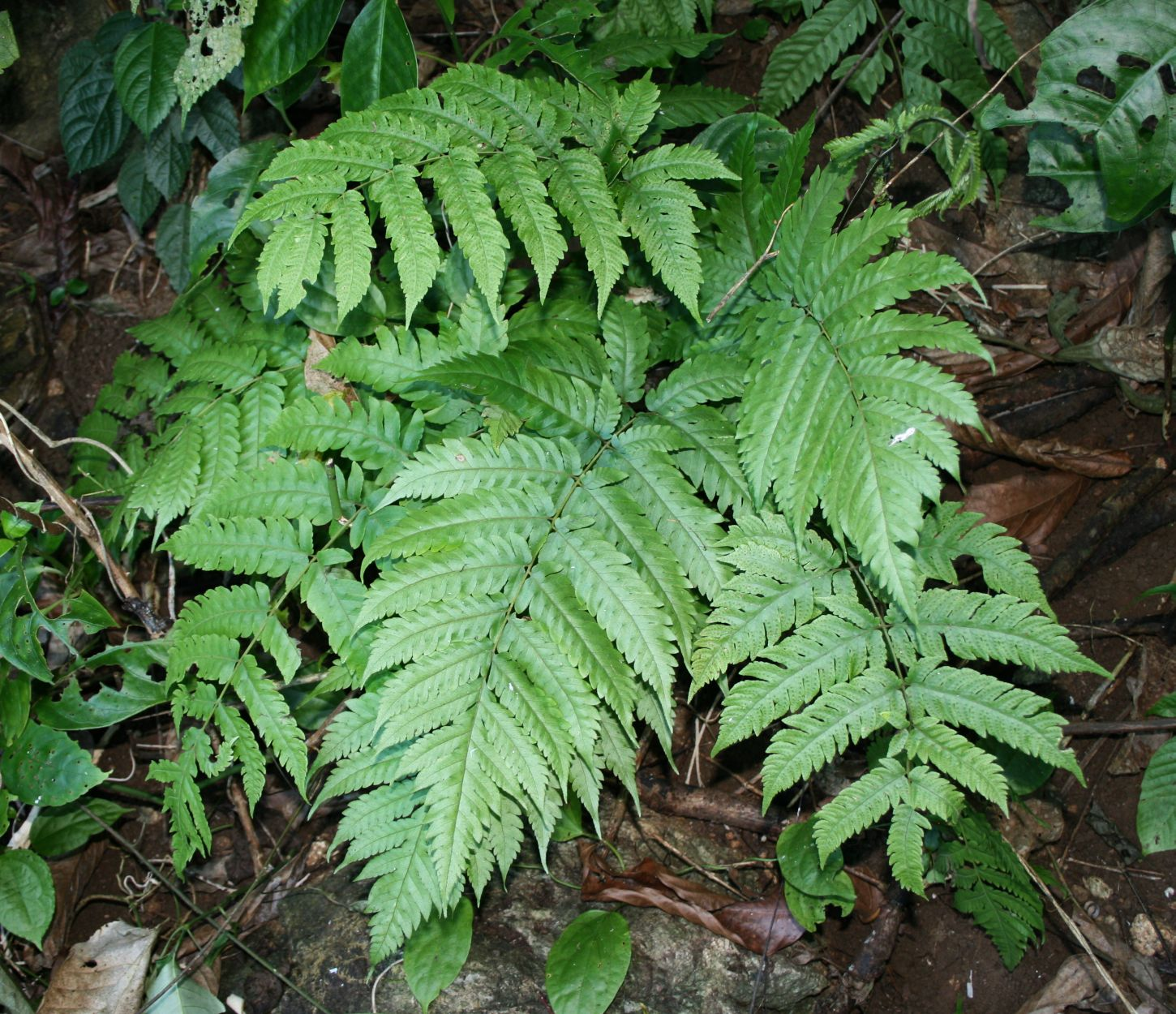
- T. paradoxa

Scientific classification
- Kingdom: Plantae
- Clade: Tracheophytes
- Division: Polypodiophyta
- Class: Polypodiopsida
- Order: Polypodiales
- Suborder: Polypodiineae
- Family: Tectariaceae
- Genus: Tectaria; Cav.

Species
- About 200, see text.

Synonyms
- Aenigmopteris Holttum; Amphiblestra C.Presl; Aspidium Sw.; Bathmium (C. Presl) Link; Camptodium Fée; Cardiochlaena Fée; Chlamydogramme Holttum; Cionidium Moore; Ctenitopsis Ching ex Tardieu & C.Chr.; Depariopsis Baker; Dictyoxiphium Hook.; Dryomenis Fée; Fadyenia Hook.; Grammatosorus Regel; Hemigramma Christ; Heterogonium C.Presl; Lenda Koidz.; Lobochlaena Fée; Luerssenia Kuhn ex Luerss.; Melanopteris J.Sm. ex Hook.; Microbrochis C.Presl; Palma-filix Adans.; Patanema J.Sm.; Phlebiogonium Fée; × Pleuroderris Maxon; Podopeltis Fée; Psomiocarpa C.Presl; Quercifilix Copel.; Sagenia C.Presl; Stenosemia C.Presl; Tectaridium Copel.; Trichiocarpa (Hook.) J.Sm.

= Tectaria =

Genus of ferns

Tectaria is a genus of fern in the family Tectariaceae, according to the Pteridophyte Phylogeny Group classification of 2016 (PPG I). Halberd fern is a common name for species in this genus.

== Species ==
As of February 2020, the Checklist of Ferns and Lycophytes of the World recognized the following species and hybrids:

- Tectaria acerifolia R.C.Moran
- Tectaria acrocarpa (Ching) Christenh.
- Tectaria adenophora Copel.
- Tectaria aenigma C.W.Chen & C.J.Rothf.
- Tectaria aequatoriensis (Hieron.) C.Chr.
- Tectaria amblyotis (Baker) C.Chr.
- Tectaria × amesiana A.A.Eaton = T. coriandrifolia × T. lobata
- Tectaria amphiblestra R.M.Tryon & A.F.Tryon
- Tectaria andersonii Holttum
- Tectaria angelicifolia (Schum.) Copel.
- Tectaria angulata (Willd.) Copel.
- Tectaria antioquiana (Baker) C.Chr.
- Tectaria aspidioides (C.Presl) Copel.
- Tectaria athyrioides (Baker) C.Chr.
- Tectaria athyriosora M.G.Price
- Tectaria atropurpurea A.R.Sm.
- Tectaria aurita (Sw.) S.Chandra
- Tectaria balansae (C.Chr.) C.Chr.
- Tectaria barberi (Hook.) Copel.
- Tectaria barteri (J.Sm.) C.Chr.
- Tectaria beccariana (Ces.) C.Chr.
- Tectaria blumeana (Regel) C.V.Morton
- Tectaria borneensis S.Y.Dong
- Tectaria brachiata (Zoll. & Moritz) C.V.Morton
- Tectaria brevilobata Holttum
- Tectaria brooksii Copel.
- Tectaria × bulbifera Jermy & T.G.Walker
- Tectaria calcarea (J.Sm.) Copel.
- Tectaria caluffii Riv.-Giró & C.Sánchez
- Tectaria camerooniana (Hook.) Alston
- Tectaria ceramensis (Holttum) S.Y.Dong
- Tectaria × chaconiana A.Rojas
- Tectaria chattagramica (C.B.Clarke) Ching
- Tectaria cherasica Holttum
- Tectaria chimborazensis (C.Chr.) C.Chr.
- Tectaria chinensis (Ching & Chu H.Wang) Christenh.
- Tectaria christovalensis (C.Chr.) Alston
- Tectaria cicutaria (L.) Copel.
- Tectaria coadunata (Wall. ex Hook. & Grev.) C.Chr.
- Tectaria colaniae (Tardieu & C.Chr.) comb. ined.
- Tectaria confluens (F.Muell. ex Baker) Pic. Serm.
- Tectaria corallorum Holttum
- Tectaria coriandrifolia (Sw.) Underw.
- Tectaria craspedocarpa Copel.
- Tectaria crenata Cav.
- Tectaria croftii Holttum
- Tectaria curtisii Holttum
- Tectaria × cynthiae L.D.Gómez = T. nicaraguensis × T. nicotianifolia
- Tectaria danfuensis Holttum
- Tectaria darienensis A.Rojas
- Tectaria decurrens (C.Presl) Copel.
- Tectaria degeneri Copel.
- Tectaria dissecta (G.Forst.) Lellinger
- Tectaria dolichosora Copel.
- Tectaria dressleri A.Rojas
- Tectaria durvillei (Bory) Holttum
- Tectaria ebenina (C.Chr.) Ching
- Tectaria elata (Holttum) Li Bing Zhang & X.Zhang
- Tectaria estremerana Proctor & A.M.Evans
- Tectaria exauriculata Holttum
- Tectaria faberiana Rojas
- Tectaria fauriei Tagawa
- Tectaria fernandensis (Baker) C.Chr.
- Tectaria ferruginea (Mett.) Copel.
- Tectaria filisquamata Holttum
- Tectaria fimbriata (Willd.) Proctor & Lourteig
- Tectaria fissa (Kunze) Holttum
- Tectaria fuscipes (Wall.) C.Chr.
- Tectaria gaudichaudii (Mett.) Maxon
- Tectaria gemmifera (Fée) Alston
- Tectaria gigantea (Blume) Copel.
- Tectaria godeffroyi (Luerss.) Copel.
- Tectaria griffithii (Baker) C.Chr.
- Tectaria grossedentata Ching & Chu H.Wang
- Tectaria guachana Rusea
- Tectaria gurupahensis (C.Chr. ex Kjellb. & C.Chr.) comb. ined.
- Tectaria harlandii (Hook.) C.M.Kuo
- Tectaria hennipmanii (Tagawa & K.Iwats.) S.Y.Dong
- Tectaria heracleifolia (Willd.) Underw.
- Tectaria herpetocaulos Holttum
- Tectaria heterocarpa (Bedd.) C.V.Morton
- Tectaria hilocarpa (Fée) M.G.Price
- Tectaria hollrungii (Kuhn) Li Bing Zhang & X.Zhang
- Tectaria holttumii C.Chr.
- Tectaria × hongkongensis S.Y.Dong
- Tectaria hookeri Brownlie
- Tectaria humbertiana Tardieu
- Tectaria hymenodes (Mett. ex Kuhn) J.W.Moore
- Tectaria hymenophylla (Bedd.) Holttum
- Tectaria impressa (Fée) Holttum
- Tectaria incisa Cav.
- Tectaria incisa Cav. f. vivipara (Jenman) C.V.Morton
- Tectaria ingens (Atk. ex C.B.Clarke) Holttum
- Tectaria inopinata Holttum
- Tectaria isomorpha Holttum
- Tectaria jacobsii Holttum
- Tectaria jardini (Mett.) E.D.Br.
- Tectaria jermyi S.Y.Dong
- Tectaria jimenezii M.Kessler & A.R.Sm.
- Tectaria johannis-winkleri (C.Chr.) C.Chr.
- Tectaria kalimantanensis S.Y.Dong
- Tectaria katoi (Holttum) C.W.Chen & C.J.Rothf.
- Tectaria keckii (Luerss.) C.Chr.
- Tectaria kehdingiana (Kuhn ex Luerss.) M.G.Price
- Tectaria kingii Copel.
- Tectaria kouniensis Brownlie
- Tectaria kusukusensis (Hayata) Lellinger
- Tectaria labrusca (Hook.) Copel.
- Tectaria lacei Holttum
- Tectaria lacinifolia A.Rojas & D.Sanín
- Tectaria laotica Tardieu & C.Chr.
- Tectaria latifolia (G.Forst.) Copel.
- Tectaria lawrenceana (Moore) C.Chr.
- Tectaria laxa (Copel.) M.G.Price
- Tectaria leptophylla (C.H.Wright) Ching
- Tectaria lifuensis (E.Fourn.) C.Chr.
- Tectaria lizarzaburui (Sodiro) C.Chr.
- Tectaria lobbii (Hook.) Copel.
- Tectaria lobulata (Blume) K.Iwats. & M.Kato
- Tectaria lombokensis Holttum
- Tectaria longipinnata A.Rojas
- Tectaria luchunensis S.K.Wu
- Tectaria macleanii (Copel.) S.Y.Dong
- Tectaria macrosora (Baker) C.Chr.
- Tectaria macrota Holttum
- Tectaria madagascarica Tardieu
- Tectaria magnifica (Bonap.) C.Chr.
- Tectaria manilensis (C.Presl) Holttum
- Tectaria marchionica E.D.Br.
- Tectaria media Ching
- Tectaria melanocauloides M.Kato
- Tectaria melanocaulos (Blume) Copel.
- Tectaria melanorachis (Baker) Copel.
- Tectaria membranacea (Hook.) Fraser-Jenk. & Kholia
- Tectaria mesodon (Copel.) M.G.Price
- Tectaria mexicana (Fée) C.V.Morton
- Tectaria × michleriana (D.C.Eaton) Lellinger
- Tectaria microchlamys Holttum
- Tectaria microlepis Holttum
- Tectaria microsora A.R.Sm.
- Tectaria mindanaensis (Holttum) C.W.Chen & C.J.Rothf.
- Tectaria minuta Copel.
- Tectaria moorei (Hook.) C.Chr.
- Tectaria moranii Li Bing Zhang & G.D.Tang
- Tectaria morlae (Sodiro) C.Chr.
- Tectaria morsei (Baker) P.J.Edwards ex S.Y.Dong
- Tectaria moussetii Holttum
- Tectaria multicaudata (C.B.Clarke) Ching
- Tectaria murilloana A.Rojas
- Tectaria murrayi (Baker) C.Chr.
- Tectaria nabirensis Holttum
- Tectaria nausoriensis Brownlie
- Tectaria nayarii Mazumdar
- Tectaria nebulosa (Baker) C.Chr.
- Tectaria nicaraguensis (E.Fourn.) C.Chr.
- Tectaria nitens Copel.
- Tectaria novoguineensis (Rosenst.) C.Chr.
- Tectaria orbicularis Jermy & T.G.Walker
- Tectaria organensis C.Chr.
- Tectaria palmata (Mett.) Copel.
- Tectaria panamensis (Hook.) R.M.Tryon & A.F.Tryon
- Tectaria pandurifolia (C.Chr.) C.Chr.
- Tectaria paradoxa (Fée) Sledge
- Tectaria pardalina A.Rojas
- Tectaria pascoensis A.Rojas
- Tectaria pedata (Desv.) R.M.Tryon & A.F.Tryon
- Tectaria pentagonalis (Bonap.) comb. ined.
- Tectaria perdimorpha Holttum
- Tectaria phaeocaulis (Rosenst.) C.Chr.
- Tectaria phanomensis S.Linds.
- Tectaria pica (L. fil.) C.Chr.
- Tectaria pilosa (Fée) R.C.Moran
- Tectaria pinnata (C.Chr.) R.M.Tryon & A.F.Tryon
- Tectaria pleiosora (Alderw.) C.Chr.
- Tectaria pleiotoma (Baker) C.Chr.
- Tectaria pluriseriata (Holttum) S.Y.Dong
- Tectaria poeppigii (C.Presl) C.Chr.
- Tectaria poilanei Tardieu
- Tectaria polymorpha (Wall. ex Hook.) Copel.
- Tectaria prolifera (Hook. & Grev.)) R.M.Tryon & A.F.Tryon
- Tectaria pseudosiifolia Fraser-Jenk. & Wangdi
- Tectaria pseudosinuata Brownlie
- Tectaria psomiocarpa S.Y.Dong
- Tectaria × pteropus-minor (Bedd.) Fraser-Jenk.
- Tectaria pubens R.C.Moran
- Tectaria puberula (Desv.) C.Chr.
- Tectaria pubescens Copel.
- Tectaria pulchra (Copel.) C.W.Chen & C.J.Rothf.
- Tectaria quinquefida (Baker) Ching
- Tectaria quitensis (C.Chr.) C.Chr.
- Tectaria ramosii (Copel.) Holttum
- Tectaria rara (Alderw.) C.Chr.
- Tectaria remotipinna Ching & Chu H.Wang
- Tectaria repanda (Willd.) Holttum
- Tectaria rheophytica Holttum
- Tectaria rigida Holttum
- Tectaria rivalis (Mett. ex Kuhn) Maxon
- Tectaria rockii C.Chr.
- Tectaria rufescens Holttum
- Tectaria rufovillosa (Rosenst.) C.Chr.
- Tectaria sabahensis C.W.Chen & C.J.Rothf.
- Tectaria sagenioides (Mett.) Christenh.
- Tectaria samariana S.Y.Dong
- Tectaria schmutzii Holttum
- Tectaria schultzei (Brause) C.Chr.
- Tectaria seemannii (E.Fourn.) Copel.
- Tectaria semibipinnata (Wall. ex Hook.) Copel.
- Tectaria semipinnata (Roxb.) C.V.Morton
- Tectaria seramensis M.Kato
- Tectaria setulosa (Baker) Holttum
- Tectaria shahidaniana Rusea
- Tectaria siifolia (Willd.) Copel.
- Tectaria simonsii (Baker) Ching
- Tectaria singaporeana (Wall. ex Hook. & Grev.) Copel.
- Tectaria sinuata (Labill.) C.Chr.
- Tectaria solomonensis Holttum
- Tectaria squamipes Holttum
- Tectaria squamosa Riv.-Giró & C.Sánchez
- Tectaria stalactica M.G.Price
- Tectaria stearnsii Maxon
- Tectaria stenosemioides (Alderw.) C.Chr.
- Tectaria subaequalis (Rosenst.) Copel.
- Tectaria subcaudata (Alderw.) C.Chr.
- Tectaria subconfluens (Bedd.) Ching
- Tectaria subcordata Holttum
- Tectaria subdigitata (Baker) Copel.
- Tectaria subdimorpha A.Rojas
- Tectaria subebenea (Christ) C.Chr.
- Tectaria subfuscipes (Tagawa) C.M.Kuo
- Tectaria subglabrata (Holttum) S.Y.Dong
- Tectaria subrepanda (Baker) C.Chr.
- Tectaria subsageniacea (Christ) Christenh.
- Tectaria subtriloba Holttum
- Tectaria subtriphylla (Hook. & Arn.) Copel.
- Tectaria sulitii Copel.
- Tectaria suluensis Holttum
- Tectaria sumatrana (C.Chr.) C.Chr.
- Tectaria tabonensis M.G.Price
- Tectaria taccifolia (Fée) M.G.Price
- Tectaria tahitensis Maxon
- Tectaria tenerifrons (Hook.) Ching
- Tectaria tenuifolia (Mett.) Maxon
- Tectaria teratocarpa (Alderw.) C.Chr.
- Tectaria teysmanniana (Baker) S.Y.Dong
- Tectaria thwaitesii (Bedd.) Ching
- Tectaria torrisiana Shaffer-Fehre
- Tectaria transiens (C.V.Morton) A.R.Sm.
- Tectaria translucens Holttum
- Tectaria trichodes (C.V.Morton) A.R.Sm.
- Tectaria trichotoma (Fée) Tagawa
- Tectaria tricuspis (Bedd.) Copel.
- Tectaria trifida (Fée) M.G.Price
- Tectaria trifoliata (L.) Cav.
- Tectaria triglossa Tardieu & C.Chr.
- Tectaria triloba (Sodiro) C.Chr.
- Tectaria trimenii (Bedd.) C.Chr.
- Tectaria trinitensis Maxon
- Tectaria tripartita (Baker) Copel.
- Tectaria vasta (Blume) Copel.
- Tectaria vieillardii (E.Fourn.) C.Chr.
- Tectaria villosa Holttum
- Tectaria vitiensis Brownlie
- Tectaria waterlotii (Tardieu) J.P.Roux
- Tectaria weberi Copel.
- Tectaria wenzelii (Copel.) S.Y.Dong
- Tectaria wightii (C.B.Clarke) Ching
- Tectaria wigmanii (Racib.) S.Y.Dong
- Tectaria zeilanica (Houtt.) Sledge
- Tectaria zippelii S.Y.Dong
- Tectaria zollingeri (Kurz) Holttum
