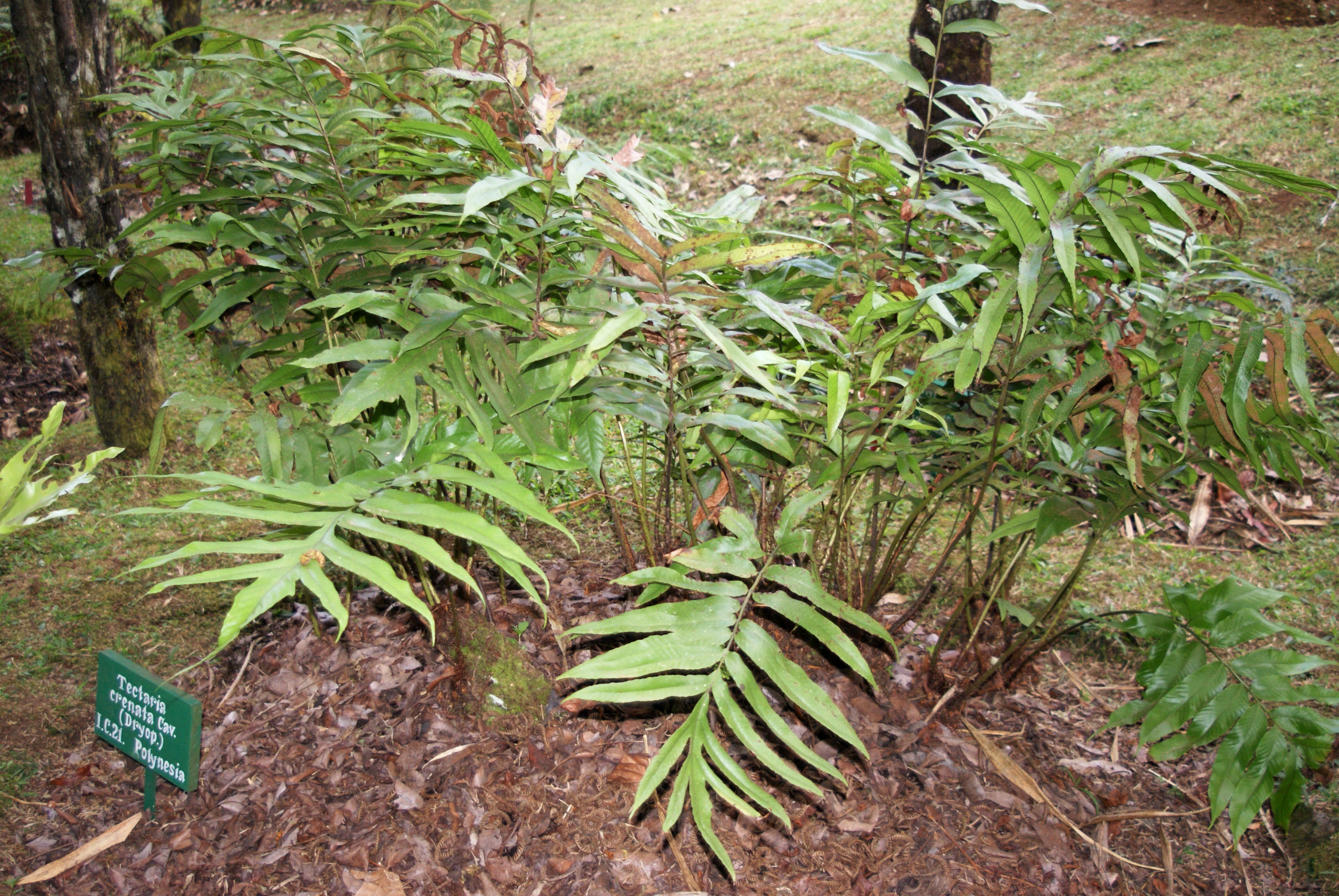
- Tectaria crenata

Scientific classification
- Kingdom: Plantae
- Clade: Tracheophytes
- Division: Polypodiophyta
- Class: Polypodiopsida
- Order: Polypodiales
- Suborder: Polypodiineae
- Family: Tectariaceae; Panigrahi

Genera
- See text.

Synonyms
- Aspidiaceae Baker, nom. ill.; Arthropteridaceae Liu, Hovenkamp & Schneider; Dictyoxiphiaceae Ching, nom. inv.; Hypoderriaceae Ching, nom. inv.

= Tectariaceae =

Family of ferns

Tectariaceae is a family of leptosporangiate ferns in the order Polypodiales. In the Pteridophyte Phylogeny Group classification of 2016 (PPG I), the family is placed in the suborder Polypodiineae. Alternatively, it may be treated as the subfamily Tectarioideae of a very broadly defined family Polypodiaceae sensu lato. The family comprises seven genera, of which Tectaria is by far the largest.

== Taxonomy ==
In 1990, Karl U. Kramer and coauthors treated Pleocnemia and 7 of the currently recognized genera as a subfamily of Dryopteridaceae. Two other genera, Arthropteris and Psammiosorus, along with Oleandra, constituted Kramer's Oleandraceae. It is now known that Kramer's version of Dryopteridaceae is polyphyletic. Arthropteris (including Psammiosorus) lies within Tectariaceae and Tectariaceae is sister to a clade consisting of Oleandraceae, Davalliaceae, and Polypodiaceae. In 2006, in a revision of fern classification, Tectariaceae was an accepted family. In 2007, a molecular phylogenetic study of Dryopteridaceae included Pleocnemia and showed that it belongs in Dryopteridaceae. Also in 2007, Dracoglossum was named as a new genus. It has since been removed to Lomariopsidaceae.

=== Phylogeny ===
In 2016, a cladistic analysis of Tectariaceae separated two new genera, Draconopteris and Malaifilix, from Tectaria sensu stricto.

PPG I 2016

- Polypodiineae (eupolypods I)
  - Didymochlaenaceae
  - - Hypodematiaceae
    - - Dryopteridaceae
      - - - Nephrolepidaceae
          - Lomariopsidaceae
        - - Tectariaceae
          - - Oleandraceae
            - - Davalliaceae
              - Polypodiaceae

Zhang et al. 2016

- Tectariaceae
  - - - Malaifilix
      - Draconopteris
    - Pteridrys
  - - Arthropteris
    - - - Hypoderris
        - Triplophyllum
      - Tectaria

Fern Tree of Life

- Tectariaceae
  - Arthropteris
  - - - - Draconopteris
        - Malaifilix
      - - Polydictyum
        - Pteridrys
    - - - Hypoderris
        - Triplophyllum
      - Tectaria

=== Genera ===
As of November 2019, the Checklist of Ferns and Lycophytes of the World accepted the following genera. Polydictyum was separated from Tectaria after the publication of PPG I in 2016.

- Arthropteris J.Sm.
- Draconopteris Li Bing Zhang & Liang Zhang
- Hypoderris R.Br.
- Malaifilix Li Bing Zhang & Schuettp.
- Polydictyum C.Presl
- Pteridrys C.Chr. & Ching
- Tectaria Cav.
- Triplophyllum Holttum
