= List of Microvelia species =

This is a list of 234 species in Microvelia, a genus of smaller water striders in the family Veliidae.

== Microvelia species ==
- Microvelia acantha (Padilla-Gil, 2013)^{i c g}
- Microvelia addisi Poisson, 1949^{i c g}
- Microvelia adrienneae Poisson, 1942^{i c g}
- Microvelia albolineolata Torre-Bueno, 1927^{i c g}
- Microvelia albomaculata Distant, 1909^{i c g}
- Microvelia albonotata Champion, 1898^{i c g}
- Microvelia alisonae Andersen and Weir, 2003^{i c g}
- Microvelia americana (Uhler, 1884)^{i c g b}
- Microvelia ancona Drake and Chapman, 1954^{i c g}
- Microvelia andringitrae Poisson, 1952^{i c g}
- Microvelia angelesi Andersen and Weir, 2003^{i c g}
- Microvelia angolensis Hoberlandt, 1951^{i c g}
- Microvelia ankavandrae Poisson, 1952^{i c g}
- Microvelia annandalei Distant, 1909^{i c g}
- Microvelia annemarieae Andersen and Weir, 2003^{i c g}
- Microvelia apunctata Andersen and Weir, 2003^{i c g}
- Microvelia arabica Brown, 1951^{i c g}
- Microvelia arca Drake, 1958^{i c g}
- Microvelia argentata Nieser and Alkins-Koo, 1991^{i c g}
- Microvelia argusta Drake and Maldonado-Capriles, 1954^{i c g}
- Microvelia arussii Poisson, 1955^{i c g}
- Microvelia aschnakiranae Makhan, 2014^{i c g}
- Microvelia ashlocki J. Polhemus, 1968^{i c g}
- Microvelia atrata Torre-Bueno, 1916^{i c g}
- Microvelia atroelegans Zettel and Gapud, 1999^{i c g}
- Microvelia atromaculata Paiva, 1919^{i c g}
- Microvelia australiensis Andersen and Weir, 2003^{i c g}
- Microvelia austrina Torre-Bueno, 1924^{i c g}
- Microvelia awasai Poisson, 1951^{i c g}
- Microvelia ayacuchana Drake and Maldonado-Capriles, 1952^{i c g}
- Microvelia ayos Linnavuori, 1977^{i c g}
- Microvelia barbifer Andersen and Weir, 2003^{i c g}
- Microvelia beameri McKinstry, 1937^{i c g}
- Microvelia bossangoa Linnavuori, 1977^{i c g}
- Microvelia bourbonensis Poisson, 1957^{i c g}
- Microvelia braziliensis McKinstry, 1937^{i c g}
- Microvelia briseis Kirkaldy, 1900^{i c g}
- Microvelia buenoi Drake, 1920^{i c g b}
- Microvelia bulckei Poisson, 1957^{i c g}
- Microvelia burmanica Paiva, 1918^{i c g}
- Microvelia californiensis McKinstry, 1937^{i c g}
- Microvelia cameron Andersen, Yang and Zettel, 2002^{i c g}
- Microvelia carinata Linnavuori, 1977^{i c g}
- Microvelia carnarvon Andersen and Weir, 2003^{i c g}
- Microvelia cassisi Andersen and Weir, 2003^{i c g}
- Microvelia cavernula J. Polhemus, 1972^{i c g}
- Microvelia cavicola J. Polhemus, 1999^{i c g}
- Microvelia cerifera McKinstry, 1937^{i c g}
- Microvelia chanita J. Polhemus and Hogue, 1972^{i c g}
- Microvelia childi Andersen, 1969^{i c g}
- Microvelia chilena Drake and Hussey, 1955^{i c g}
- Microvelia cinchonana Drake and Hussey, 1954^{i c g}
- Microvelia circumcincta Champion, 1898^{i c g}
- Microvelia costaiana Drake and Hussey, 1951^{i c g}
- Microvelia crassipes Lundblad, 1933^{i c g}
- Microvelia crinata Drake, 1951^{i c g}
- Microvelia cubana Drake, 1951^{i c g}
- Microvelia dalawa Zettel, 2014^{i c g}
- Microvelia depressa J. Polhemus, 1974^{i c g}
- Microvelia distanti Lundblad, 1933^{i c g}
- Microvelia distincta Malipatil, 1980^{i c g}
- Microvelia douglasi Scott, 1874^{i c g}
- Microvelia duidana Drake and Maldonado-Capriles, 1952^{i c g}
- Microvelia eborensis Andersen and Weir, 2003^{i c g}
- Microvelia electra Andersen, 2001^{i c g}
- Microvelia falcifer Andersen and Weir, 2003^{i c g}
- Microvelia fanera (Padilla-Gil, 2013)^{i c g}
- Microvelia fasciculifera McKinstry, 1937^{i c g}
- Microvelia flavipes Champion, 1898^{i c g}
- Microvelia fluvialis Malipatil, 1980^{i c g}
- Microvelia fontinalis Torre-Bueno, 1916^{i c g}
- Microvelia fosoana Linnavuori, 1977^{i c g}
- Microvelia gapudi Zettel, 2012^{i c g}
- Microvelia genitalis Lundblad, 1933^{i c g}
- Microvelia gerhardi Hussey, 1924^{i c g}
- Microvelia gestroi Kirkaldy, 1901^{i c g}
- Microvelia glabrosulcata J. Polhemus, 1974^{i c g}
- Microvelia gracillima Reuter, 1883^{i c g}
- Microvelia grimaldii Andersen, 2001^{i c g}
- Microvelia hambletoni Drake, 1951^{i c g}
- Microvelia herberti Andersen and Weir, 2003^{i c g}
- Microvelia hidalgoi McKinstry, 1937^{i c g}
- Microvelia hinei Drake, 1920^{i c g}
- Microvelia horvathi Lundblad, 1933^{i c g}
- Microvelia hozari Hoberlandt, 1948^{i c g}
- Microvelia hungerfordi McKinstry, 1937^{i c g}
- Microvelia hynesi Poisson, 1949^{i c g}
- Microvelia hypipamee Andersen and Weir, 2003^{i c g}
- Microvelia inannana Drake and Hottes, 1952^{i c g}
- Microvelia inguapi Padilla-Gil and Moreira, 2013^{i c g}
- Microvelia inquilina J. Polhemus and Hogue, 1972^{i c g}
- Microvelia insignis (Distant, 1903)^{i c g}
- Microvelia intonsa Drake, 1951^{i c g}
- Microvelia ioana Drake and Hottes, 1952^{i c g}
- Microvelia irrasa Drake and Harris, 1928^{i c g}
- Microvelia isa Zettel, 2012^{i c g}
- Microvelia isabelae Bachmann, 1979^{i c g}
- Microvelia itremoi Poisson, 1952^{i c g}
- Microvelia jaechi Zettel and Gapud, 1999^{i c g}
- Microvelia japonica Esaki and Miyamoto, 1955^{i c g}
- Microvelia javadiensis Thirumalai, 1989^{i c g}
- Microvelia justi Andersen and Weir, 2003^{i c g}
- Microvelia kakadu Andersen and Weir, 2003^{i c g}
- Microvelia kamassanguensis Hoberlandt, 1951^{i c g}
- Microvelia karunaratnei J. Polhemus, 1999^{i c g}
- Microvelia kijabiensis Poisson, 1941^{i c g}
- Microvelia kipopoella Linnavuori, 1973^{i c g}
- Microvelia kyushuensis Esaki and Miyamoto, 1955^{i c g}
- Microvelia laesslei Drake and Hussey, 1954^{i c g}
- Microvelia lakatomivolae Poisson, 1957^{i c g}
- Microvelia leavipleura J. Polhemus, 1974^{i c g}
- Microvelia legorskyi Zettel, 2012^{i c g}
- Microvelia leptotmema Nieser and Alkins-Koo, 1991^{i c g}
- Microvelia leucothea J. Polhemus and Manzano, 1992^{i c g}
- Microvelia leveillei (Lethierry, 1877)^{i c g}
- Microvelia lilliput Andersen and Weir, 2003^{i c g}
- Microvelia limaiana Drake, 1951^{i c g}
- Microvelia lineatipes Paiva, 1919^{i c g}
- Microvelia lokobei Poisson, 1951^{i c g}
- Microvelia longicornis Torre-Bueno, 1925^{i c g}
- Microvelia longipes Uhler, 1894^{i c g}
- Microvelia loriae Kirkaldy, 1901^{i c g}
- Microvelia lujanana Drake, 1951^{i c g}
- Microvelia lundbladi Y. C. Gupta and Khandelwal, 2002^{i c g}
- Microvelia macani Brown, 1953^{i c g}
- Microvelia macgregori (Kirkaldy, 1899)^{i c g}
- Microvelia magnifica Lundblad, 1933^{i c g}
- Microvelia malipatili Andersen and Weir, 2003^{i c g}
- Microvelia margaretae Andersen and Weir, 2003^{i c g}
- Microvelia marginata Uhler, 1893^{i c g}
- Microvelia maromandiae Poisson, 1951^{i c g}
- Microvelia mbanga Linnavuori, 1977^{i c g}
- Microvelia milleri Andersen and Weir, 2003^{i c g}
- Microvelia mimula White, 1879^{i c g}
- Microvelia minima Drake, 1952^{i c g}
- Microvelia minutissima Zettel and Tran, 2009^{i c g}
- Microvelia mitohoi Poisson, 1951^{i c g}
- Microvelia miyamoti Y. C. Gupta and Y. K. Gupta, 2008^{i c g}
- Microvelia mjobergi Hale, 1925^{i c g}
- Microvelia monteithi Andersen and Weir, 2003^{i c g}
- Microvelia morimotoi Miyamoto, 1964^{i c g}
- Microvelia mossman Andersen and Weir, 2003^{i c g}
- Microvelia munda Drake, 1951^{i c g}
- Microvelia myorensis Andersen and Weir, 2003^{i c g}
- Microvelia negusi Poisson, 1955^{i c g}
- Microvelia nelsoni Moreira, Barbosa and Ribeiro, 2012^{i c g}
- Microvelia nessimiani Moreira and Rúdio in Rúdio and Moreira, 2011^{i c g}
- Microvelia niangbo Linnavuori, 1977^{i c g}
- Microvelia noeli Poisson, 1951^{i c g}
- Microvelia novana Drake and Plaumann, 1955^{i c g}
- Microvelia oaxacana Drake, 1951^{i c g}
- Microvelia oceanica Distant, 1914^{i c g}
- Microvelia odontogaster Andersen and Weir, 2003^{i c g}
- Microvelia oraria Drake, 1952^{i c g}
- Microvelia pacifica Kirkaldy, 1908^{i c g}
- Microvelia paludicola Champion, 1898^{i c g}
- Microvelia panamensis Champion, 1898^{i c g}
- Microvelia parallela Blatchley, 1925^{i c g}
- Microvelia paramega Andersen and Weir, 2003^{i c g}
- Microvelia parana Drake and Carvalho, 1954^{i c g}
- Microvelia pauliani Poisson, 1951^{i c g}
- Microvelia paura J. Polhemus, 1974^{i c g}
- Microvelia pennicilla Andersen and Weir, 2003^{i c g}
- Microvelia peramoena Hale, 1925^{i c g}
- Microvelia pererai J. Polhemus, 1979^{i c g}
- Microvelia peruviensis McKinstry, 1937^{i c g}
- Microvelia petraea Andersen, Yang and Zettel, 2002^{i c g}
- Microvelia pexa Drake and Hussey, 1951^{i c g}
- Microvelia picinguaba Moreira and Barbosa, 2011^{i c g}
- Microvelia piedrancha Padilla-Gil and Moreira, 2013^{i c g}
- Microvelia plumbea Lundblad, 1933^{i c g}
- Microvelia polhemi Andersen, 2000^{i c g}
- Microvelia popovi Brown, 1951^{i c g}
- Microvelia portoricensis Drake, 1951^{i c g}
- Microvelia potama Drake, 1958^{i c g}
- Microvelia prompta Cheesman, 1926^{i c g}
- Microvelia pronotalis (Distant, 1913)^{i c g}
- Microvelia pseudomarginata Nieser and Alkins-Koo, 1991^{i c g}
- Microvelia psilonota J. Polhemus, 1974^{i c g}
- Microvelia pudoris Drake and Harris, 1936^{i c g}
- Microvelia pueblana Drake and Hottes, 1952^{i c g}
- Microvelia pulchella Westwood, 1834^{i c g b}
- Microvelia pygmaea (Dufour, 1833)^{i c g}
- Microvelia queenslandiae Andersen and Weir, 2003^{i c g}
- Microvelia quieta Drake and Carvalho, 1954^{i c g}
- Microvelia rasilis Drake, 1951^{i c g}
- Microvelia recifana Drake, 1951^{i c g}
- Microvelia reflexa J. Polhemus, 1974^{i c g}
- Microvelia rennellensis Brown, 1968^{i c g}
- Microvelia reticulata (Burmeister, 1835)^{i c g}
- Microvelia rishwani Makhan, 2014^{i c g}
- Microvelia rouwenzoriana Poisson, 1941^{i c g}
- Microvelia royi Poisson, 1954^{i c g}
- Microvelia rufescens Champion, 1898^{i c g}
- Microvelia sambiranoi Poisson, 1951^{i c g}
- Microvelia santala Hafiz and Ribeiro, 1939^{i c g}
- Microvelia sarpta Drake and Harris, 1936^{i c g}
- Microvelia schmidti McKinstry, 1937^{i c g}
- Microvelia setipes Champion, 1898^{i c g}
- Microvelia seyferti Zettel, 2014^{i c g}
- Microvelia signata Uhler, 1894^{i c g}
- Microvelia silvestris Hoberlandt, 1951^{i c g}
- Microvelia somnokrene Zettel and Gapud, 1999^{i c g}
- Microvelia spurgeon Andersen and Weir, 2003^{i c g}
- Microvelia starmuehlneri J. Polhemus and Herring, 1970^{i c g}
- Microvelia stellata Kirkaldy, 1902^{i c g}
- Microvelia summersi Drake and Harris, 1928^{i c g}
- Microvelia takiyae Moreira, Barbosa and Ribeiro, 2012^{i c g}
- Microvelia tasmaniensis Andersen and Weir, 2003^{i c g}
- Microvelia tateiana Drake, 1951^{i c g}
- Microvelia timida Drake and Roze, 1958^{i c g}
- Microvelia torquata Champion, 1898^{i c g}
- Microvelia torresiana Andersen and Weir, 2003^{i c g}
- Microvelia trichota Nieser and Chen, 2005^{i c g}
- Microvelia trinitatis China, 1943^{i c g}
- Microvelia tsaratananae Poisson, 1952^{i c g}
- Microvelia tshingandana Linnavuori and Weber, 1974^{i c g}
- Microvelia tuberculata Andersen and Weir, 2003^{i c g}
- Microvelia ubatuba Moreira and Barbosa, 2011^{i c g}
- Microvelia uenoi Miyamoto, 1964^{i c g}
- Microvelia undata Poisson, 1964^{i c g}
- Microvelia urucara Moreira, Barbosa and Nessimian, 2011^{i c g}
- Microvelia urundii Poisson, 1955^{i c g}
- Microvelia vagans White, 1878^{i c g}
- Microvelia ventrospinosa Andersen and Weir, 2003^{i c g}
- Microvelia venustatis Drake and Harris, 1933^{i c g}
- Microvelia venustissima Poisson, 1941^{i c g}
- Microvelia verana Drake and Hottes, 1952^{i c g}
- Microvelia vilhenai Hoberlandt, 1951^{i c g}
- Microvelia villosula Torre-Bueno, 1927^{i c g}
- Microvelia waelbroecki Kirkaldy, 1900^{i c g}
- Microvelia wala Zettel, 2012^{i c g}
- Microvelia woodwardi Andersen and Weir, 2003^{i c g}
- Microvelia zillana Drake and Hottes, 1952^{i c g}

Data sources: i = ITIS, c = Catalogue of Life, g = GBIF, b = Bugguide.net
