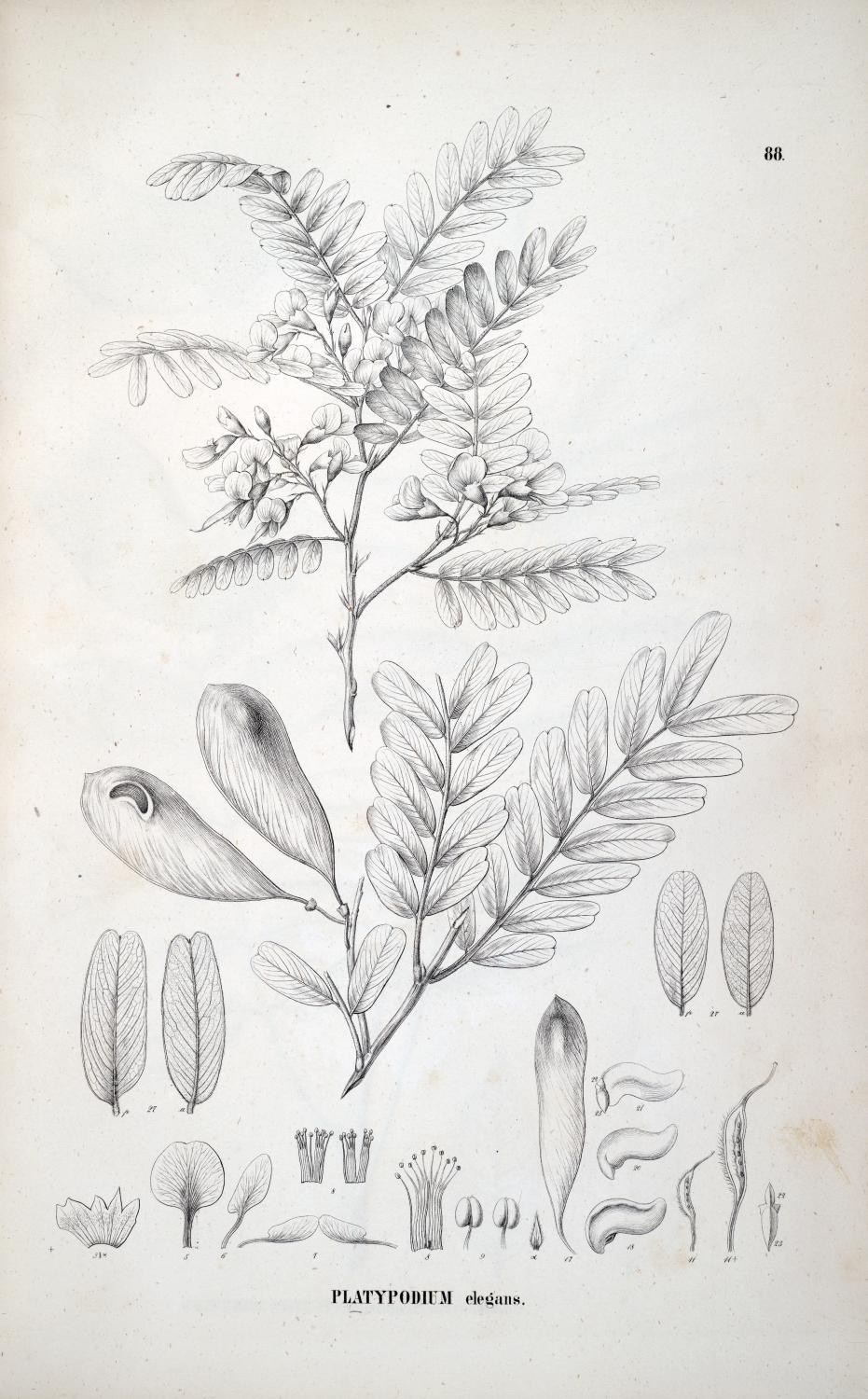
- An illustration of Platypodium elegans from the Flora Brasiliensis

Scientific classification
- Kingdom: Plantae
- Clade: Embryophytes
- Clade: Tracheophytes
- Clade: Spermatophytes
- Clade: Angiosperms
- Clade: Eudicots
- Clade: Rosids
- Order: Fabales
- Family: Fabaceae
- Subfamily: Faboideae
- Genus: Platypodium
- Species: P. elegans

Binomial name
- Platypodium elegans Vogel 1837

Synonyms
- Callisemaea elegans (Vogel) Walp.; Platypodium maxonianum Pittier

= Platypodium elegans =

Species of legume

Platypodium elegans, the graceful platypodium, is a large leguminous tree found in the Neotropics that forms part of the forest canopy. It was first described by Julius Rudolph Theodor Vogel in 1837 and is the type species of the genus. The tree has been known to grow up to 30 metres in height and have a trunk with a diameter up to 1 m at breast height. Its trunk has large holes in it, sometimes making it possible to see through the trunk. The holes provide a habitat for giant damselflies and other insects both when alive and once the tree has died and fallen over. It has compound leaves each of which is made up of 10–20 leaflets. Three new chemical compounds have been isolated from the leaves and they form part of the diet of several monkeys and the squirrel Sciurus ingrami. In Panama it flowers from April to June, the flowers contain only four ovules, but normally only one of these reaches maturity forming a winged seed pod around 10 cm long and weighing 2 g. During the dry season around a year after the flowers are fertilised, the seeds are dispersed by the wind and the tree loses it leaves. The seeds are eaten by agoutis and by bruchid beetle larvae. The majority of seedlings are killed by damping off fungi in the first few months of growth, with seedlings that grow nearer the parent trees being more likely to die. The seedlings are relatively unable to survive in deep shade compared to other species in the same habitat. Various epiphytes are known to grow on P. elegans with the cactus Epiphyllum phyllanthus being the most abundant in Panama. Despite having holes in its trunk which should encourage debris and seeds to collect, hemiepiphytes are relatively uncommon, meaning that animals are not attracted to it to feed and then defecate. It has no known uses in traditional medicine and although it can be used for timber, the wood is of poor quality.

== Description ==
Platypodium elegans is a large forest tree, which forms part of the forest canopy. It can grow up to 30 m in height, with mature trees having an average crown diameter of 16 m and a diameter at breast height (dbh) of 75–100 cm. Trees over 20 cm dbh grow at a rate of around 0.5 cm per year, as measured by how their dbh increases. Its trunk is fenestrated, having large and conspicuous holes in it, even so much so that it is possible to see through the trunk, meaning it can be mistaken for a strangler fig. The bark is soft and dark brown and contains a foul-smelling sap. It has compound leaves which grow up to 25 cm in length, each having 10–20 leaflets, which are 2.5–7.5 cm long, 1–3 cm wide, hairless on the upper side and positioned not quite opposite each other. Three new compounds have been isolated from the leaves of P. elegans; two seco-lupane triterpenes (canaric acid and dihydrocanaric acid), as well as a coumarin, 6,7,8-trimethoxycoumarin. The mature leaves are relatively tough, requiring more than 100 g/mm^{2} to be applied to them to puncture them. It is deciduous, losing its leaves during the dry season, when its seeds are dispersed. The diameter of the conducting vessels in the roots are on average 69 μm, up to 98 μm and in the shoots 57 μm up to 87 μm. The trees (over 20 cm dbh) are relatively stiff compared to other trees on Barro Colorado Island (BCI), having a Young's modulus of 180,000 kg/cm^{2}.

In Panama, it flowers from April to June. It was first reported to flower only every other year, but this is now known to be incorrect, although seed production can vary considerably from year to year. The flowers of P. elegans contain four ovules, but normally only the most distal ovule develops into a seed, with other seeds being aborted before they mature. The pedicels are 8–12 mm long, the bracts around 2 mm long and the calyx around 4 mm long. After being fertilised a winged fruit (a samara) develops quickly, but it takes around one year for the seed to mature. The fruit remains on the tree whilst the seeds develop and is thought to photosynthesise during this time. The samaras dry out during the dry season, before detaching from the tree and being dispersed by the wind over 2–3 months. In Panama the seeds are dispersed between February and April, just under a year after the flowers formed. Each samara normally only contains one seed, but sometimes they contain two instead, which affects their dispersal. The samaras vary in size and shape between trees, but are generally similar on each individual tree. On average, they weigh around 2 g when dry, and are around 10 cm long but can grow up to 16 cm. Samaras containing two seeds are heavier, have a larger surface area and fall faster from the tree than those containing only one seed. Each seed weighs around one third of a gram, making them relatively large compared to other trees in its habitat, but seeds that are the result of self-fertilisation are significantly lighter (by 0.03 g). The cotyledons, of the seedlings remain underground after germination and only serve as a stored source of nutrients, they detach within 8 weeks of germination.

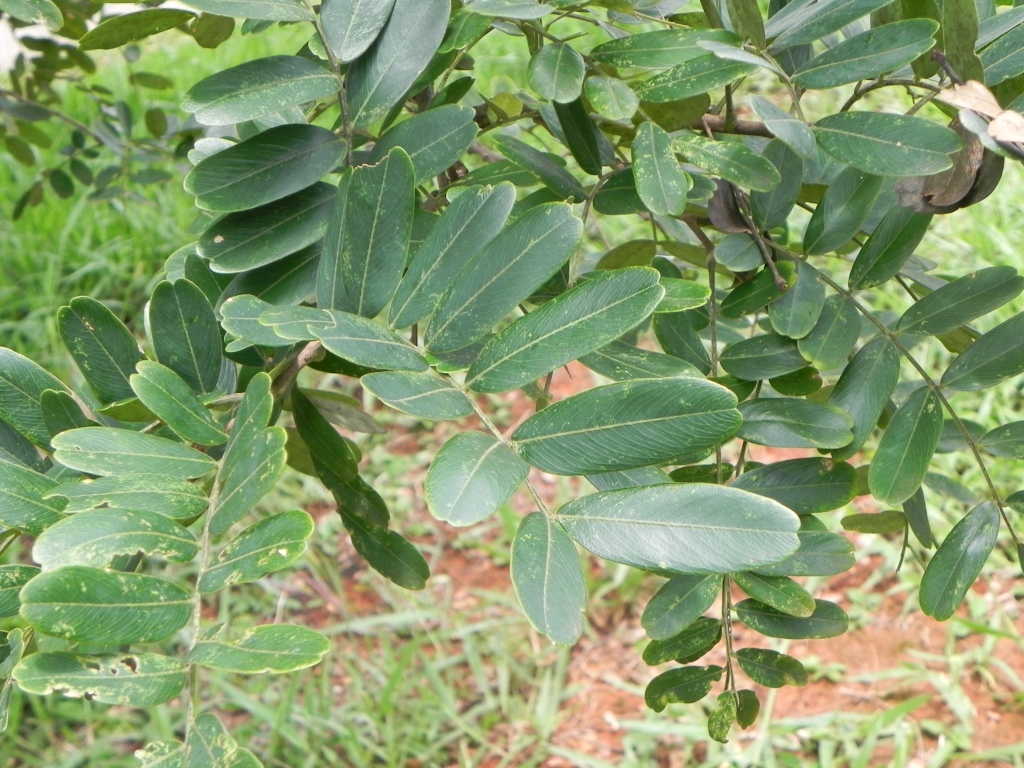
leaves

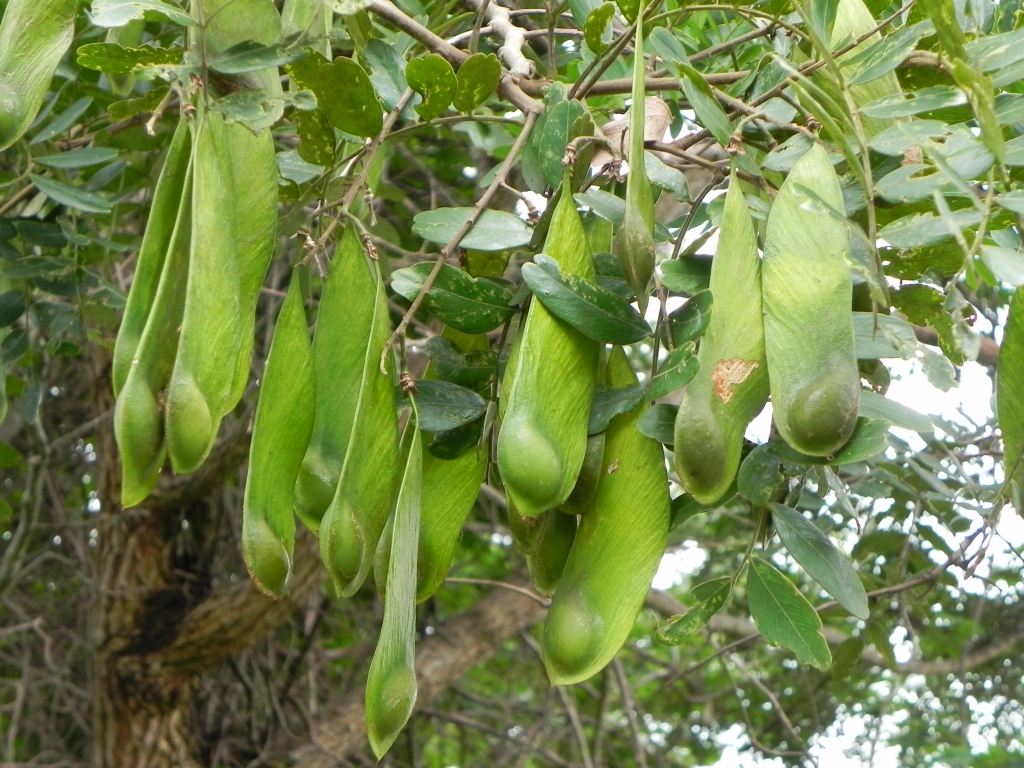
seeds

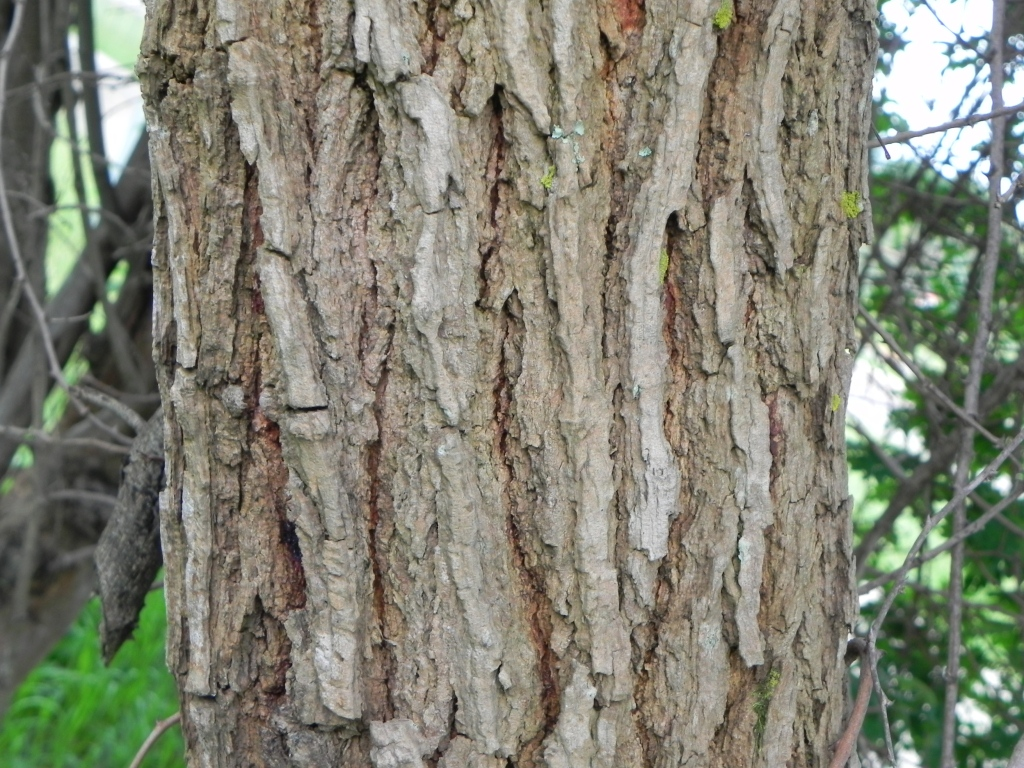
trunk

== Taxonomy ==
Platypodium elegans was first described by Julius Rudolph Theodor Vogel in 1837 and it is the type species of the genus Platypodium. In 1862 George Bentham described a variety, Platypodium elegans var. major. In 1917 Henri François Pittier described Platypodium maxonianum from Chiriquí, Panama, noting that it differed from Vogel's description of P. elegans as it had larger leaves and fruits. He named the species after William Maxon, then a curator of the United States National Herbarium. P. maxonianum is now considered to be a synonym of P. elegans. According to The Plant List, P. elegans is currently one of only two accepted species of Platypodium, the other being P. viride.

== Vernacular names ==
There are many common names for P. elegans in different languages. In English it is known as the graceful platypodium and similarly, in French as platypodium graceiux. In Brazil it has several names: amendoim-do-campo, amendoim-bravo, jacarandá-branco, jacarandá-bana, jacarandá-do-campo, jacarandazinho, jacarandá-tã, faviero, secupiruna and uruvalheira. Several names are also used in Panama: carcuera, costilla, arbol soga, canalua, canaleto and tigre. In Paraguay it is known as desconocido and in Colombia as lomo de caimán.

== Distribution ==
Platypodium elegans is found in the rainforests and savannah of the Neotropics, ranging from Panama in the North, to Paraguay in the South. It is also found in Bolivia, Brazil, Colombia and Venezuela. It is not found in the central and northern parts of Brazil, but is found in the cerrado, Mato Grosso, Minas Gerais and around São Paulo. On Barro Colorado Island (BCI) P. elegans is found at a moderate abundance in both old and young forest, each hectare may contain several mature trees, but it is not unusual to find isolated individuals. Generally, only large individuals are found, with saplings being rare, except in forest gaps.

== Ecology ==
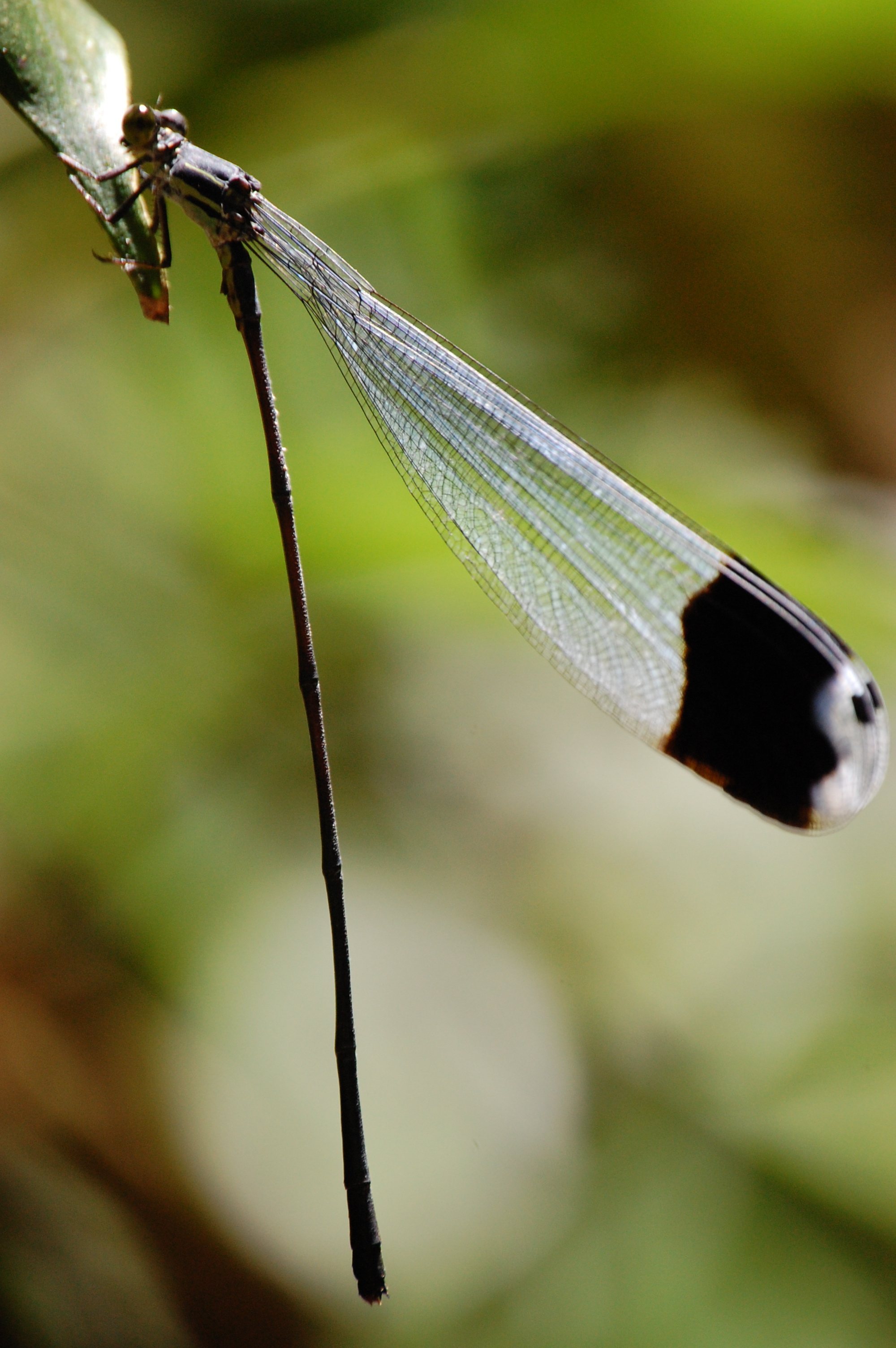
A female Megaloprepus caerulatus, an example of a giant damselfly that breeds in water filled holes in P. elegans

=== Reproduction ===
Platypodium elegans is pollinated by bees. In Panama pollen is moved on average between 368 and 419 m from the parent tree and commonly over 1 km away. The population that regularly share genes (termed the deme) is estimated to be between 25 and 50 hectares around each tree. 92% of seeds that mature result from flowers that have been pollinated with pollen from other individuals but self-fertilisation is actually much higher than this would suggest. The difference between these values is explained by the fact that many fruits are aborted after being fertilised, but before dispersal occurs. Hufford and Hamrick suggested that they abort fruit for two reasons; they could have a set amount of resources to invest in their seeds in one year but produce extra flowers which then compete between each other, with only some surviving to maturity. Alternatively, the tree may detect which fruits are the result of self-fertilisation and selectively abort them, but this is considered less likely. The seeds are dispersed by wind.

In Panama the seeds germinate at the start of the rainy season in May. Damping off fungi account for 64–95% of the deaths of seedlings during their first three months of growth, with deaths being more common for seedlings near their parents, as the Janzen-Connell hypothesis predicts. Falling leaf litter and digging mammals are also significant causes of seedling mortality. An artificial experiment found that if seedlings have their leaves removed or are placed in deep shade (0.08% of full sunlight) they die within 60 days, whereas around 80% of the seedlings of Lacmellea panamensis are able to survive these treatments. The seedlings are able to grow slowly in 0.8% sunlight, but the seedlings are at the low end of the spectrum in terms of being able to tolerate shade. Another experiment has shown that seedlings die faster if either their cotyledons or leaves are removed, those that have had their cotyledons removed die more quickly.

=== Habitat ===
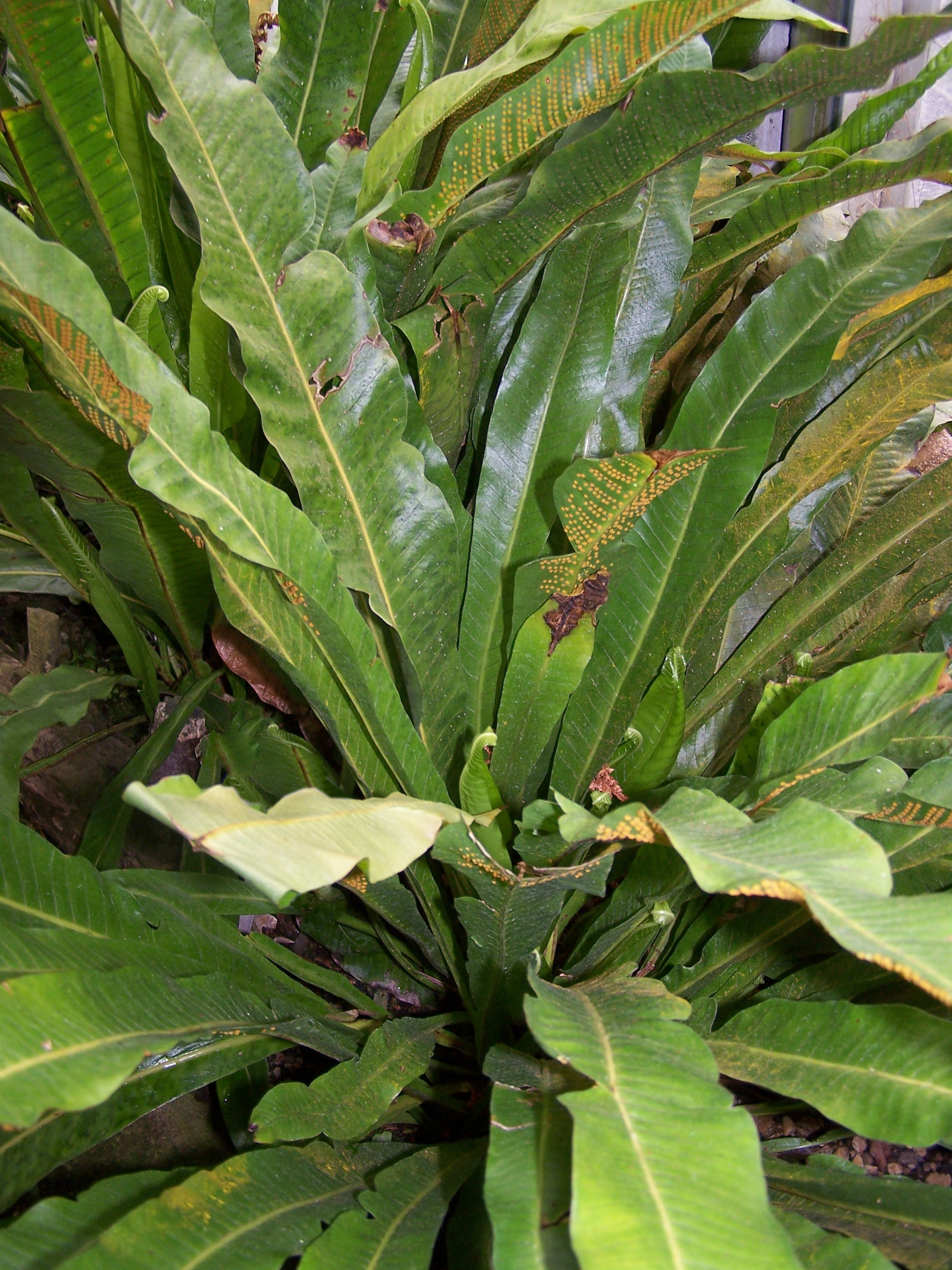
Campyloneurum phyllitidis – a fern that grows on P. elegans

As in all legumes, the roots of P. elegans are colonised by nitrogen fixing bacteria, in this case from the genus Bradyrhizobium. Genetic analysis of the bacteria has shown that different genotypes colonise the roots of the same tree and are strains of Bradyrhizobium japonicum.

The epiphytic cactus Epiphyllum phyllanthus is particularly abundant in the canopies of P. elegans on BCI particularly growing in cavities in the trunk. Another cactus, Rhipsalis baccifera, and the ferns Niphidium crassifolium and Campyloneurum phyllitidis are also found growing on P. elegans. After rainfall, the bark stores around one third of a gram of water per cm^{2} which epiphytes can then absorb, a moderate amount compared to other trees. Todzia found that despite having a trunk with deep invaginations that collect debris and which should encourage the germination of seeds, hemiepiphytes (plants which germinate on the tree and then send down roots into the soil) are relatively rare on P. elegans on BCI. It is thought that this is because its seeds are wind dispersed, and the tree therefore attracts relatively few animals which could deposit the seeds of hemiepiphytes whilst feeding on seeds. Todzia noted that Hura crepitans disperses it seeds explosively, yet is heavily laden with hemiepiphytes however. A survey of 20 trees on BCI with a diameter at breast height of 20 cm or more found that 75% had lianas growing on them.

Various invertebrates live in water-filled holes which form in ridges of the trunk of P. elegans when they die and fall over, and in tree hollows that exist when the tree is alive. Leaf litter collects in the water and as it decomposes animals feed on the debris. An experiment, where leaves of P. elegans were added to an artificial pool containing 650 ml of water in the rainforest, found that 17 species lived in them, with the mosquito Culex mollis being the most abundant. The pools contained a greater species diversity and abundance of animals than similar experiments using leaves of Ceiba pentandra, Dipteryx panamensis and Ficus yoponensis, species that also contain water pools in their trunks. Yanoviak suggested that this indicates that the leaves are a relatively higher-quality nutrient source than those of the other species. On BCI, Fincke found that trees had between 1 and 10 water-filled holes, more than any other tree species investigated, each containing on average 2 litres of water. Yanoviak found that the holes contained only 400 ml of water on average however. The pools are an important habitat for the larvae of giant damselflies. As a coloniser of new habitats, P. elegans may provide an ideal habitat for giant damselflies in secondary forest. The beetle Microvelia cavicola also lives in the water-filled holes, with the type specimen of the species being found in one.

=== Food ===
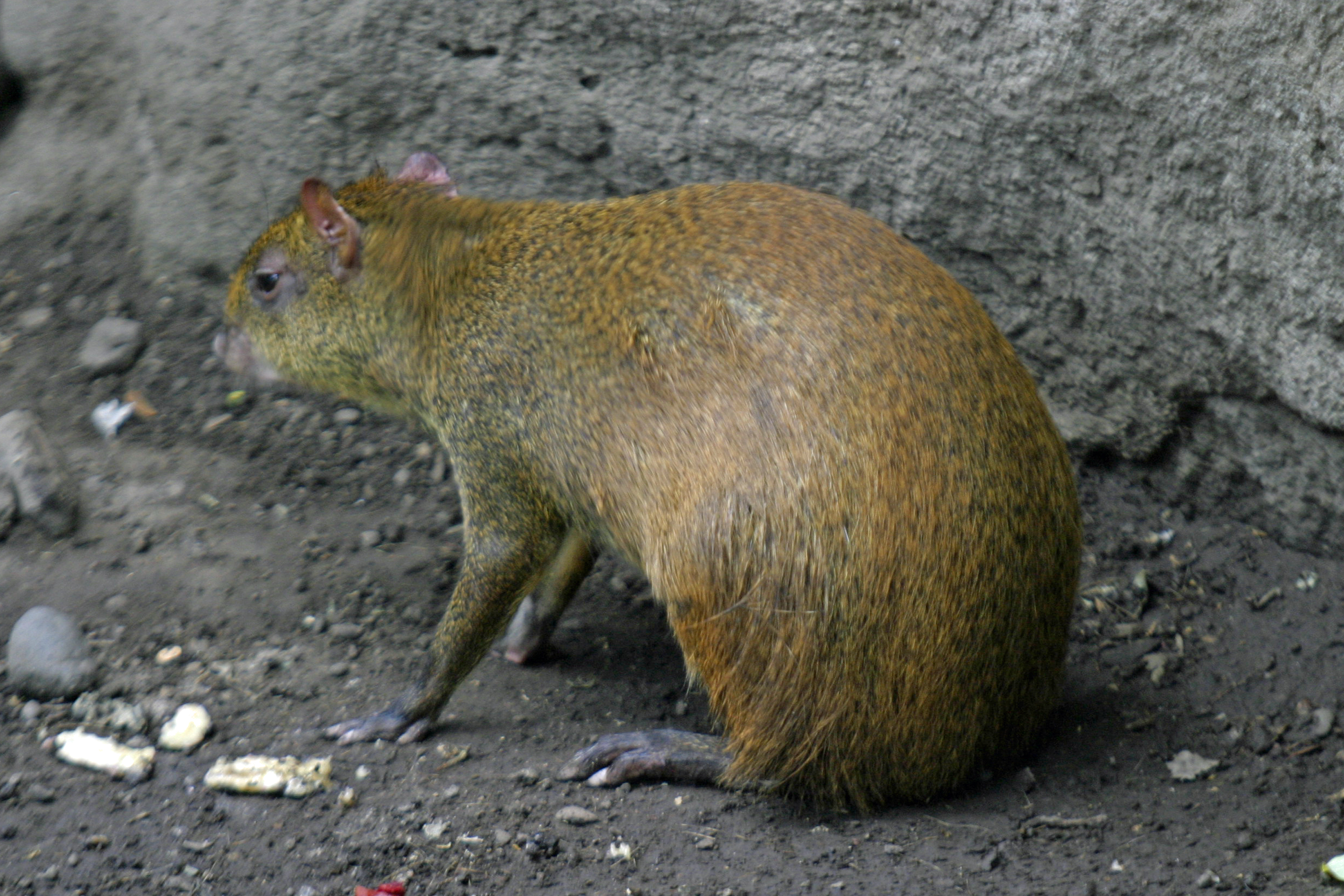
An agouti (Dasyprocta punctata) which feed on immature fruit of P. elegans

The embryos of immature fruit are eaten by agoutis (Dasyprocta punctata) once they have fallen to the forest floor. Mature seeds can be infected by fungi and are also eaten by bruchid beetle larvae. The squirrel, Sciurus ingrami eats the leaves of P. elegans on BCI, but not in Southeastern Brazil. Woolly spider monkeys in Brazil feed extensively on the leaves in October, prior to the beginning of their mating season. The leaves are thought to be low in tannins and other secondary metabolites which hinder protein digestion, making them an ideal food before the mating season. They also contain phytoestrogens which can change the monkey's estrogen levels, possibly affecting their fertility. Both young and mature leaves of P. elegans are eaten by howler monkeys, as the leaves mature, the protein content decreases, the cell wall content increases, but the proportion of non-structural carbohydrates remains equal. When fresh, the leaves contain between 100 and 200 mg of ascorbic acid (Vitamin C) per 100 g, like humans some primates on BCI require in their diet, since they do not possess the gene for L-gulonolactone oxidase, the enzyme required to convert glucose to ascorbic acid.

== Uses ==
Platypodium elegans is not known to have any uses in traditional medicine. The Smithsonian Tropical Research Institute herbarium report its wood is used for timber, being described as "white, knotty, light and fragile". Pittier remarked in 1931 that the wood is little used in Panama however since the mature trunks are normally hollow and filled with an oily liquid.
