= Amendoim bravo =

Amendoim bravo is a common name for several plants and may refer to:

- Euphorbia heterophylla, a weedy herb native to Central America and widely introduced in tropical regions
- Platypodium elegans, a large leguminous tree found in the Neotropics
- Pterogyne nitens, a South American tree
