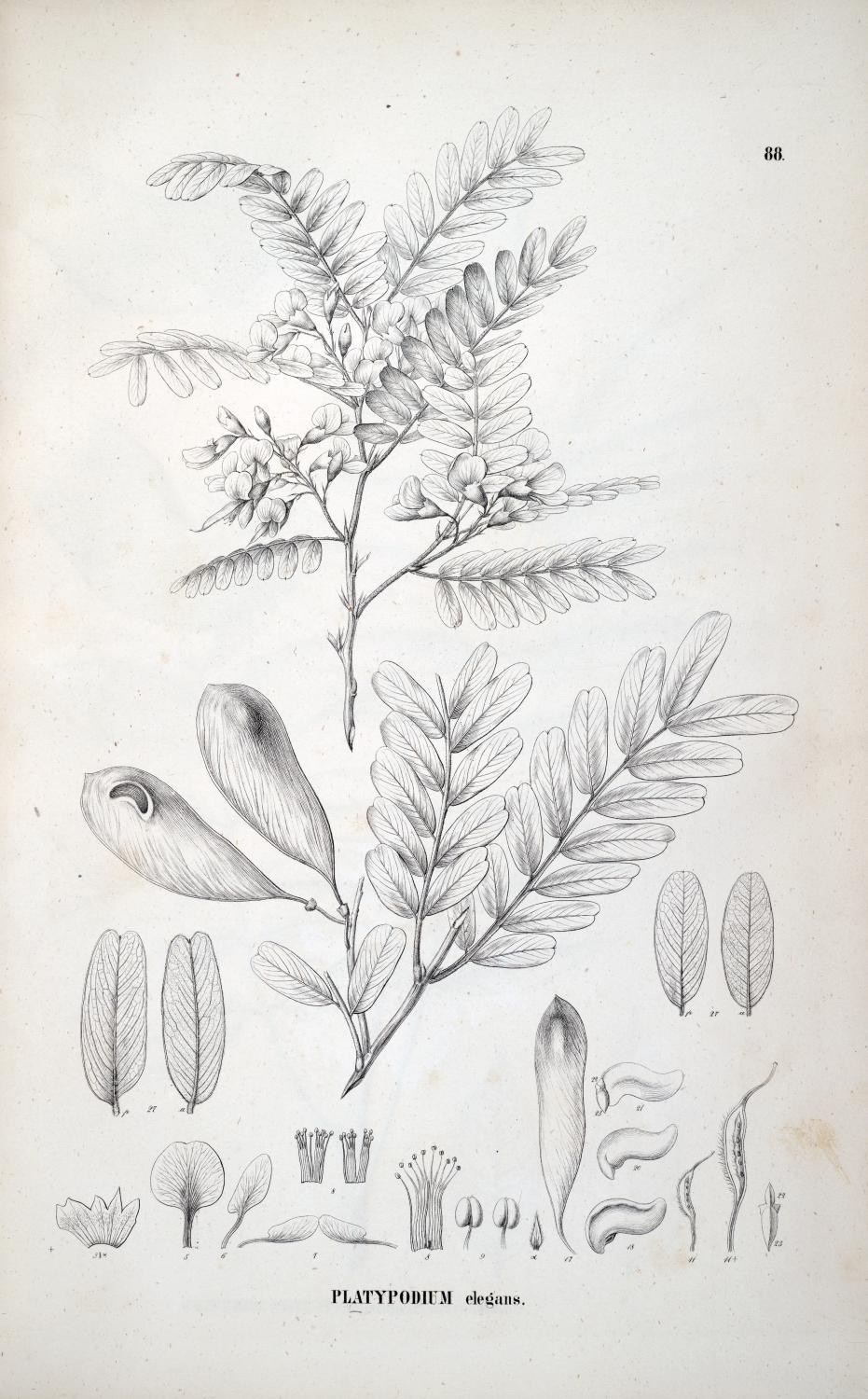
- An illustration of Platypodium elegans from the Flora Brasiliensis

Scientific classification
- Kingdom: Plantae
- Clade: Tracheophytes
- Clade: Angiosperms
- Clade: Eudicots
- Clade: Rosids
- Order: Fabales
- Family: Fabaceae
- Subfamily: Faboideae
- Tribe: Dalbergieae
- Genus: Platypodium; Vogel (1837)

Species
- Platypodium elegans Vogel; Platypodium viride Vogel

Synonyms
- Callisemaea Benth. (1837)

= Platypodium =

Genus of legumes

Platypodium is a genus of flowering plants in the family Fabaceae. It includes two species of trees native to the tropical Americas, from Panama through Colombia, Venezuela, and Brazil to Bolivia and Paraguay. Typical habitats are seasonally-dry tropical forest, humid gallery or riverine forest, thicket, and woodland. It belongs to the subfamily Faboideae, and has been assigned to the informal monophyletic Pterocarpus clade within the Dalbergieae.
