= Platypodium viride =

Scientific classification
- Kingdom: Plantae
- Clade: Tracheophytes
- Clade: Angiosperms
- Clade: Eudicots
- Clade: Rosids
- Order: Fabales
- Family: Fabaceae
- Subfamily: Faboideae
- Genus: Platypodium
- Species: P. viride

Binomial name
- Platypodium viride Vogel

Species of plant

Platypodium viride is a species of tree in the family Fabaceae found in Peru. It is one of two accepted species of Platypodium, the other being P. elegans. It was first described by Julius Rudolph Theodor Vogel in 1837.
