= Microvelia karunaratnei =

Scientific classification
- Domain: Eukaryota
- Kingdom: Animalia
- Phylum: Arthropoda
- Class: Insecta
- Order: Hemiptera
- Suborder: Heteroptera
- Family: Veliidae
- Genus: Microvelia
- Species: M. karunaratnei

Binomial name
- Microvelia karunaratnei J. Polhemus, 1999

Species of true bug

Microvelia karunaratnei is a species of smaller water strider in the family Veliidae. It has only been recorded in Sri Lanka and is one of the few veliid species known to inhabit tree holes.
