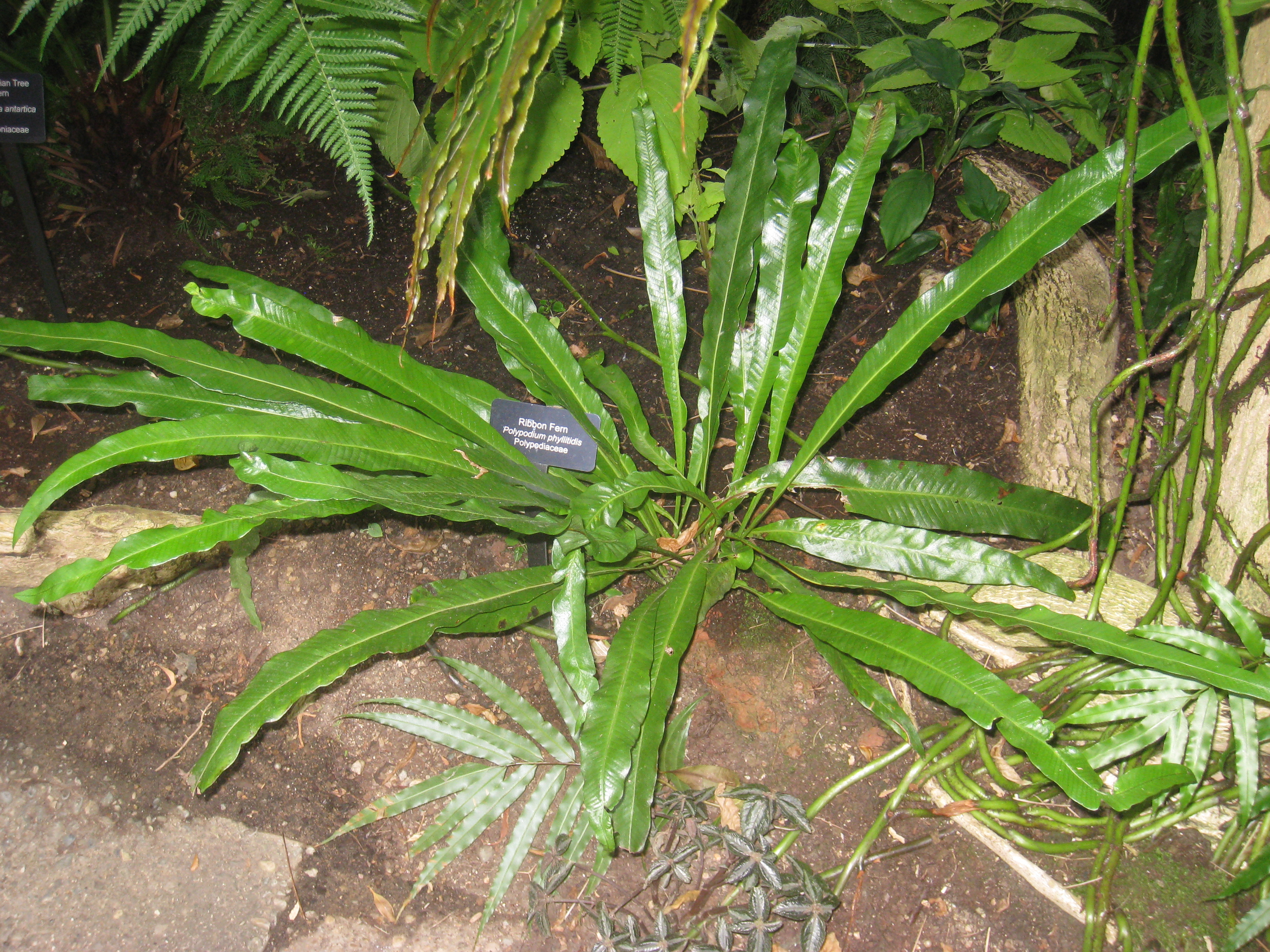
- Clump of Campyloneurum phyllitidis growing at the Matthei Botanical Gardens

Conservation status
- Secure (NatureServe)

Scientific classification
- Kingdom: Plantae
- Clade: Tracheophytes
- Division: Polypodiophyta
- Class: Polypodiopsida
- Order: Polypodiales
- Suborder: Polypodiineae
- Family: Polypodiaceae
- Genus: Campyloneurum
- Species: C. phyllitidis

Binomial name
- Campyloneurum phyllitidis (L.) C.Presl.

Synonyms
- Cyrtophlebium phyllitidis (L.) J. Sm. Polypodium comosum L. Polypodium conjugatum Poir; Polypodium gladiatum Vell. Polypodium levigatum var. rigidum Harr. Polypodium parallelinerve Desv. Polypodium phyllitidis L. Polypodium phyllitidis var. elongatum Hieron. Polypodium phyllitidis var. linneanum Hook. Polypodium phyllitidis var. swartzianum Griseb. Polypodium simplicifolium Salisb.

= Campyloneurum phyllitidis =

Species of fern

Campyloneurum phyllitidis, commonly known as the long strap fern, is a species of fern in the family Polypodiaceae.

== Distribution ==
Campyloneurum phyllitidis is found in North, Central, and South America: from Florida, the Caribbean, and southeastern Mexico in the north; to tropical Peru and Brazil, and Paraguay in the south.

Other countries it is native to include the Southeastern United States, Cuba, Costa Rica, Bolivia, and Venezuela. It is also present in Florida, Puerto Rico, Hawaii and the Virgin Islands. The fern is common on Barro Colorado Island of Panama.

== Description ==
Campyloneurum phyllitidis is an epiphyte, growing on other plants; generally the fern is found growing in the canopies of trees.

It has a relatively large rhizome from which many fine rootlets covered in dark reddish-brown scales grow. Its leaves are simple in shape, hairless, 45–100 centimetres (18–39 in) long and 8–12 centimetres (3.1–4.7 in) wide.

The sori are round and small, occurring in on both sides of lateral veins of the leaves.

It is known to grow as an epiphyte on Platypodium elegans, Ceiba pentandra, Tabebuia guayacan, Anacardium excelsum, Socratea exorrhiza, Marila laxiflora and Perebea xanthochyma.

== Uses ==
Campyloneurum phyllitidis is cultivated as an ornamental plant, and is the most common species of Campyloneurum found in cultivation. The fern grows well in well-drained soil under medium levels of light. It needs to be protected from slugs and snails.

Campyloneurum phyllitidis was grown in England during the Victorian era, when ferns were particularly popular (the phenomenon known as pteridomania). The fern was described by an author of the time, Shirley Hibberd, as being "very distinct" and that it formed a "striking object when grown well".

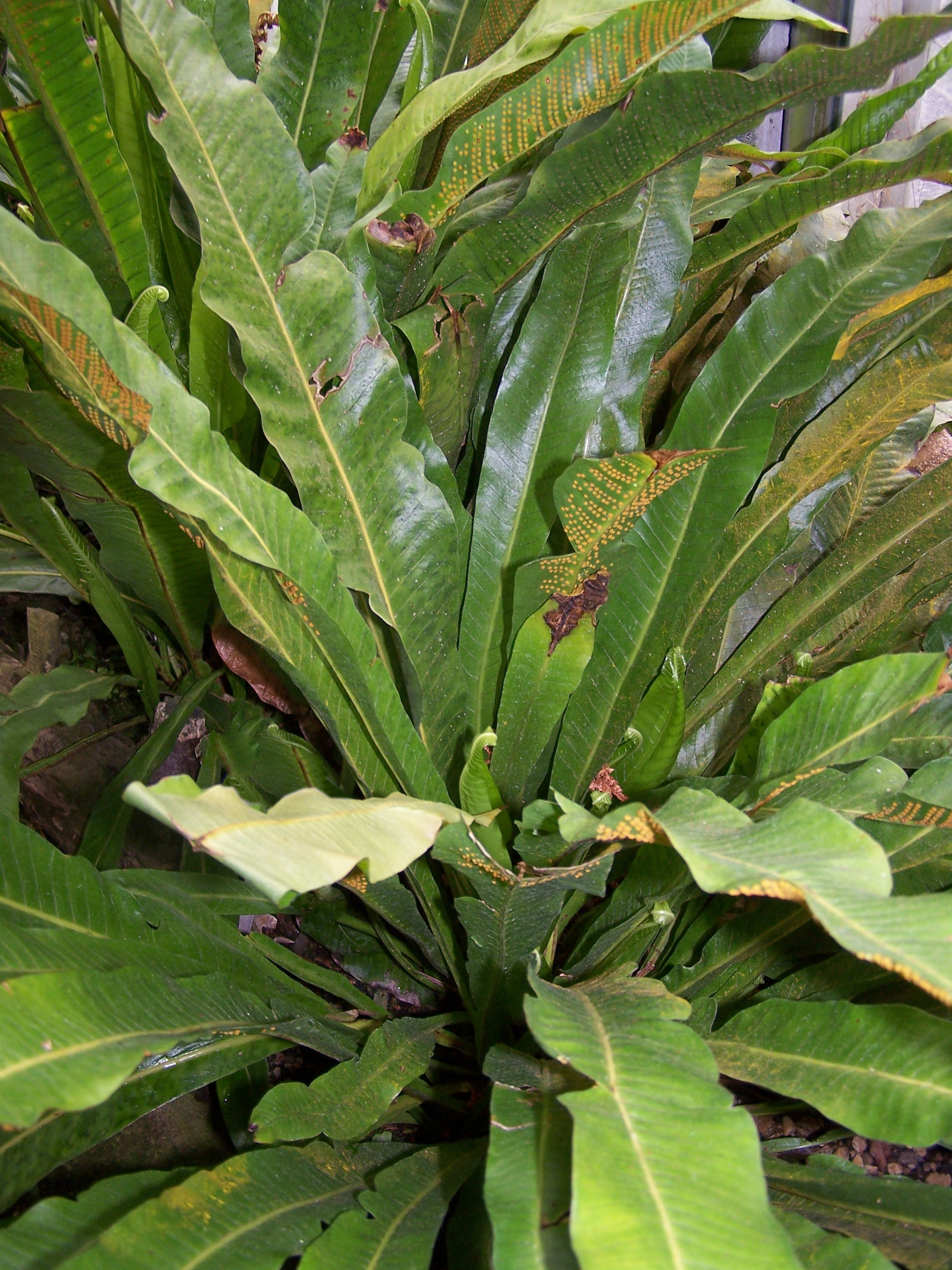
Close up of Campyloneurum phyllitidis leaves, with sori on their underside.

== See also ==
- Pteridophyta (ferns) of the Americas
