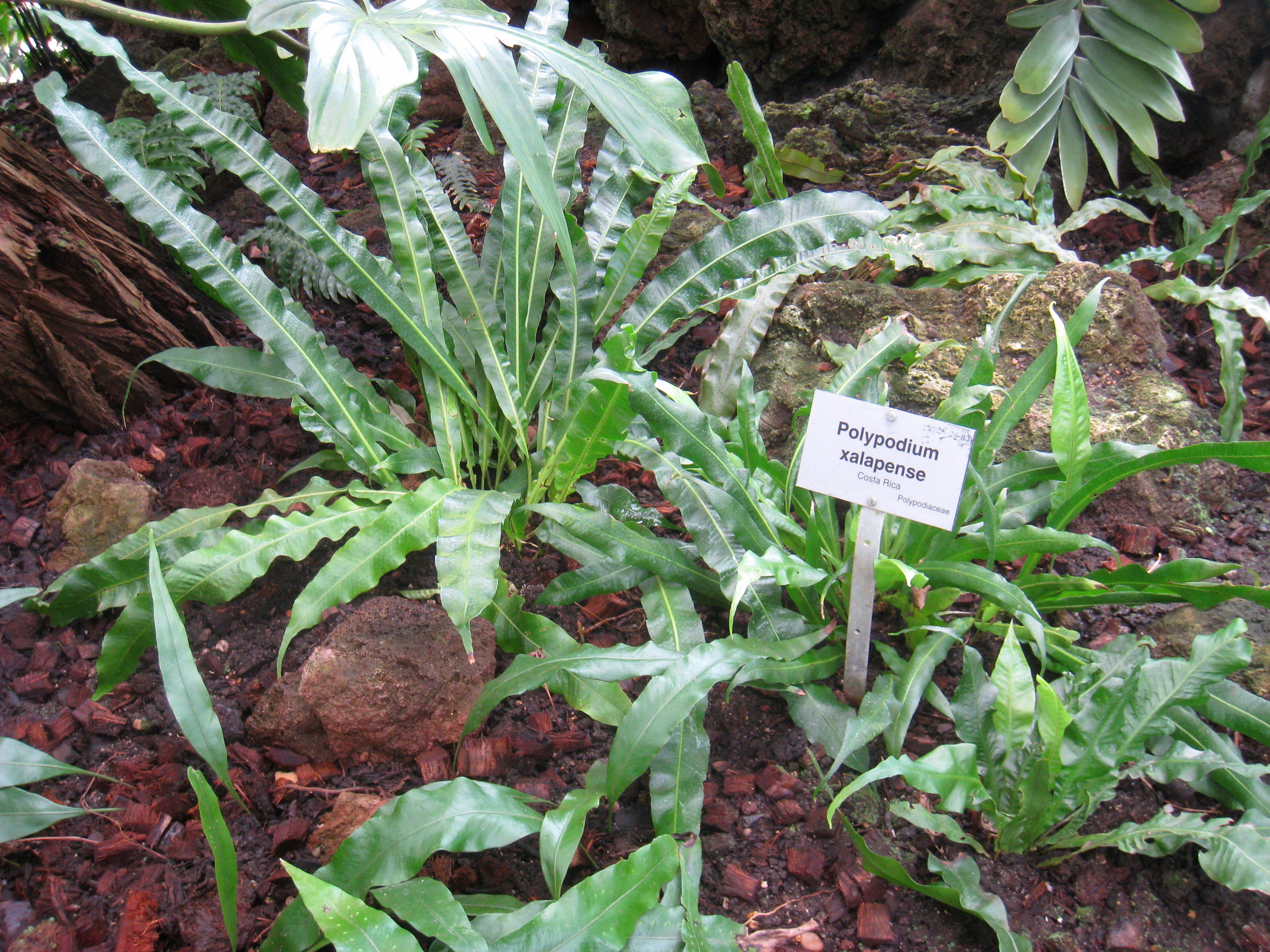

Scientific classification
- Kingdom: Plantae
- Clade: Tracheophytes
- Division: Polypodiophyta
- Class: Polypodiopsida
- Order: Polypodiales
- Suborder: Polypodiineae
- Family: Polypodiaceae
- Genus: Campyloneurum
- Species: C. xalapense

Binomial name
- Campyloneurum xalapense Fée

Synonyms
- Polypodium xalapense (Fée) Christ

= Campyloneurum xalapense =

Species of fern

Camplyoneurum xalapense is a species of fern in the family Polypodiaceae. It is apparently found only within Central America, especially in southern Mexico and Guatemala.
