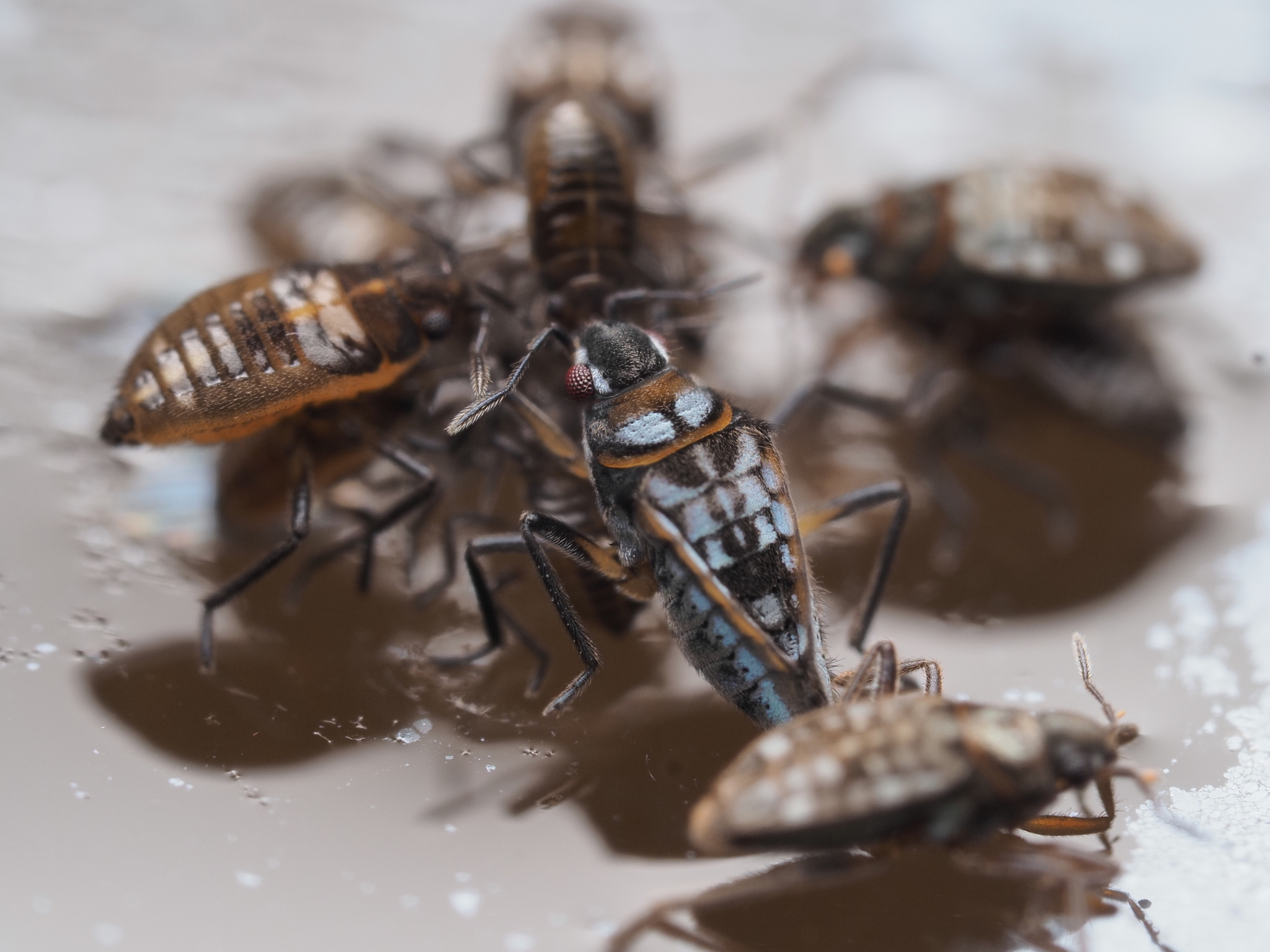

Scientific classification
- Kingdom: Animalia
- Phylum: Arthropoda
- Clade: Pancrustacea
- Class: Insecta
- Order: Hemiptera
- Suborder: Heteroptera
- Family: Veliidae
- Genus: Microvelia
- Species: M. macgregori

Binomial name
- Microvelia macgregori (Kirkaldy, 1899)

= Microvelia macgregori =

Species of insect

Microvelia macgregori is a species of true bug in the family Veliidae. It is semi-aquatic, living on the surface of water in freshwater habitats in New Zealand.

== Description ==
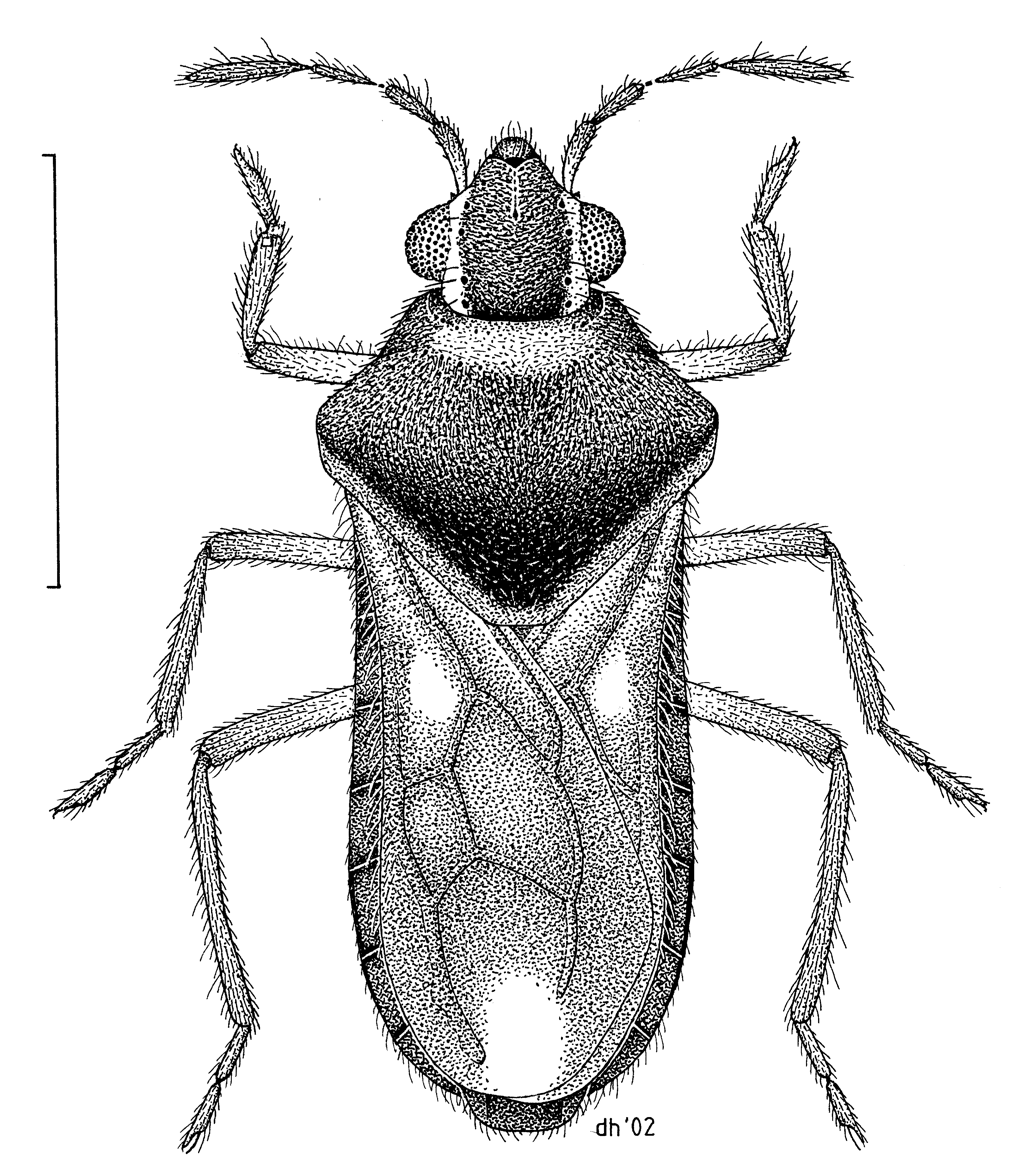
Illustration by Des Helmore

Microvelia macgregori is a very small bug with a length of about 2 mm (0.08 in).

== Distribution and habitat ==
Microvelia macgregori is endemic to New Zealand where it lives on the surface of water in various aquatic habitats including lakes and ponds, and the slow-moving backwaters of rivers and streams. It is the only member of the Veliidae found in New Zealand; on upland tarns, winged forms are common while in lowland areas, wingless individuals predominate.

== Behaviour ==
Members of the family Veliidae are commonly known as "water striders", and move across the surface of quiet backwaters by walking or rowing; they can also clamber onto wet rocks or mudbanks. They lay their small eggs on floating or emergent plants, gluing them to the surface of the vegetation. Microvelia macgregori spends much of its time on the surface of water, making seemingly random movements, moving jerkily in one direction, pivoting and moving off again in another. The speed of the movements varies and the motion may be interrupted by pauses of varying duration. When a number of bugs are present on a water surface, their movements are not coordinated. M. macgregori is a predator and scavenger; when a larger living insect inadvertently lands on the water surface and struggles to get free, this makes vibrations which attract M. macgregori to feed. The first bug to arrive extends its rostrum slowly and tries to insert its stylet into the prey. If the prey struggles further, the bug backs off, but tries again to feed when the struggling dies down. Other bugs may arrive, each trying to insert its stylus into the prey. When the feeding bugs are few in number, they periodically remove the stylus and reinsert it in a different position. Late arrivals may find little room to get close, and try to push their way in between other feeding bugs, which resist by kicking at the intruder with their hind legs. Dead insects drifting on the surface of the water do not make vibrations. In the daytime, the first bug may find large dead prey items visually, but smaller prey is found by accident, with later arriving bugs being attracted by vibrations created by the early arrivals. At night, dead prey of any size is found by accident.
