= Campyloneurum oellgaardii =

Conservation status
- Vulnerable (IUCN 3.1)

Scientific classification
- Kingdom: Plantae
- Clade: Tracheophytes
- Division: Polypodiophyta
- Class: Polypodiopsida
- Order: Polypodiales
- Suborder: Polypodiineae
- Family: Polypodiaceae
- Genus: Campyloneurum
- Species: C. oellgaardii

Binomial name
- Campyloneurum oellgaardii B.León

Species of plant

Campyloneurum oellgaardii is a species of fern in the family Polypodiaceae. It is endemic to Ecuador. Its natural habitat is subtropical or tropical moist lowland forests. It is threatened by habitat loss.
