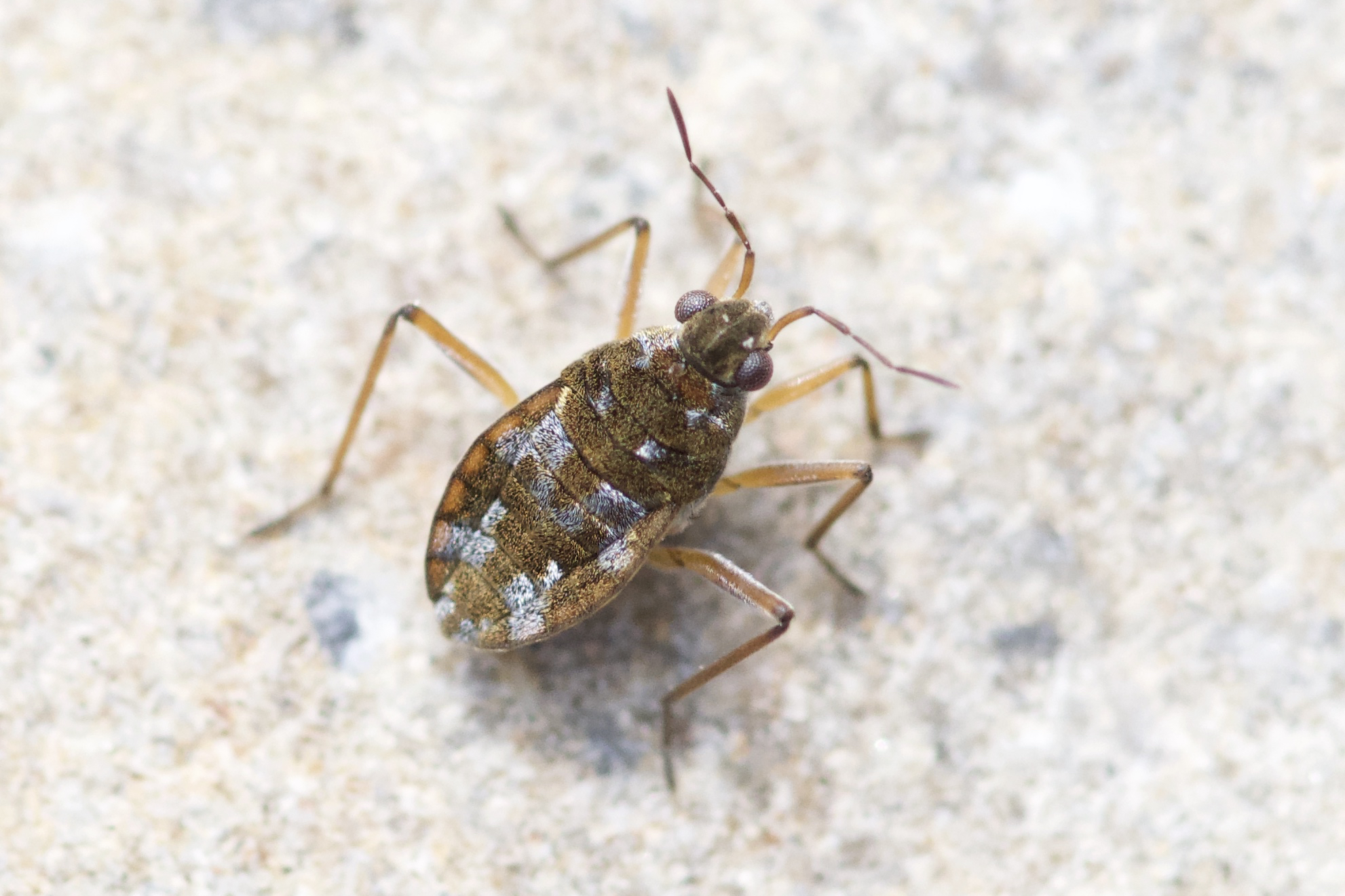

Scientific classification
- Kingdom: Animalia
- Phylum: Arthropoda
- Clade: Pancrustacea
- Class: Insecta
- Order: Hemiptera
- Suborder: Heteroptera
- Family: Veliidae
- Genus: Microvelia
- Species: M. americana

Binomial name
- Microvelia americana (Uhler, 1884)

= Microvelia americana =

Species of true bug

Microvelia americana, also known as the broad-shouldered water strider, is a species of smaller water strider in the family Veliidae. It is found in North America.
