= Marila saramaccana =

Conservation status
- Vulnerable (IUCN 2.3)

Scientific classification
- Kingdom: Plantae
- Clade: Tracheophytes
- Clade: Angiosperms
- Clade: Eudicots
- Clade: Rosids
- Order: Malpighiales
- Family: Calophyllaceae
- Genus: Marila
- Species: M. saramaccana

Binomial name
- Marila saramaccana Pulle

Species of flowering plant

Marila saramaccana is a species of flowering plant in the Calophyllaceae family. It is found only in Suriname.
