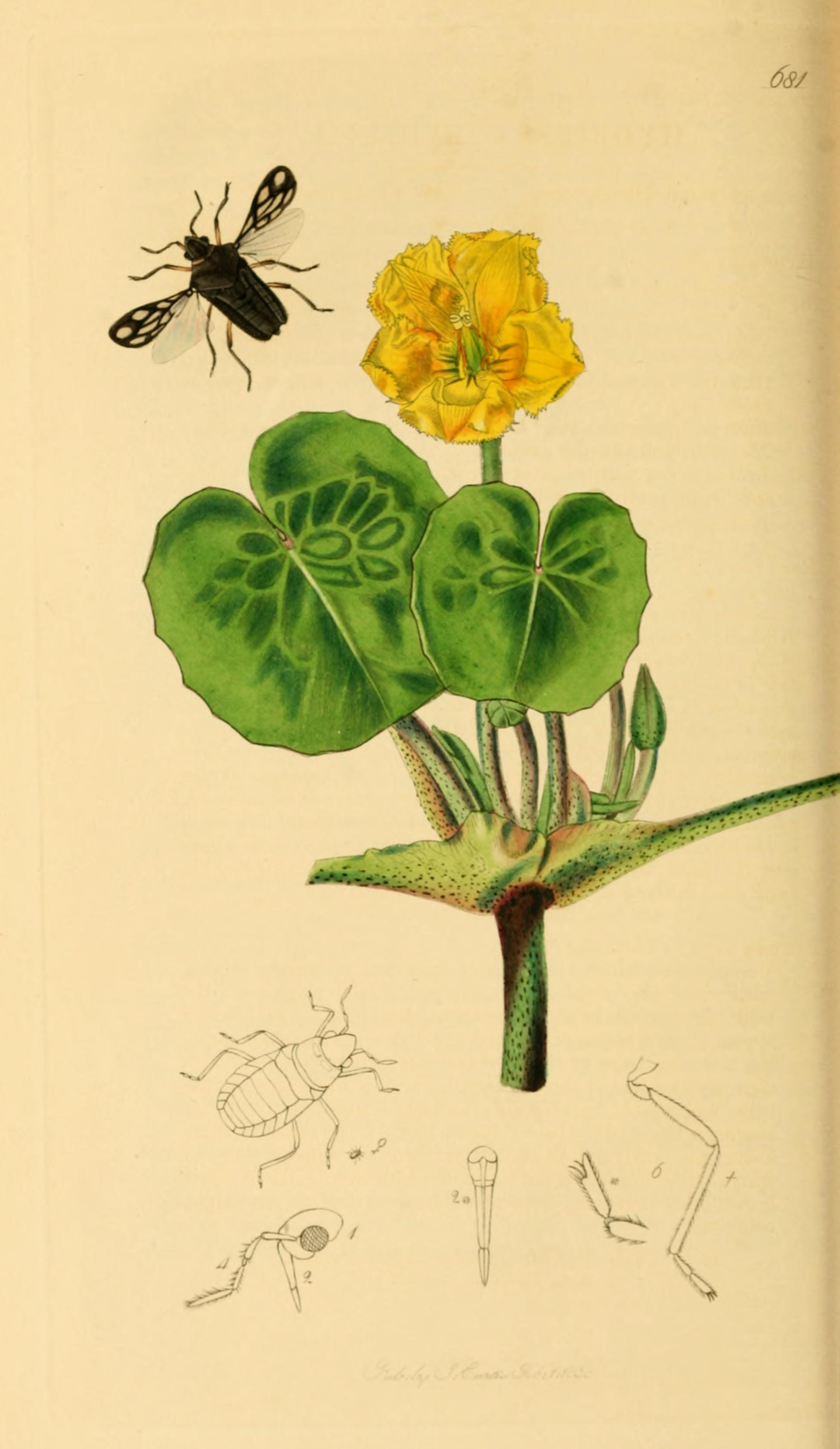
- Microvelia pygmaea depicted in British Entomology

Scientific classification
- Kingdom: Animalia
- Phylum: Arthropoda
- Clade: Pancrustacea
- Class: Insecta
- Order: Hemiptera
- Suborder: Heteroptera
- Family: Veliidae
- Genus: Microvelia
- Species: M. pygmaea

Binomial name
- Microvelia pygmaea (Dufour, 1833)

= Microvelia pygmaea =

Species of true bug

Microvelia pygmaea is a Palearctic species of true bug. It is aquatic.
