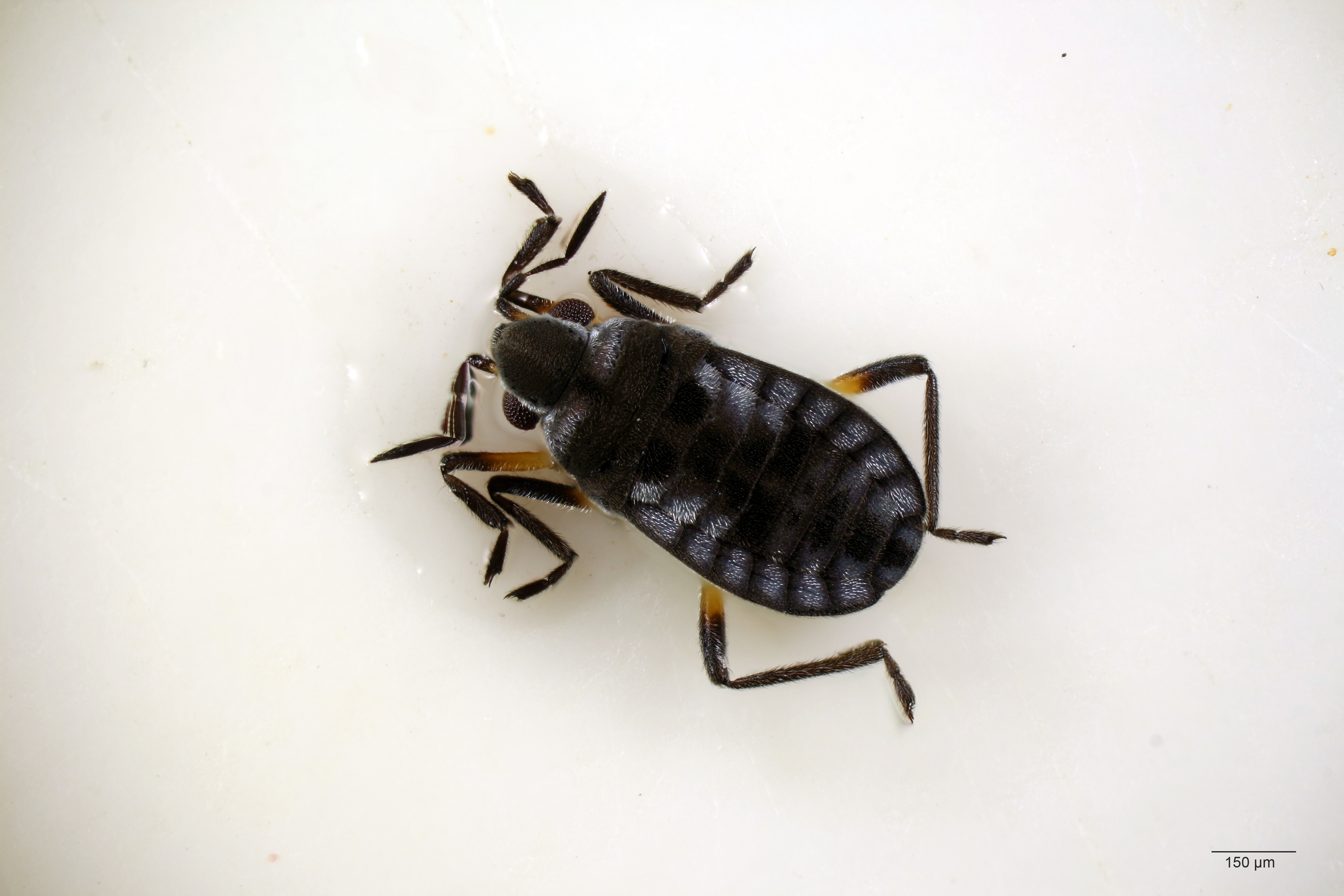

Scientific classification
- Kingdom: Animalia
- Phylum: Arthropoda
- Clade: Pancrustacea
- Class: Insecta
- Order: Hemiptera
- Suborder: Heteroptera
- Family: Veliidae
- Genus: Microvelia
- Species: M. reticulata

Binomial name
- Microvelia reticulata (Burmeister 1835)

= Microvelia reticulata =

Species of true bug

Microvelia reticulata is a Palearctic species of true bug. It is aquatic.
