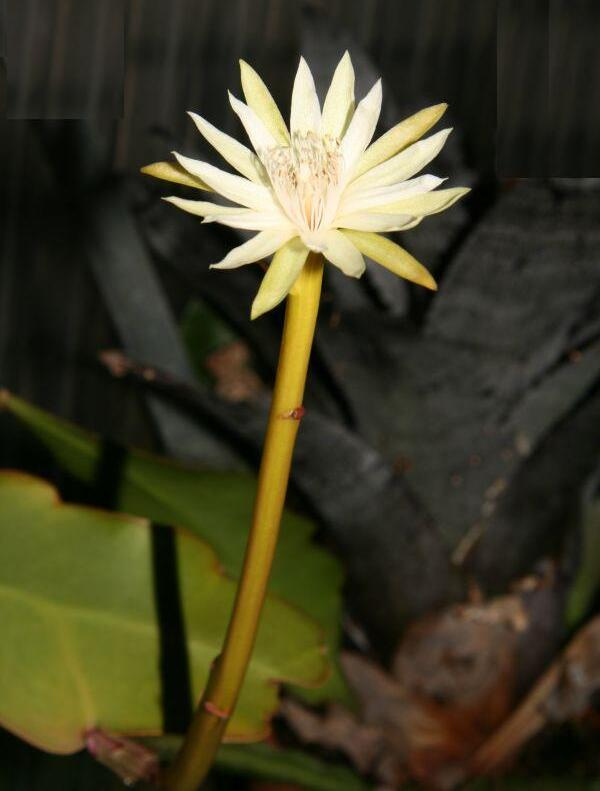

Scientific classification
- Kingdom: Plantae
- Clade: Tracheophytes
- Clade: Angiosperms
- Clade: Eudicots
- Order: Caryophyllales
- Family: Cactaceae
- Subfamily: Cactoideae
- Genus: Epiphyllum
- Species: E. phyllanthus

Binomial name
- Epiphyllum phyllanthus Haworth

Varieties
- Epiphyllum phyllanthus var. columbiense Epiphyllum phyllanthus ssp. rubrocoronatum

Synonyms
- Cactus phyllanthus Phyllocactus phyllanthus Epiphyllum hookeri Epiphyllum phyllanthus var. hookeri Epiphyllum pittieri

= Epiphyllum phyllanthus =

Species of cactus

Epiphyllum phyllanthus, commonly known as the climbing cactus, is a species of epiphytic cacti. It has no leaves, instead having stems that photosynthesise. It is thought to be pollinated by hawkmoths, as the flowers only open at night and produce a strong fragrance.

It is the most common epiphyte on the tree, Platypodium elegans, particularly growing in cavities in the trunk.
