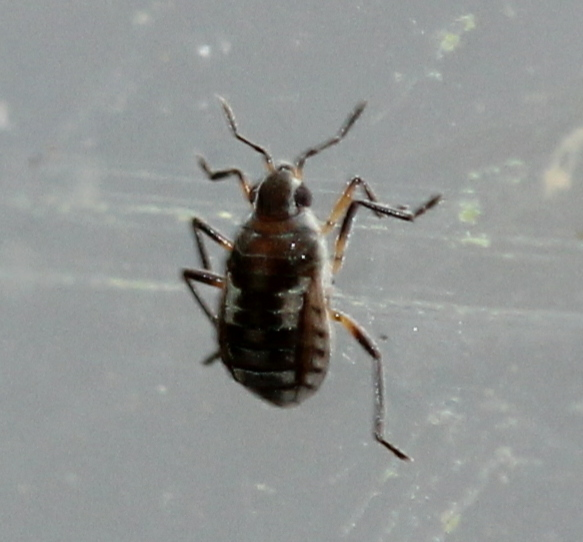

Scientific classification
- Kingdom: Animalia
- Phylum: Arthropoda
- Class: Insecta
- Order: Hemiptera
- Suborder: Heteroptera
- Family: Veliidae
- Genus: Microvelia
- Species: M. pulchella

Binomial name
- Microvelia pulchella Westwood, 1834

Synonyms
- Microvelia borealis Torre-Bueno, 1916; Microvelia incerta Kirby, 1890; Ragovelia incerta (Kirby, 1890)

= Microvelia pulchella =

Species of true bug

Microvelia pulchella is a species of smaller water strider in the family Veliidae. It is found in the New World.
