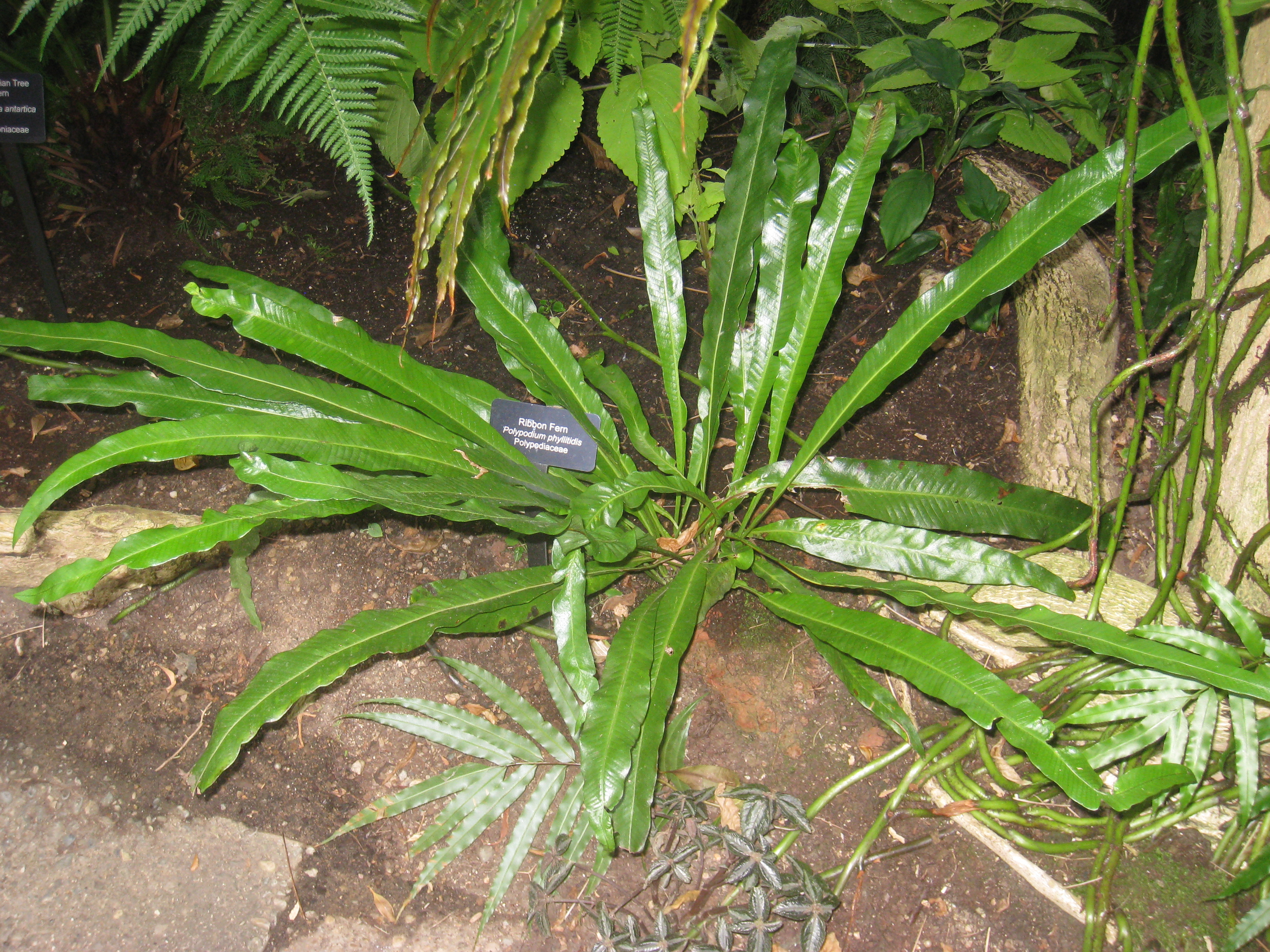
- Campyloneurum phyllitidis

Scientific classification
- Kingdom: Plantae
- Clade: Tracheophytes
- Division: Polypodiophyta
- Class: Polypodiopsida
- Order: Polypodiales
- Suborder: Polypodiineae
- Family: Polypodiaceae
- Subfamily: Polypodioideae
- Genus: Campyloneurum; C.Presl

Species
- See text.

Synonyms
- Cyrtophlebium (R.Br.) J.Sm.; Hyalotrichia Copel.; Hyalotrichopteris L.D.Gómez; Hyalotrichopteris W.H.Wagner

= Campyloneurum =

Genus of ferns

Campyloneurum is a genus of ferns in the family Polypodiaceae, subfamily Polypodioideae, according to the Pteridophyte Phylogeny Group classification of 2016 (PPG I). They are commonly known as strap ferns.

== Species ==
As of July 2025, Checklist of Ferns and Lycophytes of the World accepted the following sixty-four species:

- Campyloneurum abruptum (Lindm.) B.León
- Campyloneurum acrocarpon Fée
- Campyloneurum acutum A.Rojas
- Campyloneurum aglaolepis (Alston) de la Sota
- Campyloneurum amazonense B.León
- Campyloneurum amphostenon (Kunze ex Klotzsch) Fée
- Campyloneurum anetioides (Christ) R.M.Tryon & A.F.Tryon
- Campyloneurum angustifolium (Sw.) Fée
- Campyloneurum angustipaleatum (Alston) M.Mey. ex Lellinger
- Campyloneurum aphanophlebium (Kunze) T.Moore
- Campyloneurum asplundii (C.Chr.) Ching
- Campyloneurum atlanticum R.C.Moran & Labiak
- Campyloneurum atrosquamatum Labiak, B.León & R.C.Moran
- Campyloneurum austrobrasilianum (Alston) de la Sota
- Campyloneurum brevifolium (Lodd. ex Link) Link
- Campyloneurum castaneum Labiak & R.C.Moran
- Campyloneurum centrobrasilianum Lellinger
- Campyloneurum chlorolepis Alston
- Campyloneurum chrysopodum (Klotzsch) Fée
- Campyloneurum coarctatum (Kunze) Fée
- Campyloneurum cochense (Hieron.) Ching
- Campyloneurum concavum R.C.Moran & Labiak
- Campyloneurum costatum (Kunze) C.Presl
- Campyloneurum crispum Fée
- Campyloneurum cubense Fée
- Campyloneurum decurrens (Raddi) C.Presl
- Campyloneurum densifolium (Hieron.) Lellinger
- Campyloneurum ensifolium (Willd.) J.Sm.
- Campyloneurum falcoideum (Kuhn ex Hieron.) M.Mey. ex Lellinger
- Campyloneurum fallax Fée
- Campyloneurum filiforme Labiak & R.C.Moran
- Campyloneurum fuscosquamatum Lellinger
- Campyloneurum gracile A.Rojas
- Campyloneurum herbaceum (Christ) Ching
- Campyloneurum inflatum M.Mey. ex Lellinger
- Campyloneurum jamaicense Labiak & R.C.Moran
- Campyloneurum leoniae A.Rojas
- Campyloneurum lorentzii (Hieron.) Ching
- Campyloneurum macrosorum Fée
- Campyloneurum madrense A.Rojas
- Campyloneurum magnificum T.Moore
- Campyloneurum majus (Hieron. ex Hicken) Lellinger
- Campyloneurum nitidissimum (Mett.) Ching
- Campyloneurum nitidum (Kaulf.) C.Presl
- Campyloneurum oellgaardii B.León
- Campyloneurum ophiocaulon (Klotzsch) Fée
- Campyloneurum oxypholis (Maxon) Ching
- Campyloneurum parvisquama Labiak & R.C.Moran
- Campyloneurum pascoense R.M.Tryon & A.F.Tryon
- Campyloneurum pentaphyllum (Willd.) Pic. Serm.
- Campyloneurum phyllitidis (L.) C.Presl
- Campyloneurum pichinchae Labiak & R.C.Moran
- Campyloneurum poloense (Rosenst.) B.León
- Campyloneurum repens (Aubl.) C.Presl
- Campyloneurum rigidum J.Sm.
- Campyloneurum serpentinum (Christ) Ching
- Campyloneurum solutum (Klotzsch) Fée
- Campyloneurum sphenodes (Kunze ex Klotzsch) Fée
- Campyloneurum sublucidum (Christ) Ching
- Campyloneurum tayronae (D.Sanín) comb.ined., currently Serpocaulon tayronae
- Campyloneurum tenuipes Maxon
- Campyloneurum tucumanense (Hieron.) Ching
- Campyloneurum vulpinum (Lindm.) Ching
- Campyloneurum wacketii Lellinger
- Campyloneurum wurdackii B.León
- Campyloneurum xalapense Fée
