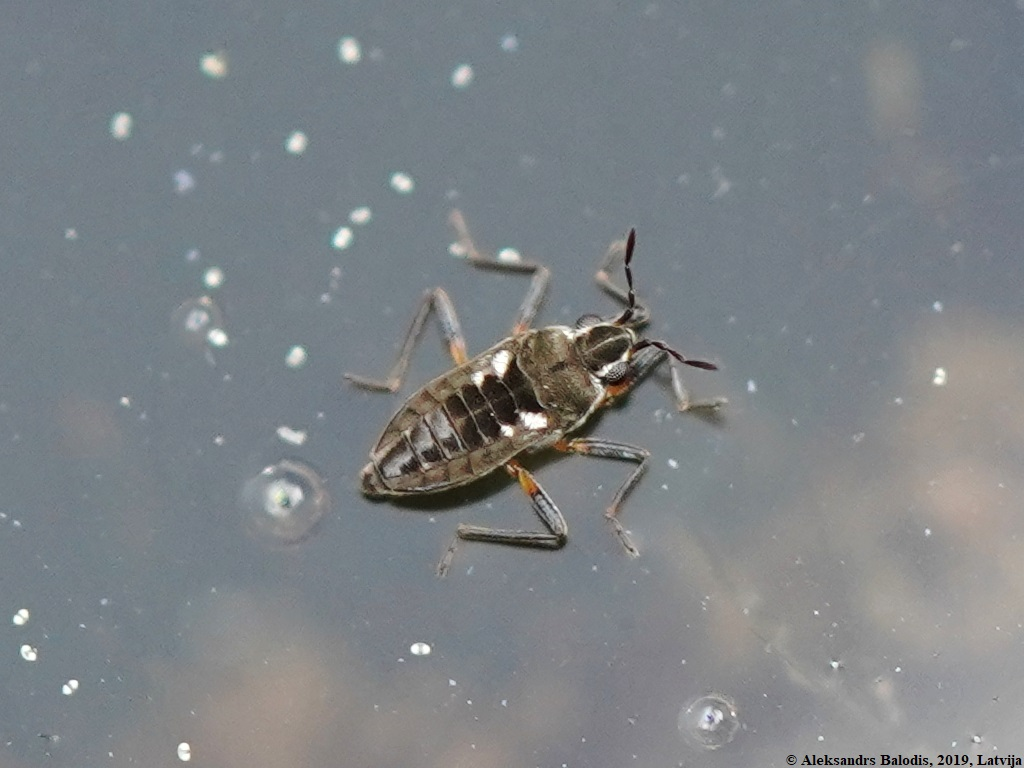

Scientific classification
- Kingdom: Animalia
- Phylum: Arthropoda
- Clade: Pancrustacea
- Class: Insecta
- Order: Hemiptera
- Suborder: Heteroptera
- Family: Veliidae
- Genus: Microvelia
- Species: M. buenoi

Binomial name
- Microvelia buenoi Drake, 1920

Synonyms
- Microvelia umbricola Wroblewsky, 1938

= Microvelia buenoi =

Species of true bug

Microvelia buenoi is a species of smaller water strider in the family Veliidae. It is found in Europe and Northern Asia (excluding China) and North America.
