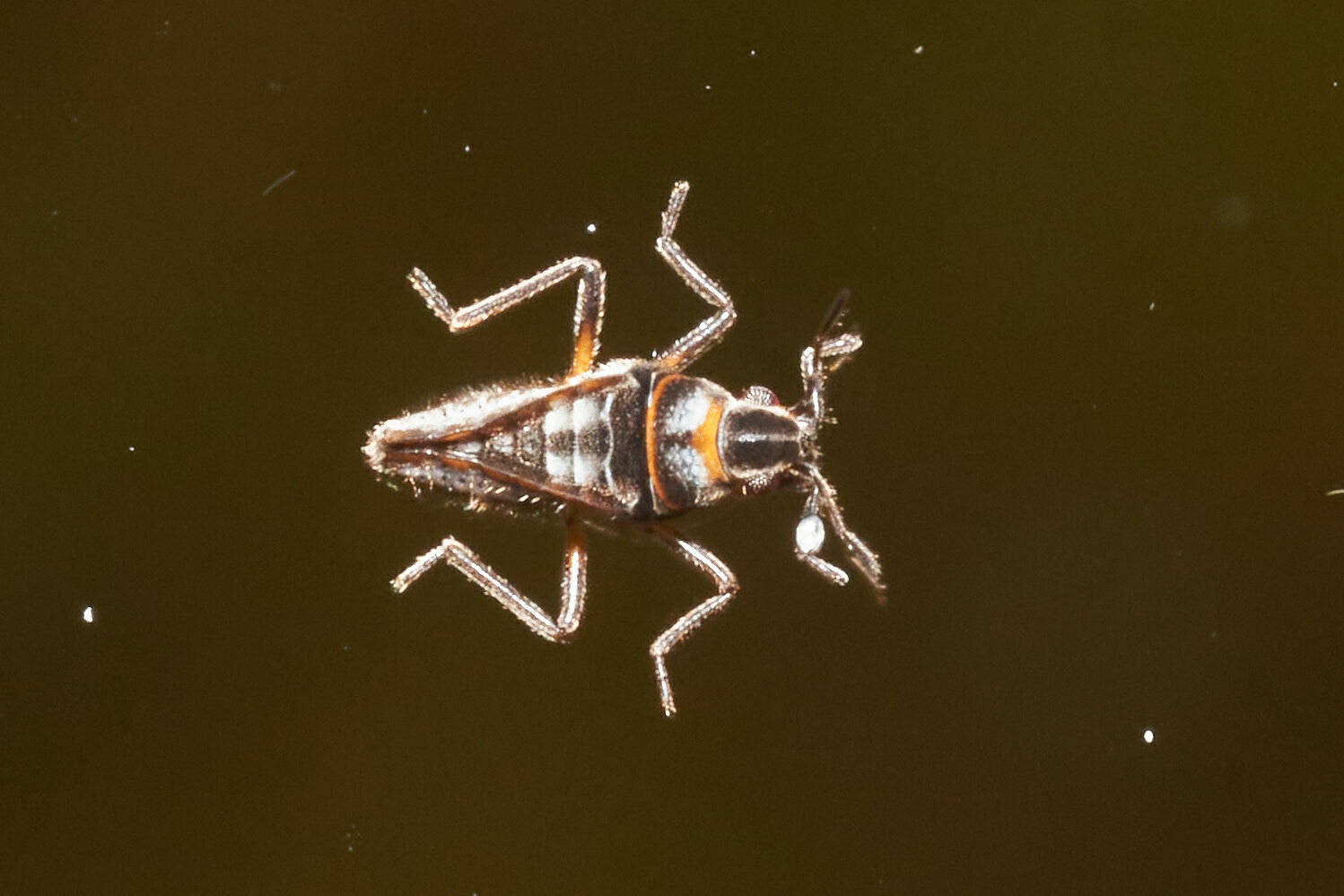
- Adult from the saddle region of Hawaiʻi island

Scientific classification
- Domain: Eukaryota
- Kingdom: Animalia
- Phylum: Arthropoda
- Class: Insecta
- Order: Hemiptera
- Suborder: Heteroptera
- Family: Veliidae
- Genus: Microvelia
- Species: M. vagans

Binomial name
- Microvelia vagans (White, 1878)

= Microvelia vagans =

Species of insect

Microvelia vagans, the Hawaiʻi pond bug, is a small species of water treader endemic to the Hawaiian islands.

== Distribution ==
M. vagans is endemic to Hawaiʻi, where it is found on all of the main Hawaiian islands. It occupies areas of still water (including small puddles) at a variety of elevations, although it is more common in the less developed higher elevations of the islands.
