= Marila spiciformis =

Conservation status
- Critically Endangered (IUCN 3.1)

Scientific classification
- Kingdom: Plantae
- Clade: Tracheophytes
- Clade: Angiosperms
- Clade: Eudicots
- Clade: Rosids
- Order: Malpighiales
- Family: Calophyllaceae
- Genus: Marila
- Species: M. spiciformis

Binomial name
- Marila spiciformis McDearman & S.McDaniel

Species of plant

Marila spiciformis is a species of flowering plant in the Calophyllaceae family. It is a tree native to Ecuador and northern Peru. It grows in foothill rain forests from 500 to 800 meters elevation.
