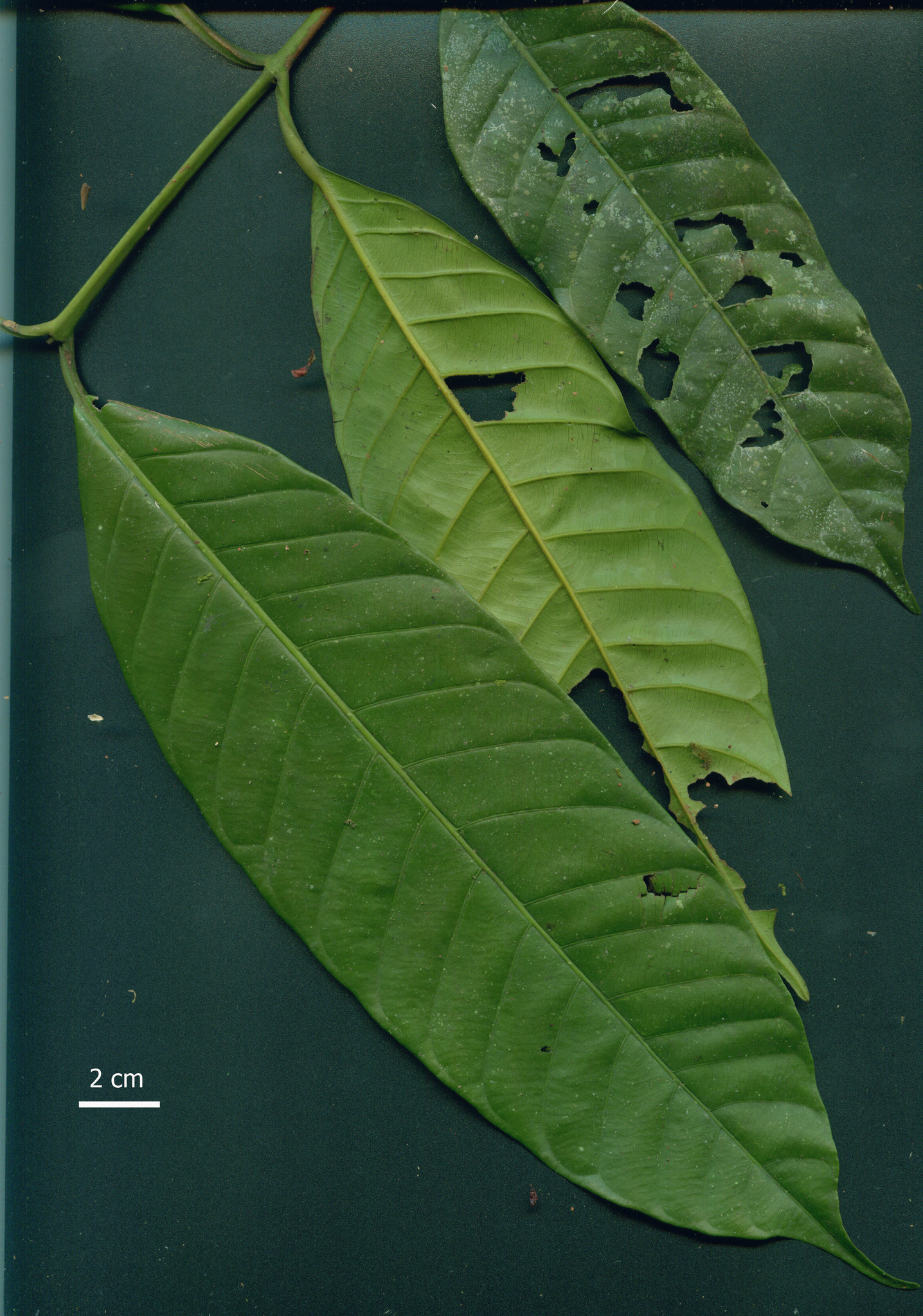
- Marila laxiflora

Scientific classification
- Kingdom: Plantae
- Clade: Tracheophytes
- Clade: Angiosperms
- Clade: Eudicots
- Clade: Rosids
- Order: Malpighiales
- Family: Calophyllaceae
- Genus: Marila; Sw.

Species
- 19; see text

Synonyms
- Monoporina J.Presl; Scyphaea C.Presl

= Marila =

Genus of flowering plants

Marila is a genus of flowering plants in the family Calophyllaceae. The genus comprises about 20 species, occurring in the Neotropics from Mexico and the Antilles to Bolivia.

== Species ==
19 species are accepted.

- Marila alternifolia Triana & Planch.
- Marila biflora Urb.
- Marila cespedesiana Triana & Planch.
- Marila dissitiflora C.Wright
- Marila domingensis Urb.
- Marila florenciana Cuatrec.
- Marila geminata Cuatrec.
- Marila grandiflora Griseb.
- Marila lactogena Cuatrec.
- Marila laxiflora Rusby
- Marila macrophylla Benth.
- Marila magnifica Linden & Planch.
- Marila micrantha Cuatrec.
- Marila nitida Spruce ex Benth.
- Marila podantha Cuatrec.
- Marila racemosa Sw.
- Marila saramaccana Pulle
- Marila spiciformis McDearman & S.McDaniel
- Marila tomentosa Poepp.
