= John T. Polhemus =

American entomologist

Doctor John T. Polhemus
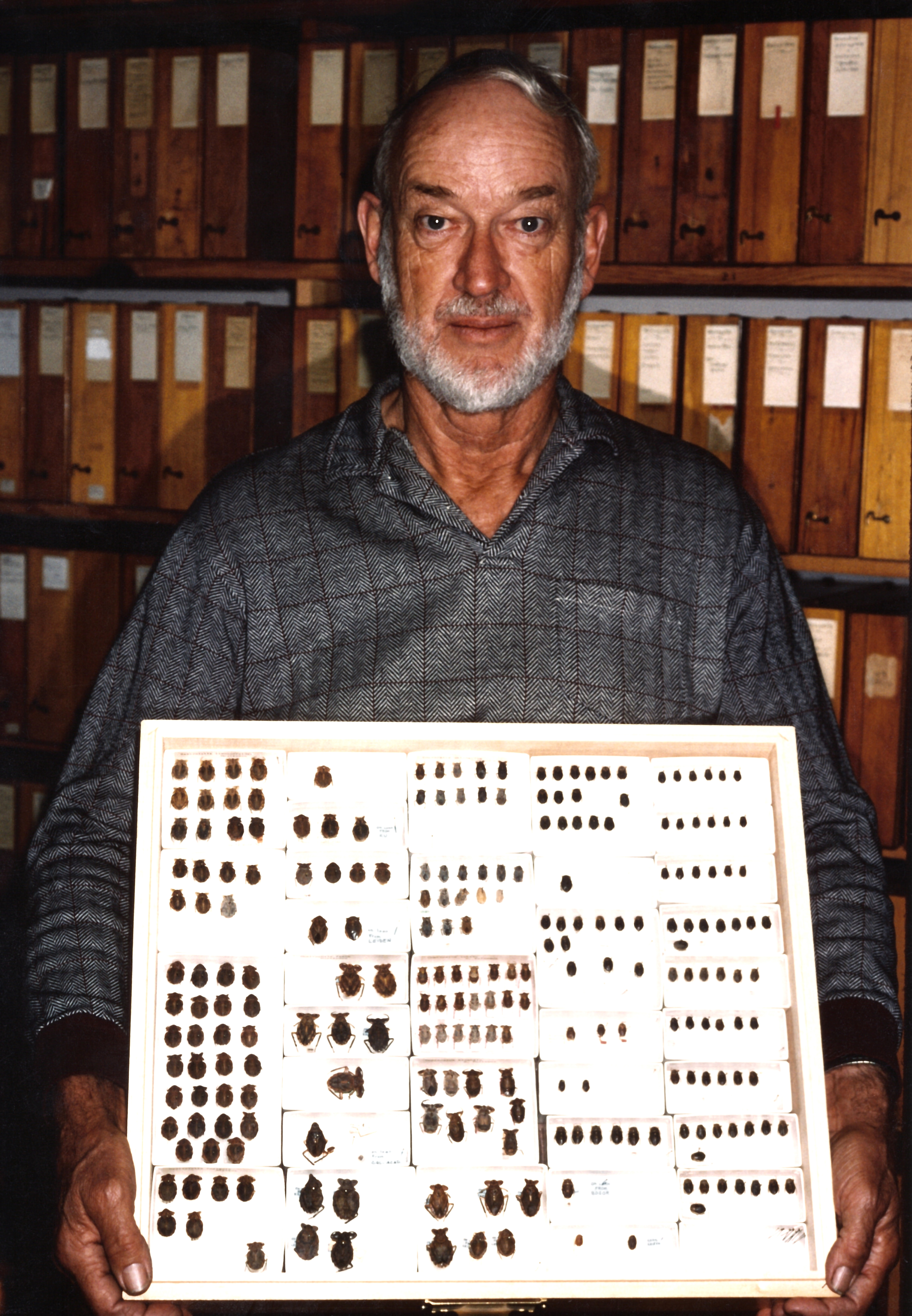
- John Thomas Polhemus, displaying mounted insects from his collection.
- Born: 11 September 1929; Ames, Iowa
- Died: 21 May 2013 (aged 83); Englewood, Colorado
- Resting place: Oakland Cemetery, Peterson Iowa
- Education: Bachelor of Science, Electrical Engineering - Iowa State University 1956; Ph.D., Biology - University of Colorado 1977
- Occupations: Entomologist, engineer
- Spouse: Irma Ruth Polhemus (Kirchner)
- Children: Dan A. Polhemus, John M. Polhemus

John Thomas Polhemus (September 11, 1929 – May 21, 2013) was an American entomologist, bio-engineer, and expert in remote sensing. Known for his research on aquatic Heteroptera (water bugs) and his contributions to NASA’s space program, Polhemus wrote 288 peer-reviewed publications and described 474 species new to science.

== Biography ==
Early Life and Education

John Polhemus was born in Ames, Iowa, as the youngest of three sons. His father, George Nelson Polhemus, was an engineer supervising operations at the Iowa Highway Commission, and his mother, Elsie Bonham Polhemus (Husted) was a former schoolteacher. John's curiosity for nature, particularly aquatic insects, was ignited during his childhood explorations of local streams. This led to an early mentorship with Dr. Carl Drake, a noted heteropterist at Iowa State University.

After graduating from Ames High School in 1947, Polhemus attended Iowa State College but left to serve in the U.S. Air Force, where he trained in radar technology. This experience prompted him to later pursue a degree in electrical engineering, which he completed with honors in 1956.

Engineering Career and NASA Contributions

Polhemus began his engineering career at the California Research Corporation, where he worked on the development of the first mass spectrometer. In 1960, he joined Martin-Marietta (now Lockheed Martin), contributing to NASA's Apollo program. His work resulted in several key patents related to bio-sensing and remote sensing technologies, which advanced both space exploration and medical technology.

Among Polhemus’s inventions are U.S. patents in biomedical sensing and instrumentation. These include the Pulse Transducer with Artifact Signal Attenuator (U.S. Patent 4,198,988), which addressed motion-induced artifacts in physiological measurements and was applied in aerospace heart-rate monitoring systems; the Condition Sensor System and Method (U.S. Patent 4,092,633), which improved motion and condition detection, including applications in assistive technologies for the visually impaired; and the Integrated Parameter Display of Galvanometer Reading (U.S. Patent 3,548,378), which enhanced real-time visualization of sensor data for scientific and aerospace instrumentation. In this period, Polhemus was head of the Display Systems Research Group at the Martin Marietta Corporation, where he conducted research on computer-compatible interactive display systems and related digital technologies.

Entomological Research and Contributions

Polhemus is best known for his work in entomology, particularly the study of aquatic Heteroptera. His scientific career was marked by extensive fieldwork, during which he collected specimens from over 67 countries across six continents. His collection is contains over half a million specimens representing 5,000 species.

John T. Polhemus authored 288 peer-reviewed publications and described 474 species, 54 genera, and 5 tribes of aquatic Heteroptera. The publication lists his extensive field collection numbers, providing future researchers with resources to associate samples and localities. His holotype repositories, containing the species-level taxa, are housed at institutions worldwide.

Polhemus’s taxonomic work earned him international recognition, and his collaborations with his son Dan furthered their shared legacy. He held numerous academic positions as a Research Associate at institutions such as the Smithsonian Institution, the American Museum of Natural History, and the University of Colorado.

Legacy and Impact

In 1985, Polhemus retired from Martin-Marietta to focus entirely on entomology. He pioneered the application of remote sensing data to biological challenges, particularly in pest control efforts for tsetse flies and screw worms.

His comprehensive insect collection, now housed at the Smithsonian Institution, remains a critical resource for entomologists worldwide. His work was an integration of engineering and biological sciences.

His son Dan has followed in his footsteps in the field of entomology.
