= Julius Rudolph Theodor Vogel =

German botanist (1812–1841)

Julius Rudolph Theodor Vogel (30 July 1812 – 17 December 1841) was a German botanist.

== Life ==
He was born in Berlin, and studied at the Friedrich Wilhelm Gymnasium. He learned botany from Johann Friedrich Ruthe. In 1837 he graduated Ph.D. from the University of Berlin with a dissertation on the genus Cassia. He was a privatdozent at Berlin and then from 1839 at the University of Bonn, where he took over duties after the death of Theodor Friedrich Ludwig Nees von Esenbeck. He worked particularly on Brazilian plants, and collaborated with Matthias Jakob Schleiden. In 1840 he worked on the collections of Franz Meyen who had just died.

At the end of 1840 he travelled to England to meet the African Civilization Society, then planning the Niger expedition of 1841. Taking two years' leave from Bonn, he joined the expedition in May 1841, on the steamer Wilberforce. He wrote letters from Sierra Leone and Accra, and left a journal of the expedition. Suffering from fever, he died on Fernando Po (now Bioko) of dysentery, on 17 December 1841.

== Works ==
At Madeira he made a herbarium with the help of Richard Thomas Lowe. He made collections in Liberia, at Cape Mesurado and elsewhere. His specimens are now at Kew Gardens.

His author abbreviation is Vogel.
