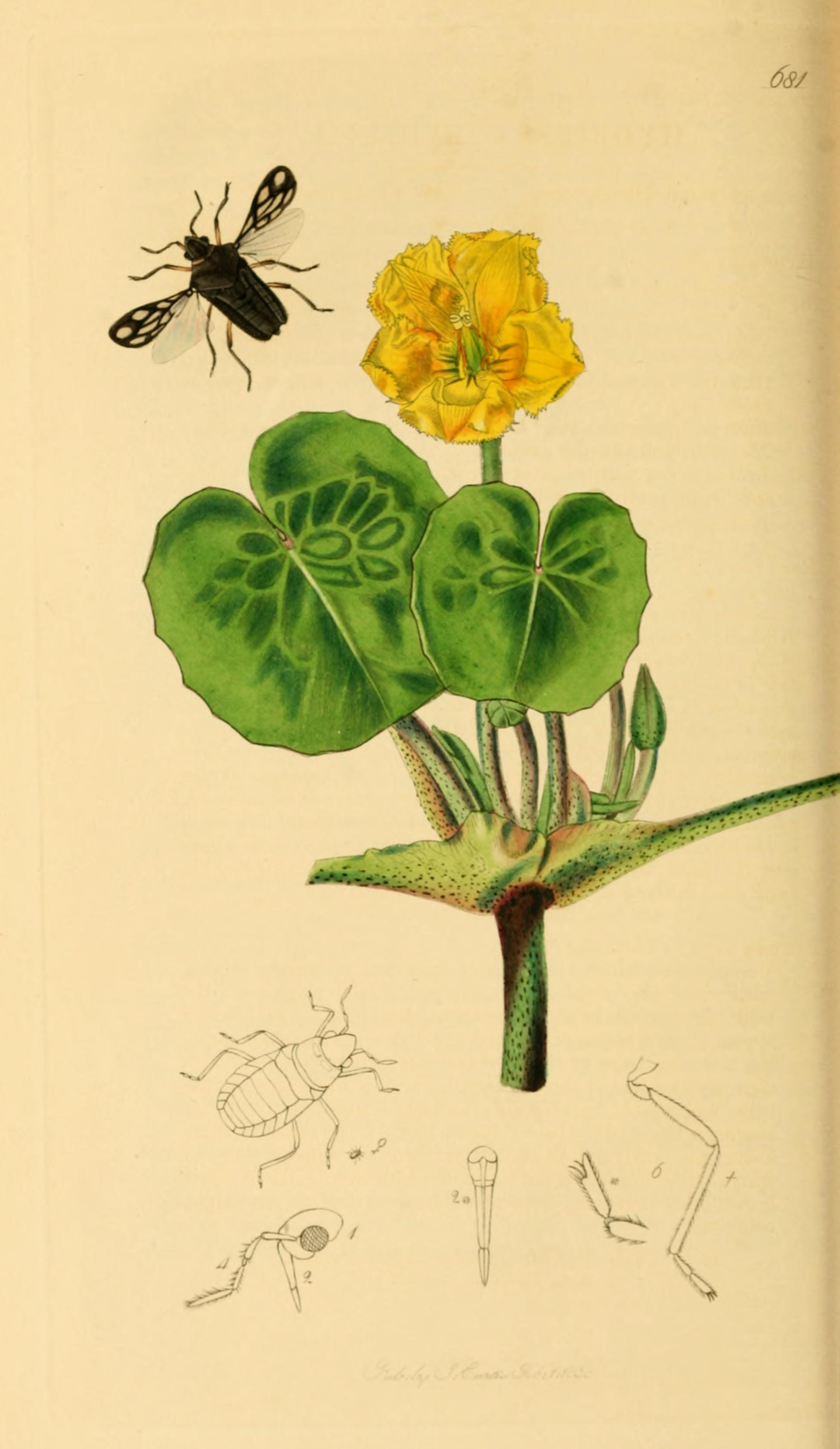
- Microvelia pygmaea illustration from British Entomology

Scientific classification
- Domain: Eukaryota
- Kingdom: Animalia
- Phylum: Arthropoda
- Class: Insecta
- Order: Hemiptera
- Suborder: Heteroptera
- Family: Veliidae
- Genus: Microvelia; Westwood, 1834

Diversity
- at least 230 species

Synonyms
- Hydroessa Burmeister, 1835; Veliomorpha Carlini, 1895

= Microvelia =

Genus of true bugs

Microvelia is a genus of aquatic bugs in the family Veliidae. There are at least 230 described species in Microvelia.

== Species ==
- List of Microvelia species

== Illustrations ==
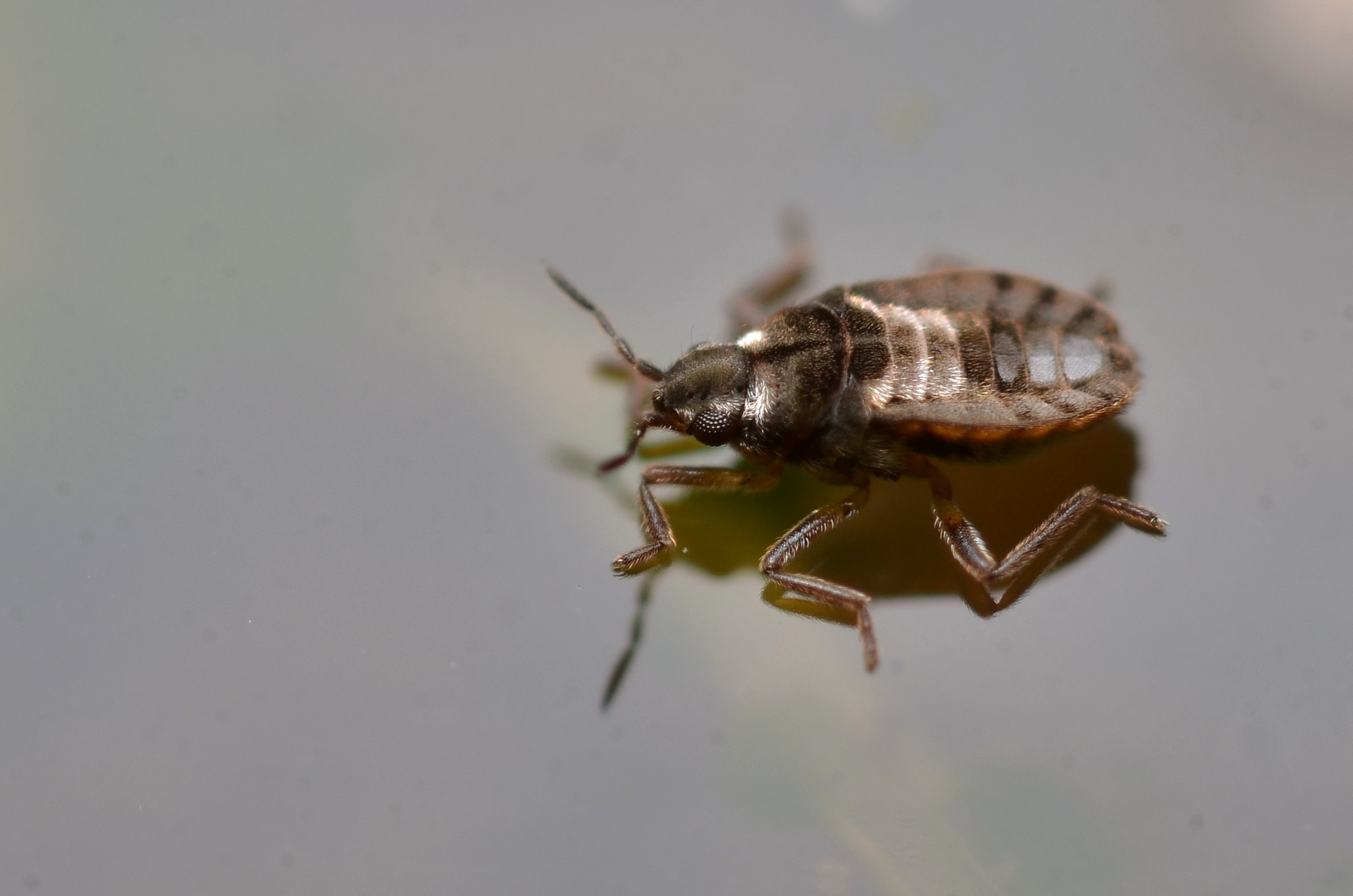
Microvelia reticultata

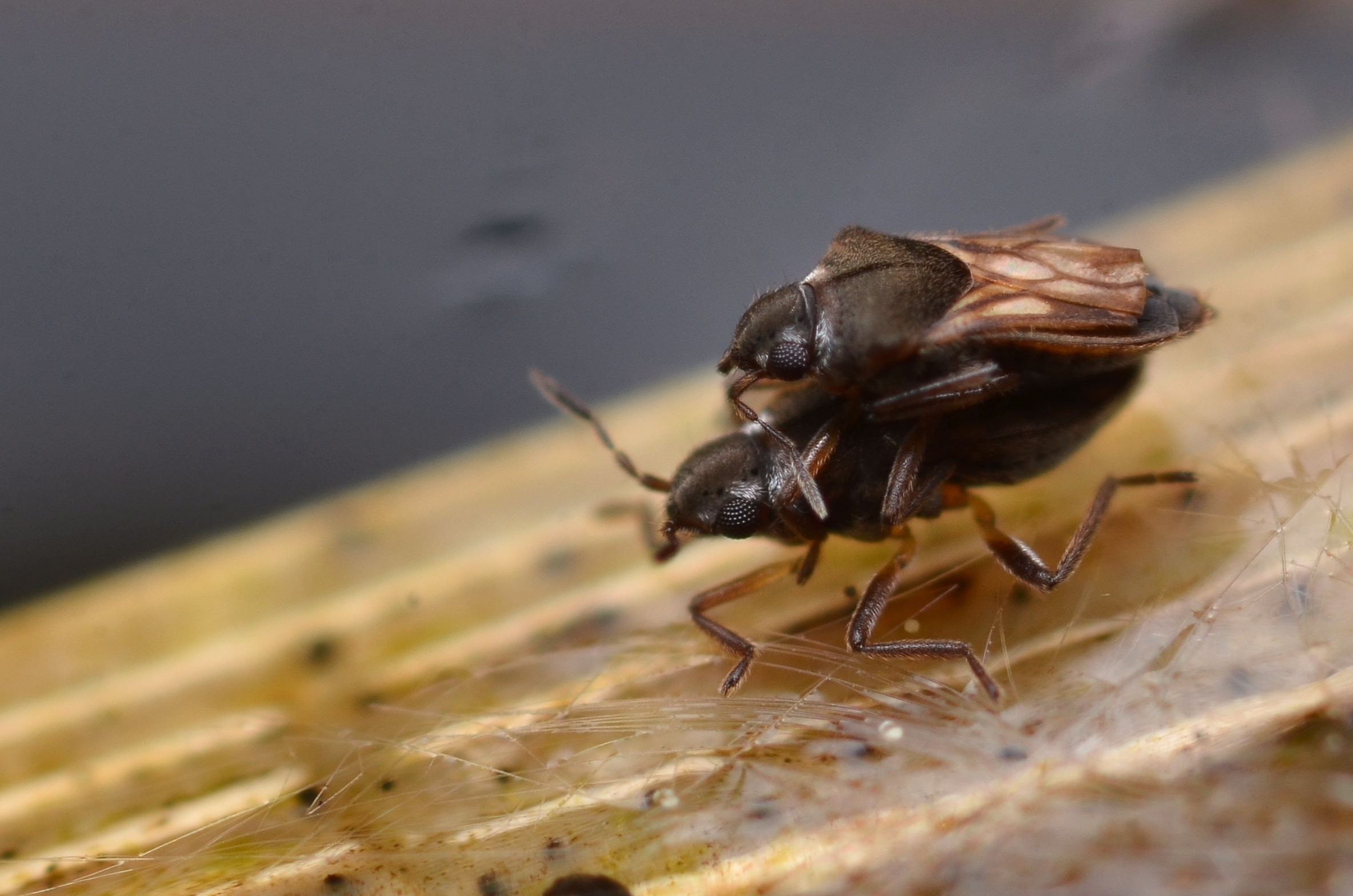
Microvelia reticultata in copula

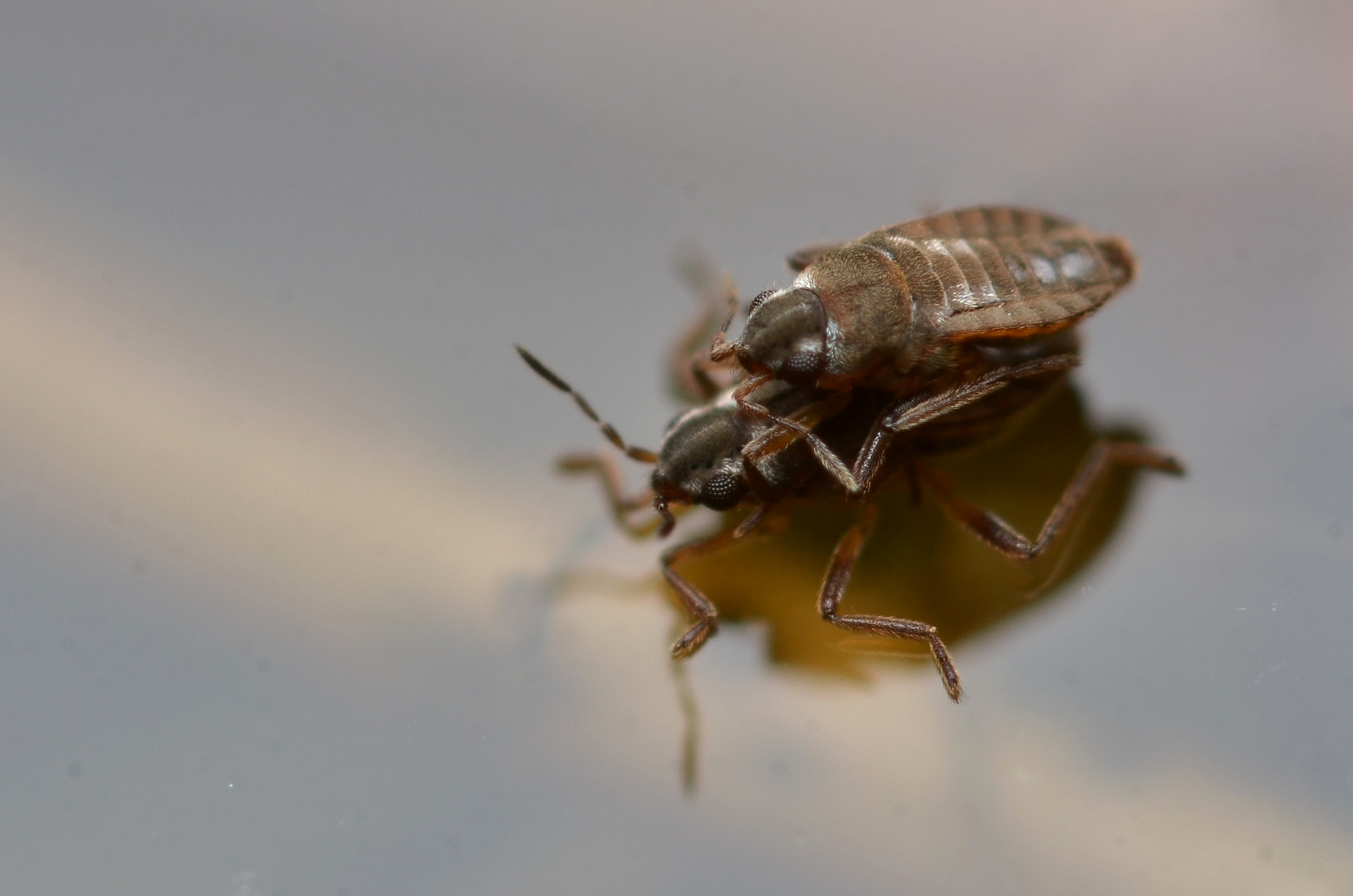
Microvelia reticultata in copula

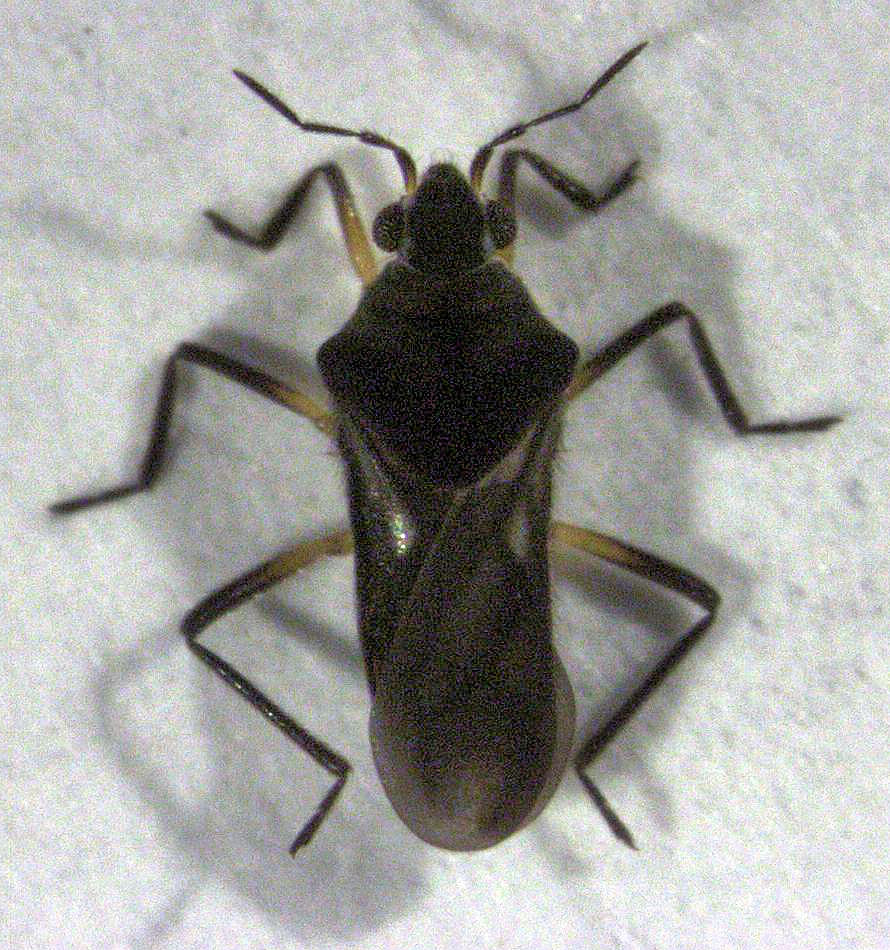
Microvelia macgregori

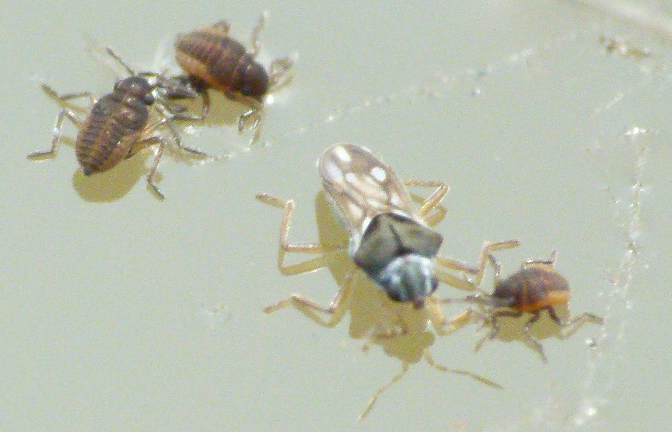
Adult and nymphs (India)
