= List of Rhagovelia species =

This is a list of 396 species in Rhagovelia, a genus of smaller water striders in the family Veliidae.

== Rhagovelia species ==
- Rhagovelia abalienata Hoberlandt, 1951^{i c g}
- Rhagovelia aberrans Andersen, 1965^{i c g}
- Rhagovelia abra Nieser, Zettel and Chen, 1997^{i c g}
- Rhagovelia abrupta Gould, 1934^{i c g}
- Rhagovelia acapulcana Drake, 1953^{i c g}
- Rhagovelia accedens Drake, 1957^{i c g}
- Rhagovelia achna Nieser, Zettel and Chen, 1997^{i c g}
- Rhagovelia acuminata Bacon, 1956^{i c g}
- Rhagovelia adrienneaebrasili Poisson, 1945^{i c g}
- Rhagovelia aeneipes Haglund, 1895^{i c g}
- Rhagovelia aestiva J. Polhemus, 1980^{i c g}
- Rhagovelia agilis J. Polhemus, 1976^{i c g}
- Rhagovelia agra Drake, 1957^{i c g}
- Rhagovelia aguaclara Padilla-Gil, 2010^{i c g}
- Rhagovelia ainsliei Drake and Harris, 1933^{i c g}
- Rhagovelia aiuruoca Moreira and Ribeiro, 2009^{i c g}
- Rhagovelia akrita J. Polhemus in J. Polhemus and Reisen, 1976^{i c g}
- Rhagovelia amazonensis Gould, 1931^{i c g}
- Rhagovelia ambonensis Lundblad, 1936^{i c g}
- Rhagovelia ambra D. Polhemus and Andersen, 2015^{i c g}
- Rhagovelia amnica Lansbury, 1993^{i c g}
- Rhagovelia andaman J. Polhemus, 1990^{i c g}
- Rhagovelia anderseni D. Polhemus, 1997^{i c g}
- Rhagovelia andringitrae D. Polhemus and Andersen, 2015^{i c g}
- Rhagovelia angulata D. Polhemus and Andersen, 2010^{i c g}
- Rhagovelia angustipes Uhler, 1894^{i c g}
- Rhagovelia antilleana D. Polhemus, 1997^{i c g}
- Rhagovelia antioquiae D. Polhemus, 1997^{i c g}
- Rhagovelia aquacola D. Polhemus and Andersen, 2015^{i c g}
- Rhagovelia arcuata (J. Polhemus and Manzano, 1992)^{i c g}
- Rhagovelia armata (Burmeister, 1835)^{i c g}
- Rhagovelia atrispina J. Polhemus, 1977^{i c g}
- Rhagovelia aureospicata Lansbury, 1993^{i c g}
- Rhagovelia australica Kirkaldy, 1908^{i c g}
- Rhagovelia azulita Padilla-Gil, 2009^{i c g}
- Rhagovelia bacanensis J. Polhemus and D. Polhemus, 1988^{i c g}
- Rhagovelia baconi D. Polhemus, 1997^{i c g}
- Rhagovelia bakeri Bergroth, 1914^{i c g}
- Rhagovelia barbacoensis ^{g}
- Rhagovelia batantana D. Polhemus and J. Polhemus, 2011^{i c g}
- Rhagovelia beangonyi Poisson, 1952^{i c g}
- Rhagovelia becki Drake and Harris, 1936^{i c g}
- Rhagovelia bicolana Zettel, 2014^{i c g}
- Rhagovelia bipennicillata Lundblad, 1936^{i c g}
- Rhagovelia biroi Lundblad, 1936^{i c g}
- Rhagovelia bisignata Bacon, 1948^{i c g}
- Rhagovelia blogiokommena Nieser and Chen, 1993^{i c g}
- Rhagovelia bocaina Moreira and Ribeiro, 2009^{i c g}
- Rhagovelia boliviana D. Polhemus, 1997^{i c g}
- Rhagovelia borneensis J. Polhemus and D. Polhemus, 1988^{i c g}
- Rhagovelia brincki D. Polhemus and Andersen, 2015^{i c g}
- Rhagovelia browni Lansbury, 1993^{i c g}
- Rhagovelia brunae Magalhães and Moreira in Magalhães et al., 2016^{i c g}
- Rhagovelia brunipes Zettel, 2006^{i c g}
- Rhagovelia buesaquensis Padilla-Gil, 2009^{i c g}
- Rhagovelia cachipai Padilla-Gil, 2011^{i c g}
- Rhagovelia caesia Lansbury, 1993^{i c g}
- Rhagovelia calcarea D. Polhemus and J. Polhemus, 2011^{i c g}
- Rhagovelia calcaris Drake and Harris, 1935^{i c g}
- Rhagovelia calceola Padilla-Gil, 2011^{i c g}
- Rhagovelia cali D. Polhemus, 1997^{i c g}
- Rhagovelia callida Drake and Harris, 1935^{i c g}
- Rhagovelia calopa Drake and Harris, 1927^{i c g}
- Rhagovelia camiguinana Zettel, 1996^{i c g}
- Rhagovelia canlaonensis Zettel, 1996^{i c g}
- Rhagovelia cardia Padilla-Gil, 2011^{i c g}
- Rhagovelia caribbeana D. Polhemus, 1997^{i c g}
- Rhagovelia carina ^{g}
- Rhagovelia castanea Gould, 1931^{i c g}
- Rhagovelia catemaco D. Polhemus, 1997^{i c g}
- Rhagovelia cauca D. Polhemus, 1997^{i c g}
- Rhagovelia caunapi ^{g}
- Rhagovelia celebensis J. Polhemus and D. Polhemus, 1988^{i c g}
- Rhagovelia cenizae Zettel, 2007^{i c g}
- Rhagovelia cephala Padilla-Gil, 2009^{i c g}
- Rhagovelia ceylanica Lundblad, 1936^{i c g}
- Rhagovelia chac D. Polhemus and Chordas, 2010^{i c g}
- Rhagovelia chiapensis J. Polhemus, 1980^{i c g}
- Rhagovelia chiriqui D. Polhemus, 1997^{i c g}
- Rhagovelia choreutes Hussey, 1925^{i c g b}
- Rhagovelia christenseni J. Polhemus and D. Polhemus, 1988^{i c g}
- Rhagovelia chrysomalla Nieser and Chen, 1993^{i c g}
- Rhagovelia cimarrona Padilla-Gil, 2011^{i c g}
- Rhagovelia citata Drake, 1953^{i c g}
- Rhagovelia collaris (Burmeister, 1835)^{i c g}
- Rhagovelia colombiana (J. Polhemus and Manzano, 1992)^{i c g}
- Rhagovelia compacta D. Polhemus and Andersen, 2010^{i c g}
- Rhagovelia cotabatoensis Hungerford and Matsuda, 1961^{i c g}
- Rhagovelia crassipes Champion, 1898^{i c g}
- Rhagovelia crinita Lansbury, 1993^{i c g}
- Rhagovelia cubana D. Polhemus, 1997^{i c g}
- Rhagovelia culebrana Drake and Maldonado-Capriles, 1952^{i c g}
- Rhagovelia cuspidis Drake and Harris, 1933^{i c g}
- Rhagovelia cylindros Nieser, Zettel and Chen, 1997^{i c g}
- Rhagovelia daktylophora Nieser and Chen, 1993^{i c g}
- Rhagovelia danpolhemi Moreira, Pacheco-Chaves and Cordeiro in Moreira et al., 2015^{i c g}
- Rhagovelia deigmena Padilla-Gil, 2009^{i c g}
- Rhagovelia deminuta Bacon, 1948^{i c g}
- Rhagovelia diabolica Poisson, 1951^{i c g}
- Rhagovelia dilatissima Sallier Dupin, 1976^{i c g}
- Rhagovelia distincta Champion, 1898^{i c g b}
- Rhagovelia divisoensis Padilla-Gil, 2012^{i c g}
- Rhagovelia dostali Zettel, 2009^{i c g}
- Rhagovelia doveri Lundblad, 1933^{i c g}
- Rhagovelia drakei D. Polhemus, 1997^{i c g}
- Rhagovelia elegans Uhler, 1894^{i c g}
- Rhagovelia enckelli D. Polhemus and Andersen, 2015^{i c g}
- Rhagovelia ephydros (Drake and Van Doesburg, 1966)^{i c g}
- Rhagovelia equatoria D. Polhemus, 1997^{i c g}
- Rhagovelia esakii Lundblad, 1937^{i c g}
- Rhagovelia espriella Padilla-Gil, 2011^{i c g}
- Rhagovelia estrella Zettel, 1994^{i c g}
- Rhagovelia evidis Bacon, 1948^{i c g}
- Rhagovelia faratsihoi D. Polhemus and Andersen, 2015^{i c g}
- Rhagovelia femoralis Champion, 1898^{i c g}
- Rhagovelia femorata Dover, 1928^{i c g}
- Rhagovelia festae Kirkaldy, 1899^{i c g}
- Rhagovelia fischeri Zettel, 1999^{i c g}
- Rhagovelia fontanalis Bacon, 1948^{i c g}
- Rhagovelia formosa Bacon, 1956^{i c g}
- Rhagovelia froeschneri D. Polhemus, 1997^{i c g}
- Rhagovelia fulva Lansbury, 1993^{i c g}
- Rhagovelia gaigei Drake and Hussey, 1957^{i c g}
- Rhagovelia gastrotricha Padilla-Gil, 2011^{i c g}
- Rhagovelia gorgona Manzano, Nieser and Caicedo, 1995^{i c g}
- Rhagovelia graindli Zettel, 2012^{i c g}
- Rhagovelia grandis Padilla-Gil, 2011^{i c g}
- Rhagovelia grayi J. Polhemus and D. Polhemus, 1988^{i c g}
- Rhagovelia gregalis Drake and Harris, 1927^{i c g}
- Rhagovelia guentheri Zettel, 2007^{i c g}
- Rhagovelia guianana D. Polhemus, 1997^{i c g}
- Rhagovelia gyrista Nieser, Zettel and Chen, 1997^{i c g}
- Rhagovelia hambletoni Drake and Harris, 1933^{i c g}
- Rhagovelia hamdjahi J. Polhemus and D. Polhemus, 1988^{i c g}
- Rhagovelia heissi Zettel and Bongo, 2006^{i c g}
- Rhagovelia henryi D. Polhemus, 1997^{i c g}
- Rhagovelia herzogensis Lansbury, 1993^{i c g}
- Rhagovelia hirsuta Lansbury, 1993^{i c g}
- Rhagovelia hirtipes Drake and Harris, 1927^{i c g}
- Rhagovelia hirtipoides D. Polhemus, 1997^{i c g}
- Rhagovelia hoogstraali Hungerford and Matsuda, 1961^{i c g}
- Rhagovelia horaia Nieser and Chen, 1993^{i c g}
- Rhagovelia hovana Hoberlandt, 1941^{i c g}
- Rhagovelia huila Padilla-Gil, 2009^{i c g}
- Rhagovelia humboldti D. Polhemus, 1997^{i c g}
- Rhagovelia hutchinsoni Lundblad, 1933^{i c g}
- Rhagovelia hynesi Poisson, 1949^{i c g}
- Rhagovelia ignota Drake and Harris, 1933^{i c g}
- Rhagovelia imitatrix Bacon, 1948^{i c g}
- Rhagovelia impensa Bacon, 1956^{i c g}
- Rhagovelia imperatrix Padilla-Gil, 2011^{i c g}
- Rhagovelia incognita J. Polhemus and D. Polhemus, 1988^{i c g}
- Rhagovelia inexpectata Zettel, 2000^{i c g}
- Rhagovelia infernalis (Butler, 1876)^{i c g}
- Rhagovelia ingleae Zettel, 2012^{i c g}
- Rhagovelia itatiaiana Drake, 1953^{i c g}
- Rhagovelia itremoi Poisson, 1952^{i c g}
- Rhagovelia jagua ^{g}
- Rhagovelia jaliscoana D. Polhemus, 1997^{i c g}
- Rhagovelia janeira Drake, 1953^{i c g}
- Rhagovelia johnpolhemi D. Polhemus, 1997^{i c g}
- Rhagovelia jubata Bacon, 1948^{i c g}
- Rhagovelia kalami Nieser and Chen, 1993^{i c g}
- Rhagovelia kararao Burguez Floriano and Moreira, 2015^{i c g}
- Rhagovelia karunaratnei J. Polhemus, 1979^{i c g}
- Rhagovelia kastanoparuphe Nieser and Chen, 1993^{i c g}
- Rhagovelia kawakamii (Matsumura, 1913)^{i c g}
- Rhagovelia knighti Drake and Harris, 1927^{i c g}
- Rhagovelia krama Nieser, Zettel and Chen, 1997^{i c g}
- Rhagovelia lansburyi Zettel, 1995^{i c g}
- Rhagovelia leyteensis Zettel, 1996^{i c g}
- Rhagovelia linnavuorii Sallier Dupin, 1979^{i c g}
- Rhagovelia longipes Gould, 1931^{i c g}
- Rhagovelia lorelinduana J. Polhemus and D. Polhemus, 1988^{i c g}
- Rhagovelia lucida Gould, 1931^{i c g}
- Rhagovelia lugubris Lundblad, 1933^{i c g}
- Rhagovelia lundbladi Hungerford and Matsuda, 1961^{i c g}
- Rhagovelia luzonica Lundblad, 1937^{i c g}
- Rhagovelia macarena D. Polhemus, 1997^{i c g}
- Rhagovelia macta Drake and Carvalho, 1955^{i c g}
- Rhagovelia maculata Distant, 1903^{i c g}
- Rhagovelia madagascariensis Hoberlandt, 1941^{i c g}
- Rhagovelia madari Hoberlandt, 1941^{i c g}
- Rhagovelia madecassa D. Polhemus and Andersen, 2010^{i c g}
- Rhagovelia magdalena Padilla-Gil, 2011^{i c g}
- Rhagovelia malkini D. Polhemus, 1997^{i c g}
- Rhagovelia manamboloi Poisson, 1952^{i c g}
- Rhagovelia manankazo D. Polhemus and Andersen, 2010^{i c g}
- Rhagovelia mancinii Poisson, 1955^{i c g}
- Rhagovelia mandraka D. Polhemus and Andersen, 2015^{i c g}
- Rhagovelia manga D. Polhemus and Andersen, 2015^{i c g}
- Rhagovelia mangaratiba Moreira, Barbosa and Ribeiro, 2012^{i c g}
- Rhagovelia mangle Moreira, Nessimian and Rúdio in Moreira et al., 2010^{i c g}
- Rhagovelia manzanoi D. Polhemus, 1997^{i c g}
- Rhagovelia marinduquensis Zettel, 2012^{i c g}
- Rhagovelia maya D. Polhemus, 1997^{i c g}
- Rhagovelia meikdelyi J. Polhemus and D. Polhemus, 1988^{i c g}
- Rhagovelia melanopsis J. Polhemus and D. Polhemus, 1988^{i c g}
- Rhagovelia merga Bacon, 1956^{i c g}
- Rhagovelia milloti Poisson, 1948^{i c g}
- Rhagovelia minahasa J. Polhemus and D. Polhemus, 1988^{i c g}
- Rhagovelia mindanaoensis Hungerford and Matsuda, 1961^{i c g}
- Rhagovelia mindoroensis Zettel, 1994^{i c g}
- Rhagovelia minuta Lundblad, 1936^{i c g}
- Rhagovelia minutissima Hungerford and Matsuda, 1961^{i c g}
- Rhagovelia mira Drake and Harris, 1938^{i c g}
- Rhagovelia misoolana D. Polhemus and J. Polhemus, 2011^{i c g}
- Rhagovelia mixteca D. Polhemus, 1997^{i c g}
- Rhagovelia mocoa ^{g}
- Rhagovelia modesta Bacon, 1956^{i c g}
- Rhagovelia mohelii Poisson, 1959^{i c g}
- Rhagovelia mondena D. Polhemus and Andersen, 2015^{i c g}
- Rhagovelia narinensis Padilla-Gil, 2011^{i c g}
- Rhagovelia negrosensis Zettel, 1995^{i c g}
- Rhagovelia nicolai Padilla-Gil, 2011^{i c g}
- Rhagovelia nieseri Zettel, 1995^{i c g}
- Rhagovelia nigra Hungerford, 1933^{i c g}
- Rhagovelia nigranota D. Polhemus and Chordas, 2003^{i c g}
- Rhagovelia nigricans (Burmeister, 1835)^{i c g}
- Rhagovelia nilgiriensis Thirumalai, 1994^{i c g}
- Rhagovelia nitida Bacon, 1948^{i c g}
- Rhagovelia novacaledonica Lundblad, 1936^{i c g}
- Rhagovelia novahispaniae D. Polhemus, 1997^{i c g}
- Rhagovelia novana Drake, 1953^{i c g}
- Rhagovelia oaxtepec D. Polhemus, 1997^{i c g}
- Rhagovelia obesa Uhler, 1871^{i c g b}
- Rhagovelia obi J. Polhemus and D. Polhemus, 1988^{i c g}
- Rhagovelia occulcata Drake, 1959^{i c g}
- Rhagovelia ochra Nieser, Zettel and Chen, 1997^{i c g}
- Rhagovelia ochroischion Nieser and D. Polhemus, 1999^{i c g}
- Rhagovelia oporapa Padilla-Gil, 2009^{i c g}
- Rhagovelia oriander Parshley, 1922^{i c g}
- Rhagovelia orientalis Lundblad, 1937^{i c g}
- Rhagovelia orientaloides Zettel, 1995^{i c g}
- Rhagovelia origami D. Polhemus and Andersen, 2010^{i c g}
- Rhagovelia ornata Bacon, 1948^{i c g}
- Rhagovelia pacayana Drake and Carvalho, 1955^{i c g}
- Rhagovelia pacifica Padilla-Gil, 2011^{i c g}
- Rhagovelia palawanensis Zettel, 1994^{i c g}
- Rhagovelia palea Bacon, 1956^{i c g}
- Rhagovelia pallida Lundblad, 1936^{i c g}
- Rhagovelia panamensis D. Polhemus, 1997^{i c g}
- Rhagovelia panayensis Zettel, 1995^{i c g}
- Rhagovelia panda Drake and Harris, 1935^{i c g}
- Rhagovelia papuensis Lundblad, 1936^{i c g}
- Rhagovelia paulana Drake, 1953^{i c g}
- Rhagovelia pediformis Padilla-Gil, 2010^{i c g}
- Rhagovelia peggiae Kirkaldy, 1901^{i c g}
- Rhagovelia penta ^{g}
- Rhagovelia perfecta D. Polhemus, 1997^{i c g}
- Rhagovelia perija D. Polhemus, 1997^{i c g}
- Rhagovelia pexa Hoberlandt, 1941^{i c g}
- Rhagovelia philippina Lundblad, 1936^{i c g}
- Rhagovelia phoretica D. Polhemus, 1995^{i c g}
- Rhagovelia pidaxa J. Polhemus and Herring, 1970^{i c g}
- Rhagovelia plana Drake and Harris, 1933^{i c g}
- Rhagovelia planipes Gould, 1931^{i c g}
- Rhagovelia plaumanni D. Polhemus, 1997^{i c g}
- Rhagovelia plumbea Uhler, 1894^{i c g b}
- Rhagovelia plychona Nieser, Zettel and Chen, 1997^{i c g}
- Rhagovelia polhemi Y. C. Gupta and Khandelwal, 2004^{i c g}
- Rhagovelia polymorpha Zettel and Tran, 2004^{i c g}
- Rhagovelia potamophila Zettel, 1996^{i c g}
- Rhagovelia priori Lansbury, 1993^{i c g}
- Rhagovelia problematica Zettel, 2006^{i c g}
- Rhagovelia pruinosa J. Polhemus and D. Polhemus, 1988^{i c g}
- Rhagovelia pseudocelebensis Nieser and Chen, 1993^{i c g}
- Rhagovelia pseudotijuca Moreira and Barbosa, 2011^{i c g}
- Rhagovelia pulchra Gould, 1931^{i c g}
- Rhagovelia quilichaensis Padilla-Gil, 2011^{i c g}
- Rhagovelia raddai Zettel, 1994^{i c g}
- Rhagovelia rajana D. Polhemus and J. Polhemus, 2011^{i c g}
- Rhagovelia ramphus Padilla-Gil, 2009^{i c g}
- Rhagovelia ranau J. Polhemus and D. Polhemus, 1988^{i c g}
- Rhagovelia ravana Kirkaldy, 1902^{i c g}
- Rhagovelia raymondi Zettel, 1995^{i c g}
- Rhagovelia reclusa D. Polhemus, 1997^{i c g}
- Rhagovelia regalis Drake and Harris, 1927^{i c g}
- Rhagovelia reitteri Reuter, 1882^{i c g}
- Rhagovelia relicta Gould, 1931^{i c g}
- Rhagovelia reuteri Hoberlandt, 1951^{i c g}
- Rhagovelia ridicula D. Polhemus, 1995^{i c g}
- Rhagovelia rigovae Zettel, 2012^{i c g}
- Rhagovelia rioana Drake, 1953^{i c g}
- Rhagovelia ripithes D. Polhemus, 1997^{i c g}
- Rhagovelia rivale Torre-bueno, 1924^{i c g b}
- Rhagovelia rivulosa J. Polhemus and D. Polhemus, 1985^{i c g}
- Rhagovelia robina Nieser and Chen, 1993^{i c g}
- Rhagovelia robusta Gould, 1931^{i c g}
- Rhagovelia roldani D. Polhemus, 1997^{i c g}
- Rhagovelia rosarensis Padilla-Gil, 2010^{i c g}
- Rhagovelia rosensis Padilla-Gil, 2011^{i c g}
- Rhagovelia rubra D. Polhemus, 1997^{i c g}
- Rhagovelia rudischuhi Zettel, 1993^{i c g}
- Rhagovelia rufescens Zettel, 2012^{i c g}
- Rhagovelia sabela J. Polhemus and D. Polhemus, 1988^{i c g}
- Rhagovelia sabrina Drake, 1958^{i c g}
- Rhagovelia sahabe D. Polhemus and Andersen, 2015^{i c g}
- Rhagovelia salawati D. Polhemus and J. Polhemus, 2011^{i c g}
- Rhagovelia salina (Champion, 1898)^{i c g}
- Rhagovelia sallyae Zettel, 2003^{i c g}
- Rhagovelia samardaca J. Polhemus and D. Polhemus, 1988^{i c g}
- Rhagovelia samarinda J. Polhemus and D. Polhemus, 1988^{i c g}
- Rhagovelia sandoka D. Polhemus and Andersen, 2015^{i c g}
- Rhagovelia santanderi ^{g}
- Rhagovelia saotomae (Sallier Dupin, 1976)^{i c g}
- Rhagovelia sarawakensis J. Polhemus and D. Polhemus, 1988^{i c g}
- Rhagovelia sbolos Nieser and D. Polhemus, 1999^{i c g}
- Rhagovelia scabra Bacon, 1956^{i c g}
- Rhagovelia schoedli Zettel, 1996^{i c g}
- Rhagovelia scitula Bacon, 1956^{i c g}
- Rhagovelia sculpturata D. Polhemus and Andersen, 2010^{i c g}
- Rhagovelia secluda Drake and Maldonado-Capriles, 1956^{i c g}
- Rhagovelia sehnali Buzzetti and Zettel, 2007^{i c g}
- Rhagovelia seychellensis Lundblad, 1936^{i c g}
- Rhagovelia seyferti Zettel, 1995^{i c g}
- Rhagovelia sibuyana Zettel, 1996^{i c g}
- Rhagovelia silau J. Polhemus and D. Polhemus, 1988^{i c g}
- Rhagovelia simulata J. Polhemus and D. Polhemus, 1988^{i c g}
- Rhagovelia singaporensis Yang and D. Polhemus, 1994^{i c g}
- Rhagovelia sinuata Gould, 1931^{i c g}
- Rhagovelia skoura Nieser, Zettel and Chen, 1997^{i c g}
- Rhagovelia solida Bacon, 1956^{i c g}
- Rhagovelia sondaica J. Polhemus and D. Polhemus, 1988^{i c g}
- Rhagovelia sooretama Moreira, Nessimian and Rúdio in Moreira et al., 2010^{i c g}
- Rhagovelia sorsogonensis Zettel, 2014^{i c g}
- Rhagovelia spinigera Champion, 1898^{i c g}
- Rhagovelia spinosa Gould, 1931^{i c g}
- Rhagovelia springerae Moreira, Pacheco-Chaves and Cordeiro in Moreira et al., 2015^{i c g}
- Rhagovelia starmuehlneri J. Polhemus, 1990^{i c g}
- Rhagovelia sterea Nieser, Zettel and Chen, 1997^{i c g}
- Rhagovelia stibea Drake, 1958^{i c g}
- Rhagovelia styx D. Polhemus and J. Polhemus, 2011^{i c g}
- Rhagovelia suarezensis D. Polhemus and Andersen, 2010^{i c g}
- Rhagovelia sulawesiana J. Polhemus and D. Polhemus, 1988^{i c g}
- Rhagovelia sumaldei Zettel, 2012^{i c g}
- Rhagovelia sumatrensis Lundblad, 1933^{i c g}
- Rhagovelia tablasensis Zettel, 1996^{i c g}
- Rhagovelia takona D. Polhemus and Andersen, 2015^{i c g}
- Rhagovelia tansiongcoi Zettel, 1995^{i c g}
- Rhagovelia tantilla Drake and Harris, 1933^{i c g}
- Rhagovelia tarahumara D. Polhemus, 1997^{i c g}
- Rhagovelia tawau J. Polhemus and D. Polhemus, 1988^{i c g}
- Rhagovelia tayloriella Kirkaldy, 1900^{i c g}
- Rhagovelia tebakang J. Polhemus and D. Polhemus, 1988^{i c g}
- Rhagovelia tenuipes Champion, 1898^{i c g}
- Rhagovelia teresa Moreira, Nessimian and Rúdio in Moreira et al., 2010^{i c g}
- Rhagovelia tesari Hoberlandt, 1941^{i c g}
- Rhagovelia thaumana Drake, 1958^{i c g}
- Rhagovelia thysanotos Lansbury, 1993^{i c g}
- Rhagovelia tibialis Lundblad, 1936^{i c g}
- Rhagovelia tijuca D. Polhemus, 1997^{i c g}
- Rhagovelia torquata Bacon, 1948^{i c g}
- Rhagovelia torreyana Bacon, 1956^{i c g}
- Rhagovelia tozeur Baena, Nieser and Gallardo, 1994^{i c g}
- Rhagovelia traili (Buchanan-White, 1879)^{i c g}
- Rhagovelia transbintuni D. Polhemus and J. Polhemus, 2011^{i c g}
- Rhagovelia trepida Bacon, 1948^{i c g}
- Rhagovelia triangula Drake, 1953^{i c g}
- Rhagovelia trianguloides Nieser and D. Polhemus, 1999^{i c g}
- Rhagovelia trichota Nieser and Chen, 1993^{i c g}
- Rhagovelia tricoma ^{g}
- Rhagovelia trista Gould, 1931^{i c g}
- Rhagovelia tropidata Nieser and Chen, 1993^{i c g}
- Rhagovelia tsaratananae Poisson, 1952^{i c g}
- Rhagovelia tsecuri Padilla-Gil, 2009^{i c g}
- Rhagovelia tsouloufi Nieser, Zettel and Chen, 1997^{i c g}
- Rhagovelia tumaquensis ^{g}
- Rhagovelia turmalis Nieser and D. Polhemus, 1999^{i c g}
- Rhagovelia ullrichi Zettel, 2001^{i c g}
- Rhagovelia umbria ^{g}
- Rhagovelia uncinata Champion, 1898^{i c g}
- Rhagovelia unica J. Polhemus and D. Polhemus, 1988^{i c g}
- Rhagovelia usingeri Hungerford and Matsuda, 1961^{i c g}
- Rhagovelia vaniniae Moreira, Nessimian and Rúdio in Moreira et al., 2010^{i c g}
- Rhagovelia varipes Champion, 1898^{i c g}
- Rhagovelia vega Padilla-Gil, 2011^{i c g}
- Rhagovelia vegana Drake and Maldonado-Capriles, 1956^{i c g}
- Rhagovelia velocis Drake and Harris, 1935^{i c g}
- Rhagovelia venezuelana D. Polhemus, 1997^{i c g}
- Rhagovelia versuta Drake and Harris, 1935^{i c g}
- Rhagovelia victoria Padilla-Gil, 2012^{i c g}
- Rhagovelia viriosa Bacon, 1956^{i c g}
- Rhagovelia vivata Bacon, 1948^{i c g}
- Rhagovelia vonprahli Manzano, Nieser and Caicedo, 1995^{i c g}
- Rhagovelia wallacei J. Polhemus and D. Polhemus, 1988^{i c g}
- Rhagovelia wenzeli D. Polhemus and Andersen, 2015^{i c g}
- Rhagovelia werneri Hungerford and Matsuda, 1961^{i c g}
- Rhagovelia whitei (Breddin, 1898)^{i c g}
- Rhagovelia williamsi Gould, 1931^{i c g}
- Rhagovelia yacuivana Drake, 1958^{i c g}
- Rhagovelia yangae Zettel and Tran, 2004^{i c g}
- Rhagovelia yanomamo D. Polhemus, 1997^{i c g}
- Rhagovelia zecai Moreira and Barbosa, 2014^{i c g}
- Rhagovelia zela Drake, 1959^{i c g}
- Rhagovelia zeteki Drake, 1953^{i c g}

Data sources: i = ITIS, c = Catalogue of Life, g = GBIF, b = Bugguide.net
