= List of Hebrus species =

These 163 species belong to Hebrus, a genus of velvet water bugs in the family Hebridae.

== Hebrus species ==
- Hebrus acutiscutatus Brown, 1951^{i g}
- Hebrus adrienneaebrasili Poisson, 1944^{i g}
- Hebrus africanus Poisson, 1934^{i g}
- Hebrus alaotranus Poisson, 1949^{i g}
- Hebrus alluaudi Poisson, 1944^{i g}
- Hebrus angolensis Hoberlandt, 1951^{i g}
- Hebrus anjouani Poisson, 1959^{i g}
- Hebrus antinous Linnavuori, 1981^{i g}
- Hebrus aristomides Linnavuori, 1981^{i g}
- Hebrus arkhippe Cobben and Linnavuori, 1983^{i g}
- Hebrus atlas Kment, Jindra and Berchi, 2016^{i g}
- Hebrus atratus (Distant, 1909)^{i g}
- Hebrus axillaris Horváth, 1902^{i g}
- Hebrus baigomi Poisson, 1951^{i g}
- Hebrus balnearis Bergroth, 1918^{i g}
- Hebrus beameri Porter, 1952^{i c g}
- Hebrus bengalensis Distant, 1909^{i g}
- Hebrus bergrothi Horváth, 1929^{i g}
- Hebrus berononoi Poisson, 1952^{i g}
- Hebrus bertrandi Poisson, 1960^{i g}
- Hebrus bilineatus Champion, 1898^{i g}
- Hebrus bimaculatus Cobben, 1982^{i g}
- Hebrus birmensis Zettel, 2011^{i g}
- Hebrus bituberculatus Zettel, 2006^{i g}
- Hebrus bombayensis Paiva, 1919^{i g}
- Hebrus boukali Zettel, 2000^{i g}
- Hebrus browni Poisson, 1956^{i g}
- Hebrus buenoi Drake & Harris, 1943^{i c g b} (Bueno's velvet water bug)
- Hebrus burmeisteri Lethierry & Severin, 1896^{i c g b}
- Hebrus caeruleus Poisson, 1934^{i g}
- Hebrus campestris Linnavuori, 1971^{i g}
- Hebrus camposi Drake and Chapman, 1954^{i g}
- Hebrus carayoni Poisson, 1951^{i g}
- Hebrus catus Drake and Chapman, 1958^{i g}
- Hebrus cebuensis Zettel, 2006^{i g}
- Hebrus chappuisi Poisson, 1944^{i g}
- Hebrus comatus Drake and Harris, 1943^{i c g}
- Hebrus concinnus Uhler, 1894^{i c g}
- Hebrus consolidus Uhler, 1894^{i c g b}
- Hebrus cruciatus (Distant, 1910)^{i g}
- Hebrus dartevellei Poisson, 1957^{i g}
- Hebrus drakei Porter, 1959^{i g}
- Hebrus dubius Poisson, 1944^{i g}
- Hebrus eckerleini (Jordan, 1954)^{i g}
- Hebrus ecuadoris Drake and Harris, 1943^{i g}
- Hebrus elegans Lundblad, 1933^{i g}
- Hebrus elimatus Drake and Cobben, 1960^{i g}
- Hebrus engaeus Drake and Chapman, 1958^{i g}
- Hebrus fischeri Zettel, 2004^{i g}
- Hebrus franzi (Wagner, 1957)^{i g}
- Hebrus fulvinervis Horváth, 1929^{i g}
- Hebrus gembuanus Linnavuori, 1981^{i g}
- Hebrus gerardi Poisson, 1950^{i g}
- Hebrus gidshaensis Cobben, 1982^{i g}
- Hebrus gloriosus Drake and Harris, 1943^{i g}
- Hebrus haddeni Porter, 1954^{i g}
- Hebrus hamdoumi Poisson, 1951^{i g}
- Hebrus harrisi Porter, 1959^{i g}
- Hebrus hasegawai Miyamoto, 1964^{i g}
- Hebrus hirsutulus Zettel, 2004^{i g}
- Hebrus hirsutus Champion, 1898^{i g}
- Hebrus hissarensis Kanyukova, 1997^{i g}
- Hebrus hoberlandti Porter, 1959^{i g}
- Hebrus houti Poisson, 1956^{i g}
- Hebrus hubbardi Porter, 1952^{i c g}
- Hebrus humeralis Horváth, 1929^{i g}
- Hebrus hungerfordi Drake and Harris, 1943^{i g}
- Hebrus ifellus Linnavuori, 1973^{i g}
- Hebrus iheriri Poisson, 1953^{i g}
- Hebrus ilaira Cobben and Linnavuori, 1983^{i g}
- Hebrus ilocanus Zettel, 2014^{i g}
- Hebrus isaloi Poisson, 1951^{i g}
- Hebrus jeanneli Poisson, 1944^{i g}
- Hebrus judithae Zettel, 2006^{i g}
- Hebrus kanseniae Poisson, 1950^{i g}
- Hebrus kasompii Poisson, 1964^{i g}
- Hebrus katompei Poisson, 1950^{i g}
- Hebrus kheiron Linnavuori, 1981^{i g}
- Hebrus kiritshenkoi Kanyukova, 1997^{i g}
- Hebrus kundelungui Poisson, 1957^{i g}
- Hebrus lacunatus Drake and Chapman, 1958^{i g}
- Hebrus lacustris Zettel, 2006^{i g}
- Hebrus laeviventris Champion, 1898^{i g}
- Hebrus latensis (Hale, 1926)^{i g}
- Hebrus leleupi Cobben, 1982^{i g}
- Hebrus liliimacula Horváth, 1929^{i g}
- Hebrus limnaeus Drake and Chapman, 1958^{i g}
- Hebrus linnavuorii J. Polhemus, 1989^{i g}
- Hebrus lokobei Poisson, 1951^{i g}
- Hebrus longicornis Linnavuori, 1981^{i g}
- Hebrus longipilosus Zettel, 2002^{i g}
- Hebrus longisetosus Zettel, 2004^{i g}
- Hebrus longivillus J. Polhemus and McKinnon, 1983^{i c g}
- Hebrus lucidus Poisson, 1952^{i g}
- Hebrus machadoi Hoberlandt, 1951^{i g}
- Hebrus major Champion, 1898^{i c g}
- Hebrus manamboloi Poisson, 1952^{i g}
- Hebrus mancinii Poisson, 1955^{i g}
- Hebrus mangrovensis J. Polhemus and D. Polhemus, 1989^{i g}
- Hebrus megacephalus Miyamoto, 1965^{i g}
- Hebrus mizae Hoberlandt, 1951^{i g}
- Hebrus modestus Poisson, 1952^{i g}
- Hebrus montanus Kolenati, 1857^{i g}
- Hebrus monteithii Lansbury, 1990^{i g}
- Hebrus murphyi Zettel, 2004^{i g}
- Hebrus nasus Zettel, 2000^{i g}
- Hebrus nereis J. Polhemus and D. Polhemus, 1989^{i g}
- Hebrus nieseri Zettel, 2004^{i g}
- Hebrus nipponicus Horváth, 1929^{i g}
- Hebrus nkoupi Poisson, 1951^{i g}
- Hebrus nourlangiei Lansbury, 1990^{i g}
- Hebrus nubilis Drake and Harris, 1943^{i g}
- Hebrus obscurus J. Polhemus and Chapman, 1966^{i c g}
- Hebrus orientalis Distant, 1904^{i g}
- Hebrus oxianus Kanyukova, 1997^{i g}
- Hebrus palawanensis Zettel, 2004^{i g}
- Hebrus pamanzii Poisson, 1959^{i g}
- Hebrus pangantihoni Zettel, 2006^{i g}
- Hebrus papuanus Horváth, 1929^{i g}
- Hebrus parameralis Zettel, 2004^{i g}
- Hebrus parvulus Stål, 1858^{i g}
- Hebrus paulus Drake and Harris, 1943^{i g}
- Hebrus peculiaris Horváth, 1929^{i g}
- Hebrus perplexus Poisson, 1944^{i g}
- Hebrus philippinus Zettel, 2006^{i g}
- Hebrus pictipennis Zettel, 2004^{i g}
- Hebrus pilipes Kanyukova, 1997^{i g}
- Hebrus pilosellus Kanyukova, 1997^{i g}
- Hebrus pilosidorsus J. Polhemus and Chapman, 1970^{i g}
- Hebrus pilosus Andersen and Weir, 2004^{i g}
- Hebrus plaumanni Porter, 1952^{i g}
- Hebrus polysetosus Zettel, 2004^{i g}
- Hebrus priscus Drake and Harris, 1943^{i g}
- Hebrus pseudocruciatus Zettel, 2004^{i g}
- Hebrus pseudopusillus Cobben, 1982^{i g}
- Hebrus pudoris Drake and Harris, 1943^{i g}
- Hebrus pusillus (Fallén, 1807)^{i c g}
- Hebrus rhodesiana Poisson, 1964^{i g}
- Hebrus rogbanei Poisson, 1960^{i g}
- Hebrus rufescens Bergroth, 1918^{i g}
- Hebrus ruficeps Thomson, 1871^{i g}
- Hebrus saxatilis Linnavuori, 1971^{i g}
- Hebrus schillhammeri Zettel, 2011^{i g}
- Hebrus scutelloacutus Poisson, 1952^{i g}
- Hebrus seychellensis D. Polhemus, 1992^{i g}
- Hebrus seyferti Zettel, 2006^{i g}
- Hebrus sobrinus Uhler, 1877^{i c g}
- Hebrus spiculus J. Polhemus and McKinnon, 1983^{i g}
- Hebrus spinitibialis Cobben, 1982^{i g}
- Hebrus sulcatus Champion, 1898^{i g}
- Hebrus syriacus Horváth, 1896^{i g}
- Hebrus thymoma Cobben and Linnavuori, 1983^{i g}
- Hebrus timasiformis Zettel, 2004^{i g}
- Hebrus tsimbazazae Poisson, 1951^{i g}
- Hebrus tuberculifer Zettel, 2006^{i g}
- Hebrus tuckahoanus Drake and Chapman, 1954^{i c g}
- Hebrus ullrichi Zettel, 2004^{i g}
- Hebrus ulului Poisson, 1960^{i g}
- Hebrus usingeri Drake and Harris, 1943^{i g}
- Hebrus vaillanti Poisson, 1953^{i g}
- Hebrus vietnamensis Zettel and Tran, 2016^{i g}
- Hebrus violaceus Poisson, 1944^{i g}
- Hebrus wygodzinskyi Hoberlandt, 1951^{i g}

Data sources: i = ITIS, c = Catalogue of Life, g = GBIF, b = Bugguide.net
