= Rhagovelia magdalena =

Scientific classification
- Kingdom: Animalia
- Phylum: Arthropoda
- Clade: Pancrustacea
- Class: Insecta
- Order: Hemiptera
- Suborder: Heteroptera
- Family: Veliidae
- Genus: Rhagovelia
- Species: R. magdalena

Binomial name
- Rhagovelia magdalena Padilla-Gil, 2011

Species of true bug

Rhagovelia magdalena is a species of aquatic bug first found in Vereda La Vega, Río Magdalena, Oporapa, Huila, Colombia.
