= Rhagovelia vega =

Scientific classification
- Domain: Eukaryota
- Kingdom: Animalia
- Phylum: Arthropoda
- Class: Insecta
- Order: Hemiptera
- Suborder: Heteroptera
- Family: Veliidae
- Genus: Rhagovelia
- Species: R. vega

Binomial name
- Rhagovelia vega Padilla-Gil, 2011

Species of true bug

Rhagovelia vega is a species of aquatic bug first found in Vereda La Vega, Oporapa, Huila, Colombia.
