= Perittopus falciformis =

Scientific classification
- Kingdom: Animalia
- Phylum: Arthropoda
- Class: Insecta
- Order: Hemiptera
- Suborder: Heteroptera
- Family: Veliidae
- Genus: Perittopus
- Species: P. falciformis

Binomial name
- Perittopus falciformis Ye, Chen & Bu, 2013

Species of true bug

Perittopus falciformis is a species of riffle bug from China, first described in 2013 by Zhen Ye, Pingping Chen and Wenjun Bu, based on apterous specimens collected in Yunnan Province at an altitude of 1500 m. Winged specimens of either sex are thus far unknown.

== Taxonomy ==
Based on male genital characteristics, Perittopus falciformis can be placed to the "western species group" in Perittopus, and appears closely related to Perittopus zhengi and Perittopus laosensis.
