= Perittopus yunnanensis =

Scientific classification
- Kingdom: Animalia
- Phylum: Arthropoda
- Class: Insecta
- Order: Hemiptera
- Suborder: Heteroptera
- Family: Veliidae
- Genus: Perittopus
- Species: P. yunnanensis

Binomial name
- Perittopus yunnanensis Ye, Chen & Bu, 2013

Species of true bug

Perittopus yunnanensis is a species of riffle bug first described in 2013 by Zhen Ye, Pingping Chen and Wenjun Bu. It is recorded from Yunnan Province, China, for which it is named.

== Taxonomy ==
Based on male genital characteristics, Perittopus yunnanensis can be placed to the "eastern species group" of genus Perittopus. The species appears closely related to Perittopus anthracinus and Perittopus crinalis.
