= Perittopus breddini =

Scientific classification
- Kingdom: Animalia
- Phylum: Arthropoda
- Class: Insecta
- Order: Hemiptera
- Suborder: Heteroptera
- Family: Veliidae
- Genus: Perittopus
- Species: P. breddini

Binomial name
- Perittopus breddini Kirkaldy, 1901

Species of true bug

Perittopus breddini is an Indonesian species of riffle bug and the designated type species of genus Perittopus.

== Distribution and habitat ==
Perittopus breddini is confined to Bali and Central and East Java, where it is found on mountains at altitudes between 730 and 1550 m above sea level.

In 2001, Perittopus specimens formerly identified as belonging to respectively P. breddini or P. vicarians in Malaysia, Thailand and China were described as a new species: P. asiaticus.

== Description ==
Females larger than males; winged ("macropterous") specimens larger than wingless ("apterous") specimens of the same sex. Size ranges from 3.2 mm to 4.0 mm. Wingless specimens resemble those of Perittopus crinalis, but can be separated in females by the shape of the black mark on the pronotum (heart-shaped on P. breddini and indistinct on P. crinalis) and in males by the genital characteristics.
