= Rhagovelia rosensis =

Scientific classification
- Kingdom: Animalia
- Phylum: Arthropoda
- Clade: Pancrustacea
- Class: Insecta
- Order: Hemiptera
- Suborder: Heteroptera
- Family: Veliidae
- Genus: Rhagovelia
- Species: R. rosensis

Binomial name
- Rhagovelia rosensis Padilla-Gil, 2011

Species of true bug

Rhagovelia rosensis is a species of aquatic bug first found in Vereda Santa Rosa, Consejo Comunitario Río Mejicano, Tumaco, Nariño, Colombia.
