= Rhagovelia espriella =

Scientific classification
- Domain: Eukaryota
- Kingdom: Animalia
- Phylum: Arthropoda
- Class: Insecta
- Order: Hemiptera
- Suborder: Heteroptera
- Family: Veliidae
- Genus: Rhagovelia
- Species: R. espriella

Binomial name
- Rhagovelia espriella Padilla-Gil, 2011

Species of true bug

Rhagovelia espriella is a species of aquatic bug first found in La Espriella, Tumaco, Nariño, Colombia.
