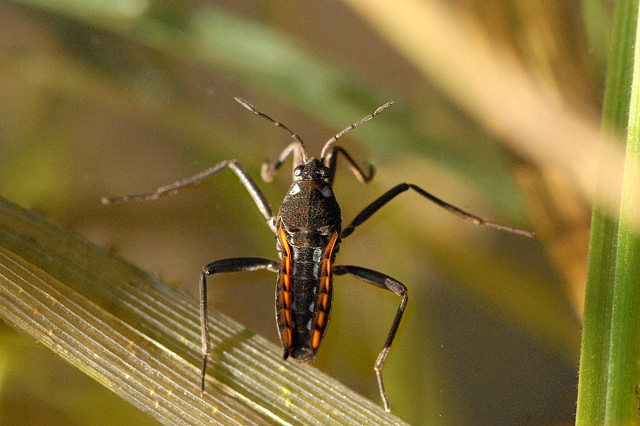

Scientific classification
- Kingdom: Animalia
- Phylum: Arthropoda
- Class: Insecta
- Order: Hemiptera
- Suborder: Heteroptera
- Family: Veliidae
- Genus: Velia
- Species: V. caprai

Binomial name
- Velia caprai (Tamanini, 1947)

= Velia caprai =

Species of true bug

Velia caprai, known as the water cricket, is a species of aquatic bug found in Europe. It grows to a length of 8.5 mm (0.33 in) and is stouter than pond skaters of the family Gerridae. It is distasteful to predatory fish, engages in kleptoparasitism, and can travel at twice its normal speed by spitting on the water surface.

== Description ==
The adult insect grows to a length of 6.2–8.5 millimetres (0.24–0.33 in). Members of the family Veliidae resemble the pond skaters of the family Gerridae, but with stouter middle and hind legs, and a generally stouter appearance.

== Ecology ==
Velia caprai has a chemical defence mechanism which is often able to prevent predation. It is so distasteful to brown trout (Salmo trutta) that the fish will spit out any Velia caprai it takes without causing them any damage.

== Behaviour ==
Velia caprai is subject to kleptoparasitism. In one study, whenever it took prey heavier than 7.9 milligrams (0.122 gr), other bugs of the same species joined it and successfully ate parts of the prey.

One unusual behaviour exhibited by Velia caprai is called "expansion skating", or Entspannungschwimmen (German for "relaxation swimming"), in which saliva is ejected from the insect's beak onto the surface of the water, lowering the surface tension and allowing the insect to travel at up to twice its normal speed.

Velia caprai aligns itself to the plane of polarised light, although the reasons for this behaviour are not clear.

== Taxonomic history ==
Velia caprai was first described as a separate species by Livio Tamanini in 1947, in a monographic revision of the genus Velia. Formerly, V. caprai and other species, such as V. saulii, were included in Velia currens (Fabricius, 1794).
