= Hebrus burmeisteri =

Scientific classification
- Domain: Eukaryota
- Kingdom: Animalia
- Phylum: Arthropoda
- Class: Insecta
- Order: Hemiptera
- Suborder: Heteroptera
- Family: Hebridae
- Genus: Hebrus
- Species: H. burmeisteri

Binomial name
- Hebrus burmeisteri Lethierry & Severin, 1896

Species of true bug

Hebrus burmeisteri is a species of velvet water bug in the family Hebridae. It is found in Central America and North America.
