= Rhagovelia rivale =

Scientific classification
- Domain: Eukaryota
- Kingdom: Animalia
- Phylum: Arthropoda
- Class: Insecta
- Order: Hemiptera
- Suborder: Heteroptera
- Family: Veliidae
- Genus: Rhagovelia
- Species: R. rivale

Binomial name
- Rhagovelia rivale Torre-bueno, 1924

Species of true bug

Rhagovelia rivale is a species of smaller water strider in the family Veliidae. It is found in North America.
