= Rhagovelia choreutes =

Scientific classification
- Domain: Eukaryota
- Kingdom: Animalia
- Phylum: Arthropoda
- Class: Insecta
- Order: Hemiptera
- Suborder: Heteroptera
- Family: Veliidae
- Genus: Rhagovelia
- Species: R. choreutes

Binomial name
- Rhagovelia choreutes Hussey, 1925

Species of true bug

Rhagovelia choreutes is a species in the infraorder Gerromorpha ("semiaquatic bugs"), in the order Hemiptera ("true bugs, cicadas, hoppers, aphids and allies"). The distribution range of Rhagovelia choreutes includes Central America and North America.
