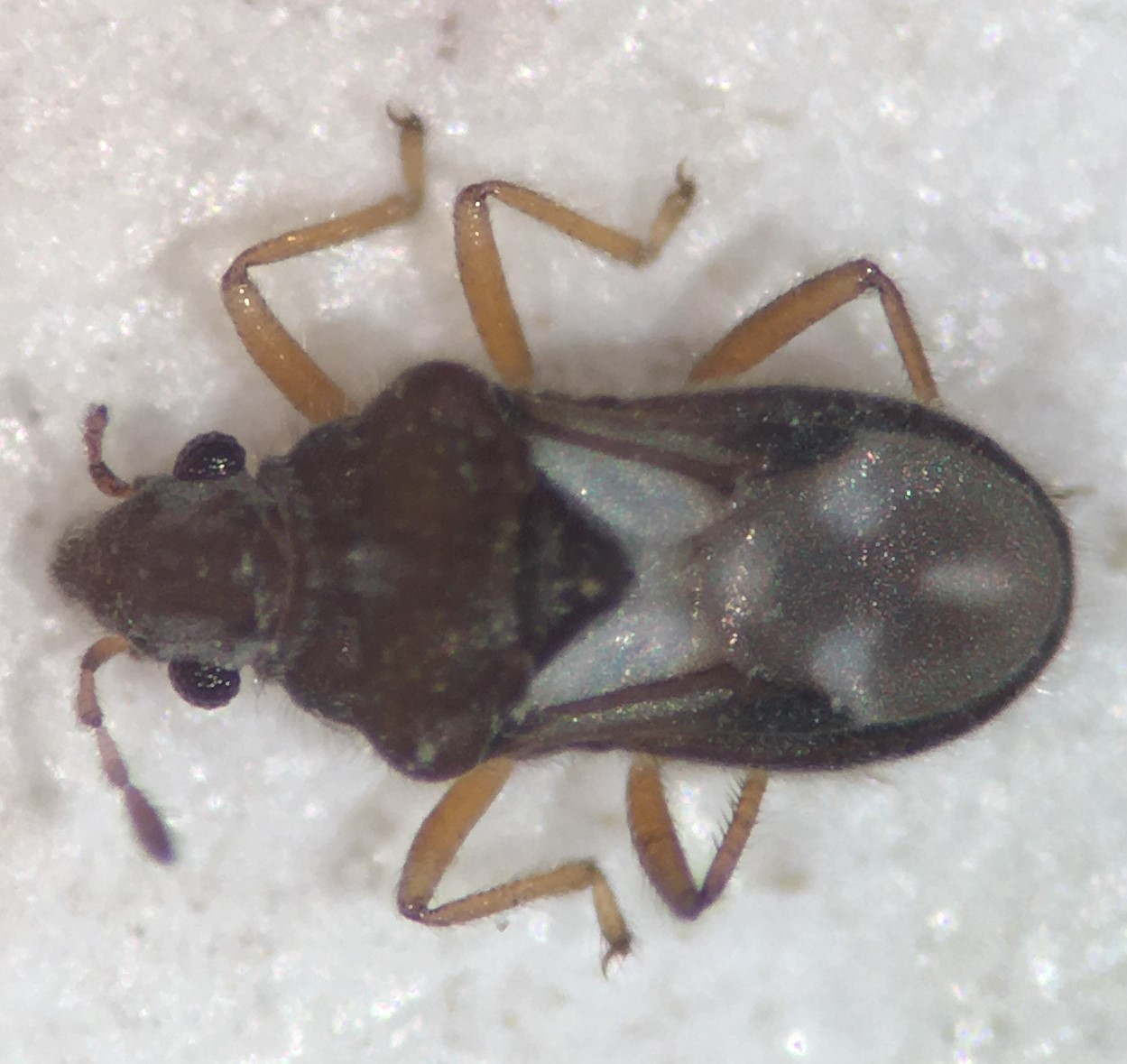

Scientific classification
- Domain: Eukaryota
- Kingdom: Animalia
- Phylum: Arthropoda
- Class: Insecta
- Order: Hemiptera
- Suborder: Heteroptera
- Family: Hebridae
- Genus: Merragata
- Species: M. hebroides

Binomial name
- Merragata hebroides Buchanan-White, 1877

Synonyms
- Merragata foveata Drake, 1917; Merragata lindbergi Poisson, 1954; Merragata slossoni Van Duzee, 1921

= Merragata hebroides =

Species of true bug

Merragata hebroides is a species of velvet water bug in the family Hebridae. It is found in the Caribbean Sea, Central America, North America, Oceania, and South America.
