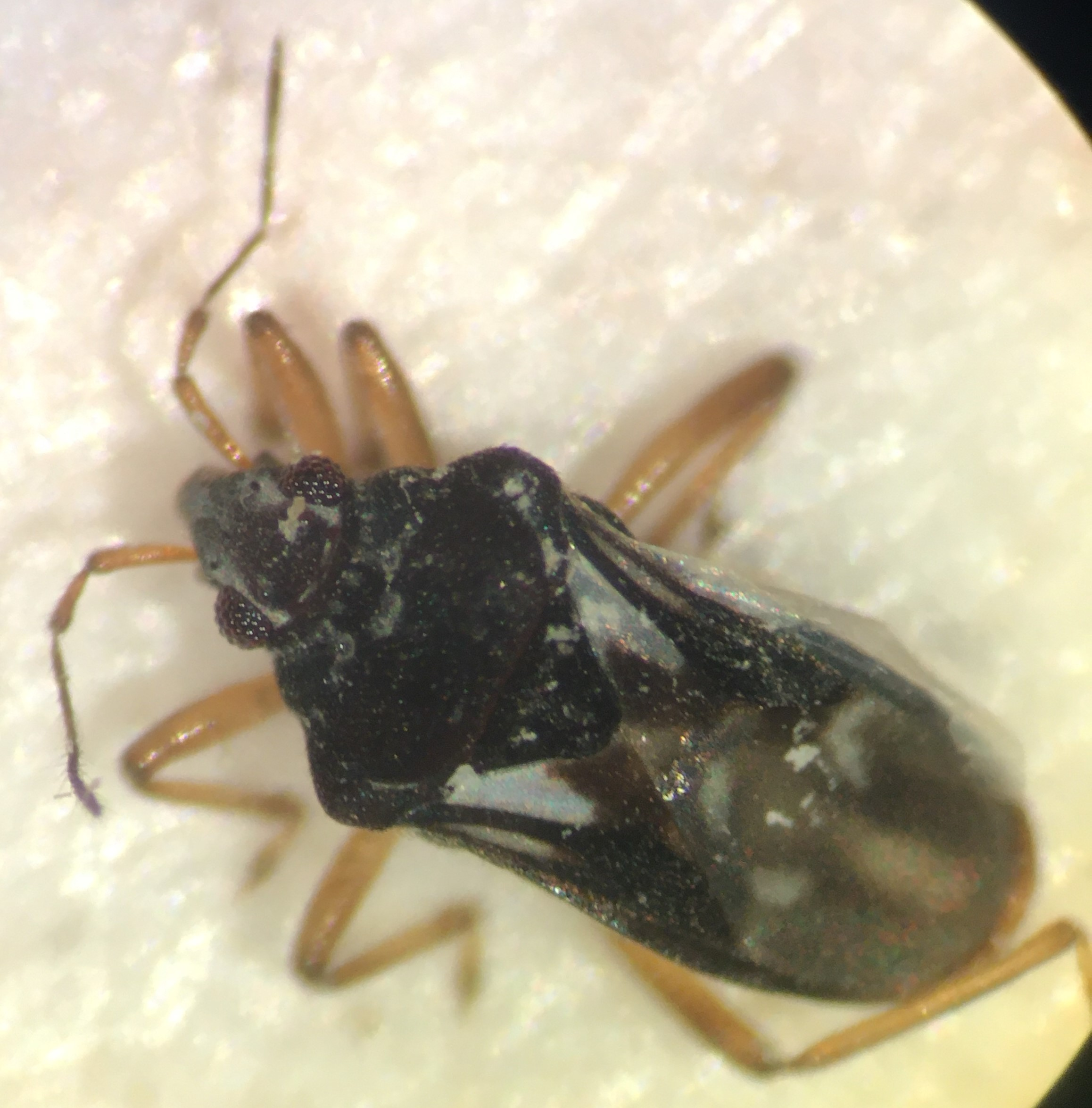

Scientific classification
- Domain: Eukaryota
- Kingdom: Animalia
- Phylum: Arthropoda
- Class: Insecta
- Order: Hemiptera
- Suborder: Heteroptera
- Family: Hebridae
- Genus: Hebrus
- Species: H. consolidus

Binomial name
- Hebrus consolidus Uhler, 1894

= Hebrus consolidus =

Species of true bug

Hebrus consolidus is a species of velvet water bug in the family Hebridae. It is found in the Caribbean Sea, Central America, and North America.
