= Merragata brunnea =

Scientific classification
- Kingdom: Animalia
- Phylum: Arthropoda
- Clade: Pancrustacea
- Class: Insecta
- Order: Hemiptera
- Suborder: Heteroptera
- Family: Hebridae
- Genus: Merragata
- Species: M. brunnea

Binomial name
- Merragata brunnea Drake, 1917

Species of true bug

Merragata brunnea is a species of velvet water bug in the family Hebridae. It is found in North America.
