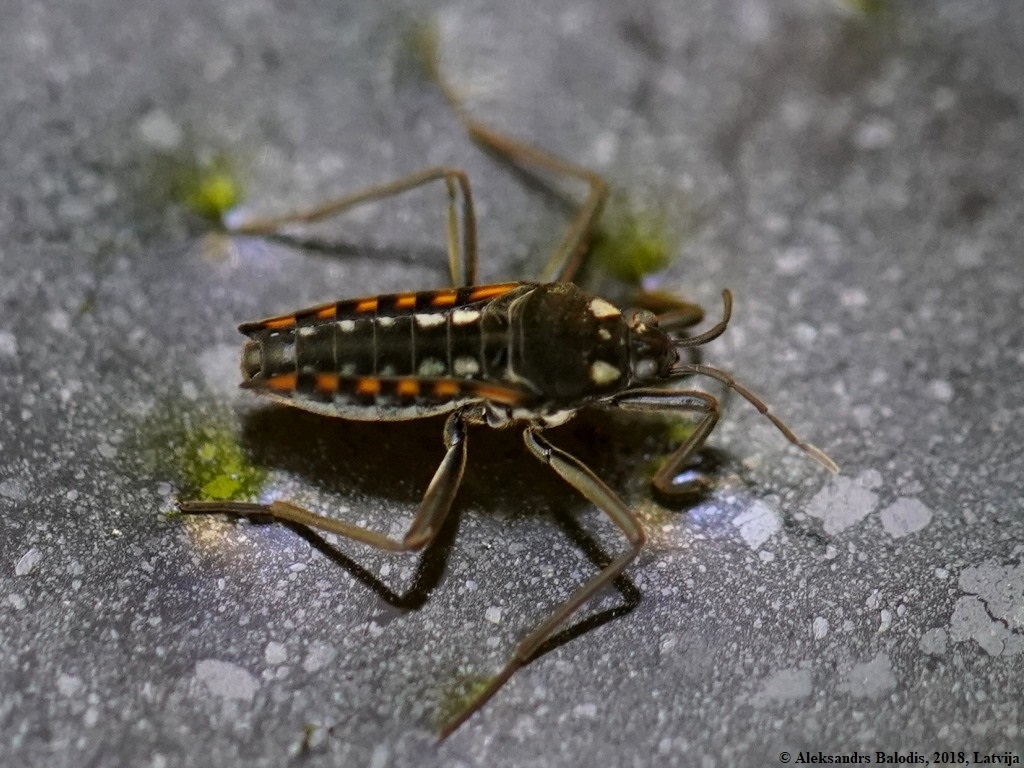

Scientific classification
- Kingdom: Animalia
- Phylum: Arthropoda
- Clade: Pancrustacea
- Class: Insecta
- Order: Hemiptera
- Suborder: Heteroptera
- Family: Veliidae
- Genus: Velia
- Species: V. saulii

Binomial name
- Velia saulii Tamanini, 1947

= Velia saulii =

Species of true bug

Velia saulii is a Palearctic species of true bug. It is aquatic.
