= Lipogomphus brevis =

Scientific classification
- Domain: Eukaryota
- Kingdom: Animalia
- Phylum: Arthropoda
- Class: Insecta
- Order: Hemiptera
- Suborder: Heteroptera
- Family: Hebridae
- Genus: Lipogomphus
- Species: L. brevis

Binomial name
- Lipogomphus brevis (Champion, 1898)

Synonyms
- Merragata brevis Champion, 1898

Species of true bug

Lipogomphus brevis is a species of velvet water bug in the family Hebridae. It is found in Central America and North America.
