= Platyvelia brachialis =

Scientific classification
- Kingdom: Animalia
- Phylum: Arthropoda
- Clade: Pancrustacea
- Class: Insecta
- Order: Hemiptera
- Suborder: Heteroptera
- Family: Veliidae
- Genus: Platyvelia
- Species: P. brachialis

Binomial name
- Platyvelia brachialis (Stål, 1860)

Species of true bug

Platyvelia brachialis is a species of smaller water strider in the family Veliidae. It is found in the Caribbean, Central America, North America, and South America.
