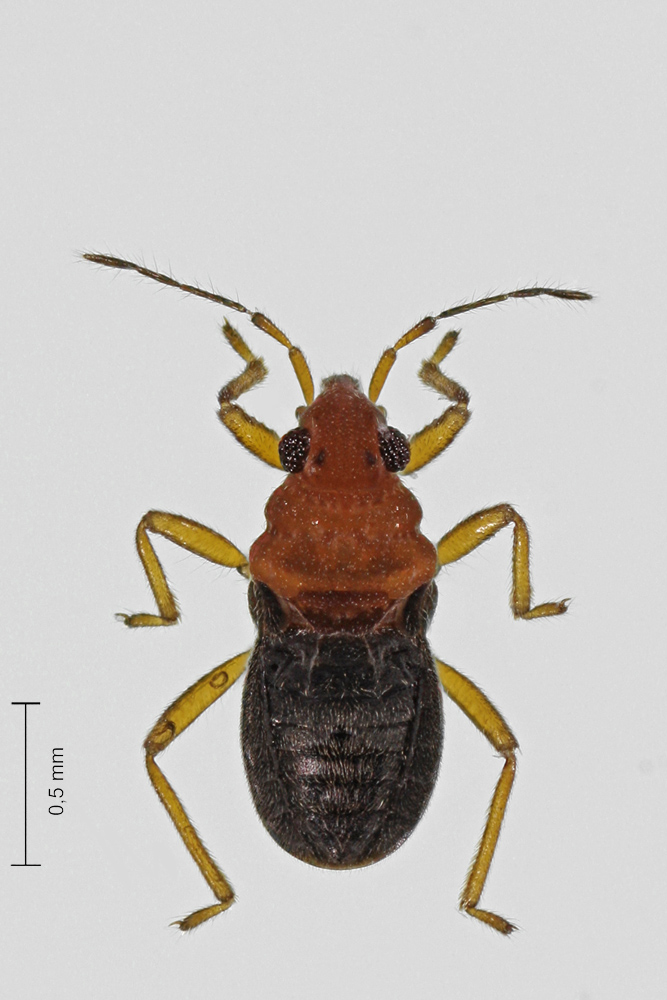
- Hebrus ruficeps Finland

Scientific classification
- Kingdom: Animalia
- Phylum: Arthropoda
- Clade: Pancrustacea
- Class: Insecta
- Order: Hemiptera
- Suborder: Heteroptera
- Family: Hebridae
- Genus: Hebrus
- Species: H. ruficeps

Binomial name
- Hebrus ruficeps Thomson, 1871

= Hebrus ruficeps =

Species of true bug

Hebrus ruficeps is a Palearctic species of true bug. It is aquatic.
