= Hebrus buenoi =

Scientific classification
- Domain: Eukaryota
- Kingdom: Animalia
- Phylum: Arthropoda
- Class: Insecta
- Order: Hemiptera
- Suborder: Heteroptera
- Family: Hebridae
- Genus: Hebrus
- Species: H. buenoi

Binomial name
- Hebrus buenoi Drake & Harris, 1943

Species of true bug

Hebrus buenoi, or Bueno's velvet water bug, is a species of velvet water bug in the family Hebridae. It is found in Central America and North America.

== Subspecies ==
These two subspecies belong to the species Hebrus buenoi:

- Hebrus buenoi buenoi Drake & Harris, 1943
- Hebrus buenoi furvus J. Polhemus & Chapman, 1970
