= Perittopus zhengi =

Scientific classification
- Domain: Eukaryota
- Kingdom: Animalia
- Phylum: Arthropoda
- Class: Insecta
- Order: Hemiptera
- Suborder: Heteroptera
- Family: Veliidae
- Genus: Perittopus
- Species: P. zhengi

Binomial name
- Perittopus zhengi Ye, Chen & Bu, 2013

Species of true bug

Perittopus zhengi is a species of riffle bug from Thailand (Chiang Mai Province). It was described in 2013 by Zhen Ye, Pingping Chen and Wenjun Bu, and is named after Professor Leyi Zheng. Its authors placed it to the "eastern species group" within genus Perittopus.

== Description ==
Specimens of both sexes are orange and brown and have dark brown, segmented antennae. Among wingless (apterous) specimens, females are longer than their male counterparts at respectively 3-3.1&mm and 2.7 mm body length. For winged (macropterous) specimens, this is the other way around: winged males are, at 3.4-3.5 mm, slightly larger than winged females, which measure 3.2-3.3 mm.

Specimens resemble those of Perittopus asiaticus, to which it is closely related and with which it may co-occur. Winged female specimens of both species are particularly difficult to reliably tell apart.
