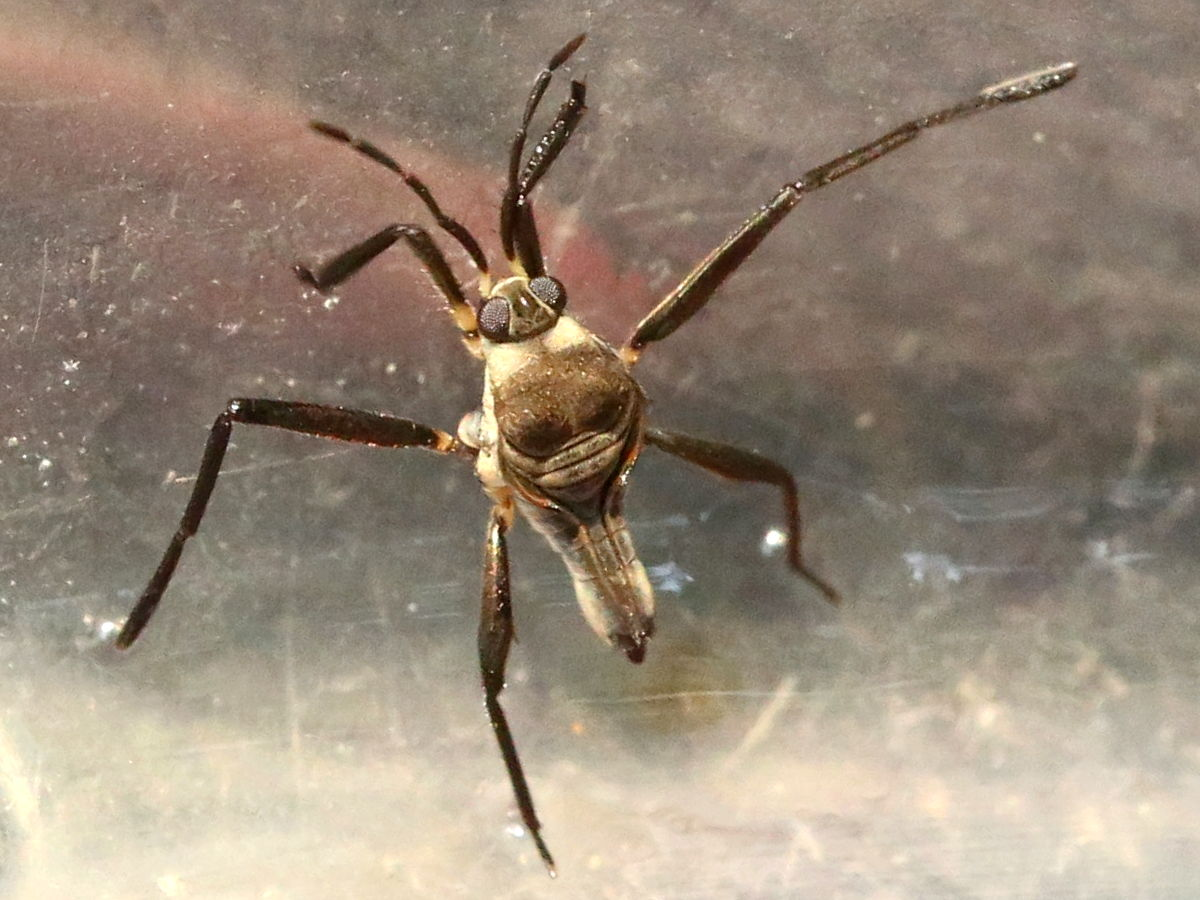

Scientific classification
- Domain: Eukaryota
- Kingdom: Animalia
- Phylum: Arthropoda
- Class: Insecta
- Order: Hemiptera
- Suborder: Heteroptera
- Family: Veliidae
- Genus: Rhagovelia
- Species: R. obesa

Binomial name
- Rhagovelia obesa Uhler, 1871

Synonyms
- Rhagovelia arctoa Torre-Bueno, 1924; Rhagovelia flavicincta Torre-Bueno, 1924; Rhagovelia obesa flavicincta Torre-Bueno, 1924

= Rhagovelia obesa =

Species of true bug

Rhagovelia obesa is a species of smaller water striders in the family Veliidae. It is found in North America.
