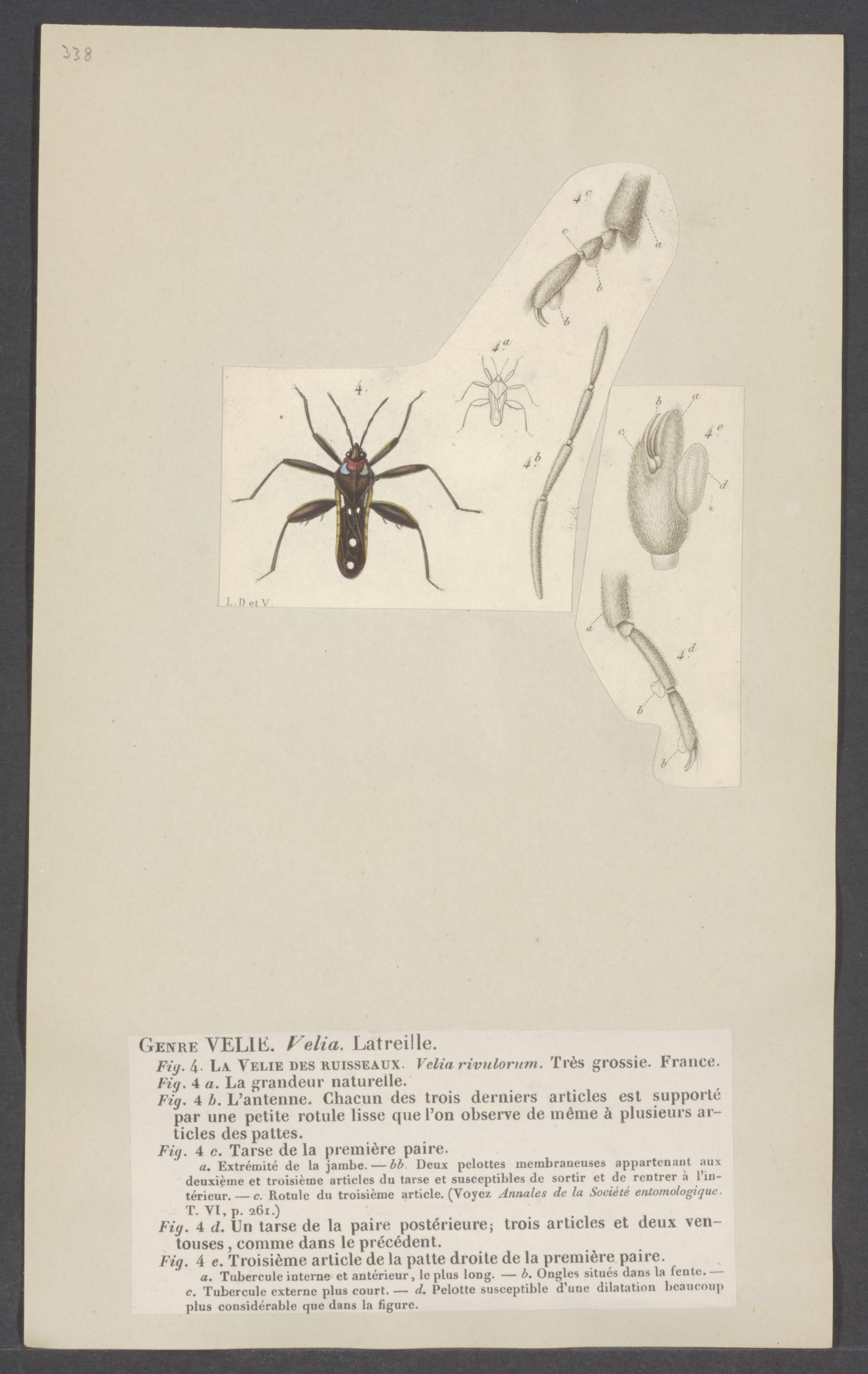

Scientific classification
- Kingdom: Animalia
- Phylum: Arthropoda
- Class: Insecta
- Order: Hemiptera
- Suborder: Heteroptera
- Family: Veliidae
- Genus: Velia; Latreille, 1804

= Velia (bug) =

Genus of true bugs

Velia is a genus of aquatic bugs in the family Veliidae.

== Species ==
- Velia caprai (Tamanini, 1947)
- Velia currens (Fabricius, 1794)
- Velia helenae
- Velia saulii
