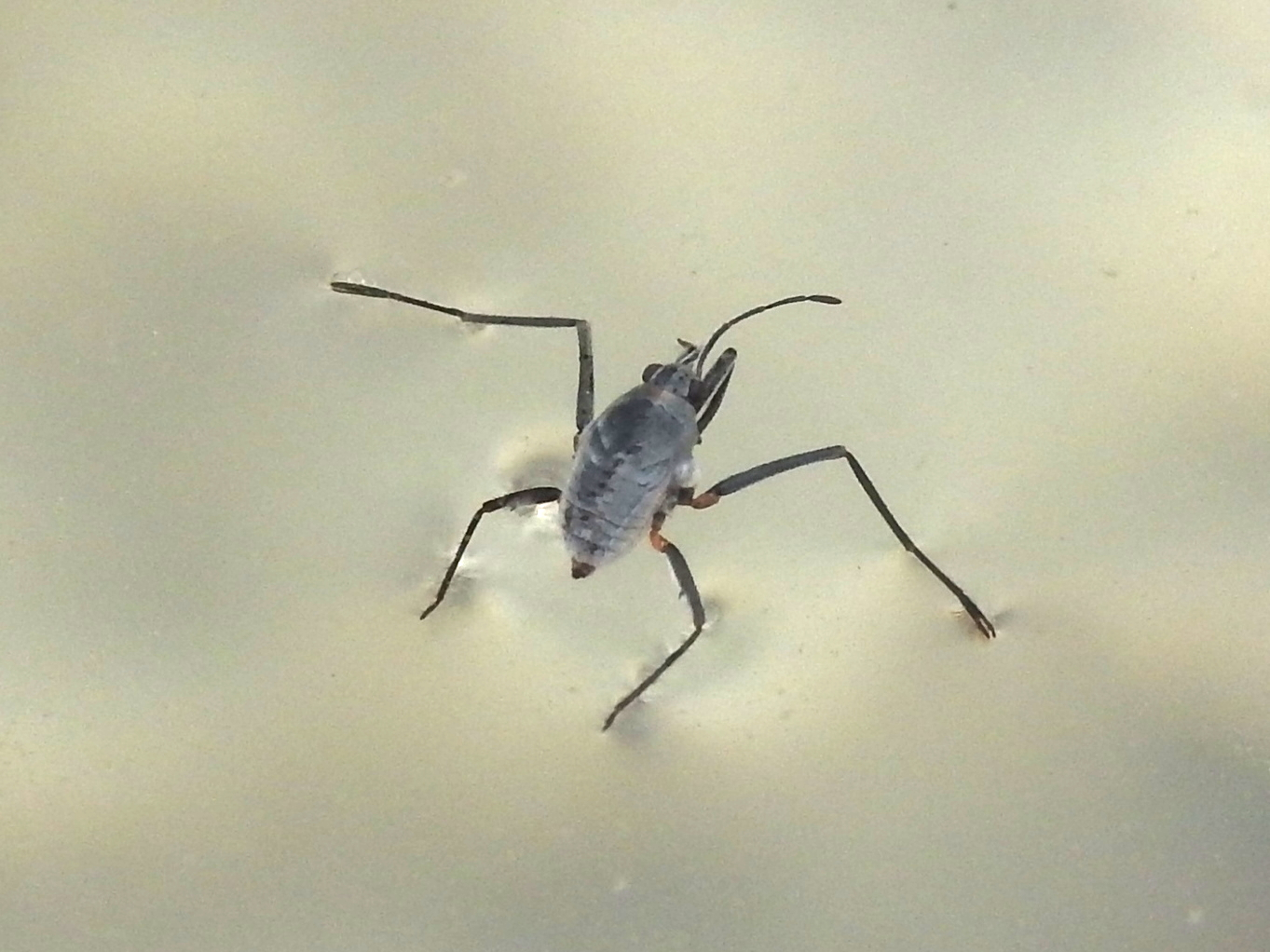

Scientific classification
- Domain: Eukaryota
- Kingdom: Animalia
- Phylum: Arthropoda
- Class: Insecta
- Order: Hemiptera
- Suborder: Heteroptera
- Family: Veliidae
- Genus: Rhagovelia
- Species: R. plumbea

Binomial name
- Rhagovelia plumbea Uhler, 1894

Synonyms
- Trochopus marinus Carpenter, 1898

= Rhagovelia plumbea =

Species of true bug

Rhagovelia plumbea is a species of smaller water strider in the family Veliidae. It is found in the Caribbean, Central America, North America, and South America.
