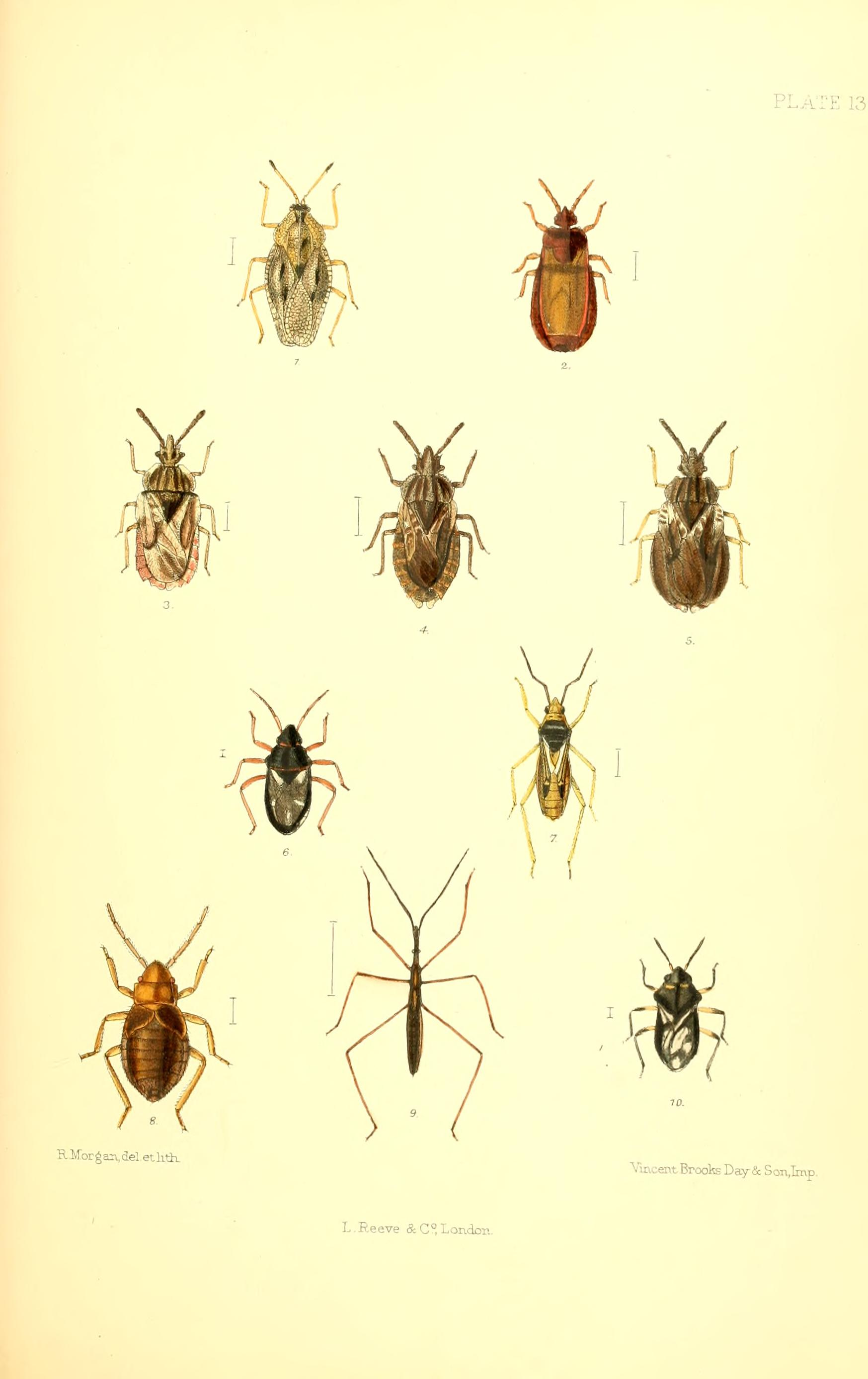
- Hebrus pusillus depicted in Edward Saunders Hemiptera Heteroptera of the British Islands (figure 6)

Scientific classification
- Domain: Eukaryota
- Kingdom: Animalia
- Phylum: Arthropoda
- Class: Insecta
- Order: Hemiptera
- Suborder: Heteroptera
- Family: Hebridae
- Genus: Hebrus
- Species: H. pusillus

Binomial name
- Hebrus pusillus (Fallén, 1807)

= Hebrus pusillus =

Species of true bug

Hebrus pusillus is a true bug. The species is found in the Palearctic. It ranges from Europe and North Africa to Asia Minor, then east to Kirgizia. Hebrus pusillus is a tiny (2 mm long) semi-aquatic bug which lives in wet places, such as small lakes, heath and fen ponds, often at the shore amongst dense vegetation or in Lemna or Sphagnum. In Denmark, England, Germany and Sweden it is univoltine.
