= Perittopus =

Scientific classification
- Domain: Eukaryota
- Kingdom: Animalia
- Phylum: Arthropoda
- Class: Insecta
- Order: Hemiptera
- Suborder: Heteroptera
- Family: Veliidae
- Genus: Perittopus; Fieber, 1861

Genus of true bugs

Perittopus is a genus of riffle bug, and the sole genus of subfamily Perittopinae. Its species occur from southern India east to Indonesia and north to China in mountain stream habitats. Visually, the red or orange to reddish colour of Perittopus spp. separates them from other members of the Veliidae.

== Species ==
As of January 2024, the Global Biodiversity Information Facility lists the following species for genus Perittopus:

- Perittopus anthracinus Ye, Qiao, Jin & Bu, 2020
- Perittopus asiaticus Zettel, 2001
- Perittopus borneensis Zettel, 2001
- Perittopus breddini Kirkaldy, 1901 - type species
- Perittopus campbelli Lundblad, 1933
- Perittopus ceylanicus Zettel, 2001
- Perittopus crinalis Ye, Chen & Bu, 2013
- Perittopus falciformis Ye, Chen & Bu, 2013
- Perittopus horvathi Lundblad, 1933
- Perittopus laosensis Ye, Qiao, Jin & Bu, 2020
- Perittopus maculatus Paiva, 1919
- Perittopus rufus Distant, 1903
- Perittopus schuhi Zettel, 2001
- Perittopus sumatrensis Zettel, 2001
- Perittopus trizonus Ye, Qiao, Jin & Bu, 2020
- Perittopus vicarians Breddin, 1905
- Perittopus webbi Zettel, 2001
- Perittopus yunnanensis Ye, Chen & Bu, 2013
- Perittopus zhengi Ye, Chen & Bu, 2013
- Perittopus zimmermannae Zettel, 2011
