= Blood gill =

Gill like structure found in larvae of aquatic insects

A blood gill is a gill-like structure restricted to organs with spacious lumen and poorly developed/absent trachea, found in larvae of aquatic insects. Specific research questions the functionality of this gill to respiration, and concludes it exists more likely to absorb water.
