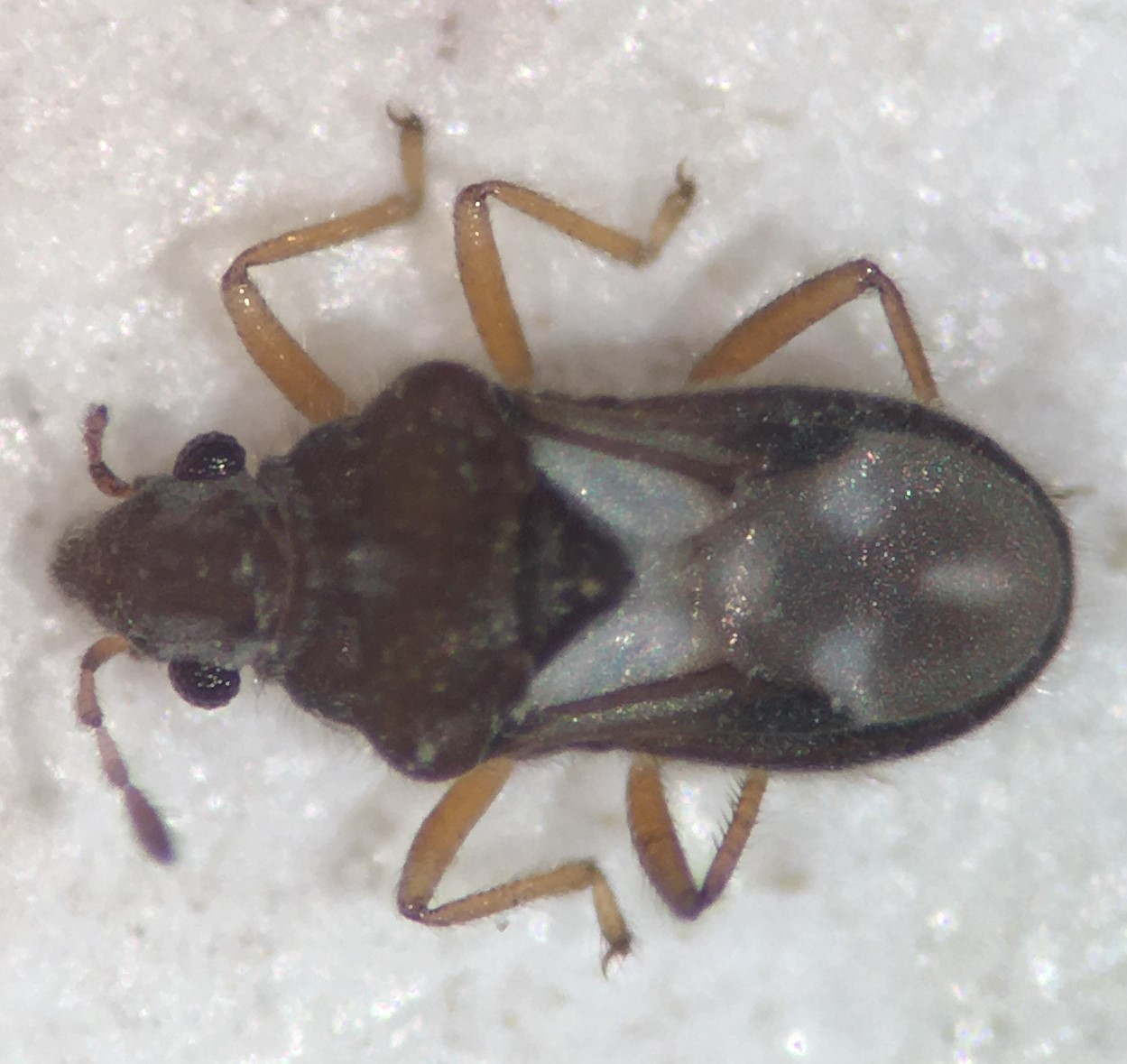

Scientific classification
- Domain: Eukaryota
- Kingdom: Animalia
- Phylum: Arthropoda
- Class: Insecta
- Order: Hemiptera
- Suborder: Heteroptera
- Family: Hebridae
- Subfamily: Hebrinae
- Genus: Merragata; Buchanan-White, 1877

= Merragata =

Genus of true bugs

Merragata is a genus of velvet water bugs in the family Hebridae. There are about seven described species in Merragata.

== Species ==
These seven species belong to the genus Merragata:

- Merragata brunnea Drake, 1917
- Merragata hackeri Hungerford, 1934
- Merragata hebroides Buchanan-White, 1877
- Merragata pallescens Distant, 1909
- Merragata quieta Drake, 1952
- Merragata sessoris Drake & Harris, 1943
- Merragata truxali Porter, 1955
