= Nesidovelia =

Scientific classification
- Kingdom: Animalia
- Phylum: Arthropoda
- Clade: Pancrustacea
- Class: Insecta
- Order: Hemiptera
- Suborder: Heteroptera
- Family: Veliidae
- Genus: Nesidovelia; Andersen & Weir, 2001

Synonyms
- Austromicrovelia Andersen & Weir, 2003; Austromicrovelia Andersen & Weir, 2003; Barbivelia Andersen & Weir, 2003

Genus of true bugs

Nesidovelia is a genus of water striders in the family Veliidae. The genus was first described in 2001 by Andersen and Weir. It is endemic to Australia and species of the genus are found in all Australian states.

The type species is Nesidovelia howense (Hale, 1926).

== Species ==
Species listed in the Australian faunal directory.

- Nesidovelia alisonae (Andersen & Weir, 2003)
- Nesidovelia angelesi (Andersen & Weir, 2003)
- Nesidovelia annemarieae (Andersen & Weir, 2003)
- Nesidovelia australiensis (Andersen & Weir, 2003)
- Nesidovelia barbifer (Andersen & Weir, 2003)
- Nesidovelia carnarvon (Andersen & Weir, 2003)
- Nesidovelia childi (Andersen, 1969)
- Nesidovelia distincta (Malipatil, 1980)
- Nesidovelia eborensis (Andersen & Weir, 2003)
- Nesidovelia falcifer (Andersen & Weir, 2003)
- Nesidovelia fluvialis (Malipatil, 1980)
  - Nesidovelia fluvialis fluvialis (Malipatil, 1980)
  - Nesidovelia fluvialis weiri (Malipatil, 1980)
- Nesidovelia herberti (Andersen & Weir, 2003)
- Nesidovelia howense (Hale, 1926)
- Nesidovelia hypipamee (Andersen & Weir, 2003)
- Nesidovelia malipatili (Andersen & Weir, 2003)
- Nesidovelia margaretae (Andersen & Weir, 2003)
- Nesidovelia mjobergi (Hale, 1925)
- Nesidovelia monteithi (Andersen & Weir, 2003)
- Nesidovelia mossman (Andersen & Weir, 2003)
- Nesidovelia myorensis (Andersen & Weir, 2003)
- Nesidovelia odontogaster (Andersen & Weir, 2003)
- Nesidovelia pennicilla (Andersen & Weir, 2003)
- Nesidovelia peramoena (Hale, 1925)
- Nesidovelia queenslandiae (Andersen & Weir, 2003)
- Nesidovelia spurgeon (Andersen & Weir, 2003)
- Nesidovelia torresiana (Andersen & Weir, 2003)
- Nesidovelia tuberculata (Andersen & Weir, 2003)
- Nesidovelia woodwardi (Andersen & Weir, 2003)
