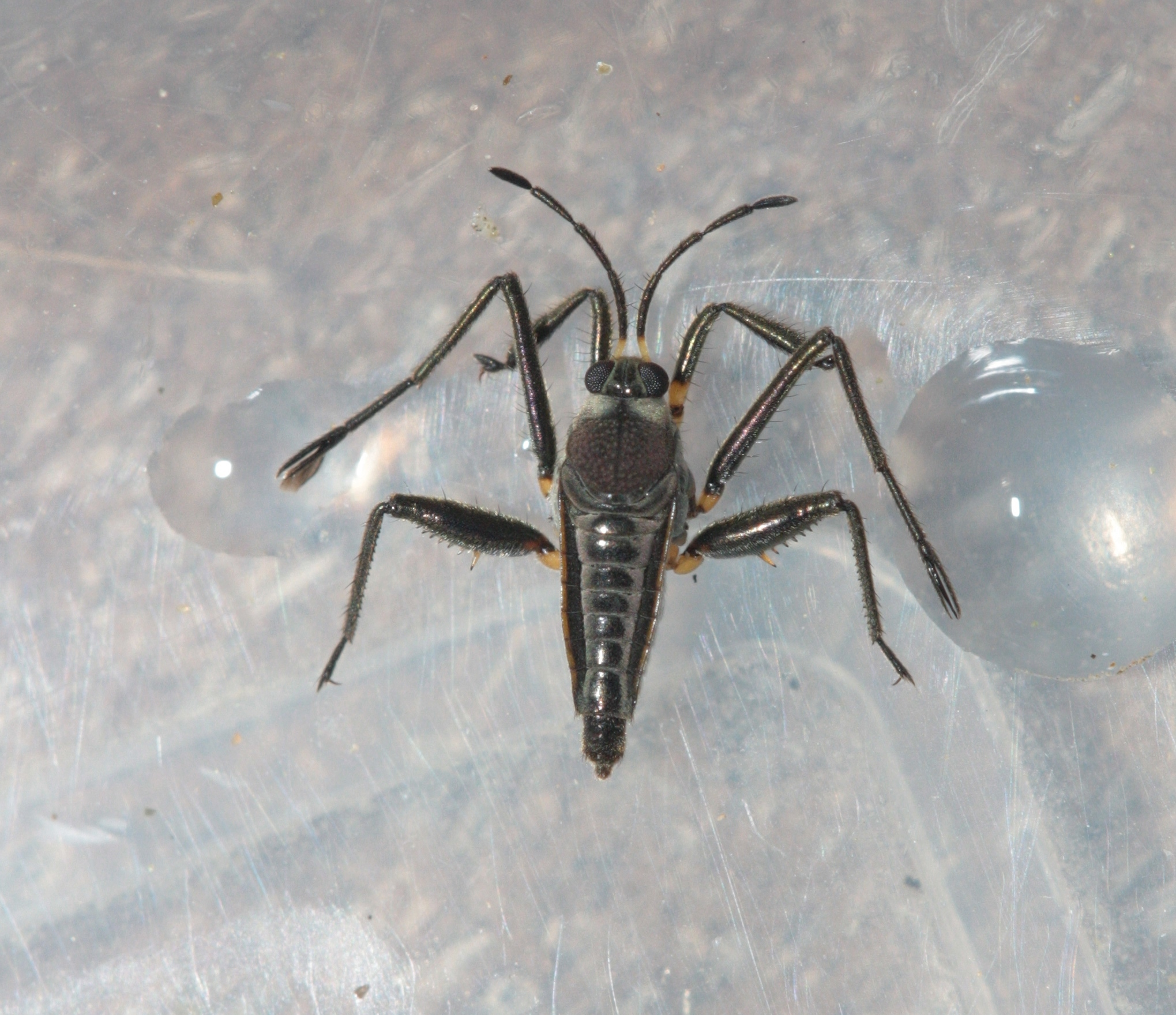

Scientific classification
- Domain: Eukaryota
- Kingdom: Animalia
- Phylum: Arthropoda
- Class: Insecta
- Order: Hemiptera
- Suborder: Heteroptera
- Family: Veliidae
- Genus: Rhagovelia
- Species: R. distincta

Binomial name
- Rhagovelia distincta Champion, 1898

Synonyms
- Rhagovelia excellentis Drake and Harris, 1927

= Rhagovelia distincta =

Species of true bug

Rhagovelia distincta is a species of smaller water strider in the family Veliidae. It is found in Central America and North America.
