= Perittopus crinalis =

Scientific classification
- Kingdom: Animalia
- Phylum: Arthropoda
- Class: Insecta
- Order: Hemiptera
- Suborder: Heteroptera
- Family: Veliidae
- Genus: Perittopus
- Species: P. crinalis

Binomial name
- Perittopus crinalis Ye, Chen & Bu, 2013

Species of true bug

Perittopus crinalis is a species of riffle bug first described in 2013 by Zhen Ye, Pingping Chen and Wenjun Bu. It is recorded from Yunnan Province, China.

== Taxonomy ==
The specific epithet crinalis refers to the dense hairs on the abdominal margins of female specimens. The species was placed to the "eastern species group" of genus Perittopus by its authors, and appears closely related to Perittopus breddini.

== Description ==
Wingless specimens of both sexes are light reddish, with females larger than males at respectively 3.2 mm and 2.9 mm body length. Winged (macropterous) specimens are so far unknown.
