= Lipogomphus =

Scientific classification
- Domain: Eukaryota
- Kingdom: Animalia
- Phylum: Arthropoda
- Class: Insecta
- Order: Hemiptera
- Suborder: Heteroptera
- Family: Hebridae
- Subfamily: Hebrinae
- Genus: Lipogomphus; Berg, 1879

Genus of true bugs

Lipogomphus is a genus of velvet water bugs in the family Hebridae. There are at least four described species in Lipogomphus.

== Species ==
These four species belong to the genus Lipogomphus:

- Lipogomphus accola (Drake & Chapman, 1958)
- Lipogomphus brevis (Champion, 1898)
- Lipogomphus lacuniferus Berg, 1879
- Lipogomphus leucosticta (Champion, 1898)
