= Platyvelia =

Scientific classification
- Domain: Eukaryota
- Kingdom: Animalia
- Phylum: Arthropoda
- Class: Insecta
- Order: Hemiptera
- Suborder: Heteroptera
- Family: Veliidae
- Genus: Platyvelia; J. Polhemus & D. Polhemus, 1993

Genus of true bugs

Platyvelia is a genus of smaller water striders in the family Veliidae. There are seven described species in Platyvelia.

== Species ==
These seven species belong to the genus Platyvelia:

- Platyvelia alvaradana (Drake & Hottes, 1952)
- Platyvelia annulipes (Champion, 1898)
- Platyvelia beameri (Hungerford, 1929)
- Platyvelia brachialis (Stål, 1860)
- Platyvelia maritima (J. Polhemus & Manzano, 1992)
- Platyvelia summersi (Drake, 1951)
- Platyvelia verana (Drake & Hottes, 1952)
