= Perittopus asiaticus =

Scientific classification
- Domain: Eukaryota
- Kingdom: Animalia
- Phylum: Arthropoda
- Class: Insecta
- Order: Hemiptera
- Suborder: Heteroptera
- Family: Veliidae
- Genus: Perittopus
- Species: P. asiaticus

Binomial name
- Perittopus asiaticus Zittel, 2001

Species of true bug

Perittopus asiaticus is a species of riffle bug from Malaysia, China, and Thailand.
