= Oporapa =

Coordinates: 2°03′N 75°58′W

- Municipality and town
- Flag Coat of arms

- Location of the municipality and town of Oporapa in the Huila Department of Colombia.
- Country: Colombia
- Department: Huila Department

Area
  - Total: 150 km^{2} (58 sq mi)

Population (Census 2018)
  - Total: 11,111
  - Density: 74/km^{2} (190/sq mi)
- Time zone: UTC-5 (Colombia Standard Time)

Oporapa is a town and municipality in the Huila Department, Colombia.
