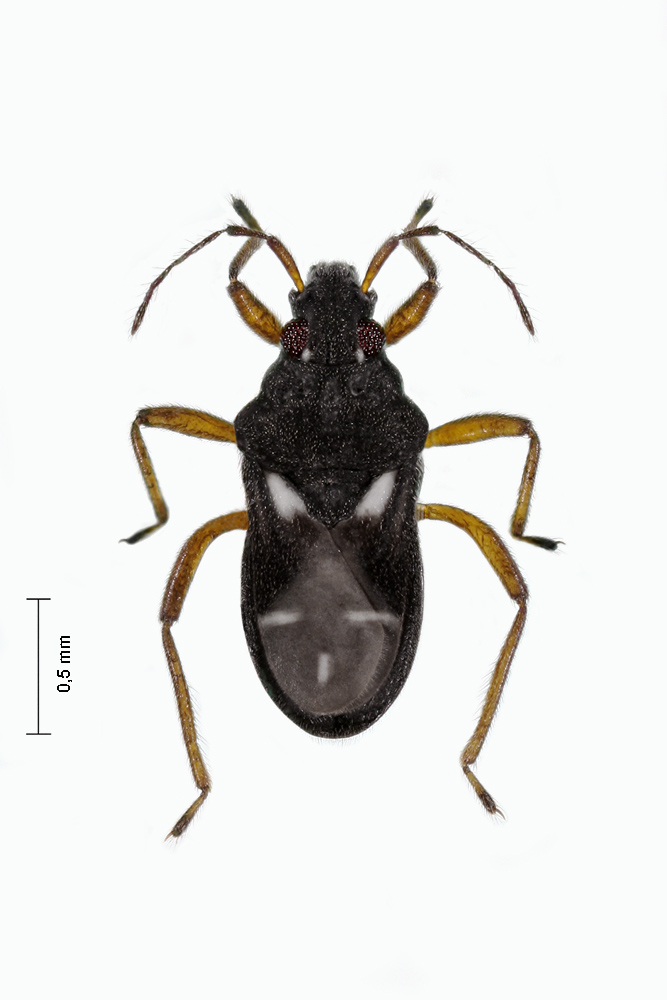
- Hebrus pusillus

Scientific classification
- Kingdom: Animalia
- Phylum: Arthropoda
- Clade: Pancrustacea
- Class: Insecta
- Order: Hemiptera
- Suborder: Heteroptera
- Family: Hebridae
- Subfamily: Hebrinae
- Genus: Hebrus; Curtis, 1831

Diversity
- At least 160 species

Synonyms
- Naeogeus Laporte, 1833

= Hebrus (bug) =

Genus of true bugs

Hebrus is a genus of velvet water bugs in the family Hebridae. There are at least 160 described species in Hebrus.

== See also ==
- List of Hebrus species
