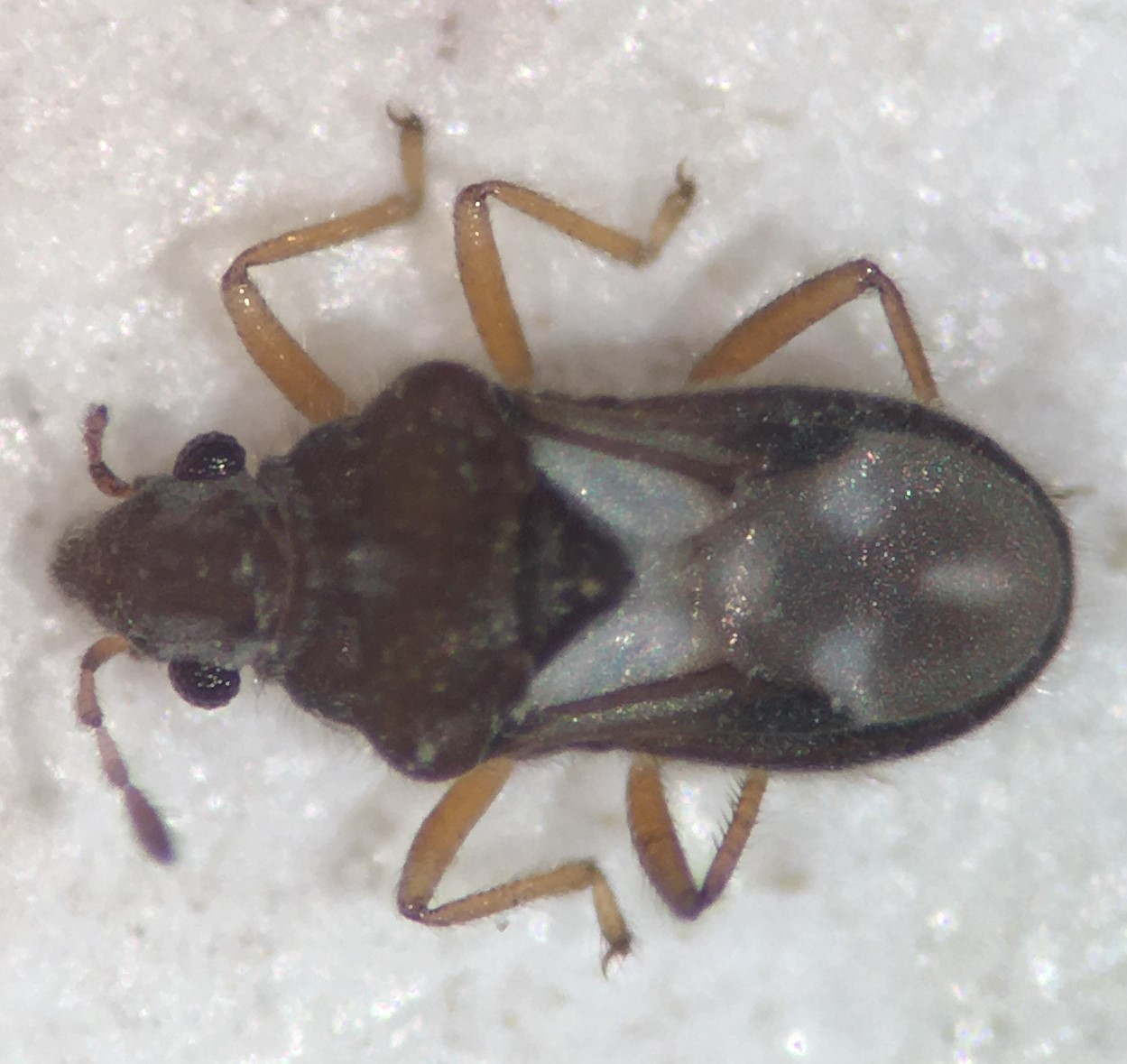

Scientific classification
- Domain: Eukaryota
- Kingdom: Animalia
- Phylum: Arthropoda
- Class: Insecta
- Order: Hemiptera
- Suborder: Heteroptera
- Infraorder: Gerromorpha
- Superfamily: Hebroidea
- Family: Hebridae

Genera
- subfamily Hebrinae; genus Hebrometra; genus Hebrus; genus Lipogomphus; genus Merragata; genus Neotimasius; genus Timasius; subfamily Hyrcaninae; genus Hyrcanus

= Velvet water bug =

Velvet water bugs

Family of true bugs

Velvet water bugs are members of the family Hebridae. They are semiaquatic insects that live among moss or ponds with an abundance of vegetation, in which they prey on small arthropods. Velvet water bugs are the smallest of the Gerromorpha, and have an appearance of tiny veliids. Hebrids sometimes move across water surfaces, but walk or run rather than skate or scull on the surface.

== Description ==
Hebrids are small, ranging from lengths of 1.3 to 3.7 mm. They have a characteristic layer of short, dense hairs that cover their entire bodies, except on their abdomens and appendages, from which they derive the common name "velvet water bug". They have tarsi in two segments, with their hing legs shorter than their bodies. Unlike the Veliidae and Mesoveliidae, they are known only as winged forms. These wings, however, may be well-developed to short or lacking. The wing's membrane, when it is present at all, lacks any distinct veins that are common of shore bugs Saldidae. They are typically dark-colored. The beak of hebrids is long and reaches to their middle pair of legs, and sits in a ventral groove on their heads. They also have apical claws, lacking the preapical claws of the Veliidae. Their pronota are broad, usually more so than the rest of their bodies.

== Habitat ==
Velvet water bugs live on floating vegetated portions of ponds, or similar regions which are permanently damp, which could be inside mats of moss or in interstices, but also sloping stream banks which may have sparse vegetation. Certain species may be adapted to a particular habitat. Members of the genera Timasius and Hebrometra, for instance, live on waterwashed rocks near streams or waterfalls. A few species are able to tolerate saline, brackish, or marine conditions. One species, Hebrus ruficeps, can tolerate being frozen over winter in ice among Sphagnum. The original common habitat of this family, however, was probably humid terrestrial or marginally aquatic.

Hebrids lay their eggs on some sort of substrate, like on a moss, but attach them lengthwise with a gel-like substance. They are found worldwide, with their greatest diversity in Asian tropical regions.

== Systematics ==
The Hebridae are the only family within the superfamily Hebroidea. The 160 species are placed in seven genera. Hebrids are divided between two recognized subfamilies. The first is Hebrinae, which have eyes located near the base of the head, and antennae that are clearly longer than the head, and the parameres is generally symmetrical. It includes the genera of Hebrometra (Cobben), a genus of four species from Ethiopia, Hebrus (Curtis), the family's largest genus consisting of 110 species, Lipogomphus (Berg), four species from the Americas, Merragata (Buchanan-White), of several species, Neotimasius (Andersen), of one southern Indian species, and Timasius (Distant), a genus of 15 species that ranges from Sri Lanka to Taiwan. The second subfamily is Hyrcaninae, which have eyes clearly removed from the pronotum's anterior margin. The length of the antennae is less or equal to that of the head. Also, the ventral arolium is distinctly longer than the dorsal arolium, and the parameres is symmetrical. This subfamily has only one included genus, Hyrcanus (Distant), of four Asian species.
