= Aquatic insect =

Insect that lives in water

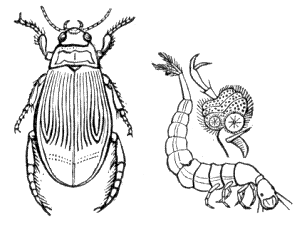
A water beetle

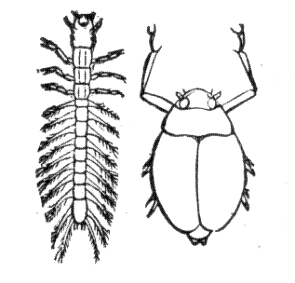
A whirligig beetle

Aquatic insects or water insects live some portion of their life cycle in the water. They feed in the same ways as other insects. Some diving insects, such as predatory diving beetles, can hunt for food underwater where land-living insects cannot compete.

== Breathing ==
Aquatic insects must get oxygen while they are under water. Almost all animals require a source of oxygen to live. Insects draw air into their bodies through spiracles, holes found along the sides of the abdomen. These spiracles are connected to tracheal tubes where oxygen can be absorbed. All aquatic insects have become adapted to their environment with the specialization of these structures, enabling:

1. Simple diffusion over a relatively thin integument
2. Temporary use of an air bubble
3. Extraction of oxygen from water using a plastron or blood gill
4. Storage of oxygen in hemoglobin and hemocyanin molecules in hemolymph
5. Taking oxygen from surface via breathing tubes (siphons)

The nymphs of the hemimetabolous orders mayflies, dragonflies and stoneflies, and the larvae of the holometabolous orders megalopterans and caddisflies, possess tracheal gills, which are outgrowths of the body wall containing a dense network of tracheae covered by a thin cuticle through which oxygen in the water can diffuse.

Some insects have densely packed hairs (setae) around the spiracles that allow air to remain near, while keeping water away from, the body. The trachea open through spiracles into this air film, allowing access to oxygen. In many such cases, when the insect dives into the water, it carries a layer of air over parts of its surface, and breathes using this trapped air bubble until it is depleted, then returns to the surface to repeat the process. Other types of insects have a plastron or physical gill that can be various combinations of hairs, scales, and undulations projecting from the cuticle, which hold a thin layer of air along the outer surface of the body. In these insects, the volume of the film is small enough, and their respiration slow enough, that diffusion from the surrounding water is enough to replenish the oxygen in the pocket of air as fast as it is used. The large proportion of nitrogen in the air dissolves in water slowly and maintains the gas volume, supporting oxygen diffusion. Insects of this type only rarely need to replenish their supply of air.

Other aquatic insects can remain under water for long periods due to high concentrations of hemoglobin in their hemolymph circulating freely within their body. Hemoglobin bonds strongly to oxygen molecules.

A few insects such as water scorpions and mosquito larvae have breathing tubes ("siphons") with the opening surrounded by hydrofuge hairs, allowing them to breathe without having to leave the water.

== Locomotion ==
Aquatic insects use many different methods of locomotion in water. Some aquatic insects are neuston, meaning that they move along the surface of the water. This includes springtails, water striders, whirligig beetles, and, in times of flood, ants such as red imported fire ants. Many insects walk along the bottom of a water body. This includes beetles, and the larvae of mayflies, dragonflies, damselflies and stoneflies. Dragonflies and damselfly larvae can also move through jet propulsion by pushing water through their gills, allowing them to quickly escape predators. Swimming is also commonly utilized.

== Orders with aquatic or semiaquatic species ==
- Collembola - springtails (which are not technically insects, but are closely related)
- Ephemeroptera - mayflies
- Odonata - dragonflies and damselflies
- Plecoptera - stoneflies
- Megaloptera - alderflies, fishflies, and dobsonflies
- Neuroptera - lacewings
- Coleoptera - beetles
- Hemiptera - true bugs (water striders, giant water bugs)
- Hymenoptera - ants (e.g. Polyrhachis sokolova) and wasps (e.g. Microgaster godzilla)
- Diptera - flies
- Mecoptera - scorpionflies
- Lepidoptera - moths
- Trichoptera - caddisflies

EPT insects, an acronym for Ephemeroptera, Plecoptera and Trichoptera (mayflies, stoneflies and caddisflies), are sensitive to pollutants and are used as an indicator of water quality in streams, rivers and lakes.

== Marine aquatic insects ==
Aquatic insects live mostly in freshwater habitats, and there are very few marine insect species. The only true examples of pelagic insects are the sea skaters, which belongs to the order Hemiptera, and there are a few types of insects that live in the intertidal zone, including larvae of caddisflies from the family Chathamiidae, the hemipteran Aepophilus bonnairei, and a few other taxa.
