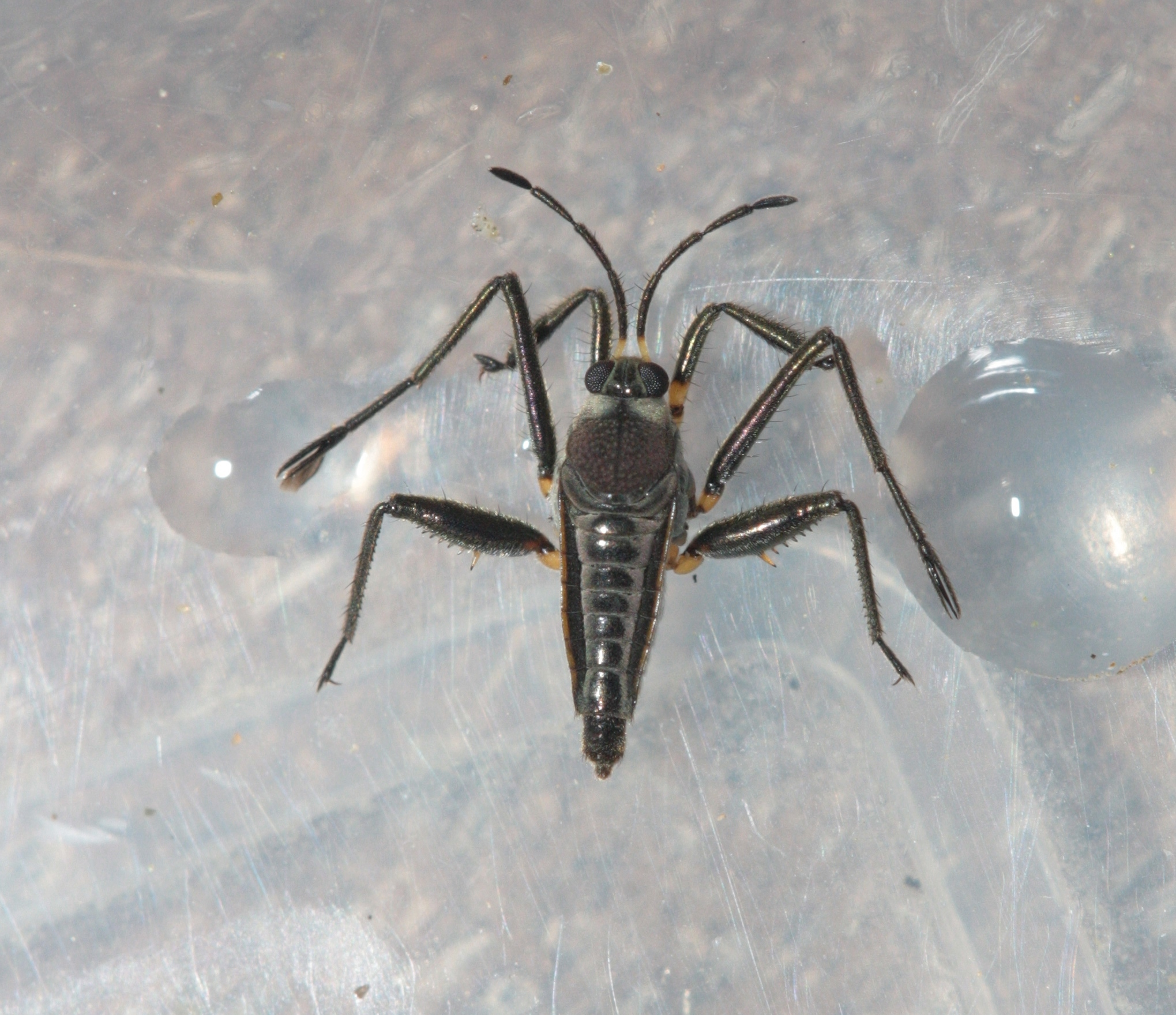
- Rhagovelia distincta

Scientific classification
- Kingdom: Animalia
- Phylum: Arthropoda
- Class: Insecta
- Order: Hemiptera
- Suborder: Heteroptera
- Family: Veliidae
- Genus: Rhagovelia; Mayr, 1865

Diversity
- at least 390 species

Synonyms
- Trochopus Carpenter, 1898

= Rhagovelia =

Genus of true bugs

Rhagovelia is a genus of smaller water striders in the family Veliidae. There are at least 390 described species in Rhagovelia.

Rhagovelia can be gregarious and form swarms. Morton Arboretum, Illinois

It was reported in 2025 that the biophysical properties of members of this genus had been used to design feet for water strider-like robots.

== Evolution ==
=== Origins ===
The origins of the genus are among water striders of Veliidae family without propelling fans on their legs.

=== Evolution from water striders ===
==== Genes 'geisha' and 'mother-of-geisha' ====
The duplication of genes, called by researchers 'geisha' and 'mother-of-geisha', caused evolutionary creation of propelling fans on middle pair of water strider's legs which in its turn has made able for species in the genus to walk across more fast-flowing and turbulent streams.

== See also ==
- List of Rhagovelia species
