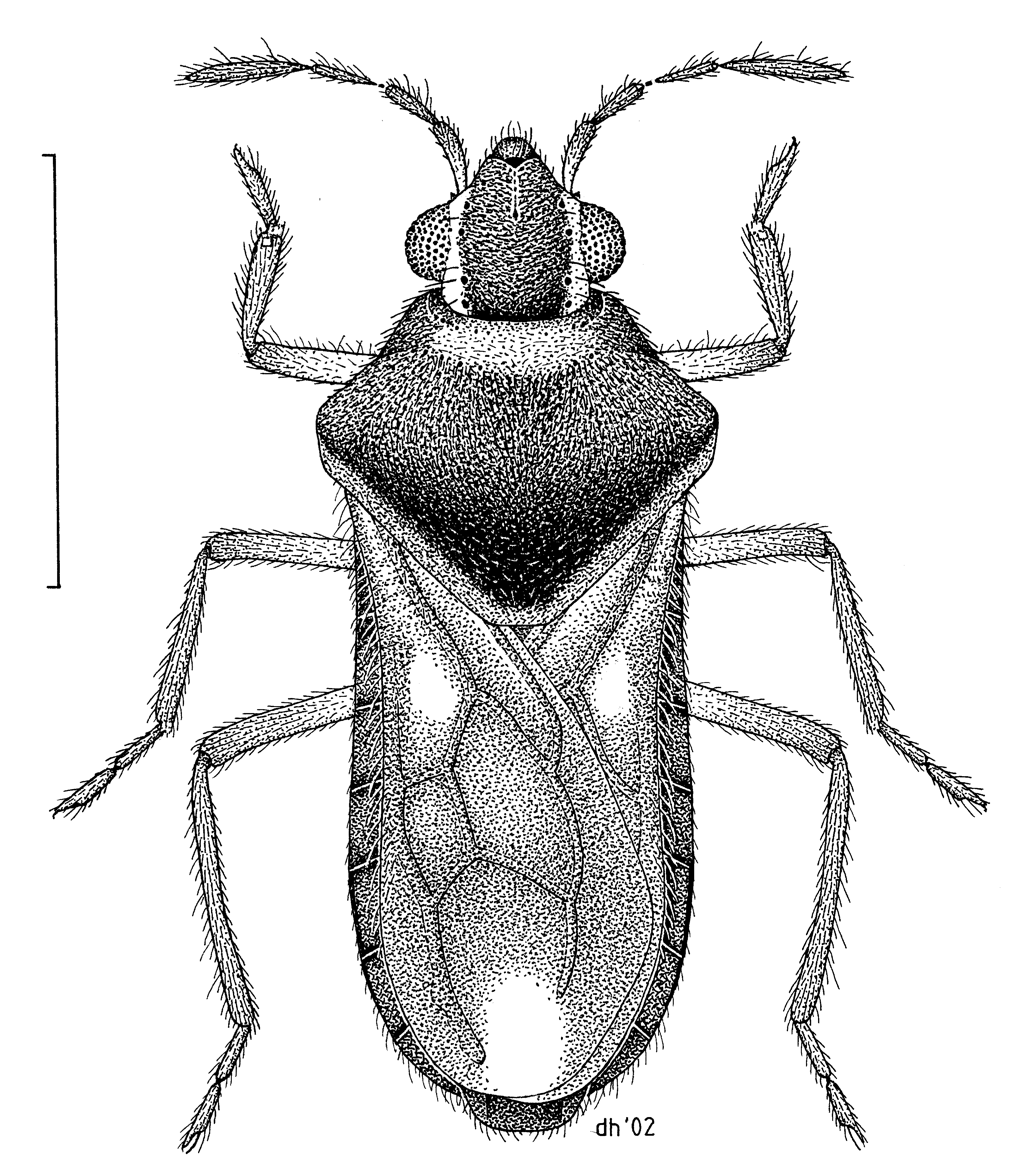
- Microvelia macgregori

Scientific classification
- Kingdom: Animalia
- Phylum: Arthropoda
- Clade: Pancrustacea
- Class: Insecta
- Order: Hemiptera
- Suborder: Heteroptera
- Superfamily: Gerroidea
- Family: Veliidae; Amyot & Serville, 1843

= Veliidae =

Riffle bugs Temporal range: Tithonian–Present

Family of true bugs

Veliidae is a family of gregarious predatory insects in the suborder Heteroptera. They are commonly known as riffle bugs, small water striders, or broad-shouldered water striders because the segment immediately behind the head is wider than the rest of the abdomen. Species of the genus Rhagovelia are also referred to as ripple bugs.

Veliidae have a specialized body plan that allows them to walk on water and are neuston. The family Gerridae is another closely related group that is also neuston and both are in the superfamily Gerroidea. Veliidae are smaller however, between 1.5 and 6 mm (0.059 and 0.236 in). They can be found on ponds, near lake shores, and in rivers worldwide. Some species can also be found on plants near water, in salt water or in mud flats.

== Description ==
Veliidae are very similar to Gerridae. The most consistent characteristic used to separate these two families are internal genitalia differences, however external cues are usually sufficient to tell the families apart.

A general description is as follows: an oval to elongate body covered with hydrofuge hairs. Wings can be present or absent; when present the wings range from well devolved to vestigial. The four segmented antennae is longer than the head and readily visible. The antennae is non-aristate. The eyes are usually large, but there are no ocelli.

Males and females can be differentiated by the fore tibiae. Males have smaller tibiae with a grasping comb, as opposed to the larger plain female tibiae.

== Distribution ==
Veliidae is the largest gerromorphan family and has almost 1173 species and 66 genera. The present distribution of marine representatives of Veliidae and Gerridae points to two centers of origin: one in the Indo-Malayan region and another on the shores of the Caribbean Sea. The geographical distance between these points is probably due to continental drift. They are now present across all continents (except Antarctica).

== Life cycle ==
Like all Heteroptera, the Veliidae go through an egg, nymph and adult stage. They have four or five nymphal instars. Both the adults and nymphs live together gregariously, in loose communities and can often be found in large groups. Eggs are usually laid underwater, attached to the stream bed, rocks or plant material and held together by a gelatinous substance. In most species females lay under 30 eggs. Nymphs are very similar to adults, but have one segmented tarsus on mid and hind leg as opposed to the adults' two. Some species prefer rapids or riffles in streams but many prefer calmer water.

== Behaviour ==
Veliidae can walk on water because they take advantage of the high surface tension of water and have hydrophobic legs that distribute their weight across more water.

Although Gerridae typically have longer legs, Veliidae also have legs that spread out the weight over a relatively large area. Thousands of hydrofugal hairs also coat the entire body, mitigating potential problems incurred by water contact: air bubbles, trapped among the tiny hairs if the insect is submerged, lift the insect towards the surface again.

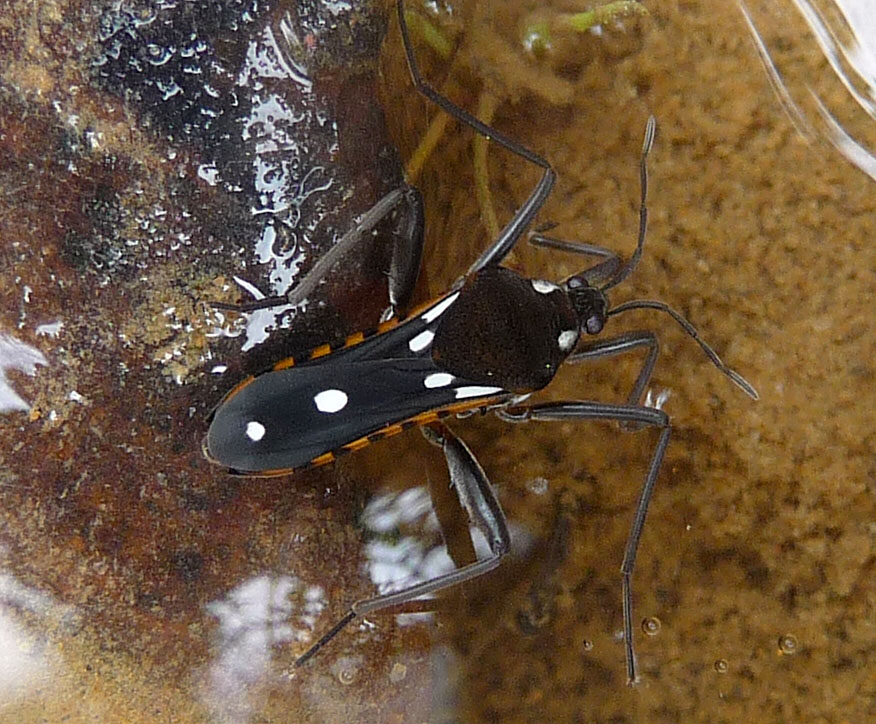
Velia rivulorum

== Taxonomy ==
The following genera are recognised in the family Veliidae:

- Adriennella Poisson, 1942
- Aegilipsicola J.Polhemus & D.Polhemus, 1994
- Aegilipsovelia J.Polhemus, 1970
- Aenictovelia Polhemus, 1979
- Altavelia Polhemus, Molano, Morales, Moreira & Floriano, 2019
- Angilia Stål, 1865
- Angilovelia Andersen, 1981
- Aphrovelia J.Polhemus & D.Polhemus, 1988
- Aquulavelia Thirumalai, 1999
- Arcantivelia Solórzano Kraemer & Perrichot, 2014
- Austromicrovelia Andersen & Weir, 2003
- Balticovelia Andersen, 2000
- Baptista Distant, 1904
- Barbivelia Andersen & Weir, 2003
- Brechivelia D.Polhemus & J.Polhemus, 2004
- Callivelia Polhemus, 2021
- Carayonella Poisson, 1948
- Chenevelia Zettel, 1996
- Cylicovelia J.Polhemus & Copeland, 1996
- Drepanovelia Andersen & Weir, 2001
- Electrovelia Andersen, 1998
- Entomovelia Esaki, 1930
- Euvelia Drake, 1957
- Eyarinella Zettel & Laciny, 2021
- Fijivelia J.Polhemus & D.Polhemus, 2006
- Geovelia Zimmermann, 1984
- Gracilovelia Poisson, 1955
- Haldwania Tamanini, 1955
- Halovelia Bergroth, 1893
- Haloveloides Andersen, 1992
- Hebrovelia Lundblad, 1939
- Husseyella Herring, 1955
- Lacertovelia Andersen & Weir, 2001
- Lathriovelia Andersen, 1989
- Macrovelia Tamanini, 1947
- Mangrovelia Linnavuori, 1977
- Menuthiasia Poisson, 1952
- Microvelia Westwood, 1834
- Microveloidella Poisson, 1952
- Microvelopsis Andersen & Weir, 2001
- Millotella Poisson, 1948
- Neoalardus Distant, 1912
- Nesidovelia Andersen & Weir, 2001
- Neusterensifer J.Polhemus & D.Polhemus, 1994
- Nilsvelia Cassis, Hodgins, Weir & Tatarnic, 2017
- Ocellovelia China & Usinger, 1949
- Ocheovelia J.Polhemus & D.Polhemus, 2006
- Ochthecorisa Montrouzier, 1864
- Oiovelia Drake & Maldonado-Capriles, 1952
- Pacificovelia Andersen & Weir, 2003
- Papuavelia D.Polhemus & J.Polhemus, 2000
- Paravelia Breddin, 1898
- Perittopus Fieber, 1861
- Petrovelia Andersen & Weir, 2001
- Phoreticovelia D.Polhemus & J.Polhemus, 2000
- Platyvelia J.Polhemus & D.Polhemus, 1993
- Plesiovelia Tamanini, 1955
- Polhemovelia Zettel & Sehnal, 2000
- Pseudovelia Hoberlandt, 1951
- Rhagovelia Mayr, 1865
- Rheovelia D.Polhemus & J.Polhemus, 2004
- Shaverdinia Zettel & Laciny, 2021
- Starmuhlneria Poisson, 1964
- Steinovelia J.Polhemus & D.Polhemus, 1993
- Stridulivelia Hungerford, 1929
- Strongylovelia Esaki, 1924
- Submicrovelia Poisson, 1951
- Tanyvelia J.Polhemus & D.Polhemus, 1994
- Tarsovelia J.Polhemus & D.Polhemus, 1994
- Tarsoveloides Andersen & Weir, 2001
- Tenagovelia Kirkaldy, 1908
- Tetraripis Lundblad, 1936
- Thirumalaia Zettel & Laciny, 2021
- Tonkouivelia Linnavuori, 1977
- Tubuaivelia J.Polhemus & D.Polhemus, 2008
- Velia Latreille, 1804
- Velohebria Stys, 1976
- Veloidea Gould, 1934
- Xenobates Esaki, 1927
- Xiphovelia Lundblad, 1933
- Xiphoveloidea Hoberlandt, 1951
