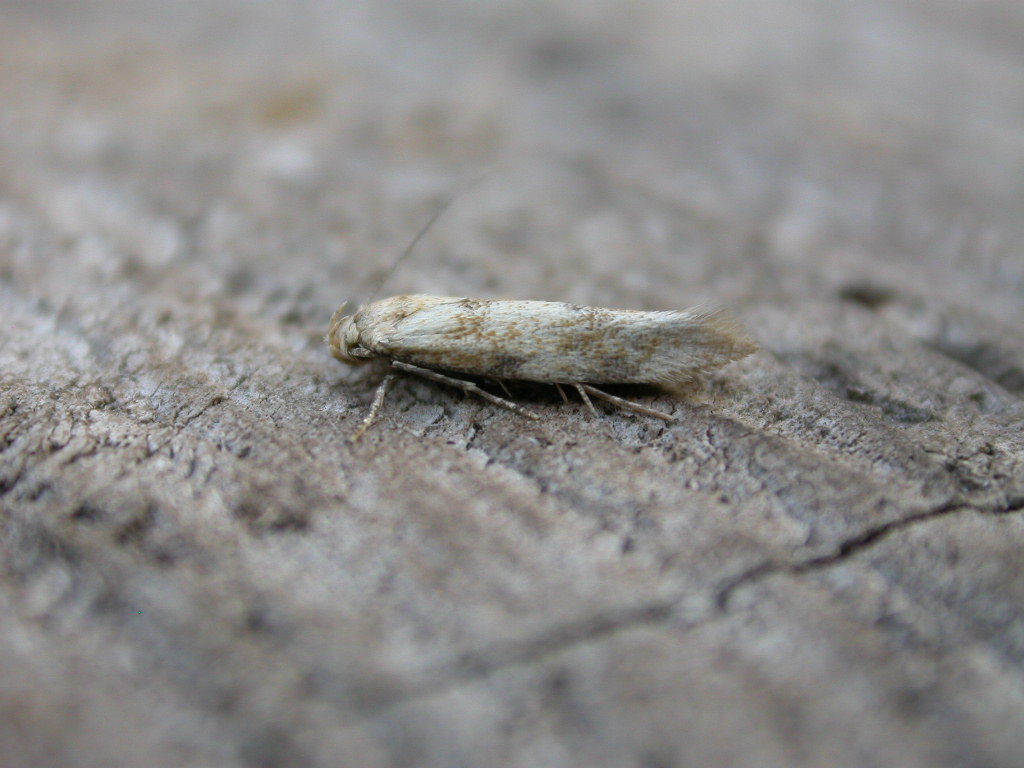

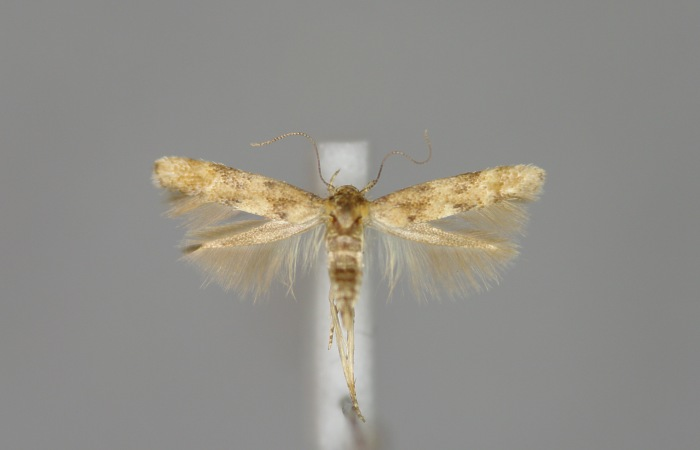

Scientific classification
- Kingdom: Animalia
- Phylum: Arthropoda
- Class: Insecta
- Order: Lepidoptera
- Family: Momphidae
- Genus: Mompha
- Species: M. epilobiella

Binomial name
- Mompha epilobiella (Denis & Schiffermüller, 1775)

Synonyms
- List: Tinea epilobiella Denis & Schiffermuller, 1775; Recurvaria fulvescens Haworth, 1828; Cleodora nebulella Stephens, 1834

= Mompha epilobiella =

Species of moth

Mompha epilobiella is a moth in the family Momphidae found in Europe and North America.

== Description ==
The wingspan is 10–13 mm. The head is yellowish white and brownish speckled. The thorax is ochre-coloured. The forewings are also ochre and greyish on the costal vein. An indistinct yellow spot is located on the costa at 3/4 of the length of the forewing, a similar spot is on the inner angle. Two small tufts of slightly protruding dark brown scales are located at 1/5 of the length of the forewing and in the middle of the inner edge of the wing. The hind wings shine grey.

The males differ from the similar species Mompha subbistrigella by the following characteristics: The saccule is shortened and has a group of small teeth apically. The Aedeagus has a hook-shaped cornutus and several straight cornuti.

In the females, the 8th tergite is rounded at the posterior end. The bursae duct has a narrow and short posterior part and an abruptly widened anterior part. Both parts have a conspicuous sclerotized plate with strongly sclerotized edges

Adults are on wing throughout the year, but are most common in July and August in Great Britain.

The larvae have been recorded feeding on rosebay willowherb (Chamerion angustifolium), great willowherb (Epilobium hirsutum), broad-leaved willowherb (Epilobium montanum), marsh willowherb (Epilobium palustre) and evening primrose (Oenothera species), but great willowherb is the main food plant. The other listed plants might be misidentifications. Young larvae probably live as leaf miners. Older larvae live, mostly communally, in spun uppermost leaves.

== Distribution ==
It has a Holarctic distribution, found in North America, including Ontario and all of Europe.
