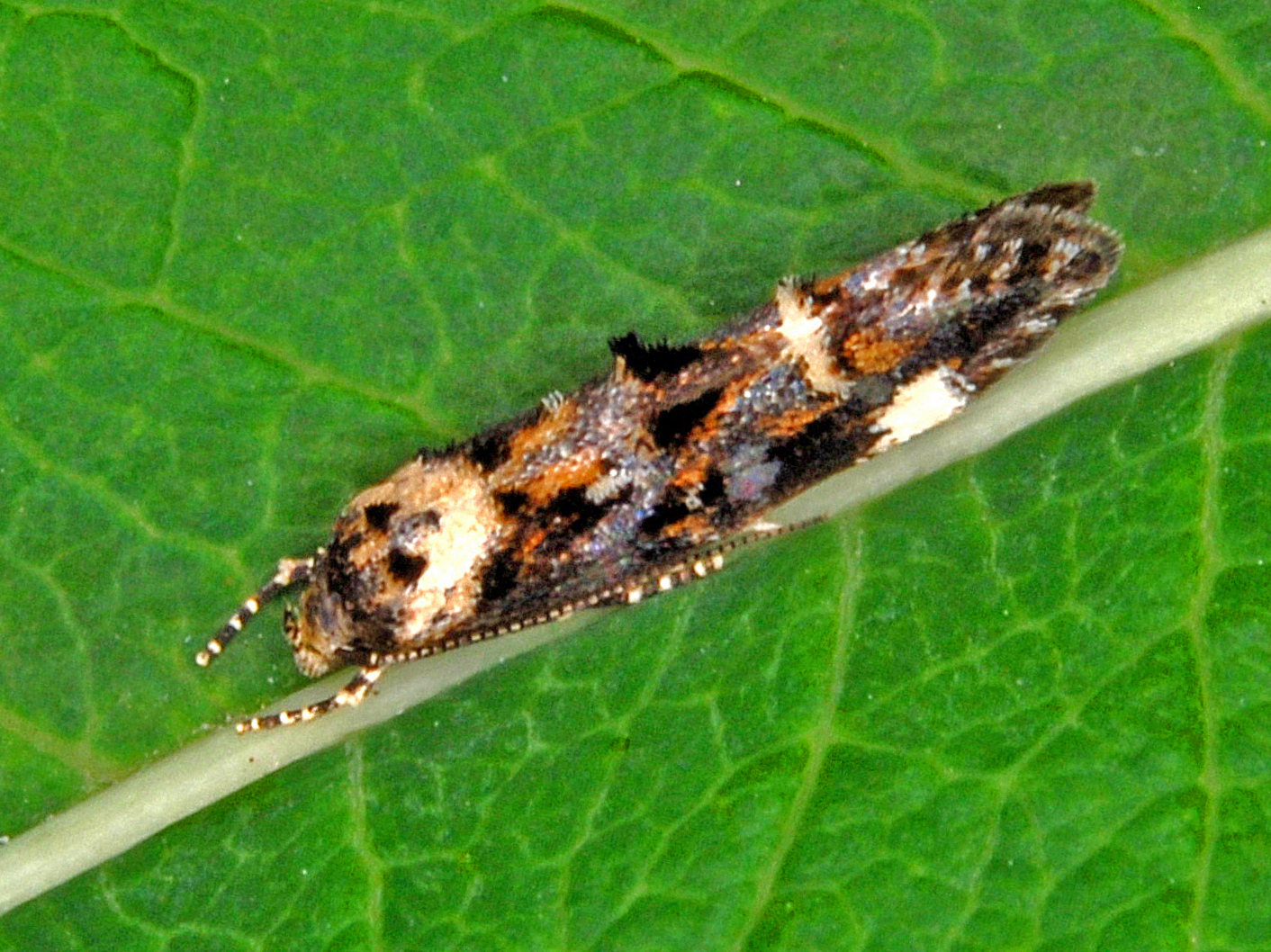
- Mompha conturbatella. Dorsal view

Scientific classification
- Kingdom: Animalia
- Phylum: Arthropoda
- Class: Insecta
- Order: Lepidoptera
- Family: Momphidae
- Genus: Mompha
- Species: M. conturbatella

Binomial name
- Mompha conturbatella (Hübner, 1819)

Synonyms
- Tinea conturbatella Hübner, [1819]; Lita elegantella Zetterstedt, 1840

= Mompha conturbatella =

Species of moth

Mompha conturbatella, also known as the fireweed mompha moth, is a moth in the family Momphidae found in Asia, Europe and North America. It was first described by Jacob Hübner in 1819.

== Distribution and habitat ==
This species has a Holarctic distribution. In the Palearctic, it is found from Europe through the Caucasus and central Asia to the Russian Far East. The species is also common in North America. These moths mainly occur in mountains, woodland, hedge rows and marshy areas.

== Description ==
Mompha conturbatella has a wingspan of 11–17 mm. Forewings of these moths show stains of various color, ranging from brown to black, bluish, russet and white. On the dorsum are present several raised tufts of scales. The head is dark fuscous, face whitish. Forewings dark fuscous, with several small scattered dull orange-ferruginous spots; an obscure whitish spot on base of dorsum; an oblique fascia before middle, a sometimes incomplete fascia in middle, a spot in disc posteriorly, another beyond tornus, and apical dot bluish-leaden-metallic; three black scale-tufts towards dorsum, and three less marked above them; a small white tornal spot, and large white costal spot beyond it. Hindwings rather dark fuscous. Larva blackish: in spun shoots of Epilobium anqustifolium. Similar are Mompha lacteella and Mompha propinquella differing in colouration and with genitalic differences.

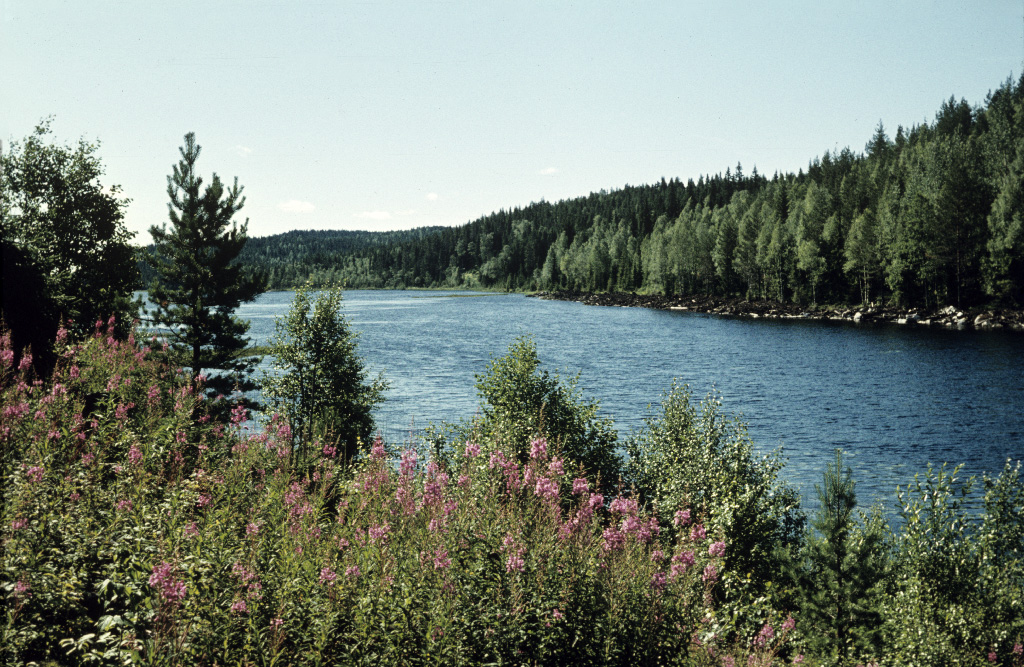
Habitat in Sweden

== Biology ==
Mompha conturbatella is a univoltine species. Adults are on wing from June to July. They feed on nectar of hogweed (Heracleum sphondylium) and rosebay willowherb or fireweed (Epilobium angustifolium).

The larvae feed on fireweed, dwarf fireweed (Epilobium latifolium) (and possibly broad-leaved willowherb (Epilobium montanum)). Larvae can be found from May to June. At the end of spring, the larvae live between spun together leaves at the tip of the plant and later into the stem. Pupation takes place in a yellowish brown cocoon in litter on the ground.
