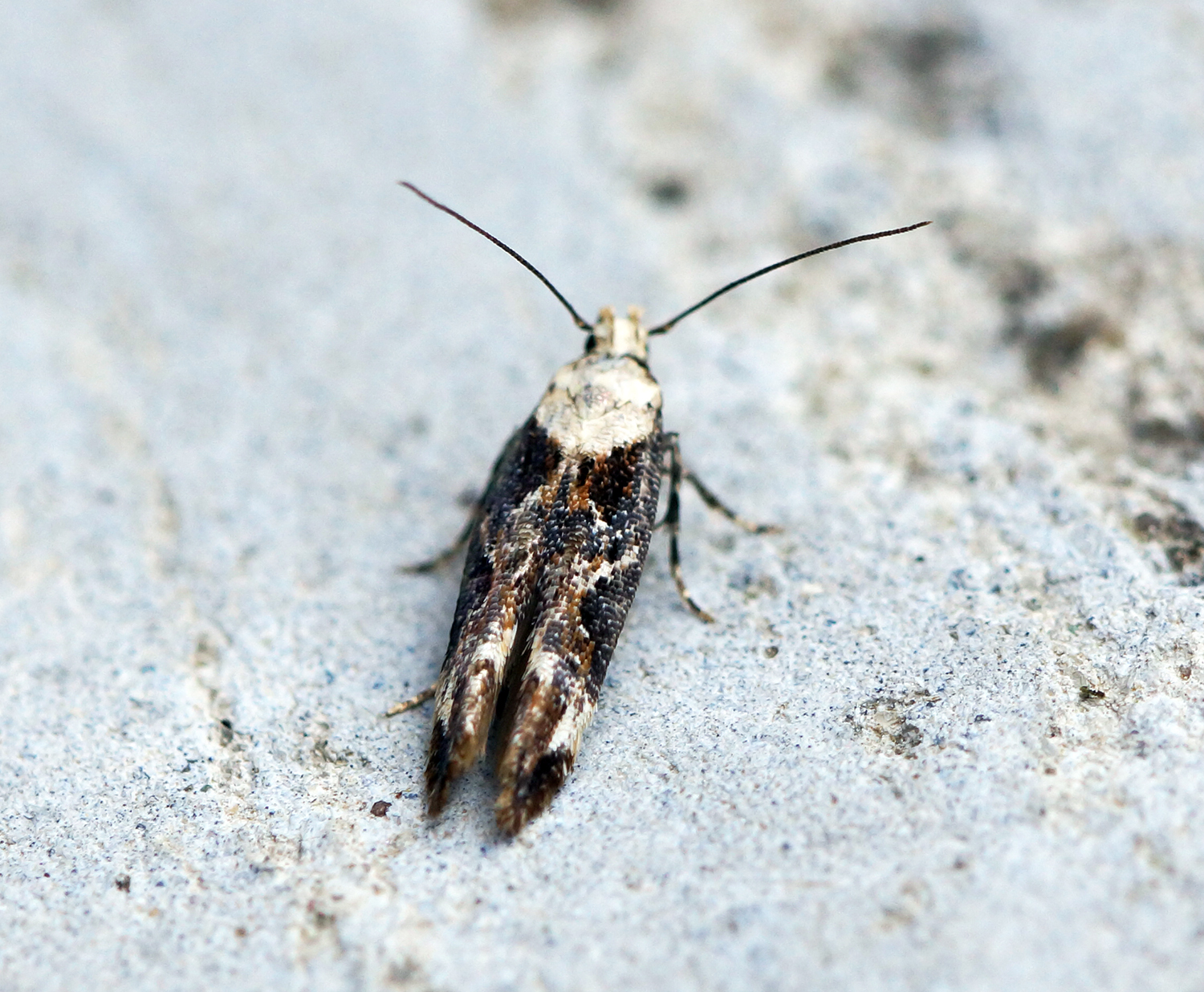

Scientific classification
- Domain: Eukaryota
- Kingdom: Animalia
- Phylum: Arthropoda
- Class: Insecta
- Order: Lepidoptera
- Family: Momphidae
- Genus: Mompha
- Species: M. divisella

Binomial name
- Mompha divisella Herrich-Schäffer, 1854

Synonyms
- Mompha decorella nec Haworth, 1812

= Mompha divisella =

Species of moth

Mompha divisella is a moth in the family Momphidae. It is found from southern Scandinavia to the Caucasus and central Asia.

== Description ==
The species is brown; its thorax is brown while the forewings are greyish brown. The head is white with inward-oblique and narrowed fascia which is 3/4 in length. The scales are light greyish brown and are measured 1/4, 1/2, and 3/4 from all sides. The dorsal of a basal part is white, while the hindwings are grey. Females have a broader abdomen and fascia, which is white, with the seventh segment is being greyish brown. The wingspan is 10–13 millimetres (0.39–0.51 in). Adults are on wing from August to May of the following year after overwintering.

=== Male genitalia ===
The male's cacullus is slender and slightly narrowed, with broader and rounded tip. Their sacculus is tapped gradually, but is slightly bent. The apex is blunt, reaching sometimes beyond the top of cacullus. Their body also have small anellus lobes, which are clavate. The aedeagus have three carnuti, which are of the same length. The left part is broad, and is also covered and hooked with microspicules. The middle part is bifurcate, and the last one is slender and a bit pointy, with a little distal hook.

=== Female genitalia ===
The female's posterior edge is distinct and U-shaped. The vigina of the sinus is funnel shaped, and is wider than the width of the ductus bursae. Their ductus seminalis is small and oval shaped, and is placed next to the posterior part of doctus borsae.

The species is similar to Mompha bradleyi, Mompha confusella, and Mompha subdivisella.

== Ecology ==
The larvae feed on willowherbs (Epilobium) species, including broad-leaved willowherb (Epilobium montanum), marsh willowherb (Epilobium palustre), hoary willowherb (Epilobium parviflorum), and spear-leaved willowherb (Epilobium lanceolatum). They have also been recorded on Epilobium alpinum and rosebay willowherb (Chamaenerion angustifolium).

=== Finnish diet ===
In Finland, the species feeds on fringed willowherb (Epilobium adenocaulon).
