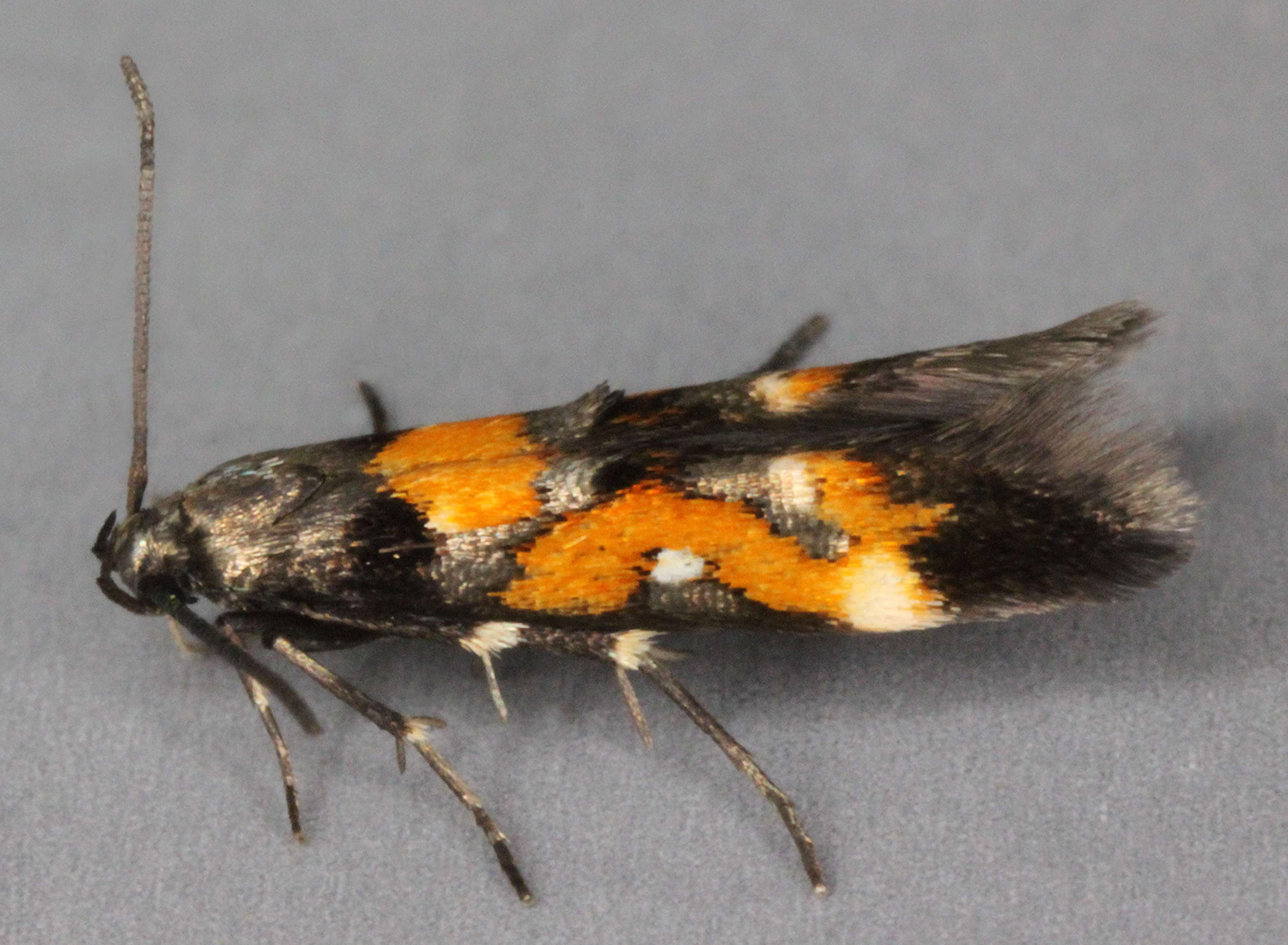

Scientific classification
- Kingdom: Animalia
- Phylum: Arthropoda
- Class: Insecta
- Order: Lepidoptera
- Family: Momphidae
- Genus: Mompha
- Species: M. locupletella

Binomial name
- Mompha locupletella (Denis & Schiffermüller, 1775)

Synonyms
- List: Tinea locupletella Denis & Schiffermüller, 1775; Tinea schrankella Hübner, [1805]; Adela pilipennella Zetterstedt, 1840; Psacaphora quadrilobella Herrich-Schäffer, [1854]

= Mompha locupletella =

Species of moth

Mompha locupletella is a moth in the family Momphidae that can be found in the Palearctic including Europe.

== Description ==
The wingspan is 9–12 millimetres (0.35–0.47 in).The head is dark leaden-metallic. Antennae with apex in female white. The forewings are orange, sometimes suffused with purple-brown; a black basal blotch, extended on costa, where it is preceded and followed by leaden-metallic spots, posterior often connected with a leaden-metallic black edged spot beyond it on dorsum; a wedge-shaped mark along middle of costa, and an oblique mark from dorsum before tornus leaden-metallic, black-edged; a blackish apical patch, preceded by a whitish costal spot. The hindwings are dark fuscous. The larva is greyish-green; head and plate of 2 black: in blotches in leaves of Epilobium alsinifolium. Note The forewing ground colour is bright orange decorated with white and silvery-grey marks.It closely resembles Mompha terminella.

There are generally two generations per year, although there is only one in the north. Adults of the first generation are on wing from the second half of May to the beginning of July. The second generation adults are on wing from August to the beginning of September.

The larvae feed on Epilobium alpestre, chickweed willowherb (Epilobium alsinifolium), spear-leaved willowherb (Epilobium lanceolatum), broad-leaved willowherb (Epilobium montanum), marsh willowherb (Epilobium palustre) and Epilobium roseum. Larvae can be found from April to May and from July to the beginning of August.

== Distribution ==
Mompha locupletella is found in northern Europe and mountainous areas in central and southern Europe, to north-western Spain. In the east, the range extends to Zabaykalsky Krai and the Kuril Islands in Russia.
