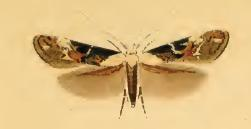

Scientific classification
- Kingdom: Animalia
- Phylum: Arthropoda
- Clade: Pancrustacea
- Class: Insecta
- Order: Lepidoptera
- Family: Momphidae
- Genus: Mompha
- Species: M. propinquella

Binomial name
- Mompha propinquella (Stainton, 1851)

Synonyms
- Elachista propinquella Stainton, 1851; Laverna palidicollella Doubleday 1859

= Mompha propinquella =

Species of moth

Mompha propinquella is a moth in the family Momphidae found in Europe.

== Description ==
The wingspan is 10–12 mm. The head and thorax are ochreous-white. The forewings are dark leaden fuscous, with several small scattered orange ferruginous spots on the dorsal half; an ochreous-white triangular blotch on base of dorsum, almost touching costa at base; one or two white dots beyond this; three black scale-tufts towards dorsum, and three others above them; a white and ferruginous line from costa before middle running round central tuft; a small white tornal spot and larger costal spot beyond it, disc near them suffused with ferruginous. The hindwings are dark fuscous. The larva is brown, marbled with pale; head and plate of 2 black: in blotches in leaves of Epilobium hirsutum. Cocoon within the mine. It closely resembles Mompha lacteella(Stephens, 1834) and Mompha ochraceella (Curtis, 1839)

Adults are on wing from the end of June to mid-September in one generation per year.

The larvae feed on great willowherb (Epilobium hirsutum) and broad-leaved willowherb (Epilobium montanum), mining the leaves of their host plant. The species overwinters in the larval stage.

== Distribution ==
It is found in most of Europe, except the Mediterranean islands and most of the Balkan Peninsula.
