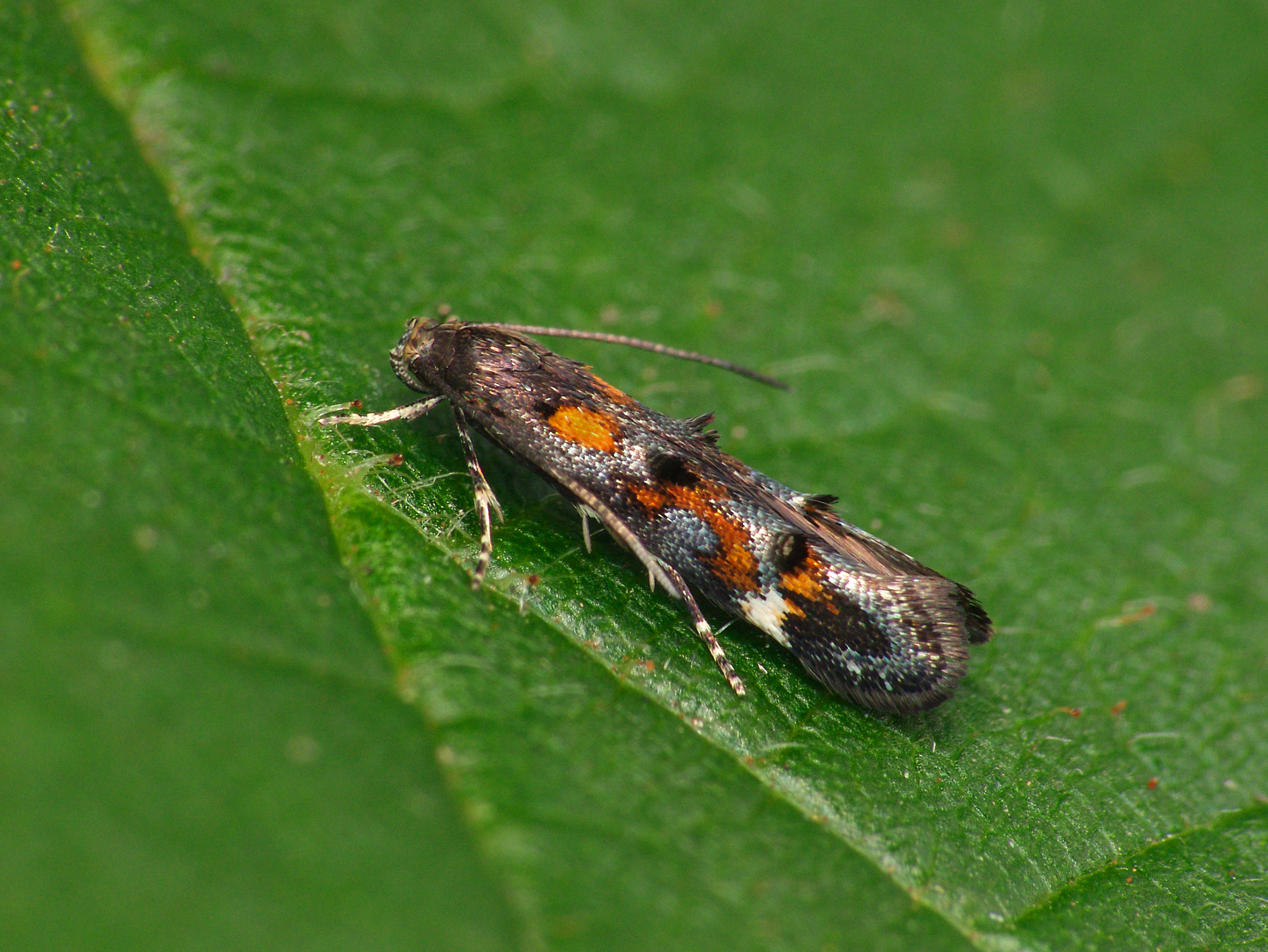

Scientific classification
- Kingdom: Animalia
- Phylum: Arthropoda
- Class: Insecta
- Order: Lepidoptera
- Family: Momphidae
- Genus: Mompha
- Species: M. raschkiella

Binomial name
- Mompha raschkiella (Zeller, 1838)

Synonyms
- Elachista raschkiella Zeller, 1838; Mompha (Psacaphora) raschkiella

= Mompha raschkiella =

Species of moth

Mompha raschkiella is a species of micromoth in the family Momphidae. The moth was first described by German entomologist Philipp Christoph Zeller in 1838.

== Description ==
The wingspan is 7–11 millimetres (0.3–0.4 in).The head is leaden metallic, the face silvery. Forewings dark fuscous; an orange-yellow dorsal spot towards base, followed by an oblique leaden-metallic fascia, beyond which is a black seale-tuft on fold; a leaden-metallic spot on middle of costa; a double orange spot in dise posteriorly, divided by a leaden-metallic spot beneath, and connected above with a white costal spot. Hindwings dark fuscous. Larva deep yellow, sides more orange; dorsal line green;head dark brown. The species could be confused with Mompha locupletella, but it lacks that species contrasting dark and light patches at the base of the forewing.

Adults are on wing in May and again in August. There are two generations per year. The moth is small and distinctively marked.

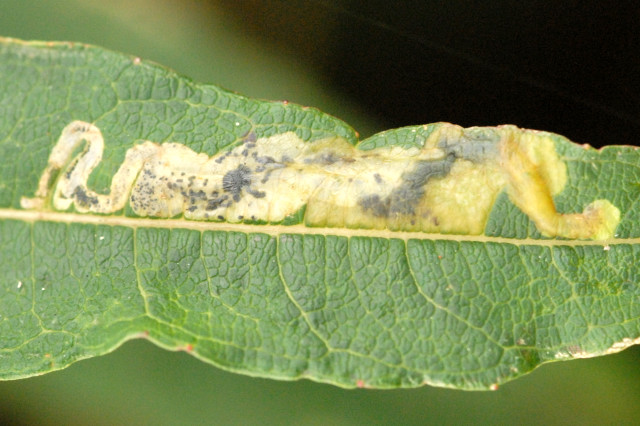
Leaf mine caused by M. raschkiella

=== Larvae ===
The oval eggs are laid on the surface of leaves, usually near the midrib. Larvae are yellow with a brown head and have a thoracic plate and an anal plate. They mine the leaves of rosebay willowherb (Epilobium angustifolium) causing a yellowish blotch on the leaves that bleach rapidly after the larvae leave them. The caterpillars occur in May to late July and late August to September They overwinter as a pupa and pupation occurs among detritus on the ground.

== Habitat ==
The species is endemic to Europe. They can be found in waste ground, woodland clearings, heathland, and roadside verges. The moth is rare in Belgium. The moth is common and widely distributed on the Isle of Wight and in southern Hampshire. They can be found in the woods of Northwich. The moth is common in Suffolk, especially in coastal areas and Brecks. The species has been recorded by the St. Helens Wilflife Recording Group as scarce in St. Helens, Merseyside. As of October 2009, the moth has been recorded in 9.6% of Huntingdonshire.
