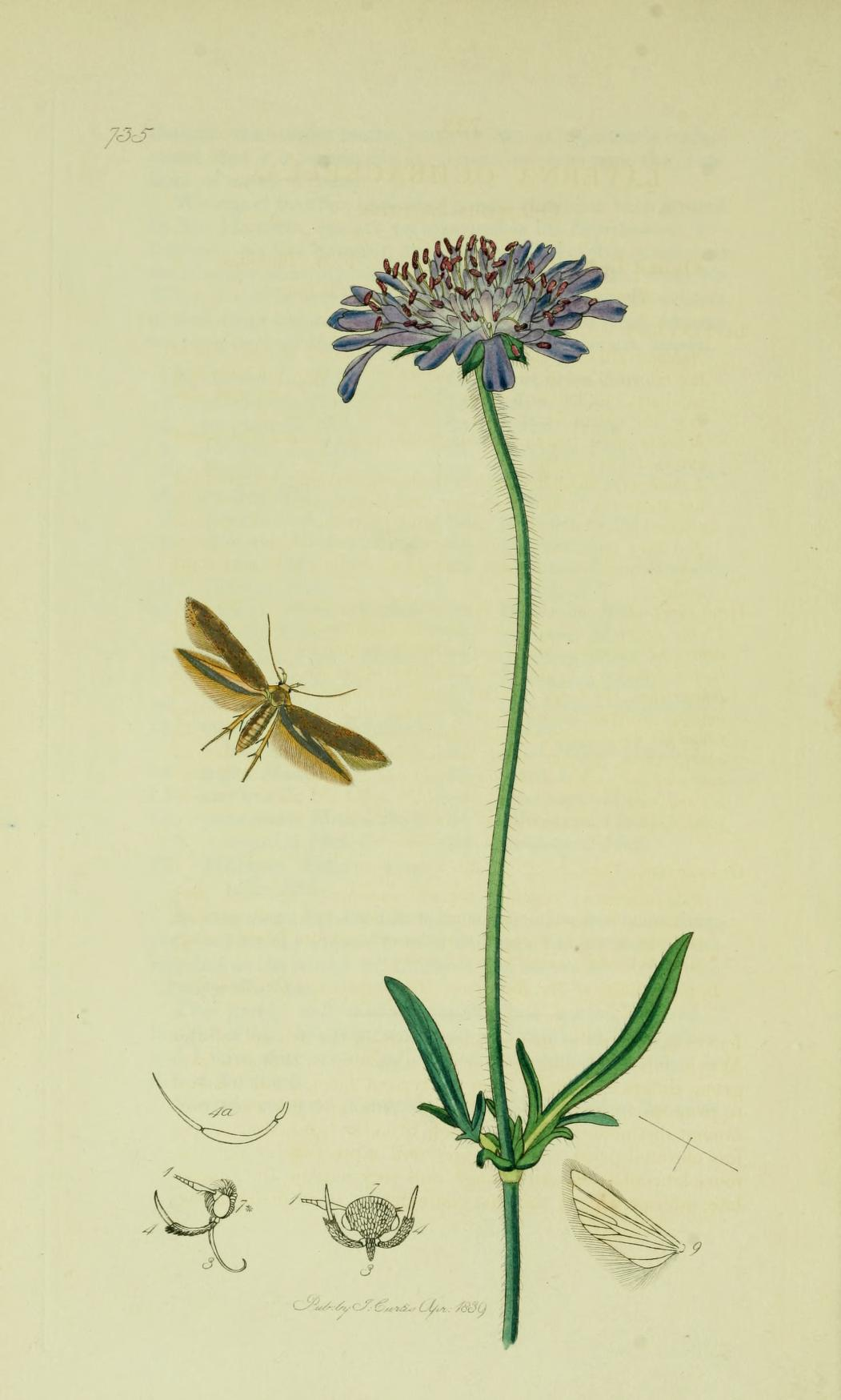
- Illustration from John Curtis's British Entomology Volume 6

Scientific classification
- Kingdom: Animalia
- Phylum: Arthropoda
- Clade: Pancrustacea
- Class: Insecta
- Order: Lepidoptera
- Family: Momphidae
- Genus: Mompha
- Species: M. ochraceella

Binomial name
- Mompha ochraceella (Curtis, 1839)

Synonyms
- Laverna ochraceella Curtis, 1839

= Mompha ochraceella =

Species of moth

Mompha ochraceella is a moth of the family Momphidae found in Africa, Asia and Europe.

== Description ==
The wingspan is 14–16 mm. The head is whitish-yellow ochreous. Forewings are yellow, suffusedly and irregularly irrorated with pale ferruginous; three darker scale-tufts above dorsum. Hindwings are whitish-yellowish. The larva is pale yellowish head pale brown. Mompha lacteella q.v. and Mompha propinquella are very similar.

Adults are on wing from May to August.

The larvae feed on willowherbs (Epilobium species), including great willowherb (Epilobium hirsutum).

== Distribution ==
It is found in most of Europe, ranging (in the south) to Morocco and Asia Minor. In the east, the range extends to the Caucasus and Iran.
