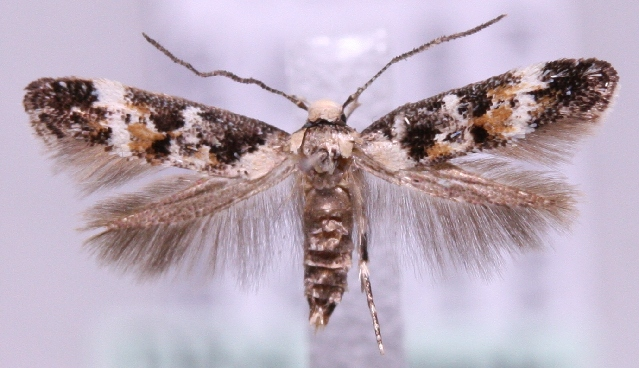

Scientific classification
- Kingdom: Animalia
- Phylum: Arthropoda
- Class: Insecta
- Order: Lepidoptera
- Family: Momphidae
- Genus: Mompha
- Species: M. lacteella

Binomial name
- Mompha lacteella (Stephens, 1834)

Synonyms
- List: Anacampsis lacteella Stephens, 1834; Elachista basipallidella Stainton, 1849; Elachista gibbiferella Zeller, 1839; Elchista propinquella Stainton, 1851; Laverna paludicolella Doubleday, 1859

= Mompha lacteella =

Species of moth

Mompha lacteella is a moth in the family Momphidae found in the Palearctic including Europe.

== Description ==
The wingspan is 11–13 mm.

Short - The head is whitish-ochreous. Thorax pale ferruginous-ochreous, anteriorly sprinkled with dark fuscous. Forewings as in Mompha propinquella, but blotch at base of dorsum pale ferruginous-ochreous. Hindwings dark fuscous.

Long - The head is beige, the third segment of the labial palps has brown median and subapical rings. The thorax and tegulae are beige. The forewings are greyish-black and have some large, irregular, orange-brown stripes and some white spots. At the base of the wing there is a large beige spot on the inner edge of the wing. It has the same coloration as the thorax and is surrounded by tufts of protruding scales on the costal fold and near the inner edge of the wings. Large tufts of protruding black scales are present in front of the centre and below the costal fold. A white costal spot is located at 3/4 of the length of the forewing. Opposite on the inner edge of the wing is a white spot that is distally provided with protruding scales. The apical area is greyish-black, a few white lines reach into the fringed scales. The hind wings shine dark grey. In the males, the cucullus is about five times as long as it is wide. The saccule is quite slender and as long as the cucullus. It tapers easily to a blunt apex. The gnathos is weakly triangular. The anellus lobes are more than half as long as the aedeagus and distally dilated and lobed. The Aedeagus is provided with two cornuti; One is long and very slender, the second is short and fork-shaped. In females, the genital armature of Mompha ochraceella differs by the wide and almost square lamella antevaginalis, the inverted V-shaped lamella postvaginalis, and the considerable sclerotization in the anterior part of the ductus bursae. A similar species is Mompha propinquella, which differs from M. lacteella by the white head and thorax as well as by the white base on the upper side of the forewing.

Adults are on wing from May to July.

The larvae feed on great willowherb (Epilobium hirsutum) and broad-leaved willowherb (Epilobium montanum), mining the leaves of their host plant. Larvae can be found from March to April.

Pupation takes place inside the mine or in the ground.

== Distribution ==
It is found in most of Europe, except the southern parts of the continent. In the east, the range extends through Asia Minor, the Caucasus, eastern Transcaucasia and southern Siberia to the Russian Far East.
