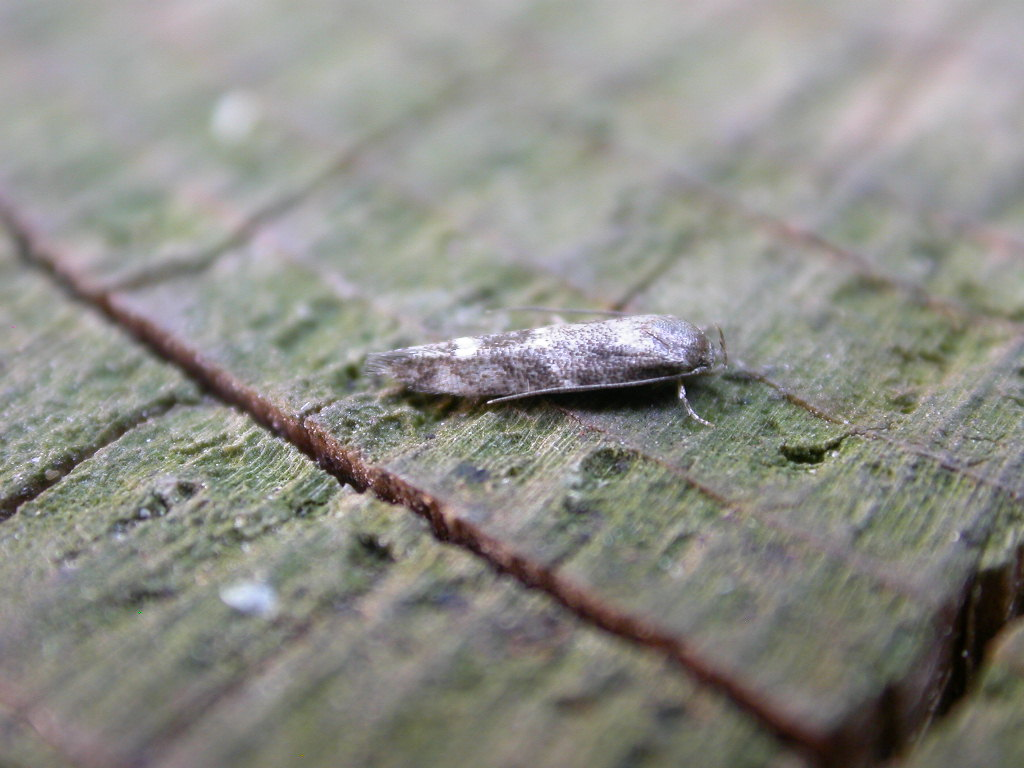

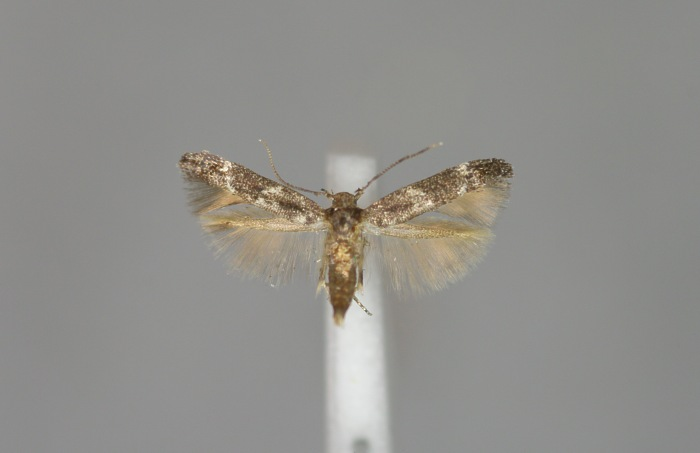

Scientific classification
- Kingdom: Animalia
- Phylum: Arthropoda
- Class: Insecta
- Order: Lepidoptera
- Family: Momphidae
- Genus: Mompha
- Species: M. subbistrigella

Binomial name
- Mompha subbistrigella (Haworth, 1828)

Synonyms
- Tinea subbistrigella Haworth, 1828

= Mompha subbistrigella =

Species of moth

Mompha subbistrigella, the garden cosmet, is a moth of the Momphidae family found in most of Europe.

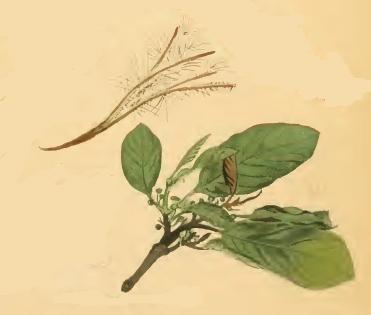
A seed pod of Epilobium eaten by larva

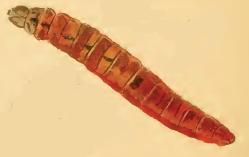
Larva

== Description ==
The wingspan is 7–11.5 mm.The forewing.The head is grey, the face whitish. The forewings are dark fuscous, in disc posteriorly mixed with light ferruginous-ochreous; sometimes bright orange.There is an ochreous-whitish blotch on base of dorsum, almost reaching the sta at base; a whitish fascia before middle, narrow on costa and broadly dilated downwards and two blackish scale-tufts on fold before -beyond this; an inwardly oblique white fascia towards apex, sometimes narrowly interrupted. The hindwings are grey.The larva is deep red, the incisions paler or yellow-whitish' The head is pale yellow-brown :in seedpods of Epilobiwm montanum.M. subbistrigella resembles other Mompha (especially Mompha sturnipennella) and determination relies on the differences in the structure of both male and female genitalia.

Adults are on wing from late summer to late spring.

The larvae feed within the seedpods of broad-leaved willowherb (Epilobium montanum) and occasionally on other willowherb (Epilobium species).
