= Mompha jurassicella =

Scientific classification
- Domain: Eukaryota
- Kingdom: Animalia
- Phylum: Arthropoda
- Class: Insecta
- Order: Lepidoptera
- Family: Momphidae
- Genus: Mompha
- Species: M. jurassicella

Binomial name
- Mompha jurassicella (Frey, 1881)

Synonyms
- List: Mompha subdivisella Bradley, 1951; Laverna iurassicolella Reutti, 1898; Laverna jurassicella Frey, 1881

Species of moth

Mompha jurassicella is a moth in the family Momphidae that can be found in western Europe. The range extends to Switzerland in the east.

== Description ==
The species is greyish brown and has a wingspan of 11–13 millimetres (0.43–0.51 in). The wings carry discarded markings, and have indistinct pattern. Adults are on wing from August to October and from March to April after overwintering.

=== Male genitalia ===
The male species sacculus is tapped distally, but is slightly bent. The apex is blunt, reaching sometimes beyond the top of cacullus. Their body also have small anellus lobes, which are clavate. The aedeagus have three carnuti, which are of the same length. The left part is broad, and is also covered and hooked with microspicules. The middle part is bifurcate, and the last one is slender and a bit pointy, with a little distal hook. The male genitalia is similar to the one of Mompha divisella, but is different in a way that it have much more abruptly tapped sacculus and corni of different length.

== Ecology ==
The larvae feed on great willowherb (Epilobium hirsutum), initially feeding inside the stem. Up to three stem mines may be found in a single plant.
