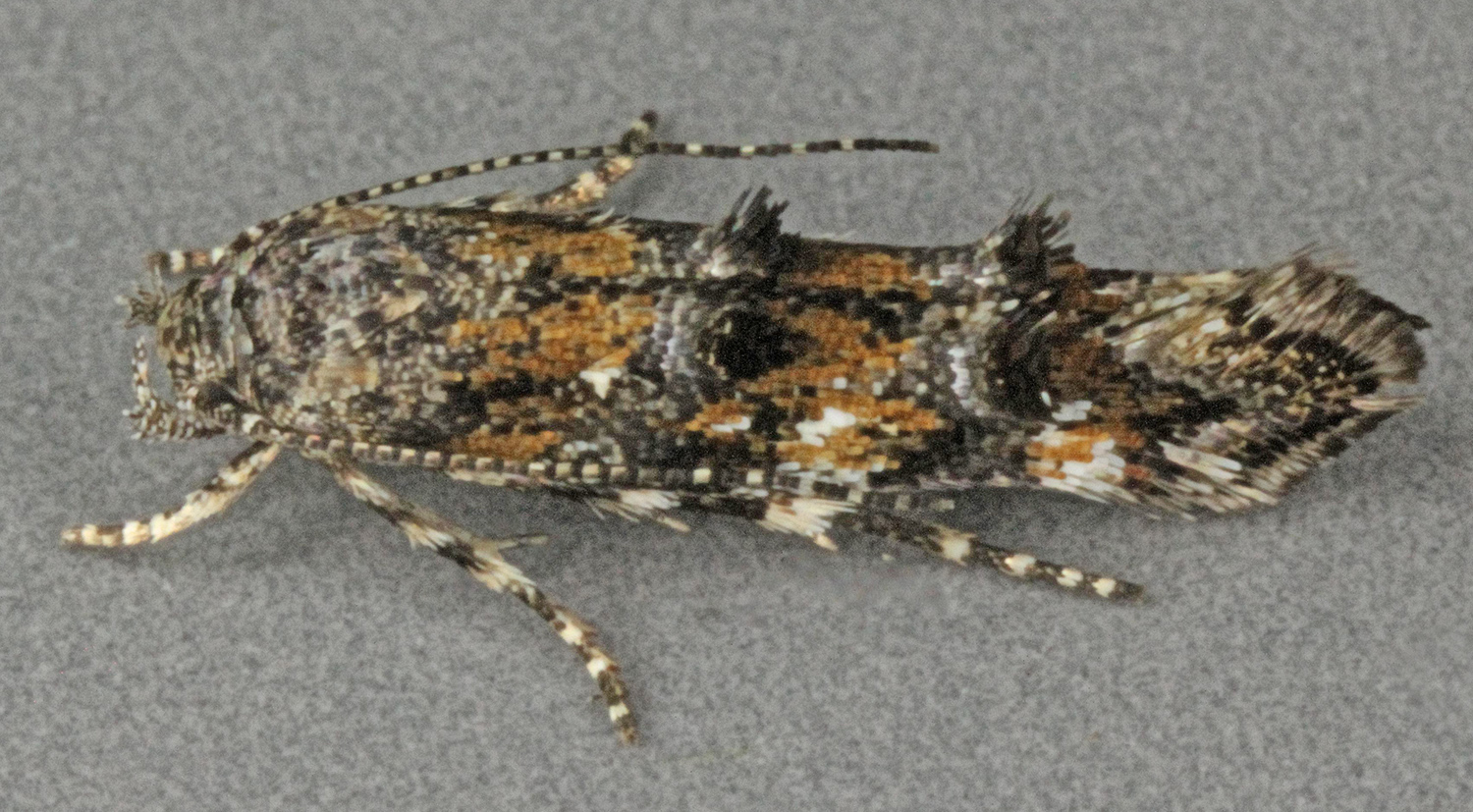

Scientific classification
- Domain: Eukaryota
- Kingdom: Animalia
- Phylum: Arthropoda
- Class: Insecta
- Order: Lepidoptera
- Family: Momphidae
- Genus: Mompha
- Species: M. miscella

Binomial name
- Mompha miscella (Denis & Schiffermüller, 1775)

Synonyms
- List: Tinea miscella Denis & Schiffermüller, 1775; Lophoptilus staintoni Sircom, 1848; Tebenna opacella Müller-Rutz, 1934

= Mompha miscella =

Species of moth

Mompha miscella is a moth in the family Momphidae, found in Asia Minor, Europe and North Africa.

== Description ==
The wingspan is 7–9 mm. There are two generations per year with adults on wing from the end of April to the beginning of October.

The larvae feed on rock rose (Cistus species), white rock-rose (Helianthemum apenninum), hoary rock-rose (Helianthemum oelandicum) and common rock-rose (Helianthemum nummularium), mining the leaves of their host plant. Larvae can be found from October to April and from June to July. Pupation takes place outside of the mine within a cocoon in soil litter.

== Distribution ==
Mompha miscella is found in most of Europe through to Asia Minor and North Africa. In the north, it is also found in the southern part of Fennoscandia.
