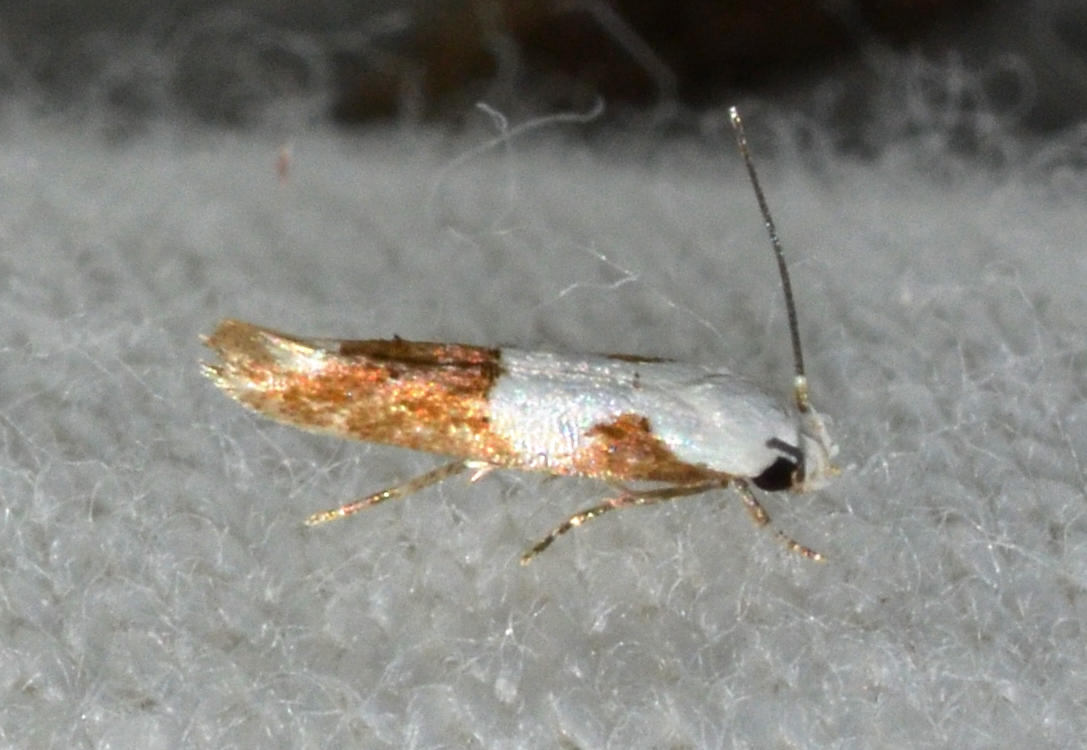

Scientific classification
- Kingdom: Animalia
- Phylum: Arthropoda
- Clade: Pancrustacea
- Class: Insecta
- Order: Lepidoptera
- Family: Momphidae
- Genus: Mompha
- Species: M. circumscriptella

Binomial name
- Mompha circumscriptella (Zeller, 1873)

Synonyms
- Laverna circumscriptella Zeller, 1873

= Mompha circumscriptella =

Species of moth

Mompha circumscriptella, the circumscript mompha moth, is a moth in the family Momphidae. It is found in North America, where it has been recorded from Alabama, Arkansas, British Columbia, California, Florida, Georgia, Illinois, Indiana, Iowa, Kansas, Kentucky, Louisiana, Maine, Maryland, Mississippi, Missouri, Nebraska, New Jersey, North Carolina, Ohio, Oklahoma, South Carolina, Tennessee, Texas and West Virginia.

The wingspan is about 12 millimetres (0.47 in).

The larvae feed on Oenothera species. They bore into the fruit of the host plant. Pupation takes place inside the fruit.
