= Bifascia nigralbella =

Scientific classification
- Kingdom: Animalia
- Phylum: Arthropoda
- Clade: Pancrustacea
- Class: Insecta
- Order: Lepidoptera
- Family: Momphidae
- Genus: Bifascia
- Species: B. nigralbella

Binomial name
- Bifascia nigralbella (Chretien, 1915)

Synonyms
- Ascalenia nigralbella Chretien, 1915; Limnoecia asteroleuca Meyrick, 1917

Species of moth

Bifascia nigralbella is a moth in the family Momphidae. It is found in Algeria, the northern Sahara, Tunisia, Saudi Arabia, western Pakistan and India. It has also been recorded from Spain.

The wingspan is 8-8.5 mm.

The larvae feed on the flowers of Acacia species, including Acacia farnesiana and Acacia horrida. They are 7 mm long and slender.
