= Mompha bradleyi =

Scientific classification
- Domain: Eukaryota
- Kingdom: Animalia
- Phylum: Arthropoda
- Class: Insecta
- Order: Lepidoptera
- Family: Momphidae
- Genus: Mompha
- Species: M. bradleyi

Binomial name
- Mompha bradleyi Riedl, 1965

Species of moth

Mompha bradleyi is a moth in the family Momphidae found in Europe.

== Description ==
The wingspan is 9–11 millimetres (0.35–0.43 in). Adults are on wing from mid-July to the end of May of the following year after overwintering. There is one generation per year.

The larvae feed on great willowherb (Epilobium hirsutum) feeding inside the stem of their host plant. Feeding causes a conspicuous red gall to be formed.

== Distribution ==
The moth is found in western and central Europe and has been recorded from Great Britain, France, the Netherlands, Germany, the Czech Republic, Austria, Hungary, Slovakia, Poland, Romania and Belarus.
