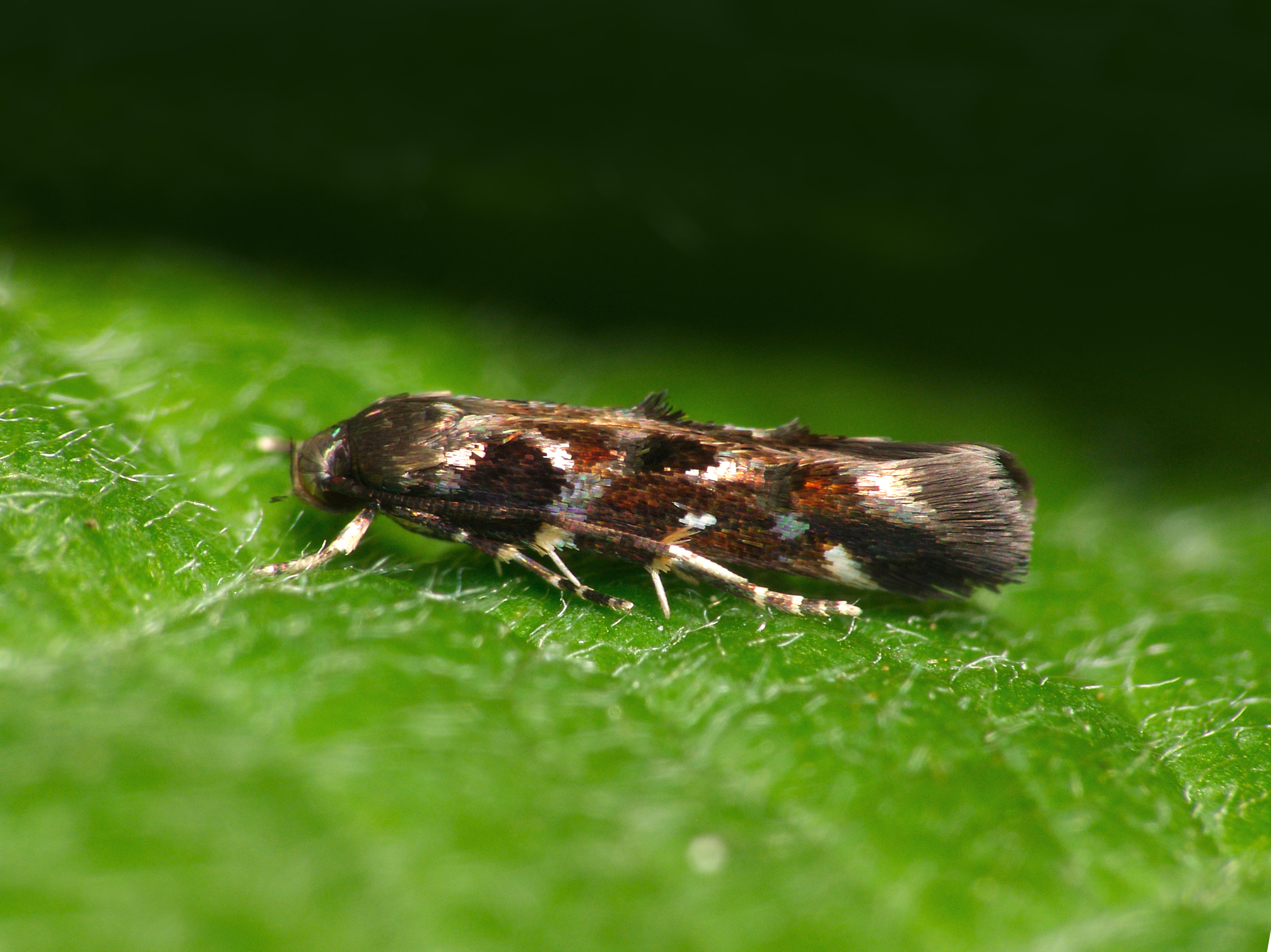

Scientific classification
- Kingdom: Animalia
- Phylum: Arthropoda
- Clade: Pancrustacea
- Class: Insecta
- Order: Lepidoptera
- Family: Momphidae
- Genus: Mompha
- Species: M. terminella

Binomial name
- Mompha terminella (Humphreys & Westwood, 1845)

Synonyms
- List: Glyphipteryx terminella Humphreys & Westwood, 1845; Psacaphora terminella; Psacaphora chrysargyrella Herrich-Schaffer, 1854; Mompha engelella Busck, 1906; Elachista patriciella Stainton, 1849

= Mompha terminella =

Species of moth

Mompha terminella is a moth in the family Momphidae found in Europe and North America.

== Description ==
The wingspan is 8–10 mm.The head is dark leaden-metallic, the face silvery. Antennae with apex white. The forewings are orange, sometimes suffused with purple or brown; a black blotch on base of costa, margined with silver-metallic spots; stigmata and a spot above tornus silver-metallic, black-edged, first discal whiter; apex black, preceded on costa by a white spot and on termen by a silver-metallic mark. The hindwings are dark fuscous.The larva is whitish; dorsal line green; head yellowish brown: in irregular (at first spiral) blotches in leaves of Circaea lutetiana; The imago is seldom observed at large. Note- forewing ground colour is dark orange. There is lead-coloured spot extending from the base of the wing to 1/3 of the length of the forewing, at the base of the wing it extends from the costal vein to the inner edge of the wing. Adults are on wing from July to August in one generation per year.

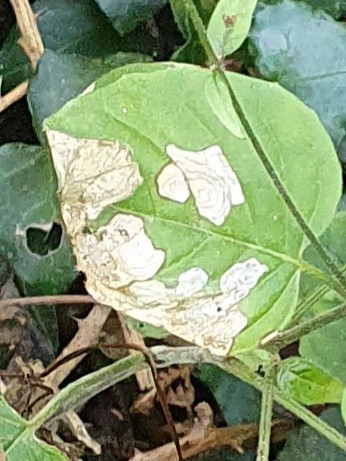

The larvae feed on small enchanter's nightshade (Circaea alpina) and enchanter's nightshade (Circaea lutetiana) mining the leaves of their host plant. Larvae can be found from mid-August to mid-September. They are whitish with a light brown head.

== Distribution ==
It is found from Fennoscandia to the Iberian Peninsula and from Ireland to Romania. It is also found in North America.
