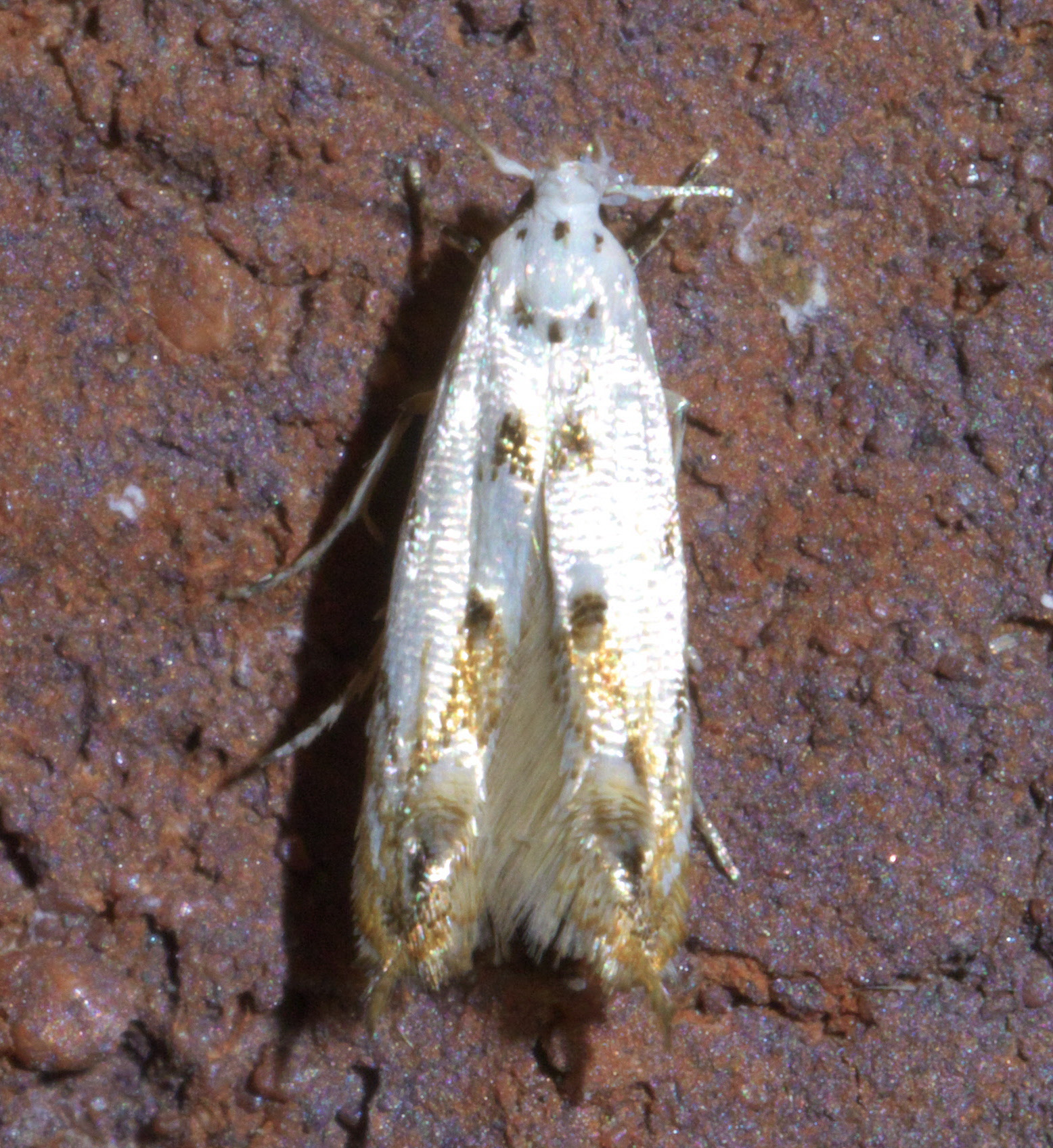

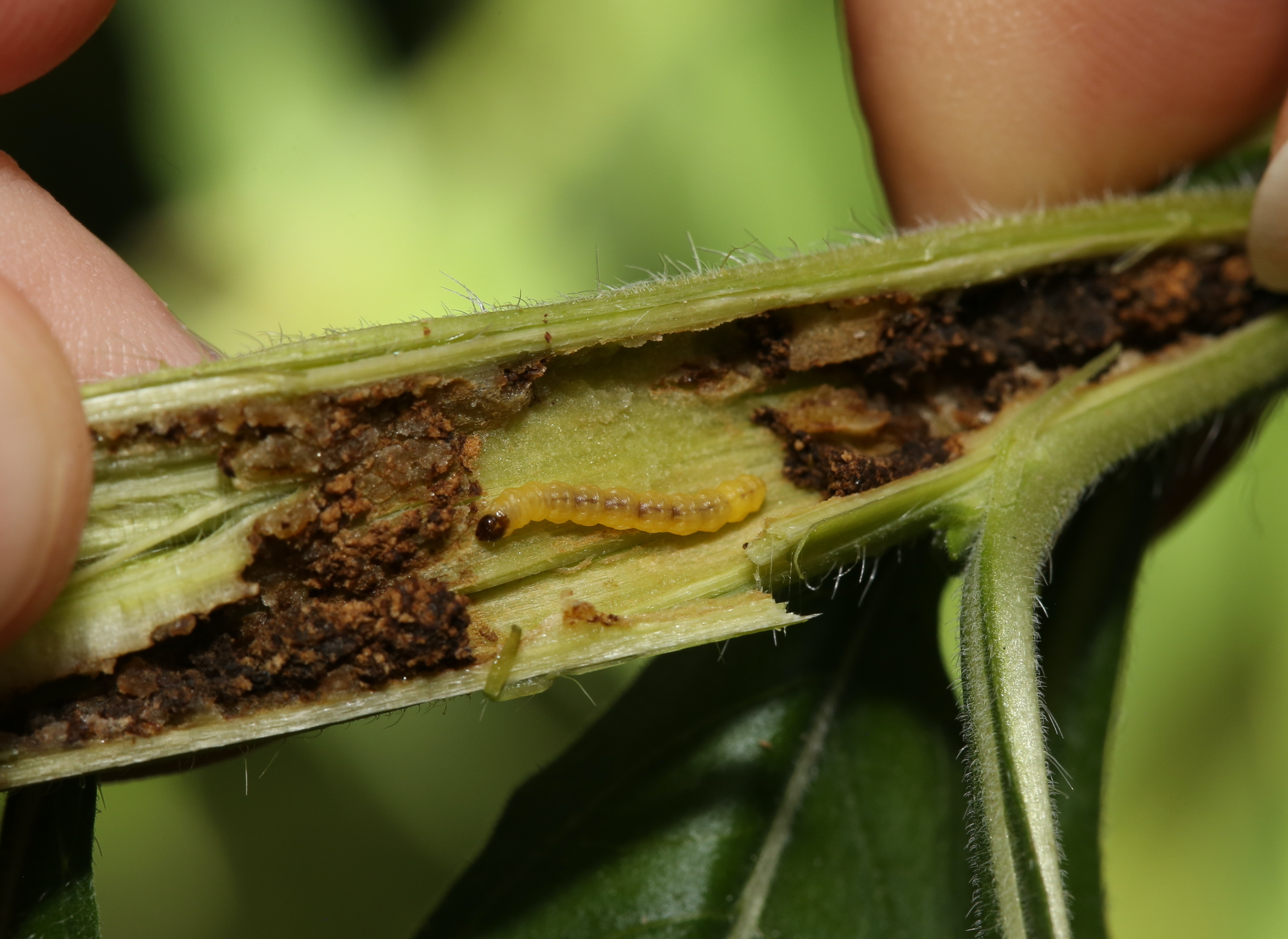
- Larva boring in Oenothera biennis

Scientific classification
- Kingdom: Animalia
- Phylum: Arthropoda
- Clade: Pancrustacea
- Class: Insecta
- Order: Lepidoptera
- Family: Momphidae
- Genus: Mompha
- Species: M. eloisella

Binomial name
- Mompha eloisella Clemens, 1860

= Mompha eloisella =

Species of moth

Mompha eloisella, the red-streaked mompha, is a species of momphid moth in the family Momphidae.
