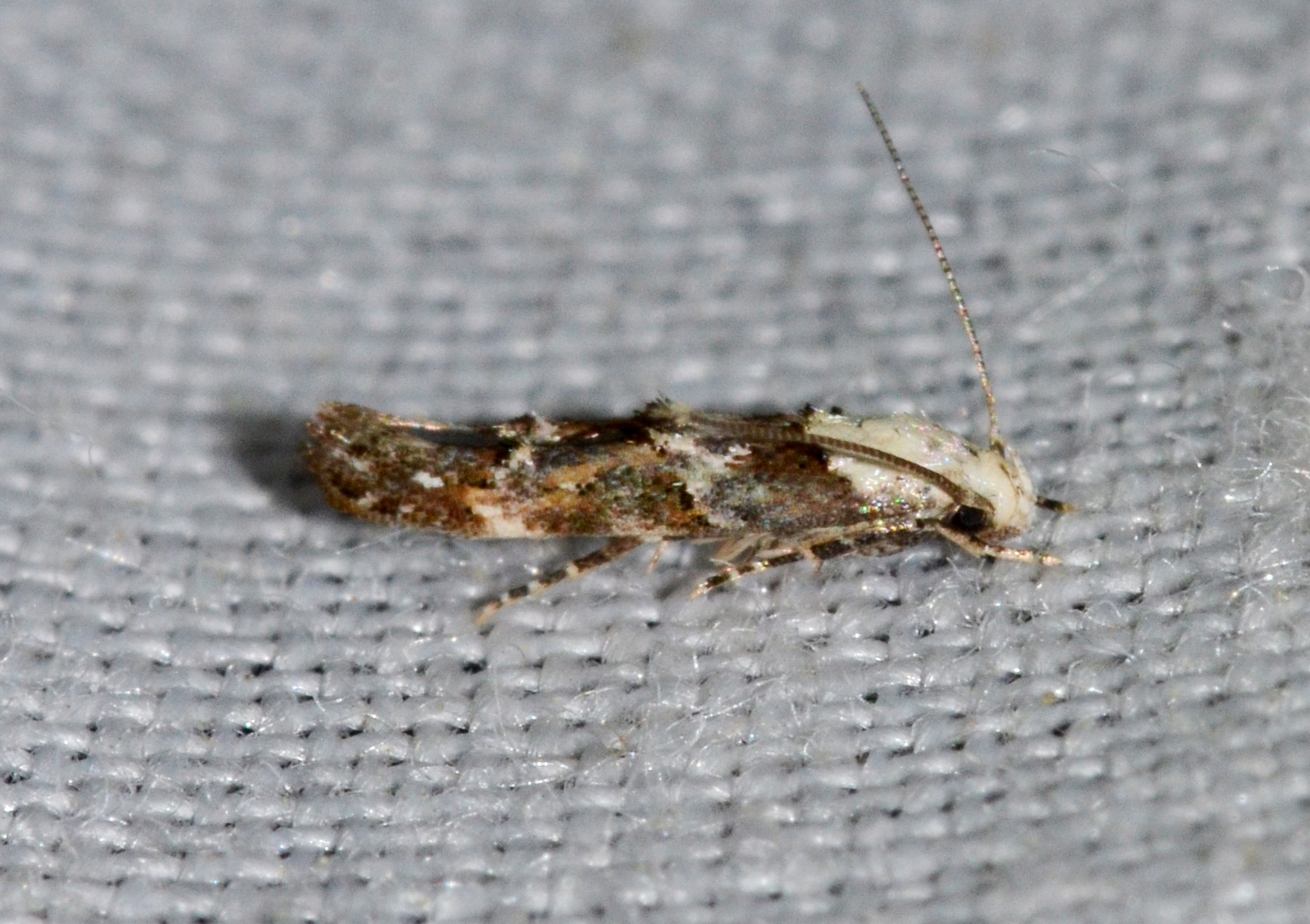

Scientific classification
- Kingdom: Animalia
- Phylum: Arthropoda
- Clade: Pancrustacea
- Class: Insecta
- Order: Lepidoptera
- Family: Momphidae
- Genus: Mompha
- Species: M. murtfeldtella

Binomial name
- Mompha murtfeldtella (Chambers, 1875)

Synonyms
- Laverna murtfeldtella Chambers, 1875; Laverna albocapitella Chambers, 1875; Laverna grissella Chambers, 1875; Laverna obscurusella Chambers, 1875; Laverna parvicristatella Chambers, 1875

= Mompha murtfeldtella =

Species of moth

Mompha murtfeldtella is a moth in the family Momphidae. It is found in North America, where it has been recorded from Alabama, California, Florida, Illinois, Indiana, Kansas, Kentucky, Maine, Maryland, Minnesota, Mississippi, North Carolina, Ohio, Oklahoma, Tennessee, Texas and Wisconsin.

The wingspan is about 10 millimetres (0.39 in).

The larvae feed on the reproductive tissue of Oenothera species.
