= Mompha confusella =

Scientific classification
- Kingdom: Animalia
- Phylum: Arthropoda
- Clade: Pancrustacea
- Class: Insecta
- Order: Lepidoptera
- Family: Momphidae
- Genus: Mompha
- Species: M. confusella

Binomial name
- Mompha confusella Koster & Sinev, 1996

Species of moth

Mompha confusella is a moth in the family Momphidae. It found from central and southern Europe to Transcaucasia. In Europe, it has been recorded from the Czech Republic, Austria, Hungary, Slovakia, Ukraine and Russia.

The wingspan is 11–13 millimetres (0.43–0.51 in). Adults are on wing from mid July to the end of May of the following year after overwintering. There is one generation per year.

The larvae feed on Epilobium hirsutum and Chamaenerion angustifolium.
