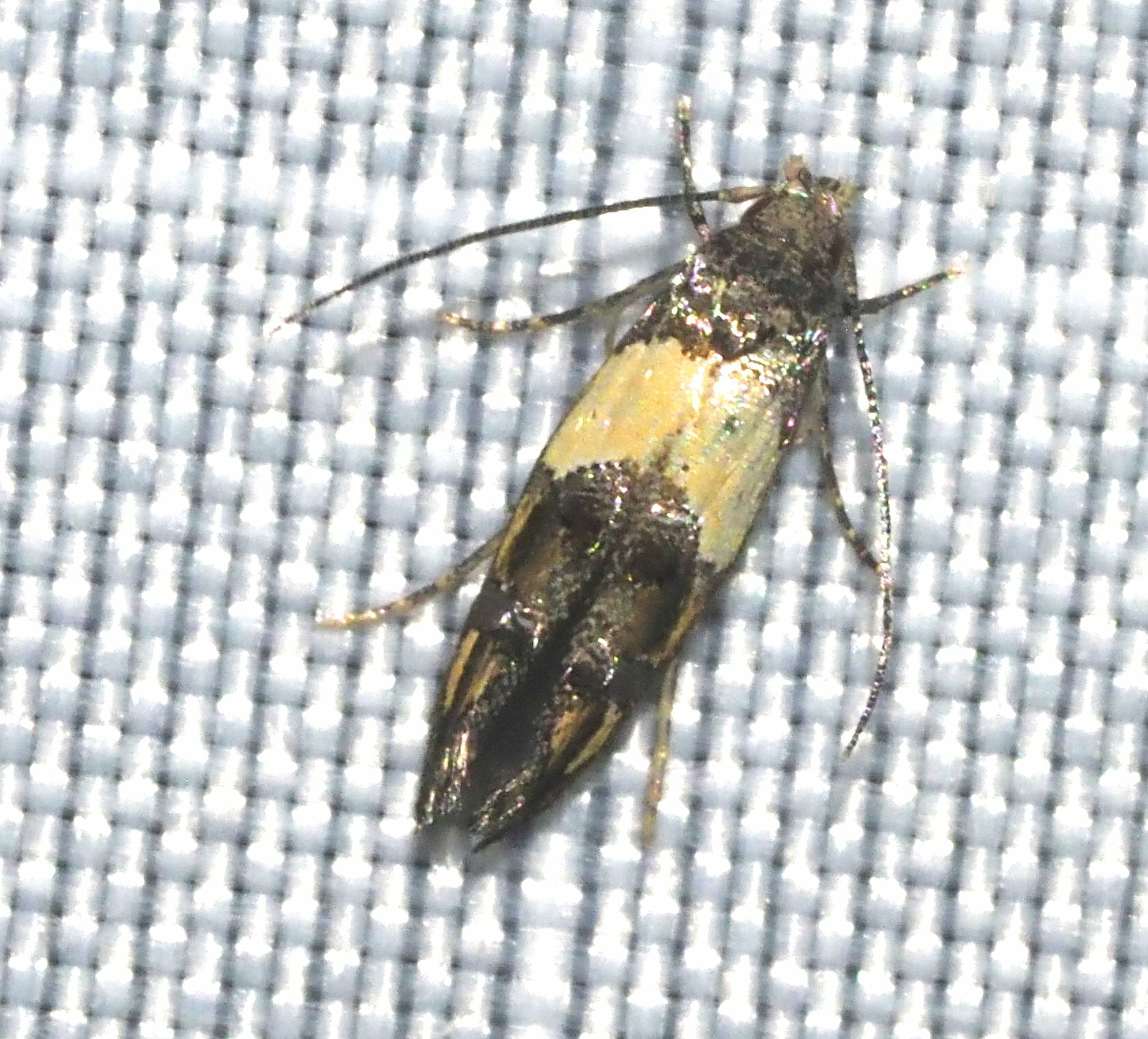

Scientific classification
- Kingdom: Animalia
- Phylum: Arthropoda
- Class: Insecta
- Order: Lepidoptera
- Family: Momphidae
- Genus: Mompha
- Species: M. trithalama

Binomial name
- Mompha trithalama Meyrick, 1927

= Mompha trithalama =

Species of moth

Mompha trithalama is a moth of the family Momphidae. It is native to Brazil, Peru and Trinidad, but was introduced to Hawaii for biological control of Clidemia hirta.

The larvae feed on Melastomataceae species, including Clidemia hirta.
