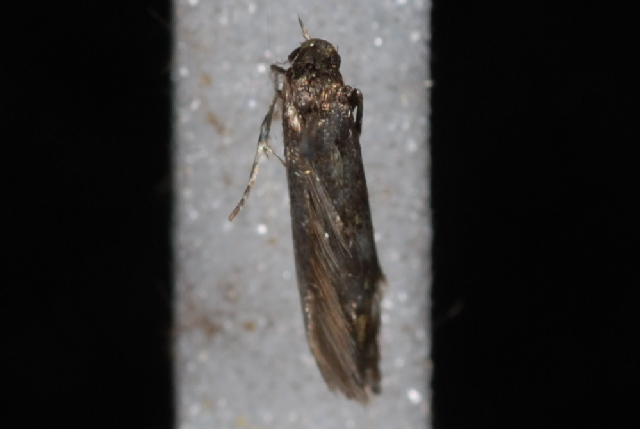

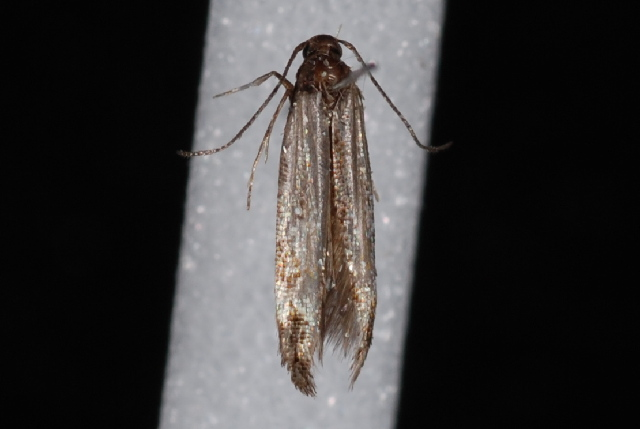

Scientific classification
- Domain: Eukaryota
- Kingdom: Animalia
- Phylum: Arthropoda
- Class: Insecta
- Order: Lepidoptera
- Family: Momphidae
- Genus: Mompha
- Species: M. sexstrigella

Binomial name
- Mompha sexstrigella (Braun, 1921)

Synonyms
- Psacaphora sexstrigella Braun, 1921; Mompha complexa Svensson, 1982

= Mompha sexstrigella =

Species of moth

Mompha sexstrigella is a moth in the family Momphidae. It has a Holarctic distribution. In Europe it is found in northern Fennoscandia and Estonia. It is also found in the Asian part of Russia, where it is known from the Altai mountains, southern Siberia and Sakhalin. In North America, it is found in Canada and the western United States.

The wingspan is 10–11 mm. There is one generation per year with adults on wing from the second half of June to the middle of August.

The larvae feed on Chamaenerion angustifolium. They mine the leaves of their host plant. Larvae can be found from July to August.
