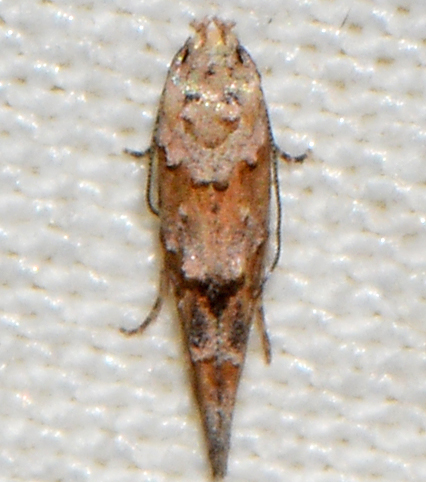

Scientific classification
- Kingdom: Animalia
- Phylum: Arthropoda
- Clade: Pancrustacea
- Class: Insecta
- Order: Lepidoptera
- Family: Momphidae
- Genus: Mompha
- Species: M. stellella

Binomial name
- Mompha stellella Busck, 1906

= Mompha stellella =

Species of moth

Mompha stellella is a species of momphid moth in the family Momphidae.
