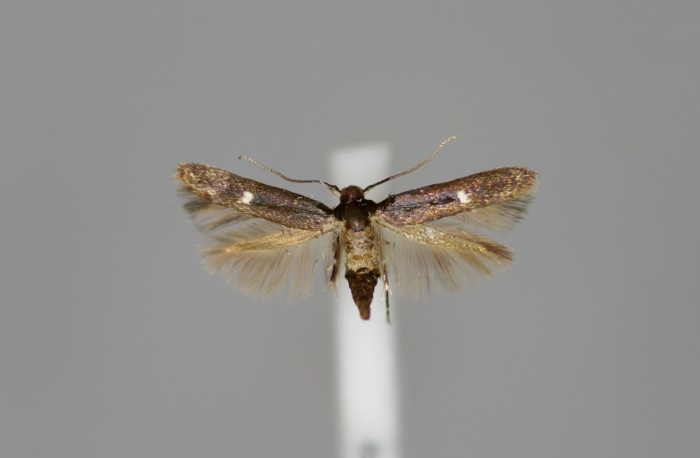

Scientific classification
- Kingdom: Animalia
- Phylum: Arthropoda
- Clade: Pancrustacea
- Class: Insecta
- Order: Lepidoptera
- Family: Momphidae
- Genus: Mompha
- Species: M. langiella

Binomial name
- Mompha langiella (Hübner, 1796)

Synonyms
- List: Tinea langiella Hübner, 1796; Alucita epilobiella Romer, 1794; Mompha fulicella Herrich-Schaffer, 1854; Elachista niveipunctella Stainton, 1849; Adela unipunctella Duponchel, in Godart, 1839; Psacaphora quadrilobella Herrich-Schäffer, [1854]

= Mompha langiella =

Species of moth

Mompha langiella is a moth of the family Momphidae. It is found in most of Europe, except parts of the Balkan Peninsula and the Mediterranean islands.

== Description ==
The wingspan is 10–11 millimetres (0.39–0.43 in). The head is dark brown and shows a slight purple sheen. The frons is white. The antennae are dark brown in the first third, grey and dark brown ringed in the middle third and grey in the last third. The thorax and forewings are brownish black and have a purple sheen. An irregular white spot is located outside the centre of the wings, sometimes some white scales are also present at 1/3 of the forewings length on the fold. The costa is sparsely speckled with white scales in the outer half of the wings and at the apex. The hind wings are grey-brown. The abdomen is brownish black. The tuft is grey in males and white in females.

In males, the uncus is slender and has a rounded tip. The cucullus is slender, subapical the widest and has a blunt apex. The sacculus is longer than the cucullus and tapers into a sharp, slightly curved tip. The gnathos is wide and only slightly sclerotized. The anellus lobes are small and rounded. The aedeagus is slender and has a fairly large cornutus. This is wide at the base and slim and curved at the apex.

In females, the ostium is very wide and cup-shaped. The posterior third of the bursae duct is wide, weakly sclerotized and provided with two short strongly sclerotized edges. The front part tapers and is provided with large sclerites. The seminal duct starts at about 1/3 of the length of the bursae duct. The corpus bursae is oval and tapers slightly to the rear. It has two large crescent-shaped signa.
