= Mompha canicinctella =

Scientific classification
- Kingdom: Animalia
- Phylum: Arthropoda
- Clade: Pancrustacea
- Class: Insecta
- Order: Lepidoptera
- Family: Momphidae
- Genus: Mompha
- Species: M. canicinctella

Binomial name
- Mompha canicinctella (Clemens, 1863)

Synonyms
- Chauliodus canicinctella Clemens, 1863

Species of moth

Mompha canicinctella is a moth in the family Momphidae. It was described by James Brackenridge Clemens in 1863. It is found in the United States.

The wingspan is about 14 mm. The forewings are dirty whitish towards the base and the apical half is fuscous varied with blackish. There is an irregular whitish band near the tip, inclined towards the base and margined externally with a short black line from the inner margin, and with two short exterior black dashes, one on the middle of the wing and one on the costa. The hindwings are fuscous.
