= Mompha meridionella =

Scientific classification
- Kingdom: Animalia
- Phylum: Arthropoda
- Clade: Pancrustacea
- Class: Insecta
- Order: Lepidoptera
- Family: Momphidae
- Genus: Mompha
- Species: M. meridionella

Binomial name
- Mompha meridionella Koster & Sinev, 2003

Species of moth

Mompha meridionella is a moth in the family Momphidae that can be found in the northern Caucasus and Greece.

The wingspan is 11–12 millimetres (0.43–0.47 in). Adults are on wing at the end of May in the Caucasus and the end of July in Greece.

The larvae probably feed on Epilobium species.
