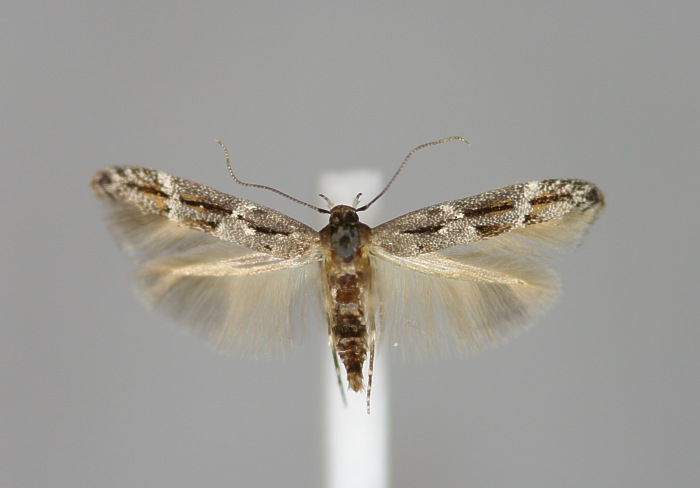

Scientific classification
- Kingdom: Animalia
- Phylum: Arthropoda
- Clade: Pancrustacea
- Class: Insecta
- Order: Lepidoptera
- Family: Momphidae
- Genus: Mompha
- Species: M. sturnipennella

Binomial name
- Mompha sturnipennella (Treitschke, 1833)

Synonyms
- List: Ornix sturnipennella Treitschke, 1833; Oecophora modestella Eversmann, 1844; [Mompha] permutatella Herrich-Schäffer, [1854]; Mompha (Lauerna) nodicolella Fuchs, 1902

= Mompha sturnipennella =

Species of moth

Mompha sturnipennella is a moth in the family Momphidae. It is found in the Holarctic ecozone and is found in most of Europe (except the south), Siberia, the Russian Far East and Canada.

== Description ==
The wingspan is 13–18 mm. Adults are on wing from July to August and again from September to May of the following year after hibernation.

The larvae feed on rosebay willowherb (Chamaenerion angustifolium). The larvae feed inside the stem of their host plant, usually in the flowering part. Feeding causes a gall to be formed. Larvae of the second generation usually live in a seedpod. Larvae of the first generation are found from May to June and larvae of the second generation are found from July to August.
