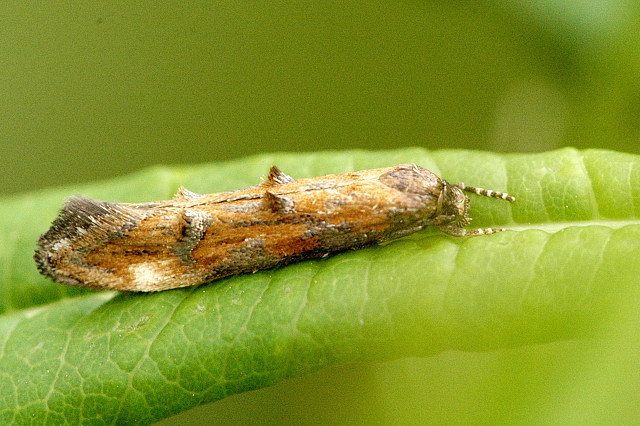

Scientific classification
- Domain: Eukaryota
- Kingdom: Animalia
- Phylum: Arthropoda
- Class: Insecta
- Order: Lepidoptera
- Family: Momphidae
- Genus: Mompha
- Species: M. idaei

Binomial name
- Mompha idaei (Zeller, 1839)

Synonyms
- Elachista idaei Zeller, 1839; Mompha tricristatella (Chambers, 1875); Butalis idaeella Duponchel, in Godart, [1843]; Laverna grandisella Chambers, 1875; Leucophryne tricristatella Chambers, 1875; Laverna subiridescens Walsingham, 1882; Cyphophora polaris Sinev, 1986

= Mompha idaei =

Species of moth

Mompha idaei is a moth in the family Momphidae first described by Philipp Christoph Zeller in 1839. It has a Holarctic distribution; in North America it is found from coast to coast in the boreal forest south to Colorado and Washington.

The wingspan is 18–22 mm. Adults are on wing in May to July. The larvae live in the roots of Epilobium angustifolium and Epilobium latifolium.
