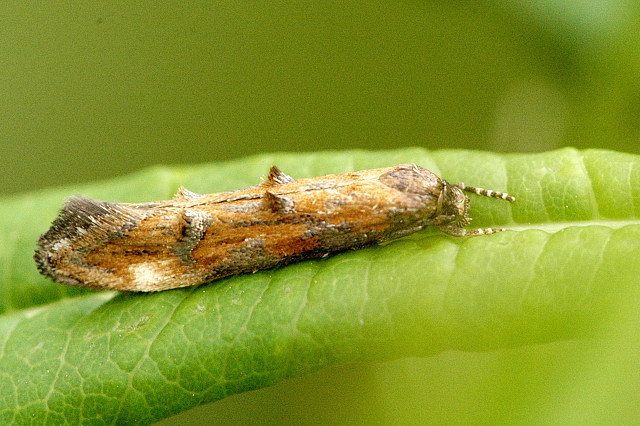
- Mompha idaei

Scientific classification
- Domain: Eukaryota
- Kingdom: Animalia
- Phylum: Arthropoda
- Class: Insecta
- Order: Lepidoptera
- Family: Momphidae
- Subfamily: Momphinae
- Genus: Mompha; Hübner, 1825

Type species
- Tinea conturbatella Hübner, 1819

Synonyms
- Lauerna Curtis, 1839; Wilsonia Clemens, 1864; Leucophryne Chambers, 1875

= Mompha =

Genus of moth

Mompha is a genus of moths in the family Momphidae that was first described by Jacob Hübner in 1819. It has four subgenera.

== Subgenus Anybia ==
The genus Anybia was described by Henry Tibbats Stainton in 1854 and was later demoted to a subgenus. The type species is Tinea langiella Hübner, 1796 (= Alucita epilobiella Römer, 1794).

== Subgenus Cyphophora ==
The biggest species of the genus are found in this subgenus. The genus Cyphophora was described by Gottlieb August Wilhelm Herrich-Schäffer in 1853 and was later demoted to a subgenus. The type species is Elachista idaei Zeller, 1839.

== Subgenus Lophoptilus ==
The genus Lophoptilus was described by John Sircom in 1848 and was later demoted to a subgenus. The type species is Lophoptilus staintoni Sircom, 1848 (= Tinea miscella [Denis & Schiffermüller], 1775).

== Subgenus Psacaphora ==
The genus Psacaphora was described by Herrich-Schäffer in 1853 and was later demoted to a subgenus. The type species is Tinea schrankella Hübner, 1805 (= Tinea locupletella Denis & Schiffermüller, 1775).

== Species ==
- Mompha achlyognoma Koster & Harrison, 1997
- Mompha albapalpella (Chambers, 1875)
- Mompha albella (Chambers, 1875)
- Mompha annulata (Braun, 1923)
- Mompha argentimaculella (Murtfeldt, 1900)
- Mompha bicristatella (Chambers, 1879)
- Mompha bifasciella (Chambers, 1876)
- Mompha bottimeri Busck, 1940 - Bottimer's mompha moth
- Mompha bradleyi Riedl, 1965
- Mompha brevivittella (Clemens, 1864)
- Mompha canicinctella (Clemens, 1863)
- Mompha capella Busck, 1940
- Mompha cephalonthiella (Chambers, 1871) - buttonbush leafminer moth
- Mompha circumscriptella (Zeller, 1873) - circumscript mompha moth
- Mompha claudiella Kearfott, 1907
- Mompha cleidarotrypa Koster & Harrison, 1997
- Mompha coloradella (Chambers, 1877)
- Mompha communis (Braun, 1925)
- Mompha confusella Koster & Sinev, 1996
- Mompha conturbatella (Hübner, 1819) - fireweed mompha moth
- Mompha deceptella (Braun, 1921)
- Mompha definitella (Zeller, 1873)
- Mompha difficilis (Braun, 1923)
- Mompha divisella Herrich-Schäffer, 1854
- Mompha edithella (Barnes & Busck, 1920)
- Mompha eloisella (Clemens, 1860) - red-streaked mompha moth
- Mompha epilobiella (Denis & Schiffermüller, 1775)
- Mompha falclandica Wakeham-Dawson & Koster, 2013
- Mompha franclemonti Hodges, 1992
- Mompha glaucella Sinev, 1986
- Mompha idaei (Zeller, 1839)
- Mompha ignotilisella (Chambers, 1875)
- Mompha jurassicella (Frey, 1881)
- Mompha lacteella (Stephens, 1834)
- Mompha langiella (Hübner, 1796)
- Mompha locupletella (Denis & Schiffermüller, 1775)
- Mompha luciferella (Clemens, 1860)
- Mompha meridionella Koster & Sinev, 2003
- Mompha metallifera (Walsingham, 1882)
- Mompha millotella Viette, 1955
- Mompha minimella (Chambers, 1880)
- Mompha miscella (Denis & Schiffermüller, 1775)
- Mompha murtfeldtella (Chambers, 1875)
- Mompha nancyae Clarke, 1990
- Mompha nuptialis Meyrick, 1922
- Mompha ochraceella (Curtis, 1839)
- Mompha passerella (Busck, 1909)
- Mompha pecosella Busck, 1907
- Mompha powelli (Busck, 1909)
- Mompha propinquella (Stainton, 1851)
- Mompha purpuriella (Busck, 1909)
- Mompha raschkiella (Zeller, 1839)
- Mompha rufocristatella (Chambers, 1875)
- Mompha sexstrigella (Braun, 1921)
- Mompha solomoni D.L. Wagner, Adamski & R.L. Brown, 2004
- Mompha stellella Busck, 1906
- Mompha sturnipennella (Treitschke, 1833)
- Mompha subbistrigella (Haworth, 1828)
- Mompha terminella (Humphreys & Westwood, 1845)
- Mompha trithalama Meyrick, 1927
- Mompha unifasciella (Chambers, 1876)
