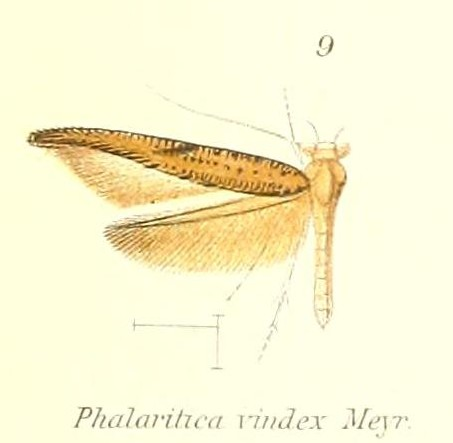

Scientific classification
- Kingdom: Animalia
- Phylum: Arthropoda
- Class: Insecta
- Order: Lepidoptera
- Family: Momphidae
- Genus: Phalaritica; Meyrick, 1913
- Species: P. vindex

Binomial name
- Phalaritica vindex Meyrick, 1913

= Phalaritica =

Genus of moths

Phalaritica is a genus of moths in the family Momphidae. There is only one species in this genus: Phalaritica vindex Meyrick, 1913 that is found in Sri Lanka.
