= Bifascia =

Scientific classification
- Kingdom: Animalia
- Phylum: Arthropoda
- Clade: Pancrustacea
- Class: Insecta
- Order: Lepidoptera
- Family: Momphidae
- Genus: Bifascia; Amsel, 1961

Genus of moths

Bifascia is a genus of moths in the family Momphidae.

Species:

- Bifascia nigralbella (Chrétien, 1915)
- Bifascia yemenella Amsel, 1961
