= Gracilosia =

Scientific classification
- Kingdom: Animalia
- Phylum: Arthropoda
- Clade: Pancrustacea
- Class: Insecta
- Order: Lepidoptera
- Family: Momphidae
- Genus: Gracilosia; Sinev, 1989
- Species: G. ochreopennella

Binomial name
- Gracilosia ochreopennella Sinev, 1989

Genus of moths

Gracilosia is a genus of moths of the family Momphidae, or alternatively, Cosmopterigidae. It contains only one species, Gracilosia ochreopennella, which is found in Tajikistan.
