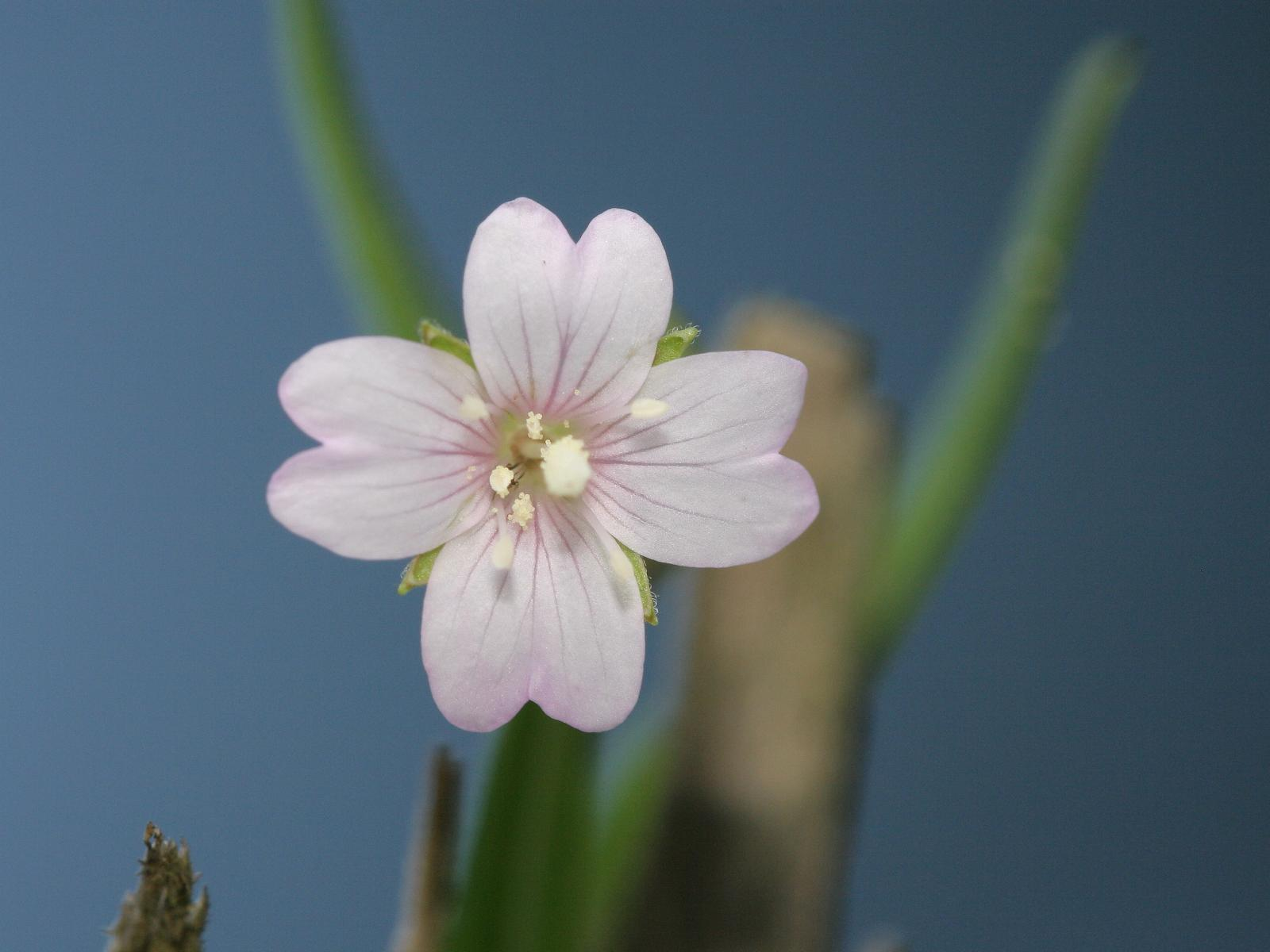

Scientific classification
- Kingdom: Plantae
- Clade: Embryophytes
- Clade: Tracheophytes
- Clade: Spermatophytes
- Clade: Angiosperms
- Clade: Eudicots
- Clade: Rosids
- Order: Myrtales
- Family: Onagraceae
- Genus: Epilobium
- Species: E. palustre

Binomial name
- Epilobium palustre L.

Synonyms
- Epilobium lineare Epilobium oliganthum Epilobium pylaieanum Epilobium wyomingense

= Epilobium palustre =

Species of flowering plant

Epilobium palustre is a species of willowherb known by the common name marsh willowherb. This plant has a circumboreal distribution, and can be found further south in mountainous areas.

== Description ==
This is a hairy perennial growing spindly stems sometimes exceeding half a meter in height. Its stems have spaced oval to linear leaves two to seven centimeters long. The stems are tipped with hairy inflorescences of small white or pink flowers. The stigma is club-shaped rather than 4-lobed. Each flower has four petals which may be quite minute to almost a centimeter long and notched to form two lobes. The fruit is a hairy capsule 3 to 9 centimeters long.

Plants from different habitats exhibit high morphological diversity.

== Distribution ==
Locally common in the British Isles. Its distribution in Croatia is scattered, expected in all regions far enough from the coast but dependent on endangered wetland habitats.

== Bibliography ==
- Strgulc Krajšek, Simona; Šegedin, Tamara; Jogan, Nejc (2009-06-30). "Revision of Epilobium and Chamerion in the Croatian herbaria ZA and ZAHO". Natura Croatica. 18 (1): 155–167. eISSN 1848-7386.
