= Blue-gray =

Color

Livid (Blue-gray)

Color coordinates
- Hex triplet: #6699CC
- sRGB^{B} (r, g, b): (102, 153, 204)
- HSV (h, s, v): (210°, 50%, 80%)
- CIELCh_{uv} (L, C, h): (62, 54, 244°)
- Source: Maerz and Paul (Crayola)
- ISCC–NBS descriptor: Light blue
- B: Normalized to [0–255] (byte)

Blue-gray (also blue-grey in British English) is a medium blue-gray color on the cool side of the color wheel. The name blue-gray was introduced by Crayola for a crayon color used from 1958 to 1990. The complementary color is #CC9966, a warm khaki or brown.

It has historically been called livid, from the Latin lividus, meaning "a dull leaden-blue color". The word entered English in the fifteenth century, first in medical use to describe the bluish-gray discoloration of bruised or damaged flesh, the condition also expressed in the phrase "black and blue". The familiar modern sense of livid meaning furiously angry developed later, via the intermediate sense of a face turning pale or ashen with rage.

There is a wide range of named blue-gray or livid shades, including steel blue, glaucous, cadet grey, and Payne's grey, among others. The color appears in nature, culture, and military uniform traditions around the world.

== Variations of blue-gray ==
The colors below are arranged according to value (brightness, the V code in HSV), lightest at the top and darkest towards the bottom.

=== Lavender gray ===
Lavender gray

Color coordinates
- Hex triplet: #C4C3D0
- sRGB^{B} (r, g, b): (196, 195, 208)
- HSV (h, s, v): (245°, 6%, 82%)
- CIELCh_{uv} (L, C, h): (79, 10, 269°)
- Source: ISCC-NBS
- ISCC–NBS descriptor: Light bluish-gray
- B: Normalized to [0–255] (byte)

The historical name for this color is lavender gray. It is listed in A Dictionary of Color as one of the three major variations of lavender in 1930 along with lavender blue (shown below) and [floral] lavender (also shown below). (This book also designates a fourth shade of lavender, called old lavender, also shown below). This color is similar to Prismacolor colored pencil PC 1026, Greyed Lavender.

=== Iceberg ===
Iceberg

Color coordinates
- Hex triplet: #71A6D2
- sRGB^{B} (r, g, b): (113, 166, 210)
- HSV (h, s, v): (207°, 46%, 82%)
- CIELCh_{uv} (L, C, h): (66, 50, 239°)
- Source: Maerz and Paul
- ISCC–NBS descriptor: Light blue
- B: Normalized to [0–255] (byte)

The color iceberg is displayed at right.

The first recorded use of iceberg as a color name in English was in 1921.

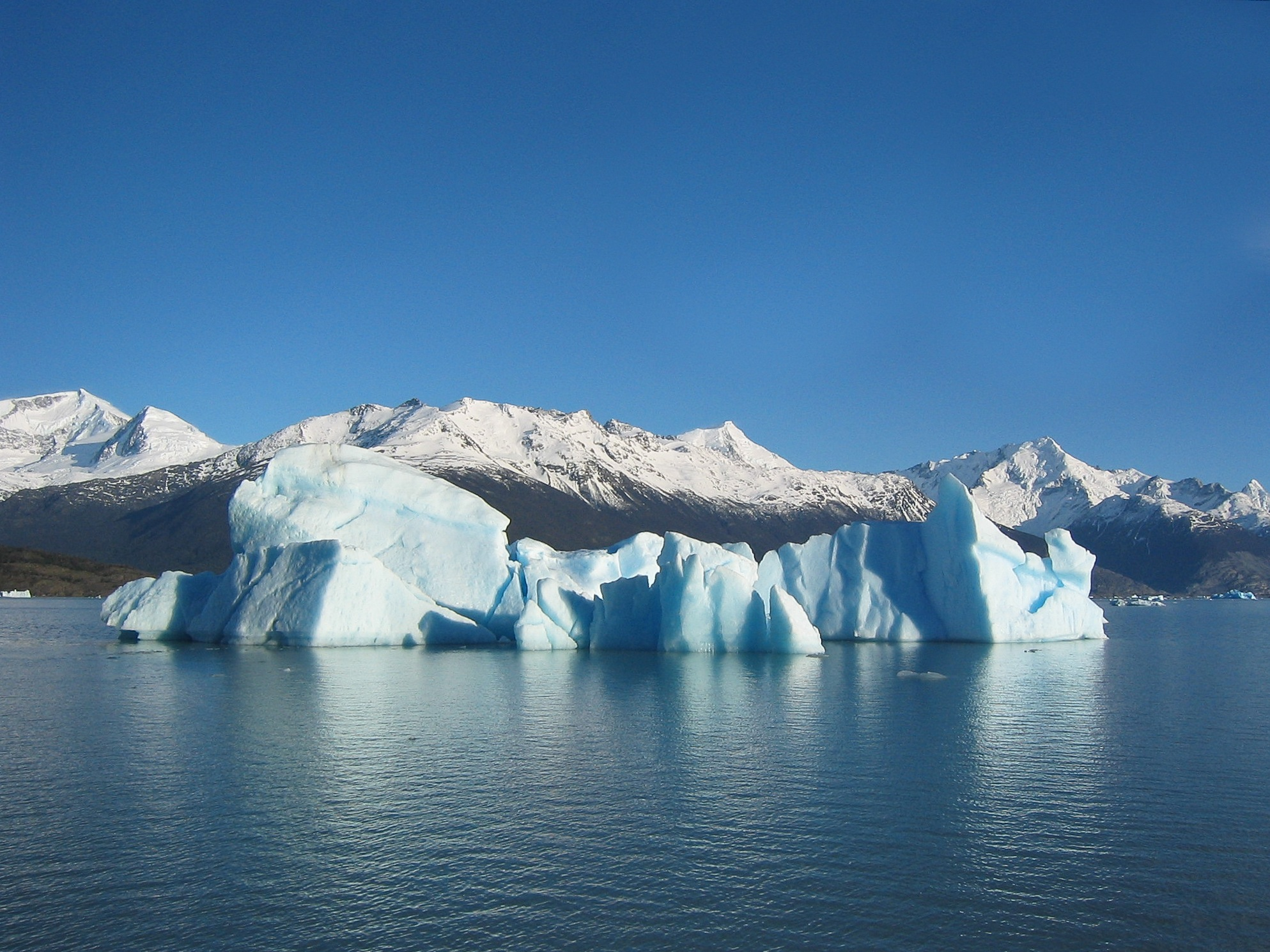
An iceberg in Argentina

=== Slate blue ===
Slate blue

Color coordinates
- Hex triplet: #6A5ACD
- sRGB^{B} (r, g, b): (106, 90, 205)
- HSV (h, s, v): (248°, 56%, 80%)
- CIELCh_{uv} (L, C, h): (45, 90, 269°)
- Source: X11
- ISCC–NBS descriptor: Vivid purplish blue
- B: Normalized to [0–255] (byte)

Displayed at right is the web color slate blue.

The first recorded use of slate blue as a color name in English was in 1796.

=== Blue bell ===
Blue bell

Color coordinates
- Hex triplet: #A2A2D0
- sRGB^{B} (r, g, b): (162, 162, 208)
- HSV (h, s, v): (240°, 22%, 82%)
- CIELCh_{uv} (L, C, h): (68, 38, 266°)
- Source: Crayola
- ISCC–NBS descriptor: Light purplish blue
- B: Normalized to [0–255] (byte)

Blue bell is a shade of blue-gray. It is also a Crayola color. It represents the bluebell flower.

The first recorded use of bluebell as a color name in English was in 1920.

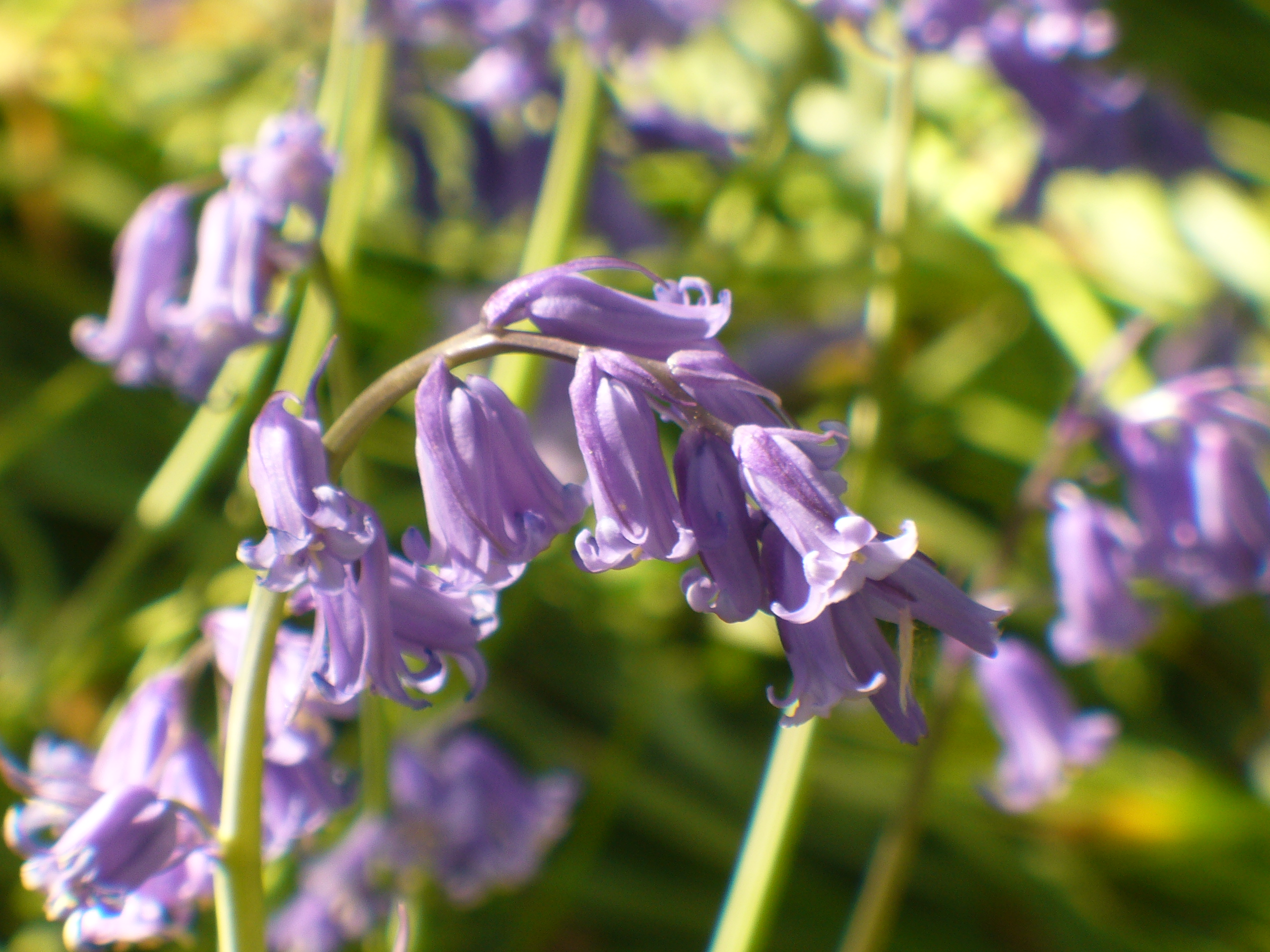
Bluebell flowers

=== Glaucous ===
Glaucous

Color coordinates
- Hex triplet: #6082B6
- sRGB^{B} (r, g, b): (96, 130, 182)
- HSV (h, s, v): (216°, 47%, 71%)
- CIELCh_{uv} (L, C, h): (54, 51, 250°)
- Source: ISCC-NBS
- ISCC–NBS descriptor: Moderate blue
- B: Normalized to [0–255] (byte)

Glaucous is a shade of blue-gray found on the surfaces of some plants and animals.

The first recorded use of glaucous as a color name in English was in the year 1671.

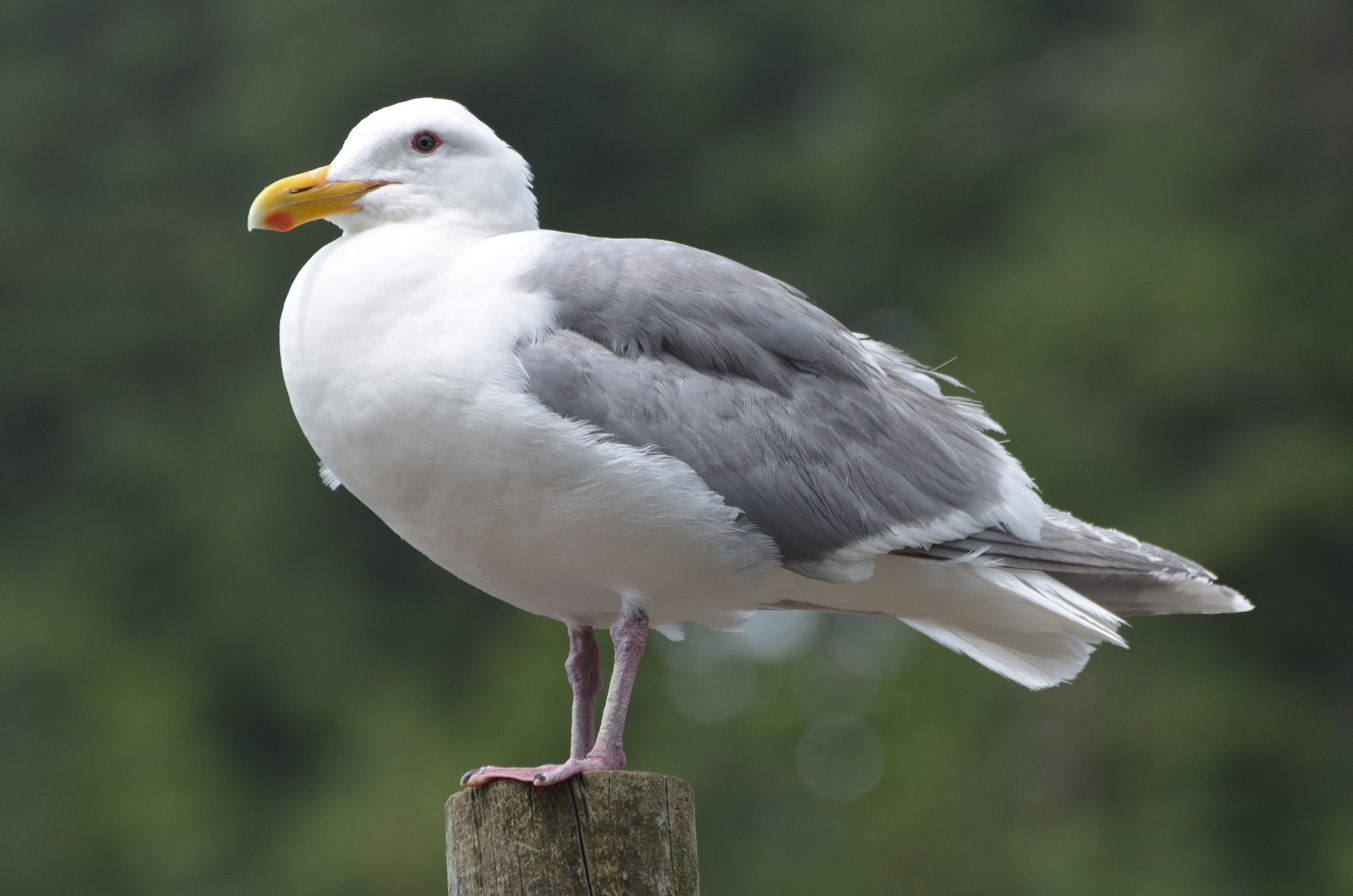
A glaucous gull

=== Steel blue ===
Steel blue

Color coordinates
- Hex triplet: #4682B4
- sRGB^{B} (r, g, b): (70, 130, 180)
- HSV (h, s, v): (207°, 61%, 71%)
- CIELCh_{uv} (L, C, h): (52, 54, 243°)
- Source: X11
- ISCC–NBS descriptor: Moderate blue
- B: Normalized to [0–255] (byte)

Steel blue is a color that resembles blue steel.

The first recorded use of steel blue as a color name in English was in 1817.

=== Cadet grey ===
Cadet grey

Color coordinates
- Hex triplet: #91A3B0
- sRGB^{B} (r, g, b): (145, 163, 176)
- HSV (h, s, v): (205°, 18%, 69%)
- CIELCh_{uv} (L, C, h): (66, 16, 231°)
- Source: ISCC-NBS
- ISCC–NBS descriptor: Grayish blue
- B: Normalized to [0–255] (byte)

Cadet grey, shown at right, and cadet blue, are shades of color used in military uniforms.

The first recorded use of cadet grey as a color name in English was in 1912. Before 1912, the word cadet grey was used as a name for a type of military issue uniform.

=== Cool gray ===
Gray-blue

Color coordinates
- Hex triplet: #8C92AC
- sRGB^{B} (r, g, b): (140, 146, 172)
- HSV (h, s, v): (229°, 19%, 67%)
- CIELCh_{uv} (L, C, h): (61, 22, 258°)
- Source: ISCC-NBS
- ISCC–NBS descriptor: Pale blue
- B: Normalized to [0–255] (byte)

Cool gray is a medium light color gray mixed with the color blue.

Another name for this color is gray-blue.

This color is a dull shade of blue-gray.

This color is identical with color sample #203 (identified as "gray blue") at the following website: https://web.archive.org/web/20170810183646/http://tx4.us/nbs/nbs-g.htm—The ISCC-NBS Dictionary of Colo(u)r Names (1955), a website for stamp collectors to evaluate the colors of their stamps.

=== Air Force blue ===
Air Force Blue

Color coordinates
- Hex triplet: #5D8AA8
- sRGB^{B} (r, g, b): (93, 138, 168)
- HSV (h, s, v): (204°, 45%, 66%)
- CIELCh_{uv} (L, C, h): (55, 37, 234°)
- Source: Vexillological:
- ISCC–NBS descriptor: Moderate greenish blue
- B: Normalized to [0–255] (byte)

Air force blue is a grayish shade of blue or azure used by the RAF.

There are other tones of air force blue, such as the darker one used by the United States Air Force.

=== Shadow blue ===
Shadow blue

Color coordinates
- Hex triplet: #778BA5
- sRGB^{B} (r, g, b): (119, 139, 165)
- HSV (h, s, v): (214°, 28%, 65%)
- CIELCh_{uv} (L, C, h): (57, 26, 244°)
- Source: Crayola
- ISCC–NBS descriptor: Grayish blue
- B: Normalized to [0–255] (byte)

The color shadow blue is displayed at right. Shadow blue is a color formulated by Crayola in 1990 as one of the colors in its Silver Swirls specialty box of metallic colors.

Although this is supposed to be a metallic color, there is no mechanism for displaying metallic colors on a computer.

=== Dark blue-gray ===
Dark blue-gray

Color coordinates
- Hex triplet: #666699
- sRGB^{B} (r, g, b): (102, 102, 153)
- HSV (h, s, v): (240°, 33%, 60%)
- CIELCh_{uv} (L, C, h): (45, 42, 266°)
- Source: WSC
- ISCC–NBS descriptor: Moderate purplish blue
- B: Normalized to [0–255] (byte)

The color dark blue-gray is displayed at right.

=== Roman silver ===
Roman silver

Color coordinates
- Hex triplet: #838996
- sRGB^{B} (r, g, b): (131, 137, 150)
- HSV (h, s, v): (221°, 13%, 59%)
- CIELCh_{uv} (L, C, h): (57, 12, 250°)
- Source: Resene
- ISCC–NBS descriptor: Bluish gray
- B: Normalized to [0–255] (byte)

At right is displayed the color Roman silver.

Roman silver is one of the colors on the Resene Color List, a color list widely popular in Australia and New Zealand.

This color is supposed to be a metallic color; however, there is no mechanism for displaying metallic colors on a flat computer screen.

=== Rhythm ===
Rhythm

Color coordinates
- Hex triplet: #777696
- sRGB^{B} (r, g, b): (119, 118, 150)
- HSV (h, s, v): (242°, 21%, 59%)
- CIELCh_{uv} (L, C, h): (51, 26, 267°)
- Source: Resene
- ISCC–NBS descriptor: Grayish purplish blue
- B: Normalized to [0–255] (byte)

Displayed at right is the color rhythm.

Rhythm is one of the colors on the Resene Color List, a color list widely popular in Australia and New Zealand. The color "rhythm" was formulated in 2004.

=== Payne's gray ===
Payne's gray

Color coordinates
- Hex triplet: #536878
- sRGB^{B} (r, g, b): (83, 104, 120)
- HSV (h, s, v): (206°, 31%, 47%)
- CIELCh_{uv} (L, C, h): (43, 19, 234°)
- Source: Ridgway:
- ISCC–NBS descriptor: Grayish blue
- B: Normalized to [0–255] (byte)

Payne's gray is a dark blue-gray color used in painting.

The first recorded use of Payne's grey as a color name in English was in 1835.

== Blue-gray in nature ==
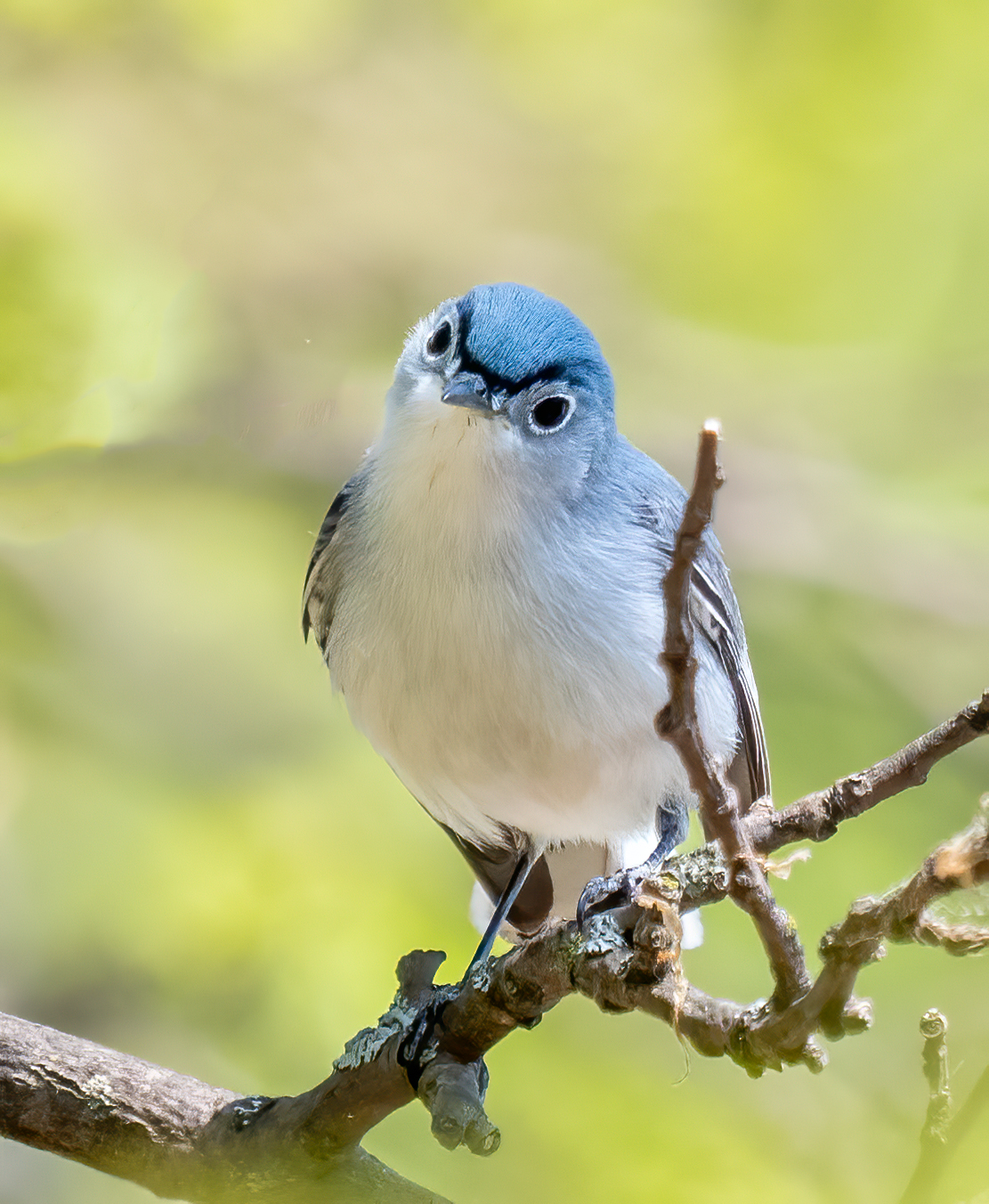
The blue-grey gnatcatcher

Insects

- Calliphora livida

Arachnids

- Haplopelma lividum

Birds

- Blue-grey gnatcatcher
- Blue-grey tanager

Mammals

- Blue-gray mouse

== Blue-gray in culture ==
Animal husbandry

- Blue Grey is a type of beef cattle popular in Scotland and the north of England.

Medicine/sociology

- Upper-class families who used silver eating utensils every day gradually ingested small pieces of silver into their bodies and eventually developed a mild form of a condition called argyria, in which the skin takes on a blue-gray color; thus, they became known as bluebloods.

Sports

- The Blue–Gray Football Classic was an annual American college football all-star game held in Alabama usually on Christmas Day. It began in 1939 and was held annually through 2001 at the Cramton Bowl in Montgomery, Alabama. It pitted players from the former Confederacy against players from the northern and western states of the United States.

Transportation planning

- In the Muni Metro, San Francisco's light rail system, the K Ingleside line (which goes to the Ingleside neighborhood), is represented by the color blue-gray.

== See also ==
- RAL 5008 Grey blue
- RAL 7031 Blue grey
- List of colors
