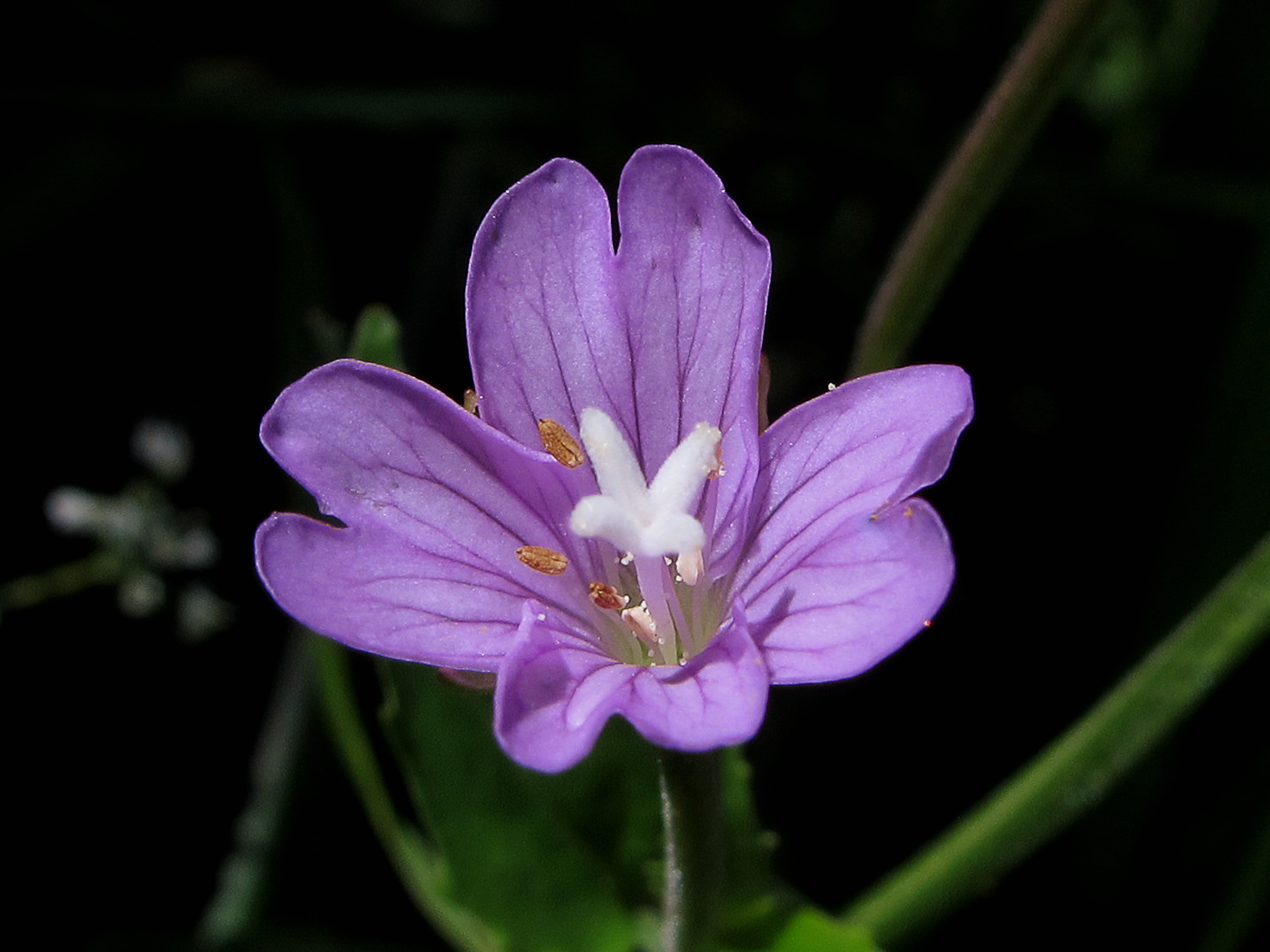

Scientific classification
- Kingdom: Plantae
- Clade: Tracheophytes
- Clade: Angiosperms
- Clade: Eudicots
- Clade: Rosids
- Order: Myrtales
- Family: Onagraceae
- Genus: Epilobium
- Species: E. montanum

Binomial name
- Epilobium montanum L.

= Epilobium montanum =

Species of flowering plant in the willowherb family

Epilobium montanum or Broad-leaved Willowherb is a species of flowering plant in the willowherb family Onagraceae.

== Description ==
This species grows to 60 cm (24 in) high. The leaves are hairless and serrate and ovate-lanceolate. They are mostly positioned opposite and have short stalks. The flowers are pale mauve and about 8 mm across with a 4-lobed stigma in terminal racemes.

== Distribution ==
Common throughout Britain and Ireland as well as most of Europe. The species is present in the Pannonian macroregion, confirmed with herbarium specimens.

It is also present in central and eastern Asia and has been introduced in North America, Japan and New Zealand.

== Ecology ==
It is typically found on disturbed ground, base-rich soils, in hedges and as a garden weed.

== Medicine ==
Epilobium montanum herb has been used in the traditional Austrian medicine internally as tea for treatment of disorders of the prostate, kidneys, and urinary tract. A review of studies of the use of extracts from Epolobium species indicated that there was some evidence for traditional uses with digestive disorders. The extracts contained mixtures of flavonoids, phenolic acids and tannins, with the tannin oenothein B possibly a major contributor to biological activity. There was not sufficient evidence of efficacy in prostate disorders.
