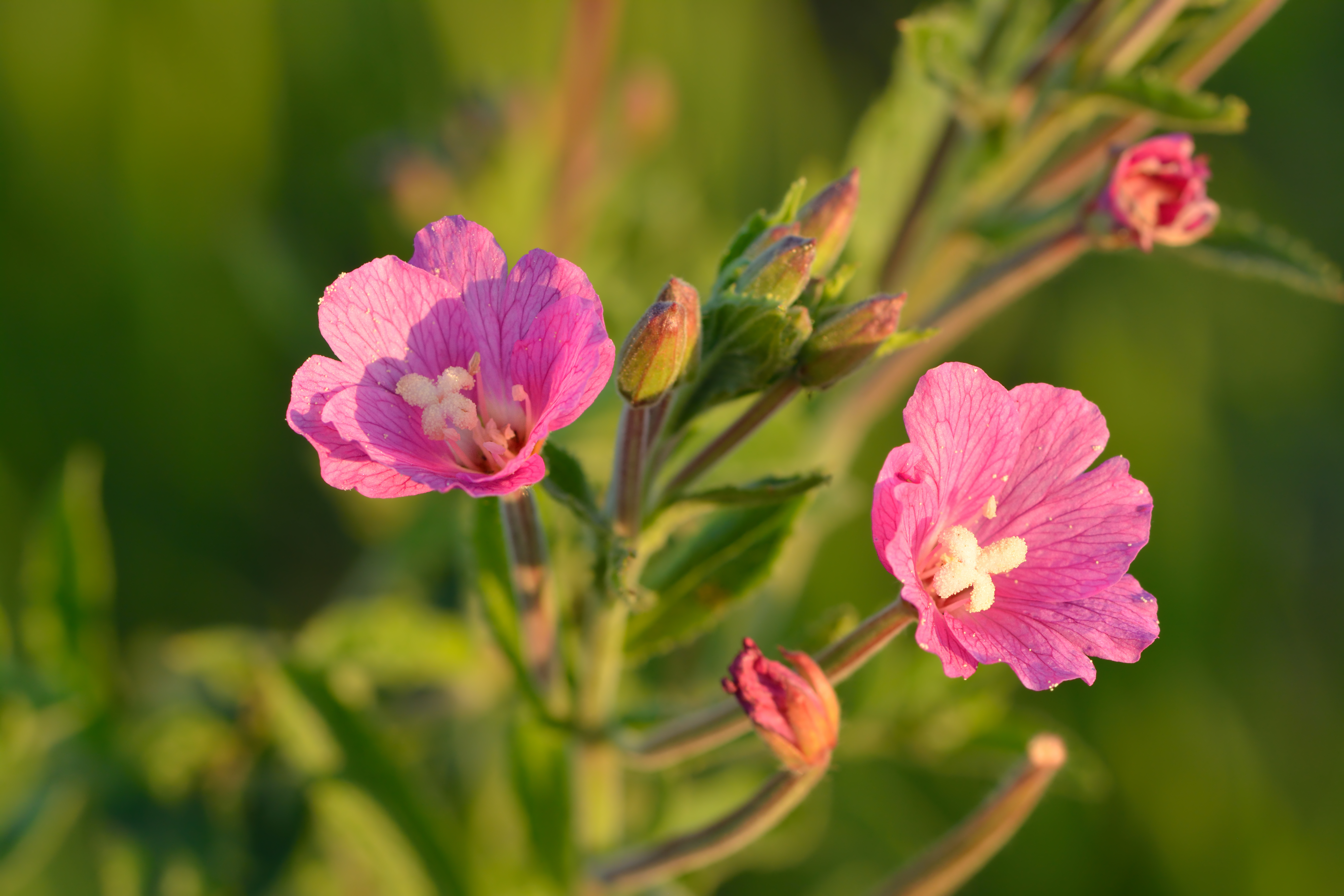

Scientific classification
- Kingdom: Plantae
- Clade: Tracheophytes
- Clade: Angiosperms
- Clade: Eudicots
- Clade: Rosids
- Order: Myrtales
- Family: Onagraceae
- Genus: Epilobium
- Species: E. hirsutum

Binomial name
- Epilobium hirsutum L.3

Synonyms
- List: Chamaenerion grandiflorum (Weber) Moench; Chamaenerion hirsutum (L.) Scop.; Epilobium amplexicaule Lam.; Epilobium aquaticum Thuill.; Epilobium dubium Borbás; Epilobium foliosum Hochst.; Epilobium grandiflorum All.; Epilobium grandiflorum Weber; Epilobium himalense Royle; Epilobium hirsutum subsp. grandiflorum Ehrh.; Epilobium incanum Pers.; Epilobium mirei Quézel; Epilobium nassirelinulci Stapf; Epilobium ramosum Huds.; Epilobium serratum Jacquem. ex C.B.Clarke; Epilobium tomentosum Vent.; Epilobium velutinum Nevski; Epilobium villosum Thunb.

= Epilobium hirsutum =

Plant species in the willowherb family

Epilobium hirsutum is a flowering plant belonging to the willowherb genus Epilobium in the family Onagraceae. It is commonly known as the great willowherb, great hairy willowherb or hairy willowherb. Local dialectal names include codlins and cream, apple pie and cherry pie.

== Description ==
It is a tall, perennial plant, reaching up to 2 metres in height. The robust stems are profusely hairy with soft spreading hairs. The hairy leaves are 2–12 cm long and 0.5–3.5 cm wide. They are long and thin and are widest below the middle. They have sharply toothed edges and no stalk. The large flowers have four notched petals. These are purple-pink and are usually 10–16 mm long. There are 8 stamens. The stigma is white and has four lobes. The sepals are green.

It is relatively easy to distinguish from similar species at least in much of its European range, where its flowers are among species of its genus present there.

Close-up of flower

Leaf and stem

== Distribution and habitat ==
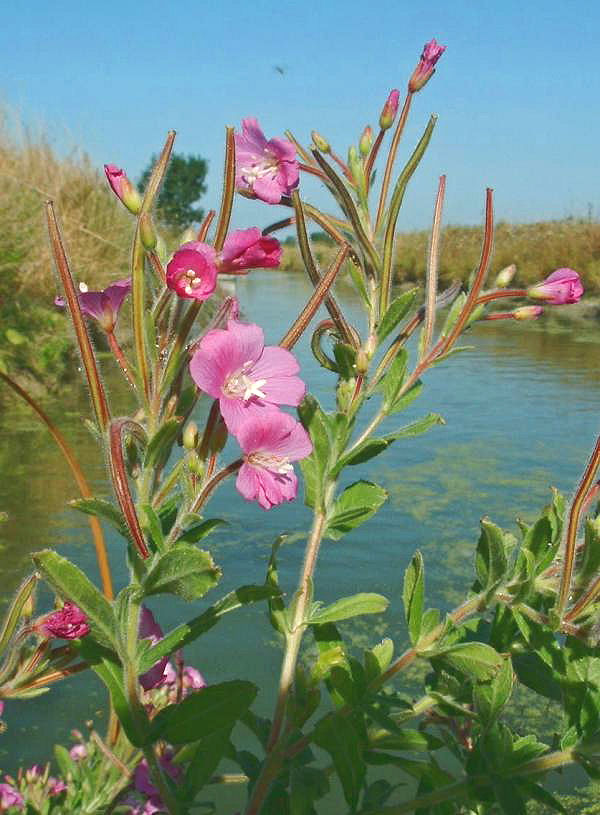
Growing by a river bank

The native range of the species includes North Africa, most of Europe up to southern Sweden, and parts of Asia. It is absent from much of Scandinavia and north-west Scotland. It has been introduced to North America and Australia.

It typically grows in wet or damp habitats without dense tree-cover up to 2,500 metres above sea-level. Common habitats include marshland and the banks of rivers and streams. It also occurs in anthropogenic contexts such as wet ditches and in general in places rich in nitrates. It flowers from June to September, with a peak in July and August.

== Ecology ==
Epilobium hirsutum inhabits damp and waste places, river-sides and ditches.

The flowers are visited by many types of insects, and can be characterized by a generalized pollination syndrome. A number of insects feed on the leaves including the elephant hawkmoth, Deilephila elpenor.

== Trichomes ==
The plant shows glandular trichomes. They are unicellular, without a specialized basal cell. They have a cutinized cell wall and a protruding pore on the top. The upper part of the trichome cell contains flavonoids, e.g. quercitrin and myricitrin.

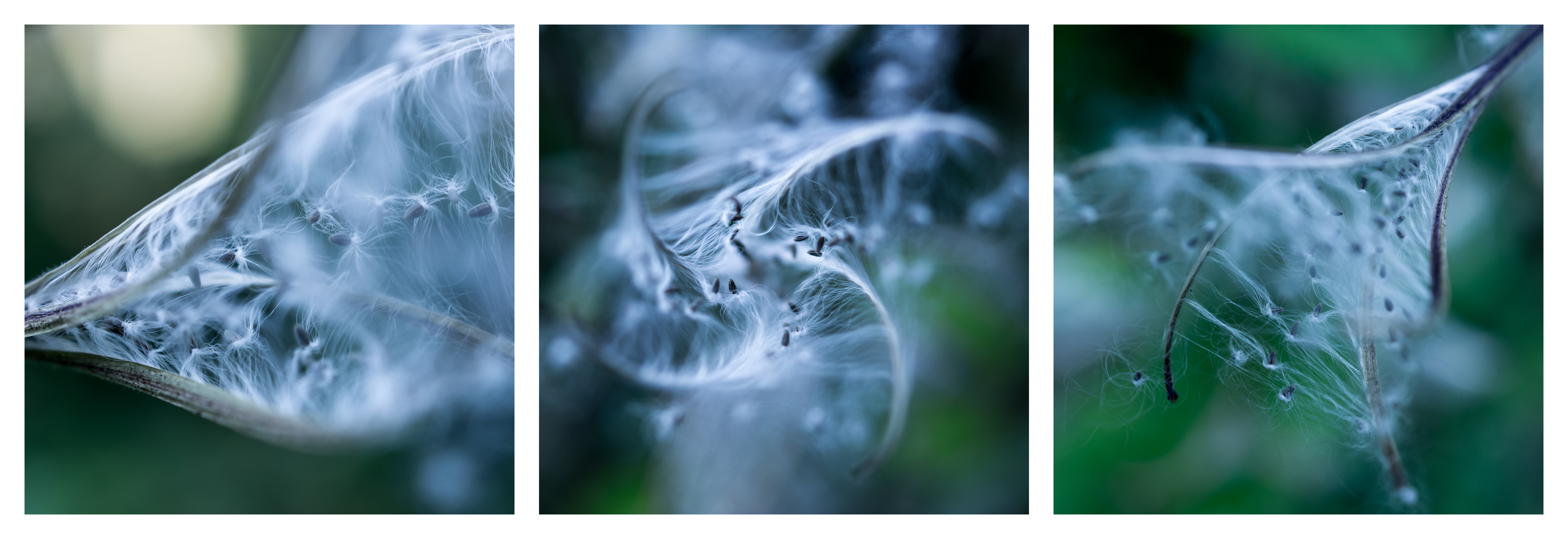
Epilobium hirsutum seed heads

== Bibliography ==
- Blamey, Marjorie & Grey-Wilson, Christopher (2003) Cassell's Wild Flowers of Britain and Northern Europe, Cassell, London.
- Press, J. R.; Sutton, D. A. & Tebbs, B. M. (1981) Field Guide to the Wild Flowers of Britain, Reader's Digest, London.
- Strgulc Krajšek, Sumona; Šegedin, Tamara; Jogan, Nejc (2009-06-30). "Revision of Epilobium and Chamerion in the Croatian herbaria ZA and ZAHO". Natura Croatica. 18 (1): 155–167. eISSN 1848-7386.
- Tutin, T. G. et al. (1968) Flora Europaea, Volume 2. Cambridge University Press. ISBN 0-521-06662-X
