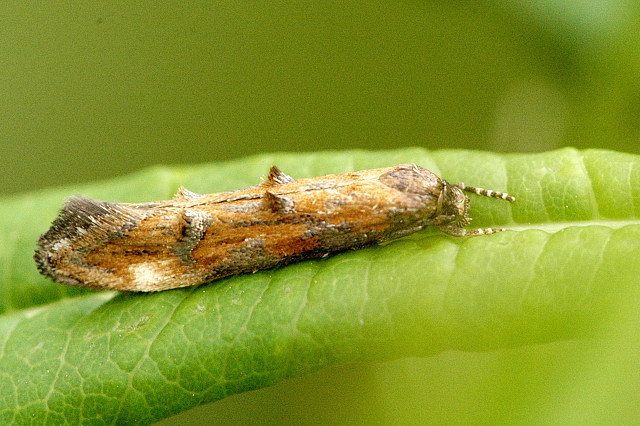
- Mompha idaei

Scientific classification
- Kingdom: Animalia
- Phylum: Arthropoda
- Clade: Pancrustacea
- Class: Insecta
- Order: Lepidoptera
- Infraorder: Heteroneura
- Clade: Eulepidoptera
- Clade: Ditrysia
- Clade: Apoditrysia
- Superfamily: Gelechioidea
- Family: Momphidae; Herrich-Schäffer, 1857

Genera
- See text

Synonyms
- Momphina Herrich-Schäffer, 1857; Momphinae Zimmerman, 1978; Lavernidae Wocke, 1871; Psacaphorinae Spuler, 1898

= Momphidae =

Family of moths

The Momphidae, or mompha moths, is a family of moths with some 115 described species. It was described by Gottlieb August Wilhelm Herrich-Schäffer in 1857. These moths tend to be rather small with a wingspan of up to 21 mm. The wings are held folded over the body at rest. The larvae are concealed feeders, either as leaf miners or within seeds or stems.

== Genera ==
- Anchimompha Clarke, 1965
- Batrachedrodes Zimmerman, 1978
- Bifascia Amsel, 1961
- Desertidacna Sinev, 1988
- Gracilosia Sinev, 1989
- Inflataria Sinev, 1989
- Licmocera Walsingham, 1891
- Mompha Hübner, [1825]
  - subgenus Anybia
  - subgenus Cyphophora
  - subgenus Lophoptilus
  - subgenus Psacaphora
- Moriloma Busck, 1912
- Palaeomystella T. B. Fletcher, 1940
- Patanotis Meyrick, 1913
- Phalaritica Meyrick, 1913
- Semeteria Sinev, 1989
- Synallagma Engel, 1907
- Zapyrastra Meyrick, 1889

== Former genera ==
- Batrachedropsis (synonym of Coccidiphila in Cosmopterigidae)
- Coccidiphila (now in Cosmopterigidae)
- Isorrhoa (now in Cosmopterigidae)
- Lacciferophaga
- Laverna
- Lienigia
- Tenuipenna (synonym of Pyroderces in Cosmopterigidae)
- Urodeta (now in Elachistidae)
