= Creeping willowherb =

The name creeping willowherb can refer to several species of flowering plant:

- Epilobium brunnescens, native to New Zealand and Australia
- Epilobium komarovianum
