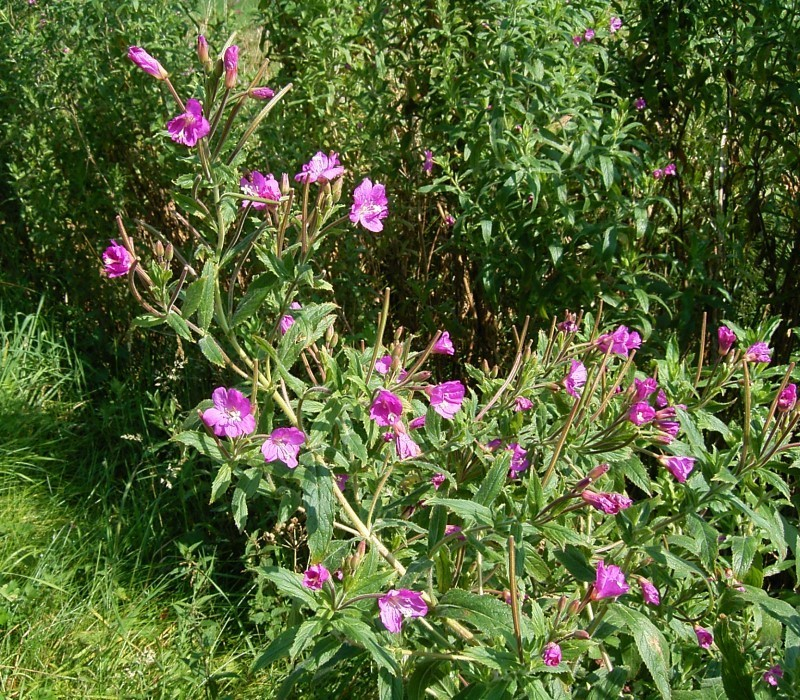
- Epilobium hirsutum (great willowherb)

Scientific classification
- Kingdom: Plantae
- Clade: Tracheophytes
- Clade: Angiosperms
- Clade: Eudicots
- Clade: Rosids
- Order: Myrtales
- Family: Onagraceae
- Subfamily: Onagroideae
- Tribe: Epilobieae
- Genus: Epilobium; L.

Type species
- Epilobium hirsutum L.

Species
- 192, see here

Synonyms
- Boisduvalia Spach; Chamaenerion Ség.; Chamerion (Raf.) Raf. ex Holub; Cordylophorum Rydb.; Cratericarpium Spach; Crossostigma Spach; Epilobiopsis Speg. ex H.Lév.; Pyrogennema Lunell; Zauschneria C.Presl

= Epilobium =

Genus of flowering plants

Epilobium is a genus of flowering plants in the family Onagraceae, containing about 197 species. The genus has a worldwide distribution. It is most prevalent in the subarctic, temperate and subantarctic regions, whereas in the subtropics and tropics Epilobium species are restricted to the cool montane biomes, such as the New Guinea Highlands.

The taxonomy of the genus has varied between different botanists, but the modern trend is to include the previously recognised genera Boisduvalia, Chamaenerion (previously Chamerion), Pyrogennema and Zauschneria within Epilobium according to Peter H. Raven, who has extensively studied the willowherbs and merges the other segregate genera into Epilobium. Fringed willowherb (Epilobium ciliatum) is likely a cryptic species complex; apparently these plants also commonly hybridize with their congeners.

Most species are known by the common name willowherbs for their willow-like leaves. Those that were once separated in Boisduvalia are called spike-primroses or boisduvalias. Those Epilobium species previously placed in the Chamaenerion group are known as fireweeds.

== Description ==
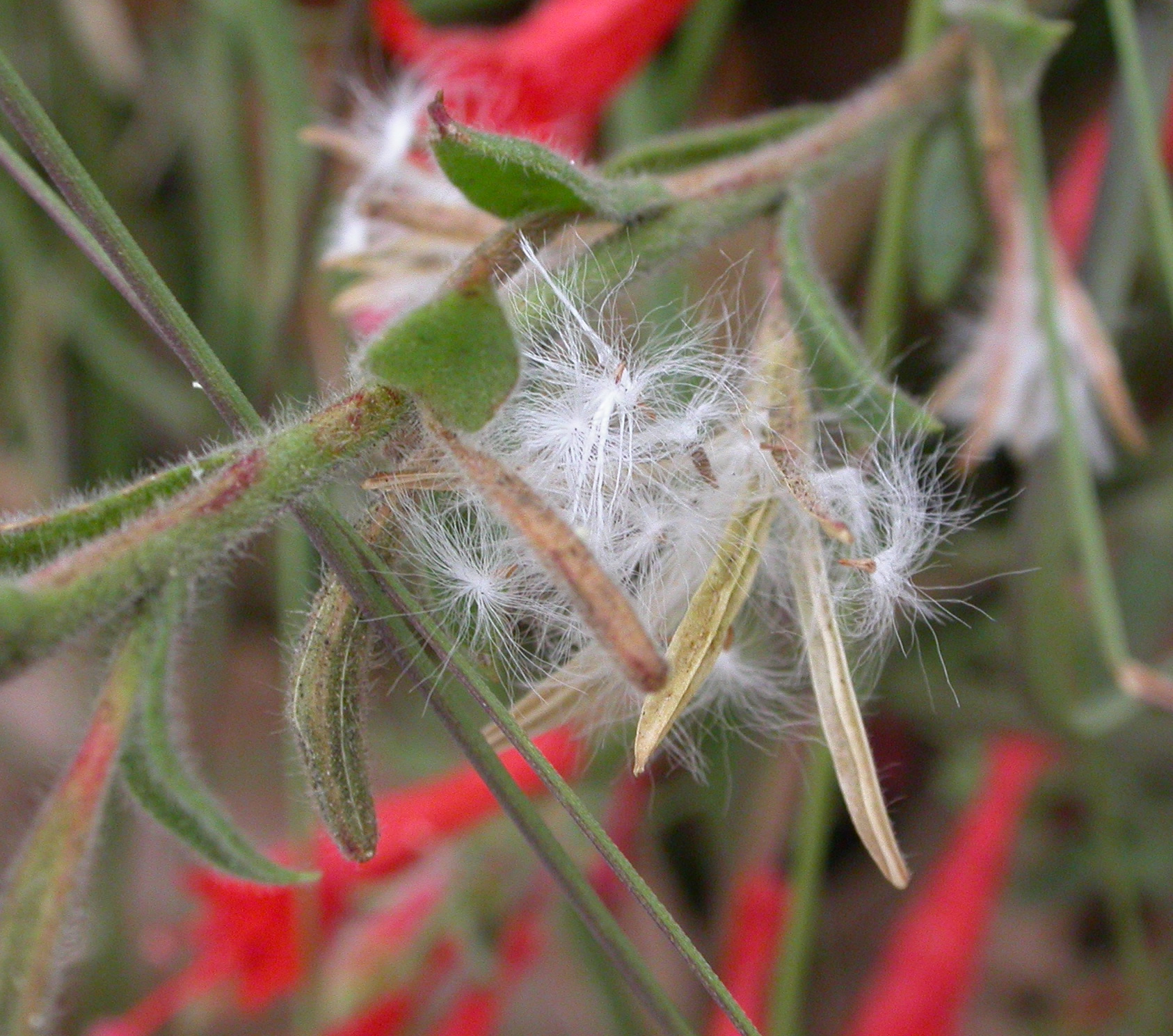
Ripe capsule of Epilobium canum (zauschneria) releasing seed

Epilobium are mostly herbaceous plants, either annual or perennial; a few are subshrubs. The leaves are opposite or rarely whorled, simple and ovate to lanceolate in shape. The flowers are actinomorphic (radially symmetrical) with four petals that may be notched. These are usually smallish and pink in most species, but red, orange or yellow in a few. The fruit is a slender cylindrical capsule containing numerous seeds embedded in fine, soft silky fluff which disperses the seeds very effectively in the wind.

A number of Epilobium species with slightly asymmetrical (zygomorphic) magenta flowers and alternate leaves are placed in the genus Chamaenerion, which may be further separated by some authorities into a genus Chamerion. However, Chamerion is not universally accepted.

== Taxonomy ==
It was described by Carl Linnaeus in 1753 based on previous work by Johann Jacob Dillenius. The type species is Epilobium hirsutum L.

=== Etymology ===
The genus name derives from the Greek words "epi" meaning "upon" and "lobos" meaning "lobe", with reference to position of the petals above the ovary.

=== Species ===
The following species are recognised in the genus Epilobium:

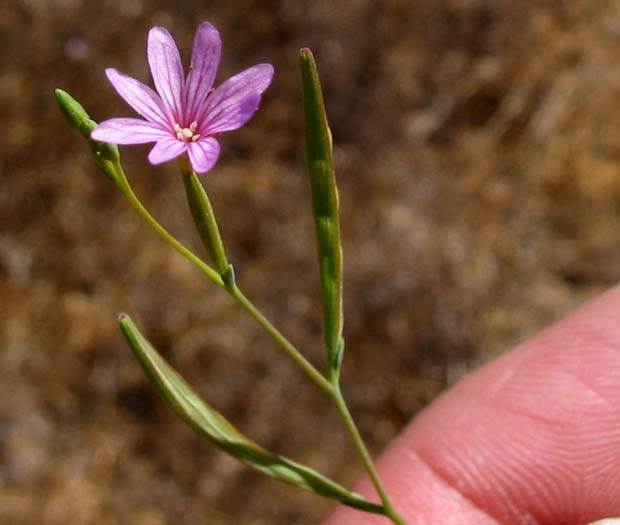
Epilobium brachycarpum (tall willowherb)

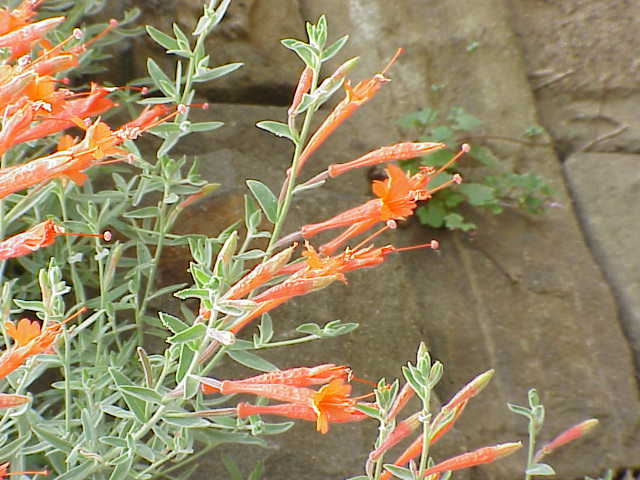
Epilobium canum (zauschneria)

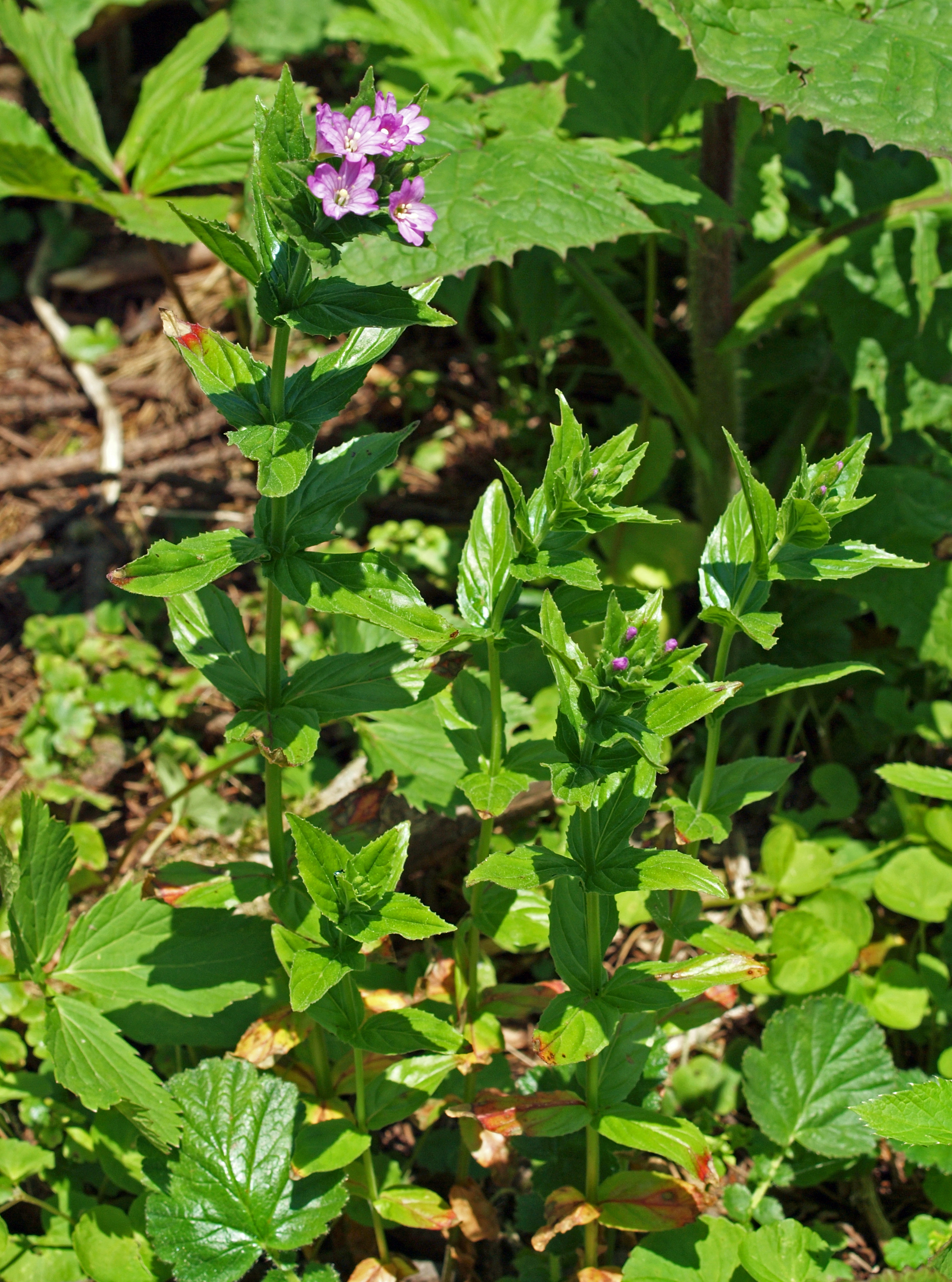
Epilobium alpestre

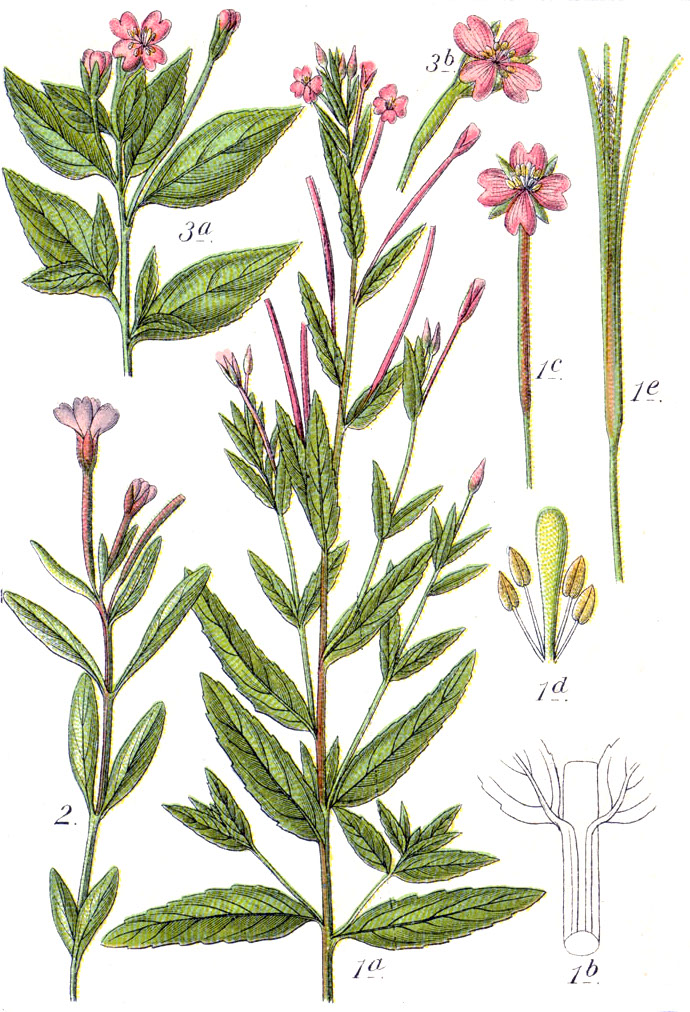
Top left: Epilobium alsinifolium (chickweed willowherb) Bottom left: Epilobium anagallidifolium (alpine willowherb) Center: Epilobium tetragonum (square-stemmed willowherb)

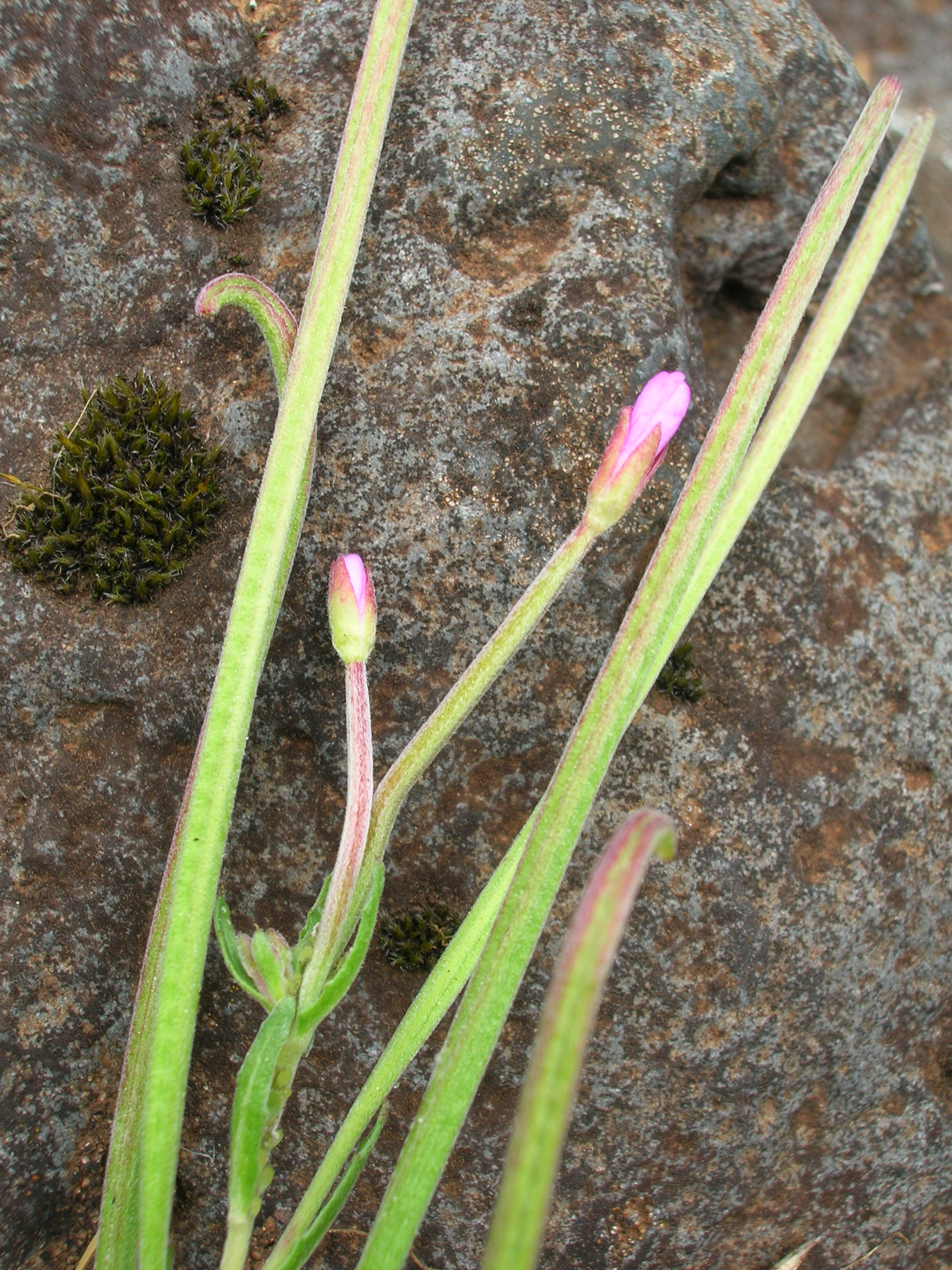
Epilobium billardierianum

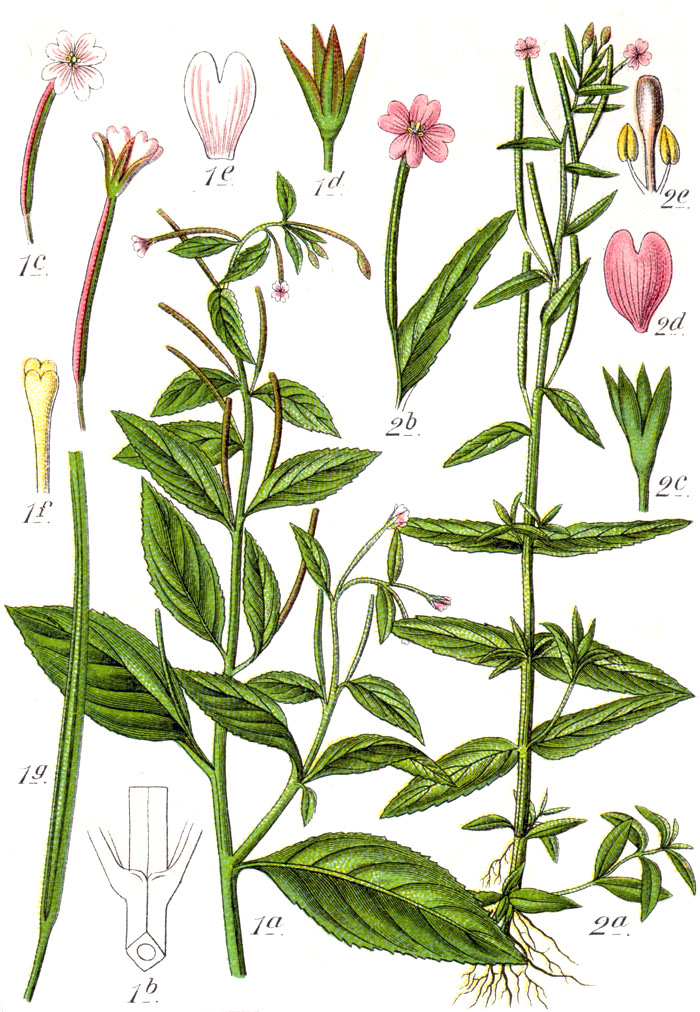
Left: Epilobium roseum (pale willowherb) Right: Epilobium obscurum (dwarf willowherb)

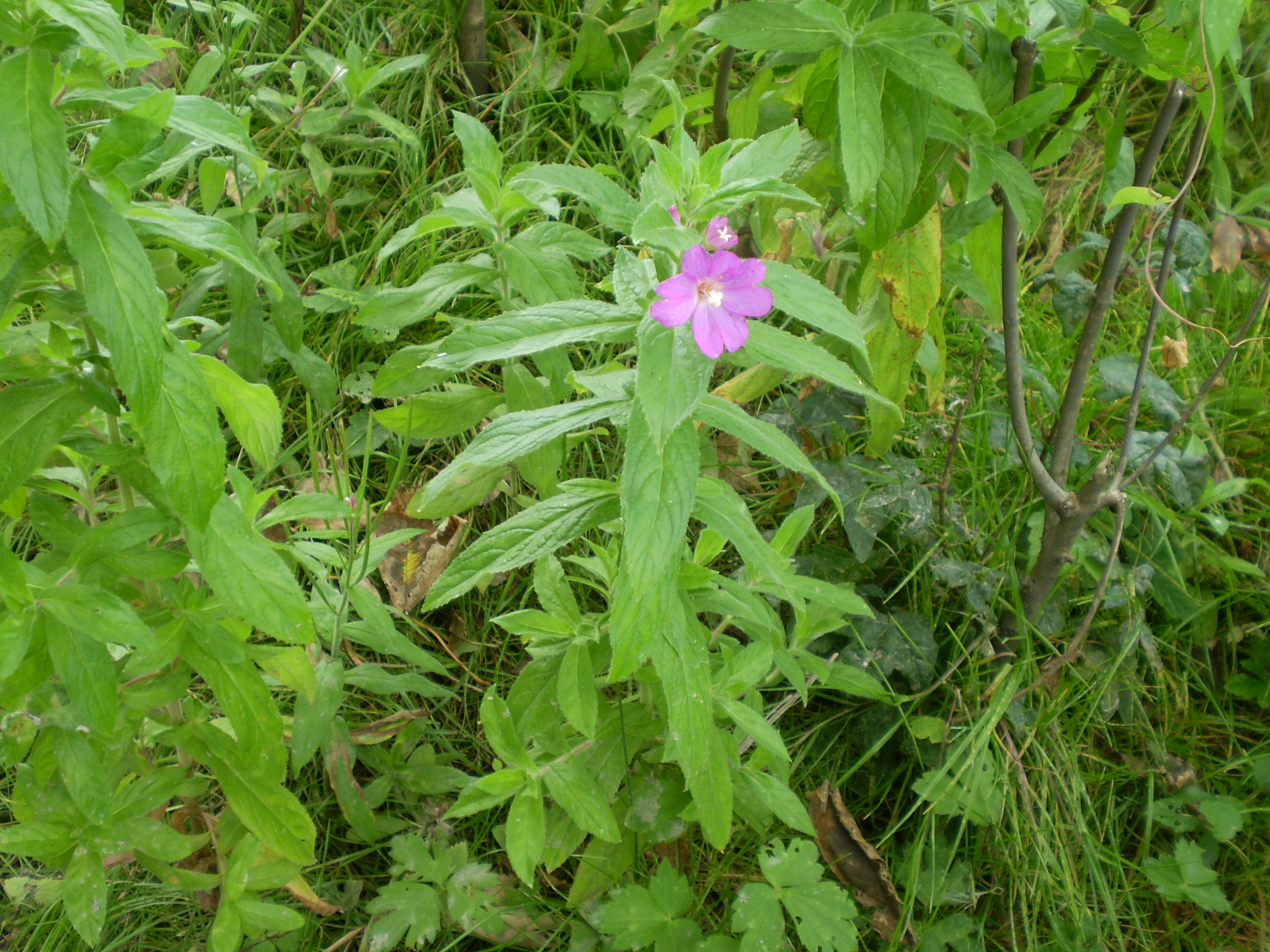
Epilobium parviflorum (small-flowered willowherb)

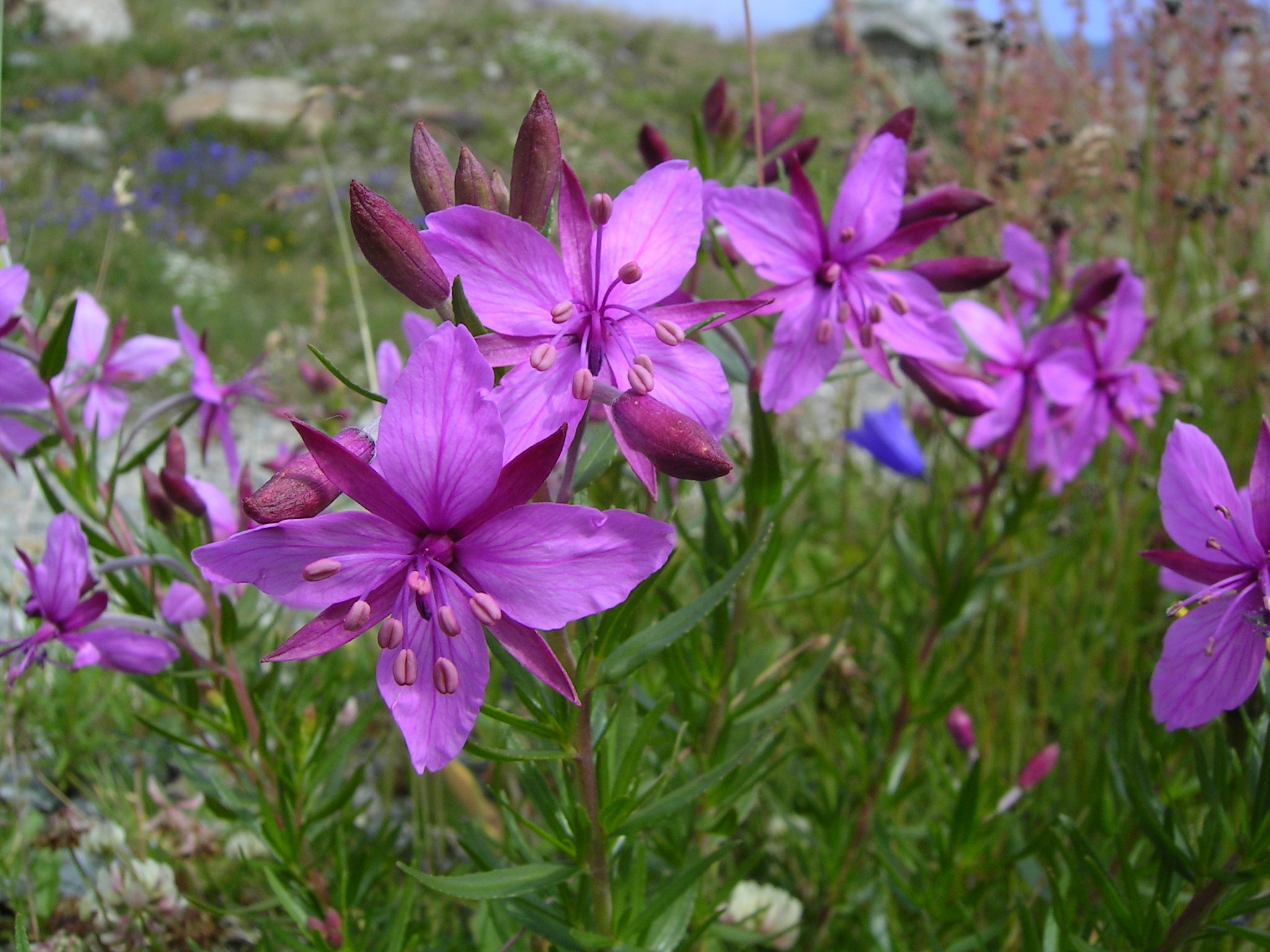
Chamaenerion fleischeri

- Epilobium × abortivum Hausskn.
- Epilobium × aggregatum Čelak.
- Epilobium aitchisonii P.H.Raven
- Epilobium algidum M.Bieb.
- Epilobium alpestre (Jacq.) Krock.
- Epilobium alsinifolium Vill. – chickweed willowherb
- Epilobium alsinoides A.Cunn.
- Epilobium × amphibolum Hausskn.
- Epilobium amurense Hausskn.
- Epilobium anagallidifolium Lam. – alpine willowherb, pimpernel willowherb
- Epilobium anatolicum Hausskn.
- Epilobium anglicum E.S.Marshall
- Epilobium angustifolium L.
- Epilobium angustum (Cheeseman) P.H.Raven & Engelhorn
- Epilobium arcticum Sam. – Arctic willowherb
- Epilobium × argillaceum Kitch.
- Epilobium arvernense Rouy & E.G.Camus
- Epilobium × aschersonianum Hausskn.
- Epilobium astonii (Allan) P.H.Raven & Engelhorn
- Epilobium atlanticum Litard. & Maire
- Epilobium australe Poepp. & Hausskn.
- Epilobium barbeyanum H.Lév.
- Epilobium billardiereanum Ser. – glabrous willowherb
- Epilobium blinii H.Lév.
- Epilobium × boissieri Hausskn.
- Epilobium × borbasianum Hausskn.
- Epilobium × brachiatum Čelak.
- Epilobium brachycarpum C.Presl – tall willowherb, tall annual willowherb, tall fireweed, panicled willowherb
- Epilobium brevifolium D.Don
- Epilobium brevipes Hook.f.
- Epilobium × brevipilum Hausskn.
- Epilobium brevisquamatum P.H.Raven
- Epilobium × brunnatum Kitch. & McKean
- Epilobium brunnescens (Cockayne) P.H.Raven & Engelhorn – New Zealand willowherb
- Epilobium campestre (Jeps.) Hoch & W.L.Wagner – pygmy willowherb, smooth boisduvalia
- Epilobium canum (Greene) P.H.Raven – Zauschneria, California-fuchsia, hummingbird flower, hummingbird trumpet
- Epilobium capense Buchinger ex Krauss
- Epilobium × celakovskyanum Hausskn.
- Epilobium × chateri Kitch. & McKean
- Epilobium chionanthum Hausskn.
- Epilobium chitralense P.H.Raven
- Epilobium chlorifolium Hausskn.
- Epilobium ciliatum Raf. – fringed willowherb, American willowherb
- Epilobium clarkeanum Hausskn.
- Epilobium clavatum Trel. – talus willowherb, clavatefruit willowherb
- Epilobium cleistogamum (Curran) Hoch & P.H.Raven – selfing willowherb
- Epilobium cockayneanum Petrie
- Epilobium colchicum Albov
- Epilobium collinum C.C.Gmel.
- Epilobium coloratum Biehler – purpleleaf willowherb
- Epilobium confertifolium Hook.f.
- Epilobium × confine Hausskn.
- Epilobium × confusilobum Kitch. & McKean
- Epilobium confusum Hausskn.
- Epilobium conjungens Skottsb.
- Epilobium conspersum Hausskn.
- Epilobium × cornubiense Kitch. & McKean
- Epilobium crassum Hook.f.
- Epilobium curtisiae P.H.Raven
- Epilobium cylindricum D.Don
- Epilobium × dacicum Borbás
- Epilobium × dasycarpum Fr.
- Epilobium davuricum Fisch. ex Hornem. – Daurian willowherb
- Epilobium × decipiens F.W.Schultz
- Epilobium densiflorum (Lindl.) Hoch & P.H.Raven – denseflower willowherb, dense spike-primrose, dense boisduvalia
- Epilobium densifolium Hausskn.
- Epilobium densum Raf. – downy willowherb, stiff spike-primrose
- Epilobium denticulatum Ruiz & Pav.
- Epilobium detznerianum Schltr. ex Diels
- Epilobium dodonaei Vill.
- Epilobium duriaei J.Gay ex Godr.
- Epilobium elegans Petrie
- Epilobium × erroneum Hausskn.
- Epilobium × fallacinum Hausskn.
- Epilobium fangii C.J.Chen, Hoch & P.H.Raven
- Epilobium fastigiatoramosum Nakai
- Epilobium fauriei H.Lév.
- Epilobium × finitimum Hausskn.
- Epilobium fleischeri Hochst.
- Epilobium × floridulum Smejkal
- Epilobium forbesii Allan
- Epilobium × fossicola Smejkal
- Epilobium fragile Sam.
- Epilobium fugitivum P.H.Raven & Engelhorn
- Epilobium gemmascens C.A.Mey.
- Epilobium × gemmiferum Boreau
- Epilobium × gerstlaueri Rubner
- Epilobium glabellum G.Forst. – smooth spike-primrose
- Epilobium glaberrimum Barbey – glaucous willowherb
- Epilobium glaciale P.H.Raven
- Epilobium × glanduligerum K.Knaf
- Epilobium glaucum Phil.
- Epilobium × goerzii Rubner
- Epilobium gouldii P.H.Raven
- Epilobium gracilipes Kirk
- Epilobium × grenieri Rouy & E.G.Camus
- Epilobium griffithianum Hausskn.
- Epilobium gunnianum Hausskn.
- Epilobium × gutteanum Gnüchtel
- Epilobium hallianum Hausskn. – glandular willowherb
- Epilobium × haussknechtianum Borbás
- Epilobium × haynaldianum Hausskn.
- Epilobium × hectori-leveilleanum Thell.
- Epilobium hectorii Hausskn.
- Epilobium × heterocaulon Borbás
- Epilobium hirsutum L. – great willowherb, great hairy willowherb, hairy willowherb, codlins-and-cream, apple-pie, cherry-pie
- Epilobium hirtigerum A.Cunn.
- Epilobium hohuanense S.S.Ying
- Epilobium hooglandii P.H.Raven
- Epilobium hornemannii Rchb. – Hornemann's willowherb
- Epilobium howellii Hoch – Yuba Pass willowherb, subalpine fireweed
- Epilobium × huteri Borbás ex Hausskn.
- Epilobium indicum Hausskn.
- Epilobium insulare Hausskn.
- Epilobium × interjectum Smejkal
- Epilobium × intersitum Hausskn.
- Epilobium × jinshaense P.H.Raven & H.Li
- Epilobium karsteniae Compton
- Epilobium × keredjense Bornm. & Gauba
- Epilobium kermodei P.H.Raven
- Epilobium keysseri Diels
- Epilobium kingdonii P.H.Raven
- Epilobium × kitcheneri McKean
- Epilobium komarovianum H.Lév. – bronzy willowherb
- Epilobium komarovii Ovcz.
- Epilobium korshinskyi Morozova
- Epilobium × krausei R.Uechtr. & Hausskn.
- Epilobium lactiflorum Hausskn. – milkflower willowherb, whiteflower willowherb
- Epilobium ladakhianum T.K.Paul
- Epilobium laestadii Kytöv.
- Epilobium × lamotteanum Hausskn.
- Epilobium lanceolatum Sebast. & Mauri – spear-leaved willowherb
- Epilobium × langeanum Hausskn.
- Epilobium × laschianum Hausskn.
- Epilobium latifolium L.
- Epilobium laxum Royle
- Epilobium leiophyllum Hausskn.
- Epilobium leptocarpum Hausskn. – slenderfruit willowherb
- Epilobium leptophyllum Raf. – bog willowherb, linear-leaved willowherb
- Epilobium × limosum Schur
- Epilobium lipschitzii Pachom.
- Epilobium luteum Pursh – yellow willowherb
- Epilobium macropus Hook.
- Epilobium margaretiae Brockie
- Epilobium × marshallianum Hausskn.
- Epilobium matthewsii Petrie
- Epilobium maysillesii Munz
- Epilobium melanocaulon Hook.
- Epilobium × mentiens Smejkal
- Epilobium microphyllum A.Rich.
- Epilobium minutiflorum Hausskn.
- Epilobium minutum Lindl. ex Lehm. – chaparral willowherb, desert willowherb, smallflower willowherb
- Epilobium mirabile Trel. ex Piper – Olympic Mountain willowherb
- Epilobium × montaniforme K.Knaf ex Čelak.
- Epilobium montanum L. – broad-leaved willowherb
- Epilobium nanhualpinum S.S.Ying
- Epilobium nankotaizanense Yamam. – Nankotaizan willowherb
- Epilobium × neogradiense Borbás
- Epilobium nerterioides A.Cunn.
- Epilobium nevadense Munz – Nevada willowherb
- Epilobium nivale Meyen
- Epilobium nivium Brandegee – Snow Mountain willowherb
- Epilobium × novae-civitatis Smejkal
- Epilobium nummulariifolium R.Cunn. ex A.Cunn.
- Epilobium nutans F.W.Schmidt
- Epilobium × nutantiflorum Smejkal
- Epilobium obcordatum A.Gray – rockfringe willowherb
- Epilobium × obscurescens Kitch. & McKean
- Epilobium obscurum Schreb. – dwarf willowherb, short-fruited willowherb
- Epilobium oreganum Greene – Grants Pass willowherb, Oregon fireweed
- Epilobium oregonense Hausskn. – Oregon willowherb
- Epilobium × palatinum F.W.Schultz
- Epilobium pallidiflorum Sol. ex A.Cunn.
- Epilobium pallidum (Eastw.) Hoch & P.H.Raven – largeflower spike-primrose
- Epilobium palustre L. – marsh willowherb
- Epilobium pannosum Hausskn.
- Epilobium parviflorum Schreb. – small-flowered willowherb, hoary willowherb
- Epilobium pedicellare C.Presl
- Epilobium pedunculare A.Cunn. – rockery willowherb
- Epilobium pengii C.J.Chen, Hoch & P.H.Raven
- Epilobium × percollinum Simonk.
- Epilobium pernitens Cockayne & Allan
- Epilobium perpusillum Hausskn.
- Epilobium × persicinum Rchb.
- Epilobium petraeum Heenan
- Epilobium pictum Petrie
- Epilobium platystigmatosum C.B.Rob.
- Epilobium ponticum Hausskn.
- Epilobium porphyrium G.Simpson
- Epilobium × prionophylloides Hand.-Mazz.
- Epilobium prostratum Warb.
- Epilobium pseudorubescens A.K.Skvortsov
- Epilobium × pseudotrigonum Borbás
- Epilobium psilotum Maire & Sam.
- Epilobium pubens A.Rich.
- Epilobium puberulum Hook. & Arn.
- Epilobium × pulchrum Suksd.
- Epilobium purpuratum Hook.f.
- Epilobium × purpureum Fr.
- Epilobium pycnostachyum Hausskn.
- Epilobium pyrricholophum Franch. & Sav.
- Epilobium ravenii Hoch & Gandhi – leafy willowherb, California willowherb
- Epilobium rechingeri P.H.Raven
- Epilobium × reedii H.Lév.
- Epilobium rhynchospermum Hausskn.
- Epilobium rigidum Hausskn. – stiff willowherb, Siskiyou Mountains willowherb
- Epilobium × rivulare Wahlenb.
- Epilobium × rivulicola Hausskn.
- Epilobium roseum (Schreb.) Schreb. – pale willowherb
- Epilobium rostratum Cheeseman
- Epilobium rotundifolium G.Forst.
- Epilobium royleanum Hausskn.
- Epilobium rubromarginatum Cockayne
- Epilobium salignum Hausskn.
- Epilobium sarmentaceum Hausskn.
- Epilobium saximontanum Hausskn. – Rocky Mountain willowherb
- Epilobium × schmidtianum Rostk.
- Epilobium × schulzeanum Hausskn.
- Epilobium semiamplexicaule H.J.Chowdhery & S.Singh
- Epilobium septentrionale (D.D.Keck) Bowman & Hoch – northern willowherb, Humboldt County fuchsia
- Epilobium × sericeum Bernh.
- Epilobium sikkimense Hausskn.
- Epilobium × similatum Hausskn.
- Epilobium × simulatum Hausskn.
- Epilobium sinense H.Lév.
- Epilobium siskiyouense (Munz) Hoch & P.H.Raven – Siskiyou willowherb, Siskiyou fireweed
- Epilobium smithii H.Lév.
- Epilobium speciosum Decne.
- Epilobium spitianum H.J.Chowdhery & Murti
- Epilobium staintonii P.H.Raven
- Epilobium stereophyllum Fresen.
- Epilobium stevenii Boiss.
- Epilobium stracheyanum Hausskn.
- Epilobium subalgidum Hausskn.
- Epilobium subcoriaceum Hausskn.
- Epilobium subdentatum (Meyen) Lievens & Hoch
- Epilobium suffruticosum Nutt. – shrubby willowherb
- Epilobium × surreyanum E.S.Marshall
- Epilobium taiwanianum C.J.Chen, Hoch & P.H.Raven
- Epilobium tasmanicum Hausskn.
- Epilobium tetragonum L. – square-stemmed willowherb
- Epilobium thermophilum Paulsen
- Epilobium × thuringiacum Hausskn.
- Epilobium tianschanicum Pavlov
- Epilobium tibetanum Hausskn.
- Epilobium tonkinense H.Lév.
- Epilobium torreyi (S.Watson) Hoch & P.H.Raven – Torrey's willowherb, brook spike-primrose
- Epilobium × treleaseanum H.Lév.
- Epilobium trichophyllum Hausskn.
- Epilobium tulinianum S.S.Ying
- Epilobium turkestanicum Pazij & Vved.
- Epilobium × udicola Hausskn.
- Epilobium × uechtritzianum Pax
- Epilobium ulleungensis J.Chung
- Epilobium vernicosum Cheeseman
- Epilobium vernonicum Snogerup
- Epilobium verticillatum W.X.Wang, W.Y.Guo & Y.S.Fu
- Epilobium × vicinum Smejkal
- Epilobium wallichianum Hausskn.
- Epilobium × waterfallii E.S.Marshall
- Epilobium wattianum Hausskn.
- Epilobium williamsii P.H.Raven
- Epilobium willisii P.H.Raven & Engelhorn
- Epilobium wilsonii Petrie
- Epilobium × winkleri A.Kern.
- Epilobium × wisconsinense Ugent – Wisconsin willowherb

=== Formerly placed here ===
- Stylidium tenellum (as E. tonkinense)

It is possible to distinguish between leaves of different Epilobium species using high-accuracy FT-IR method based on attenuated total reflection (ATR) without time-consuming preparation.

== Distribution and habitat ==
Epilobium has a cosmopolitan distribution.

== Conservation ==
Epilobium vernonicum and Epilobium psilotum are near threatened species.
