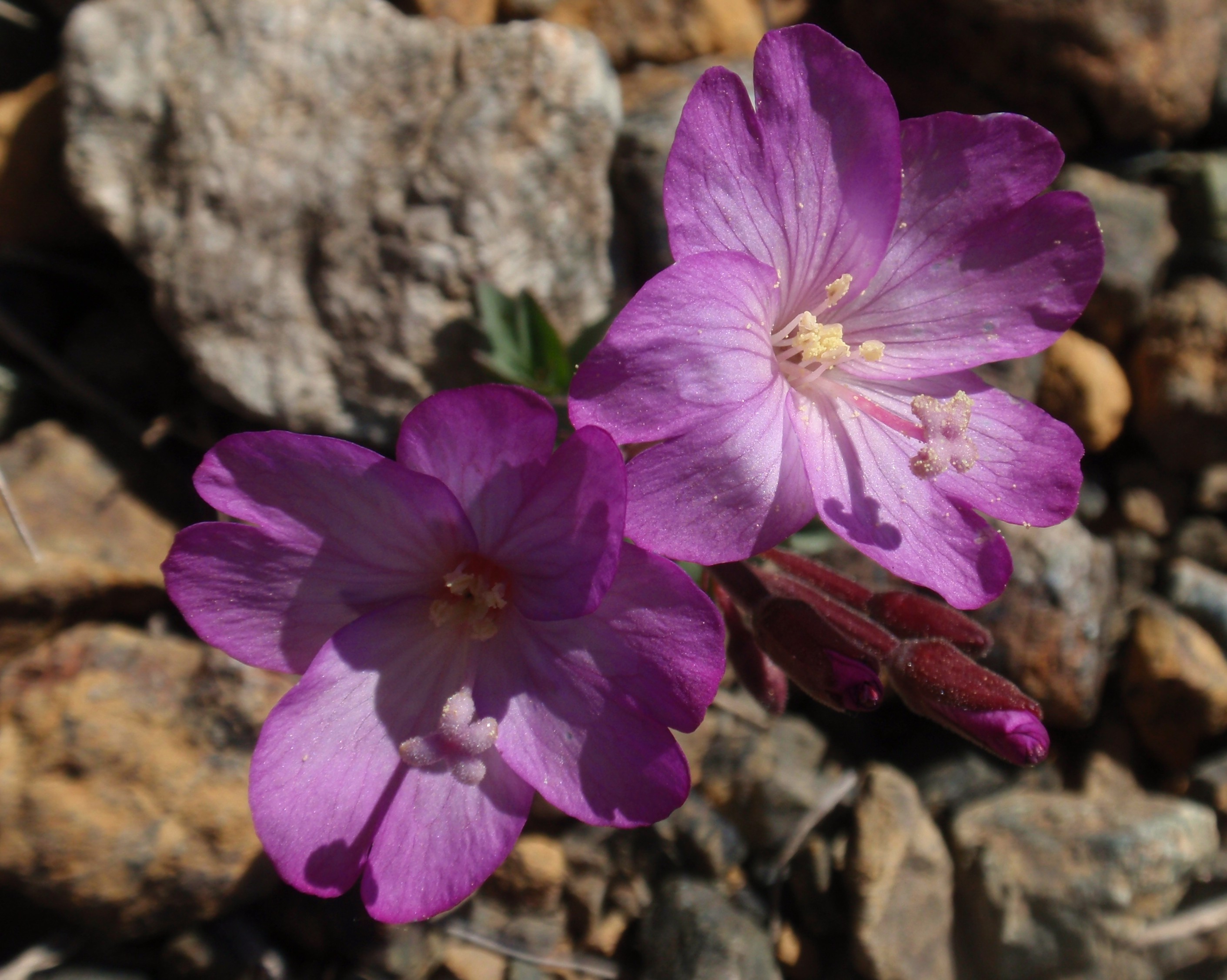

Scientific classification
- Kingdom: Plantae
- Clade: Embryophytes
- Clade: Tracheophytes
- Clade: Spermatophytes
- Clade: Angiosperms
- Clade: Eudicots
- Clade: Rosids
- Order: Myrtales
- Family: Onagraceae
- Genus: Epilobium
- Species: E. siskiyouense

Binomial name
- Epilobium siskiyouense (Munz) Hoch & P.H.Raven

= Epilobium siskiyouense =

Siskiyou willowherb

Species of flowering plant

Epilobium siskiyouense is a rare species of flowering plant in the evening primrose family known by the common names Siskiyou willowherb and Siskiyou fireweed (though it is not a true fireweed).

== Distribution ==
The plant is endemic to the Klamath Mountains of far northern California and southern Oregon. It grows in mountain habitats, including alpine talus and subalpine coniferous forest, often on serpentine soils.

== Description ==
Epilobium siskiyouense is a small, clumping subshrub growing scaly, often densely hairy and glandular from a woody caudex reaching up to about 25 centimeters (9.8 in) in maximum height. The leaves are lance-shaped to oval and under 3 centimeters long.

The glandular inflorescence bears bright to deep pink flowers with petals 1 or 2 centimeters long. The fruit is a hairy capsule reaching up to 4.5 centimeters (1.8 in) in length.
