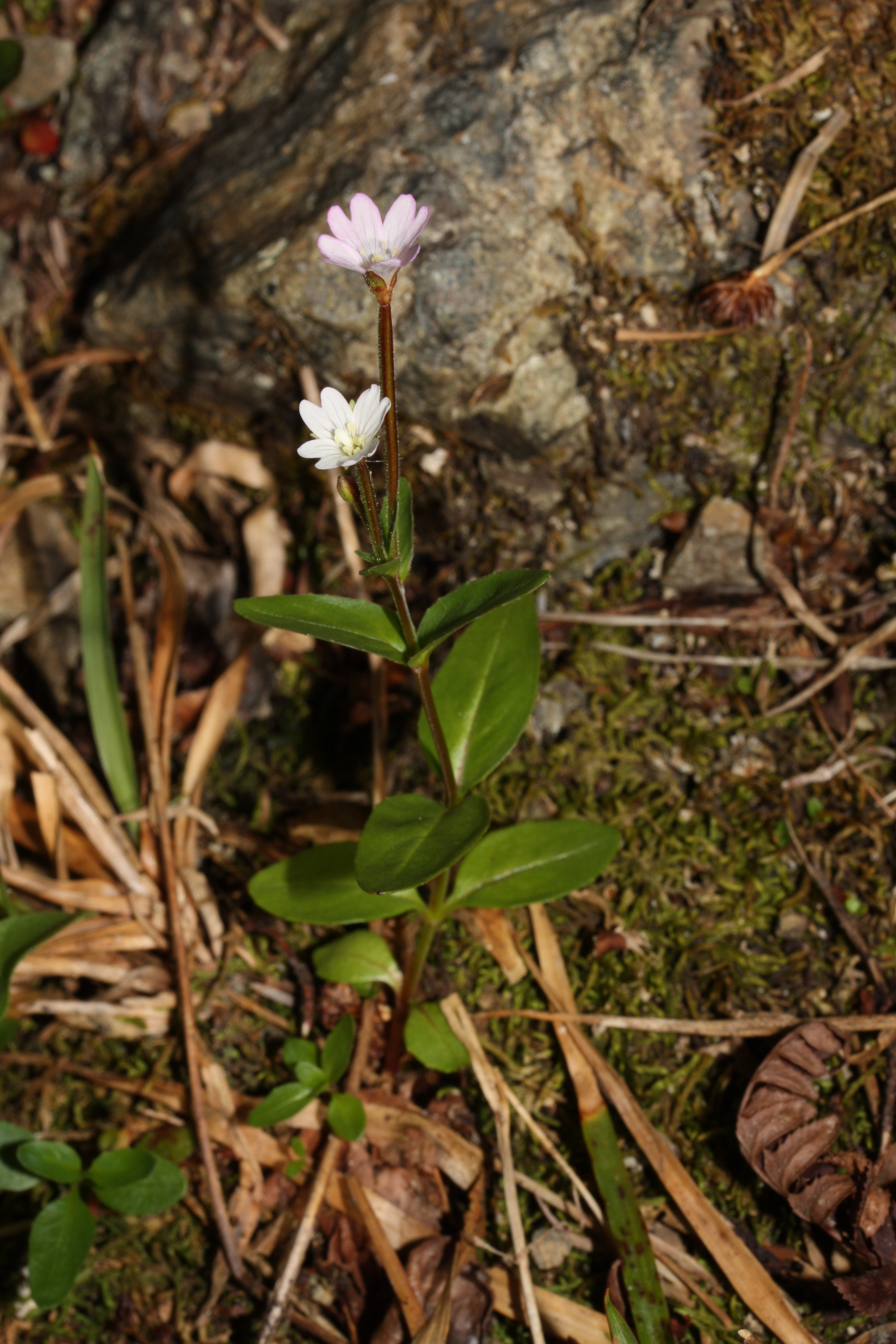
- Epilobium clavatum in Mount Baker-Snoqualmie National Forest

Conservation status
- Secure (NatureServe)

Scientific classification
- Kingdom: Plantae
- Clade: Tracheophytes
- Clade: Angiosperms
- Clade: Eudicots
- Clade: Rosids
- Order: Myrtales
- Family: Onagraceae
- Genus: Epilobium
- Species: E. clavatum

Binomial name
- Epilobium clavatum Trel.

Synonyms
- Epilobium alpinum var. clavatum (Trel.) C.L.Hitchc.

= Epilobium clavatum =

Plant species in the willowherb family

Epilobium clavatum is a species of flowering plant in the evening primrose family known by the common names talus willowherb and clavatefruit willowherb. It is native to western North America from Alaska to northern California to Colorado, where it grows in rocky high mountain habitat such as talus. It is a clumping perennial herb forming bristly mounds up to about 20 centimeters high and spreading outward via tough stolons. The oval-shaped leaves are 1 to 3 centimeters long. The inflorescence is an erect raceme of flowers, each with four small pink petals. The fruit is a capsule up to 4 centimeters long.
