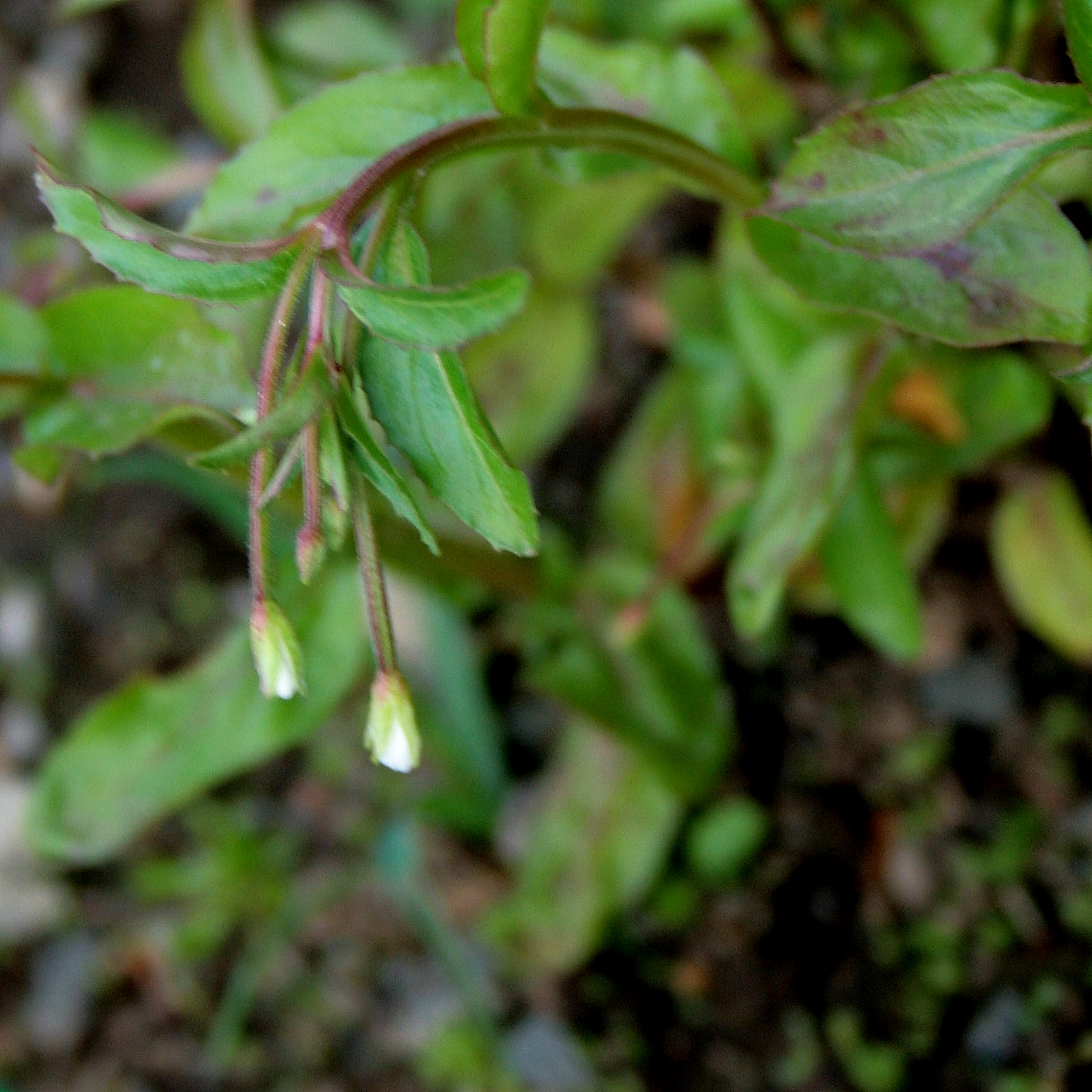

Conservation status
- Secure (NatureServe)

Scientific classification
- Kingdom: Plantae
- Clade: Tracheophytes
- Clade: Angiosperms
- Clade: Eudicots
- Clade: Rosids
- Order: Myrtales
- Family: Onagraceae
- Genus: Epilobium
- Species: E. lactiflorum

Binomial name
- Epilobium lactiflorum Hausskn.

Synonyms
- List: Epilobium alpinum f. lactiflorum (Hausskn.) A.H.Moore; Epilobium alpinum var. lactiflorum (Hausskn.) C.L.Hitchc.; Epilobium canadense H.Lév.; Epilobium canadense var. albescens H.Lév.; Epilobium hornemannii var. lactiflorum (Hausskn.) D.Löve; Epilobium shiroumense Matsum. & Nakai

= Epilobium lactiflorum =

Plant species in the willowherb family

Epilobium lactiflorum is a species of willowherb known by the common name milkflower willowherb or whiteflower willowherb. This plant is found throughout northern North America and northern Eurasia, where it most often grows in moist, rocky areas at some elevation. It is a hairy, clumping perennial with thin stems reaching 10 to 50 centimeters in height, and leafy stolons. The leaves are 2 to 5 centimeters long and have hairs along the edges and winged petioles. The tiny flowers are usually white, sometimes pink, and have notched petals 3 to 6 millimeters long. The fruit is a hairy capsule up to 10 centimeters in length.
