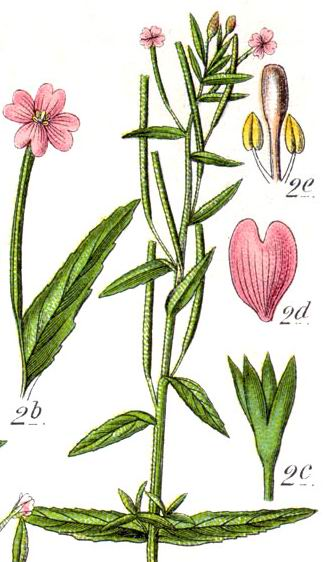

Scientific classification
- Kingdom: Plantae
- Clade: Tracheophytes
- Clade: Angiosperms
- Clade: Eudicots
- Clade: Rosids
- Order: Myrtales
- Family: Onagraceae
- Genus: Epilobium
- Species: E. obscurum

Binomial name
- Epilobium obscurum Schreb.

= Epilobium obscurum =

Species of flowering plant

Epilobium obscurum is a species of flowering plant belonging to the family Onagraceae.

Its native range is Macaronesia, Northwestern Africa, Europe to Turkey.

== Bibliography ==
- Strgulc Krajšek, Sumona; Šegedin, Tamara; Jogan, Nejc (2009-06-30). "Revision of Epilobium and Chamerion in the Croatian herbaria ZA and ZAHO". Natura Croatica. 18 (1): 155–167. eISSN 1848-7386.
