= Epilobium torreyi =

Scientific classification
- Kingdom: Plantae
- Clade: Embryophytes
- Clade: Tracheophytes
- Clade: Spermatophytes
- Clade: Angiosperms
- Clade: Eudicots
- Clade: Rosids
- Order: Myrtales
- Family: Onagraceae
- Genus: Epilobium
- Species: E. torreyi

Binomial name
- Epilobium torreyi (S.Wats.) Hoch & P.H.Raven

Synonyms
- Boisduvalia stricta

Species of flowering plant

Epilobium torreyi is a species of flowering plant in the evening primrose family known by the common names Torrey's willowherb and brook spike-primrose. It is native to western North America from British Columbia to California, where it grows in many types of habitat, often in moist areas. It is a hairy annual herb producing a narrow, upright stem often exceeding half a meter tall lined with narrow lance-shaped leaves. The hairy, glandular inflorescence bears tiny white or pink flowers. They are usually cleistogamous, remaining closed and self-pollinating. The fruit is a capsule up to about a centimeter long.
