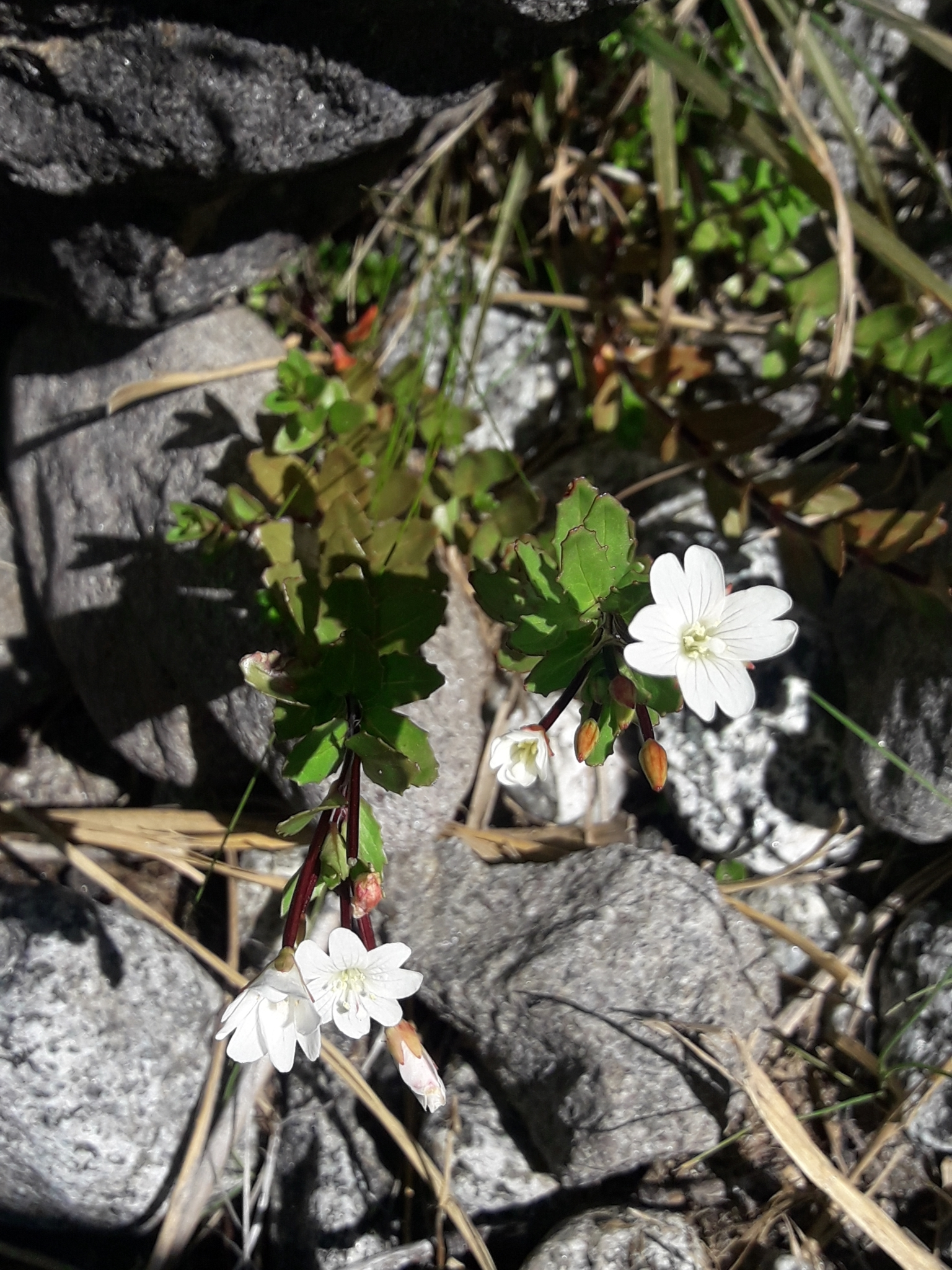
- Epilobium glabellum in Fiordland National Park

Conservation status
- Not Threatened (NZ TCS)

Scientific classification
- Kingdom: Plantae
- Clade: Tracheophytes
- Clade: Angiosperms
- Clade: Eudicots
- Clade: Rosids
- Order: Myrtales
- Family: Onagraceae
- Genus: Epilobium
- Species: E. glabellum

Binomial name
- Epilobium glabellum G.Forst.

= Epilobium glabellum =

Species of flowering plant

Epilobium glabellum, or willowherb, is a species of flowering plant, endemic to New Zealand.

== Description ==
Epilobium glabellum can grow as a small bush or in mats, with many stems coming from a single taproot. The stems themselves can be hairy, but the capsules and floral tubes are glabrous. The leaves are close-set and opposite along most of the stem, and sometimes overlapping, with tiny margins.

The flowers are white, purple or pink after pollination and appear from November to May. The seeds are anemochorous, meaning dispersed by the wind, possibly from sites as far as 50 km away.

== Distribution and habitat ==
Epilobium glabellum is known from the North and South Island. It can grow on stony ground at altitude near glaciers. They are early colonisers of screefields.

== Etymology ==
Glabellum is Latin for 'glabrous', meaning 'hairless'.

== Taxonomy ==
Epilobium glabellum has three distinct forms, which are thought to have evolved for specific habitat usage. These forms have at times led to multiple descriptions of E. glabellum.
