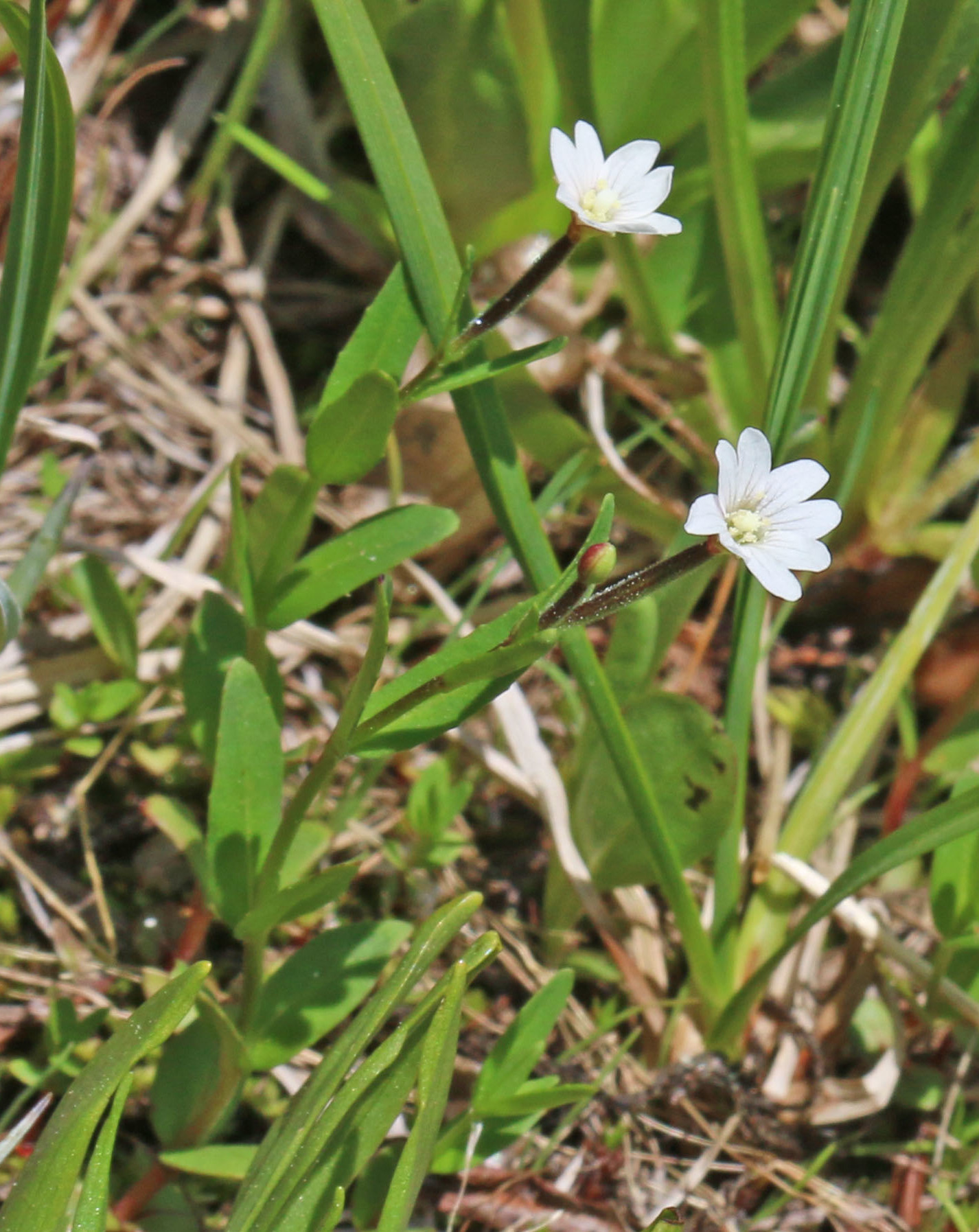

Conservation status
- Secure (NatureServe)

Scientific classification
- Kingdom: Plantae
- Clade: Tracheophytes
- Clade: Angiosperms
- Clade: Eudicots
- Clade: Rosids
- Order: Myrtales
- Family: Onagraceae
- Genus: Epilobium
- Species: E. oregonense

Binomial name
- Epilobium oregonense Hausskn.

Synonyms
- Epilobium alpinum var. gracillimum (Trel.) C.L.Hitchc.; Epilobium oregonense var. gracillimum Trel.

= Epilobium oregonense =

Plant species in the willowherb family

Epilobium oregonense is a species of flowering plant in the evening primrose family known by the common name Oregon willowherb. It is native to western North America from British Columbia to Arizona, where it generally grows in moist places in several types of habitat. It is a perennial herb growing spindly upright stems approaching 40 centimeters high or sometimes forming mats spreading via stolons. The small leaves are rounded near the base of the plant and linear in shape higher up the stem. The inflorescence bears flowers with four white to pink petals each a few millimeters long. The fruit is an elongated capsule up to 5 centimeters in length which is borne on a long pedicel that may be longer than the capsule itself.
