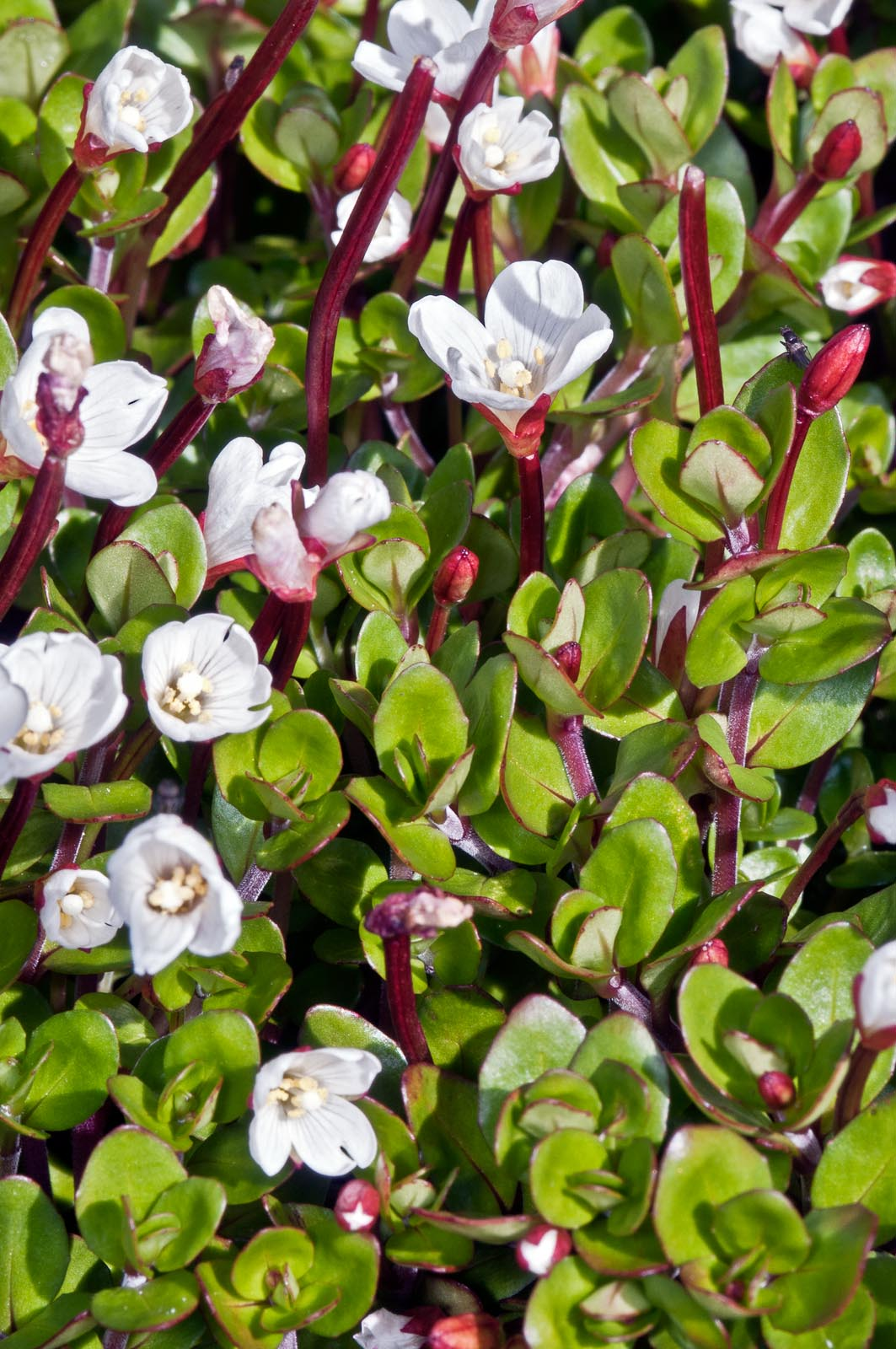
- Epilobium macropus in Tongariro

Conservation status
- Not Threatened (NZ TCS)

Scientific classification
- Kingdom: Plantae
- Clade: Embryophytes
- Clade: Tracheophytes
- Clade: Spermatophytes
- Clade: Angiosperms
- Clade: Eudicots
- Clade: Rosids
- Order: Myrtales
- Family: Onagraceae
- Genus: Epilobium
- Species: E. macropus

Binomial name
- Epilobium macropus Hook.

= Epilobium macropus =

Species of flowering plant

Epilobium macropus is a species of small flowering plant, endemic to New Zealand.

== Description ==
A small, mat-forming plant that grows in very wet environments. Small green ovate leaves, with white flowers, which are present from November to March.

The orange-brown coma can distinguish this Epilobium from others in New Zealand, except for the closely related Epilobium chionanthum. To distinguish from that plant, look for small hairs all over the stems, and opposite leaves on most of the plant except for an alternating pattern near the tips. Fruiting pedicels longer than 30 mm (1.2 in) are also distinctive.

== Distribution and habitat ==
Epilobium macropus grows on very wet surfaces, and floats on the water of moving streams in montane and alpine areas. It is known exclusively from both islands, although only montane regions in the North Island.

== Ecology ==
It is eaten by introduced ungulates (including possibly by chamois), as well as by brushtail possums.

== Etymology ==
Macropus means 'big foot.'
