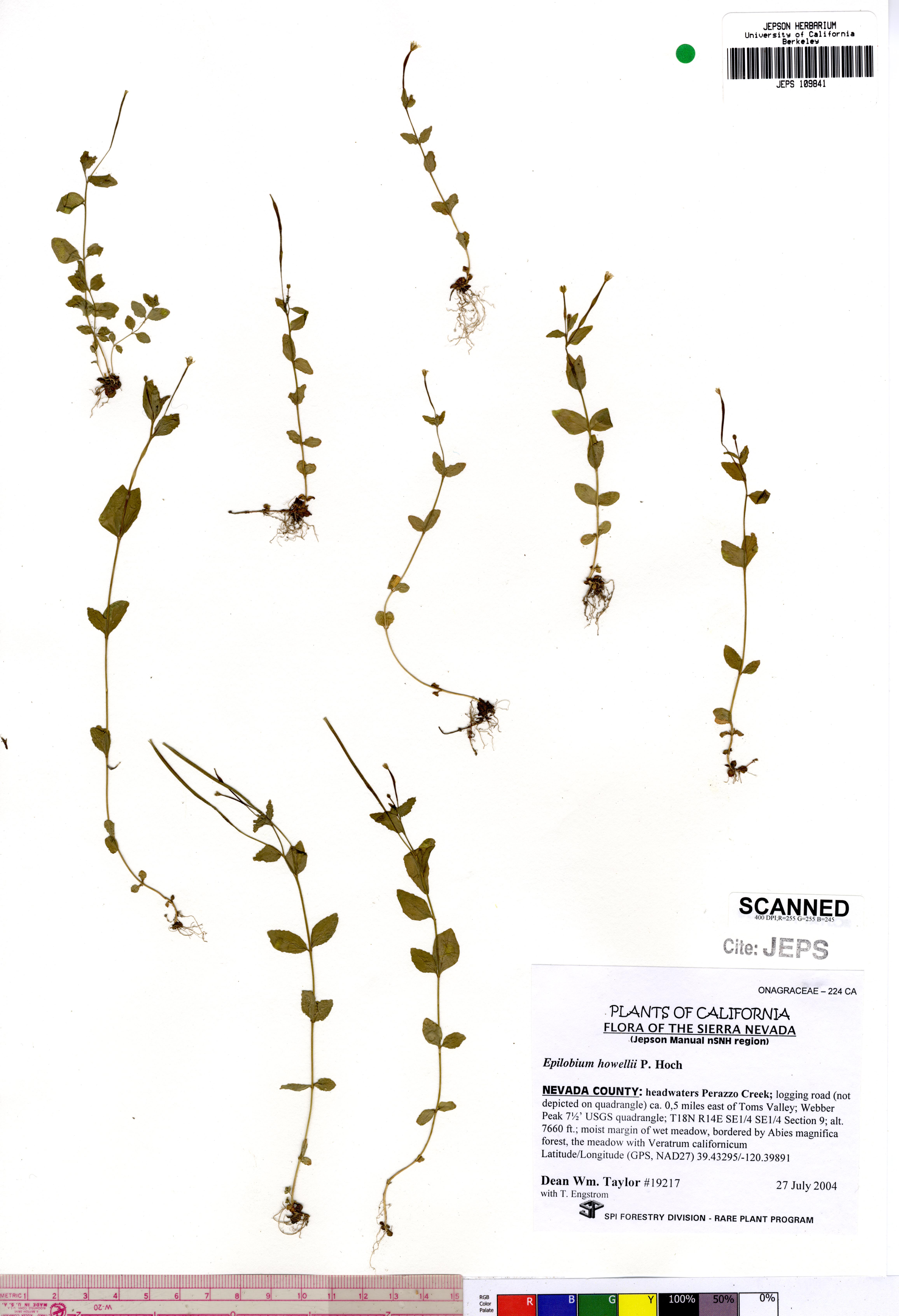

Scientific classification
- Kingdom: Plantae
- Clade: Embryophytes
- Clade: Tracheophytes
- Clade: Spermatophytes
- Clade: Angiosperms
- Clade: Eudicots
- Clade: Rosids
- Order: Myrtales
- Family: Onagraceae
- Genus: Epilobium
- Species: E. howellii

Binomial name
- Epilobium howellii Hoch

= Epilobium howellii =

Species of flowering plant

Epilobium howellii is an uncommon species of flowering plant in the evening primrose family known by the common names Yuba Pass willowherb and subalpine fireweed (though it is not a true fireweed). It is endemic to the High Sierra Nevada of California, where it is known from only about 65 occurrences.

It grows in wet mountain habitat such as meadows, often in the presence of mosses and willows, between 2,000 and 2,700 meters (6,600 and 8,900 ft) in elevation. The plant was first collected in 1975 at Yuba Pass on Highway 49 in Sierra County, California, and described to science as a new species in 1992.

This is a small, unobtrusive perennial herb forming clumps under 20 centimeters (7.9 in) tall, spreading out via tiny stolons. The thin stem is coated in glands and small leaves variable in shape from lance-shaped to rounded. The glandular inflorescence bears flowers with white petals 2 or 3 millimeters long. The fruit is an elongated capsule up to 4.5 centimeters in length. The main potential threat to this rare species is disruption of the soil in its habitat by activities such as grazing, trampling, and logging.
