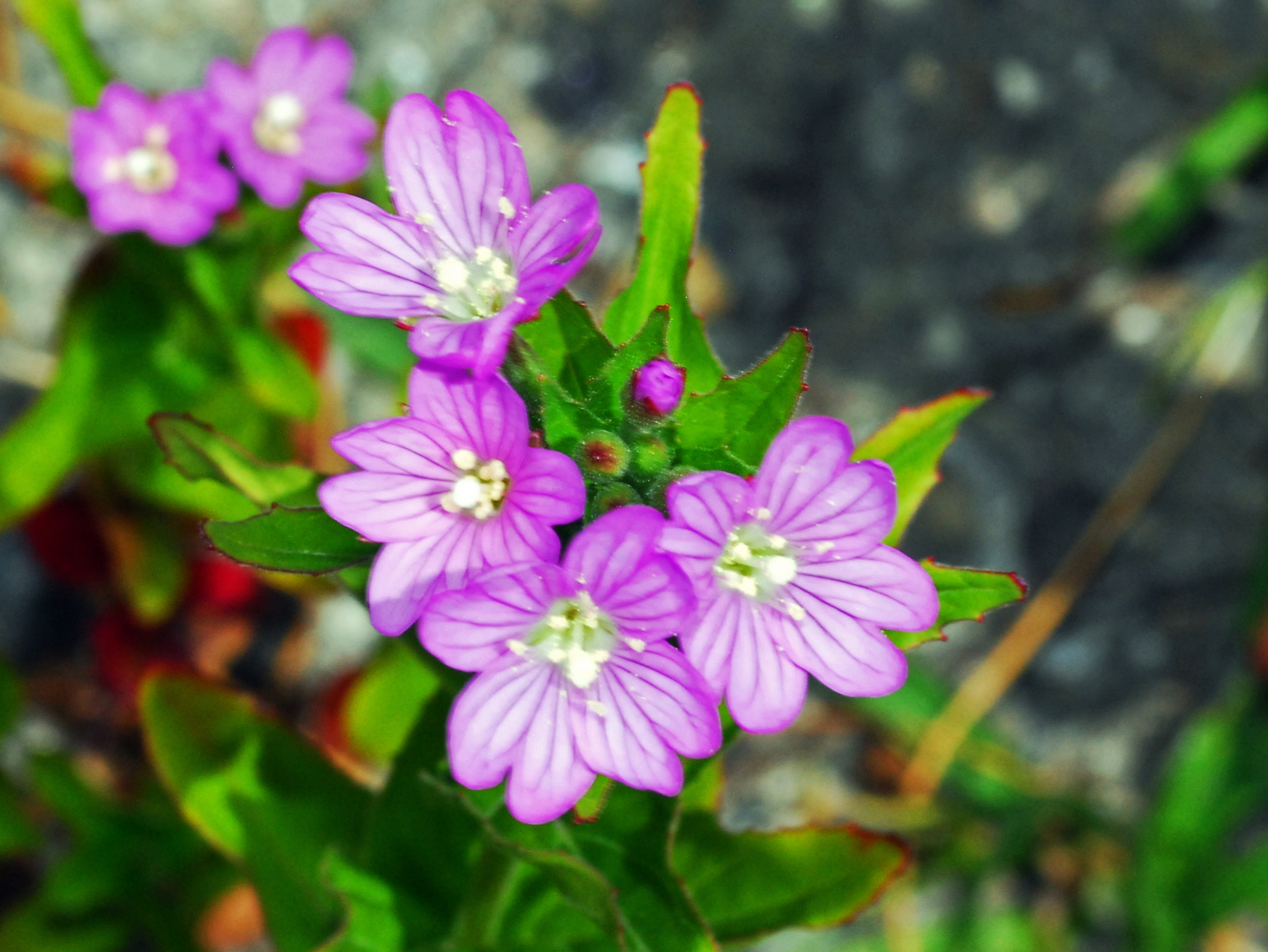
- Flowers of Epilobium alpestre at the Giardino Botanico Alpino Chanousia

Scientific classification
- Kingdom: Plantae
- Clade: Tracheophytes
- Clade: Angiosperms
- Clade: Eudicots
- Clade: Rosids
- Order: Myrtales
- Family: Onagraceae
- Genus: Epilobium
- Species: E. alpestre

Binomial name
- Epilobium alpestre (Jacq.) Krock.

= Epilobium alpestre =

Species of flowering plant

Epilobium alpestre is a species of willowherb in the family Onagraceae. It is native to Europe and Asia.

== Distribution and habitat ==
Epilobium alpestre is present in the Central and Southern Europe (mainly in the Alps) and in Western Asia. It occurs in high mountains at an elevation of 800–2,500 metres (2,600–8,200 ft) above sea level.

== Description ==
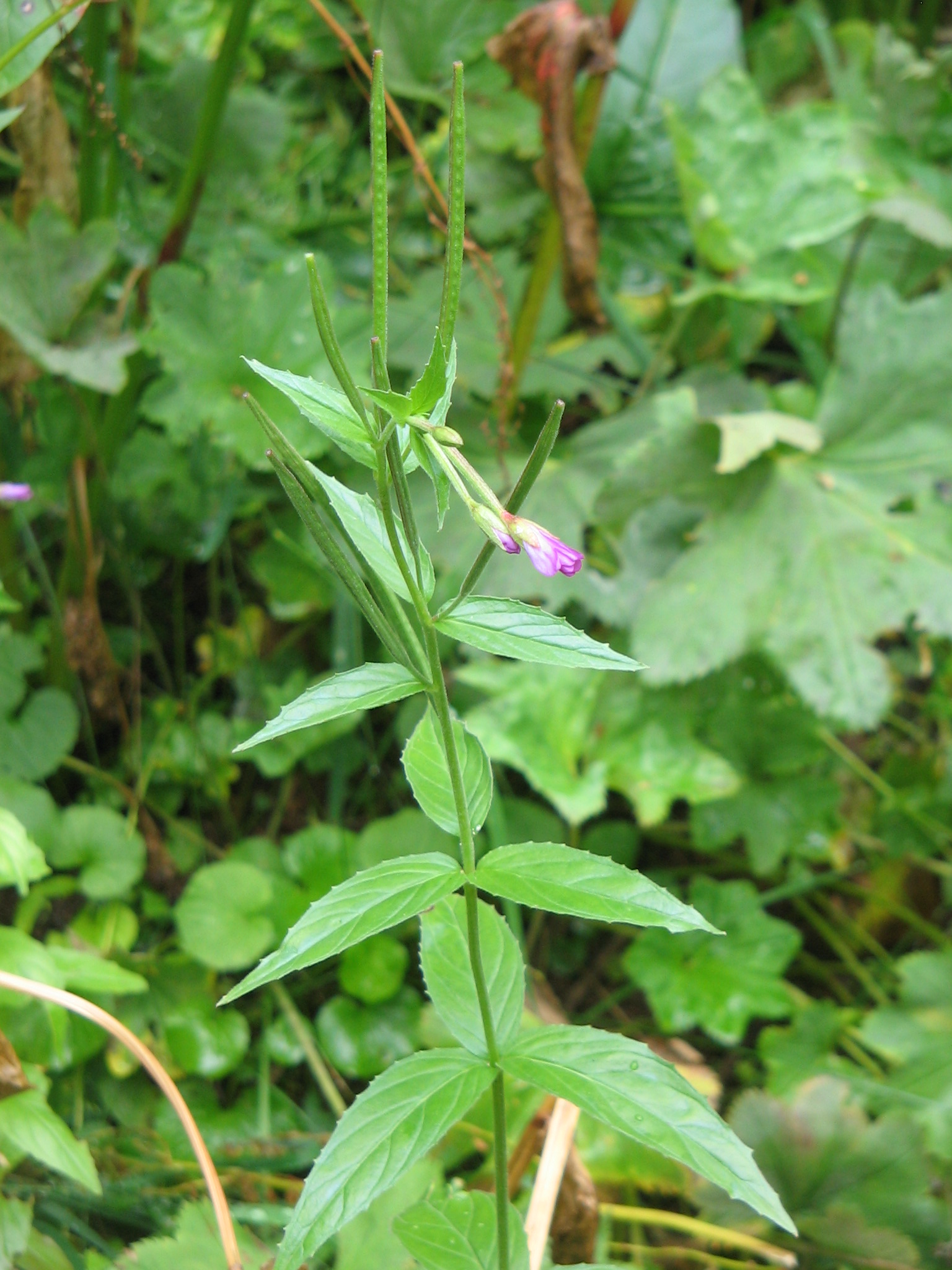
Leaves and fruits

Epilobium alpestre can reach a height of about 30–100 cm (12–39 in). It is a perennial herbaceous plant with a robust, erect and hollow stem. It has a short rhizome. Leaves are usually broadly lanceolate, acuminate at the apex and rounded at the base, with irregularly toothed margins, in whorls of 3 or 4. The Inflorescences are a simple, elongated. Flowers show four free acute sepals, shorter than the petals. They show a radial symmetry, 8 to 18 millimeters long and have a long tube. Corolla is pink, 1 to 1.5 cm wide, formed by four slightly indented petals and eight stamens.

Fruits consist of a long capsule opening with 4 valves. The seeds are around 1.8 millimeters long, spindle-shaped and narrowly narrowed at the bottom. Flowering time lasts from July to September.

== Bibliography ==
- Strgulc Krajšek, Sumona; Šegedin, Tamara; Jogan, Nejc (2009-06-30). "Revision of Epilobium and Chamerion in the Croatian herbaria ZA and ZAHO". Natura Croatica. 18 (1): 155–167. eISSN 1848-7386.
- T. G. Tutin, V. H. Heywood, N. A. Burges, D. M. Moore, D. H. Valentine, S. M. Walters, D. A. Webb (Eds.): Flora Europaea. Volume 2: Rosaceae to Umbelliferae. Cambridge University Press, Cambridge 1968, ISBN 0-521-06662-X, p. 310
