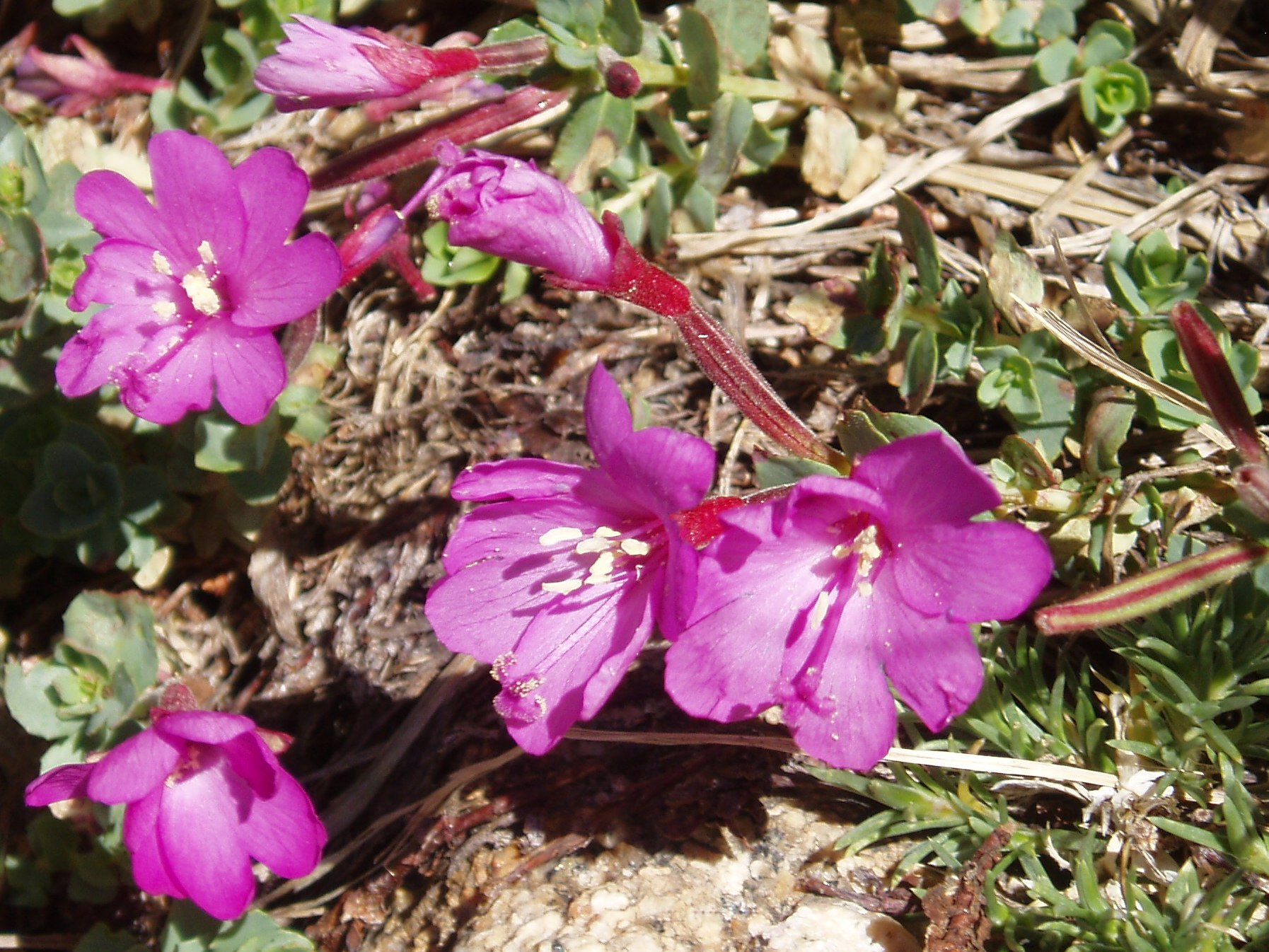

Scientific classification
- Kingdom: Plantae
- Clade: Embryophytes
- Clade: Tracheophytes
- Clade: Spermatophytes
- Clade: Angiosperms
- Clade: Eudicots
- Clade: Rosids
- Order: Myrtales
- Family: Onagraceae
- Genus: Epilobium
- Species: E. obcordatum

Binomial name
- Epilobium obcordatum A.Gray

= Epilobium obcordatum =

Species of flowering plant in the willowherb family

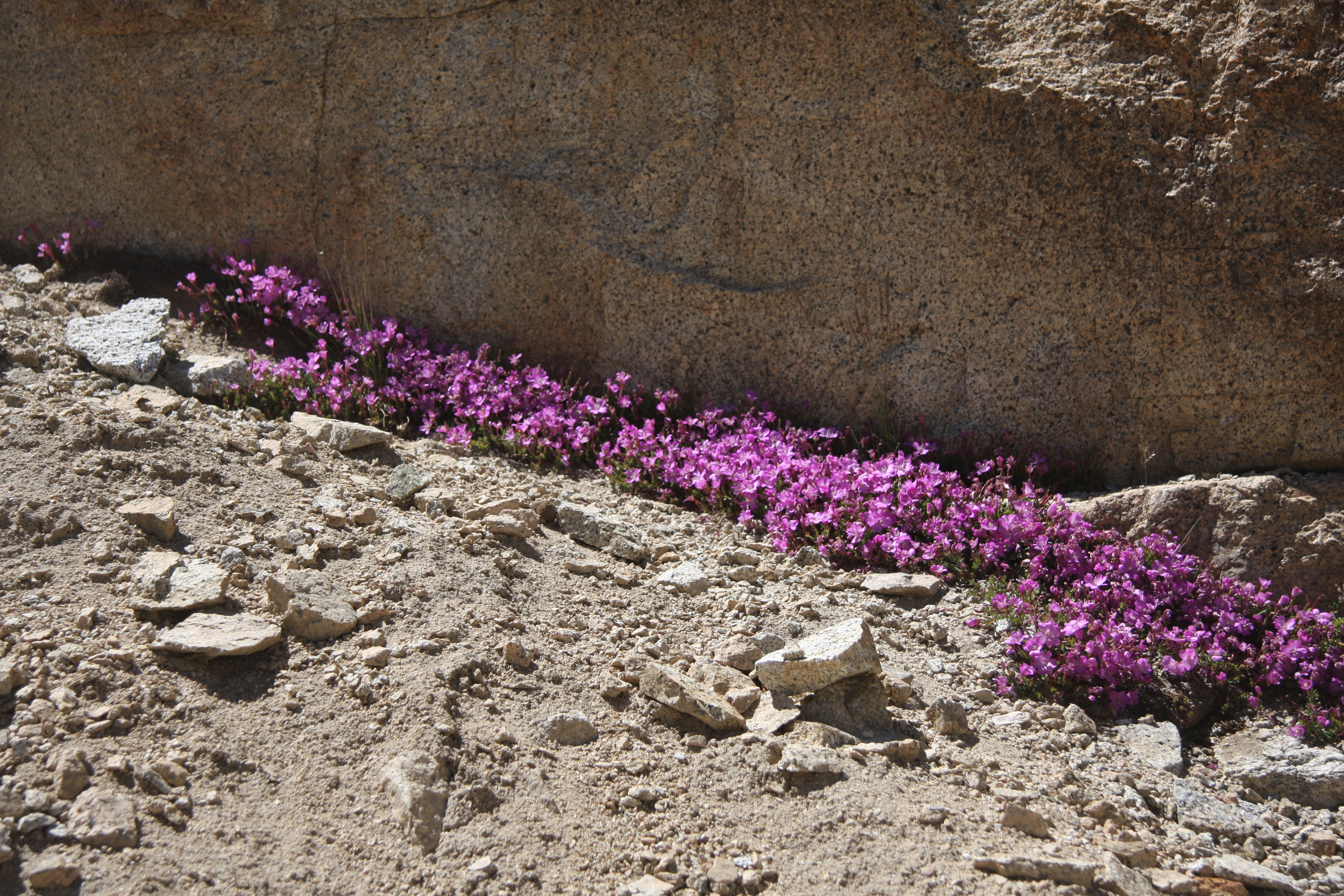
Rock fringe fringing granite, at 12,400 ft (3,800 m) near Forester Pass

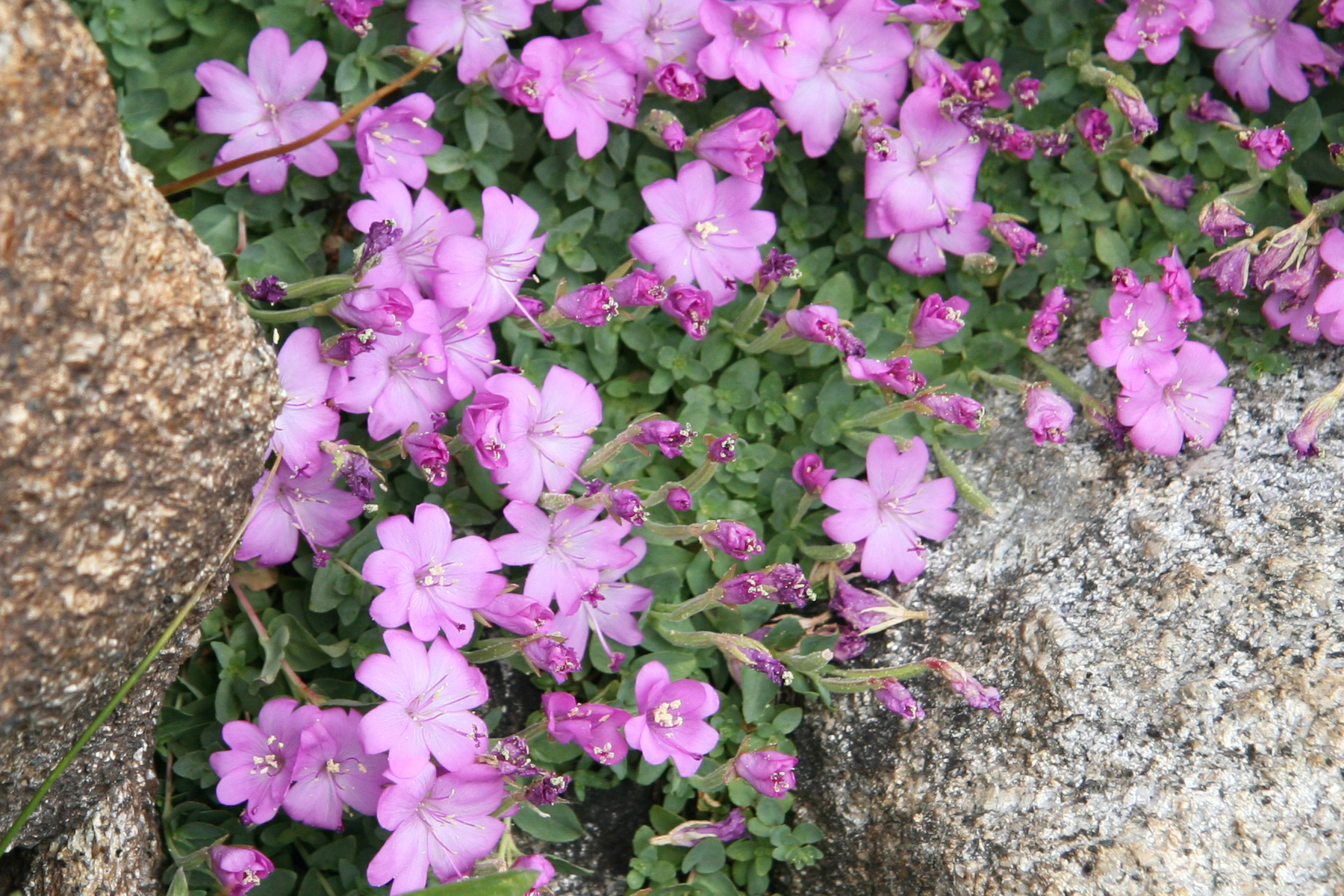
E. obcordatum: flowers with 4 heart-shaped petals and small oval leaves

Epilobium obcordatum is a species of perennial plant in the evening-primrose family (Onagraceae), known by the common name rockfringe willowherb and rock fringe. It is native to the western United States from California to Idaho, where it is found in rocky mountainous areas, at altitudes of 7,000 ft (2,100 m) to 13,000 ft (4,000 m). This small perennial is clumpy to mat-forming and spreads from a woody caudex, especially in nooks between rocks. It has stems lined with oval or rounded leaves which spread parallel to the ground or ascend somewhat. At the tips of the thin stems are flowers each with four petals. The petals are magenta to purple, rounded and notched, often in a perfect heart shape, and are one or two centimeters long. The glandular, club-like, ridged fruit is a capsule two to four centimeters long growing on a short stalk.
