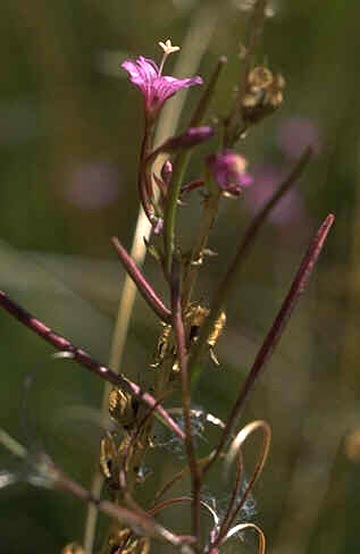

Conservation status
- Imperiled (NatureServe)

Scientific classification
- Kingdom: Plantae
- Clade: Embryophytes
- Clade: Tracheophytes
- Clade: Spermatophytes
- Clade: Angiosperms
- Clade: Eudicots
- Clade: Rosids
- Order: Myrtales
- Family: Onagraceae
- Genus: Epilobium
- Species: E. oreganum

Binomial name
- Epilobium oreganum Greene

Synonyms
- Epilobium exaltatum

= Epilobium oreganum =

Species of flowering plant in the willowherb family

Epilobium oreganum is an uncommon species of flowering plant in the evening primrose family known by the common names Grants Pass willowherb and Oregon fireweed (though it is not a true fireweed). It is native to southern Oregon and northern California, where it is historically known mostly from the Klamath Mountains. It is currently confirmed to exist only in Josephine County, Oregon, and Trinity County, California, where it grows in boggy areas on serpentine soils. It is a perennial herb growing up to a meter in height with thin, hairless stems. The red-veined leaves are oval to lance-shaped and up to 9 centimeters (3.5 in) long. The inflorescence bears flowers with pink petals just over a centimeter long and a protruding pistil. The fruit is a hairy, glandular capsule up to 4.5 centimeters (1.8 in) long.
