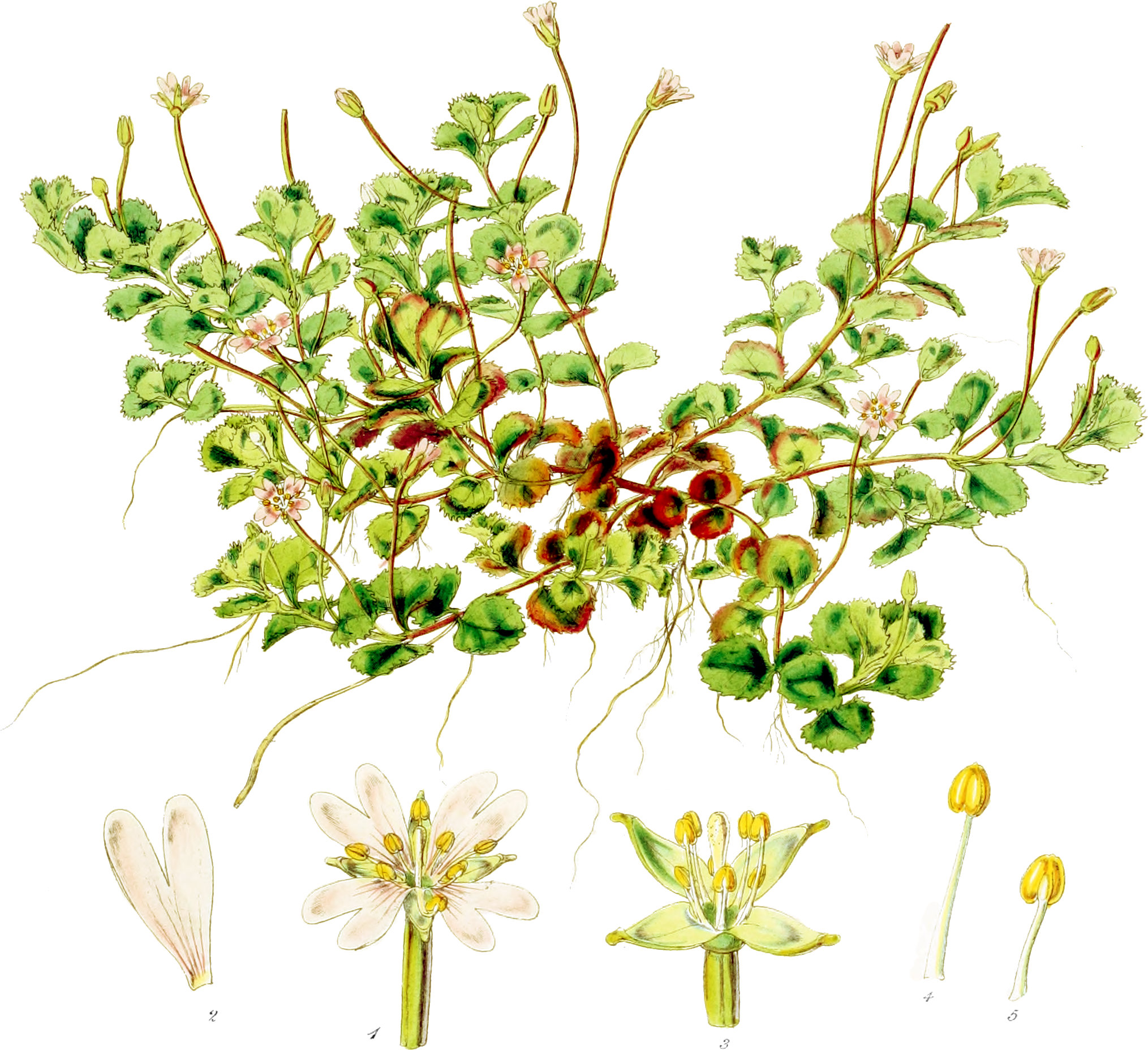
- As E. linnaeoides (Plate VI)

Scientific classification
- Kingdom: Plantae
- Clade: Embryophytes
- Clade: Tracheophytes
- Clade: Spermatophytes
- Clade: Angiosperms
- Clade: Eudicots
- Clade: Rosids
- Order: Myrtales
- Family: Onagraceae
- Genus: Epilobium
- Species: E. pedunculare

Binomial name
- Epilobium pedunculare A.Cunn.

Synonyms
- Epilobium linnaeoides Hook.f. Epilobium arnottianum Gillies ex Hook. Epilobium caespitosum Hausskn. Epilobium longipes Hausskn.

= Epilobium pedunculare =

Species of flowering plant in the willowherb family

Epilobium pedunculare (E. linnaeoides), the rockery willowherb, is a species of Epilobium similar to E. brunnescens. It is found on the Antipodean Islands, Chatham Island, Macquarie Island, and both the North and South Island of New Zealand.

== Description ==
With leaves tooth 4 to 9 mm.

== Distribution ==
A native of New Zealand, the species has now naturalized in Ireland.
