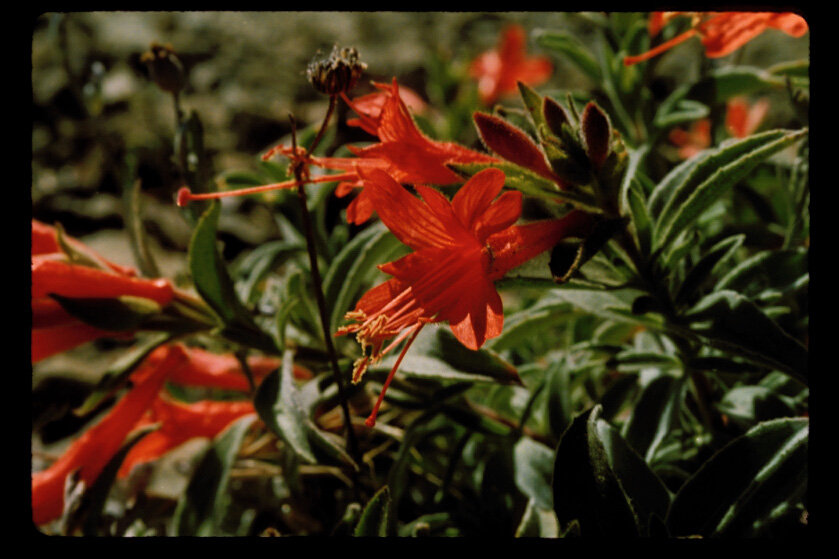

Scientific classification
- Kingdom: Plantae
- Clade: Embryophytes
- Clade: Tracheophytes
- Clade: Spermatophytes
- Clade: Angiosperms
- Clade: Eudicots
- Clade: Rosids
- Order: Myrtales
- Family: Onagraceae
- Genus: Epilobium
- Species: E. septentrionale

Binomial name
- Epilobium septentrionale (D.D.Keck) R.N.Bowman & Hoch

Synonyms
- Zauschneria septentrionalis

= Epilobium septentrionale =

Species of flowering plant

Epilobium septentrionale, with the common names Humboldt County fuchsia and northern willowherb, is a species of willowherb. Like the wildflower zauschneria, this plant was once treated as a member of genus Zauschneria but has more recently been placed with the willowherbs.

== Distribution ==
This species is endemic to Northern California, where it is an uncommon resident of the rocky ledges of the Northern Outer California Coast Ranges.

== Description ==
Epilobium septentrionale is a squat, clumpy perennial growing in thin patches of soil between rocks and sending up a few erect stems. The leaves are oval and pointed, glandular, and covered in a coat of white fuzz.

At the end of each erect branch is a glandular inflorescence bearing a bright red-orange tubular flower 2 or 3 centimeters long. A bunch of stamens and one long pistil protrude obviously from the mouth of the bloom, which is pollinated by nectar-feeding birds. The fruit is a hairy capsule about two centimeters long.
