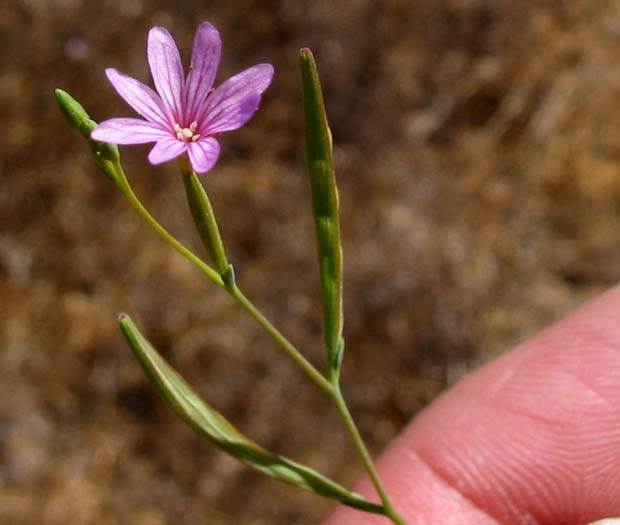

Conservation status
- Secure (NatureServe)

Scientific classification
- Kingdom: Plantae
- Clade: Tracheophytes
- Clade: Angiosperms
- Clade: Eudicots
- Clade: Rosids
- Order: Myrtales
- Family: Onagraceae
- Genus: Epilobium
- Species: E. brachycarpum

Binomial name
- Epilobium brachycarpum C.Presl

Synonyms
- List: Epilobium adenocladum (Hausskn.) Rydb.; Epilobium altissimum Suksd.; Epilobium apricum Suksd.; Epilobium fasciculatum Suksd.; Epilobium hammondii Howell; Epilobium jucundum A.Gray; Epilobium jucundum var. viridifolium Suksd.; Epilobium laevicaule Rydb.; Epilobium mexicanum Schltdl.; Epilobium micranthum Nutt. ex Hausskn.; Epilobium paniculatum Nutt. ex Torr. & A.Gray; Epilobium subulatum (Hausskn.) Rydb.; Epilobium tracyi Rydb.

= Epilobium brachycarpum =

Plant species in the willowherb family

Epilobium brachycarpum is a species of willowherb known by the common names tall willowherb, tall annual willowherb, panicled willowherb and tall fireweed. It is native to North America, including Canada from Quebec to British Columbia, the western United States and the Dakotas, and southwestern and Central Mexico. It is a resident of varied open and woodland habitats. It has also been introduced to some areas in South America. This is a tall glandular, hairy annual herb occasionally reaching 2 metres (6 ft 7 in) in height. It is somewhat gangly and thin like an erect weed, with narrow, curving, pointed leaves up to a few centimetres in length. The flower has four petals which may be so deeply notched that they look like four pairs. They are generally light purple or pink, with darker veining. The fruit is a capsule 1 to 3 centimetres (0.39 to 1.18 in) long.
