= Epilobium cleistogamum =

Scientific classification
- Kingdom: Plantae
- Clade: Embryophytes
- Clade: Tracheophytes
- Clade: Spermatophytes
- Clade: Angiosperms
- Clade: Eudicots
- Clade: Rosids
- Order: Myrtales
- Family: Onagraceae
- Genus: Epilobium
- Species: E. cleistogamum

Binomial name
- Epilobium cleistogamum (Curran) Hoch & P. H. Raven

Synonyms
- Boisduvalia cleistogama

Species of flowering plant

Epilobium cleistogamum is a species of willowherb known by the common name selfing willowherb. This plant is endemic to central California where it is a resident of vernal pools and mudflats. It is a small annual plant with fuzzy pointed green leaves. Some of the leaves have hairs which are knobby and gland-tipped. The flowers are usually cleistogamous, that is, they self-pollinate without opening. Some of the flowers do open to reveal pinkish-purple to nearly white, deeply notched petals. The fruit is a tough four-sided capsule about a centimeter long.
