= Epilobium pallidum =

Scientific classification
- Kingdom: Plantae
- Clade: Embryophytes
- Clade: Tracheophytes
- Clade: Spermatophytes
- Clade: Angiosperms
- Clade: Eudicots
- Clade: Rosids
- Order: Myrtales
- Family: Onagraceae
- Genus: Epilobium
- Species: E. pallidum

Binomial name
- Epilobium pallidum (Eastw.) Hoch & P.H.Raven

Synonyms
- Boisduvalia macrantha Boisduvalia pallida

Species of flowering plant in the willowherb family

Epilobium pallidum is a species of flowering plant in the evening primrose family known by the common name largeflower spike-primrose. It is native to western United States, where it grows in moist areas in northern California, Oregon, and Idaho. It is an annual herb producing a narrow, upright stem up to 60 centimeters (24 in) long lined with narrow oval leaves each up to 5 centimeters in length. The inflorescence atop the stem bears several flowers and hairy, leaflike bracts. Each flower has four bilobed petals each up to about a centimeter long and bright pink in color. The fruit is a beaked capsule between 1 and 2 centimeters long containing a row of tiny seeds.
