= Epilobium rigidum =

Stiff willowherb

Scientific classification
- Kingdom: Plantae
- Clade: Embryophytes
- Clade: Tracheophytes
- Clade: Spermatophytes
- Clade: Angiosperms
- Clade: Eudicots
- Clade: Rosids
- Order: Myrtales
- Family: Onagraceae
- Genus: Epilobium
- Species: E. rigidum

Binomial name
- Epilobium rigidum Hausskn.

Species of flowering plant

Epilobium rigidum is an uncommon species of flowering plant in the evening primrose family known by the common names stiff willowherb and Siskiyou Mountains willowherb.

It is endemic to the Klamath Mountains of far northern California and southern Oregon, where it grows in dry, open areas in lower elevation coniferous forest habitat, often on serpentine soils.

This is a perennial herb forming upright clumps or mats of tough, peeling stems around a woody caudex. It bears bright pink flowers with heart-shaped petals up to 2 centimeters long flanked by pointed reddish sepals. The fruit is a hairy capsule up to 3.5 centimeters long.
