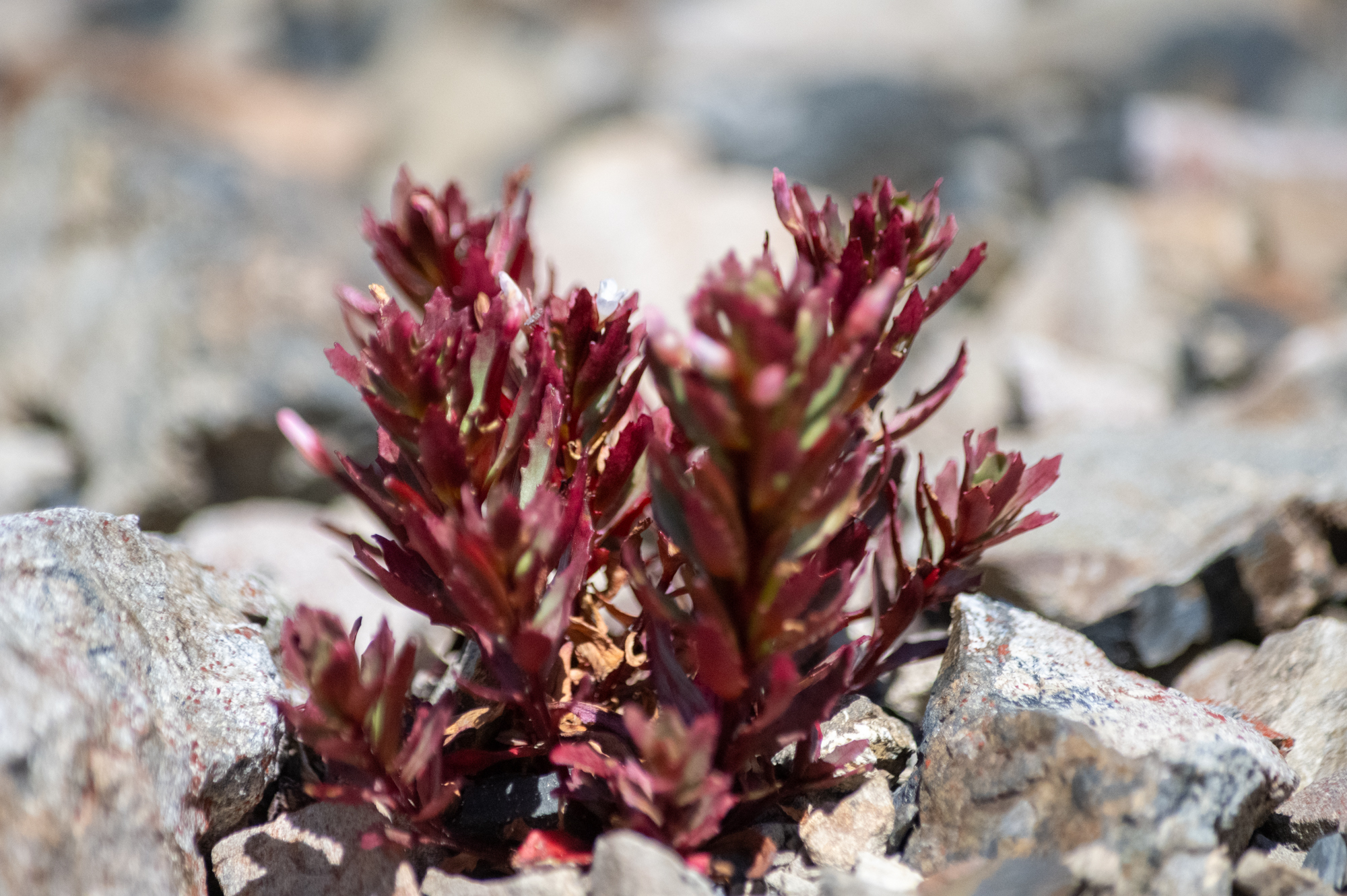
- Epilobium pycnostachyum in Nelson Lakes National Park

Conservation status
- Not Threatened (NZ TCS)

Scientific classification
- Kingdom: Plantae
- Clade: Embryophytes
- Clade: Tracheophytes
- Clade: Spermatophytes
- Clade: Angiosperms
- Clade: Eudicots
- Clade: Rosids
- Order: Myrtales
- Family: Onagraceae
- Genus: Epilobium
- Species: E. pycnostachyum

Binomial name
- Epilobium pycnostachyum Hausskn.

= Epilobium pycnostachyum =

Species of flowering plant

Epilobium pycnostachyum, or scree epilobium, is a species of willowherb that is endemic to New Zealand. It grows exclusively on scree slopes on mountains.

== Description ==
A small herb with a few branches that spread out and then up. The leaves are a dull green, and glabrous and have deep teeth on the margins. The flowers are white, or red and pink.

The seeds are wind-dispersed.

== Range and habitat ==
Epilobium pycnostachyum is known from both the North and the South Island. It is restricted to mountain ranges, where it grows in scree fields and unstable, rocky environments.

It is not considered threatened.

== Etymology ==
Pycnostachyum means 'densely spiked'.

== Taxonomy ==
It was described by Heinrich Carl Haussknecht in 1879. The type specimen is from Whitcombe's Pass, on the South Island of New Zealand.
