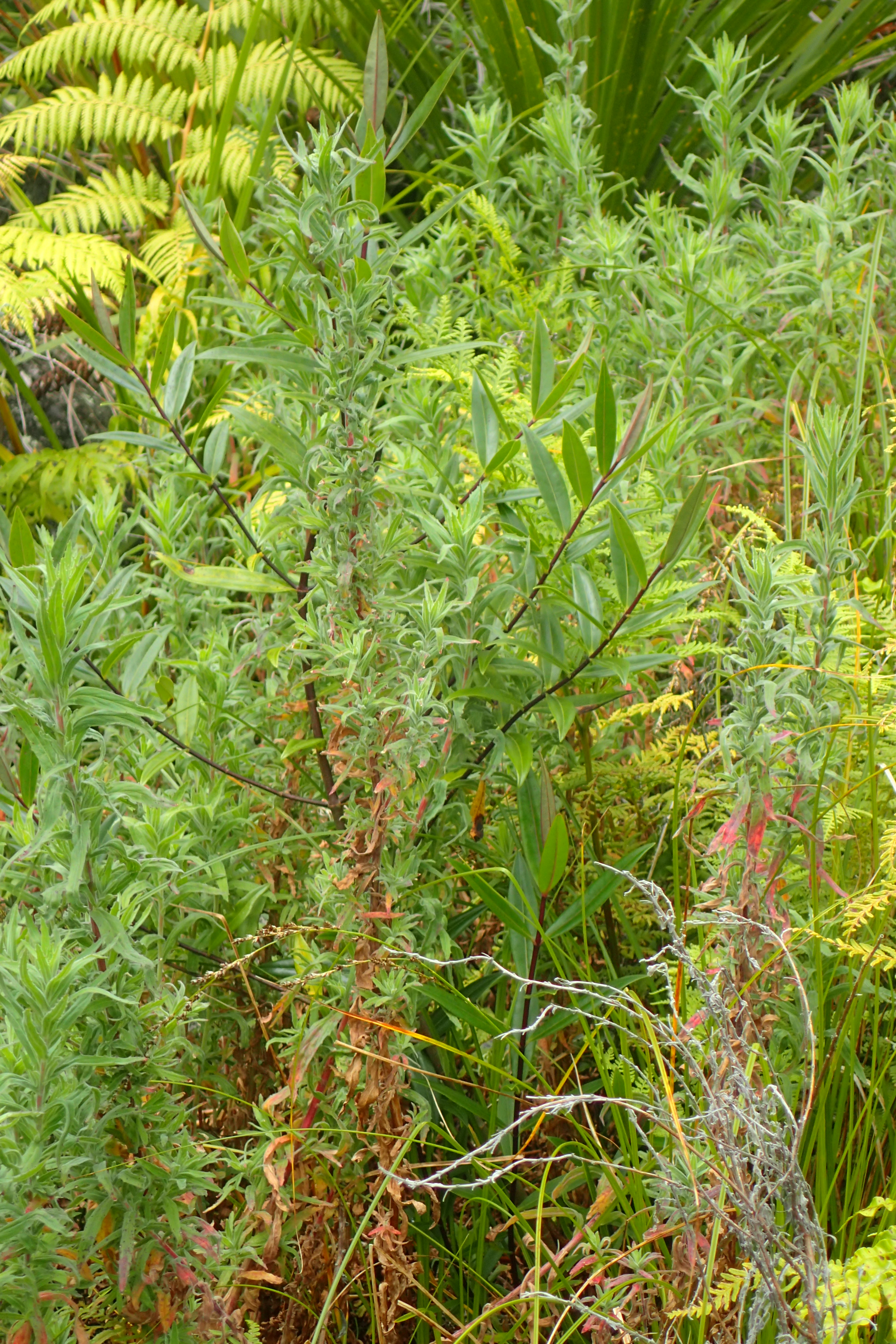

Scientific classification
- Kingdom: Plantae
- Clade: Embryophytes
- Clade: Tracheophytes
- Clade: Spermatophytes
- Clade: Angiosperms
- Clade: Eudicots
- Clade: Rosids
- Order: Myrtales
- Family: Onagraceae
- Genus: Epilobium
- Species: E. hirtigerum

Binomial name
- Epilobium hirtigerum A.Cunn.

= Epilobium hirtigerum =

Species of flowering plant in the willowherb family

Epilobium hirtigerum, commonly known as the hairy willow herb, is a species in the family Onagraceae. The flowers are described as purplish or red/pink, white.

It is found in Australia, Indonesia, New Zealand, including the Chatham Islands, and South America.

In Australia, it is found in New South Wales, Queensland, South Australia, Tasmania, Victoria, and Western Australia. In New South Wales, it is widespread in moist and often weedy places. In Western Australia, it is endemic and found in the South West, Wheatbelt and Peel regions.
