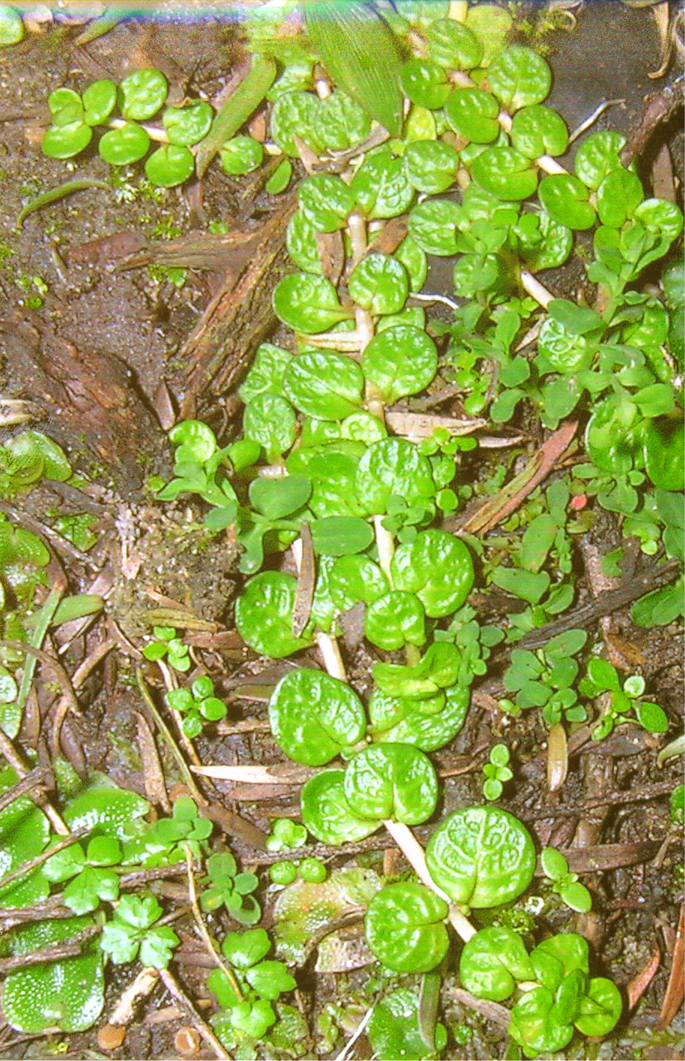

Scientific classification
- Kingdom: Plantae
- Clade: Tracheophytes
- Clade: Angiosperms
- Clade: Eudicots
- Clade: Rosids
- Order: Myrtales
- Family: Onagraceae
- Genus: Epilobium
- Species: E. komarovianum

Binomial name
- Epilobium komarovianum H.Lév

= Epilobium komarovianum =

Species of plant

Epilobium komarovianum, or creeping willowherb, is a species of flowering plant endemic to New Zealand.

== Description ==
Epilobium komarovianum grows in creeping mats, and has rounded leaves patterned with ridges.

== Taxonomy ==
The species has previously been known as E. nerterioides and E. ornatum.

== Distribution and habitat ==
Epilobium komarovianum is endemic to New Zealand, and can be found throughout the North, South, and Chatham Islands. It grows on open damp ground.

It has been naturalised in Great Britain, Ireland, other parts of Europe, and the United States.
