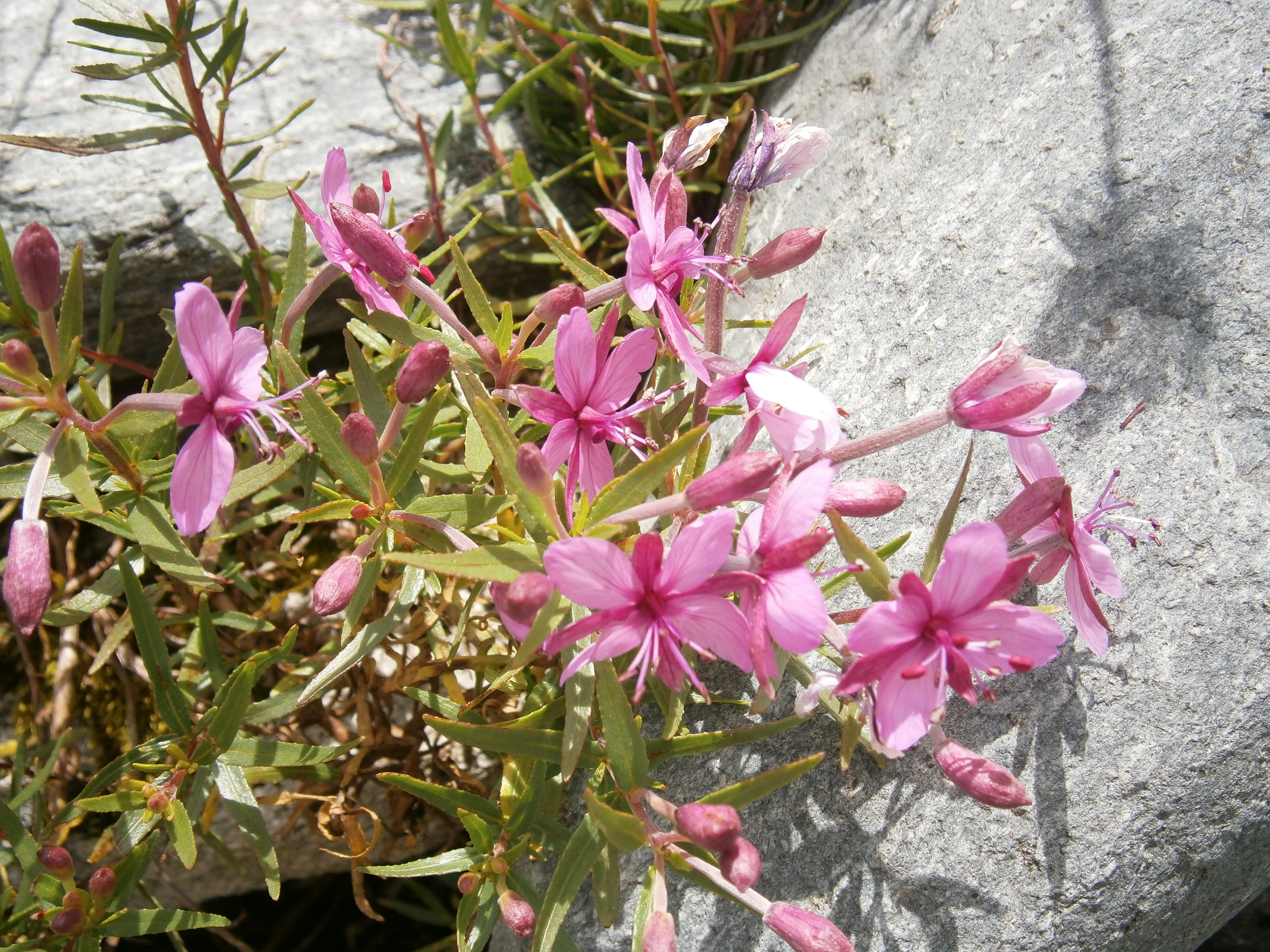
- Flowers of Chamaenerion fleischeri

Scientific classification
- Kingdom: Plantae
- Clade: Embryophytes
- Clade: Tracheophytes
- Clade: Angiosperms
- Clade: Eudicots
- Clade: Rosids
- Order: Myrtales
- Family: Onagraceae
- Genus: Chamaenerion
- Species: C. fleischeri

Binomial name
- Chamaenerion fleischeri ( Hochst.) Fritsch

Synonyms
- List: Chamaenerion denticulatum Schur nom. illeg.; Chamerion fleischeri; Epilobium crassifolium Lehm.; Epilobium denticulatum Wenderoth; Epilobium dodonaei f. stenophyllum Haussknecht; Epilobium dodonaei f. platyphyllum Haussknecht; Epilobium dodonaei proles fleischeri (Hochst.) Rouy & E.G.Camus; Epilobium dodonaei proles fleischeri var. platyphyllum (Hausskn.) Rouy & E.G.Camus; Epilobium dodonaei proles fleischeri var. stenophyllum (Hausskn.) Rouy & E.G.Camus; Epilobium dodonaei subsp. fleischeri (Hochst.) Schinz & Thell.; Epilobium fleischeri Hochst.; Epilobium rosmarinifolium subsp. fleischeri (Hochst.) Bonnier & Layens

= Chamaenerion fleischeri =

Species of flowering plant in the willowherb family

Chamaenerion fleischeri, formerly Epilobium fleischeri, commonly known as Alpine willowherb, is a herbaceous perennial plant of the family Onagraceae.

== Description ==
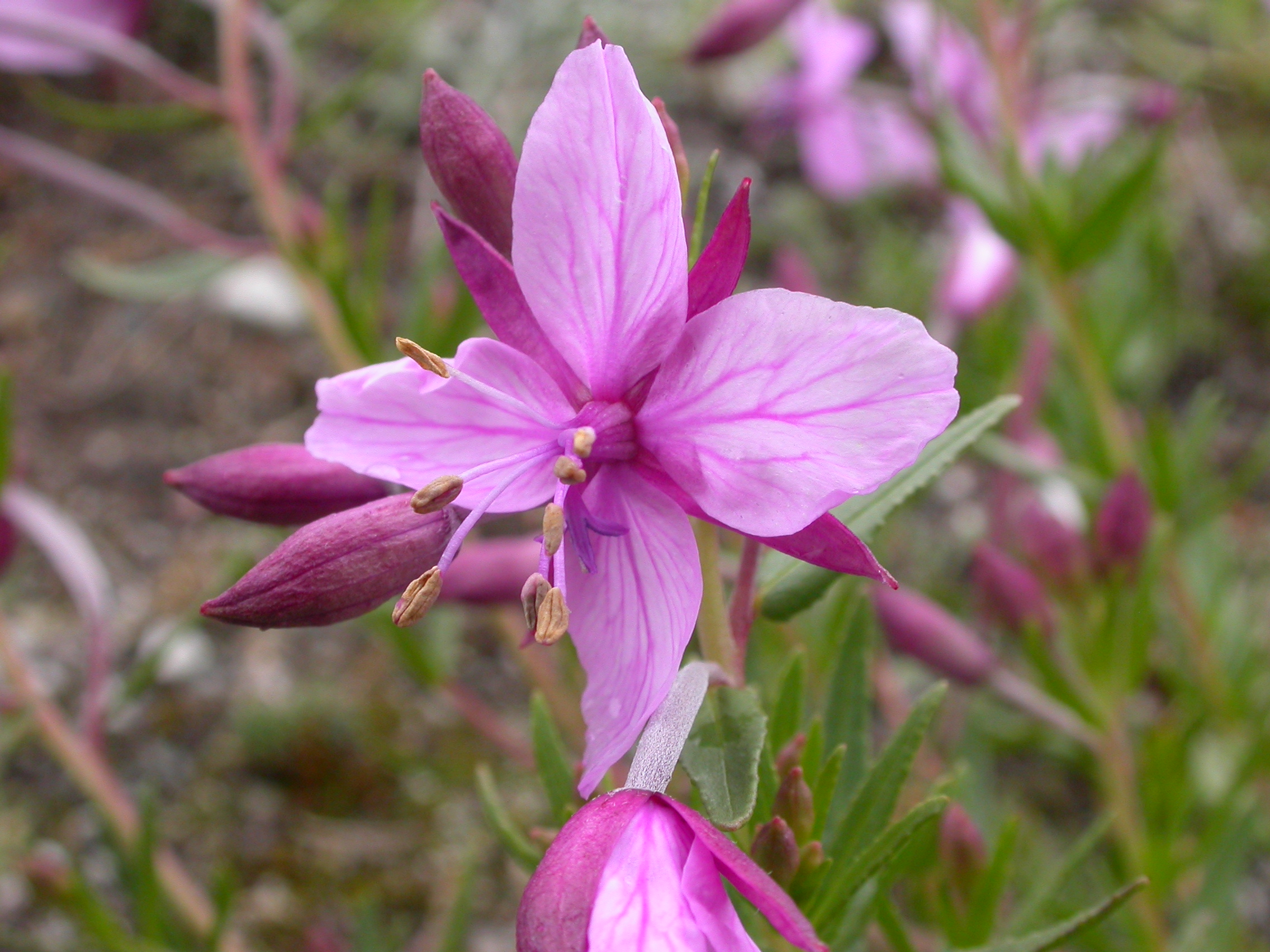
Close-up on a flower of Chamaenerion fleischeri

The biological life-form of Chamaenerion fleischeri is scapose hemicryptophyte, as its overwintering buds are situated just below the soil surface and the floral axis is more or less erect with a few leaves. This plant reaches on average 10–40 centimetres (3.9–15.7 in) in height. The stem is erect and the leaves are usually glabrous and toothed. This plant is quite similar to Chamaenerion dodonaei, but that is much taller and has bristly leaves.

Chamaenerion fleischeri has fragrant flowers with four pointed thin dark purple sepals and four bright pink ovate petals. Flowering occurs from late June to August.

== Distribution ==
This plant is endemic to the Alps, in France, Germany, Italy, Switzerland and Austria.

== Habitat ==
It grows in clusters on moraines, in glaciers, among piles of stones and in alluvial deposits. It prefers siliceous soils, at an altitude of 600–2,700 metres (2,000–8,900 ft) above sea level.

== Gallery ==
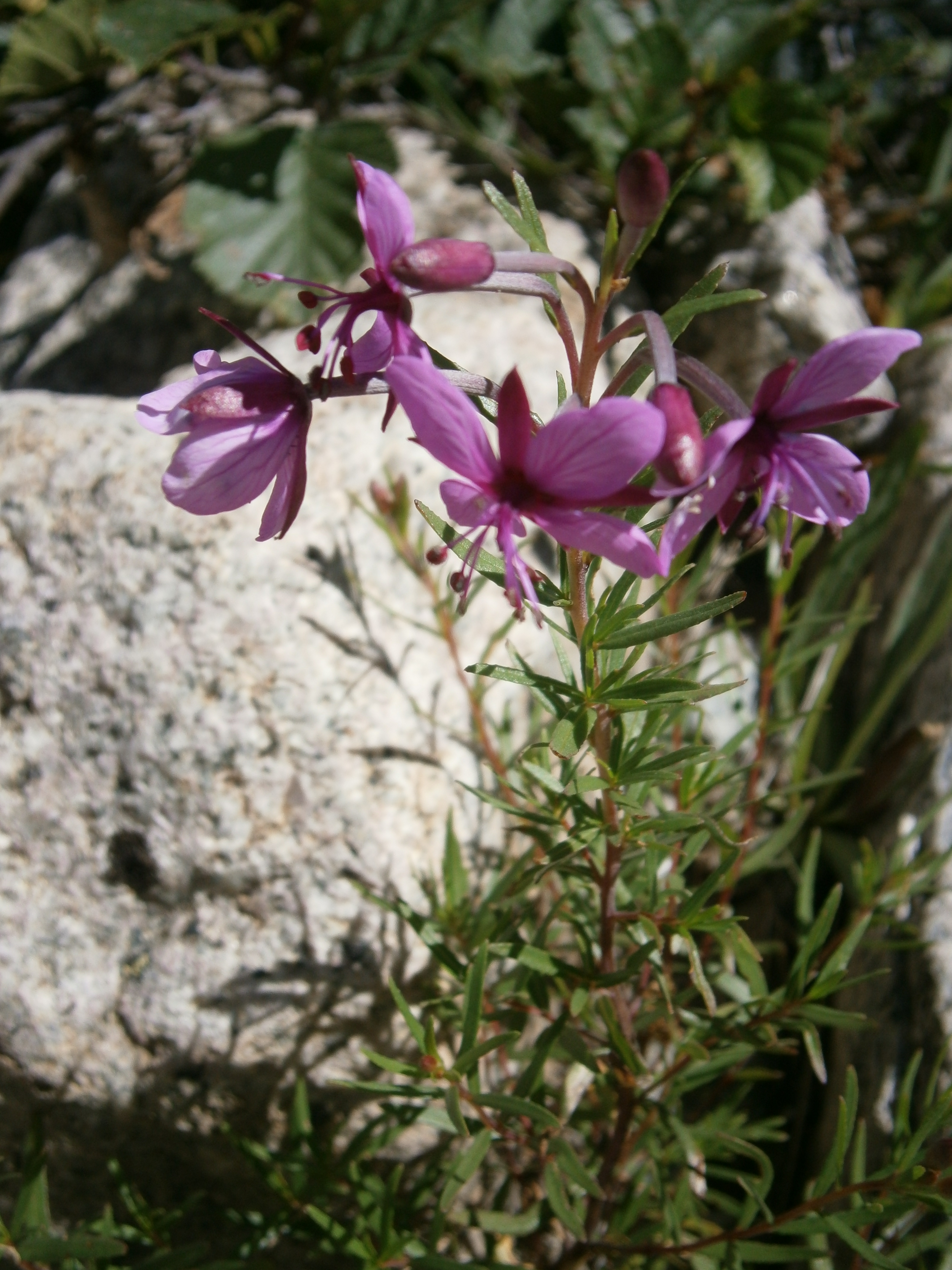
Plant of Chamaenerion fleischeri

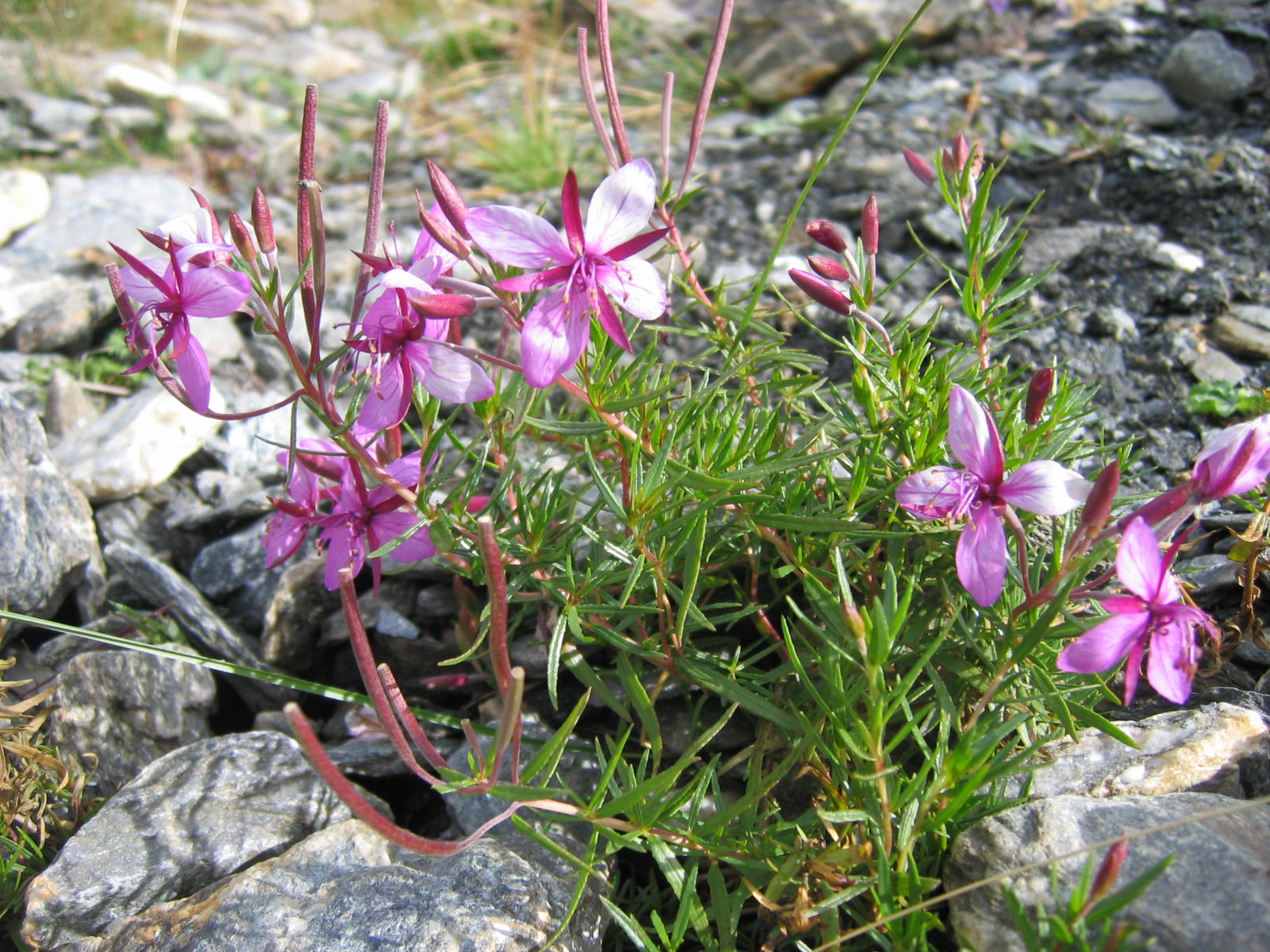
Plant of Chamaenerion fleischeri

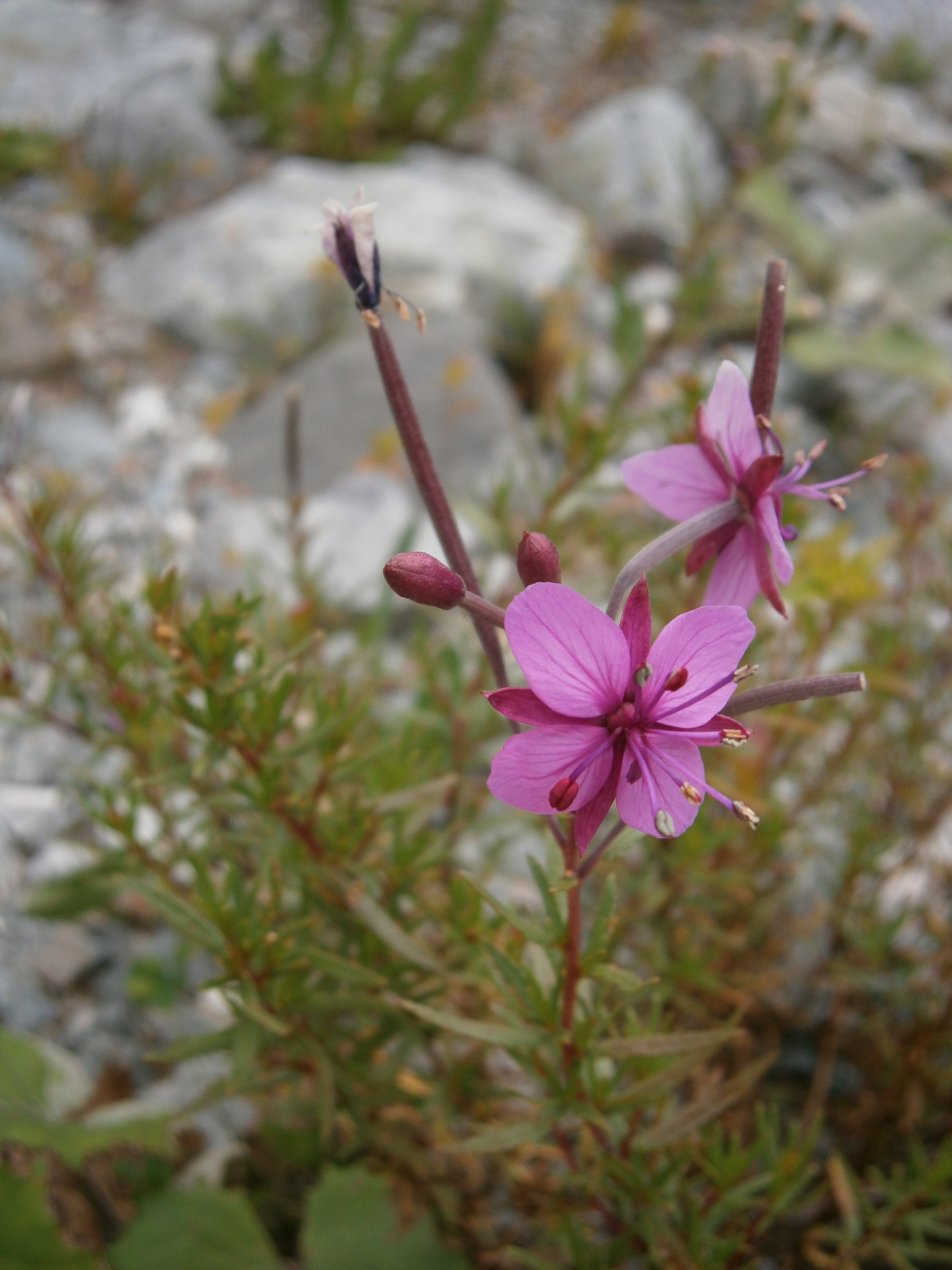
Flowers of Chamaenerion fleischeri
