= Farnham Mires =

Site of Special Scientific Interest in North Yorkshire, England

- Site of Special Scientific Interest
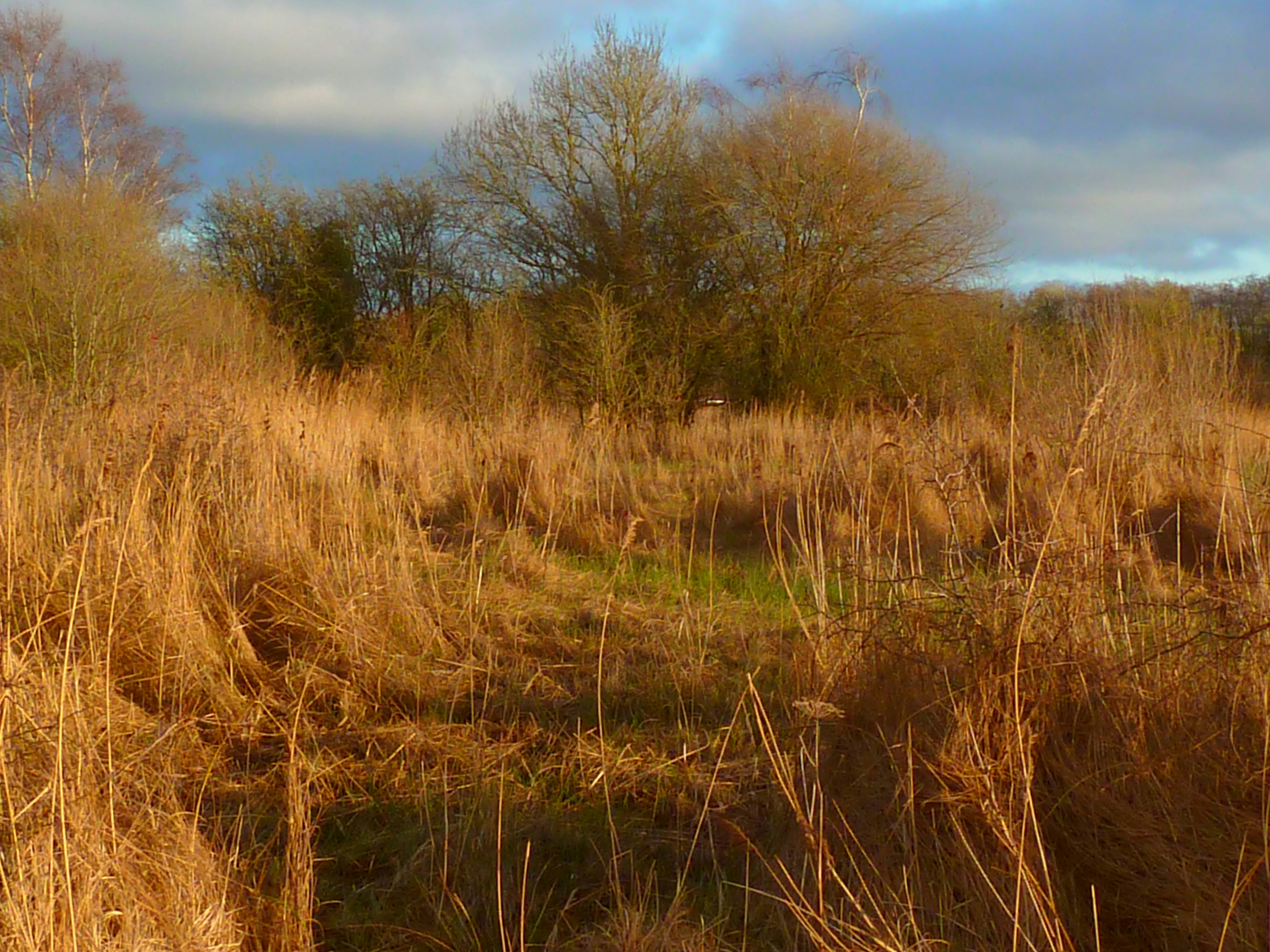
- The mire

- Location within North Yorkshire
- Location of Farnham Mires.
- Area of search: North Yorkshire
- Grid reference: SE338604
- Coordinates: 54.0384°N 1.4853°W
- Interest: Biological
- Area: 10.3341 hectares (0.1033 km^{2}; 0.03990 sq mi)
- Notification date: 1954; Revised 13 January 1984
- Location map: Magic Map (Defra)

Farnham Mires is a Site of Special Scientific Interest, or SSSI, to the west of the village of Farnham, North Yorkshire, England. It consists of a spring-fed marshy fen or mire with reeds and sedge, and drier calcareous grassland containing a diverse range of flora. It has a history of poaching and fox hunting, but since the late 19th century, the attention of botanists has been drawn to its large variety of flowering plants. It has received some consideration on this account since 1944, and from 1954 it was designated SSSI status. This site has no facilities, and is not open to the public.

== Site history ==
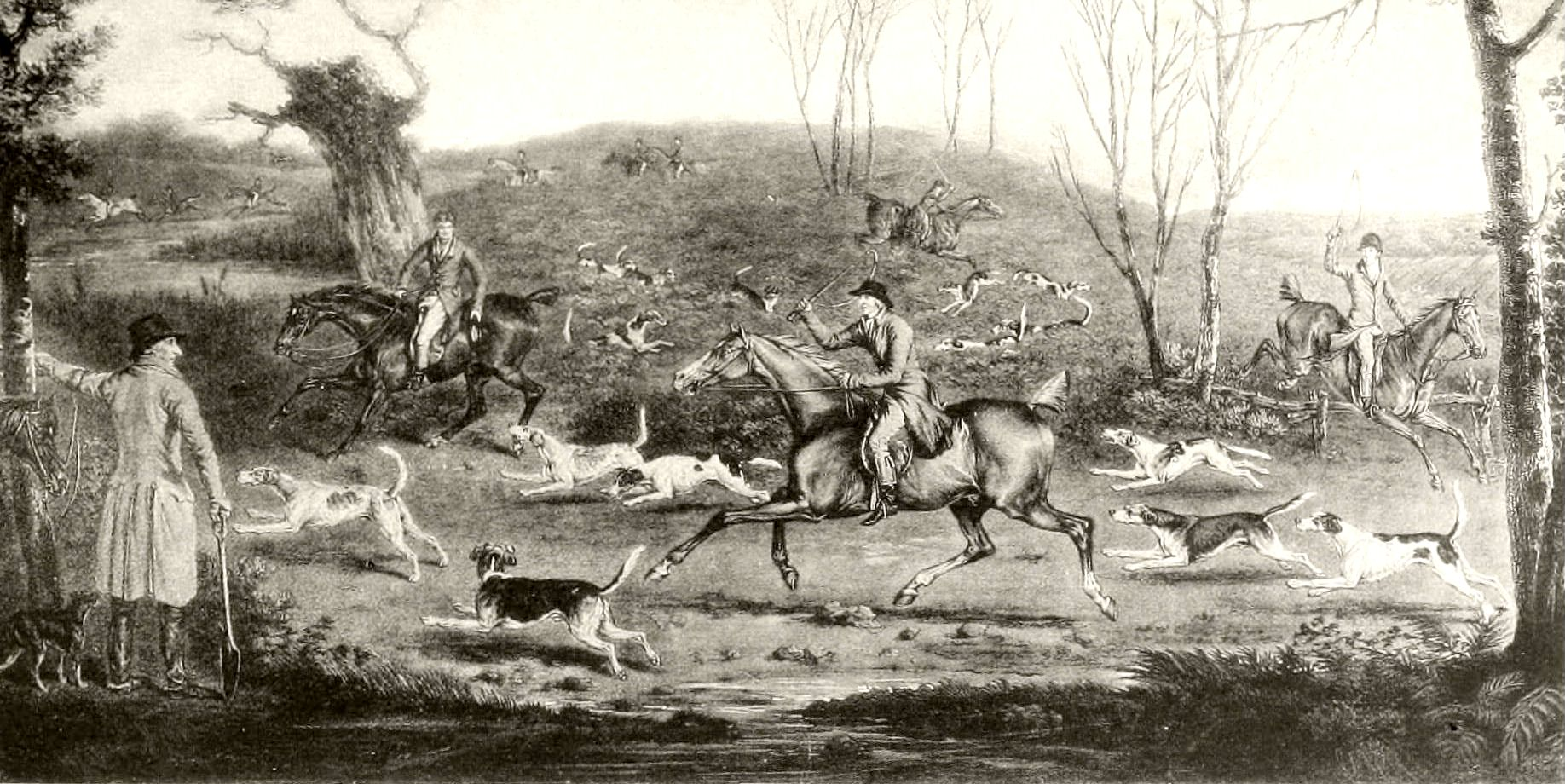
The York and Ainsty Hunt, 1899

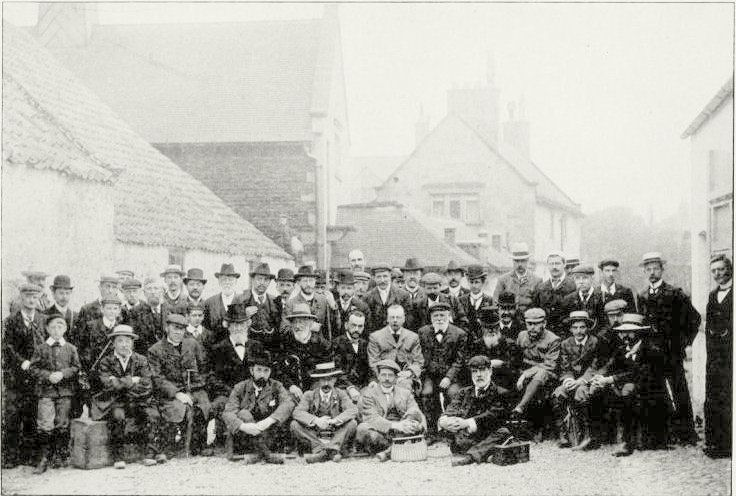
Yorkshire Naturalists' Union, 1903

In 1856, James Frankland, Thomas Jackson and James Kendrew were sentenced to three, six and four months imprisonment with hard labour, respectively, for poaching at Farnham Mires and for beating those who tried to apprehend them. (Note: The low level of sentencing may indicate that they were poaching rabbit, not deer) In the 19th century, Farnham Mires was located in fox hunting country, it being close to Scriven Park. The York and Ainsty Hunt used to find foxes there.

However, by the end of the 19th century, attention was turning to the botanical value of the site. It drew the attention of the Yorkshire Naturalists' Union (YNU), who included it in their botanical and zoological excursions of 1885 and 1894. During the 1885 excursion the Reverend Robert Elmhirst, vicar of Farnham and Brearton, (Note: The newspaper wrongly named him E. Elmhurst (sic). Robert Elmhirst (b.ca.1836), was vicar of Brearton and Farnham from 1866 until at least 1885. He was Lord of the Manor of Fulletby and had a coat of arms. His wife was Mary Makins (died 15 March 1884), who may have created the pressed flowers collection from Farnham Mires.) presented "a large number of the rarest botanical specimens, which are found on Farnham Mires" to the botanical section of the YNU.

Oenanthe lachenalii or water dropwort, Samolus valerandi or water pimpernel, Euphrasia nemorosa or eyebright, blunt-flowered rush, fen pondweed, Eriophorum latifolium or cotton grass and black sedge, were found on the site in 1943-1944. "In 1944, Farnham Mires were scheduled for reclamation and cultivation, but an approach was made to the appropriate agricultural committee and to the Wild Plant Conservation Board, and the reclamation plans were cancelled."

== Site location and designation ==
Farnham Mires Local Wildlife Site is a 10.3341 hectares (0.1033 km^{2}; 0.03990 sq mi) biological Site of Special Scientific Interest (SSSI), featuring a "spring-fed marsh" and drier calcareous grassland over Magnesian Limestone. Some original biodiversity, especially of flora, remains in the southern section of the site, but agricultural improvement has compromised natural flora in the northern section. The site is not open to the public, and has no facilities. It is situated to the west of Farnham, North Yorkshire, on the north side of Low Moor Lane.

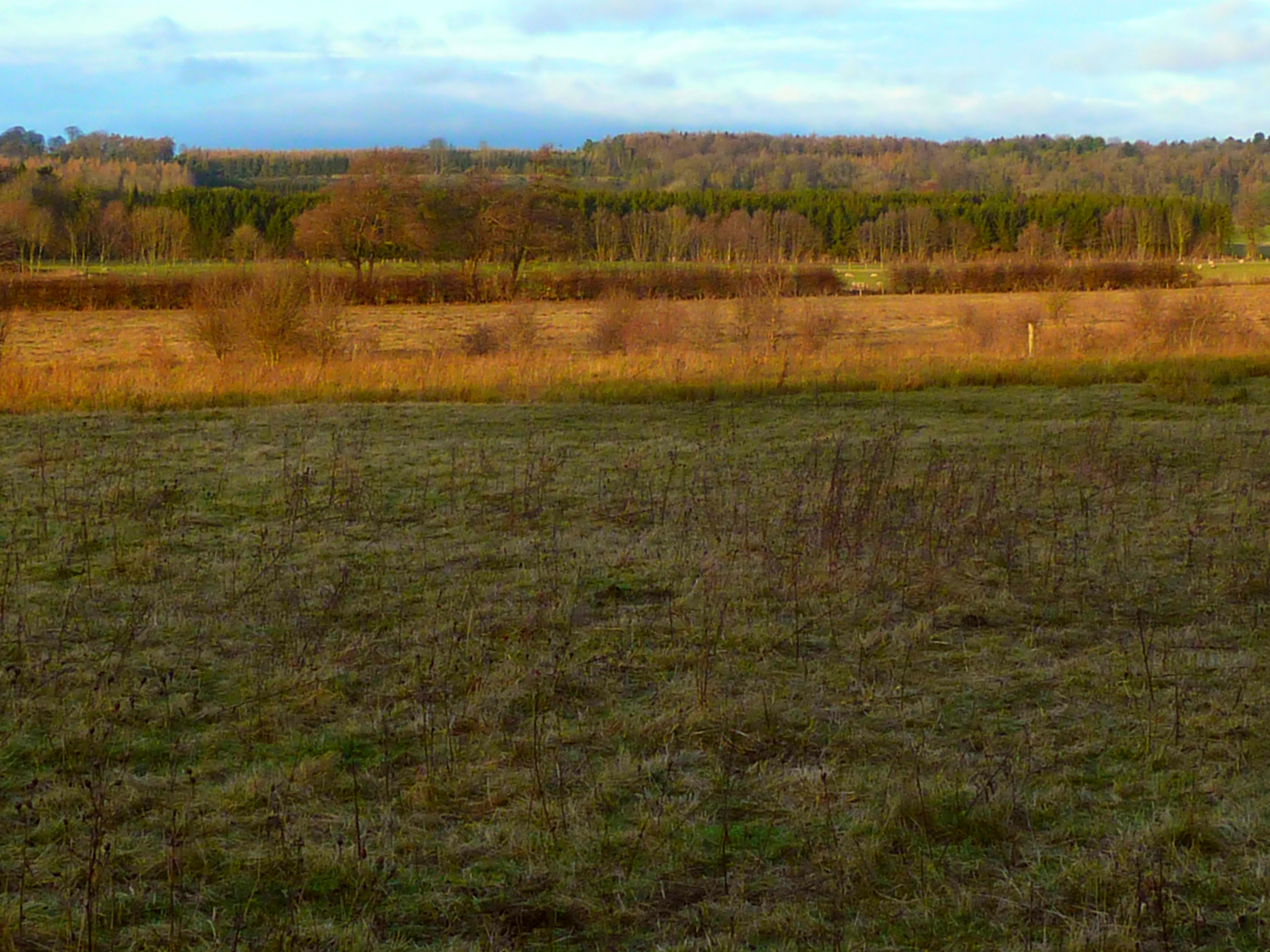
Grassland, mid south area

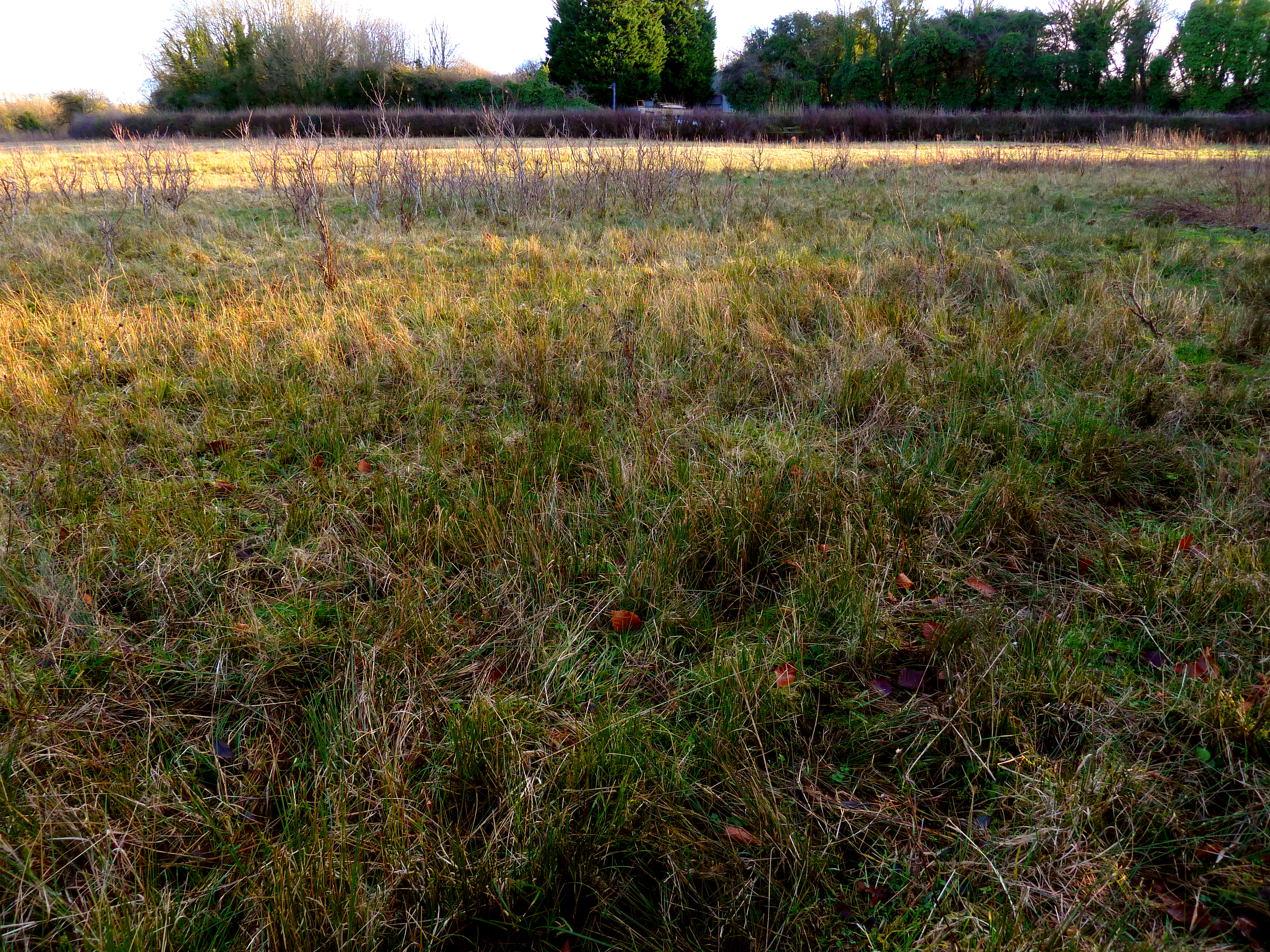
Wetter grassland, along west side of site

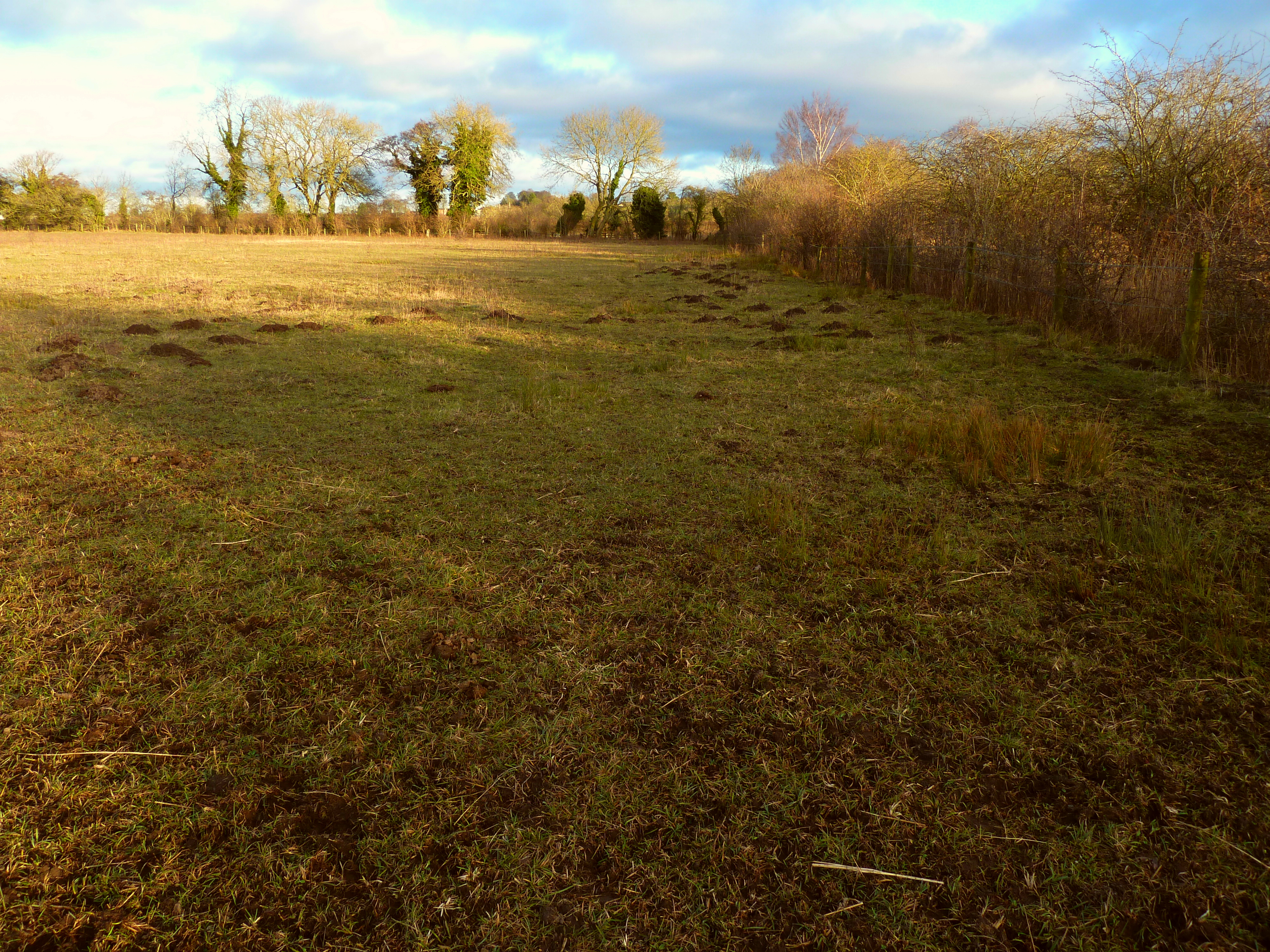
Grassland, north area

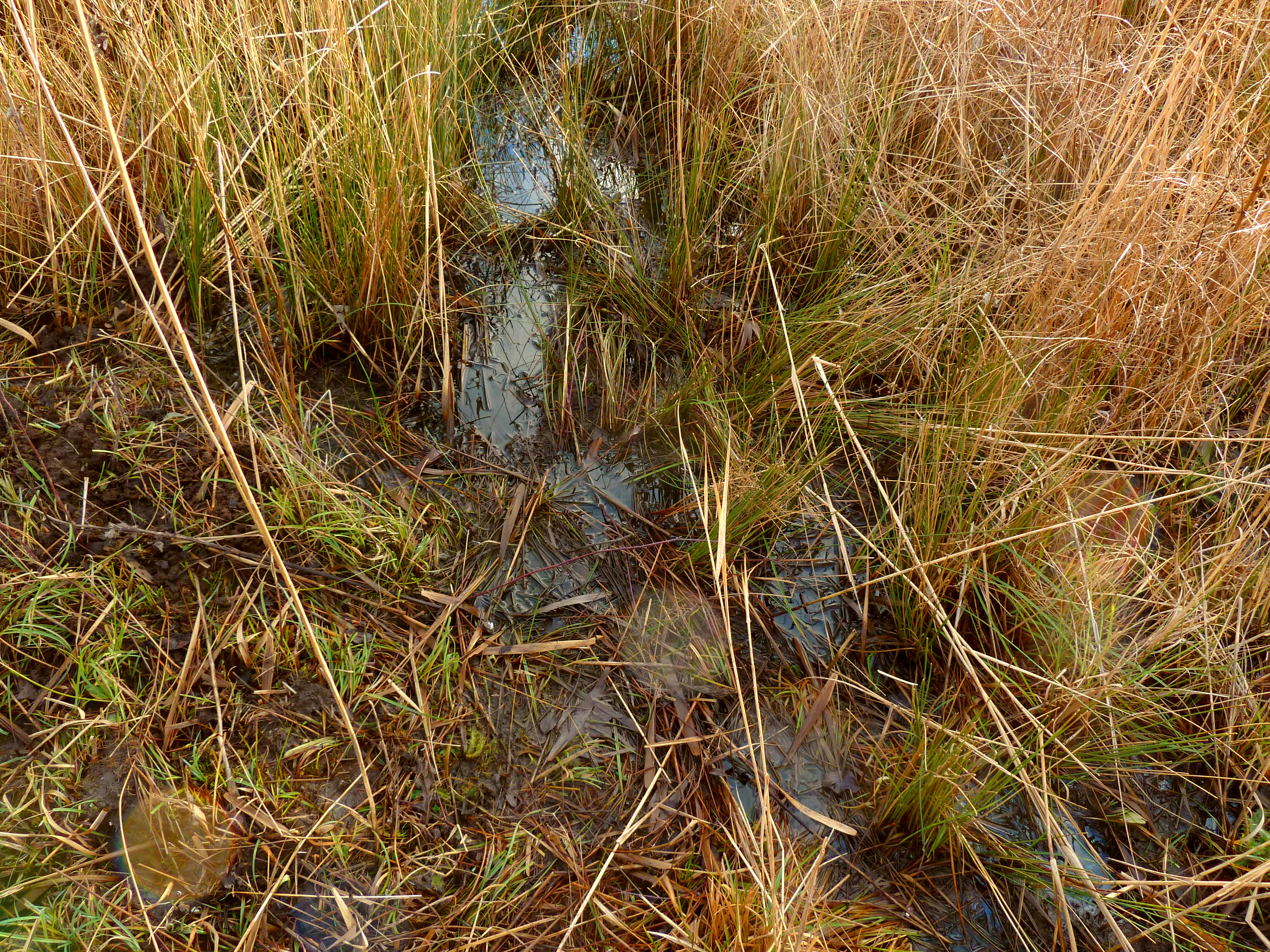
Mire, east area

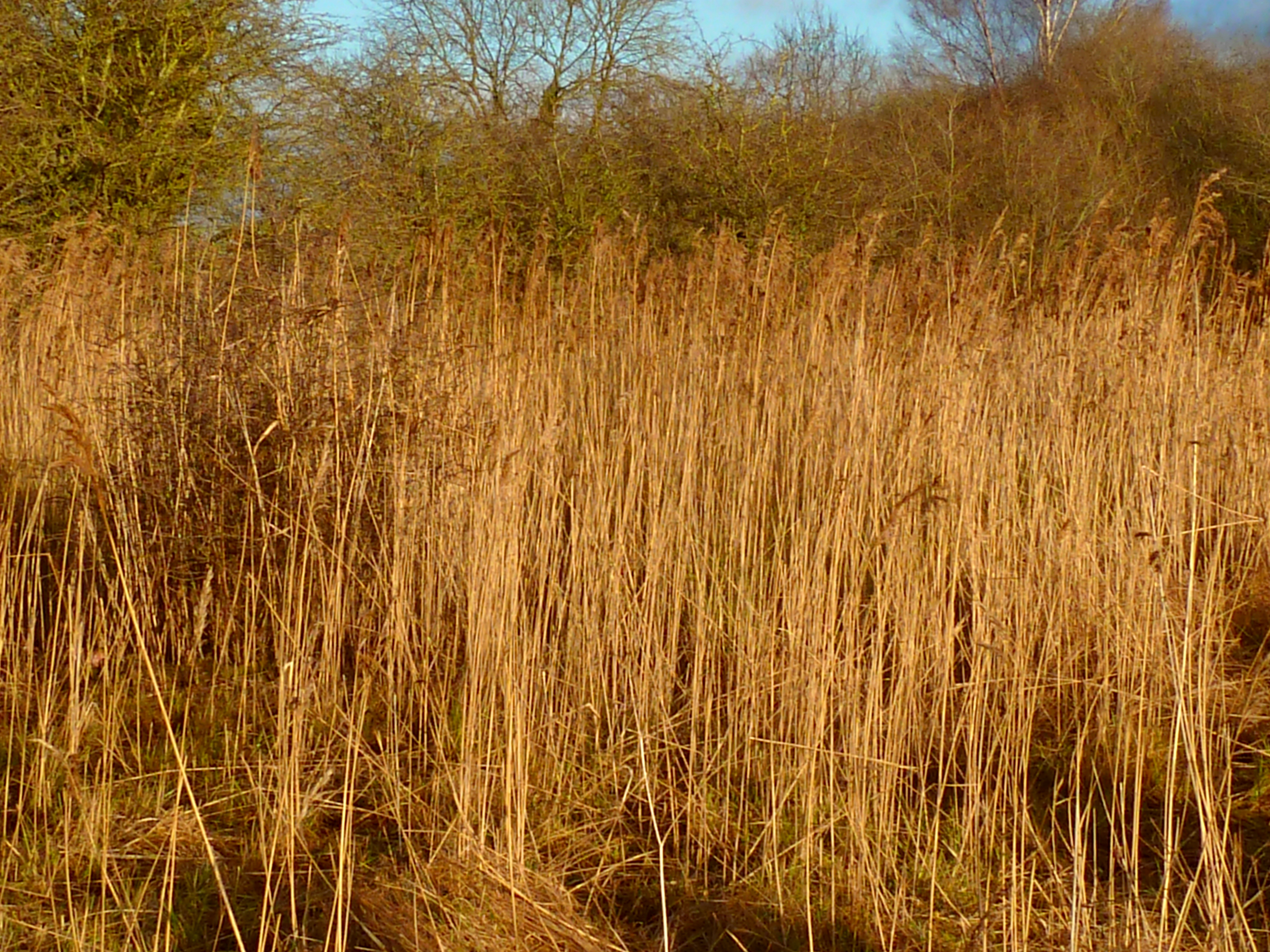
Mire, east area

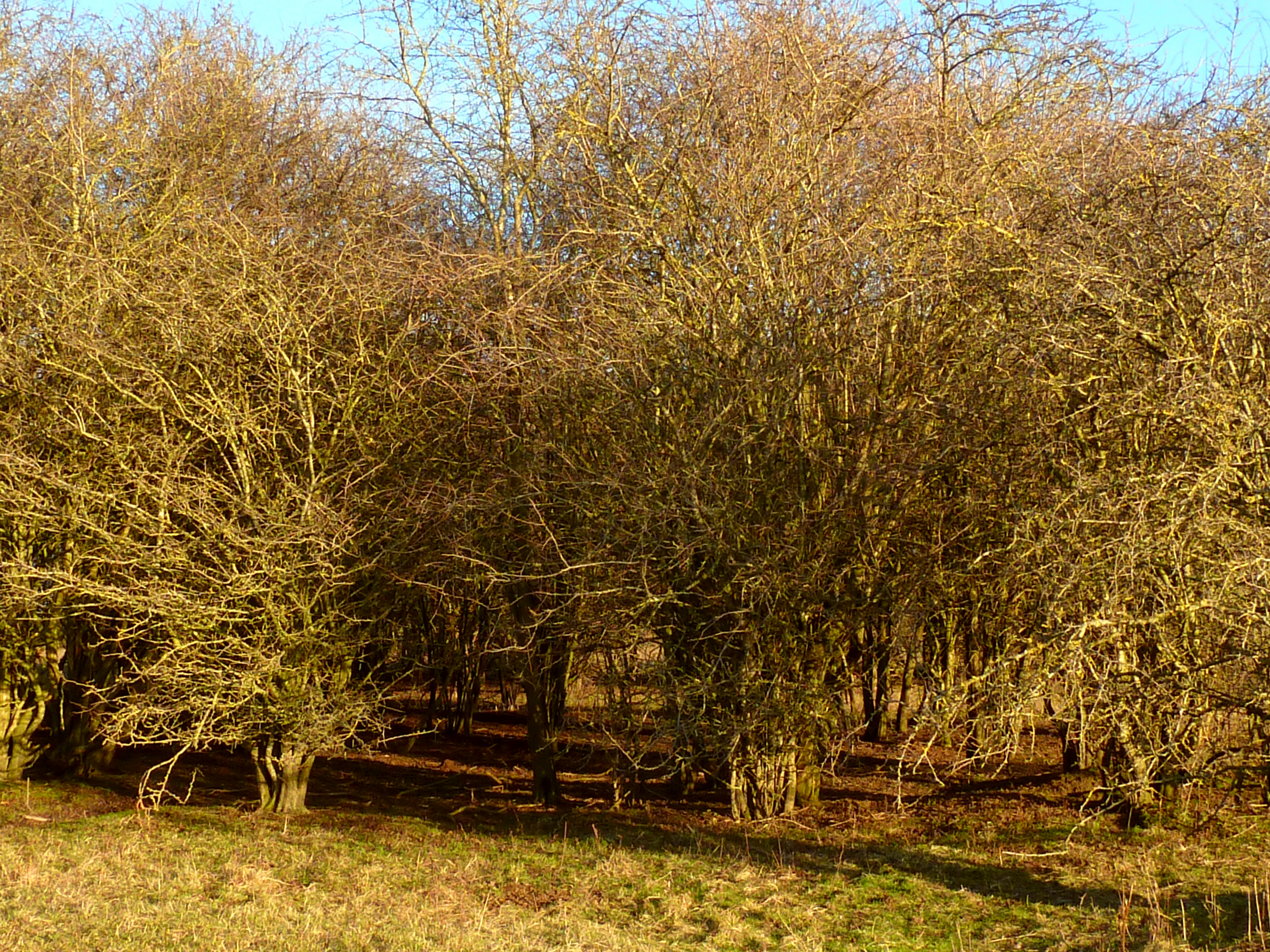
Starling Thicket, hawthorns in north area

The SSSI was first notified in 1954, the notification being revised on 13 January 1984, because it retains "the original grassland and marsh communities of Farnham Mires." That is, it features calcareous grassland with underlying Magnesian Limestone, allowing some rare species of flora to grow in the topsoil, along with some local species. This is valued even though the flora in northern part of the site has been compromised by agricultural improvement. It is also designated a Local Wildlife Site. This site is "one of a very few remaining sedge and rush dominated marshland communities in the Vale of York," the others being Upper Dunsforth and Kirkby Wharfe SSSIs.

== Significant site content ==
Note: unless otherwise stated, the photographs in this section are for illustrative purposes only, and were not taken at the Farnham Mires site.

=== Flora ===
In 1943, the site was visited by botanists George Taylor and E.C. Wallace. They saw the place "thickly carpeted" with cowslip and hairy violet, and "at the climax of the flowering season there [was] a truly magnificent array of fragrant orchids and spotted orchids." The following is a list of the "more interesting" plants which they saw in 1943: salad burnet, parsley water dropwort, pepper saxifrage, guelder rose, hemp-agrimony, hoary ragwort, bird's-eye primrose, brookweed, butterwort, common centaury, common gromwell, Rhinanthus stenophyllus or yellow rattle, Potamogeton densus or pondweed, twayblade, green-winged orchid, early purple orchid, heath spotted orchid, bee orchid, fragrant orchid, autumn crocus or meadow saffron, blunt-flowered rush, black bog-rush, sedge Blysmus compressus, bristle club-rush, sedge Eriophorum latifolium, hairy sedge, distant sedge, sedge Carex fulva, sedge Carex lepidocarpa, glaucous sedge, carnation sedge, sedge Carex caryophyllea, brown sedge, flea sedge, heath false-brome, erect brome and adder's tongue.

As of 1984, the marsh area mostly contained common reed, Juncus inflexus or hard rush, and blunt-flowered rush, along with great willowherb, purple loosestrife and meadowsweet. Where there was more groundwater, there was a "carpet of bryophytes", besides Carex lepidocarpa or long-stalk yellow sedge, carnation sedge, Valeriana dioica or marsh valerian and marsh arrowgrass, all of which grew among the more numerous lesser hairy-willowherb, marsh pennywort and marsh horsetail.

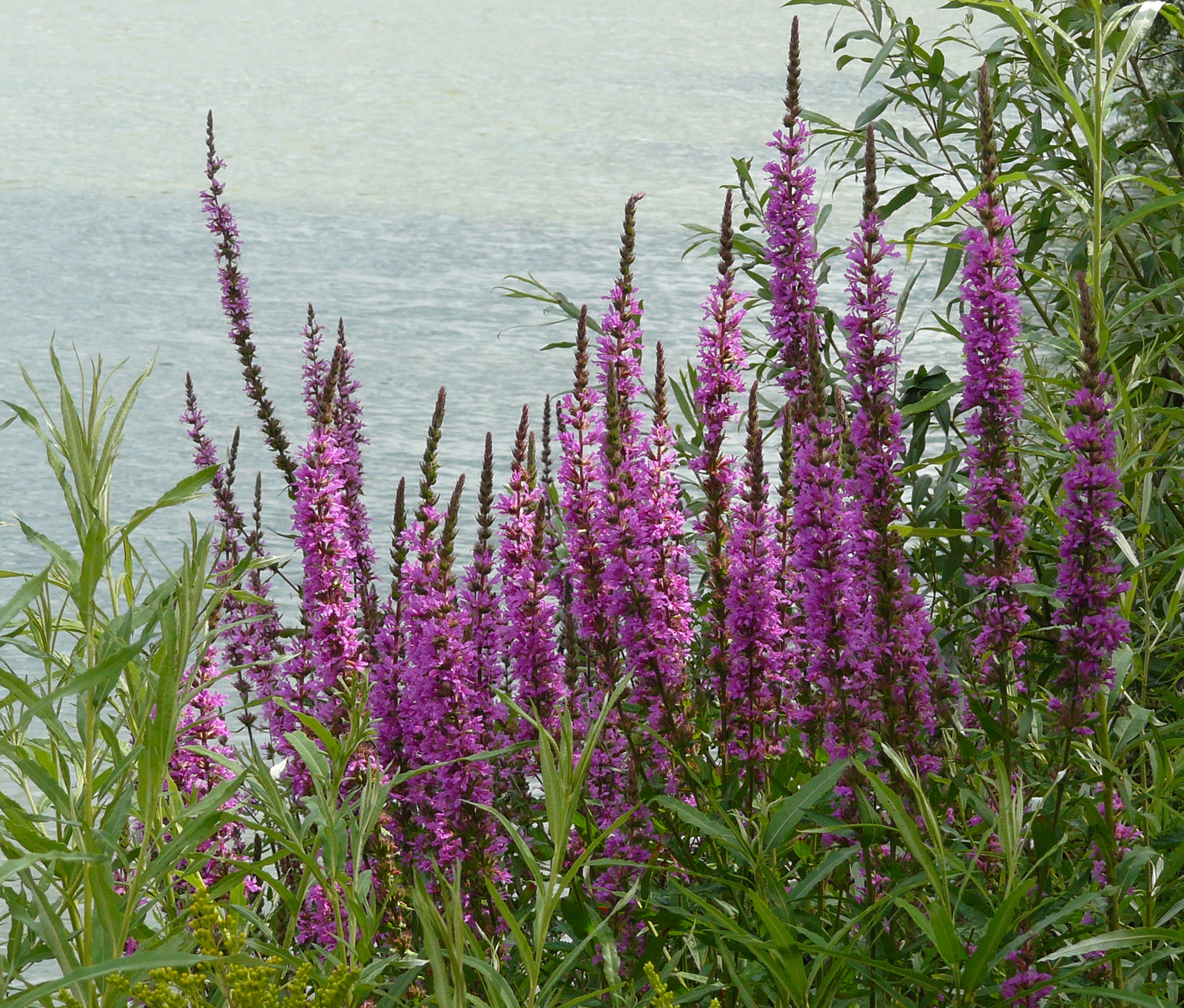
purple loosestrife

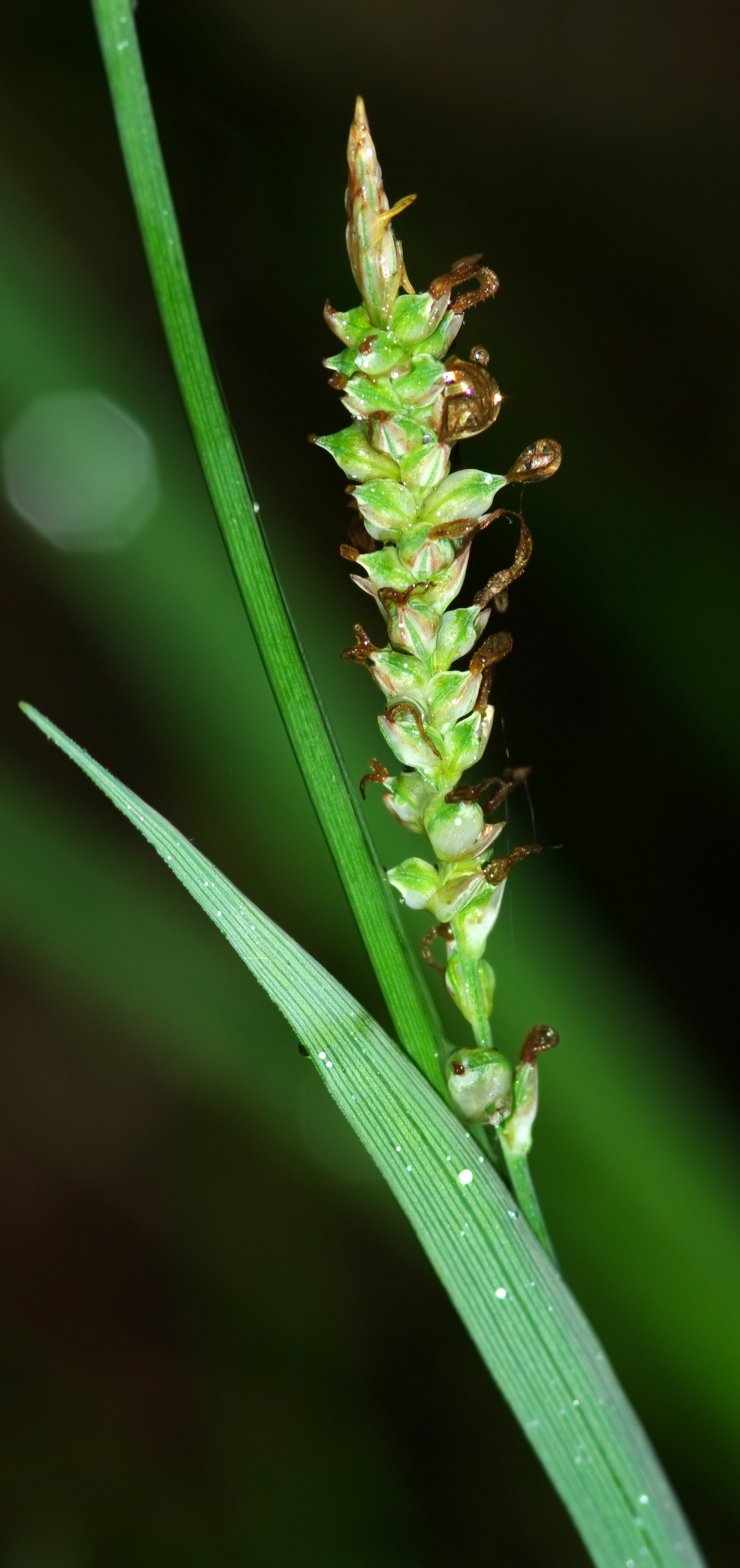
carnation sedge

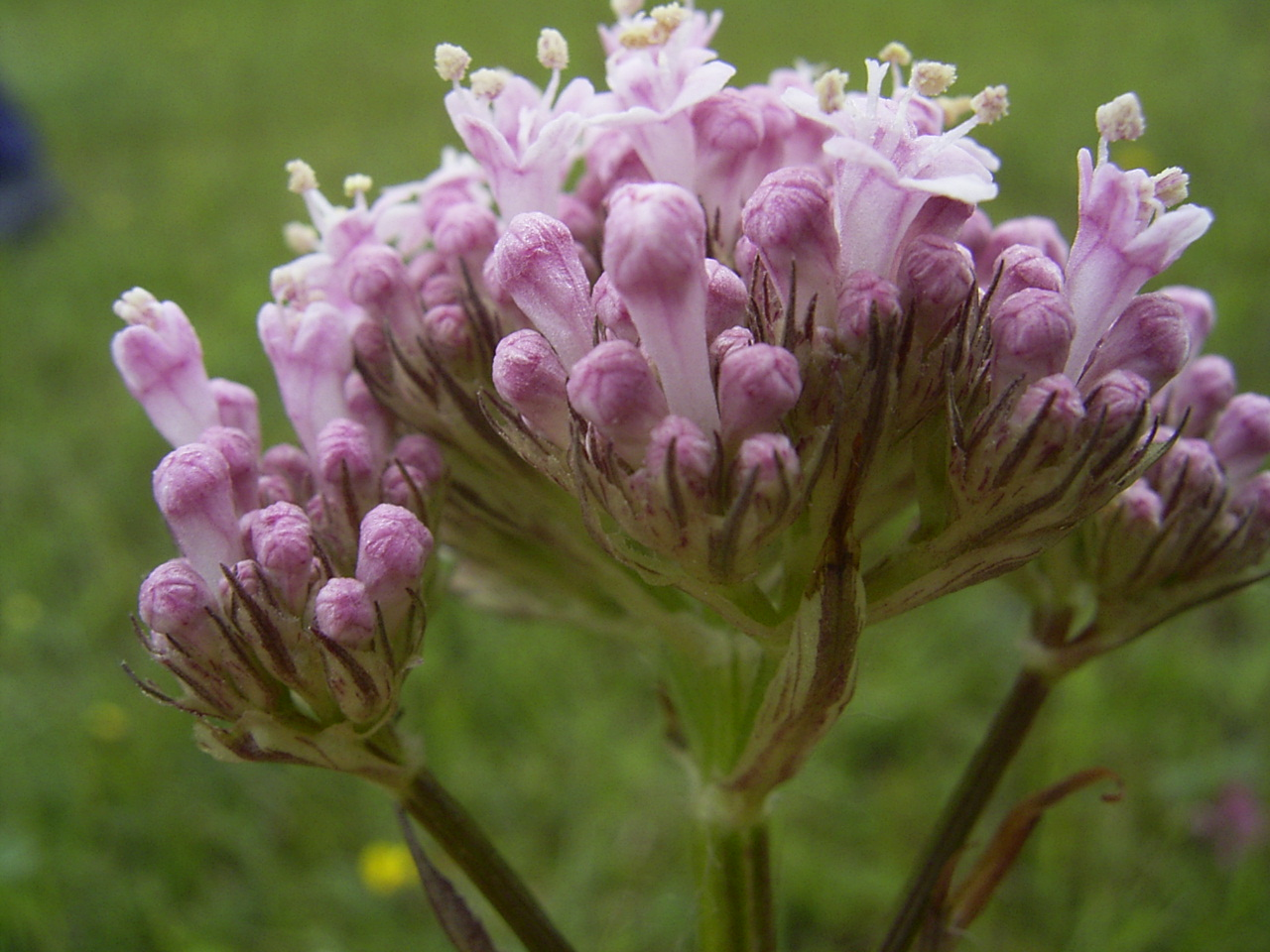
Valeriana dioica or marsh valerian

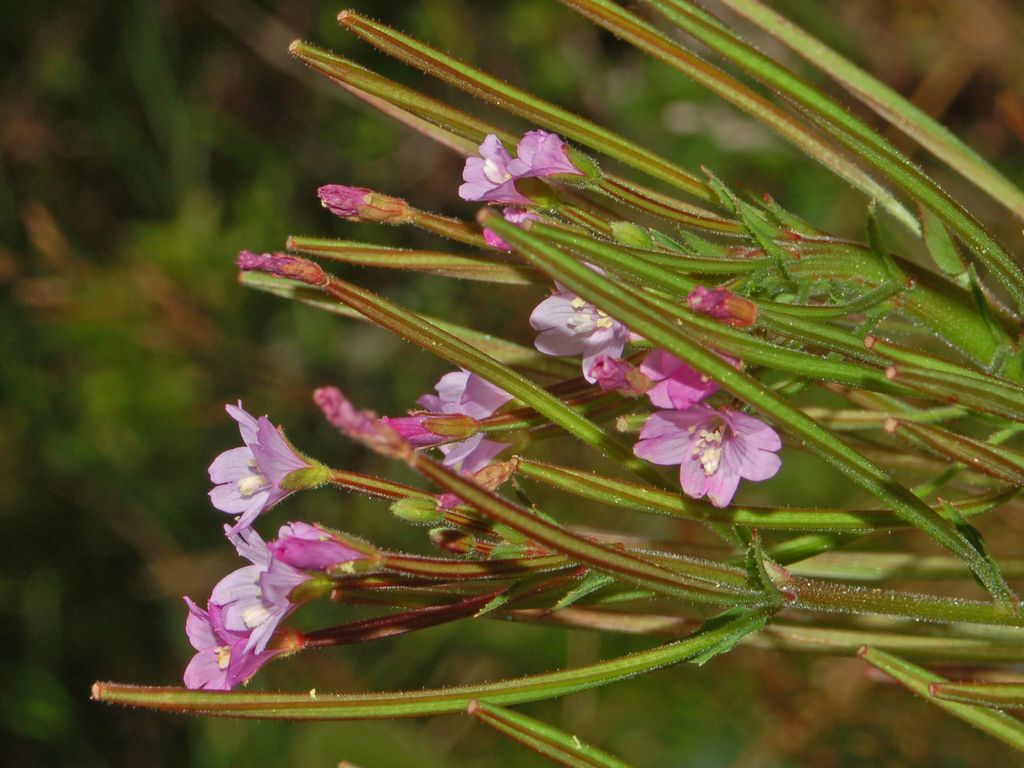
lesser hairy-willowherb

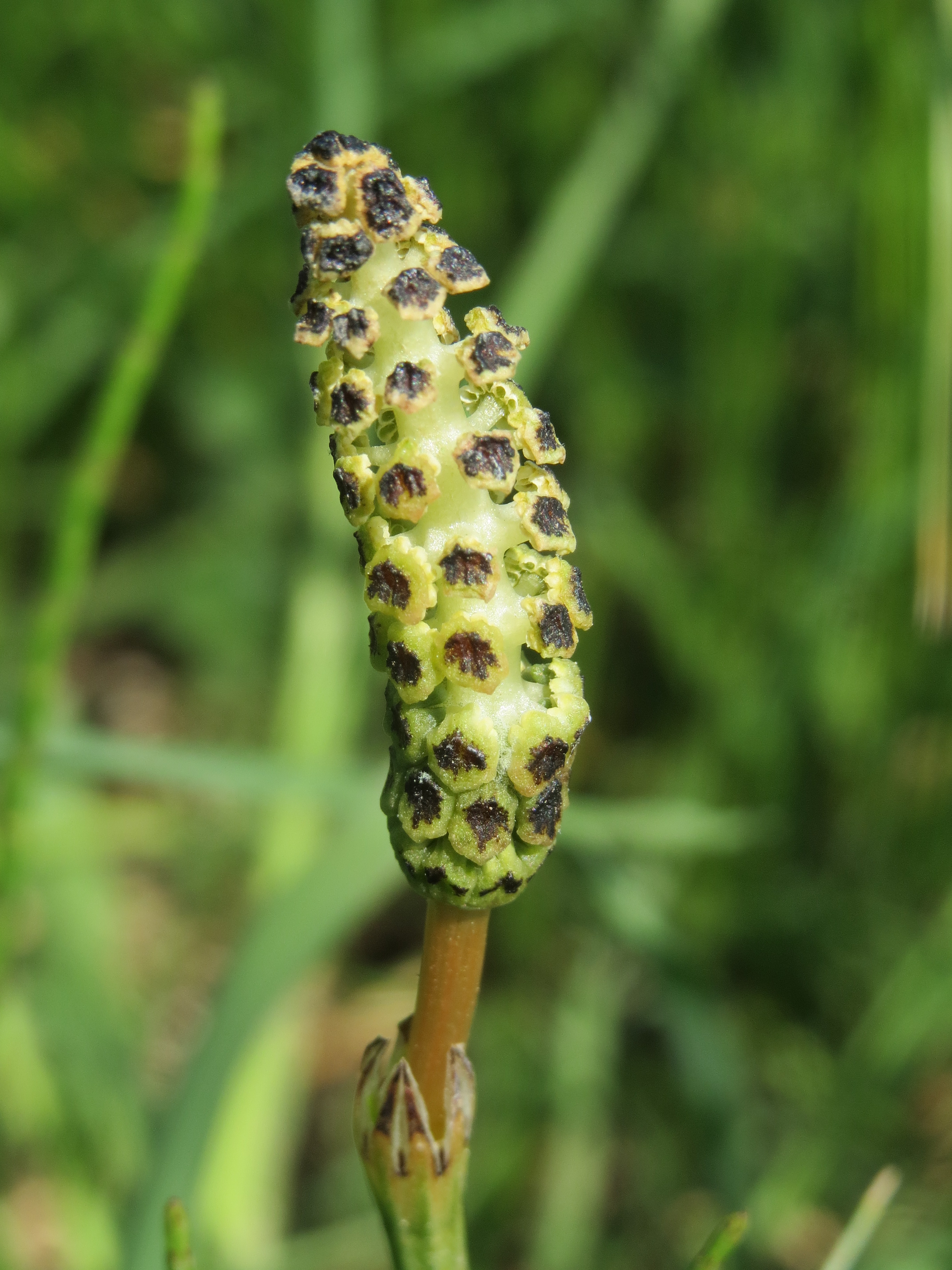
marsh horsetail

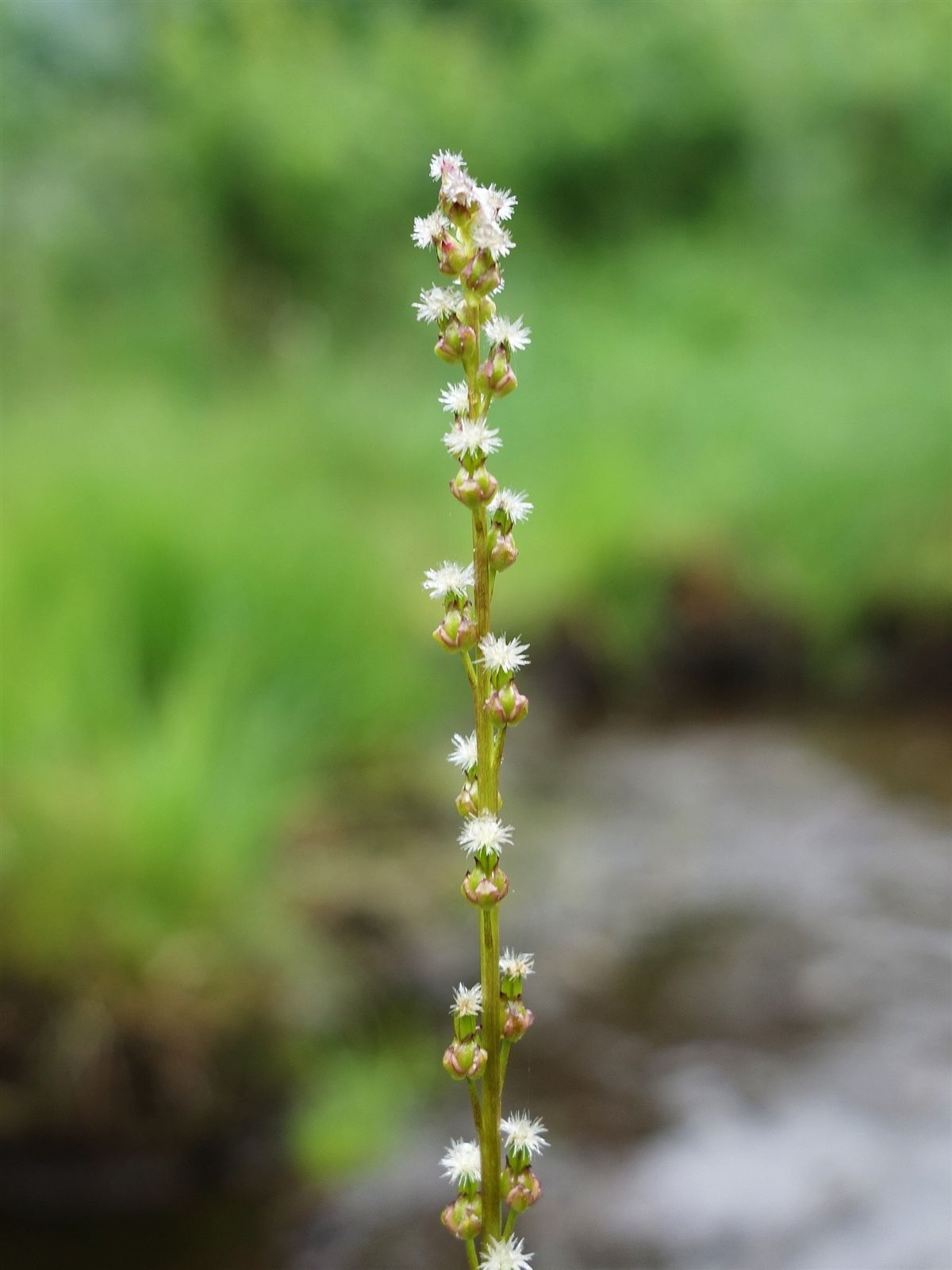
marsh arrowgrass

Around the marsh is grassland on neutral soil. On this grows twayblade, common spotted orchid, common agrimony, pepper saxifrage and knapweed, with other herbs.

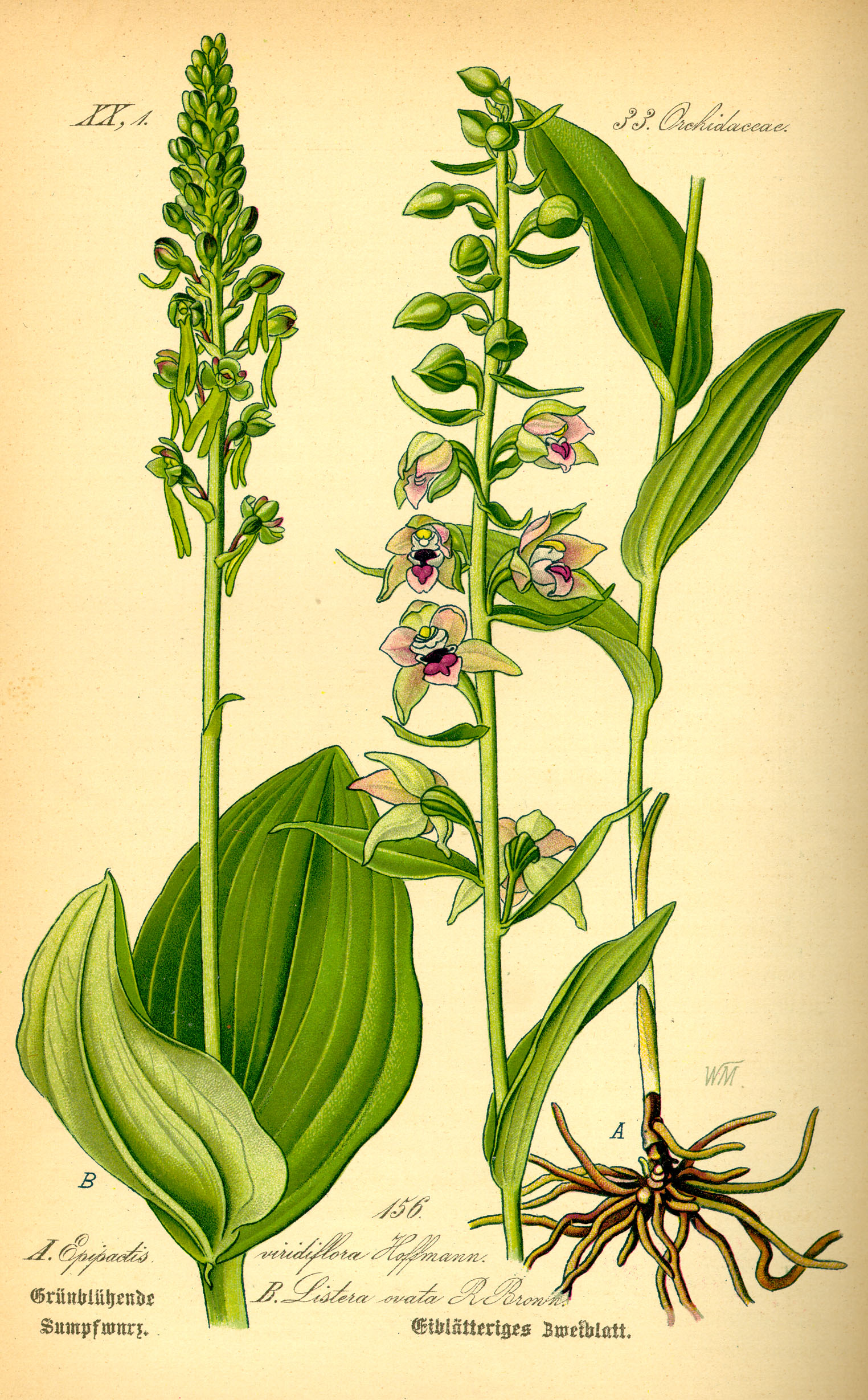
twayblade

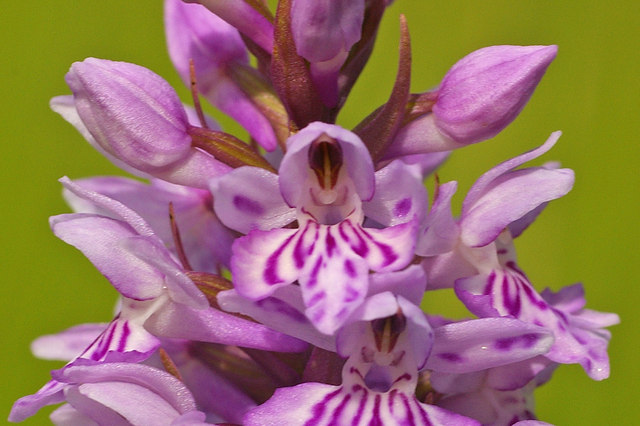
common spotted orchid

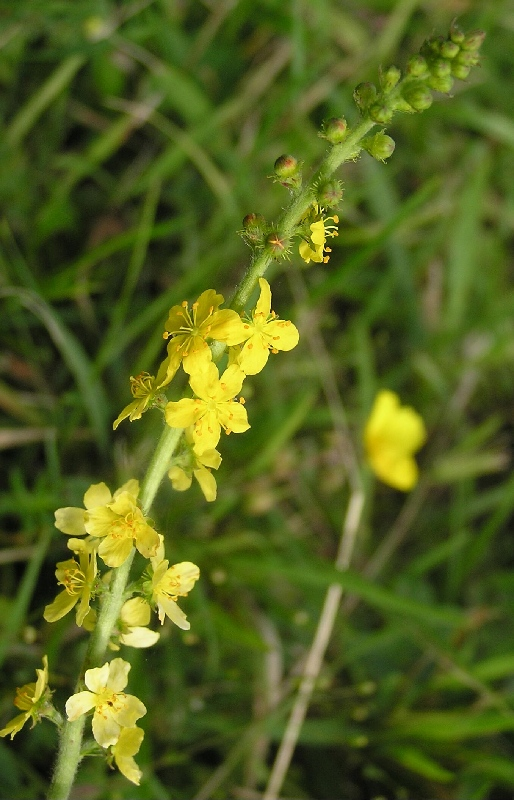
common agrimony

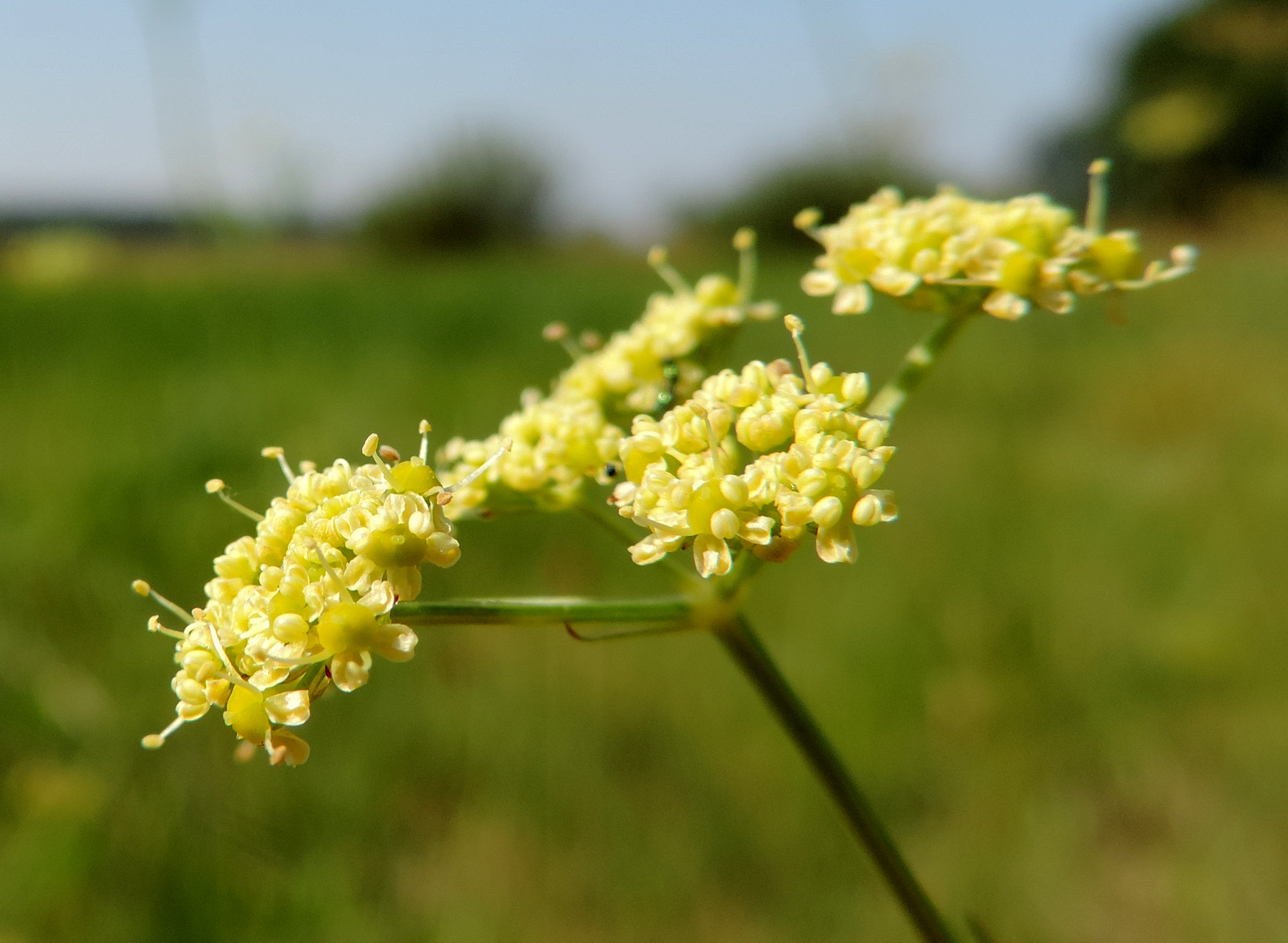
pepper saxifrage

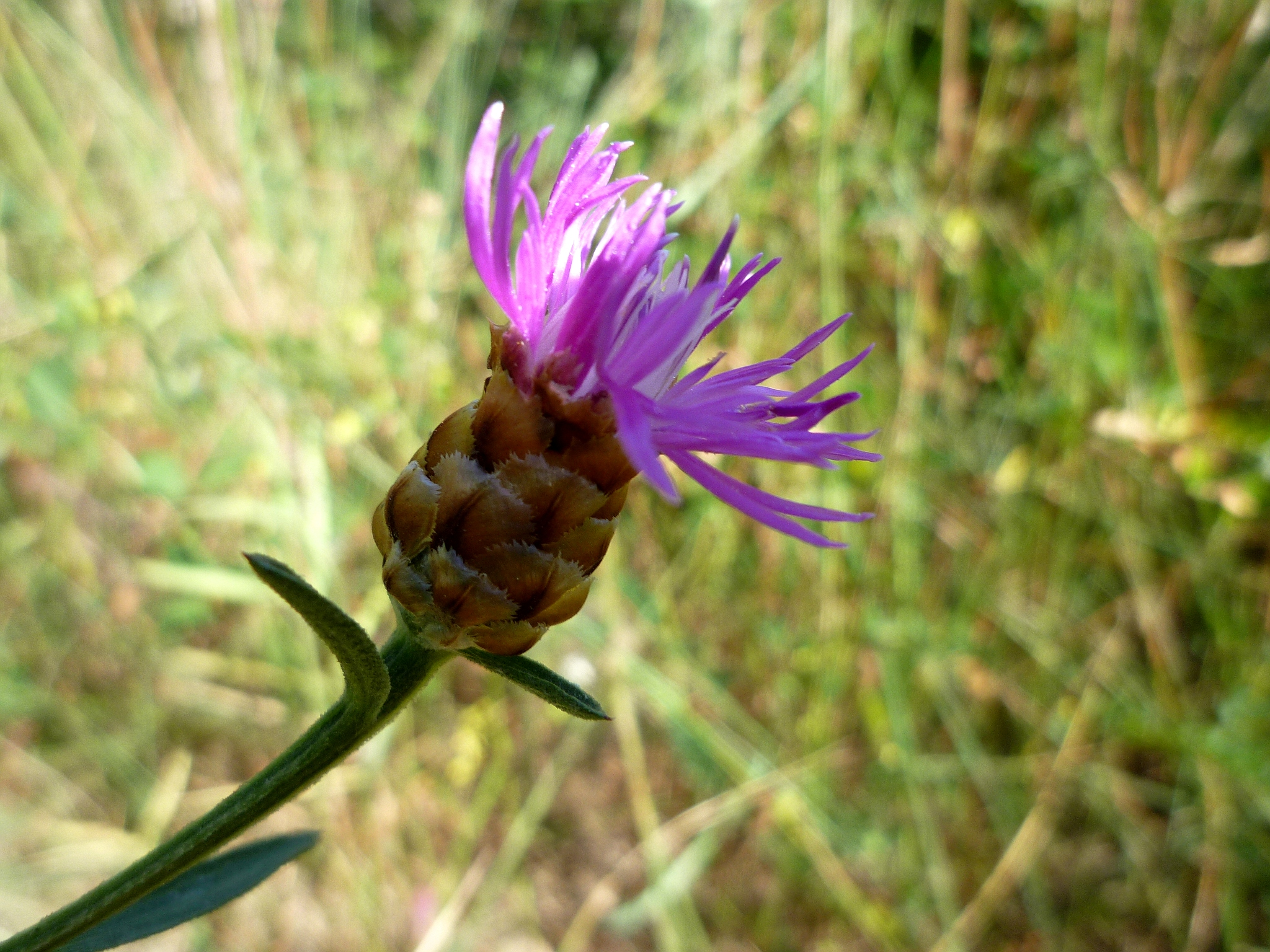
knapweed

There is also an area of "species-rich calcareous grassland" which is not waterlogged, and which has patches of buckthorn and hawthorn. This area is maintained with light grazing, to encourage grasses, sedges and diverse herbs. The grasses are purple moor-grass, heath grass, quaking grass and hairy oat. The sedges include glaucous sedge in particular. There are plenty of orchids: bee orchid and fragrant orchid. The herbs include adder’s-tongue fern, cowslip, hoary plantain, yellow rattle and betony.

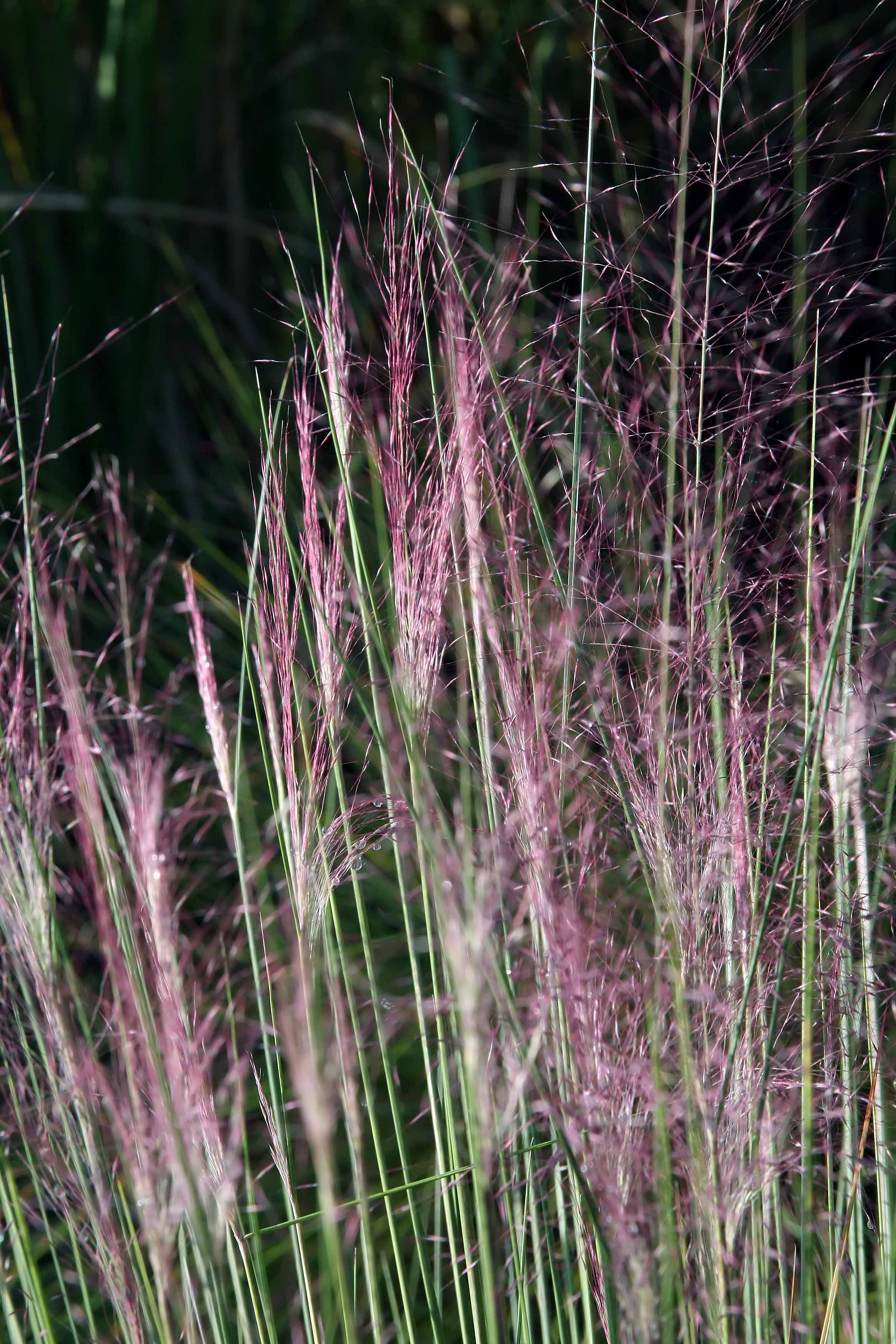
purple moor-grass

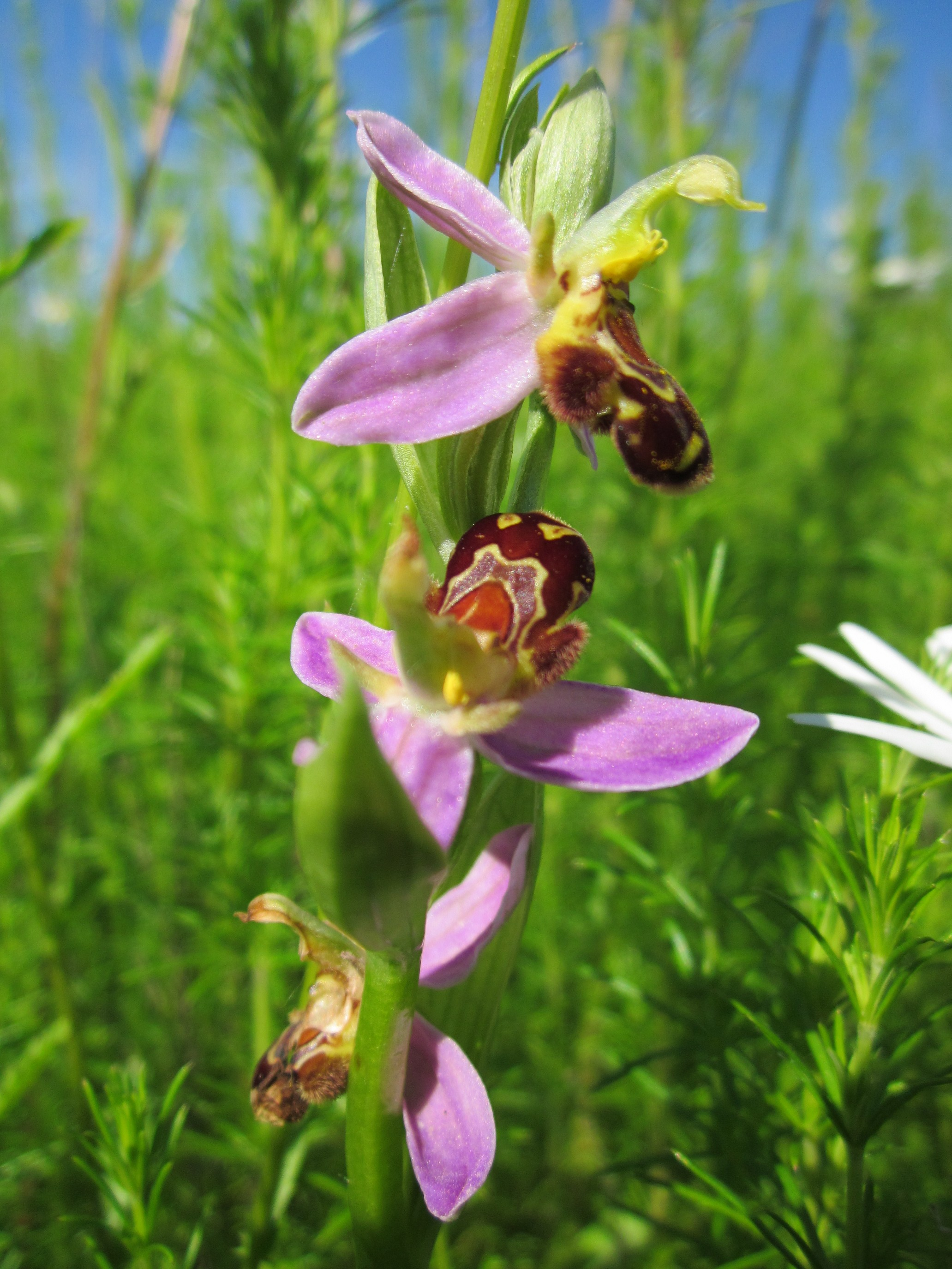
bee orchid

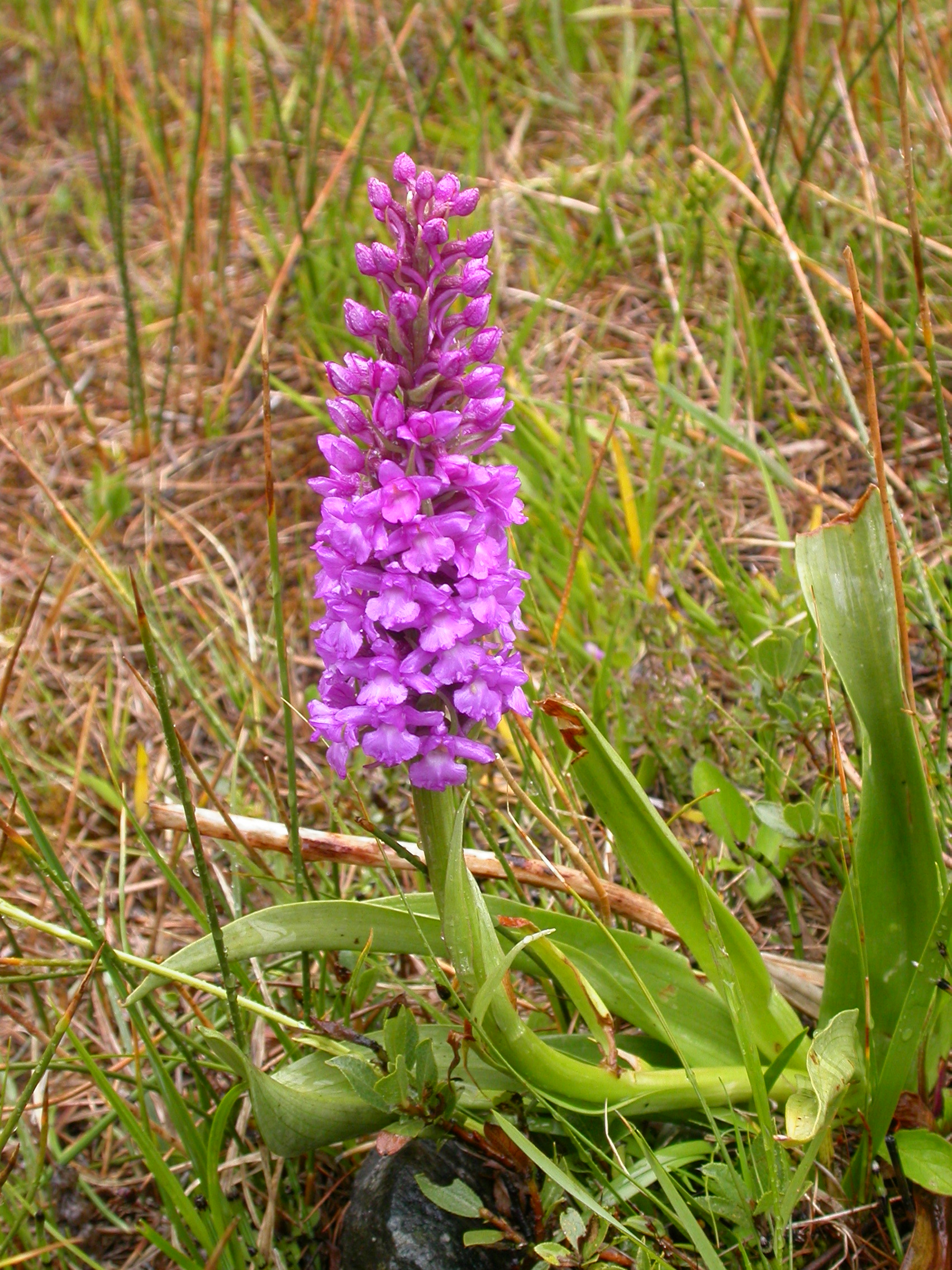
fragrant orchid

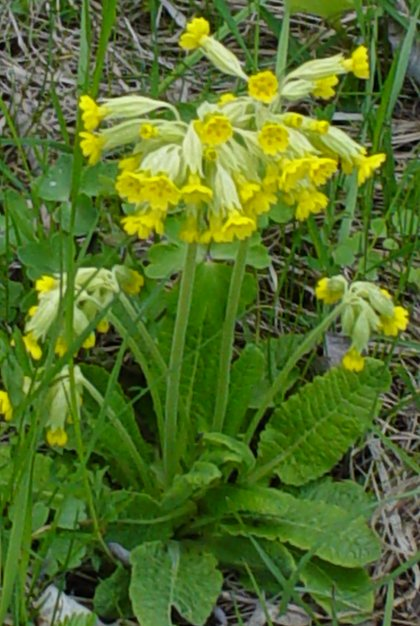
cowslip

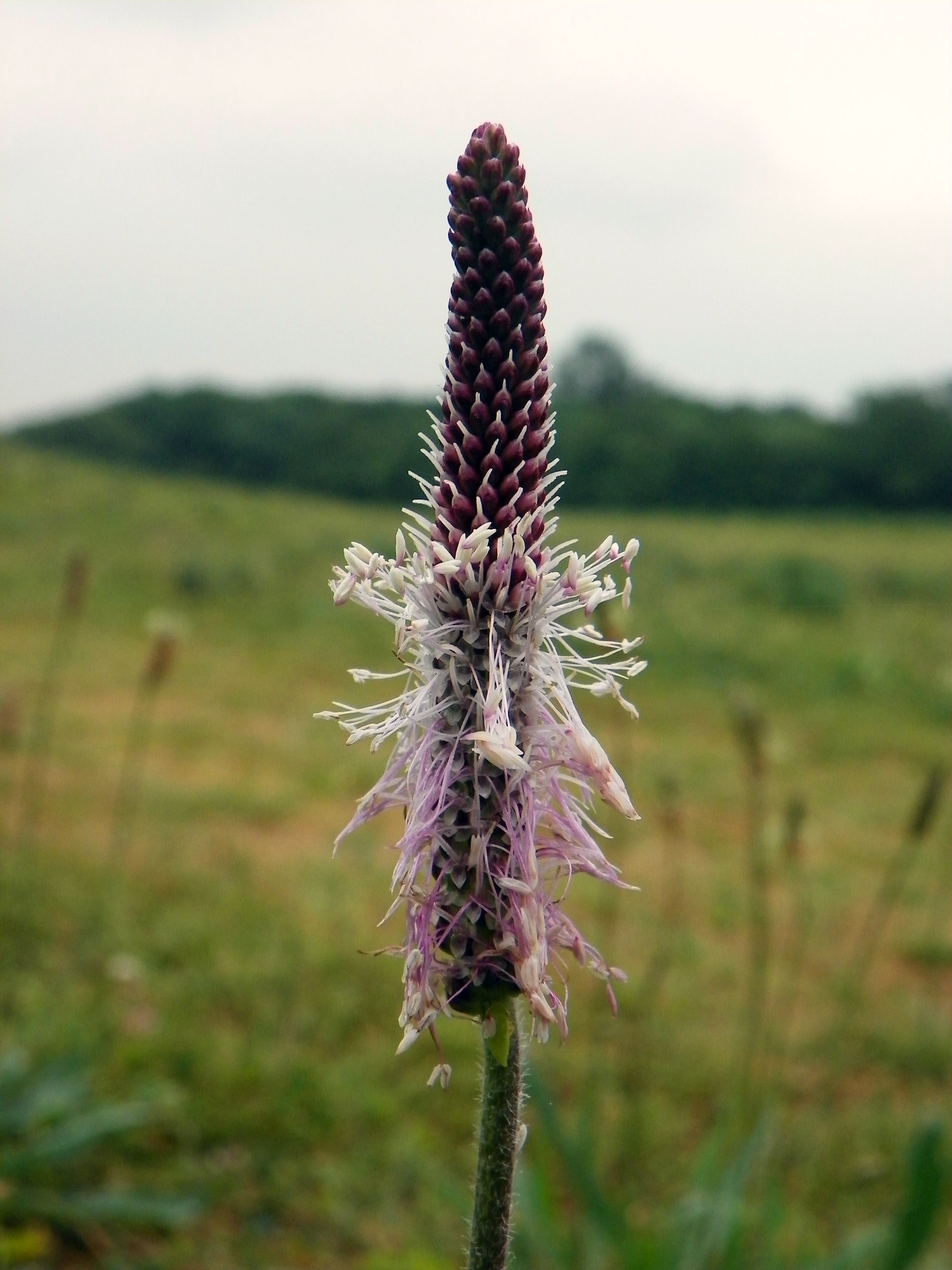
hoary plantain

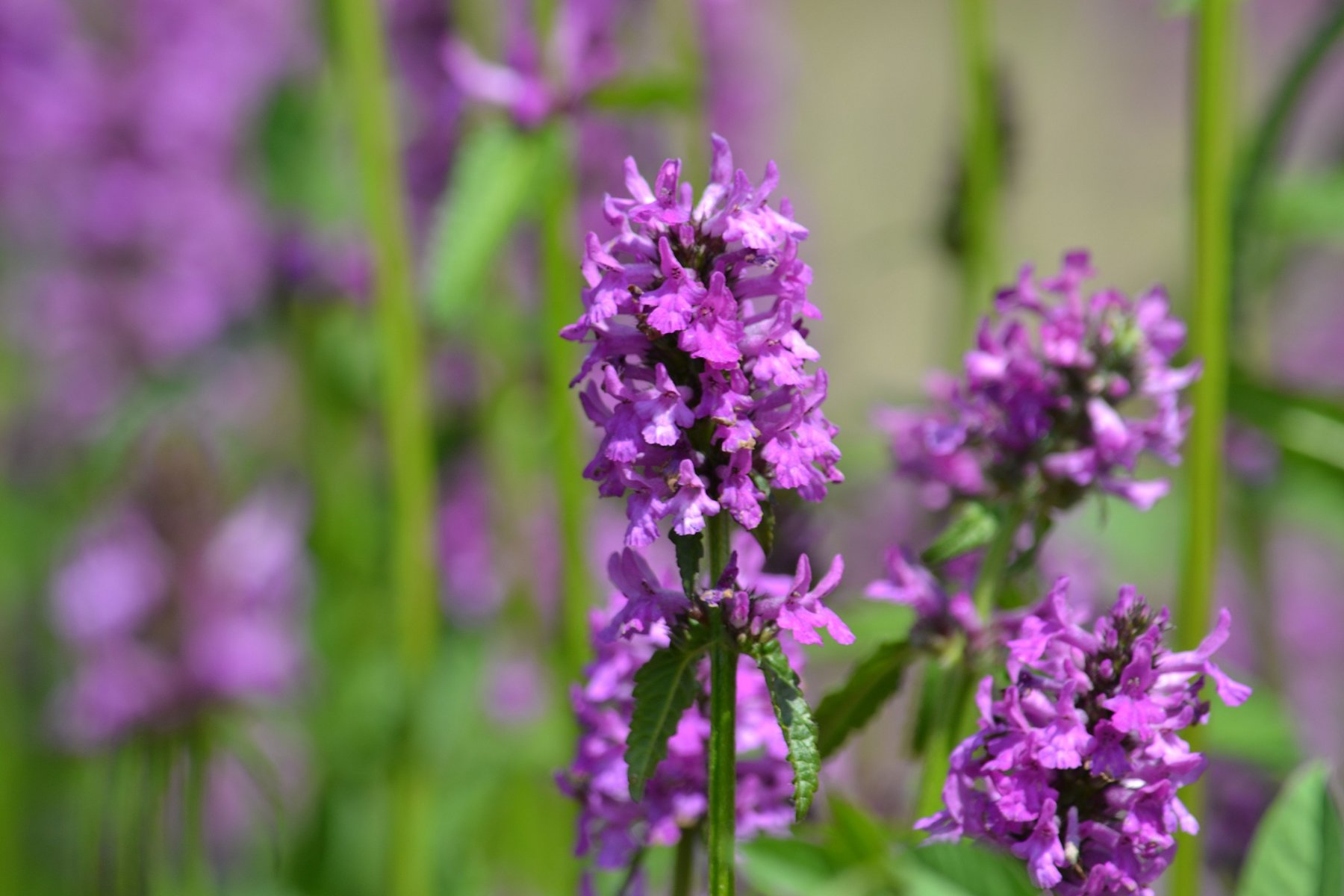
betony

The special wetland plants noted in Natural England's citation for the SSSI are: Oenanthe lachenalii or parsley water dropwort, brookweed and bog pimpernel. The drier-land plants of note are felwort or autumn gentian, and bird’s-eye primrose.

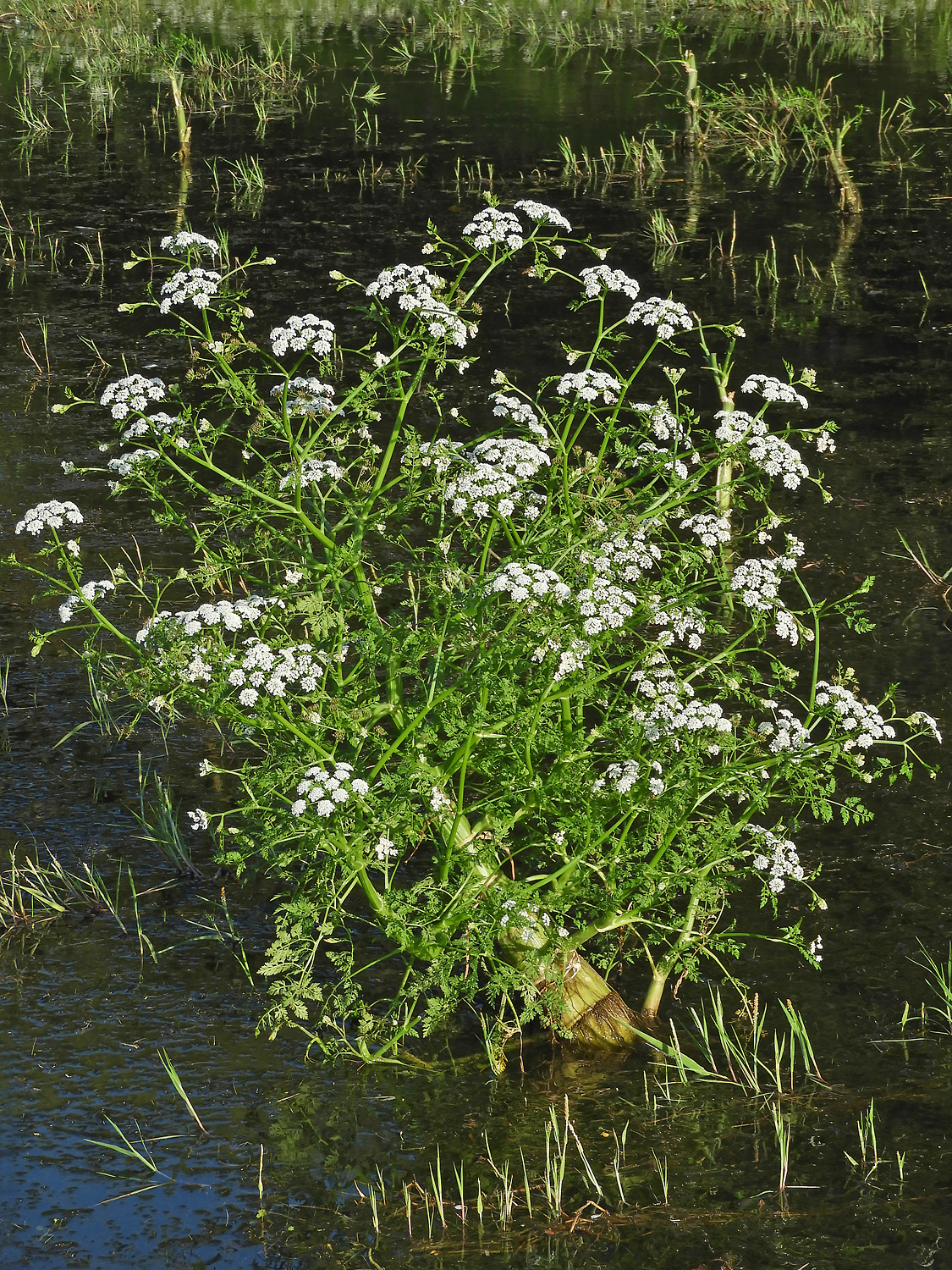
Oenanthe lachenalii or parsley water dropwort

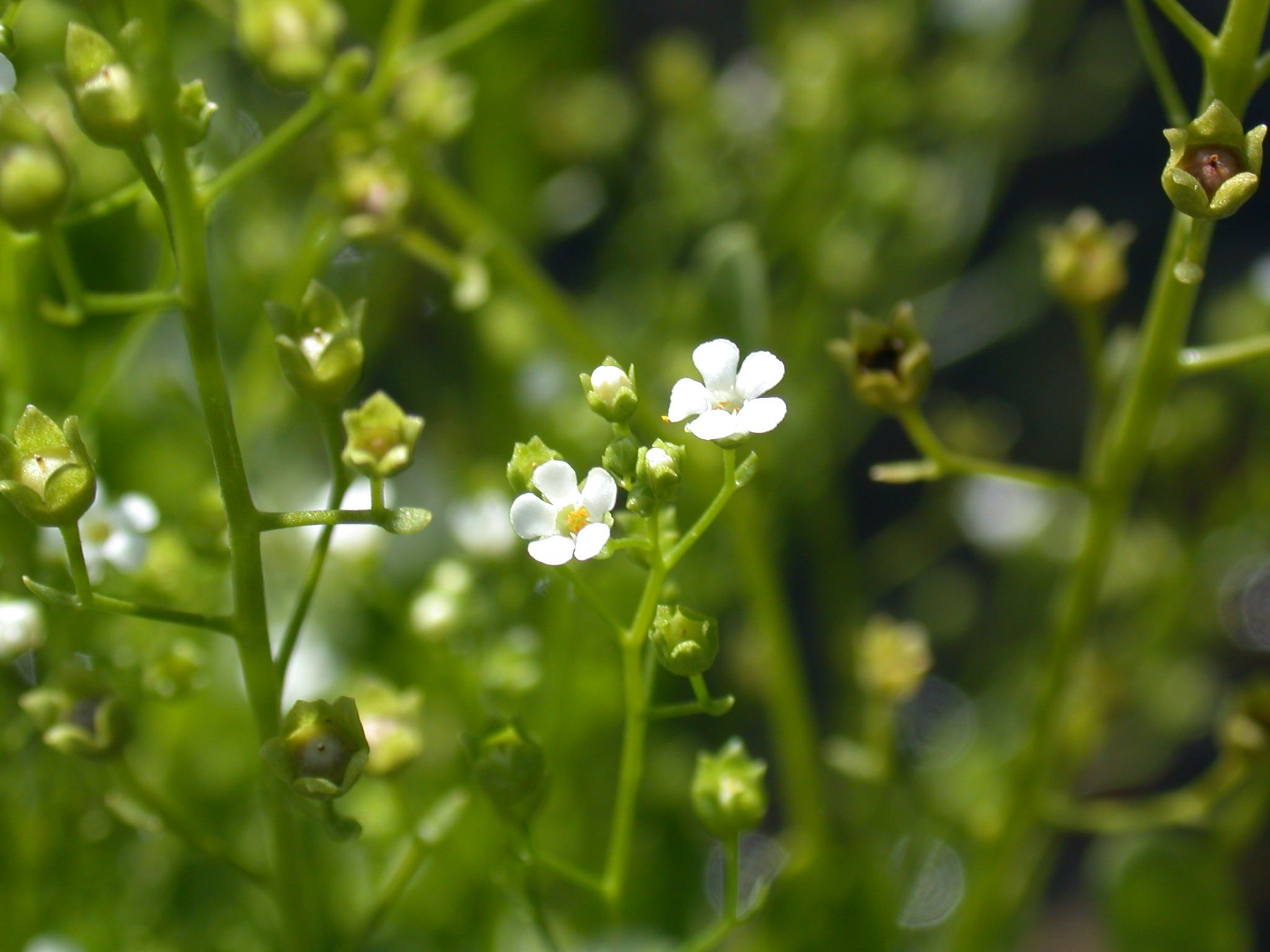
brookweed

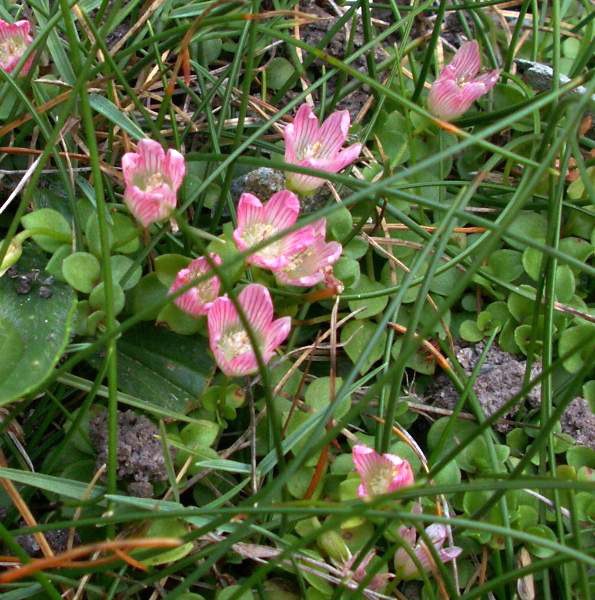
bog pimpernel

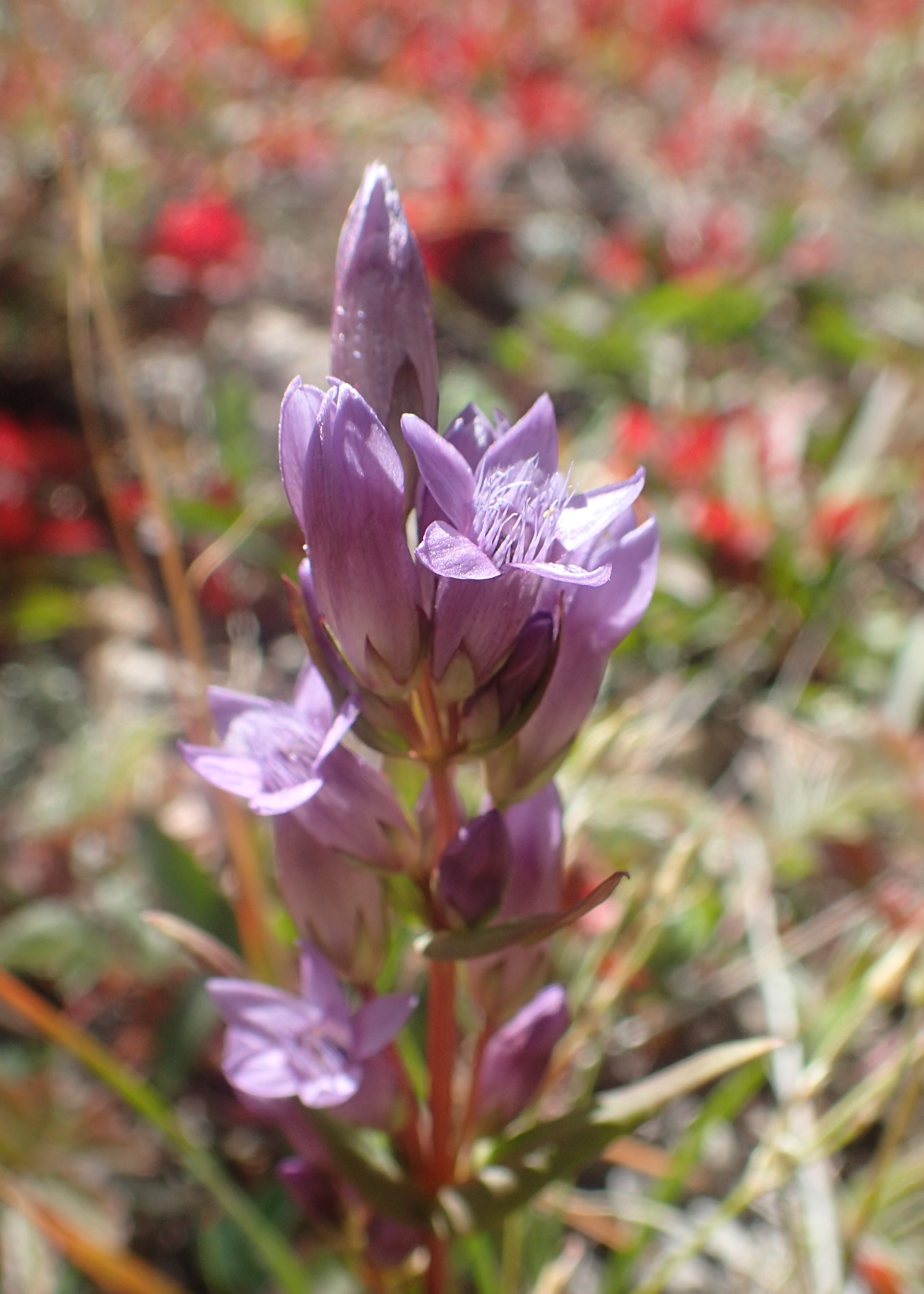
felwort or autumn gentian

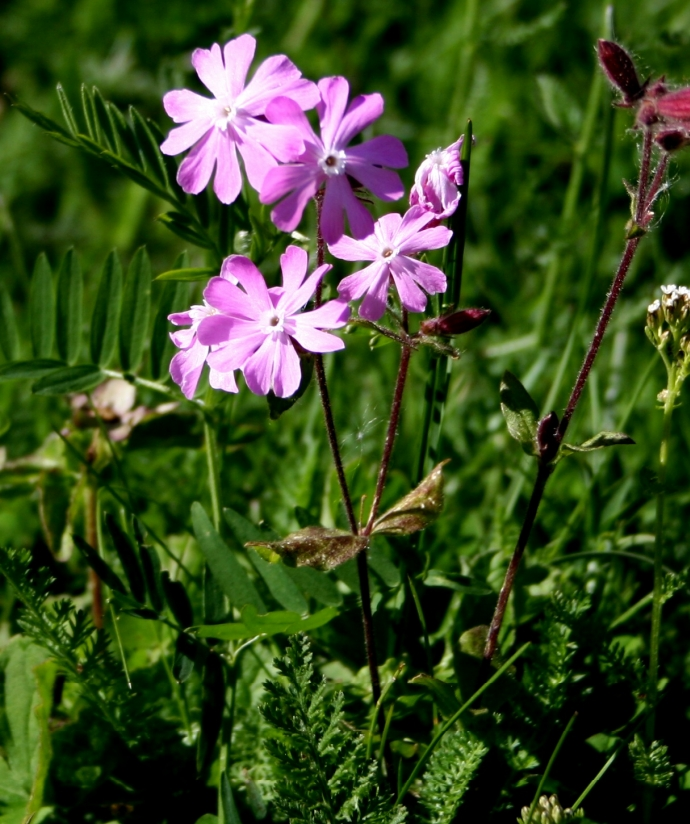
bird’s-eye primrose

=== Fauna ===
This SSSI was not designated as such for its fauna, the only mention on Natural England's assessment documents being possible rabbit nuisance in 2015. However on 9 March 1970, 60,000 starlings were reported in a hawthorn thicket on the site. (Note: Only the Starling Thicket at the site would accommodate 60,000 birds) A Bradford University student thesis lists five undated historical reports of the red fox at the site, and A History of the Bramham Hunt (1898) gives an instance of finding foxes there.

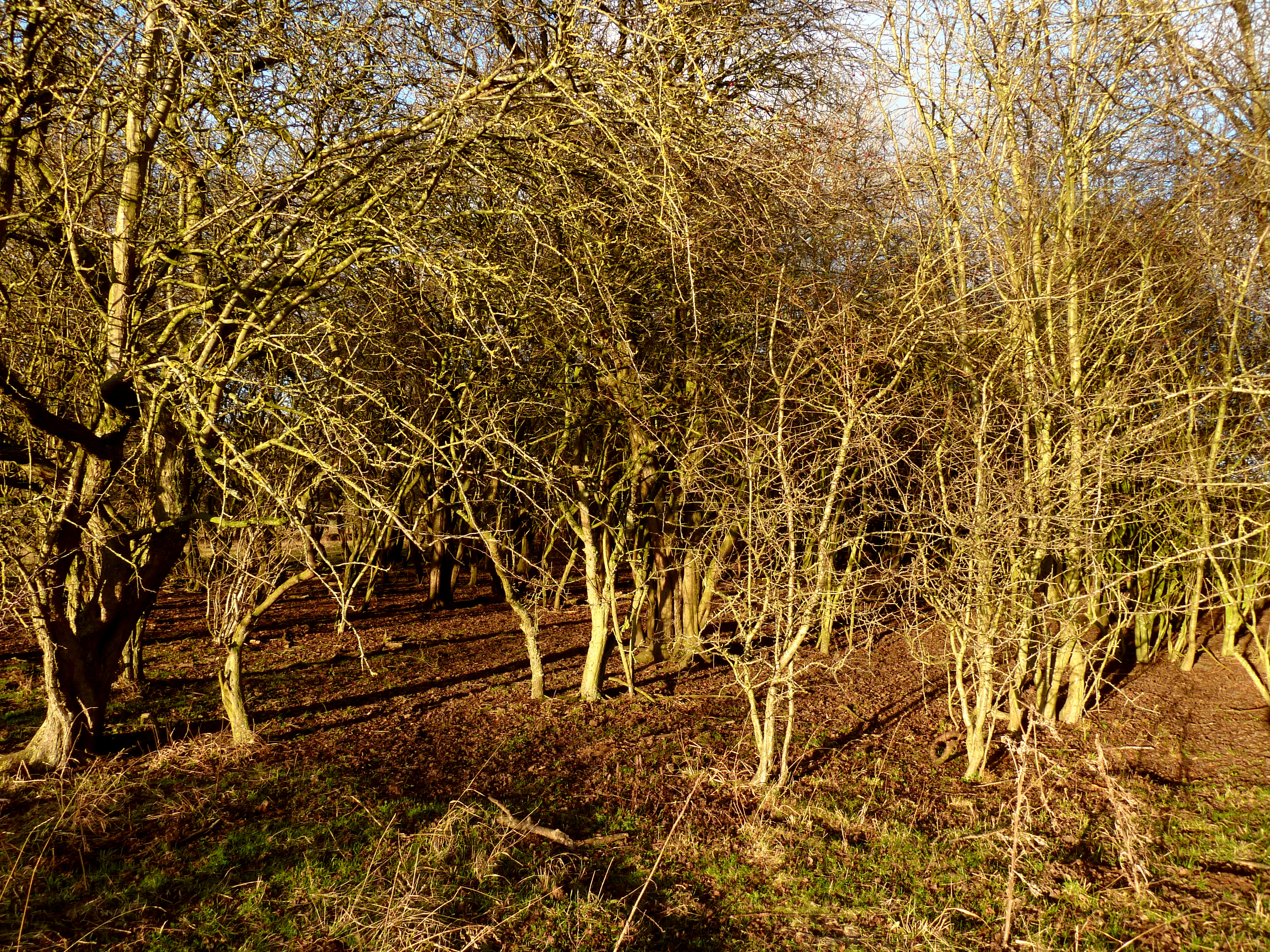
Part of Starling Thicket at Farnham Mires

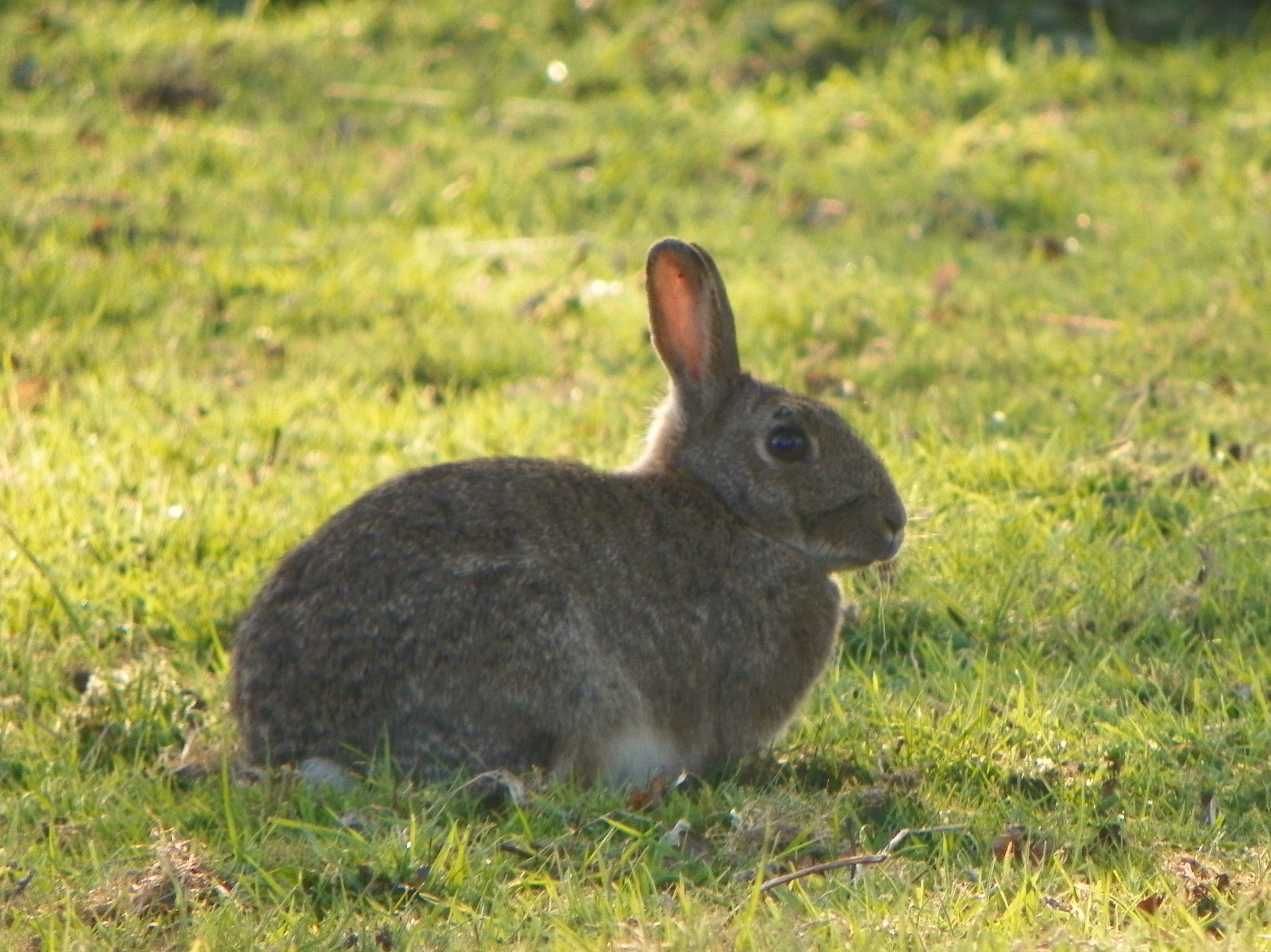
Rabbit

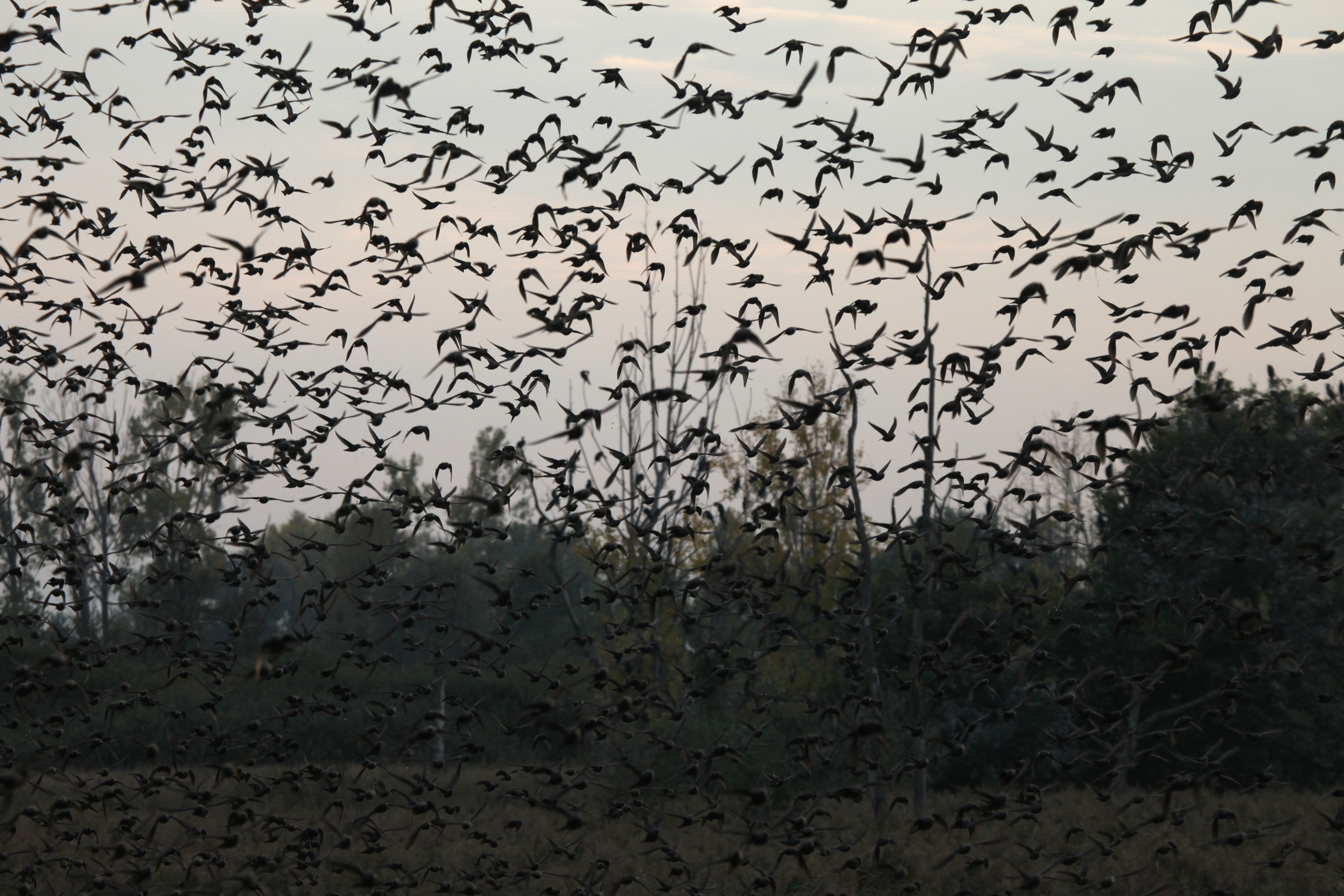
Flock of starlings in flight

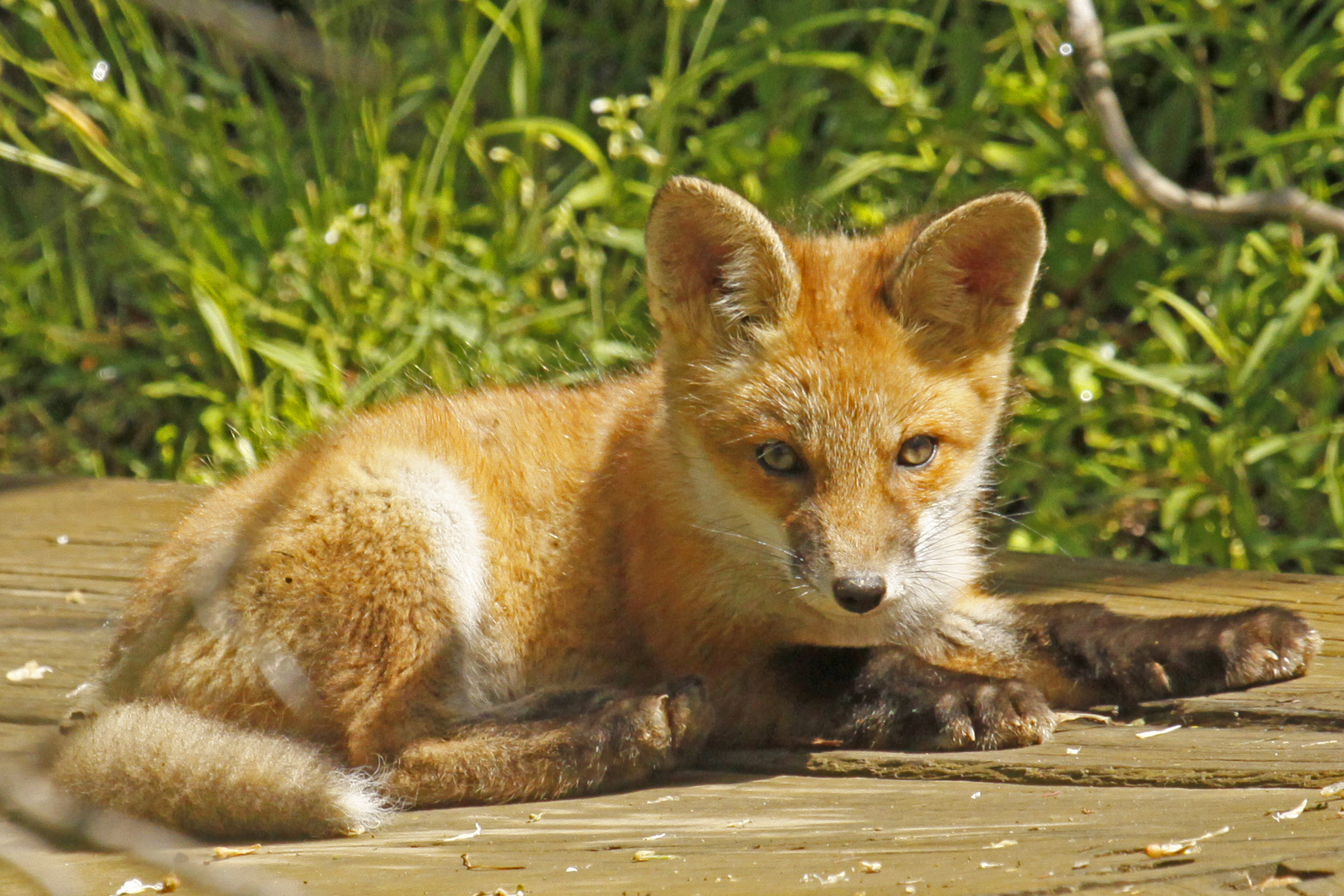
Juvenile red fox

=== Other biota ===
When Taylor and Wallace visited the site in 1943, they noticed a "rich insect fauna," and Taylor reported that in view of that virtue, together with the variety of flora then present, "it would seem that the area has a strong claim for consideration in any scheme for the creation of nature reserves."

== Maintenance ==
=== Mire ===
This is a flush and spring fen, which has to be maintained as such, to ensure continued biodiversity. This is because the minerals in the groundwater seepage at this mire support, for example, rush, sedge, liverwort and moss. Therefore the underground aquifers should not be compromised by commercial water extraction, nor should they be contaminated by heavy use of agricultural fertilisers or by industrial pollution. A little fertiliser can be used, but downhill of the springs. Light grazing should be employed to keep the springs clear, and the grasses short.

=== Grassland ===
The calcareous grassland potentially supports a large diversity of plants, but only if maintained to prevent it being overgrown with rank grasses and scrub. Light winter grazing is recommended, to promote vegetation of varying height, and that in turn will support invertebrates and other wildlife. Pesticides are discouraged to protect the diverse plant life here, but fertilisers are also discouraged because the protected plants require the naturally poor soil conditions of the calcareous grassland.

== Development and risk assessment ==
When the site was assessed in 2015, the 8.366 hectares (0.0837 km^{2}; 0.0323 sq mi) of lowland calcareous grassland was judged to be in favourable condition, but under medium threat risk. In the same year, the 1.9681 hectares (0.01968 km^{2}; 0.007599 sq mi) of lowland fen, marsh and swamp (the mire) was judged to be in unfavourable condition and recovering, but to be under a high threat risk. Regarding the grassland, the assessment notes show that the year's growth had been "eaten off," there was rabbit damage, and rushes were becoming overgrown. Some scrub management was needed. The cattle grazing in the mire area had maintained it as recommended, opening up the vegetation for growth of a variety of species. The scrub nearest to the road needed more control, but otherwise the mire was recovering at that time.

Regarding the proximity of Farnham Mires to nearby sites being considered in 2016 for sand and gravel extraction, the local councils' Minerals and Waste Joint Plan of that year recommended that checks should be made, of potential dust and air impact on this and other local SSSIs. In 2018 an application to the Environment Agency regarding the development of a poultry or pig unit was accepted for a site within 5,000 metres of Farnham Mires. The assessment for potential emissions of ammonia concluded that the risk was acceptably safe for this SSSI site. There is also a concern that a balance has to be kept between national plans for water management for flora and fauna conservation, plans for commercial use of water and for flood management, and plans for available funds.

== See also ==
Other nearby SSSIs are: Bishop Monkton Ings, Cow Myers, Hack Fall Wood, Hay-a-Park, Kirk Deighton Mar Field Fen, Quarry Moor and Ripon Parks.
