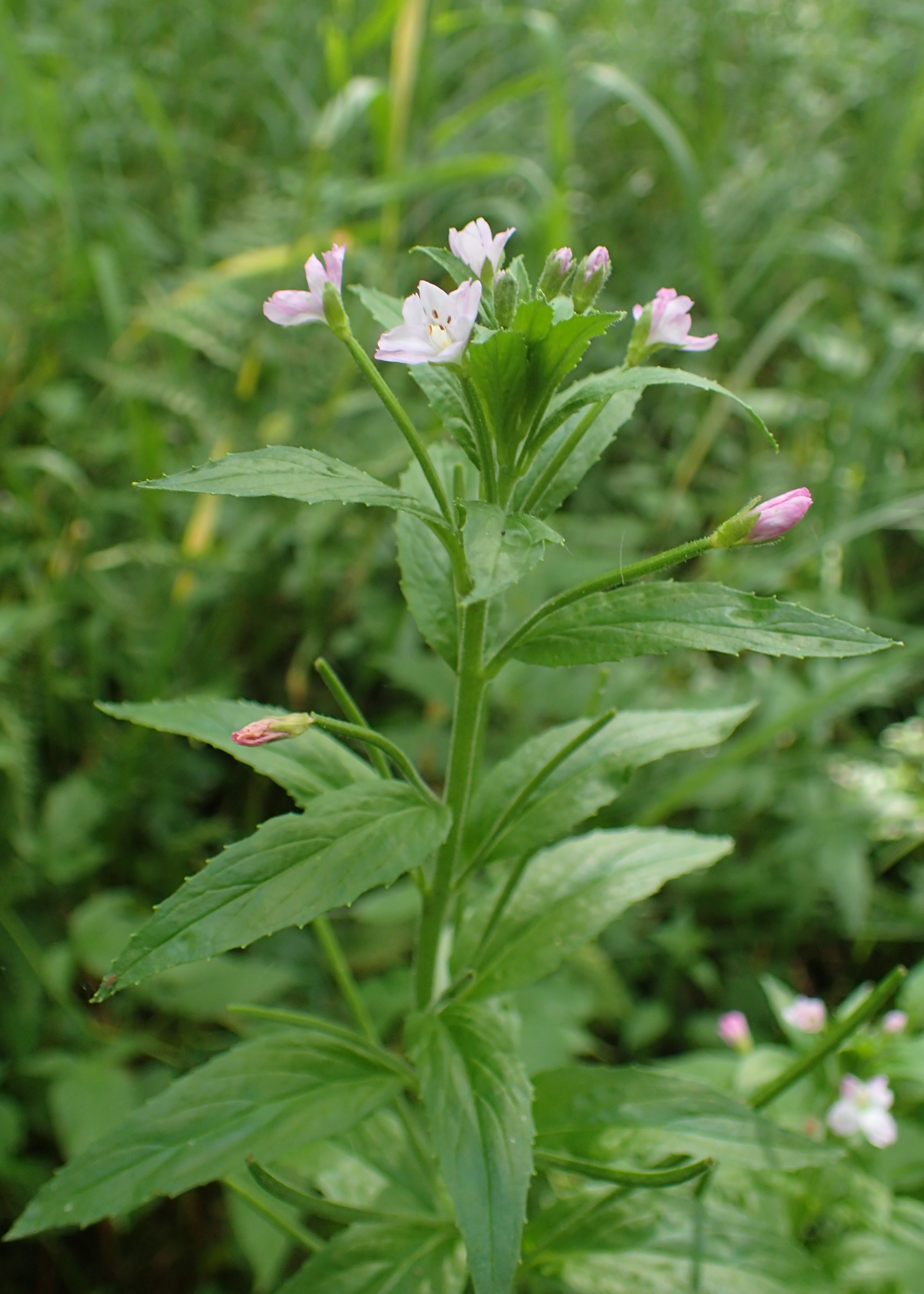

Scientific classification
- Kingdom: Plantae
- Clade: Embryophytes
- Clade: Tracheophytes
- Clade: Spermatophytes
- Clade: Angiosperms
- Clade: Eudicots
- Clade: Rosids
- Order: Myrtales
- Family: Onagraceae
- Genus: Epilobium
- Species: E. parviflorum

Binomial name
- Epilobium parviflorum (Schreb.) Schreb.

Synonyms
- Chamaenerion parviflorum; Epilobium intermedium Mérat

= Epilobium parviflorum =

Species of flowering plant

Epilobium parviflorum, commonly known as the hoary willowherb or smallflower hairy willowherb, is a herbaceous perennial plant of the family Onagraceae.

== Etymology ==
The genus name derives from the Greek words "epi" meaning "upon" and "lobos" meaning "lobe", with reference to position of the petals above the ovary. The specific Latin name of "parviflorum" means "small flowers".

== Description ==
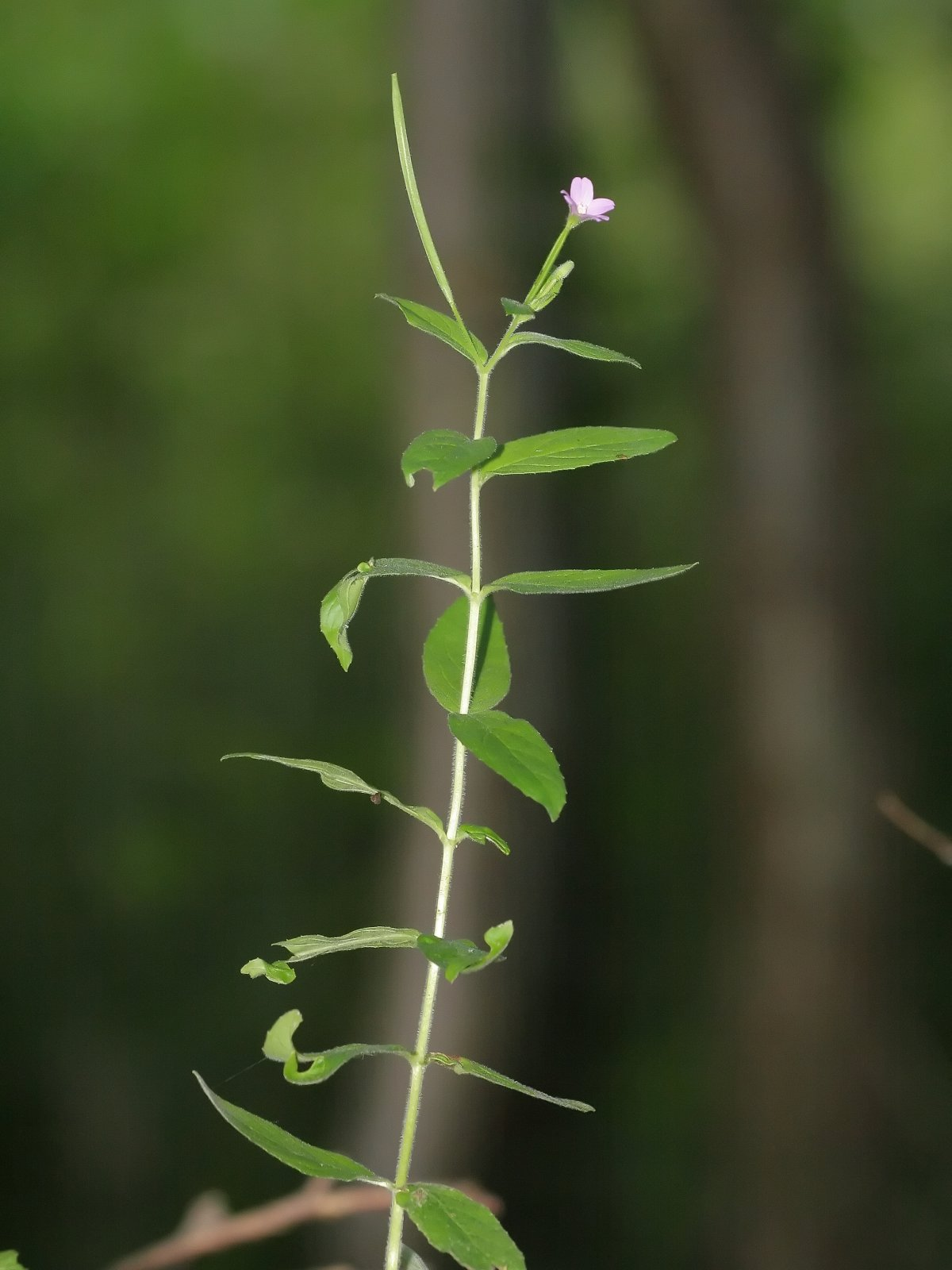
Whole plant

The biological form of Epilobium parviflorum is hemicryptophyte scapose, as its overwintering buds are situated just below the soil surface and the floral axis is more or less erect with a few leaves.

Epilobium parviflorum reaches on average 30–80 centimetres (12–31 in) in height. The stem is erect and densely covered with hairs, especially in the lower part. The leaves are opposite, unstalked but not amplexicaul, lanceolate and toothed, rounded at the base, 4–10 centimetres (1.6–3.9 in) long. The tiny flowers are pale pink or pale purple, 6–7 millimetres (0.24–0.28 in) in diameter, with four petals, eight stamens and a 4-lobed stigma. Flowering occurs from June to August in the Northern Hemisphere. The hermaphroditic flowers are either self-fertilized (autogamy) or pollinated by insects (entomogamy). Fruit is a three-to seven-centimeter long capsule containing very small black seeds (about 1 mm long), with white fibres that allow the dispersal by wind. This species is quite similar to Epilobium hirsutum, but the flowers are much smaller.

Epilobium parviflorum is sometimes mistaken for E. roseum, whose clavate stigma contrasts with the 4-lobed stigma of E. parviflorum. More obviously, the undersides of and fully developed leaves of E. parviflorum are covered with up to 0.5 millimetres (0.020 in) long unglandular trichomes. Trichomes of E. roseum are always shorter at up to 0.3 millimetres (0.012 in).

== Distribution ==
It is one of the most widespread species in its genus. It plant occurs in most of Europe, including Britain, from Sweden to Northern Africa and Western Asia up to Kashmir, in United States and Canada. In Croatia, it is found everywhere but subalpine and altimontane altitudes.

It grows in very moist to wet habitats.

== Habitat ==
It prefers marshes and swamps, moist mountain meadows and slopes, at an average altitude of 0–1,400 metres (0.0–4,600 ft) above sea level, with a maximum of 2,500 metres (8,200 ft).

== Medicinal uses ==
Extracts of this plant have been used by traditional medicine in disorders of the prostate gland, bladder and kidney, having an antioxidant and antiinflammatory effect . Epilobium parviflorum herb has been prescribed internally as tea in the traditional Austrian medicine for treatment of disorders of the prostate, kidneys, and urinary tract. Extracts of Epilobium have been shown to inhibit proliferation of human prostate cells in-vitro by affecting progression of the cell cycle.

== Bibliography ==
- Strgulc Krajšek, Sumona; Šegedin, Tamara; Jogan, Nejc (30 June 2009). "Revision of Epilobium and Chamerion in the Croatian herbaria ZA and ZAHO". Natura Croatica. 18 (1): 155–167. eISSN 1848-7386.
- Tutin, T.G. et al. - Flora Europaea, second edition - 1993
