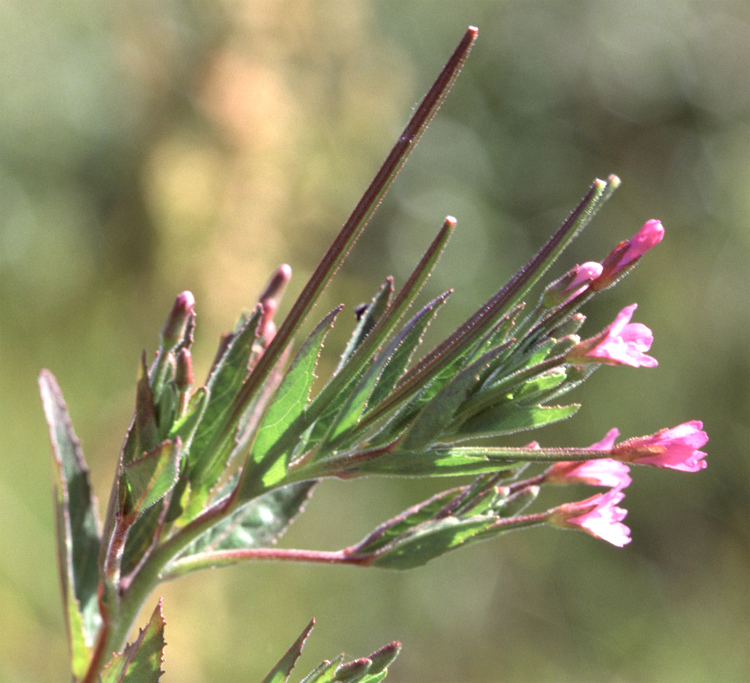
- Epilobium ciliatum subsp. watsonii

Conservation status
- Secure (NatureServe)

Scientific classification
- Kingdom: Plantae
- Clade: Tracheophytes
- Clade: Angiosperms
- Clade: Eudicots
- Clade: Rosids
- Order: Myrtales
- Family: Onagraceae
- Genus: Epilobium
- Species: E. ciliatum

Binomial name
- Epilobium ciliatum Raf.

Subspecies
- E. c. subsp. ciliatum; E. c. subsp. glandulosum; E. c. subsp. watsonii

Synonyms
- List: Chamaenerion dominii Nábělek; Epilobium aconcaguinum Phil.; Epilobium adenocaulon Hausskn.; Epilobium affine Bong.; Epilobium alaskae H.Lév.; Epilobium albiflorum Phil.; Epilobium americanum Hausskn.; Epilobium argentium Sam.; Epilobium bergianum A.K.Skvortsov; Epilobium bifarium Kom.; Epilobium boreale Hausskn.; Epilobium brevistylum Barbey; Epilobium caesiovirens Sam.; Epilobium californicum Hausskn.; Epilobium chilense Hausskn.; Epilobium cinerascens Piper; Epilobium congdonii H.Lév.; Epilobium constrictum Sam.; Epilobium cunninghamii Hausskn.; Epilobium delicatum Trel.; Epilobium deminutum Sam.; Epilobium dominii Popov; Epilobium doriphyllum Hausskn.; Epilobium ecomosum (Fassett) Fernald; Epilobium fendleri Hausskn.; Epilobium franciscanum Barbey; Epilobium glandulosum Lehm.; Epilobium griseum Suksd.; Epilobium holosericeum Trel.; Epilobium hookerianum Hausskn. & Skottsb.; Epilobium kurilense Nakai; Epilobium leiophyton Sam.; Epilobium leptocarpum subsp. macounii (Trel.) Piper & Beattie; Epilobium longipes Sam.; Epilobium lorentzianum Hausskn.; Epilobium macdougalii Rydb.; Epilobium magellanicum Phil. & Hausskn.; Epilobium mexicanum Ser.; Epilobium mexicanum var. paulsenii H.Lév.; Epilobium montezumae Sam.; Epilobium novomexicanum Hausskn.; Epilobium occidentale (Trel.) Rydb.; Epilobium ostenfeldii H.Lév.; Epilobium ovale Takeda; Epilobium ovatum Phil. ex Hausskn.; Epilobium pallidiglandulosum Bomble; Epilobium palmeri H.Lév.; Epilobium parishii Trel.; Epilobium perplexans (Trel.) Trel. ex A.Nelson; Epilobium praecox Suksd.; Epilobium pseudolineare Hausskn.; Epilobium pseudorubescens A.K.Skvortsov; Epilobium repens Schltdl.; Epilobium sandbergii Rydb.; Epilobium santa-cruzense Dusén; Epilobium santa-cruzense var. cruzense Dusén; Epilobium valdiviense Hausskn.; Epilobium watsonii Barbey

= Epilobium ciliatum =

Plant species in the willowherb family

Epilobium ciliatum, known by the common names fringed willowherb, American willowherb, slender willow herb, and northern willow herb is a species of flowering plant in the willowherb family Onagraceae. This species is native to much of North America, southern South America, and East Asia. It is an introduced species in much of Eurasia and Australia.

This perennial herbaceous plant usually occurs in wetlands, but may be found in a great variety of habitats, including disturbed areas and roadsides, at elevations below 1,400 metres (4,600 ft).

== Description ==
Epilobium ciliatum is a clumping perennial often exceeding 1.5 metres (5 ft) in height. It has thickly veined lance-shaped leaves which may be up to 15 centimeters long toward the base of the plant. The foliage, stem, and inflorescence are covered in bristly hairs and glands.

There are four sepals. The regular, trumpet-shaped flowers have four petals which are so deeply notched they look like four pairs. They are white to light purple or pink with dark veining. There are eight stamens and a club-shaped stigma. The fruit is a narrow, hairy, four-chambered capsule up to 10 centimeters in length which may be held on a long stalk. The seeds are downy and can float for long distances with the wind.

=== Subspecies ===
Three subspecies are currently recognized:

- Epilobium ciliatum ssp. ciliatum
- Epilobium ciliatum ssp. glandulosum — (Lehm.) Hoch & P.H.Raven
- Epilobium ciliatum ssp. watsonii — (Barbey) Hoch & P.H.Raven

=== Taxonomy ===
Epilobium ciliatum may be a cryptic species complex. The Rocky Mountain Willowherb (Epilobium saximontanum) is sometimes included as yet another subspecies.

The three currently recognized subspecies may each constitute a distinct species. If so, E. ciliatum ssp. watsonii would perhaps use the name E. adenocaulon and include those populations, while E. ciliatum ssp. glandulosum would perhaps use the name E. bergianum and include those populations. The others named E. ciliatum ssp. ciliatum populations would remain.

== Distribution and habitat ==
Epilobium ciliatum is native to the southern part of Canada and most of the United States of America. It is a plant of moist places, stream-sides, ditches, ponds, gardens, roadsides, recently cleared areas and wasteland.

=== Invasiveness ===
It arrived in northern Europe early in the 20th century and spread rapidly, reaching Finland in about 1920. It reached Slovenia by 1993 and Zagorje, Croatia by 2001. In Europe, Epilobium ciliatum competes with and is often found together with Epilobium roseum, which prefers a similar habitat.

== Bibliography ==
- Strgulc Krajšek, Sumona; Šegedin, Tamara; Jogan, Nejc (2009-06-30). "Revision of Epilobium and Chamerion in the Croatian herbaria ZA and ZAHO". Natura Croatica. 18 (1): 155–167. eISSN 1848-7386.
