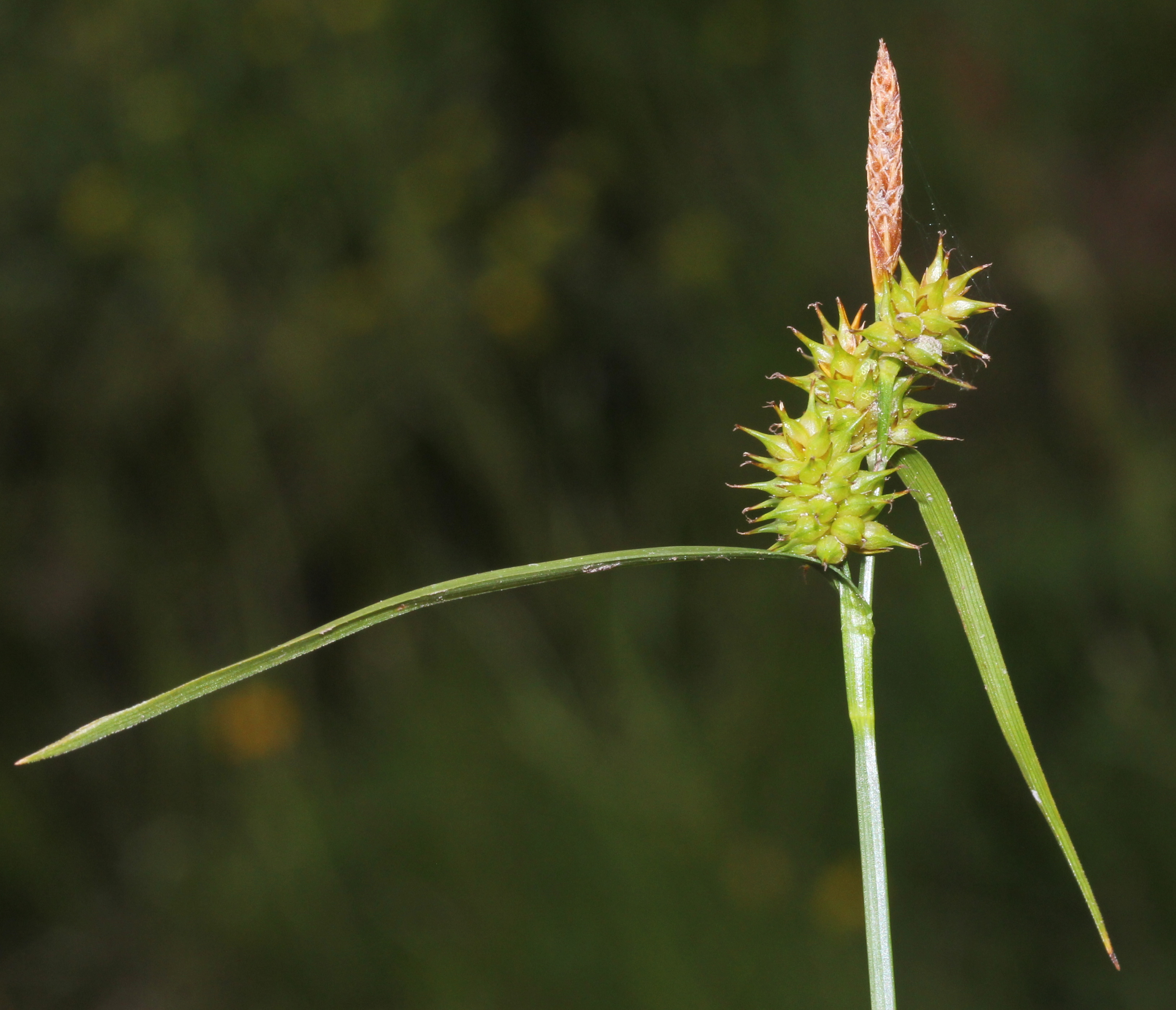
- Inflorescence

Scientific classification
- Kingdom: Plantae
- Clade: Tracheophytes
- Clade: Angiosperms
- Clade: Monocots
- Clade: Commelinids
- Order: Poales
- Family: Cyperaceae
- Genus: Carex
- Species: C. lepidocarpa

Binomial name
- Carex lepidocarpa Tausch

Synonyms
- List: Carex flava var. elatior Schltdl.; Carex flava subsp. jemtlandica (Palmgr.) P.D.Sell; Carex flava var. nelmesiana (Raymond) B.Boivin; Carex flava subsp. scotica (E.W.Davies) P.D.Sell; Carex jemtlandica (Palmgr.) Palmgr.; Carex lepidocarpa var. nelmesiana Raymond; Carex lipsiensis Peterm.; Carex mairei subsp. nevadensis (Boiss. & Reut.) Malag.; Carex nevadensis Boiss. & Reut.; Carex oederi Willk.; Carex pyriformis Tausch ex F.W.Schultz; Carex viridula subsp. brachyrrhyncha (Celak.) B.Schmid; Carex viridula var. elatior (Schltdl.) Crins; Carex viridula var. jemtlandica (Palmgr.) Blackst. & P.A.Ashton; Carex viridula var. lepidocarpa (Tausch) B.Schmid; Carex viridula subsp. nevadensis (Boiss. & Reut.) B.Schmid; Carex viridula var. nevadensis (Boiss. & Reut.) Crins; Carex viridula var. scotica (E.W.Davies) B.Schmid

= Carex lepidocarpa =

Species of grass-like plant

Carex lepidocarpa, called the long-stalked yellow-sedge, is a species of flowering plant in the genus Carex, native to eastern Canada, Morocco, and most of Europe. It is a member of the Carex flava species complex.

== Subtaxa ==
The following subspecies are currently accepted:

- Carex lepidocarpa subsp. ferraria Jim.-Mejías & Martín-Bravo – Atlas Mountains of Morocco
- Carex lepidocarpa subsp. jemtlandica Palmgr. – north and northeast Europe
- Carex lepidocarpa subsp. lepidocarpa
- Carex lepidocarpa subsp. nevadensis (Boiss. & Reut.) Luceño – southeast Spain
- Carex lepidocarpa subsp. scotica E.W.Davies – Scotland
