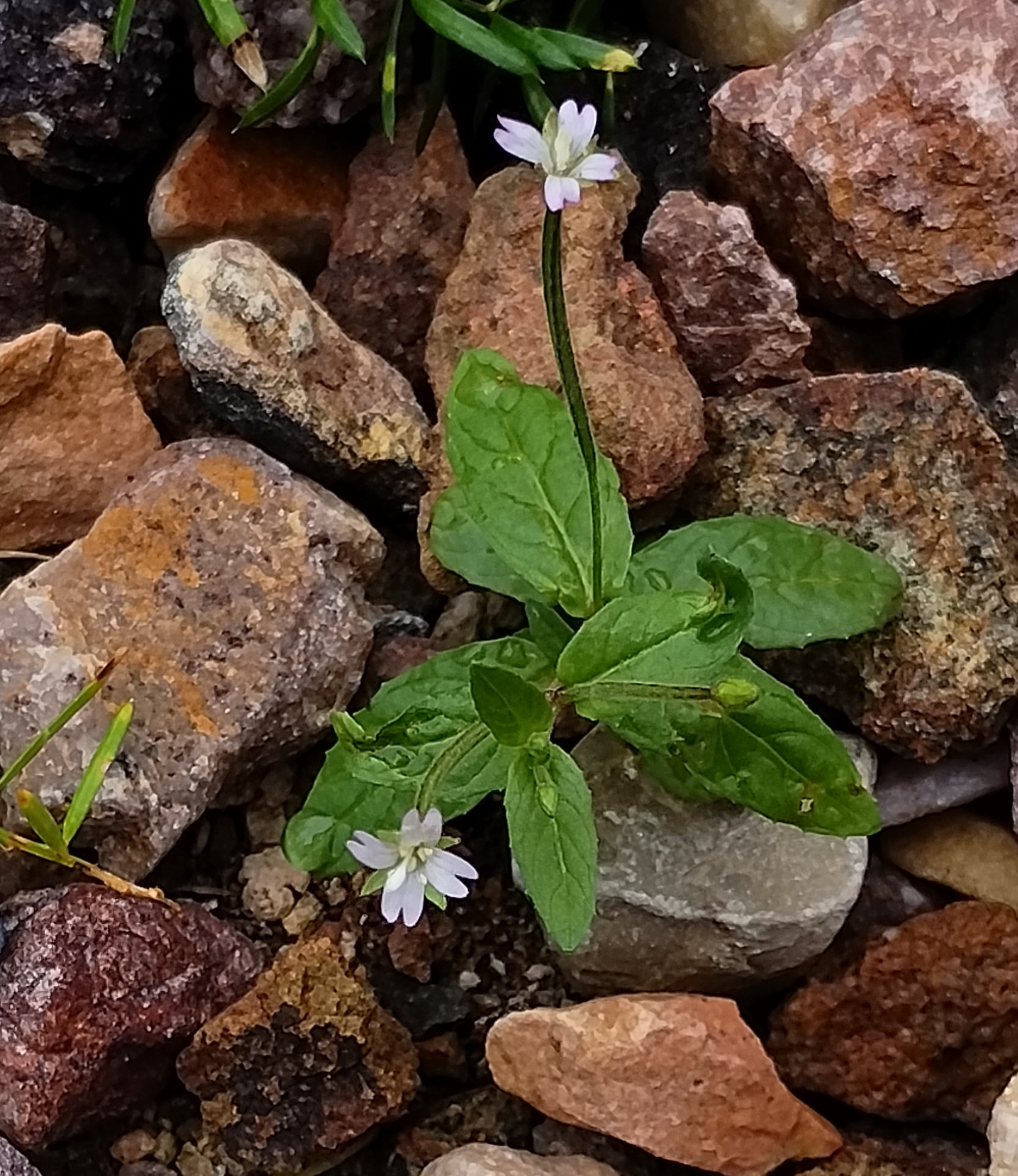

Scientific classification
- Kingdom: Plantae
- Clade: Tracheophytes
- Clade: Angiosperms
- Clade: Eudicots
- Clade: Rosids
- Order: Myrtales
- Family: Onagraceae
- Genus: Epilobium
- Species: E. roseum

Binomial name
- Epilobium roseum (Schreb.) Schreb.

= Epilobium roseum =

Species of flowering plant

The pale willowherb (Epilobium roseum) is a species of flowering plant belonging to the family Onagraceae.

== Description ==
E. roseum can be difficult to distinguish from other species, for which reason it has been mistaken from Epilobium ciliatum, E. hirsutum, E. montanum and E. obscurum.

== Distribution and habitat ==
E. roseum's native range is Europe to China. It is a common species in lowlands, especially on moist ruderal sites.

== Bibliography ==
- Strgulc Krajšek, Sumona; Šegedin, Tamara; Jogan, Nejc (2009-06-30). "Revision of Epilobium and Chamerion in the Croatian herbaria ZA and ZAHO". Natura Croatica. 18 (1): 155–167. eISSN 1848-7386.
