= List of Myrtales of Montana =

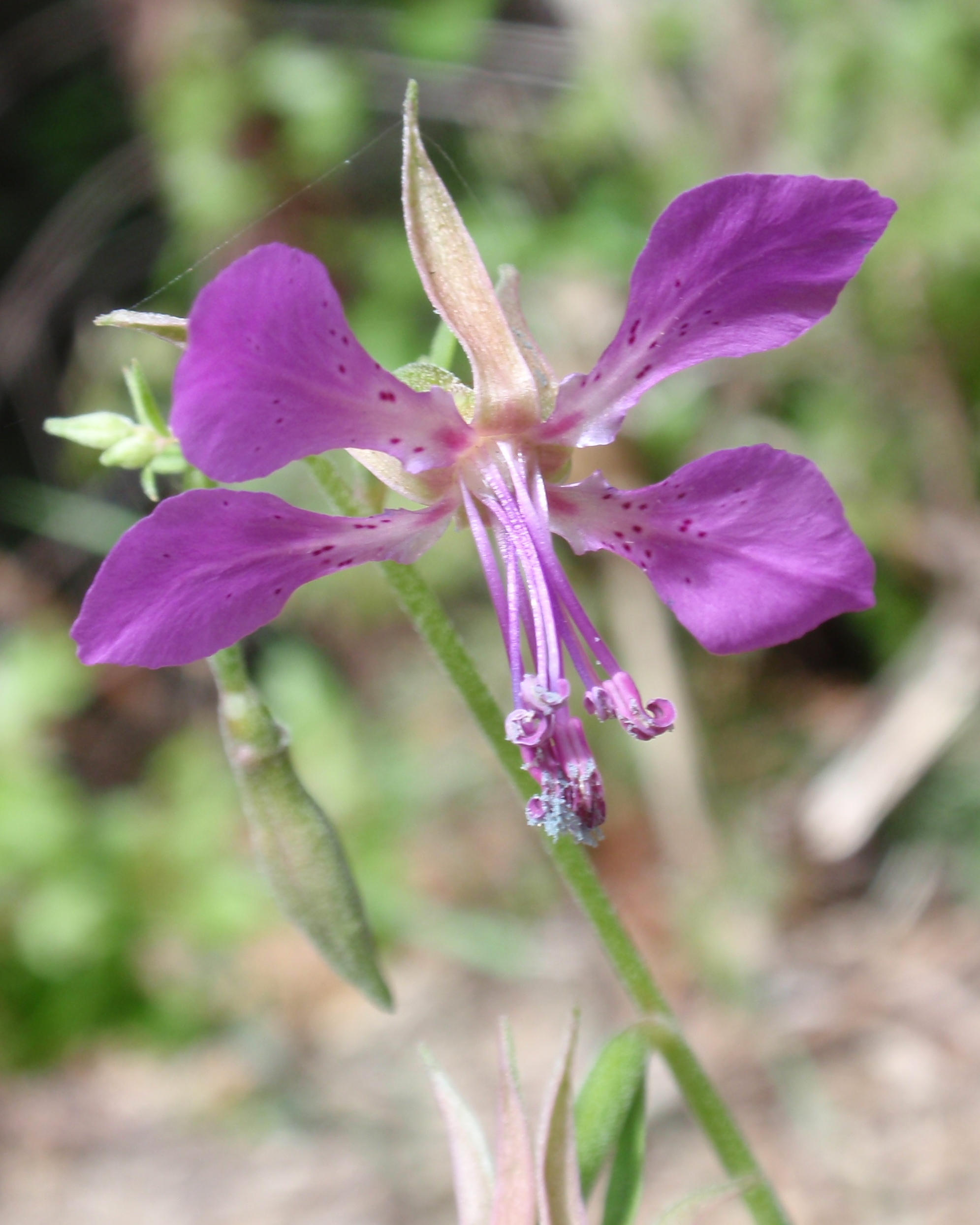
Diamond clarkia, Clarkia rhomboidea

There are at least 56 members of the evening-primrose and loosestrife order, Myrtales, found in Montana. Some of these species are exotics (not native to Montana) and some species have been designated as Species of Concern.

== Evening-primrose ==
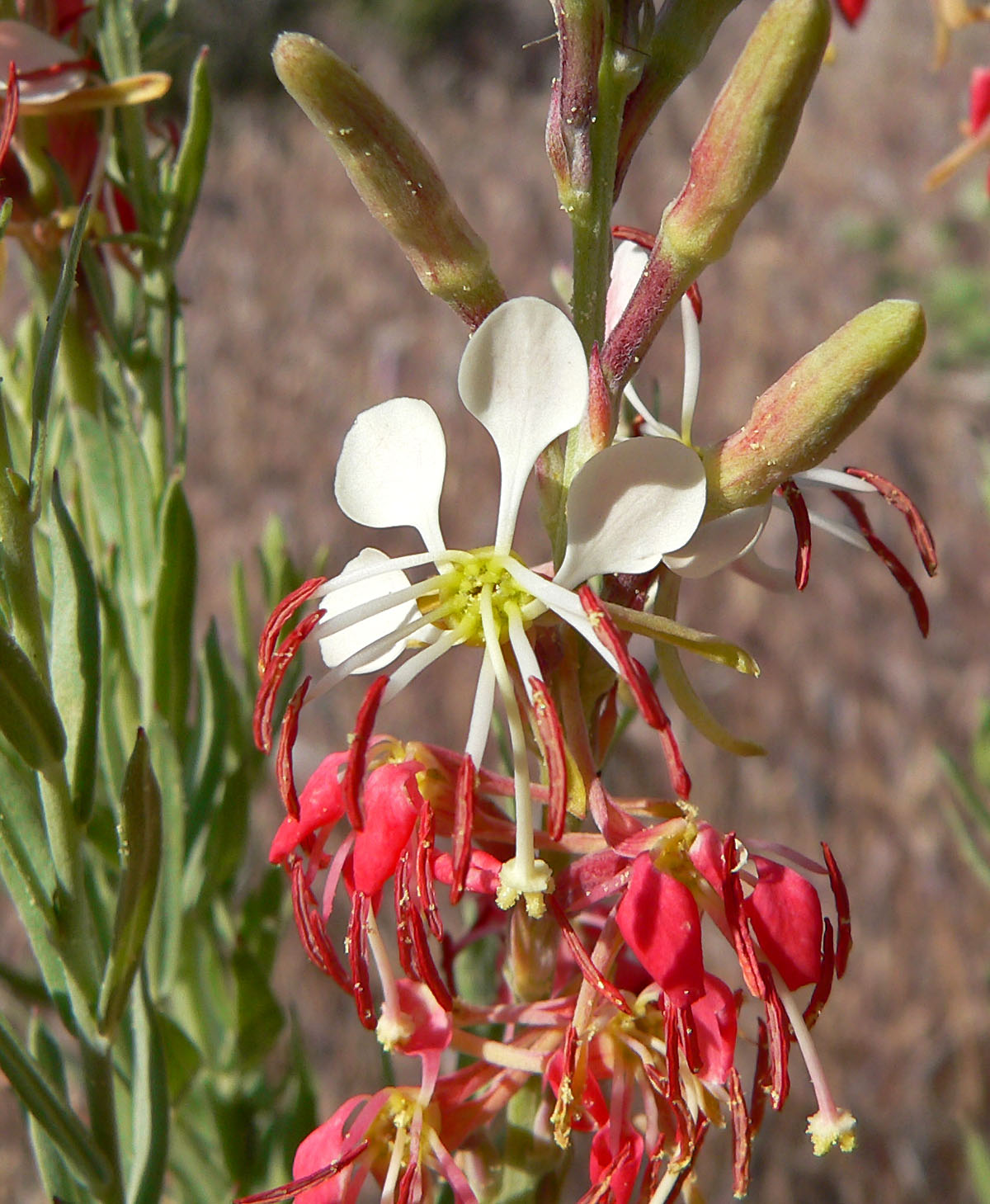
Scarlet gaura, Gaura coccinea

Family: Onagraceae

- Calylophus serrulatus, yellow evening primrose
- Camissonia andina, obscure evening-primrose
- Camissonia breviflora, short-flower evening-primrose
- Camissonia minor, small-flowered evening-primrose
- Camissonia parvula, small camissonia
- Camissonia scapoidea, naked-stemmed evening-primrose
- Camissonia subacaulis, long-leaf evening-primrose
- Camissonia tanacetifolia, tansy-leaf evening-primrose
- Circaea alpina, small enchanter's-nightshade
- Circaea alpina subsp. alpina, small enchanter's-nightshade
- Circaea alpina subsp. pacifica, small enchanter's-nightshade
- Clarkia pulchella, large-flower clarkia
- Clarkia rhomboidea, diamond clarkia
- Epilobium anagallidifolium, alpine willowherb
- Epilobium angustifolium, fireweed
- Epilobium brachycarpum, panicled willowherb
- Epilobium ciliatum, hairy willowherb
- Epilobium ciliatum subsp. ciliatum, fringed willowherb
- Epilobium ciliatum subsp. glandulosum, fringed willowherb
- Epilobium clavatum, clavate-fruit willowherb
- Epilobium densiflorum, dense spike-primrose
- Epilobium foliosum, california willowherb
- Epilobium glaberrimum, glaucous willowherb
- Epilobium halleanum, glandular willowherb
- Epilobium hornemannii, hornemann's willowherb
- Epilobium lactiflorum, white-flower willowherb
- Epilobium latifolium, dwarf fireweed
- Epilobium leptocarpum, slender-fruited willowherb
- Epilobium minutum, small-flower willowherb
- Epilobium oregonense, oregon willow-herb
- Epilobium palustre, marsh willowherb
- Epilobium palustre var. gracile, linear-leaved willowherb
- Epilobium palustre var. palustre, marsh willowherb
- Epilobium pygmaeum, smooth spike-primrose
- Epilobium saximontanum, rocky mountain willowherb
- Epilobium suffruticosum, shrubby willowherb
- Gaura coccinea, scarlet gaura
- Gaura parviflora, velvet-leaved gaura
- Gayophytum decipiens, deceptive groundsmoke
- Gayophytum diffusum, diffuse groundsmoke
- Gayophytum humile, low groundsmoke
- Gayophytum racemosum, racemed groundsmoke
- Gayophytum ramosissimum, much-branch groundsmoke
- Oenothera albicaulis, prairie evening-primrose
- Oenothera caespitosa, tufted evening-primrose
- Oenothera elata, hooker's evening-primrose
- Oenothera flava, long-tubed evening-primrose
- Oenothera nuttallii, white-stemmed evening-primrose
- Oenothera pallida subsp. pallida, pale evening-primrose
- Oenothera perennis, small sundrops
- Oenothera villosa, hairy evening-primrose

== Loosestrife ==
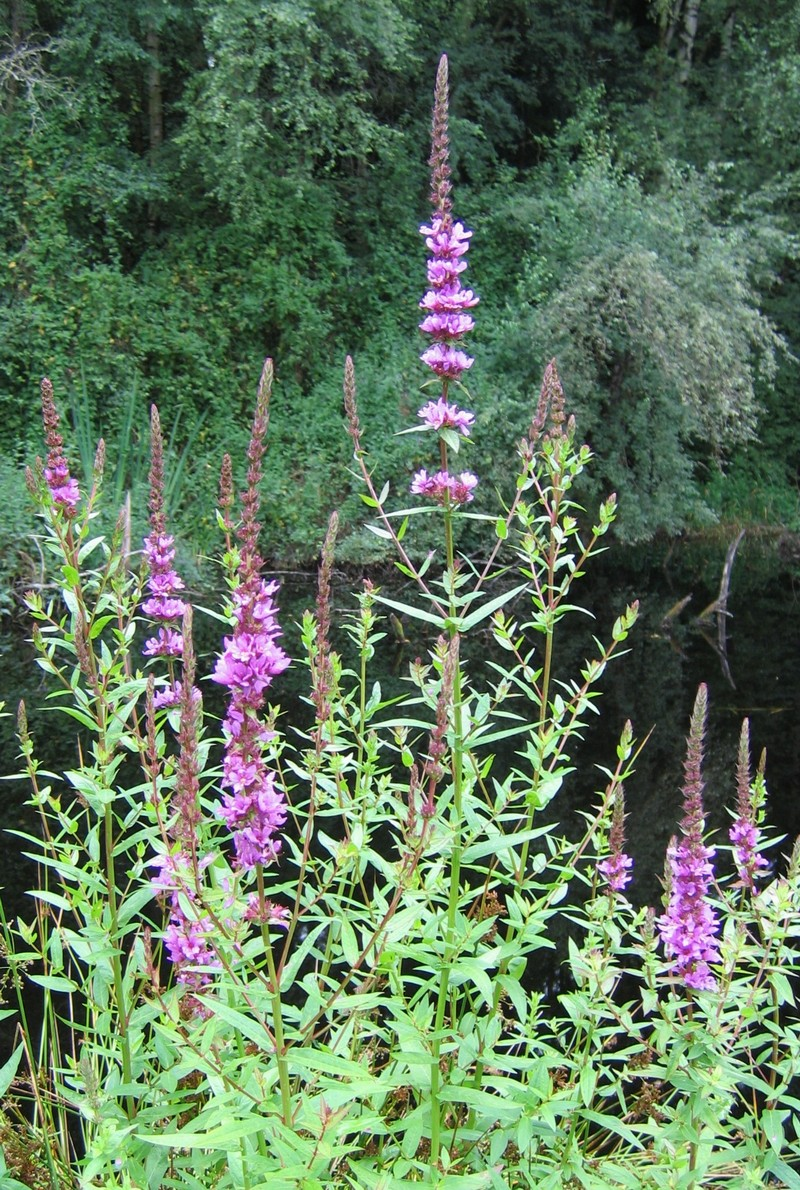
Purple loosestrife, Lythrum salicaria

Family: Lythraceae

- Ammannia robusta, scarlet ammannia
- Lythrum alatum, winged-loosestrife
- Lythrum salicaria, purple loosestrife
- Rotala ramosior, toothcup

== Mezereum ==
Family: Thymelaeaceae

- Daphne mezereum, paradise plant

== See also ==
- List of dicotyledons of Montana
