= Hypericum calcicola =

Scientific classification
- Kingdom: Plantae
- Clade: Tracheophytes
- Clade: Angiosperms
- Clade: Eudicots
- Clade: Rosids
- Order: Malpighiales
- Family: Hypericaceae
- Genus: Hypericum
- Section: Hypericum sect. Thornea
- Species: H. calcicola

Binomial name
- Hypericum calcicola Standl. & Steyerm.

Species of flowering plant

Hypericum calcicola is a species of flowering plant of the St. John's wort family Hypericaceae. It is a perennial herb with dense branches that can grow up to 3 meters (9.8 ft) tall. The species has small leaves and pink or rose red petals. Originally described in 1944, it was later moved into the genus Thornea, only to be returned to Hypericum when Thornea was demoted to sectional status. Found in Guatemala and Mexico, the plant grows on limestone bluffs in the Sierra de los Cuchumatanes mountain range. It often becomes dominant in its ecosystem, and grows alongside a variety of other trees and shrubs.

== Etymology ==
One origin of the genus name Hypericum is that it is derived from the Greek words hyper (above) and eikon (picture), in reference to the tradition of hanging the plant over religious icons in the home. According to Rye, the specific epithet calcicola is derived from the Latin words calcis ("limestone") and cola ("inhabitant"), and refers to the habitat of the plant. The Latin word for "limestone" is however calx and the word for "inhabitant" is incola.

== Description ==
Hypericum calcicola is a perennial herb with dense branches which lacks hairs (is glabrous). It grows upright, usually 30–60 centimeters (12–24 in) tall but up to 3 meters (9.8 ft) tall. It has many short lateral branches, and the older branches are a blackish color while the younger are more reddish.

The leaves are small, and are an oblong to oval shape. They have a short leaf stalk and are placed opposite one another on the stem. They are a somewhat leathery texture, and are 0.5–1.5 cm long and 0.2–0.6 cm wide. On the underside of the leaf, there is a visible net of veins. The flowers are placed at the ends of branches, and have a short and slender pedicel. There are four ovate sepals that are around 0.2 cm long. The petals are pink to rose red, and are 0.5–0.7 cm long. There are three styles that are around 0.2 cm long. The seed capsule is around 0.5 cm long, and there are few seeds that are around 0.1 cm long.

The wood of H. calcicola is porous and diffuse, with faintly visible growth rings. The wood tissue lacks axial parenchyma, but does have both uniseriate and multiseriate rays.

It is distinguished from its sister species Hypericum matudae by having more dense branches, shorter internodes, leathery instead of papery leaf texture, and smaller petals and seed capsules. When it was first described, its resemblance to Symphoricarpos microphyllus was pointed out.

== Taxonomy ==
Hypericum calcicola was originally described by Paul Standley and Julian Steyermark in 1944. After several collections of the species and Hypericum matudae, Dennis Breedlove and Elizabeth McClintock established a new genus named Thornea for the two species. Thus, Breedlove and McClintock authored the new combination Thornea calcicola. In 2016, following a review of phylogenetic studies on the family Hypericaceae that suggested Thornea was not an independent genus, Norman Robson restored Thornea calcicola to Hypericum under the new Hypericum sect. Thornea. Following that classification, the placement of H. calcicola can be summarized as follows:

Hypericum

Hypericum sect. Thornea

H. calcicola – H. matudae

Hypericum calcicola was used as an outgroup in a 2018 phylogenetic study of some Andean Hypericum species, and had its DNA sequenced at that time. It was again used as an outgroup in a 2023 phylogenetic study of several Hypericum species, this time under the name Thornea calcicola.

== Distribution, habitat, and ecology ==
The holotype of the Hypericum calcicola was collected in its type locality of Huehuetenango, Guatemala, in 1942. It is distributed across Guatemala and southeast Mexico. It is commonly found on limestone bluffs, and particularly on the mountain peaks of the Sierra de los Cuchumatanes range at an altitude of 3,700 meters (12,100 ft). It grows in the Montane rainforest ecosystem, especially on the lake shores of Lagunas de Montebello National Park. Hypericum calcicola often becomes somewhat dominant in its ecosystem, where it grows alongside numerous trees and shrubs. (Note: Rondeletia stenosiphon, Podocarpus matudae, Cavendishia laurifolia, Saurauia scabrida, Lyonia squamulosa, Hoffmannia, Daphnopsis, Tibouchina breedlovei, Monnina xalapense, Hauya heydeana, Zanthoxylon, Parathesis chiapensis, and Miconia laurifolia.)
