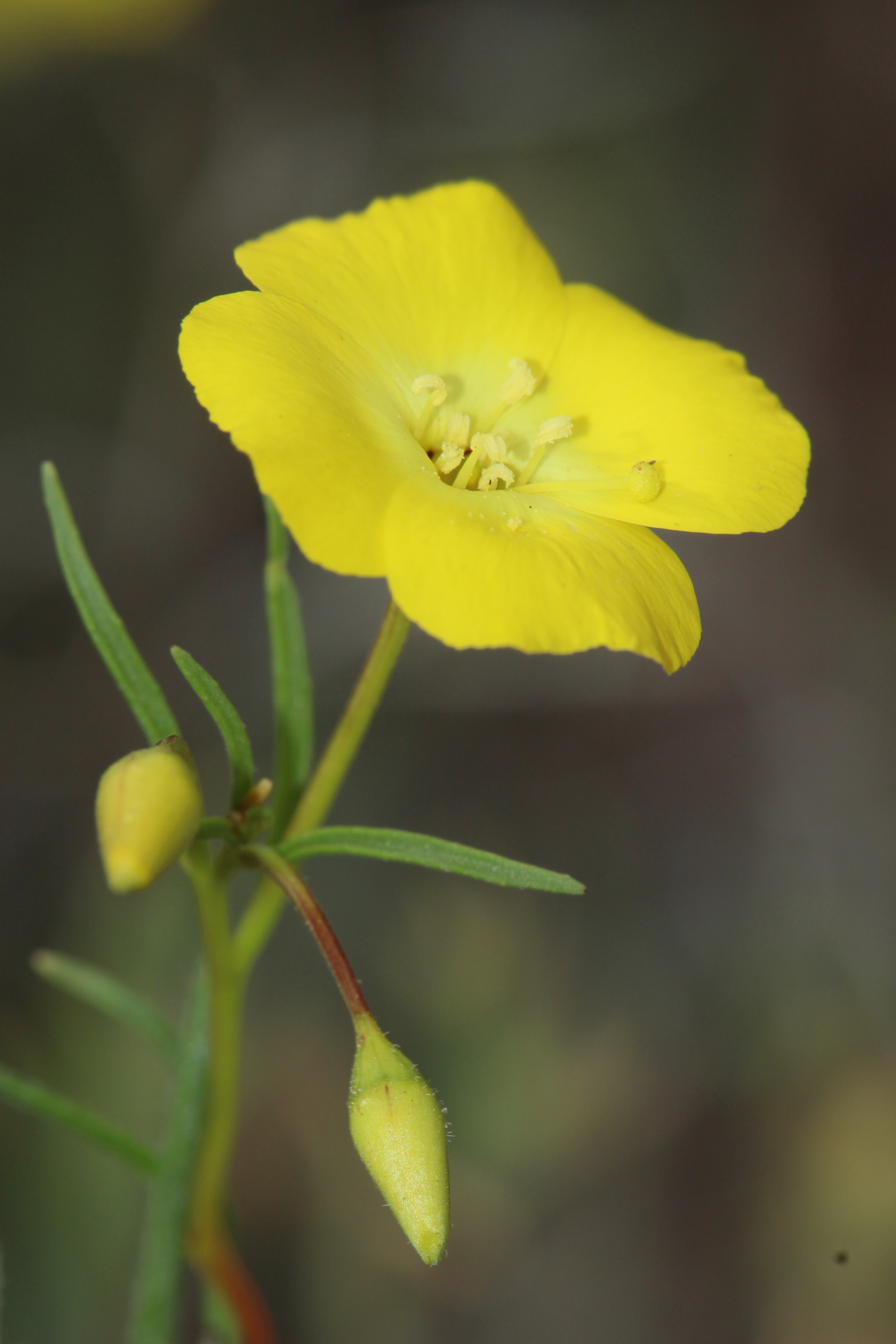

Conservation status
- Apparently Secure (NatureServe)

Scientific classification
- Kingdom: Plantae
- Clade: Tracheophytes
- Clade: Angiosperms
- Clade: Eudicots
- Clade: Rosids
- Order: Myrtales
- Family: Onagraceae
- Genus: Eulobus
- Species: E. californicus

Binomial name
- Eulobus californicus Nutt. ex Torr. & A.Gray

Synonyms
- Camissonia californica (Nutt. ex Torr. & A.Gray) P.H.Raven; Oenothera leptocarpa

= Eulobus californicus =

Species of flowering plant

Eulobus californicus, is a species of flowering plant in the evening primrose family known by the common name California suncup. It is native to California, Arizona, and adjacent northwestern Mexico, where it grows in scrub, chaparral, and desert plant communities.

== Description ==
Eulobus californicus is an annual herb which produces a basal rosette of leaves and then bolts a slender, erect stem which can exceed 1.5 metres (5 ft) in height. The larger leaves are located in the ground-level rosette; those on the stem are small and thready.

The upper stem is an inflorescence bearing widely spaced flowers on long pedicels. Each flower is a cup of four bright yellow petals, sometimes with red speckles near the bases. Behind the flowers are four smaller sepals, which are greenish and reflexed back against the pedicel. The fruit is a cylindrical capsule 4 to 10 centimetres (1.6 to 3.9 in) long.
