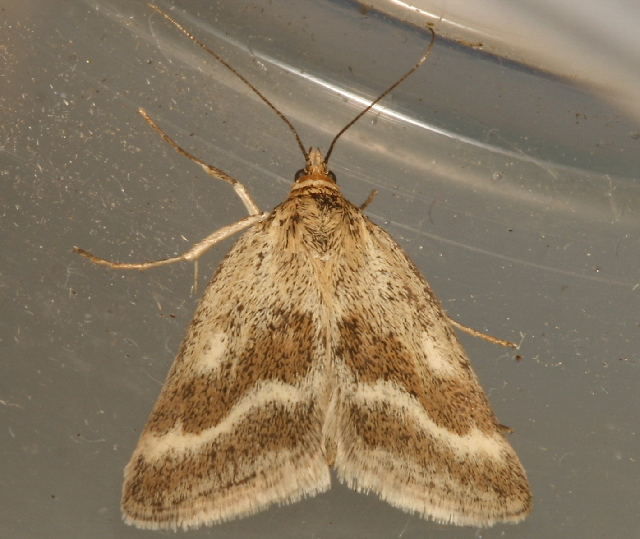

Scientific classification
- Kingdom: Animalia
- Phylum: Arthropoda
- Clade: Pancrustacea
- Class: Insecta
- Order: Lepidoptera
- Family: Crambidae
- Genus: Pyrausta
- Species: P. unifascialis

Binomial name
- Pyrausta unifascialis (Packard, 1873)

Synonyms
- Botys unifascialis Packard, 1873; Botis obnigralis Hulst, 1886; Botys unifascialis subolivalis Packard, 1873; Botis hircinalis Grote, 1875

= Pyrausta unifascialis =

Species of moth

Pyrausta unifascialis, the one-banded pyrausta, is a moth in the family Crambidae. It was described by Alpheus Spring Packard in 1873. It is found in North America, where it has been recorded from Quebec west to British Columbia, south to Arizona and California. The habitat consists of forest openings, clearings and fields.

The wingspan is 16–24 mm. Adults are on wing from April to August.

The larvae are polyphagous. They have been recorded feeding on Antennaria, Phaseolus, Eriogonum and Gayophytum species.

== Subspecies ==
- Pyrausta unifascialis unifascialis (British Columbia, Rocky Mountains, California)
- Pyrausta unifascialis arizonensis Munroe, 1957 (Arizona)
- Pyrausta unifascialis rindgei Munroe, 1857 (southern California)
- Pyrausta unifascialis subolivalis (Packard, 1873) (from Nova Scotia to Alberta, south to New Jersey, Pennsylvania, Illinois)
