= Hypericum sect. Thornea =

Scientific classification
- Kingdom: Plantae
- Clade: Tracheophytes
- Clade: Angiosperms
- Clade: Eudicots
- Clade: Rosids
- Order: Malpighiales
- Family: Hypericaceae
- Genus: Hypericum
- Section: Hypericum sect. Thornea (Breedlove & E.M.McClint.) N.Robson

Group of flowering plants

Hypericum sect. Thornea is a small section of flowering plants in the genus Hypericum. It was formerly treated as a separate genus, Thornea. There are two species in the section, Hypericum calcicola and Hypericum matudae.
