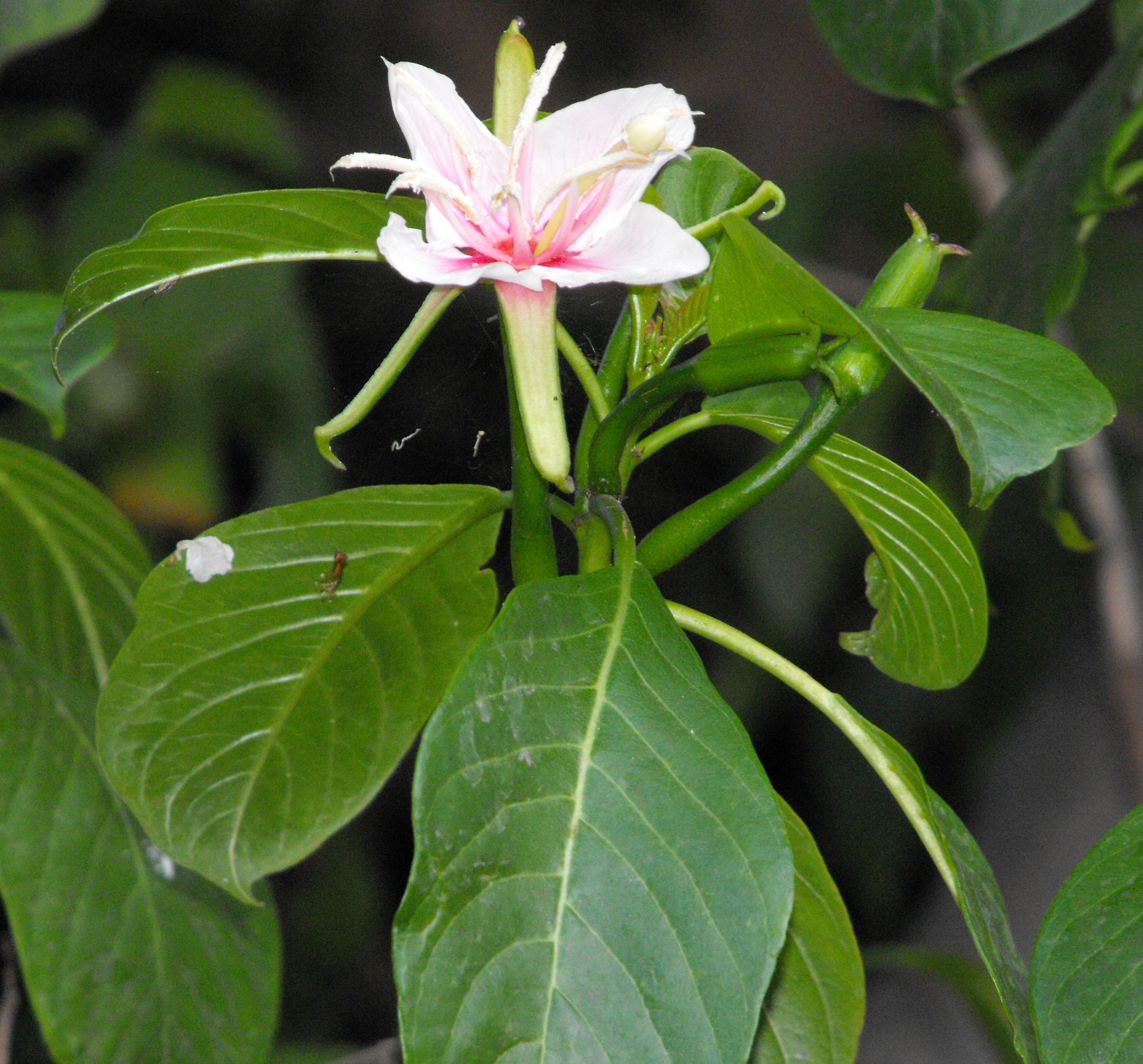

Conservation status
- Least Concern (IUCN 3.1)

Scientific classification
- Kingdom: Plantae
- Clade: Tracheophytes
- Clade: Angiosperms
- Clade: Eudicots
- Clade: Rosids
- Order: Myrtales
- Family: Onagraceae
- Genus: Hauya
- Species: H. elegans

Binomial name
- Hauya elegans Moc. & Sessé ex DC., 1828

= Hauya elegans =

Species of flowering plant

Hauya elegans is a species of flowering plant in the Onagraceae family. It is native to Oaxaca and Chiapas, Mexico to Honduras, Costa Rica, and Guatemala.
