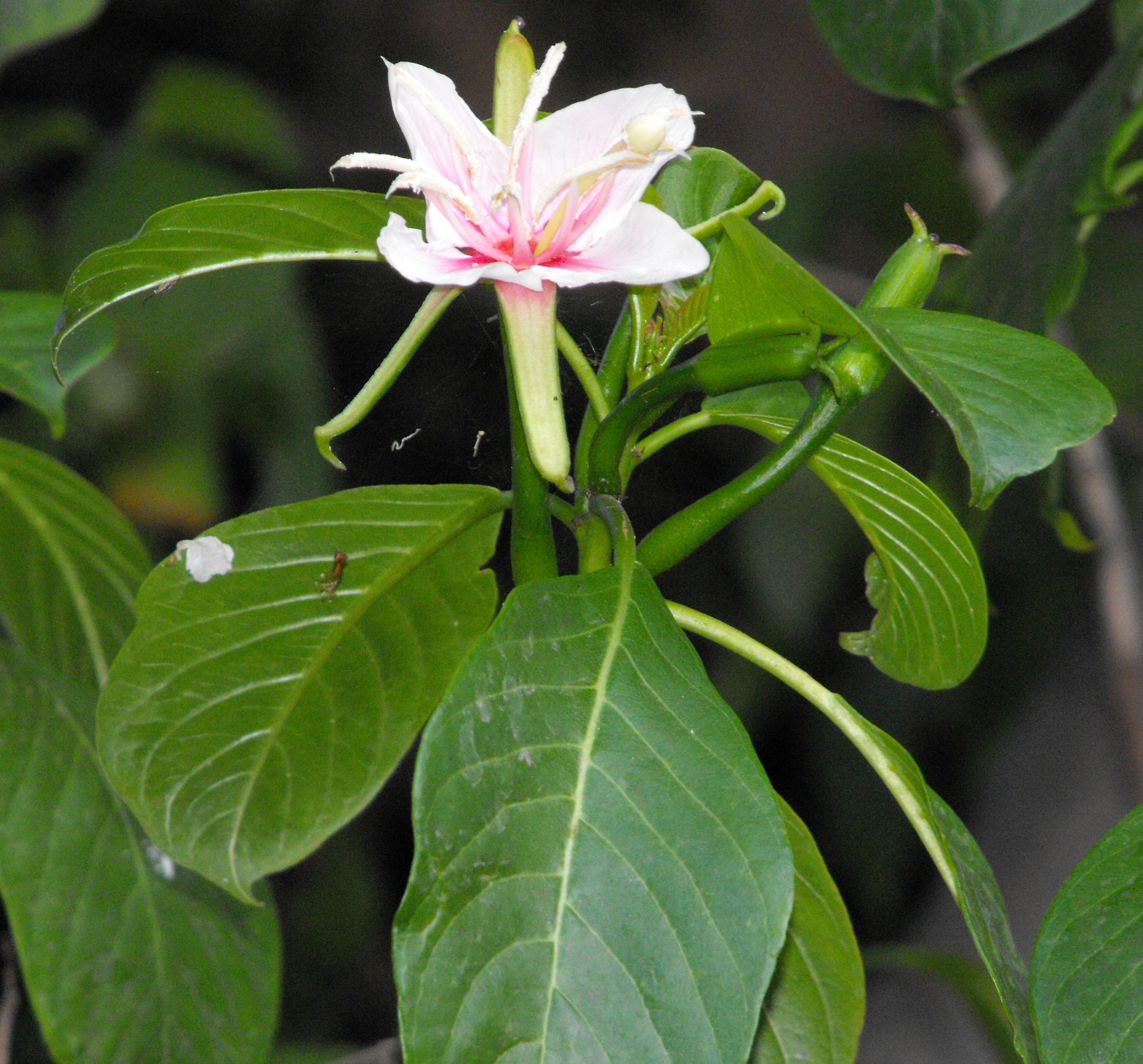
- Hauya elegans

Scientific classification
- Kingdom: Plantae
- Clade: Tracheophytes
- Clade: Angiosperms
- Clade: Eudicots
- Clade: Rosids
- Order: Myrtales
- Family: Onagraceae
- Subfamily: Onagroideae
- Tribe: Hauyeae
- Genus: Hauya; DC.

Type species
- Hauya elegans Moc. & Sessé ex DC.

= Hauya =

Genus of flowering plants

Hauya is a genus of plants of the family Onagraceae native to montane Central America. They are related to a lineage that gave rise to Fuchsia and Circaea.

== Species ==
| Image | Scientific name | Distribution |
|---|---|---|
| | Hauya elegans DC. | Oaxaca and Chiapas, Mexico to Honduras, Costa Rica, and Guatemala |
| | Hauya heydeana Donn. Sm. | Chiapas, Mexico and Guatemala |
