= Graciela Calderón (botanist) =

Botanist

- Other name: Graciela Calderón de Rzedowski
- Education: Instituto Politécnico Nacional, Escuela Nacional de Ciencias Biológicas, Mexico
- Scientific career
- Thesis: Vegetación del Valle de San Luis Potosí (1957)

Graciela Calderón Díaz Barriga (14 July 1931 – 2 January 2022) was a Mexican botanist and professor who was known for her work on neotropical flora.

== Education and career ==
She graduated in biology from the Instituto Politécnico Nacional in 1957, with the thesis "Vegetation of the San Luis Potosí Valley". She was recognized as a tenured researcher by the Sistema Nacional de Investigadores. She has worked at the Mexican Institute of Renewable Natural Resources, at the Institute of Ecology, A.C. (INECOL), at the Regional Center of the Bajío (in Pátzcuaro, Michoacán), in addition to the National School of Biological Sciences.

She was married to Jerzy Rzedowski, a botanical researcher and naturalized Mexican. Graciela and her husband were honored in 1994 with an edited book detailing their impact on the study of botany in Mexico.

== Selected publications ==
- Rzedowski, Jerzy; Calderón de Rzedowski, Graciela; Butanda, Armando. Los principales colectores de plantas activos en México entre 1700 y 1930 (in Spanish). Instituto de Ecología, A.C., Centro Regional del Bajío : Comisión Nacional para el Conocimiento y Uso de la Biodiversidad, Pátzcuaro, Michoacán.
- Calderón de Rzedowski, Graciela (2006). Flora del Bajío y de regiones adyacentes. 141: Familia Chloranthaceae / por Graciela Calderón de Rzedowski (in Spanish). Pátzcuaro, Michoacán: Inst. de Ecología A. C., Centro Regional del Bajío. ISBN 970-709-077-4.
- Calderón de Rzedowski, Graciela; Rzedowski, Jerzy (2001-10-01). "Nota aclaratoria acerca de los frutos de Priva aspera H. B. K. (Verbenaceae)". Acta Botanica Mexicana (57): 67–71. doi:10.21829/abm57.2001.885. ISSN 2448-7589.

== Honors and awards ==
Calderón received an honorary degree in 2010 from Universidad Autonoma Metropolitana.

The flowering plant Megacorax gracielanus is named in honor of Calderón's contribution to botany.
