= Epilobium pygmaeum =

Scientific classification
- Kingdom: Plantae
- Clade: Embryophytes
- Clade: Tracheophytes
- Clade: Spermatophytes
- Clade: Angiosperms
- Clade: Eudicots
- Clade: Rosids
- Order: Myrtales
- Family: Onagraceae
- Genus: Epilobium
- Species: E. pygmaeum

Binomial name
- Epilobium pygmaeum (Speg.) Hoch & P. H. Raven

Synonyms
- Boisduvalia glabella Boisduvalia pygmaea

Species of flowering plant

Epilobium pygmaeum is a species of willowherb known by the common names pygmy willowherb, smooth spike-primrose and smooth boisduvalia. This plant is native to western North America from Baja California to Saskatchewan. It is a resident of vernal pools and mudflats. This is an annual rarely reaching half a meter in height. It is densely foliated in thick green leaves which are hairless lower on the stems and velvety to hairy toward the tips of the branches. The inflorescences at the ends of the stems are dense with small, pointed leaves between which the flowers emerge. Many of the flowers are cleistogamous, meaning they self-pollinate without opening, while others open to reveal four bright pink darkly veined notched petals. The fruit is a small capsule a few millimeters long.
