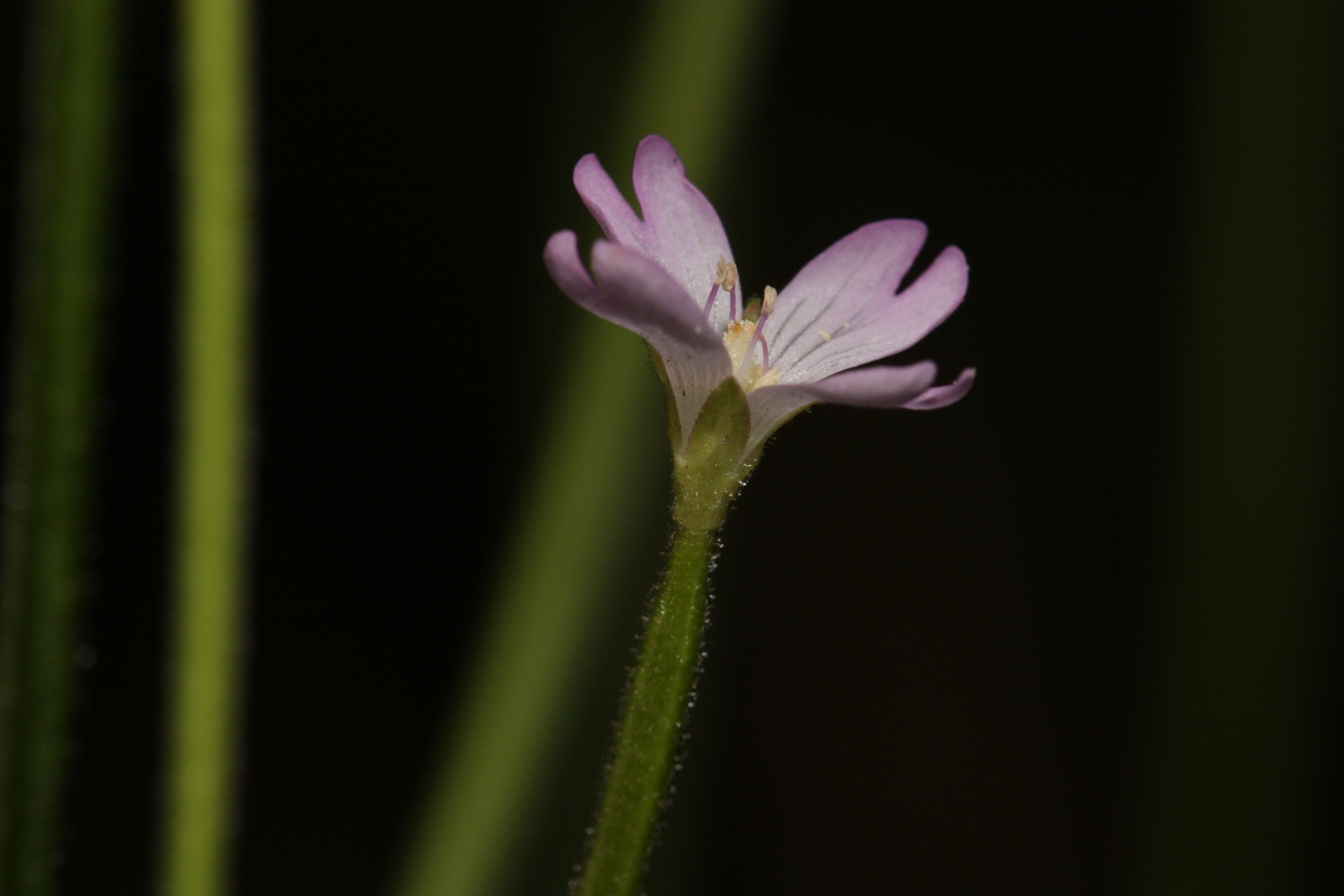
- Epilobium glaberrimum in Saddle Mountain State Natural Area, Washington

Scientific classification
- Kingdom: Plantae
- Clade: Embryophytes
- Clade: Tracheophytes
- Clade: Spermatophytes
- Clade: Angiosperms
- Clade: Eudicots
- Clade: Rosids
- Order: Myrtales
- Family: Onagraceae
- Genus: Epilobium
- Species: E. glaberrimum

Binomial name
- Epilobium glaberrimum Barbey

= Epilobium glaberrimum =

Species of flowering plant in the willowherb family

Epilobium glaberrimum is a species of willowherb known by the common name glaucous willowherb. This clumping perennial wildflower is native to western North America from central Canada to northern Mexico. It generally grows at some elevation in moist places. This plant is somewhat variable in appearance. It may exceed half a meter in height and has hairless foliage with leaves between 1 and 8 centimeters (0.4 and 3.1 in) long. The flower has four notched petals in purple, pink, or white which may be only a couple of millimeters long to over a centimeter long each. The fruit is a narrow, sticklike capsule 2 to 7 centimeters (0.8 to 2.8 in) long.

Two subspecies are recognized as valid:

- Epilobium glaberrimum ssp. fastigiatum (Nutt.) Hoch & P.H.Raven
- Epilobium glaberrimum ssp. glaberrimum
