= Megacorax =

Scientific classification
- Kingdom: Plantae
- Clade: Tracheophytes
- Clade: Angiosperms
- Clade: Eudicots
- Clade: Rosids
- Order: Myrtales
- Family: Onagraceae
- Subfamily: Onagroideae
- Tribe: Lopezieae
- Genus: Megacorax; S.González & W.L.Wagner
- Species: M. gracielanus

Binomial name
- Megacorax gracielanus S.González & W.L.Wagner

Species of flowering plant

Megacorax is a monotypic genus of flowering plants belonging to the family Onagraceae. The only species is Megacorax gracielanus S.González & W.L.Wagner.

It is native to Mexico. It was found in Sierra de Coneto, Durango.

The genus name of Megacorax is in honour of Peter H. Raven (born June 13, 1936) is an American botanist and environmentalist, notable as the longtime director, now President Emeritus, of the Missouri Botanical Garden. Megacorax refers to 'great' and 'Corvus' which is the latin name for Raven.

The Latin specific epithet of gracielanus honors the botanist Graciela Calderon Diaz Barriga. Both the genus and species were first described and published in Novon Vol.12 on page 361 in 2002.
