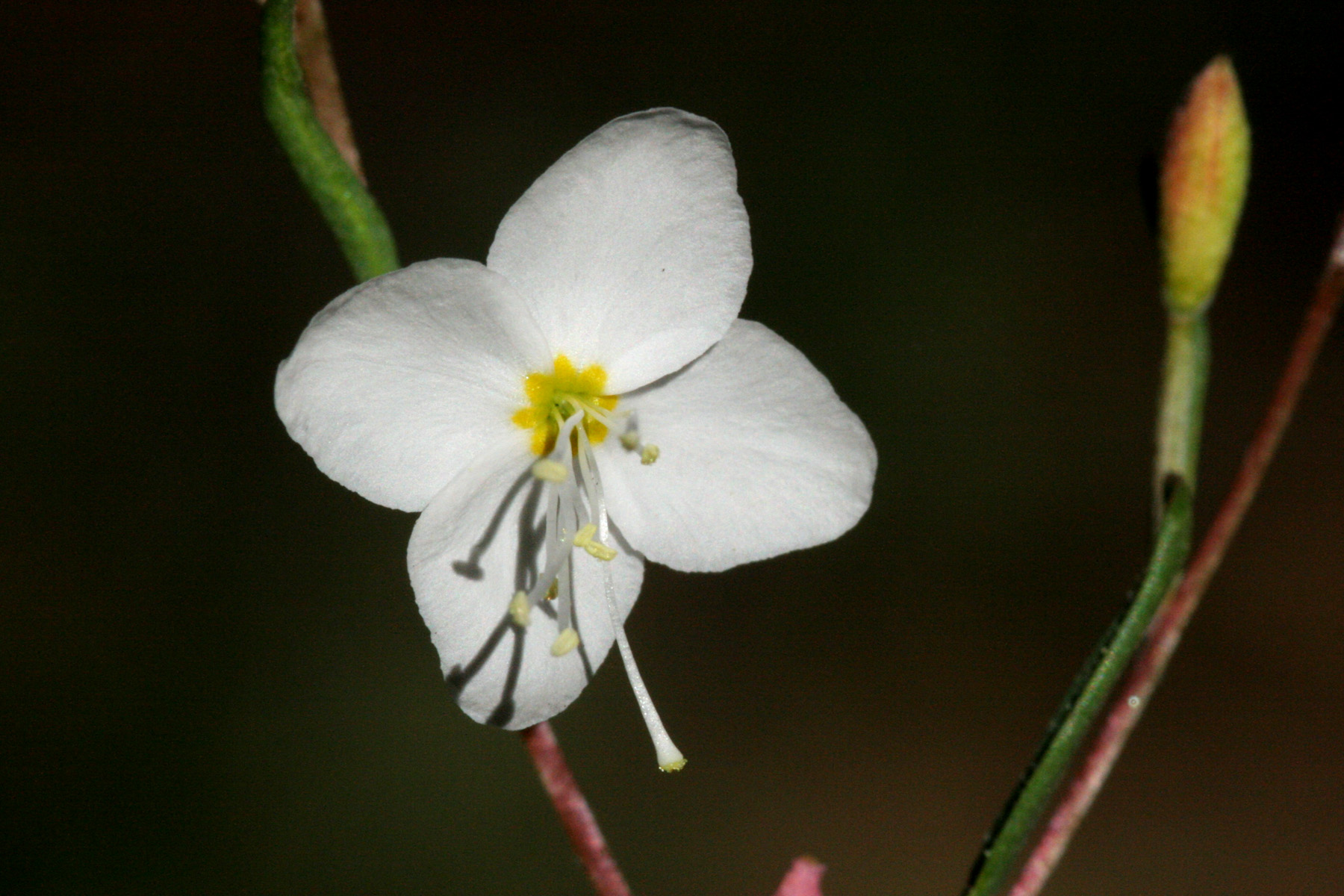

Scientific classification
- Kingdom: Plantae
- Clade: Tracheophytes
- Clade: Angiosperms
- Clade: Eudicots
- Clade: Rosids
- Order: Myrtales
- Family: Onagraceae
- Genus: Gayophytum
- Species: G. heterozygum

Binomial name
- Gayophytum heterozygum F.H.Lewis & Szweyk.

= Gayophytum heterozygum =

Species of flowering plant

Gayophytum heterozygum is a species of flowering plant in the evening primrose family known by the common name zigzag groundsmoke. It is native to the western United States where it grows mainly in forested mountain habitat. This is a spindly annual herb with a few forking branches which approaches 80 centimeters in maximum height. It has a sparse foliage of small, narrow leaves, most of which are on the lower half of the plant. It produces tiny white flowers toward the tops of the thin stems. The fruit is a lumpy-looking capsule.
