= Hypericum matudae =

Scientific classification
- Kingdom: Plantae
- Clade: Tracheophytes
- Clade: Angiosperms
- Clade: Eudicots
- Clade: Rosids
- Order: Malpighiales
- Family: Hypericaceae
- Genus: Hypericum
- Section: Hypericum sect. Thornea
- Species: H. matudae

Binomial name
- Hypericum matudae Lundell

Synonyms
- Thornea matudae (Lundell) Breedlove & E.M.McClint.

Species of flowering plant

Hypericum matudae is a species of flowering plant of the St. John's wort family Hypericaceae. It is a shrub that grows about 2 meters (6 ft 7 in) tall, has small and crowded branches, and has pink or white petals. Described in 1944 and named for botanist Eizi Matuda, the species was at one point named Thornea matudae because of its placement in the small genus Thornea. It was returned to Hypericum when Thornea was demoted to sectional status in 2016. Native to Nicaragua and Mexico, the species is found on shale and sandstone in the cloud forest ecosystem.

== Etymology ==
One origin of the genus name Hypericum is that it is derived from the Greek words hyper (above) and eikon (picture), in reference to the tradition of hanging the plant over religious icons in the home. The specific epithet matudae is in honor of the Mexican botanist Eizi Matuda.

== Description ==
Hypericum matudae is a shrub that lacks hairs (is glabrous) and grows about 2 meters (6 ft 7 in) tall. It has small, slender, short branches that are crowded together. The leaf stalks are grooved along their length and are around 0.35 centimeters long. The leaves are oval-shaped, have a papery texture, and are around 1–4.5 cm (0.4–1.8 in) long by 0.6–2.0 cm wide. The flower clusters (inflorescence) are in the shape of cymes up to 3.5 cm (1.4 in) long. The petioles are 0.2–0.7 cm long, while the pedicels are slender and 0.4–0.7 cm long. The bracts are lance-shaped and up to 0.25 cm long. The flowers have five sepals, each 0.25–0.3 cm long, with striations and a rounded tip. The petals are oblong and up to 0.7 cm long; they are pink or white in color. Each flower has nine stamens in fascicles of three, with filaments up to 0.4 cm long. There are three slender styles, and the ovary has three cells. The seed capsule is 0.4–0.7 cm long; the seeds themselves are around 0.1 cm long, are almost smooth, and have narrow wings along one side.

Hypericum matudae is distinguished from its sister species H. calcicola by having less dense branches, longer internodes, papery instead of leathery leaf texture, and larger petals and seed capsules.

== Taxonomy ==
The species was originally described by American botanist Cyrus Longworth Lundell in 1942 as Hypericum matudai. In 1976, Paul Standley and Julian Steyermark established a new genus named Thornea, to which they moved this species and H. calcicola. Thus, the new combination Thornea matudae was created and designated the type species of the genus. This placement was subsequently questioned, and phylogenetic studies suggested that Thornea was not an independent genus and its species should be returned to Hypericum. In 2016, in a review of these studies, Norman Robson restored Thornea matudae to Hypericum under the new Hypericum sect. Thornea. Following that classification, the placement of H. matudae can be summarized as follows:

Hypericum

Hypericum sect. Thornea

H. calcicola – H. matudae

== Distribution, habitat, and ecology ==
Hypericum matudae is native to Nicaragua and southeast Mexico, where it is found in the tropical montane cloud forest ecosytstem. It has been collected from an area with a highly diverse tree canopy and understory, on a substrate of shale and sandstone, at altitudes of 2000–4000 meters.
