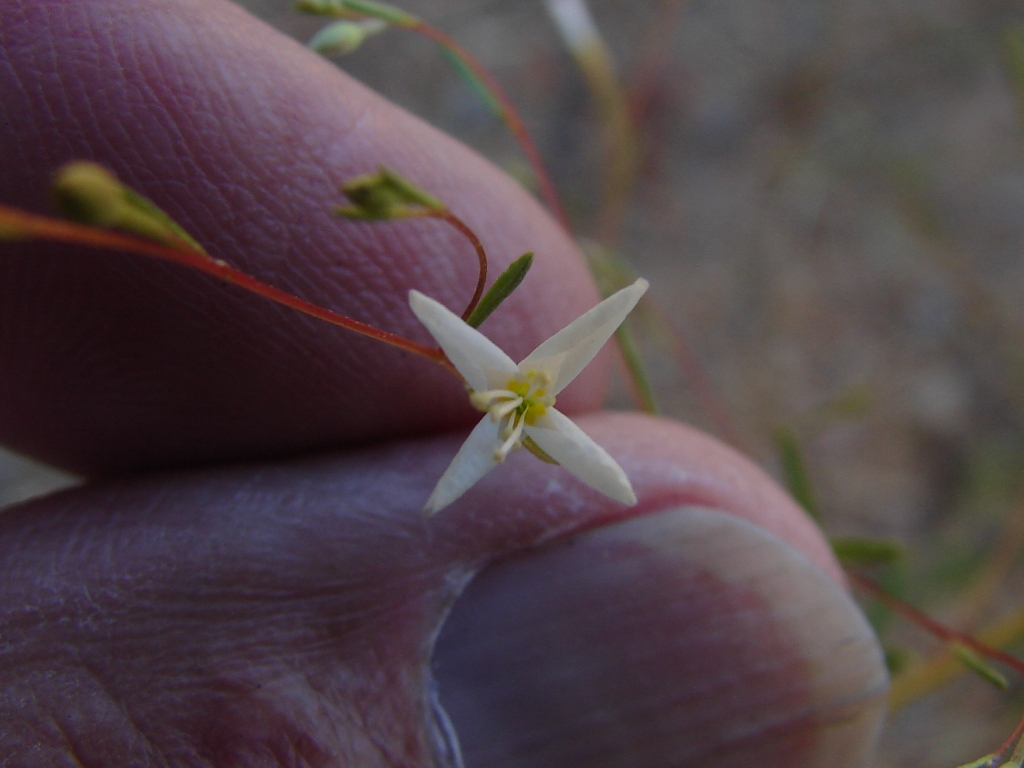

Conservation status
- Secure (NatureServe)

Scientific classification
- Kingdom: Plantae
- Clade: Embryophytes
- Clade: Tracheophytes
- Clade: Spermatophytes
- Clade: Angiosperms
- Clade: Eudicots
- Clade: Rosids
- Order: Myrtales
- Family: Onagraceae
- Genus: Gayophytum
- Species: G. diffusum

Binomial name
- Gayophytum diffusum Torr. & A.Gray

Subspecies
- G. d. subsp. diffusum; G. d. subsp. parviflorum

Synonyms
- List: Gayophytum diffusum var. typicum Munz; Gayophytum intermedium Rydb.; Gayophytum lasiospermum Greene; Oenothera albescens S.Watson; Oenothera diffusa Nutt.; Oenothera gayophytum f. diffusa (Torr. & A.Gray) H.Lév.; Oenothera purpurea Benth.

= Gayophytum diffusum =

Plant species in the evening primrose family

Gayophytum diffusum is a species of flowering plant in the evening primrose family known by the common name spreading groundsmoke. It is native to western North America where it is a common member of many different habitats. This is a spindly, branching annual herb reaching a maximum height of about half a meter. Its thin stems have sparse narrow leaves a few centimeters long. The occasional flowers are petite and usually white in color. The fruit is a cylindrical, knobby capsule up to 1.5 centimeters long.
