= Hemifuchsia =

Scientific classification
- Kingdom: Plantae
- Clade: Tracheophytes
- Clade: Angiosperms
- Clade: Eudicots
- Clade: Rosids
- Order: Myrtales
- Family: Onagraceae
- Genus: Hemifuchsia; Herrera (1936)
- Species: H. iodostoma

Binomial name
- Hemifuchsia iodostoma Herrera (1936)

Genus of flowering plant

Hemifuchsia iodostoma is a species of flowering plant in the family Onagraceae. It is the sole species in genus Hemifuchsia. It is endemic to Peru.
