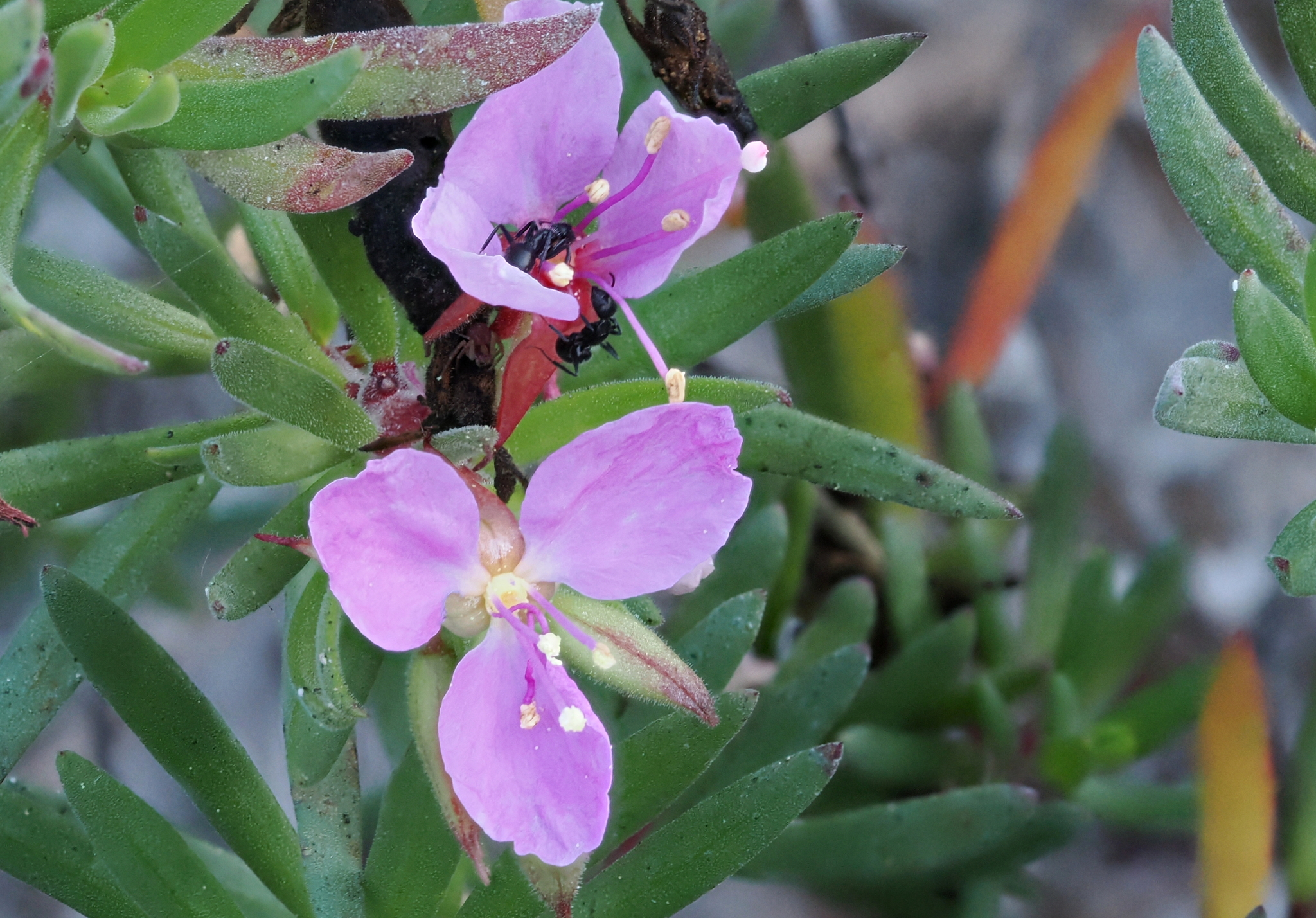
- Flowers of Gongylocarpus fruticulosus

Scientific classification
- Kingdom: Plantae
- Clade: Embryophytes
- Clade: Tracheophytes
- Clade: Angiosperms
- Clade: Eudicots
- Clade: Rosids
- Order: Myrtales
- Family: Onagraceae
- Genus: Gongylocarpus; Schltdl. & Cham.

= Gongylocarpus =

Genus of plants

Gongylocarpus is a genus of flowering plants belonging to the family Onagraceae.

Its native range is Mexico to Guatemala.

Species:

- Gongylocarpus fruticulosus (Benth.) Brandegee
  - subsp. glaber (J.H.Thomas) Carlquist & P.H.Raven
- Gongylocarpus rubricaulis Schltdl. & Cham.
