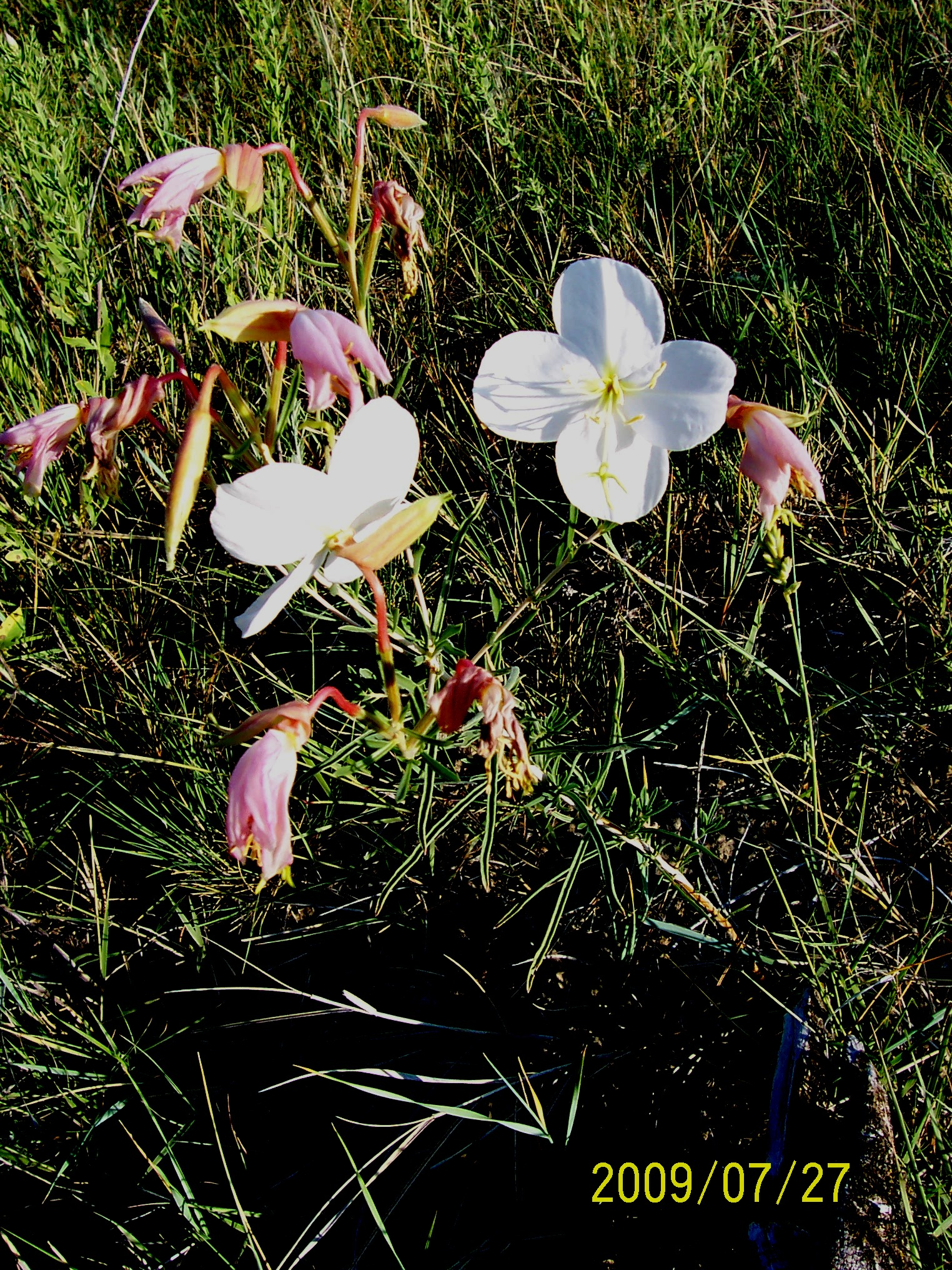
- Flowers

Conservation status
- Secure (NatureServe)

Scientific classification
- Kingdom: Plantae
- Clade: Tracheophytes
- Clade: Angiosperms
- Clade: Eudicots
- Clade: Rosids
- Order: Myrtales
- Family: Onagraceae
- Genus: Oenothera
- Species: O. nuttallii

Binomial name
- Oenothera nuttallii Torr. & A.Gray

Synonyms
- Anogra nuttalliana; Anogra nuttallii; Baumannia nuttalliana; Taraxia longiflora

= Oenothera nuttallii =

Plant species in the evening primrose family

Oenothera nuttallii, the white-stemmed evening-primrose, is a species of flowering plant in the evening primrose family. It is native to western Canada (except British Columbia), and the north-central United States, and it has been introduced to Illinois. A perennial reaching 60 cm (24 in), it is found in grasslands, sagebrush steppes, and plains, usually in sandy soils.

== Taxonomy ==
Oenothera nuttallii was scientifically described and named John Torrey and Asa Gray in 1840. It is part of the genus Oenothera in the Onagraceae family. It has 5 synonyms according to Plants of the World Online.

Table of Synonyms
Name	Year	Rank	Notes
Anogra nuttalliana Spach	1835	species	≡ hom., nom. superfl.
Anogra nuttallii (Torr. & A.Gray) A.Nelson	1902	species	≡ hom.
Baumannia nuttalliana Spach	1835	species	≡ hom., nom. superfl.
Oenothera albicaulis var. nuttallii Engelm.	1862	variety	= het.
Taraxia longiflora Raim.	1893	species	≡ hom., nom. superfl.
Notes: ≡ homotypic synonym; = heterotypic synonym
