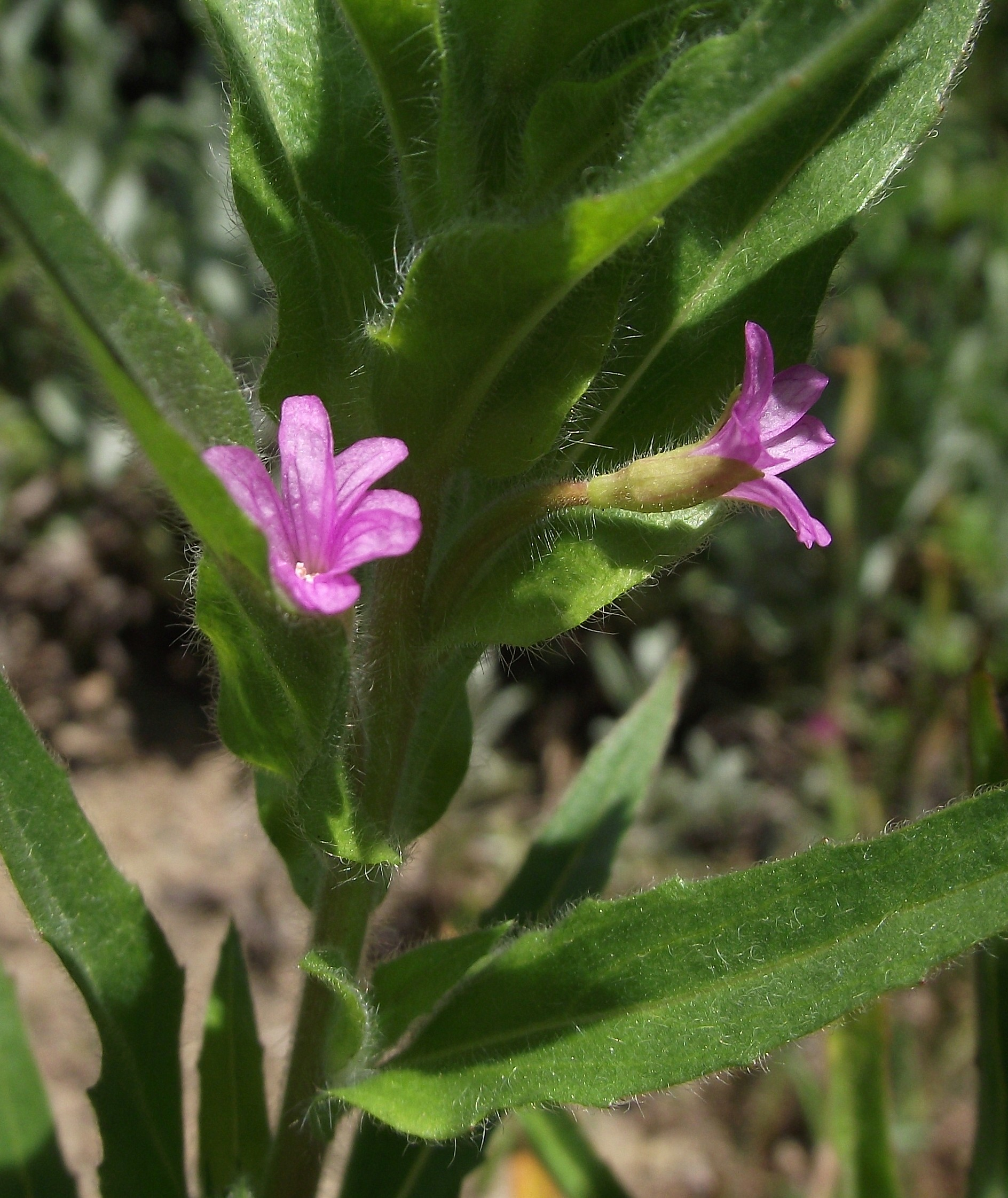

Scientific classification
- Kingdom: Plantae
- Clade: Tracheophytes
- Clade: Angiosperms
- Clade: Eudicots
- Clade: Rosids
- Order: Myrtales
- Family: Onagraceae
- Genus: Epilobium
- Species: E. densiflorum

Binomial name
- Epilobium densiflorum (Lindl.) Hoch & P. H. Raven

Synonyms
- Boisduvalia densiflora Boisduvalia salicina Oenothera densiflora

= Epilobium densiflorum =

Species of flowering plant

Epilobium densiflorum is a species of willowherb known by the common names denseflower willowherb, dense spike-primrose or dense boisduvalia. It is native to western North America from British Columbia to Baja California, where it is found in a variety of habitats. This is an erect annual often exceeding a meter in height with fuzzy green foliage. The pointed leaves are up to 8 centimeters long near the base of the plant, and the upper leaves are generally more hairy than the lower. The stem may branch or not. The top of the stem is occupied by a hairy, leafy, densely flowered inflorescence. Each flower has four deeply notched petals in shades of pinkish purple to nearly white with dark veining, each about a centimeter long. The fruit is a cylindrical capsule about a centimeter long.
