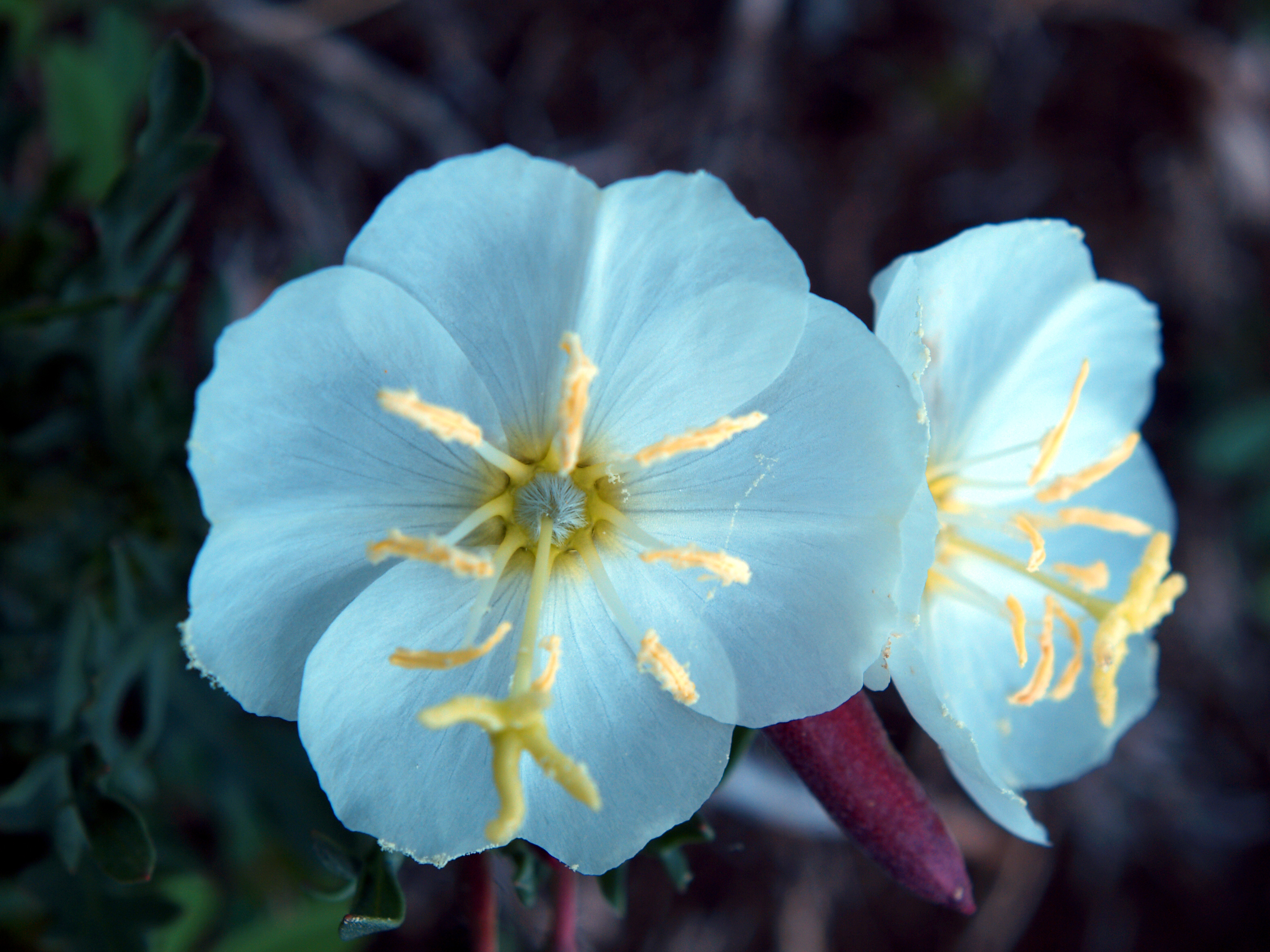

Conservation status
- Secure (NatureServe)

Scientific classification
- Kingdom: Plantae
- Clade: Tracheophytes
- Clade: Angiosperms
- Clade: Eudicots
- Clade: Rosids
- Order: Myrtales
- Family: Onagraceae
- Genus: Oenothera
- Species: O. albicaulis

Binomial name
- Oenothera albicaulis Pursh

Synonyms
- Anogra albicaulis (Pursh) Britton; Oenothera purshii G.Don

= Oenothera albicaulis =

Plant species in the evening primrose family

Oenothera albicaulis is a New World plant in the evening primrose family. It is known by the common names prairie evening-primrose, white-stem evening-primrose, whitish evening primrose, or whitest evening primrose.

== Taxonomy ==
Oenothera albicaulis was scientifically described and named by Frederick Traugott Pursh in 1813. It is classified in the genus Oenothera, part of the family Onagraceae. It has no accepted subspecies or varieties, but has 30 synonyms according to Plants of the World Online.

Table of Synonyms
Name	Year	Rank	Notes
Anogra albicaulis (Pursh) Britton	1894	species	≡ hom.
Anogra bradburiana Rydb.	1917	species	= het.
Anogra confusa Rickett	1934	species	= het.
Anogra ctenophylla Wooton & Standl.	1913	species	= het.
Anogra douglasiana Spach	1835	species	= het.
Anogra leptophylla (Nutt.) Rydb.	1913	species	= het.
Anogra pinnatifida Spach	1835	species	= het.
Baumannia pinnatifida (Nutt.) Spach	1835	species	= het.
Oenothera albicaulis Nutt.	1818	species	= het., nom. illeg.
Oenothera albicaulis f. acaulis H.Lév.	1909	form	= het.
Oenothera albicaulis f. anthoxantha H.Lév.	1909	form	= het.
Oenothera albicaulis subvar. coquimbensis H.Lév.	1909	subvariety	= het.
Oenothera albicaulis f. decumbens H.Lév.	1909	form	= het., nom. illeg.
Oenothera albicaulis f. dentata H.Lév.	1909	form	= het.
Oenothera albicaulis f. erosa H.Lév.	1909	form	= het.
Oenothera albicaulis f. mucronata H.Lév.	1909	form	= het.
Oenothera albicaulis f. pinnatifida H.Lév.	1909	form	= het.
Oenothera albicaulis f. sinuata H.Lév.	1909	form	= het.
Oenothera albicaulis var. tigrina H.Lév.	1909	variety	= het.
Oenothera albicaulis var. xanthosperma H.Lév.	1909	variety	= het.
Oenothera bradburiana Nutt.	1840	species	= het.
Oenothera ctenophylla (Wooton & Standl.) Tidestr.	1941	species	= het.
Oenothera leptophylla Nutt.	1840	species	= het.
Oenothera nuttallii Sweet	1830	species	= het., not validly publ.
Oenothera pallida var. leptophylla Torr. & A.Gray	1840	variety	= het.
Oenothera pinnatifida Nutt.	1818	species	= het.
Oenothera pinnatifida Torr.	1827	species	= het., nom. illeg.
Oenothera pinnatifida var. integrifolia A.Gray	1849	variety	= het.
Oenothera purshii G.Don	1832	species	≡ hom., nom. superfl.
Oenothera sinuata var. bicolor H.Lév.	1909	variety	= het.
Notes: ≡ homotypic synonym; = heterotypic synonym

== Distribution ==
Oenothera albicaulis is native to North America, in the United States (Arizona; Colorado; Montana; New Mexico; Oklahoma; South Dakota; Texas; and Utah), and in Mexico (in Chihuahua state).

== Uses ==
The Zuni people rub the chewed blossoms on the bodies of young girls so that they can dance well and ensure rain.
