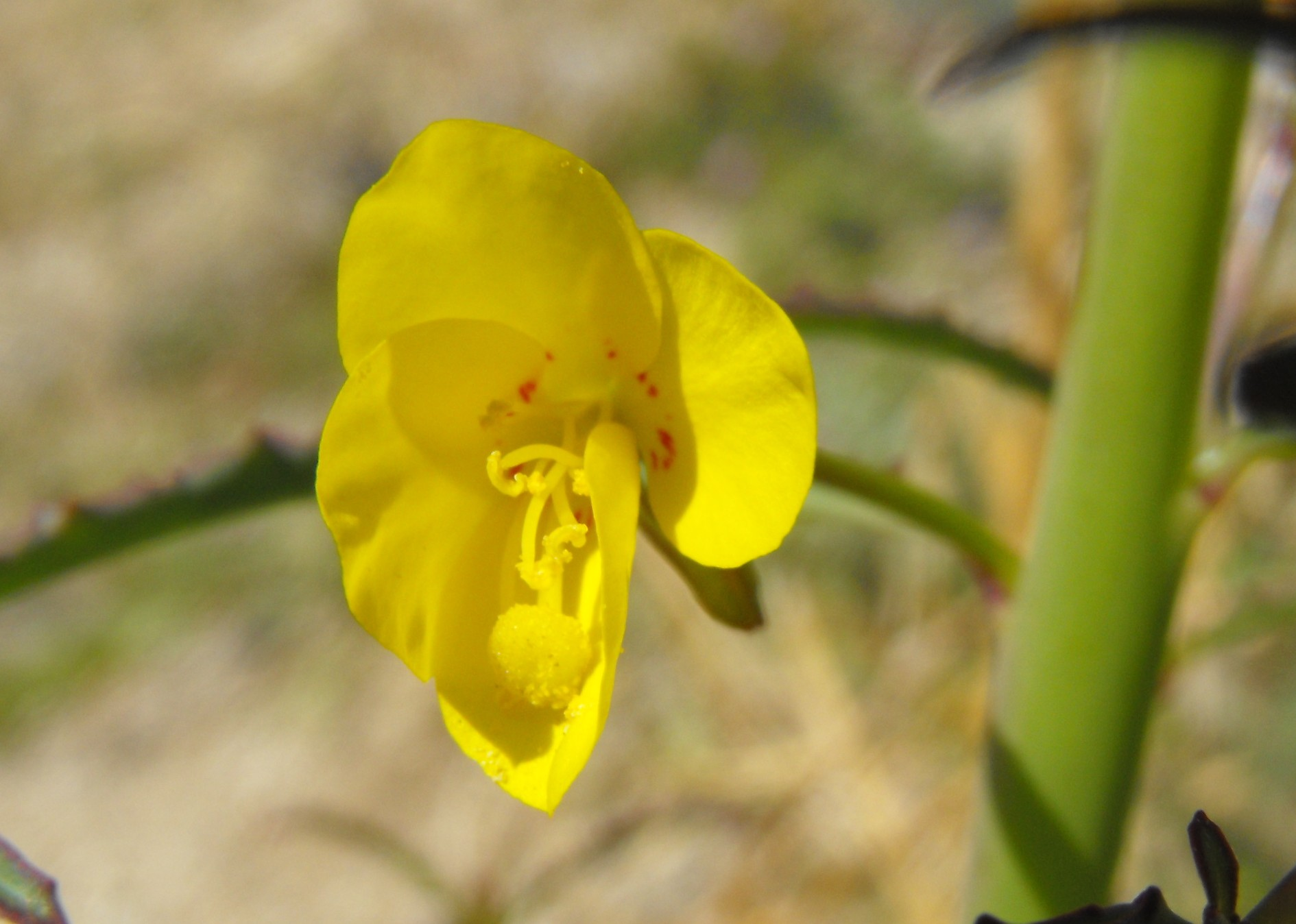
- E. californicus

Scientific classification
- Kingdom: Plantae
- Clade: Tracheophytes
- Clade: Angiosperms
- Clade: Eudicots
- Clade: Rosids
- Order: Myrtales
- Family: Onagraceae
- Subfamily: Onagroideae
- Tribe: Onagreae
- Genus: Eulobus; Nutt.

= Eulobus =

Genus of flowering plants

Eulobus is a genus of flowering plants belonging to the family Onagraceae.

Its native range is Southwestern USA to Northwestern Mexico.

Species:

- Eulobus angelorum (S.Watson) W.L.Wagner & Hoch
- Eulobus californicus Nutt.
- Eulobus crassifolius (Greene) W.L.Wagner & Hoch
- Eulobus sceptrostigma (Brandegee) W.L.Wagner & Hoch
