= Chylismiella =

Scientific classification
- Kingdom: Plantae
- Clade: Tracheophytes
- Clade: Angiosperms
- Clade: Eudicots
- Clade: Rosids
- Order: Myrtales
- Family: Onagraceae
- Subfamily: Onagroideae
- Tribe: Onagreae
- Genus: Chylismiella; W.L.Wagner & Hoch
- Species: C. pterosperma

Binomial name
- Chylismiella pterosperma (S.Watson) W.L. Wagner & Hoch

Synonyms
- Camissonia pterosperma (S.Watson) P.H.Raven; Chylismia pterosperma (S.Watson) Small; Oenothera pterosperma S.Watson; Sphaerostigma pterospermum (S.Watson) A.Nelson

Genus of flowering plants

Chylismiella pterosperma is a species of evening primrose known by the common name wingfruit suncup and is the only species in the monotypic genus Chylismiella. It is native to the western United States, where it grows in several habitat types, including sagebrush. It is a slender annual herb producing an erect stem up to about 14 centimeters in height. The leaves are up to 3 centimeters long and densely coated in bristly hairs. The nodding inflorescence produces flowers with white petals each less than 3 millimeters long. They are sometimes yellow near the bases and fade to a purple color as they wither. The fruit is a straight capsule about 1 to 3 centimeters long with a thick wing down the middle.
