= Epilobium halleanum =

Scientific classification
- Kingdom: Plantae
- Clade: Embryophytes
- Clade: Tracheophytes
- Clade: Spermatophytes
- Clade: Angiosperms
- Clade: Eudicots
- Clade: Rosids
- Order: Myrtales
- Family: Onagraceae
- Genus: Epilobium
- Species: E. halleanum

Binomial name
- Epilobium halleanum Hausskn.

Species of flowering plant

Epilobium halleanum is a species of flowering plant in the evening primrose family known by the common name glandular willowherb. It is native to parts of western North America from British Columbia to New Mexico, where it grows in many types of habitat. It is an erect perennial herb growing up to about half a meter tall. The leaves are oval in shape low on the stem and narrower and somewhat lance-shaped higher, the longest about 4.5 centimeters (1.8 in) long. The inflorescence is a raceme of glandular flowers, each with four notched white to pink petals a few millimeters long. The fruit is an elongated capsule up to 6 centimeters (2.4 in) long.
