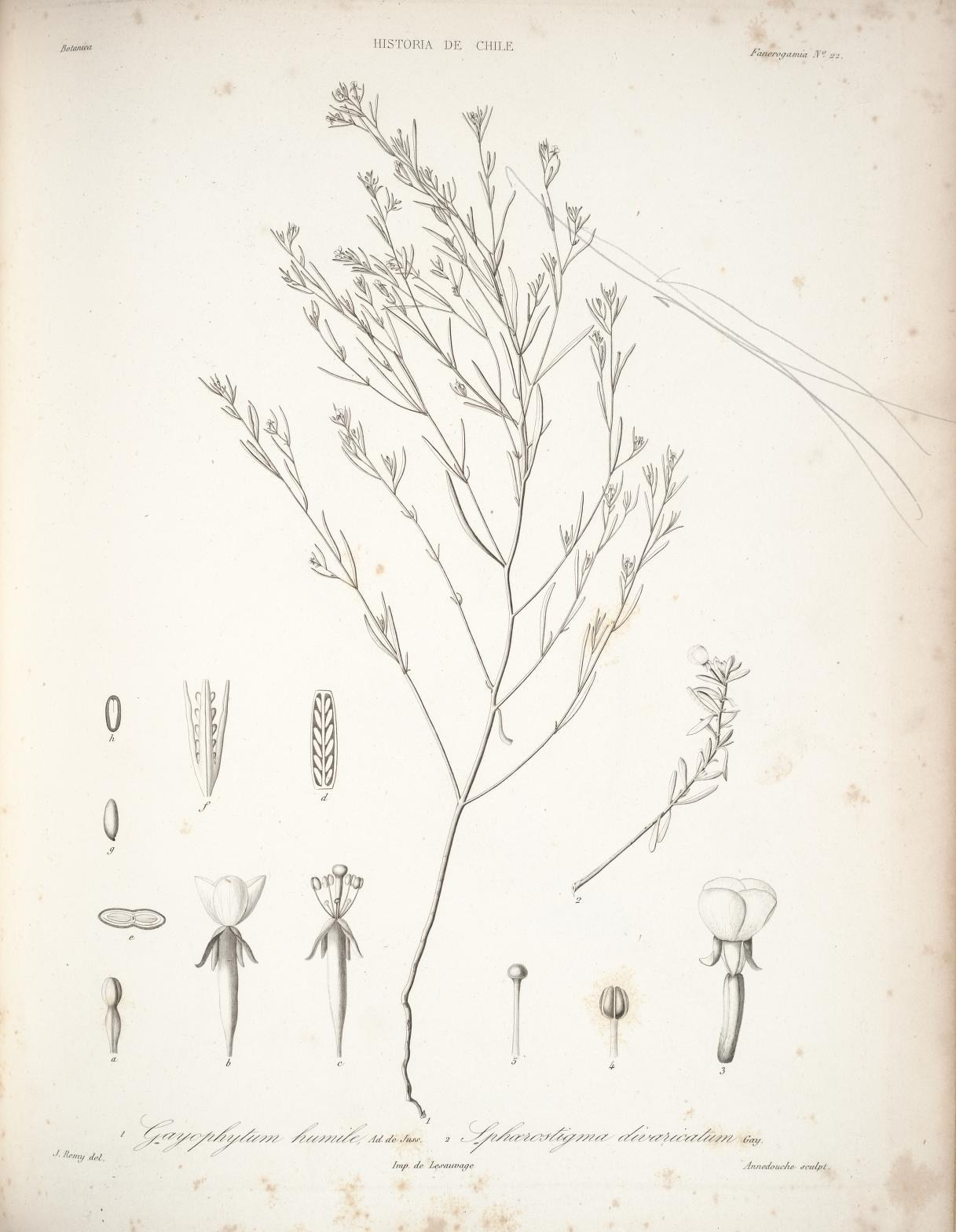

Scientific classification
- Kingdom: Plantae
- Clade: Tracheophytes
- Clade: Angiosperms
- Clade: Eudicots
- Clade: Rosids
- Order: Myrtales
- Family: Onagraceae
- Genus: Gayophytum
- Species: G. humile

Binomial name
- Gayophytum humile Juss.

Synonyms
- Gayophytum nuttalli

= Gayophytum humile =

Species of flowering plant

Gayophytum humile is a species of flowering plant in the evening primrose family known by the common name dwarf groundsmoke. It is native to western North America from Alberta to California, and can also be found in parts of South America. It lives in many types of mountain habitats, especially moist areas. It is a small, thin annual herb not exceeding 30 centimeters in height. Its erect stem has few branches and sparse narrow leaves. The stem and leaves are green to bright red, or green with reddish edges and tips. The plant produces tiny white flowers each about half a centimeter across. The fruit is a capsule one to one and a half centimeters long containing up to 50 seeds.
