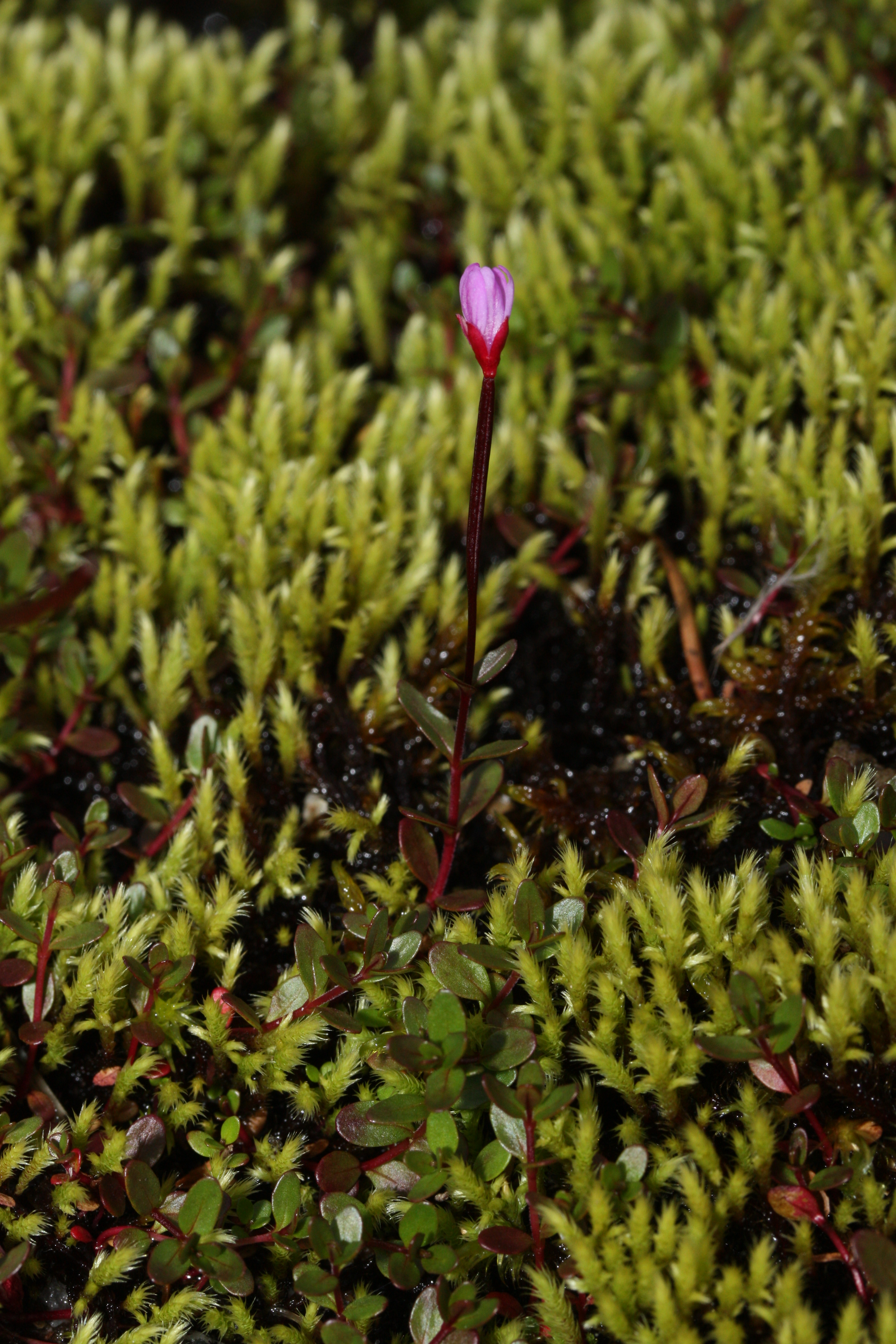
- In Alpine Lakes Wilderness, WA, USA

Conservation status
- Secure (NatureServe)

Scientific classification
- Kingdom: Plantae
- Clade: Tracheophytes
- Clade: Angiosperms
- Clade: Eudicots
- Clade: Rosids
- Order: Myrtales
- Family: Onagraceae
- Genus: Epilobium
- Species: E. anagallidifolium

Binomial name
- Epilobium anagallidifolium Lam.

Synonyms
- List: Epilobium alpinum subsp. anagallidifolium (Lam.) Čelak.; Epilobium alpinum var. fontanum Wahlenb.; Epilobium athelespermum H.Lév.; Epilobium cernuum Pall. ex Hausskn.; Epilobium dielsii H.Lév.; Epilobium nakaharanum Nakai; Epilobium pseudoscaposum Hausskn.; Epilobium repens Hill

= Epilobium anagallidifolium =

Species of flowering plant in the willowherb family

Epilobium anagallidifolium is a species of willowherb known by the common names pimpernel willowherb and alpine willowherb. This small flowering plant has a near-circumboreal distribution and can be found in mountain ranges further south, where grows in alpine climates. It is a perennial found in low clumps rarely exceeding 20 centimeters in height.

== Description ==
This species has an unbranched stem rising to 150 cm high. The leaves are lanceolate, alternate and have a short stalk. It has wide, rounded basal leaves and narrower leaves further up the stem, and its foliage is often hairy. It bears purple or pinkish trumpet-shaped flowers and the fruit is a capsule two or three centimeters long.
