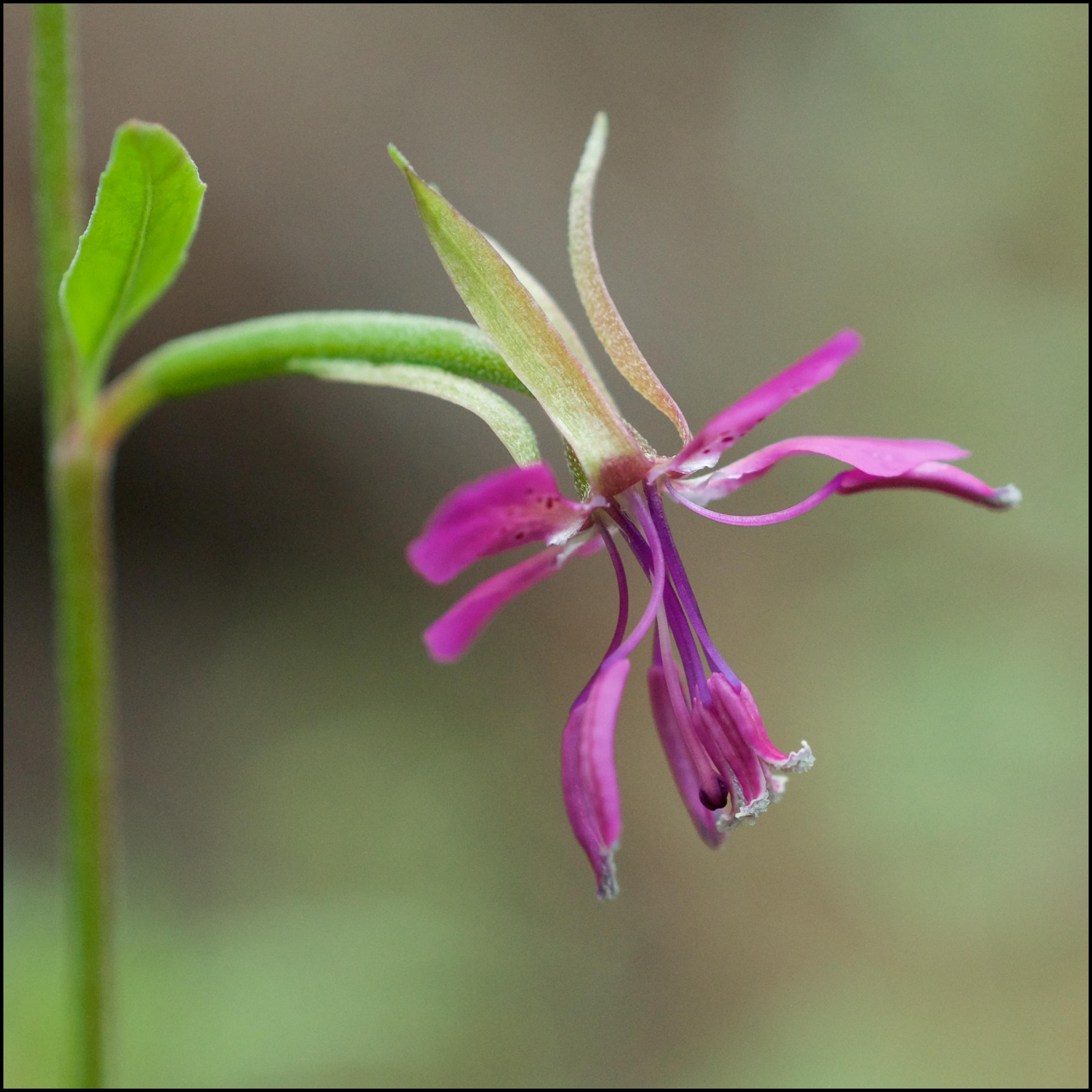

Scientific classification
- Kingdom: Plantae
- Clade: Tracheophytes
- Clade: Angiosperms
- Clade: Eudicots
- Clade: Rosids
- Order: Myrtales
- Family: Onagraceae
- Genus: Clarkia
- Species: C. rhomboidea

Binomial name
- Clarkia rhomboidea Dougl. ex Hook.

= Clarkia rhomboidea =

Species of flowering plant

Clarkia rhomboidea is a species of wildflower known by the common names diamond clarkia and forest clarkia. This plant is native to western North America, where it is a common resident of varied forest and woodland habitats. This clarkia grows a spindly stem not exceeding a meter in height and occasional small leaves. The flower has four petals which are bright pink to lavender and often speckled with darker pink shades. The petals are diamond-shaped to spoon-shaped and one to one and a half centimeters long. There are eight stamens, each holding a large anther bearing blue-gray pollen.
