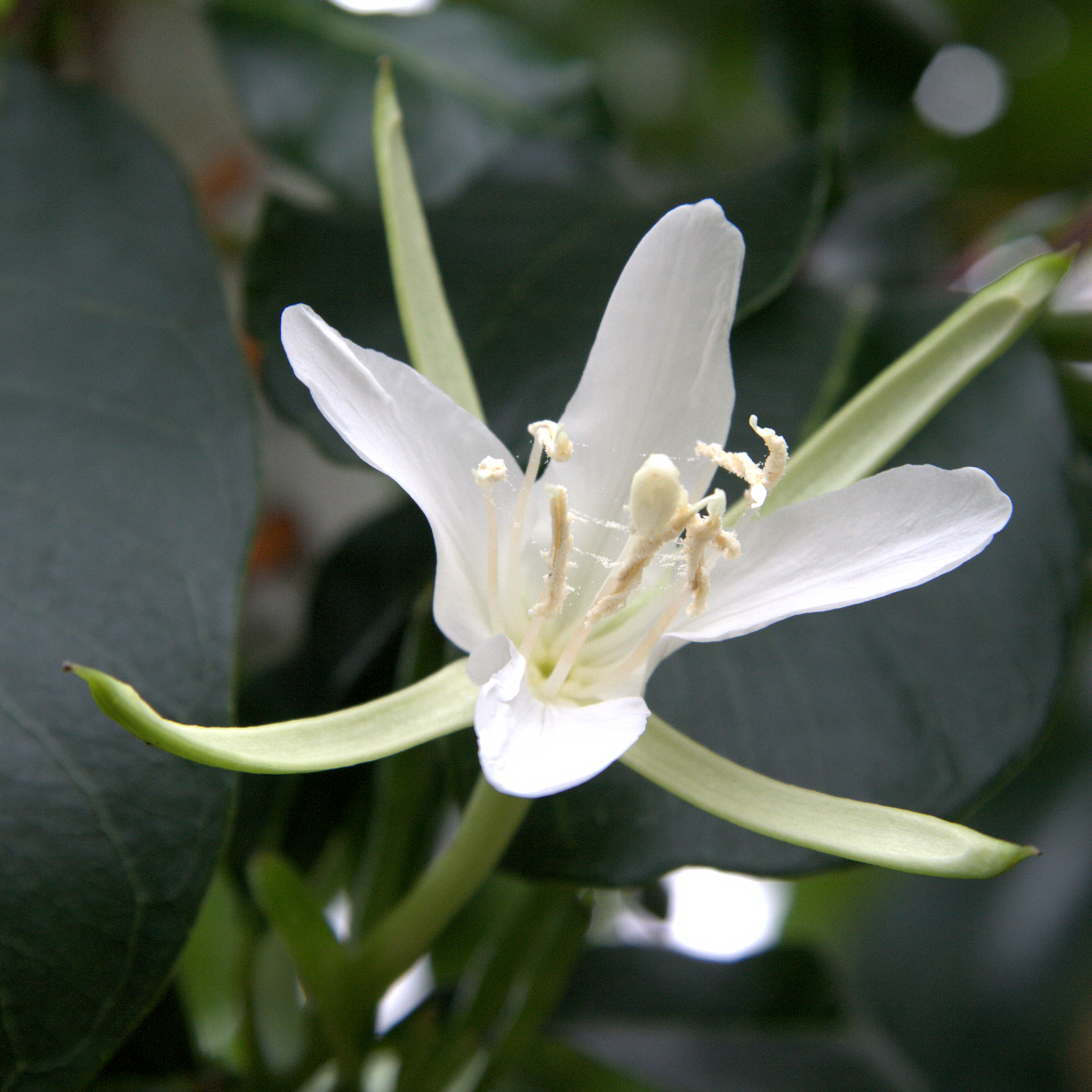

Scientific classification
- Kingdom: Plantae
- Clade: Tracheophytes
- Clade: Angiosperms
- Clade: Eudicots
- Clade: Rosids
- Order: Myrtales
- Family: Onagraceae
- Tribe: Hauyeae
- Genus: Hauya
- Species: H. heydeana

Binomial name
- Hauya heydeana Donn. Sm. 1893

= Hauya heydeana =

Species of flowering plant

Hauya heydeana is a species of Hauya that is native to Chiapas, Mexico and Guatemala.
