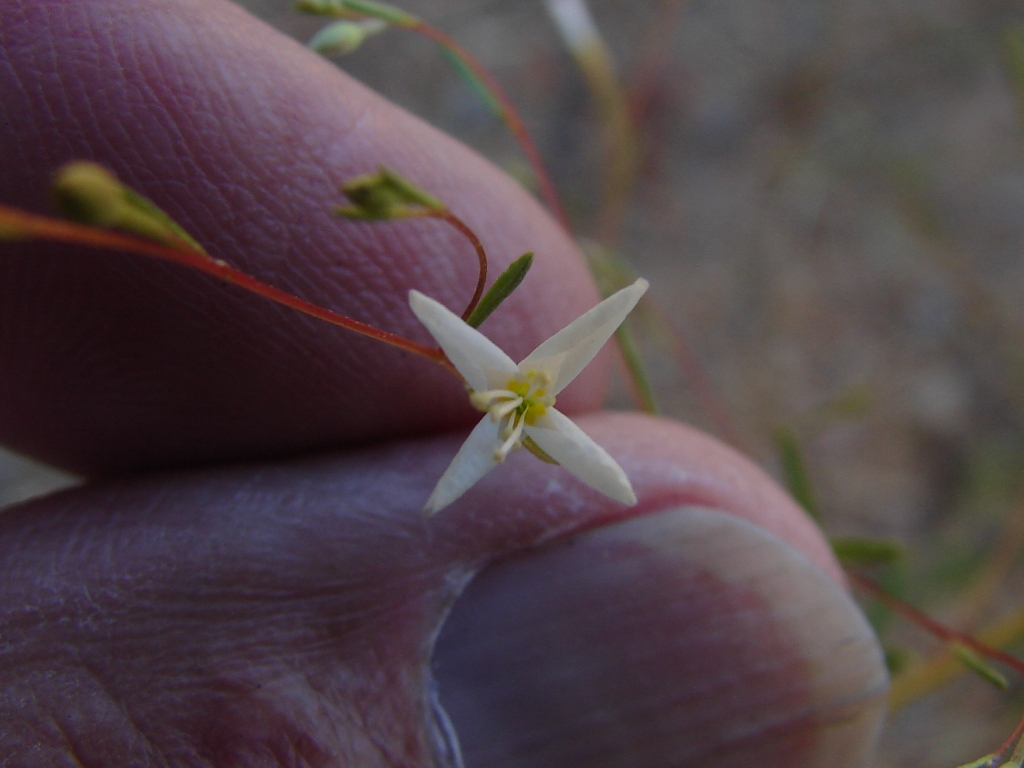
- Gayophytum diffusum

Scientific classification
- Kingdom: Plantae
- Clade: Tracheophytes
- Clade: Angiosperms
- Clade: Eudicots
- Clade: Rosids
- Order: Myrtales
- Family: Onagraceae
- Subfamily: Onagroideae
- Tribe: Onagreae
- Genus: Gayophytum; A.Juss.

Species
- ~9, See text

= Gayophytum =

Genus of flowering plants in the willowherb family Onagraceae

Gayophytum is a genus of annual herbs in the evening primrose family known commonly as groundsmoke. There are about nine species of groundsmoke, most of which are native to western North America. These are erect flowering herbs generally well under a metre in height and with narrow leaves. They produce white flowers which fade to pink or red.

Species include:

- Gayophytum decipiens - deceptive groundsmoke
- Gayophytum diffusum - spreading groundsmoke
- Gayophytum eriospermum - Coville's groundsmoke
- Gayophytum heterozygum - zigzag groundsmoke
- Gayophytum humile - dwarf groundsmoke
- Gayophytum oligospermum - pinegrove groundsmoke
- Gayophytum racemosum - blackfoot groundsmoke
- Gayophytum ramosissimum - pinyon groundsmoke

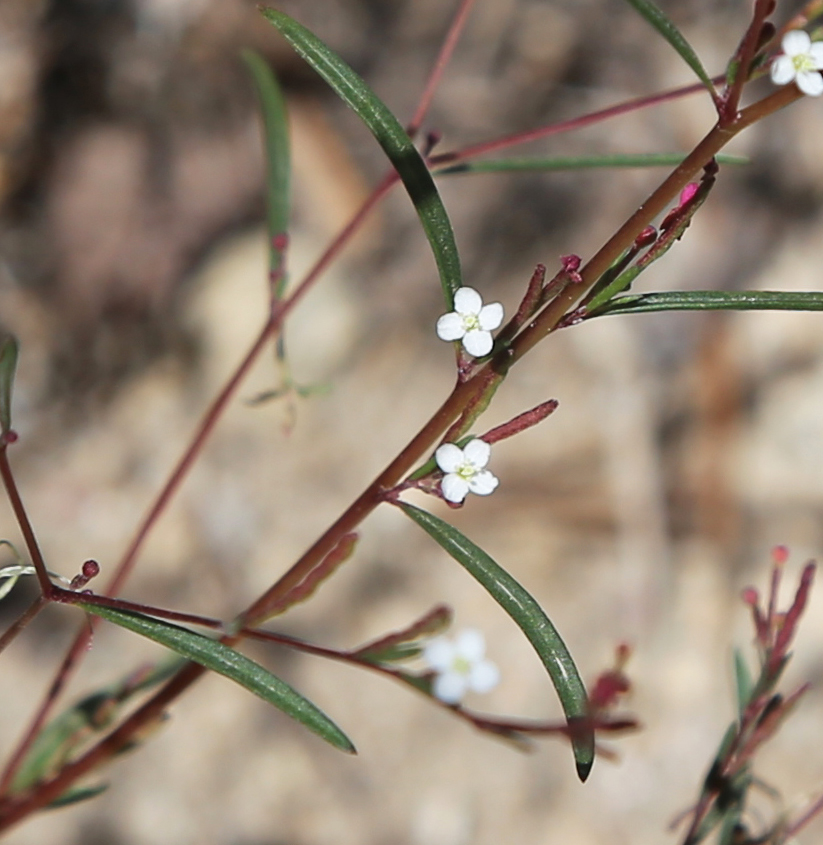
G. racemosum flowers close
