= Elizabeth McClintock =

California botanist (1912–2004)

Elizabeth May McClintock (7 July 1912 – 19 October 2004) was a botanist who was born in San Jacinto, California, United States, and grew up near the San Jacinto Mountains. She earned a Bachelor's degree in 1937 and a Master's degree in 1939 from the University of California, Los Angeles and a Ph.D. in botany in 1956 from the University of Michigan. She specialized in taxonomy and distribution of flowering plants, and focused on California natives. She documented invasive plants in California, and compiled information on toxicity of poisonous plants cultivated in the state.

== Works ==
McClintock was a herbarium botanist at UCLA from 1941 through 1947. From 1949 until her retirement in 1977, she was a curator in the Department of Botany at the California Academy of Sciences. She added many tree specimens from Golden Gate Park to the herbaria after noticing they were not well documented.

She successfully battled the proposed Panhandle Freeway addition to the Central Freeway in San Francisco in 1960 and defended the rare dune tansy.

In 1976 she launched Pacific Horticulture magazine, after editing the Journal of the California Horticultural Society (1945–1975) for several years. She was also an Associate at the Jepson Herbarium at the University of California, Berkeley, and a collaborator on The Jepson Manual project.

In 2002 she was awarded with the Royal Horticultural Society's Gold Veitch Memorial Medal.

In 2004, Dr. Elizabeth McClintock died peacefully at a convalescent home in Santa Rosa, California at the age of 92.
