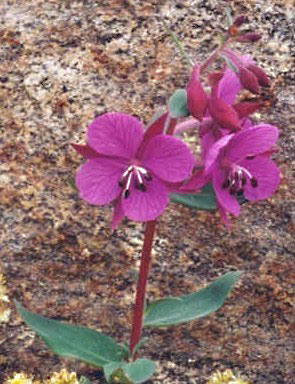
- Chamaenerion latifolium

Scientific classification
- Kingdom: Plantae
- Clade: Tracheophytes
- Clade: Angiosperms
- Clade: Eudicots
- Clade: Rosids
- Order: Myrtales
- Family: Onagraceae; Juss.

Type genus
- Oenothera L.

Subfamilies
- Ludwigioideae; Onagroideae

Synonyms
- Circaeaceae Bercht. & J.Presl; Epilobiaceae Vent.; Jussiaeaceae Martinov; Oenotheraceae C.C.Robin

= Onagraceae =

Onagraceae Temporal range: Maastrichtian - recent

Family of flowering plants

The Onagraceae are a family of flowering plants known as the willowherb family or evening primrose family. They include about 650 species of herbs, shrubs, and trees in 17 genera. The family is widespread, occurring on every continent from boreal to tropical regions.

The family includes a number of popular garden plants, including evening primroses (Oenothera) and fuchsias (Fuchsia). Some, particularly the willowherbs (Epilobium), are common weeds in gardens and rapidly colonize disturbed habitats in the wild. One such species is fireweed (Chamaenerion angustifolium).

The family is characterised by flowers with usually four sepals and petals; in some genera, such as Fuchsia, the sepals are as brightly coloured as the petals.

The seeds are generally very small. In some genera, such as Epilobium, they have tufts of hairs and are dispersed on the wind. In others, such as Fuchsia, the seeds develop in juicy berries dispersed by animals. The leaves are commonly opposite or whorled, but are spirally arranged in some species; in most, they are simple and lanceolate in shape. The pollen grains in many genera are loosely held together by viscin threads. Most bees cannot collect it, and only bees with specialized morphologies can effectively pollinate the flowers; nearly all bee taxa that visit the flowers are oligoleges specialized on the family Onagraceae.

The family was named after the genus Onagra (now known as Oenothera) in 1836 by John Lindley in the second edition of A Natural System of Botany.

== Distribution ==
Species richness map of the Onagraceae family across WGSRPD botanical countries.

Onagraceae species are found on every continent except Antarctica, although diversity is highest in California and adjacent areas. Most species are found in temperate climates.

== Genera ==
=== Subfamily Ludwigioideae ===
- Ludwigia L.

=== Subfamily Onagroideae ===
Tribe Circaeeae

- Circaea L.
- Fuchsia L.
- Hemifuchsia Herrera

Tribe Epilobieae

- Chamaenerion Ség.
- Epilobium L.

Tribe Gongylocarpeae

- Gongylocarpus Schltdl. & Cham.

Tribe Hauyeae

- Hauya DC.

Tribe Lopezieae

- Lopezia Cav.
- Megacorax Elizondo et al.

Tribe Onagreae

- Camissonia Link
- Camissoniopsis W.L.Wagner & Hoch
- Chylismia (Torr. & A.Gray) Raim.
- Chylismiella (Munz) W.L.Wagner & Hoch
- Clarkia Pursh
- Eremothera (P.H.Raven) W.L.Wagner & Hoch
- Eulobus Nutt. ex Torr. & A.Gray
- Gayophytum A.Juss.
- Neoholmgrenia W.L.Wagner & Hoch
- Oenothera L.
- Taraxia (Torr. & A.Gray) Raim.
- Tetrapteron (Munz) W.L. Wagner & Hoch
- Xylonagra Donn.Sm. & Rose

Several genera are synonymized but appear often in older literature as belonging to the previous genera. For example Calylophus and Gaura, which have both been absorbed into Oenothera. Likewise Eucharidium is a synonym of Clarkia.

== Gallery ==
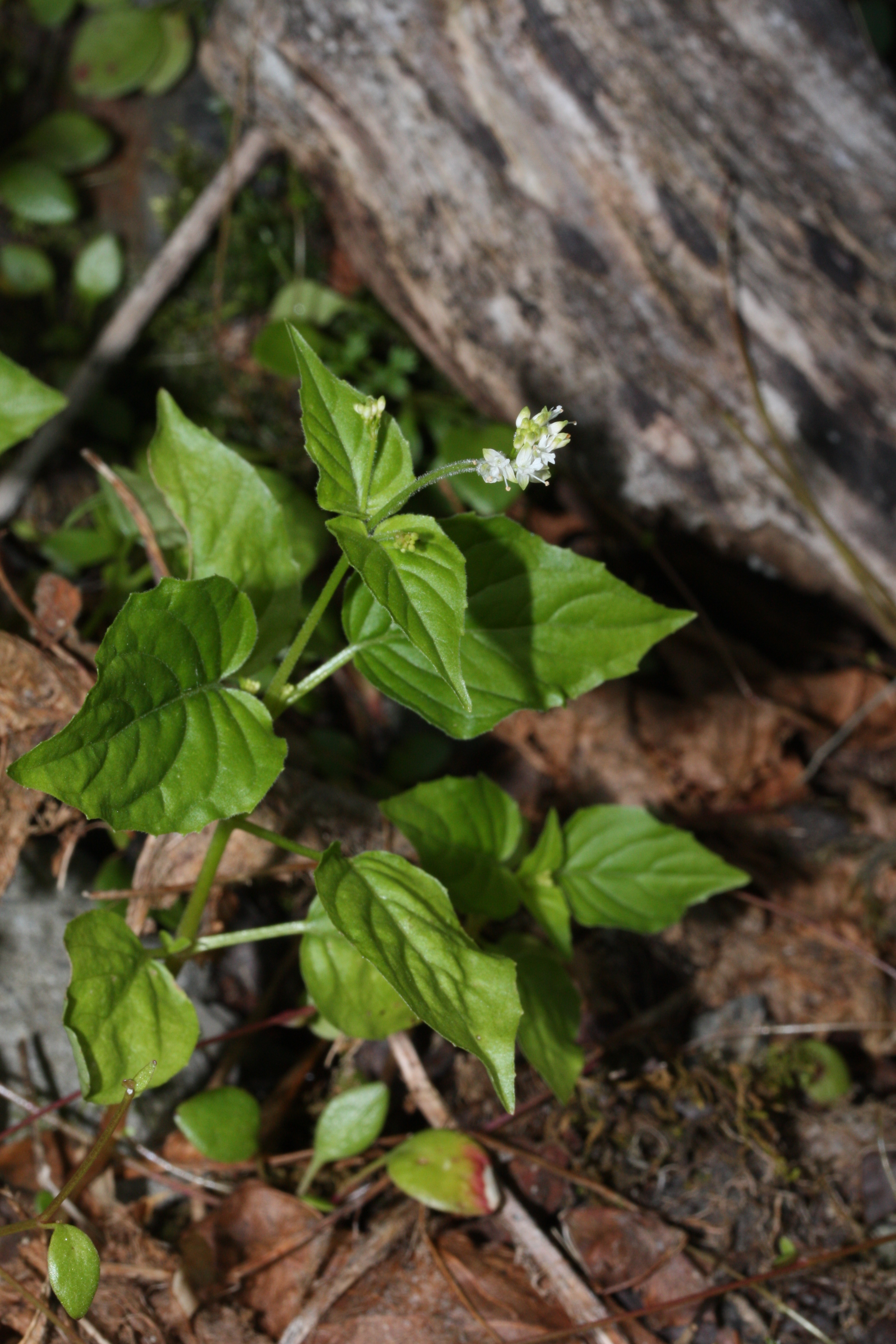
Circaea alpina

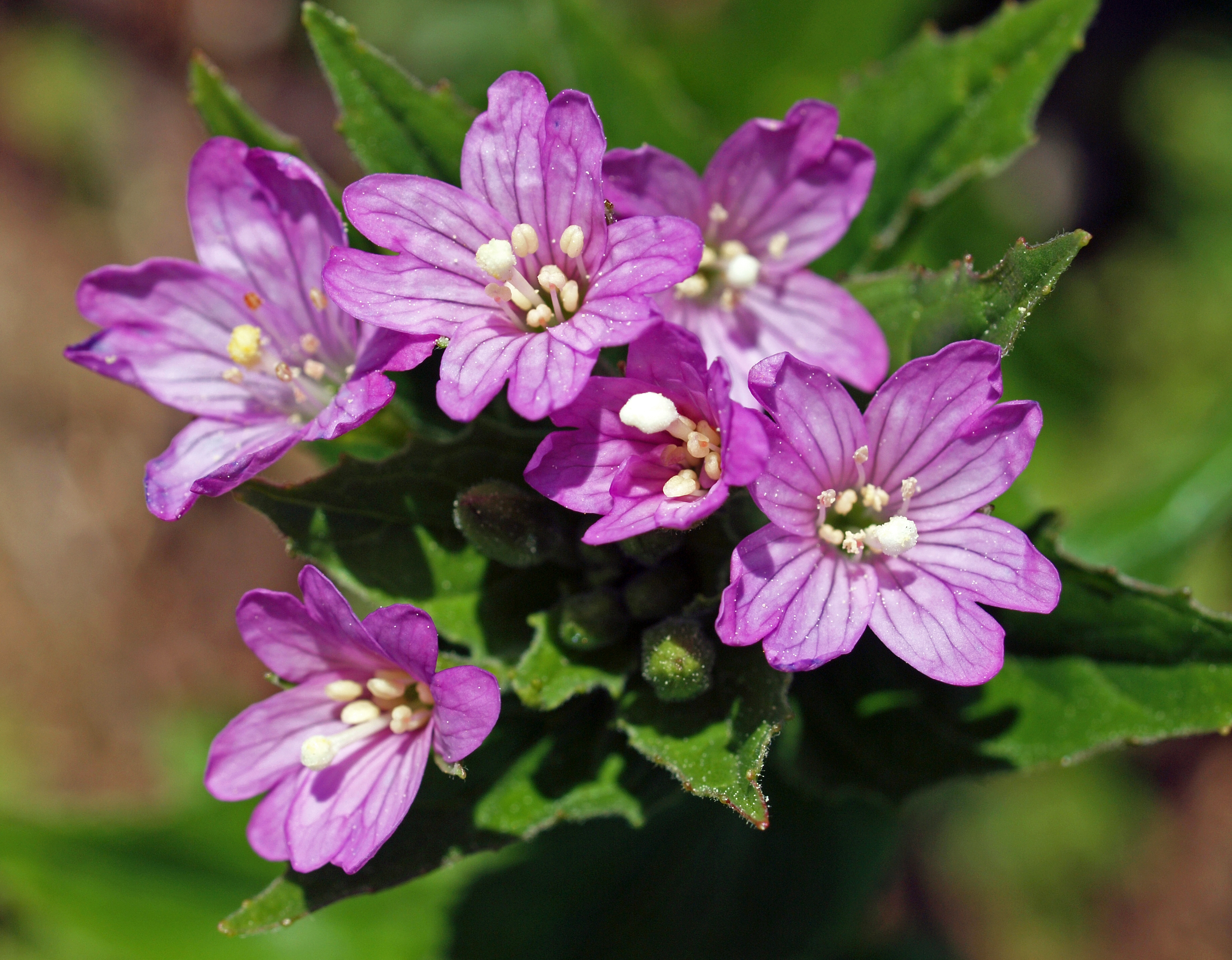
Epilobium alpestre

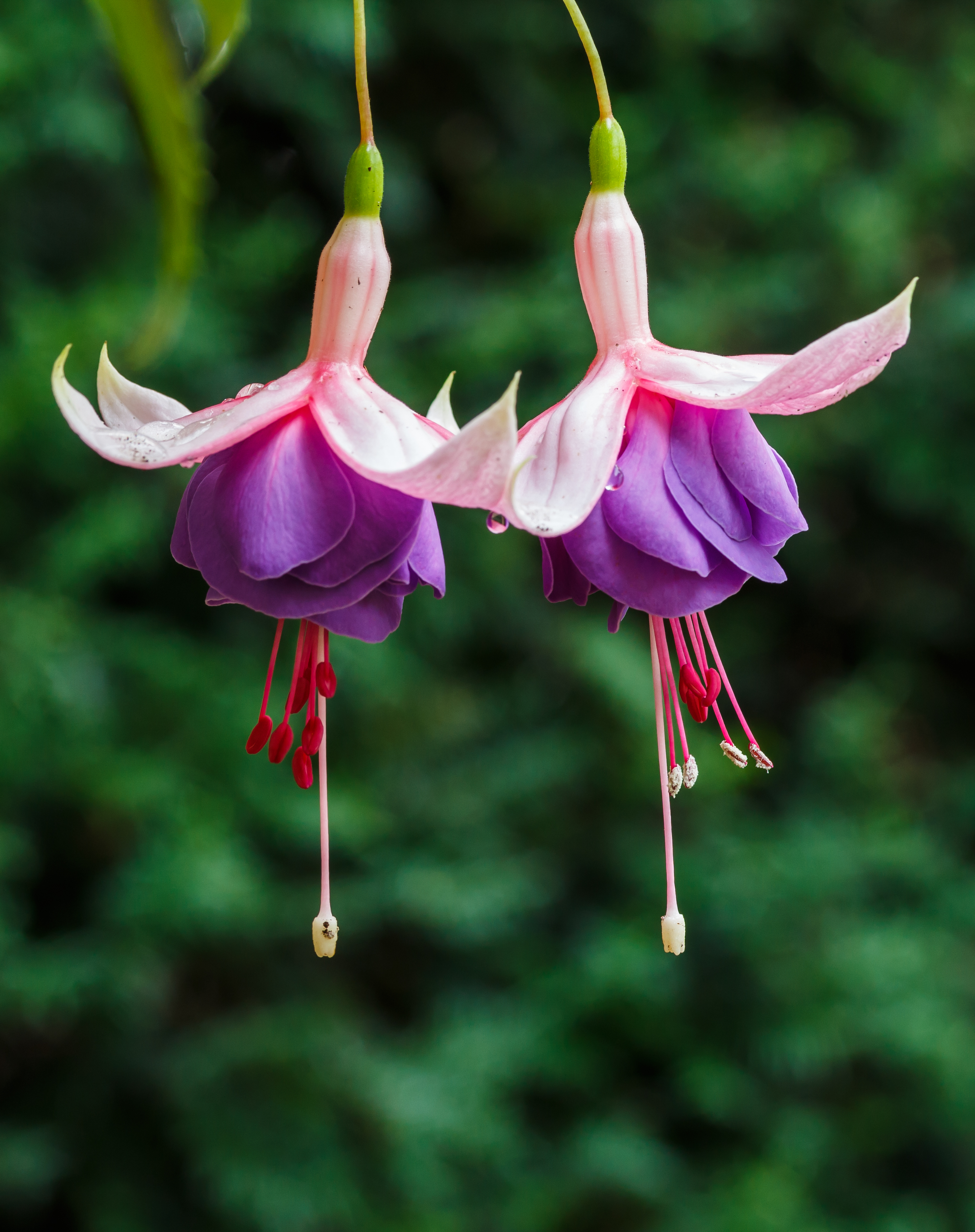
Fuchsia 'Cymon'

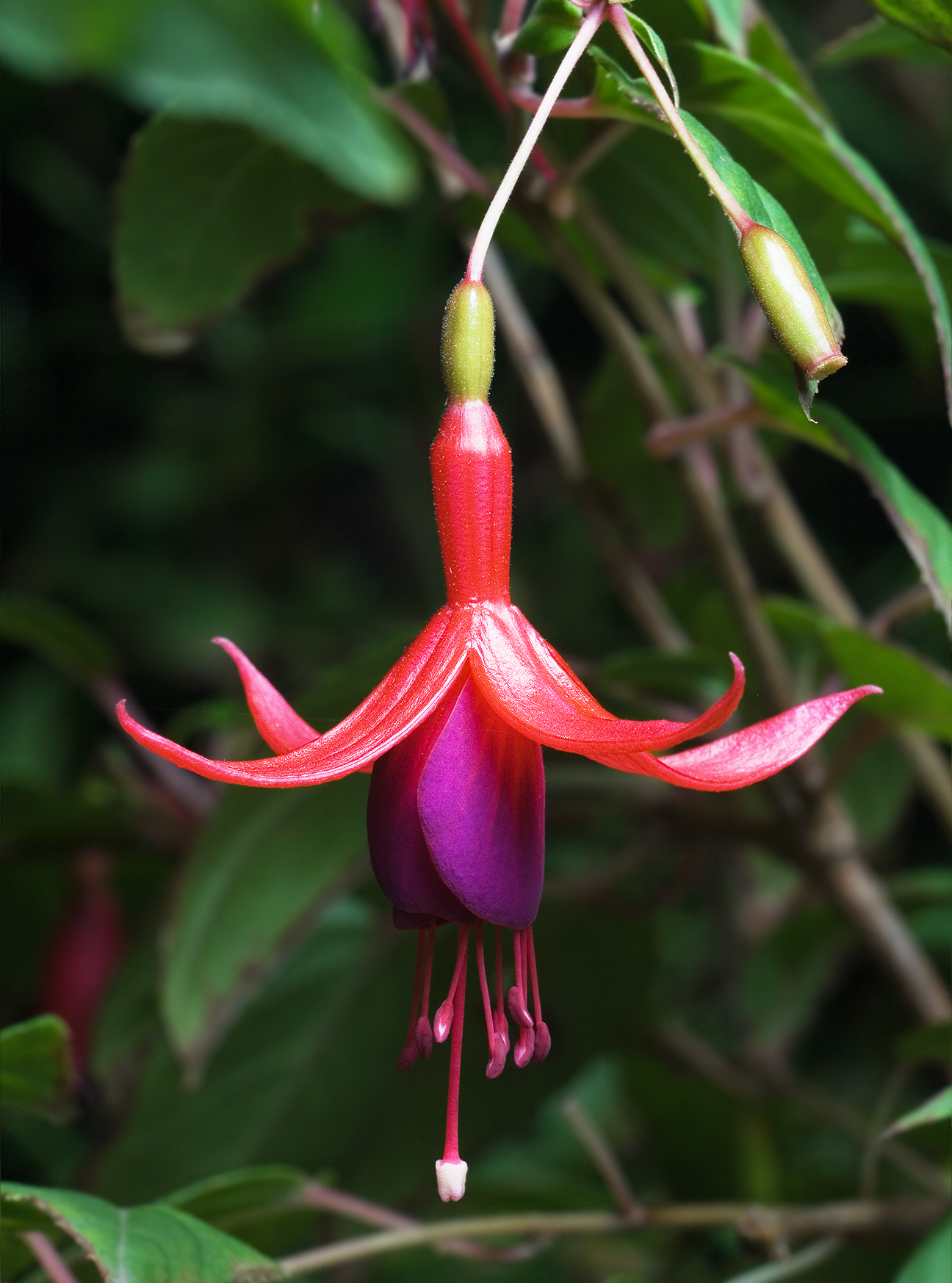
F. magellanica

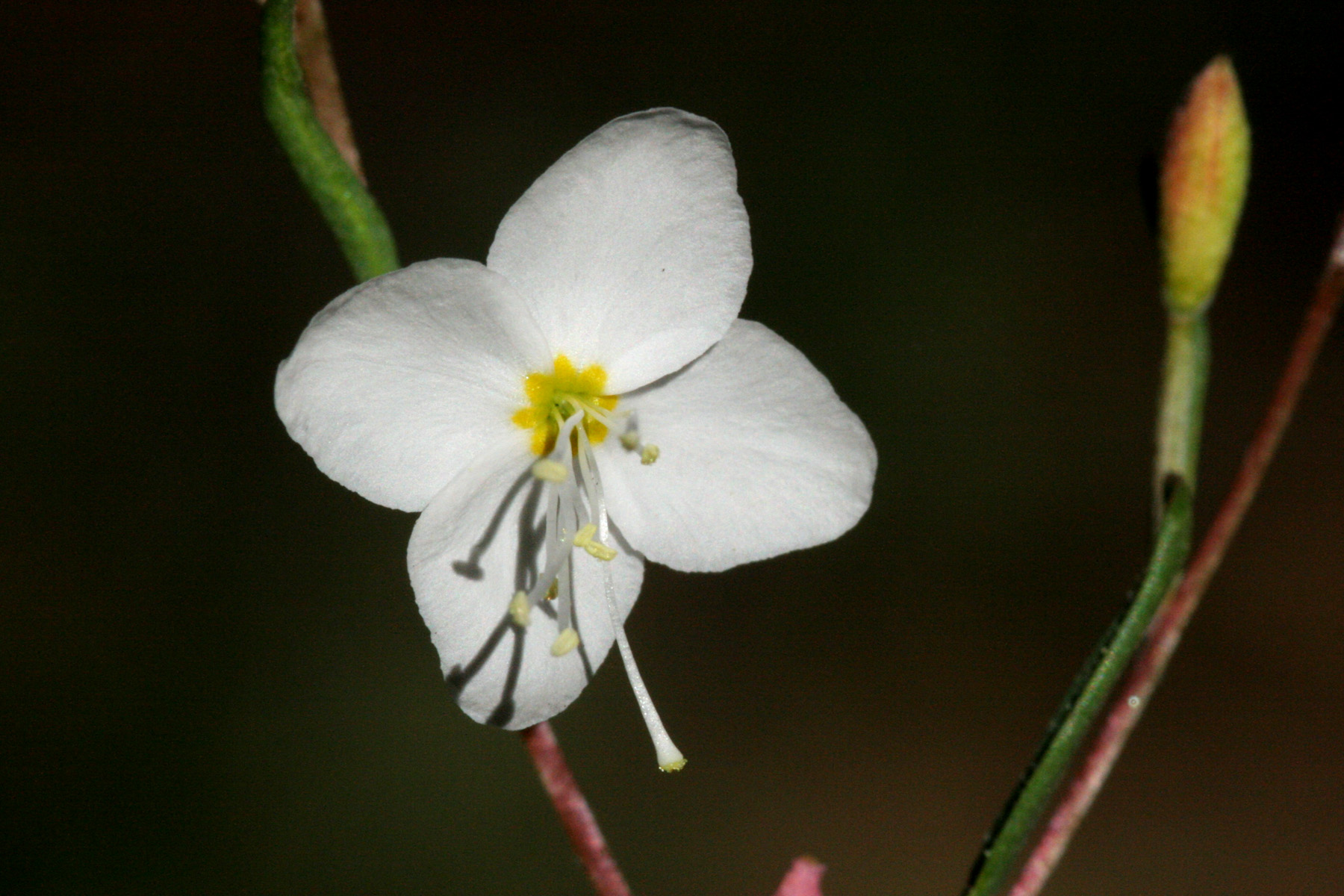
Gayophytum heterozygum

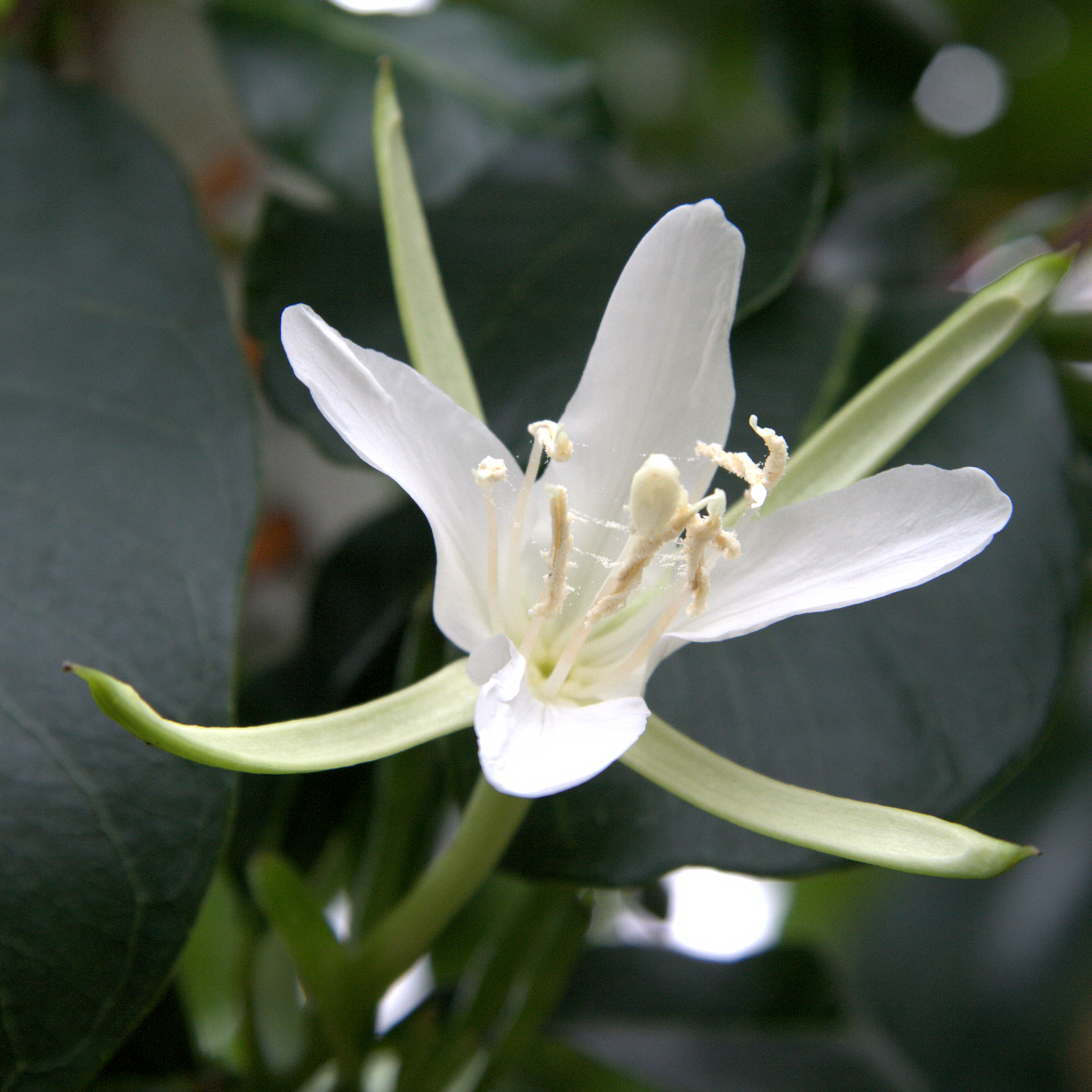
Hauya heydeana

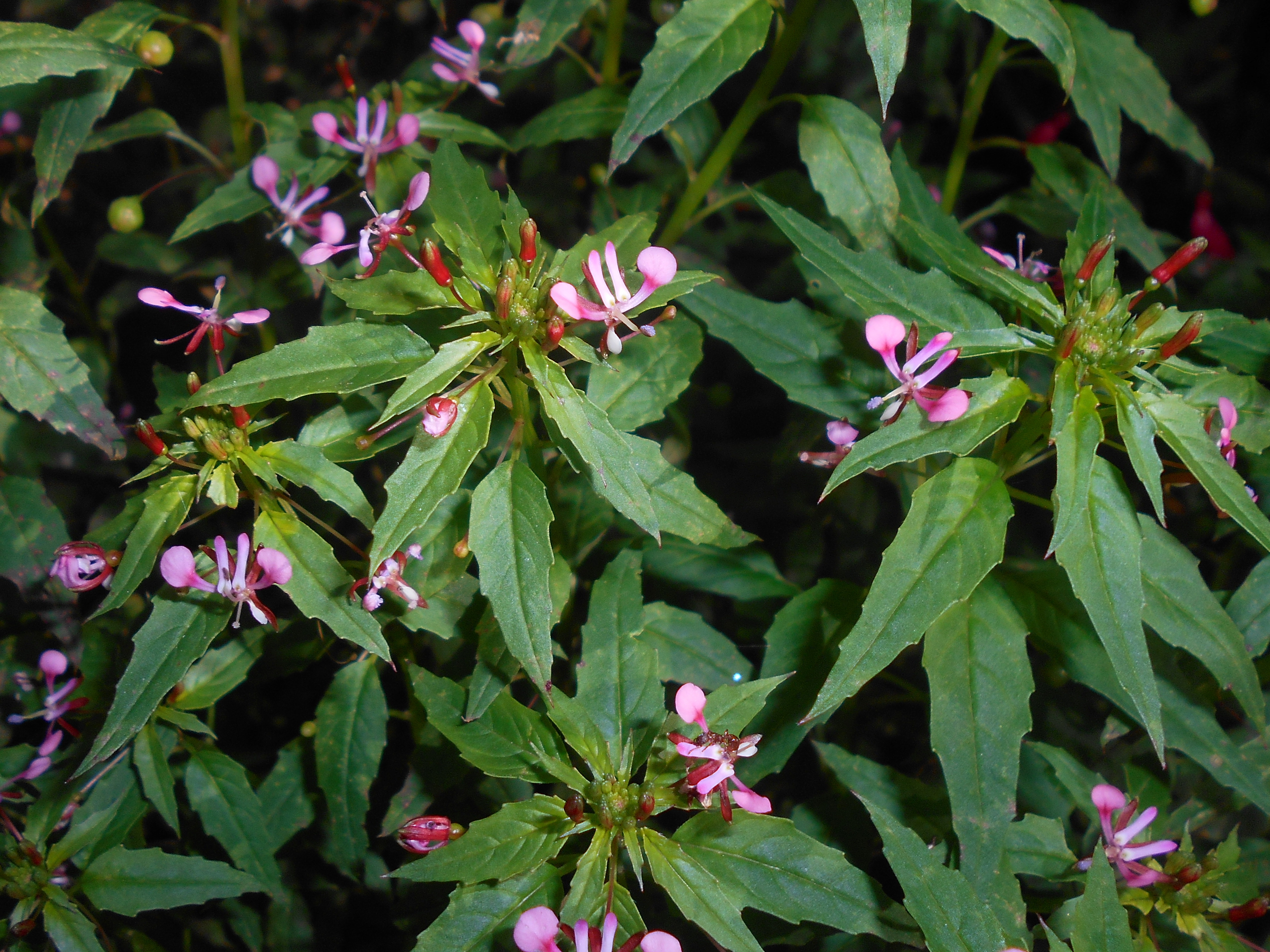
Lopezia coronata

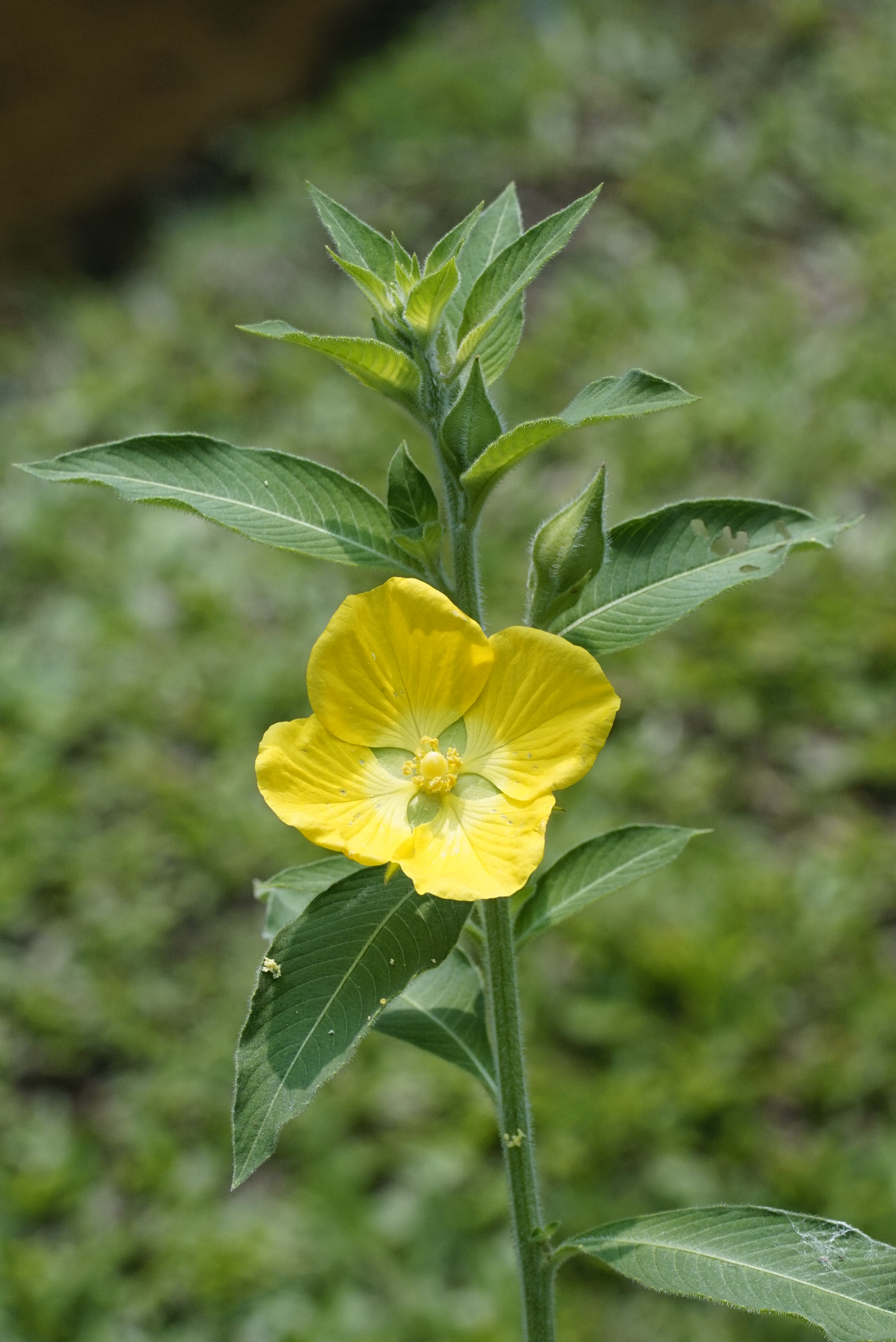
Ludwigia peruviana

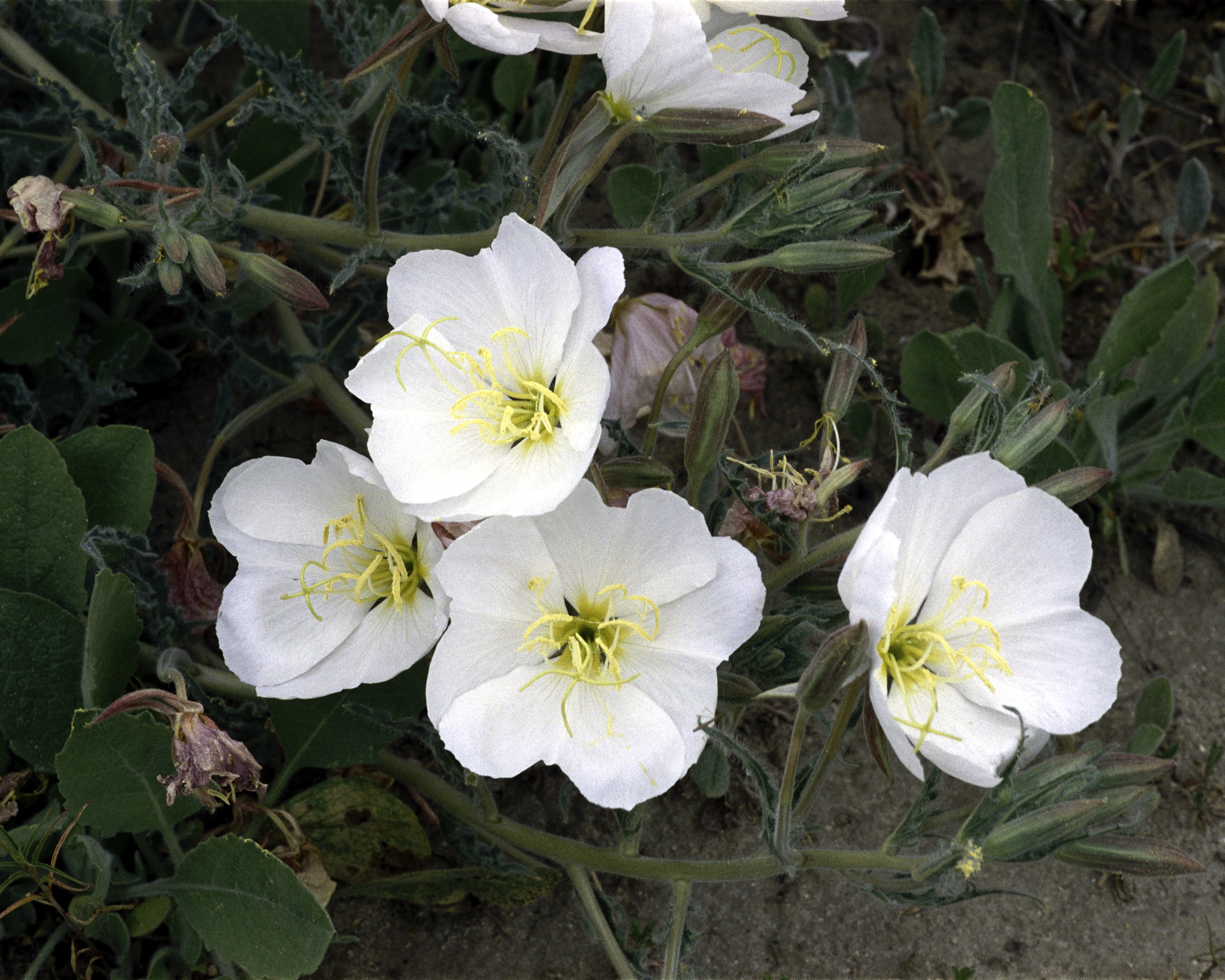
Oenothera deltoides ssp. howellii

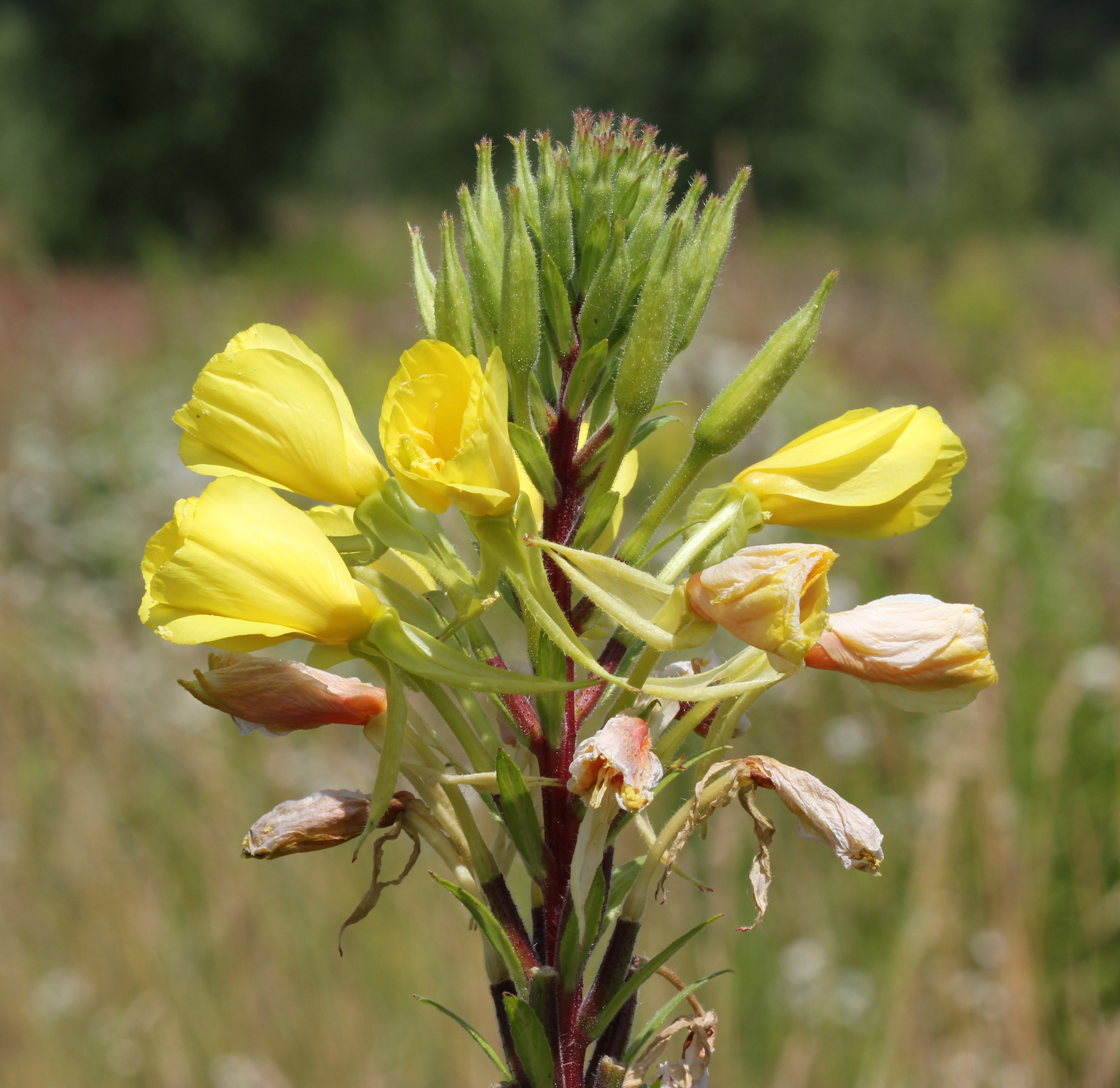
O. biennis
