= Patanotis metallidias =

Scientific classification
- Kingdom: Animalia
- Phylum: Arthropoda
- Class: Insecta
- Order: Lepidoptera
- Family: Momphidae
- Genus: Patanotis
- Species: P. metallidias

Binomial name
- Patanotis metallidias Meyrick, 1913

Species of moth

Patanotis metallidias is a moth of the family Momphidae first described by Edward Meyrick in 1913. It is found in Sri Lanka.
