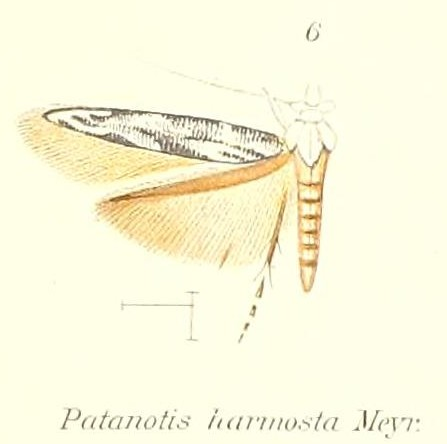
- Patanotis harmosta

Scientific classification
- Kingdom: Animalia
- Phylum: Arthropoda
- Class: Insecta
- Order: Lepidoptera
- Family: Momphidae
- Genus: Patanotis; Meyrick, 1913

= Patanotis =

Genus of moths

Patanotis is a genus of moths in the family Momphidae. The species of this genus are found in Sri Lanka.

== Species ==
- Patanotis harmosta Meyrick, 1913
- Patanotis metallidias Meyrick, 1913
