= List of Canadian plants by family O =

Main page: List of Canadian plants by family

The following families of vascular plants are listed as occurring in Canada:

For mosses of Canada, see:

== Oedipodiaceae ==
- Oedipodium griffithianum

== Oleaceae ==
- Fraxinus americana — white ash
- Fraxinus latifolia — Oregon ash
- Fraxinus nigra — black ash
- Fraxinus pennsylvanica — green ash
- Fraxinus profunda — pumpkin ash
- Fraxinus quadrangulata — blue ash

== Onagraceae ==
- Boisduvalia densiflora — denseflower spike-primrose
- Boisduvalia glabella — smooth spike-primrose
- Calylophus serrulatus — yellow evening-primrose
- Camissonia andina — Blackfoot River suncup
- Camissonia breviflora — shortflower suncup
- Camissonia contorta — dwarf contorted suncup
- Circaea alpina — small enchanter's-nightshade
- Circaea lutetiana — southern broadleaf enchanter's-nightshade
- Circaea x intermedia — intermediate enchanger's-nightshade
- Clarkia amoena — farewell-to-spring
- Clarkia pulchella — largeflower clarkia
- Clarkia purpurea — winecup clarkia
- Clarkia rhomboidea — tongue clarkia
- Epilobium anagallidifolium — alpine willowherb
- Epilobium angustifolium — fireweed
- Epilobium arcticum — arctic willowherb
- Epilobium brachycarpum — panicled willowherb
- Epilobium ciliatum — hairy willowherb
- Epilobium clavatum — clavate-fruit willowherb
- Epilobium coloratum — purpleleaf willowherb
- Epilobium davuricum — Dahuria willowherb
- Epilobium foliosum — California willowherb
- Epilobium glaberrimum — glaucous willowherb
- Epilobium halleanum — glandular willowherb
- Epilobium hornemannii — Hornemann's willowherb
- Epilobium lactiflorum — whiteflower willowherb
- Epilobium latifolium — river beauty
- Epilobium leptocarpum — slender-fruited willowherb
- Epilobium leptophyllum — linear-leaved willowherb
- Epilobium luteum — yellow willowherb
- Epilobium minutum — smallflower willowherb
- Epilobium mirabile — Olimple Mountain willowherb
- Epilobium oregonense — Oregon willowherb
- Epilobium palustre — marsh willowherb
- Epilobium saximontanum — Rocky Mountain willowherb
- Epilobium strictum — downy willowherb
- Epilobium x wisconsinense
- Gaura biennis — biennial gaura
- Gaura coccinea — scarlet gaura
- Gayophytum diffusum — diffuse groundsmoke
- Gayophytum humile — low groundsmoke
- Gayophytum racemosum — racemed groundsmoke
- Gayophytum ramosissimum — much-branch groundsmoke
- Ludwigia alternifolia — bushy seedbox
- Ludwigia palustris — marsh seedbox
- Ludwigia polycarpa — many-fruit false-loosestrife
- Oenothera biennis — common evening-primrose
- Oenothera caespitosa — tufted evening-primrose
- Oenothera clelandii — lesser four-point evening-primrose
- Oenothera elata — Hooker's evening-primrose
- Oenothera flava — long-tubed evening-primrose
- Oenothera fruticosa — narrowleaf sundrops
- Oenothera nuttallii — white-stemmed evening-primrose
- Oenothera oakesiana — Oakes' evening-primrose
- Oenothera pallida — pale evening-primrose
- Oenothera parviflora — northern evening-primrose
- Oenothera perennis — small sundrops
- Oenothera pilosella — meadow evening-primrose
- Oenothera villosa — hairy evening-primrose

== Ophioglossaceae ==
- Botrychium acuminatum — moonwort
- Botrychium ascendens — upward-lobed moonwort
- Botrychium boreale — northern moonwort
- Botrychium campestre — prairie dunewort
- Botrychium crenulatum — crenulate moonwort
- Botrychium dissectum — cutleaf grapefern
- Botrychium hesperium — western moonwort
- Botrychium lanceolatum — triangle grapefern
- Botrychium lineare — narrowleaf grapefern
- Botrychium lunaria — moonwort grapefern
- Botrychium matricariifolium — chamomile grapefern
- Botrychium minganense — Mingan's moonwort
- Botrychium montanum — mountain moonwort
- Botrychium mormo — little goblin moonwort
- Botrychium multifidum — leathery grapefern
- Botrychium oneidense — bluntlobe grapefern
- Botrychium pallidum — pale moonwort
- Botrychium paradoxum — peculiar moonwort
- Botrychium pedunculosum — stalked moonwort
- Botrychium pinnatum — northern moonwort
- Botrychium pseudopinnatum — false daisyleaf grapefern
- Botrychium rugulosum — rugulose grapefern
- Botrychium simplex — least grapefern
- Botrychium spathulatum — spoonleaf moonwort
- Botrychium tunux
- Botrychium virginianum — rattlesnake fern
- Botrychium x watertonense
- Botrychium yaaxudakeit
- Ophioglossum pusillum — northern adder's-tongue
- Ophioglossum vulgatum — southern adder's-tongue

== Orchidaceae ==
- Amerorchis rotundifolia — round-leaved orchis
- Aplectrum hyemale — puttyroot
- Arethusa bulbosa — dragon's mouth
- Calopogon tuberosus — tuberous grass-pink
- Calypso bulbosa — fairy slipper
- Cephalanthera austiniae — phantom orchid
- Coeloglossum viride — longbract green orchis
- Corallorhiza maculata — spotted coralroot
- Corallorhiza mertensiana — Merten's coralroot
- Corallorhiza odontorhiza — autumn coralroot
- Corallorhiza striata — striped coralroot
- Corallorhiza trifida — early coralroot
- Cypripedium acaule — pink lady's-slipper
- Cypripedium arietinum — ram's-head lady's-slipper
- Cypripedium candidum — small white lady's-slipper
- Cypripedium guttatum — spotted lady's-slipper
- Cypripedium montanum — mountain lady's-slipper
- Cypripedium parviflorum — American yellow lady's-slipper
- Cypripedium passerinum — sparrow's-egg lady's-slipper
- Cypripedium reginae — showy lady's-slipper
- Cypripedium x andrewsii — Andrews' lady's-slipper
- Cypripedium x columbianum — Columbian lady's-slipper
- Cypripedium x favillianum
- Cypripedium x landonii — Landon's lady's-slipper
- Dactylorhiza praetermissa — southern marsh orchid
- Epipactis gigantea — giant helleborine
- Galearis spectabilis — showy orchis
- Goodyera oblongifolia — giant rattlesnake-plantain
- Goodyera pubescens — downy rattlesnake-plantain
- Goodyera repens — dwarf rattlesnake-plantain
- Goodyera tesselata — checkered rattlesnake-plantain
- Isotria medeoloides — small whorled pogonia
- Isotria verticillata — large whorled pogonia
- Liparis liliifolia — large twayblade
- Liparis loeselii — Lösel's twayblade
- Malaxis monophyllos – white adder's mouth
- Malaxis paludosa — bog adder's-mouth
- Malaxis unifolia — green adder's-mouth
- Neottia auriculata — auricled twayblade
- Neottia australis — southern twayblade
- Neottia borealis — northern twayblade
- Neottia caurina — western twayblade
- Neottia convallarioides — broad-leaved twayblade
- Neottia cordata — heartleaf twayblade
- Neottia x veltmanii — Veltman's twayblade
- Piperia candida — white piperia
- Piperia elegans — hillside rein orchid
- Piperia elongata — denseflower rein orchid
- Piperia transversa — royal rein orchid
- Piperia unalascensis — Alaska rein orchid
- Platanthera albida — vanilla-scent bog orchid
- Platanthera aquilonis
- Platanthera blephariglottis — white-fringe orchis
- Platanthera chorisiana — Choriso bog orchid
- Platanthera clavellata — small green woodland orchid
- Platanthera dilatata — leafy white orchis
- Platanthera flava — southern rein orchid
- Platanthera grandiflora — large purple-fringe orchis
- Platanthera hookeri — Hooker's orchis
- Platanthera hyperborea — leafy northern green orchid
- Platanthera lacera — green-fringe orchis
- Platanthera leucophaea — eastern prairie white-fringed orchid
- Platanthera obtusata — small northern bog orchid
- Platanthera orbiculata — large roundleaf orchid
- Platanthera praeclara — western prairie white-fringed orchid
- Platanthera psycodes — small purple-fringe orchis
- Platanthera stricta — slender bog orchid
- Platanthera x andrewsii — Andrews' platanthera
- Platanthera x hollandiae — Holland's platanthera
- Platanthera x keenanii — Keenan's platanthera
- Platanthera x media
- Platanthera x reznicekii — Reznicek's platanthera
- Platanthera x vossii — Voss' platanthera
- Pogonia ophioglossoides — rose pogonia
- Spiranthes casei — Case's ladies'-tresses
- Spiranthes cernua — nodding ladies'-tresses
- Spiranthes lacera — southern slender ladies'-tresses
- Spiranthes lucida — shining ladies'-tresses
- Spiranthes magnicamporum — Great Plains ladies'-tresses
- Spiranthes ochroleuca — yellow nodding ladies'-tresses
- Spiranthes ovalis — lesser ladies'-tresses
- Spiranthes romanzoffiana — hooded ladies'-tresses
- Spiranthes x intermedia
- Spiranthes x simpsonii — Simpson's ladies'-tresses
- Triphora trianthophora — nodding pogonia

== Orobanchaceae ==
- Boschniakia hookeri — Vancouver groundcone
- Boschniakia rossica — northern groundcone
- Boschniakia strobilacea — California groundcone
- Conopholis americana — American cancer-root
- Epifagus virginiana — beechdrops
- Orobanche californica — California broomrape
- Orobanche corymbosa — flat-top broomrape
- Orobanche fasciculata — clustered broomrape
- Orobanche ludoviciana — Louisiana broomrape
- Orobanche pinorum — pine broomrape
- Orobanche uniflora — one-flowered broomrape

== Orthotrichaceae ==
- Amphidium californicum
- Amphidium lapponicum
- Amphidium mougeotii
- Drummondia prorepens
- Orthotrichum affine
- Orthotrichum alpestre
- Orthotrichum anomalum
- Orthotrichum consimile
- Orthotrichum cupulatum
- Orthotrichum gymnostomum
- Orthotrichum hallii
- Orthotrichum laevigatum
- Orthotrichum lyellii
- Orthotrichum obtusifolium — blunt bristle-moss
- Orthotrichum ohioense
- Orthotrichum pallens
- Orthotrichum pellucidum
- Orthotrichum pulchellum
- Orthotrichum pumilum
- Orthotrichum pusillum
- Orthotrichum pylaisii
- Orthotrichum rivulare
- Orthotrichum rupestre
- Orthotrichum sordidum
- Orthotrichum speciosum
- Orthotrichum stellatum
- Orthotrichum stramineum
- Orthotrichum strangulatum
- Orthotrichum striatum
- Orthotrichum tenellum
- Ulota coarctata
- Ulota crispa
- Ulota curvifolia
- Ulota drummondii
- Ulota hutchinsiae
- Ulota megalospora
- Ulota obtusiuscula
- Ulota phyllantha
- Zygodon conoideus
- Zygodon gracilis
- Zygodon reinwardtii
- Zygodon viridissimus

== Osmundaceae ==
- Osmunda claytoniana — interrupted fern
- Osmunda spectabilis — royal fern
- Osmundastrum cinnamomeum — cinnamon fern

== Oxalidaceae ==
- Oxalis dillenii — Dillen's woodsorrel
- Oxalis montana — white woodsorrel
- Oxalis oregana — Oregon woodsorrel
- Oxalis stricta — common yellow woodsorrel
- Oxalis suksdorfii — western yellow oxalis
