= List of Canadian plants by genus B =

This is a partial list of the plant species considered native to Canada.

Many of the plants seen in Canada were introduced, either intentionally or accidentally.

N indicates native and X indicates exotic. Those plants whose status is unknown are marked with a ?.

Due to Canada's biodiversity, this page is divided.

== Ba ==
- Ballota
  - X Ballota nigra — black horehound
- Baptisia
  - X Baptisia australis — blue wild indigo, blue false indigo
  - N Baptisia tinctoria — yellow wild-indigo
- Barbarea
  - N Barbarea orthoceras — erect-fruit wintercress
  - X Barbarea vulgaris — yellow rocket, common wintercress
- Bartonia
  - N Bartonia paniculata subsp. paniculata — twining screwstem, branched bartonia Threatened
  - N Bartonia virginica — yellow screwstem, yellow bartonia
- Bartsia
  - N Bartsia alpina — velvetbells, alpine bartsia
- Bassia
  - X Bassia hyssopifolia — five-horn smotherweed, five-hook bassia, thorn orache

== Be ==
- Beckmannia
  - N Beckmannia syzigachne — American slough grass
- Bellis
  - X Bellis perennis — English daisy
- Berberis
  - X Berberis aquifolium — Oregon grape, Oregon hollygrape, holly barberry
  - X Berberis repens — creeping mahonia, creeping grape holly, creeping barberry
  - X Berberis thunbergii — Japanese barberry, purple Japanese barberry
  - X Berberis vulgaris — European barberry, common barberry
  - X Berberis × ottawensis (B. thunbergii × B. vulgaris) — Ottawa barberry
- Berteroa
  - X Berteroa incana — hoary alyssum, hoary false madwort
- Berula
  - N Berula erecta — lesser water-parsnip
- Betula
  - N Betula alleghaniensis — yellow birch
  - N Betula cordifolia — heartleaf birch, mountain white birch, mountain paper birch
  - N Betula glandulosa — American dwarf birch, glandular birch, scrub birch, dwarf resin birch, resin birch, tundra dwarf birch
  - N Betula lenta — sweet birch, cherry birch
  - N Betula minor — dwarf white birch
  - N Betula neoalaskana — Alaska birch, Alaskan paper birch, Alaska white birch
  - N Betula occidentalis — water birch, western birch, western river birch, spring birch
  - N Betula papyrifera — paper birch, white birch, canoe birch
  - X Betula pendula — European white birch, weeping birch, silver birch
  - N Betula populifolia — grey birch, fire birch, old field birch, poverty birch
  - X Betula pubescens — downy birch, European white birch
  - N Betula pumila — dwarf birch, bog birch, swamp birch
  - N Betula × neoborealis (B. occidentalis × B. pumila)
  - N Betula × purpusii (B. alleghaniensis × B. pumila)
  - N Betula × sandbergii (B. papyrifera × B. pumila) — Sandberg's birch
  - N Betula × sargentii (B. glandulosa × B. pumila) — Sargent's birch

== Bi ==
- Bidens
  - X Bidens aristosa — tickseed beggarticks
  - X Bidens bipinnata — Spanish needles
  - N Bidens cernua — nodding beggarticks, nodding burr marigold
  - N Bidens connata — purplestem beggarticks, purplestem swamp beggarticks, connate beggarticks, southern tickseed
  - N Bidens discoidea — swamp beggarticks, small beggarticks, discoid beggarticks, few-bracted beggarticks
  - N Bidens frondosa — Devil's beggarticks, Devil's pitchfork, stick-tight, largeleaf beggarticks
  - N Bidens hyperborea — estuary beggarticks, coastal beggarticks, northern estuarine beggarticks, seacliff beggarticks
  - N Bidens laevis — smooth bur-marigold
  - X Bidens pilosa — hairy beggarticks
  - X Bidens polylepis — awnless beggarticks
  - N Bidens tripartita — threepart beggarticks, trifid burr-marigold
  - N Bidens vulgata — tall beggarticks, stick-tight, big Devil's beggarticks

== Bl ==
- Blephilia
  - N Blephilia ciliata — downy woodmint
  - N Blephilia hirsuta — hairy woodmint
- Blysmus
  - N Blysmus rufus — red bulrush

== Bo ==
- Boehmeria
  - N Boehmeria cylindrica — false nettle, bog-hemp, smallspike false nettle
- Bolboschoenus
  - N Bolboschoenus fluviatilis — river bulrush, river clubrush
  - N Bolboschoenus maritimus — saltmarsh bulrush, bayonet grass, saltmarsh clubrush
- Borago
  - X Borago officinalis — common borage, beeplant, beebread
- Botrychium
  - N Botrychium acuminatum — pointed moonwort
  - N Botrychium ascendens — upswept moonwort, triangle-lobed moonwort
  - N Botrychium campestre — prairie moonwort, prairie dunewort
  - N Botrychium dissectum — lacyleaf grapefern, cutleaf grapefern, cutleaf moonwort
  - N Botrychium hesperium — western moonwort
  - N Botrychium lanceolatum — lanceleaf grapefern, triangle moonwort
  - N Botrychium lunaria — common moonwort, moonwort grapefern
  - N Botrychium matricariifolium — daisyleaf moonwort, matricary grapefern, matricary moonwort, chamomile grapefern
  - N Botrychium minganense — Mingan's moonwort
  - N Botrychium multifidum — leathery grapefern
  - N Botrychium oneidense — Lake Oneida grapefern, blunt-lobed grapefern
  - N Botrychium pallidum — pale moonwort
  - N Botrychium pseudopinnatum — false northwestern moonwort
  - N Botrychium rugulosum — St. Lawrence grapefern, rugulose grapefern, ternate grapefern
  - N Botrychium simplex — little grapefern, least moonwort
  - N Botrychium spathulatum — spatulate moonwort, spoonleaf moonwort
  - N Botrychium virginianum — rattlesnake fern
- Bouteloua
  - N Bouteloua curtipendula — sideoats grama

== Br ==
- Brachyelytrum
  - N Brachyelytrum erectum var. erectum — bearded shorthusk
  - N Brachyelytrum erectum var. glabratum — northern shorthusk
- Brasenia
  - N Brasenia schreberi — watershield, purple wendock
- Brassica
  - X Brassica juncea — Chinese mustard, Indian mustard, brown mustard, leaf mustard, Sarepta mustard
  - X Brassica napus — rutabaga, canola, Swedish turnip, rapeseed, colza, oilseed rape, annual rape
  - X Brassica nigra — black mustard
  - X Brassica oleracea — cabbage, cauliflower, broccoli, kale, brussels sprouts, kohlrabi, chou broccoli
- Braya
  - N Braya humilis — low northern rockcress, low braya
- Briza
  - X Briza maxima — big quaking grass, large quaking grass
  - X Briza media — perennial quaking grass
- Bromus
  - X Bromus aleutensis — Aleut brome
  - X Bromus arvensis — field brome
  - X Bromus briziformis — rattlesnake brome
  - X Bromus carinatus — California brome
  - N Bromus ciliatus — fringed brome
  - X Bromus commutatus — meadow brome, hairy brome
  - X Bromus danthoniae — oat brome
  - X Bromus erectus — erect brome, upright brome, meadow brome
  - X Bromus hordeaceus — soft brome
  - X Bromus inermis subsp. inermis — smooth brome, Hungarian brome, awnless brome
  - N Bromus kalmii — Kalm's brome, prairie brome, wild chess
  - N Bromus latiglumis — broad-glumed brome
  - N Bromus nottowayanus — Nottoway brome grass
  - N Bromus pubescens — hairy woodland brome
  - N Bromus pumpellianus subsp. pumpellianus — Pumpell's brome
  - X Bromus racemosus — spiked brome
  - X Bromus secalinus — rye brome, cheat, chess
  - X Bromus squarrosus — corn brome
  - X Bromus sterilis — poverty brome
  - X Bromus tectorum — cheat grass
  - X Bromus × pseudothominii (B. hordeaceus × B. lepidus) — soft brome

== Bu ==
- Buchnera
  - N Buchnera americana — bluehearts Endangered
- Buddleja
  - X Buddleja davidii — butterfly bush, orange-eye, summer lilac
- Buglossoides
  - X Buglossoides arvensis — corn gromwell, bastard alkanet
- Bulbostylis
  - N Bulbostylis capillaris — densetuft hairsedge, threadleaf beakseed
- Bupleurum
  - X Bupleurum rotundifolium — roundleaf thorowax
- Butomus
  - X Butomus umbellatus — flowering rush
