= Northern moonwort =

Northern moonwort is a common name for several ferns and may refer to:

- Botrychium boreale
- Botrychium pinnatum, native to North America
