= Botrychiaceae =

Family of ferns

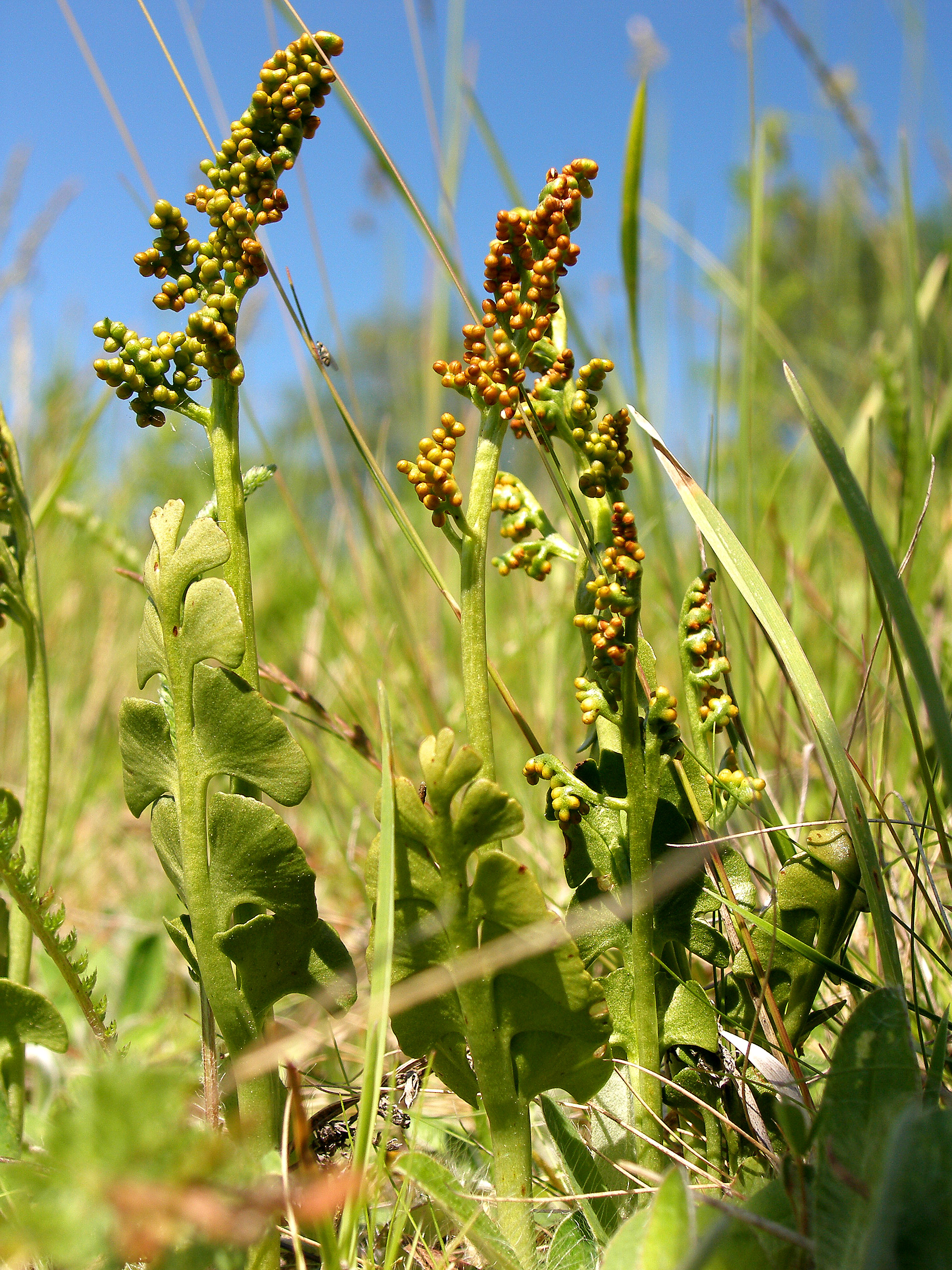
Botrychium lunaria

Botrychiaceae (moonwort family) was recognized as a segregate family of ferns. The family included the genera Botrychium (the moonworts), Botrypus (the rattlesnake fern), and Sceptridium (the grape-ferns). Older fern classifications took a broad circumscription of Botrychium and included the genus in family Ophioglossaceae.

The family is not recognized in the classification of Smith et al., who instead subsume the Botrychiaceae into the Ophioglossaceae.
