= Botrychium onondagense =

Scientific classification
- Kingdom: Plantae
- Clade: Tracheophytes
- Division: Polypodiophyta
- Class: Polypodiopsida
- Order: Ophioglossales
- Family: Ophioglossaceae
- Genus: Botrychium
- Species: B. onondagense

Binomial name
- Botrychium onondagense Underw.

Synonyms
- Botrychium lunaria f. onondagense (Underw.) Butters & Abbe; Botrychium lunaria var. onondagense (Underw.) House

Species of fern

Botrychium onondagense is a species of fern in the family Ophioglossaceae that is closely related to the more common Botrychium lunaria. It is known from many locations in the temperate areas of the Northern Hemisphere including Europe, Russia, Canada, and the United States.

== Taxonomy ==
Botrychium onondagense was first described by Lucien Marcus Underwood in 1903, based on material from the vicinity of Syracuse, in Onondaga County, New York. It was long regarded as a synonym for Botrychium lunaria.
