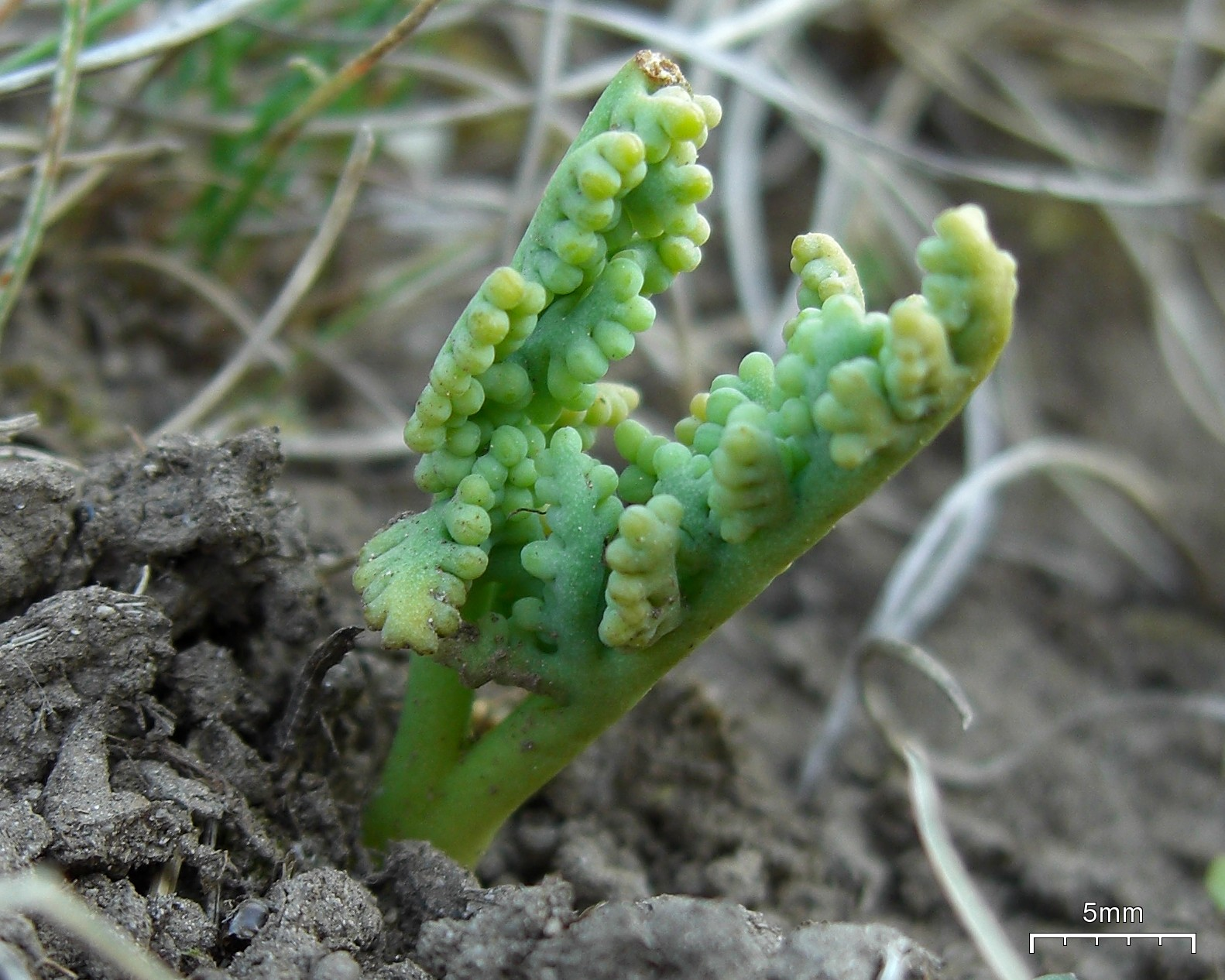

Conservation status
- Vulnerable (NatureServe)

Scientific classification
- Kingdom: Plantae
- Clade: Tracheophytes
- Division: Polypodiophyta
- Class: Polypodiopsida
- Order: Ophioglossales
- Family: Ophioglossaceae
- Genus: Botrychium
- Species: B. paradoxum

Binomial name
- Botrychium paradoxum W.H.Wagner

= Botrychium paradoxum =

North American species of moonwort

Botrychium paradoxum is a species of fern in the family Ophioglossaceae known by the common name peculiar moonwort. It is native to North America, where there are scattered occurrences in Alberta, British Columbia, Saskatchewan, Montana, Oregon, Utah, Washington, and Wyoming.

This plant is unique among the moonworts. While other species generally produce one fertile frond and one sterile, this species produces only the fertile frond. This frond has two segments, both bearing spores. The plant grows up to 15 centimeters (5.9 in) tall. As the leaflike sterile frond is absent, the plant likely obtains much of its energy from mycorrhizae instead of photosynthesis.

This fern grows in the montane, subalpine, and alpine zones in snowfields and western red cedar forests.

== Taxonomy ==
Botrychium paradoxum was first described by Herb Wagner in 1981, based on a specimen collected by him in the Deerlodge National Forest.
