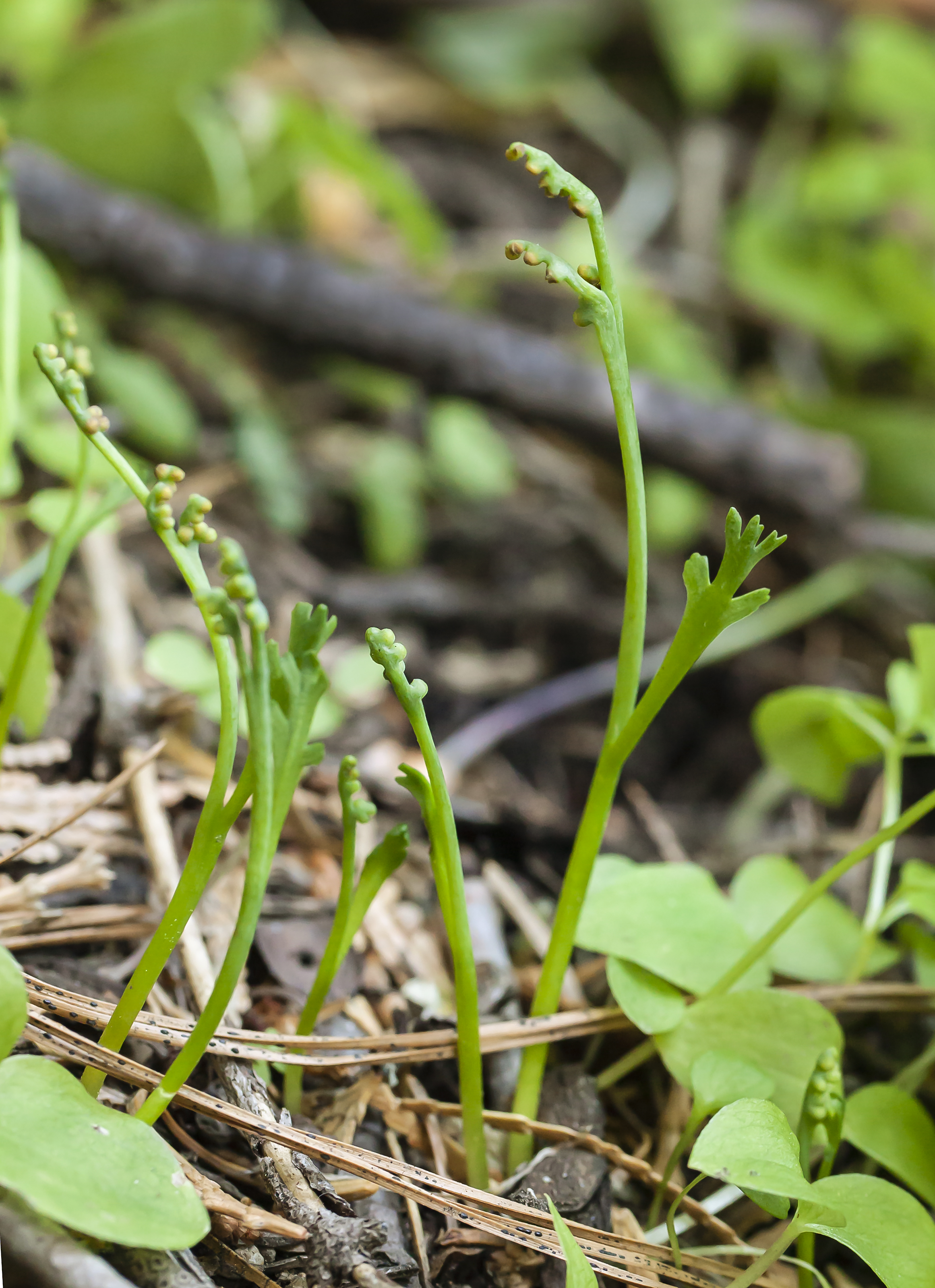

Conservation status
- Vulnerable (NatureServe)

Scientific classification
- Kingdom: Plantae
- Clade: Tracheophytes
- Division: Polypodiophyta
- Class: Polypodiopsida
- Order: Ophioglossales
- Family: Ophioglossaceae
- Genus: Botrychium
- Species: B. montanum

Binomial name
- Botrychium montanum W.H.Wagner

= Botrychium montanum =

North American species of moonwort

Botrychium montanum is a species of fern in the family Ophioglossaceae known by the common names western goblin and mountain moonwort. It is native to western North America from British Columbia to northern California to Montana, where it grows in the dark understory of coniferous forests and other moist wooded areas. This very small plant grows from an underground caudex sending one thin gray-green leaf above the surface of the ground. The leaf is less than 8 centimeters tall and is divided into a sterile and a fertile part. The sterile part of the leaf has irregularly shaped angled leaflets. The fertile part of the leaf is very different in shape, with grapelike clusters of sporangia by which it reproduces.

== Taxonomy ==
Botrychium montanum was first described by Herb Wagner in 1981, based on a specimen collected by him in Lake County, Montana.
