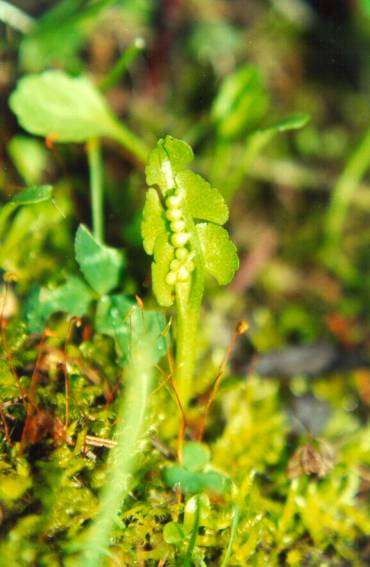

Conservation status
- Vulnerable (NatureServe)

Scientific classification
- Kingdom: Plantae
- Clade: Tracheophytes
- Division: Polypodiophyta
- Class: Polypodiopsida
- Order: Ophioglossales
- Family: Ophioglossaceae
- Genus: Botrychium
- Species: B. crenulatum

Binomial name
- Botrychium crenulatum W.H.Wagner

= Botrychium crenulatum =

North American species of moonwort

Botrychium crenulatum is a species of fern in the family Ophioglossaceae known by the common names scalloped moonwort and dainty moonwort. It is native to North America from British Columbia to California to Wyoming, where it is uncommon throughout most of its range, appearing incidentally at scattered spots on wet meadows in coniferous forests and marshy areas such as swamps. This is very small plant growing from an underground caudex and sending one thin, shiny, yellow-green leaf above the surface of the ground. The leaf is up to about 6 centimeters tall and is divided into a sterile and a fertile part. The sterile part of the leaf has veined, fan-shaped leaflets with wrinkly edges. The fertile part of the leaf is very different in shape, with tiny grapelike clusters of sporangia by which it reproduces.

== Taxonomy ==
Botrychium crenulatum was first described by Herb Wagner in 1981, based on a specimen collected in the San Gabriel Mountains.
