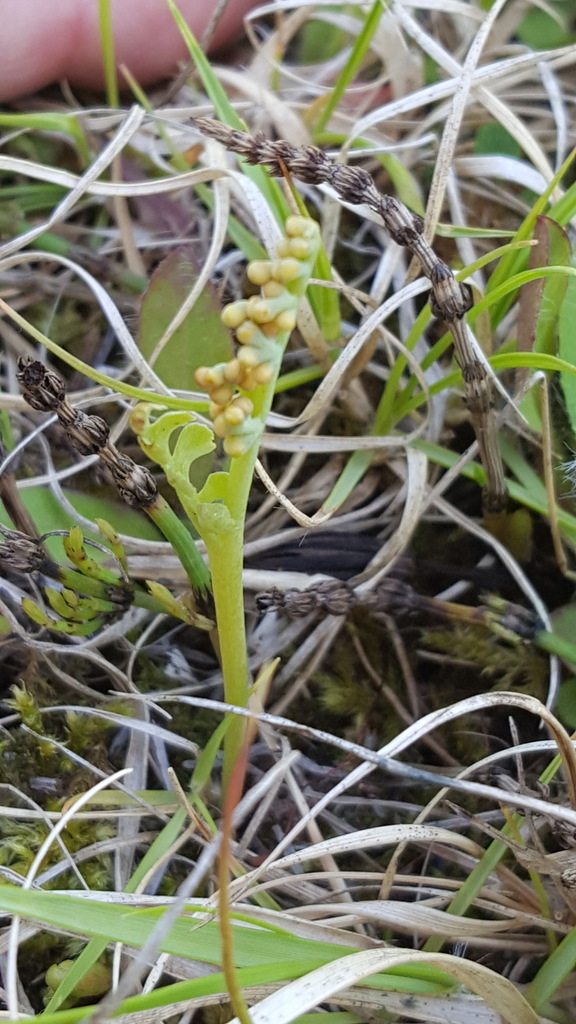

Conservation status
- Vulnerable (NatureServe)

Scientific classification
- Kingdom: Plantae
- Clade: Tracheophytes
- Division: Polypodiophyta
- Class: Polypodiopsida
- Order: Ophioglossales
- Family: Ophioglossaceae
- Genus: Botrychium
- Species: B. pallidum

Binomial name
- Botrychium pallidum W.H.Wagner

= Botrychium pallidum =

Species of fern

Botrychium pallidum, the pale moonwort, is a species of segregate fern in the Ophioglossaceae family. It was originally described from Quebec, collected from a site near Baie-Sainte-Catherine. Prior to its discovery by Warren H. Wagner, it was only known from a herbarium record sheet at the Universite de Laval.

== Taxonomy ==
Botrychium pallidum was first described by Herb Wagner in 1990, based on a specimen collected in 1940 in Baie-Sainte-Catherine, Quebec.

== Description ==
Botrychium pallidum is a small, inconspicuous plant, usually growing to a height of 7 centimetres (2.8 in) or less. It is usually smaller than Botrychium minganense. It has pale leaves that vary from whitish to bluish green; the colour changes to green when moist. Leaves are glaucous and divided into a bladelike trophophore and a fertile sporophore (spore-producing organ).

== Distribution ==
Pale moonwort is found in a variety of habitats both native and disturbed, including former mining sites, burned areas, and open, exposed hillsides. In the state of Colorado, it has been found only in high elevation, subalpine wetlands. After its identification in 1990, it was known from sporadic, small colonies dotted throughout Colorado, Saskatchewan, Michigan, Ontario, and Quebec. By 2006, a new population in Maine was identified by Art Gilman, then president of the New England Botanical Society. A species was reportedly collected in Manitoba in 1959 near Otterburne.
