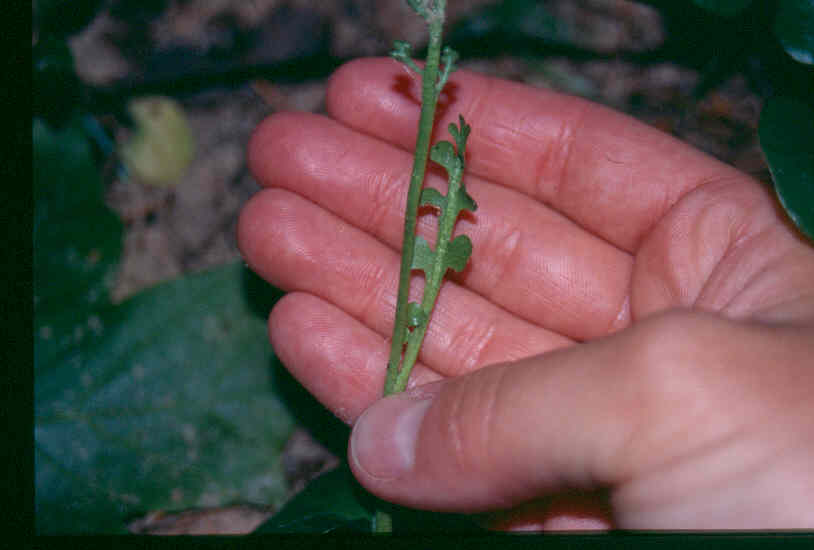

Conservation status
- Secure (NatureServe)

Scientific classification
- Kingdom: Plantae
- Clade: Tracheophytes
- Division: Polypodiophyta
- Class: Polypodiopsida
- Order: Ophioglossales
- Family: Ophioglossaceae
- Genus: Botrychium
- Species: B. minganense

Binomial name
- Botrychium minganense Victorin

Synonyms
- List: Botrychium lunaria f. minganense (Vict.) Clute; Botrychium lunaria subsp. minganense (Vict.) Calder & Roy L.Taylor; Botrychium lunaria var. minganense (Vict.) Dole

= Botrychium minganense =

North American species of moonwort

Botrychium minganense is a species of fern in the family Ophioglossaceae known by the common name Mingan moonwort. It is native to North America from Alaska and northern Canada to Arizona, where it is uncommon throughout most of its range, appearing at scattered spots in coniferous forests and marshy areas such as swamps.

== Description ==
This is very small plant growing from an underground caudex and sending one thin leaf above the surface of the ground. The leaf is up to 10 centimeters tall and is divided into a sterile and a fertile part. The sterile part of the leaf has fan-shaped or spoon-shaped leaflets. The fertile part of the leaf is very different in shape, with grape-like clusters of sporangia by which it reproduces. It is a fern that is between 8 and 25 centimeters tall. It is divided into two parts, the portion which has spores (the sporophore) and the sterile blade (the trophophore). The blade is yellowish-green, clearly stalked, and has up to ten pairs of pinnae (fern leaves). The fern leaves are fan-shaped with entire or shallowly lobed margins and are of similar size and spacing along the rachis. The sporophore is either the same size or larger than the blade at the time of spore release. It can commonly be mistaken for Botrychium neolunaria (New World moonwort), Botrychium pallidum (pale moonwort), or Botrychium spathulatum (spatulate moonwort). The bloom period is between the months of July to September. It can be found between the elevations of 5215 to 10795 feet (or 1590 to 3290 meters).

== Taxonomy ==
Botrychium minganense was first described by Brother Marie-Victorin in 1927, based on material collected with Brother Rolland-Germain in the Mingan Archipelago.

== Distribution and habitat ==
It has a global rank of G5, as it is found across Canada and the United States in small numbers. It has a multitude of local ranks, including, secure in British Columbia, apparently secure in Alberta, the Northwest Territories, Ontario, Quebec, Montana, and Washington State, vulnerable in Newfoundland, Nunavut, California, Colorado, Idaho, Minnesota, Oregon, and Wyoming, imperiled in Manitoba, New Brunswick, Nevada, and Wisconsin, and critically imperiled in Labrador, Saskatchewan, Arizona, New York, North Dakota, and Utah. It also might be possibly extirpated in Nova Scotia and Vermont. It was once found in Iceland.

It is found in the habitats which include, meadows, prairies, woods, sand dunes and riverbanks. In Minnesota, it is most frequently found in mesic hardwood forests. It also has been found in upland cedar forest, aspen-fir forest, wet cliffs (mossy ledges of waterfalls), old openings, and trails. It is associated with other species of Botrychium, Acer saccharum (sugar maple), Tilia americana (basswood), Uvularia grandiflora (large-flowered bellwort), and Aralia nudicaulis (wild sarsaparilla). The habitat conditions can range from sunny to densely shaded and from dry to permanently saturated. Habitats include forests, meadows, fens, and seeps.
