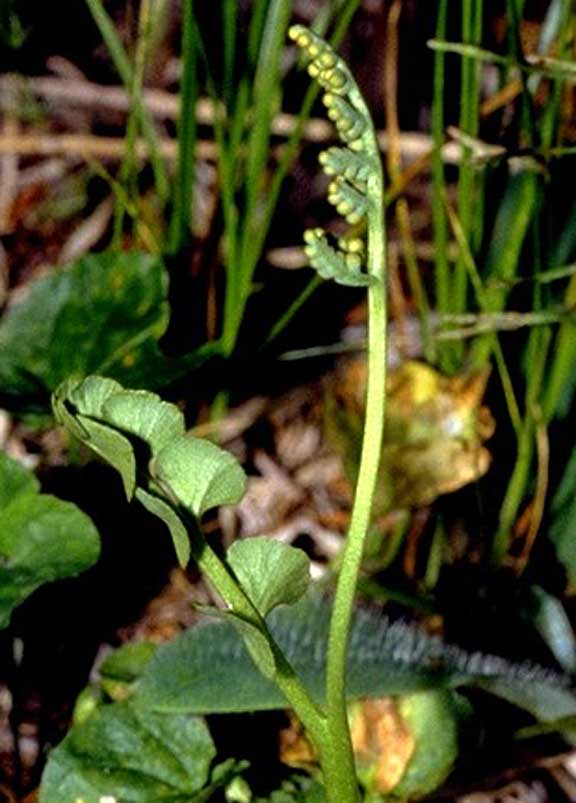
- Botrychium lunaria

Scientific classification
- Kingdom: Plantae
- Clade: Embryophytes
- Clade: Tracheophytes
- Division: Polypodiophyta
- Class: Polypodiopsida
- Order: Ophioglossales
- Family: Ophioglossaceae
- Subfamily: Botrychioideae
- Genus: Botrychium; Sw.

Type species
- Botrychium lunaria (L.) Swartz

Species
- see text

= Botrychium =

Moonwort

Genus of ferns

Botrychium is a genus of ferns, seedless vascular plants in the family Ophioglossaceae. Botrychium species are known as moonworts. They are small, with fleshy roots, and reproduce by spores shed into the air. One part of the leaf, the trophophore, is sterile and fernlike; the other, the sporophore, is fertile and carries the clusters of sporangia or spore cases. Some species only occasionally emerge above ground and gain most of their nourishment from an association with mycorrhizal fungi.

== Taxonomy ==
The Smith et al. classification of 2006, based on molecular phylogeny, placed Botrychium in Ophioglossaceae. Subsequent classifications have maintained this placement. Circumscriptions of the genus vary. The Christenhusz and Chase classification of 2014 recognizes a broadly circumscribed Botrychium. This circumscription corresponds to subfamily Botrychioideae in the PPG I classification, which recognizes Botrypus, Japanobotrychum, and Sceptridium as separate genera.

== Phylogeny ==
Phylogeny of Botrychium

- - section Lanceolatae
    - B. matricariifolium (Döll) Braun ex Koch 1847 (daisy-leaved/ matricary/chamomile moonwort/grapefern)
    - - B. pedunculosum Wagner 1986 (stalked moonwort)
      - - - B. hesperium Maxon & Clausen) Wagner & Lellinger 1981 (western moonwort)
          - B. pseudopinnatum Wagner 1990 (false northwestern/ daisy-leaved grapefern)
        - - - B. acuminatum W.H.Wagner 1990 (pointed moonwort)
            - B. pinnatum H. St.John (northern moonwort)
          - - B. alaskense Wagner & Grant 2002 (Alaska moonwort)
            - - B. boreale Milde 1857 (northern moonwort)
              - B. lanceolatum (Gmel) Ångstr. 1854 (triangle moonwort, lance-leaved grapefern)
  - section Botrychium
    - - B. echo Wagner 1983 (reflected grapfern)
      - B. michiganense Wagner ex Gilman, Farrar & Zika 2015 (Michigan moonwort)
    - - - - B. pumicola Coville ex Underw. 1900 (pumice moonwort/grape-fern)
          - - B. furculatum Popovich & Farrar 2020
            - B. ×watertonense Wagner (Waterton grapefern)
        - - B. dusenii (Christ 1906) Alston 1960
          - - B. tunux Stensvold & Farrar 2002 (moosewort)
            - - B. lunaria (L.) Sw. 1801 (common moonwort, grapefern moonwort)
              - - B. neolunaria sp. nov. ined. Stensvold & Farrar 2008 (common moonwort)
                - - B. nordicum Stensvold & Farrar 2016
                  - - B. crenulatum W.H.Wagner 1981 (dainty/crenulate moonwort)
                    - B. yaaxudakeit Stensvold & Farrar 2002 (giant/Yakutat moonwort)
      - - B. minganense Vict. 1927 (Mingan's moonwort)
        - - - B. campestre Wagner & Farrar (prairie moonwort/ dunewort, Iowa moonwort)
            - - B. gallicomontanum Farrar & Johnson-Groh 1991 (Frenchman's Bluff moonwort)
              - B. pallidum Wagner 1990 (Pale moonwort)
          - - - B. ascendens W.H.Wagner 1986 (upswept/triangle-lobed/upward-lobed moonwort)
              - B. simplex E.Hitchc. 1823 (least moonwort/grapefern, little grapefern)
            - - B. lineare Wagner 1994 (skinny moonwort, narrowleaf grapefern)
              - - B. paradoxum Wagner 1981 (paradox/peculiar moonwort)
                - - B. spathulatum Wagner 1990 (spatulate/ spoon-leaved moonwort)
                  - - B. montanum Wagner (western goblin, mountain moonwort)
                    - B. mormo Wagner 1981 (little goblin moonwort)

Unassigned species:

- Botrychium daucifolium Wall. ex Hook. & Grev. 1830 (thin-leaved moonwort)
- Botrychium farrarii Legler & Popovich 2024
- Botrychium onondagense Underw. 1903
- Botrychium rubellum Stensvold & Farrar 2024
- Botrychium socorrense W.H.Wagner 1989 (Isla Socorro moonwort)
- Botrychium sutchuanense Chien & Chun 1959
- †Botrychium ternatopsis Kuzitchkina 1960
- Botrychium tolucaense Wagner & Mickel 2004

== Conservation ==
Moonworts can be found in many environments, including prairies, forests, and mountains. While some Botrychium species are quite rare, conservation efforts can be difficult. Determining the rarity of a species is complicated by the plants' small leaves, which stand only 2–10 centimeters (1–4 inches) above the soil. Even more of a challenge in obtaining an accurate population count is the genus's largely subterranean life cycle. The vast majority of any one population of moonworts actually exists below ground in banks consisting of several types of propagules. One type of propagule is the ungerminated spores, which must percolate through the soil beyond the reach of light in order to germinate. This presumably increases the probability that the spore will be in range of a mycorrhizal symbiont before it produces the tiny, roughly heart-shaped gametophyte, which also exists entirely below ground. Finally, some species produce gemmae, a form of asexual propagation achieved by budding of the root.

Juvenile and dormant sporophytes can also be hidden in the soil for long periods of time. Mature sporophytes do not necessarily produce a leaf annually; they can remain viable underground for up to 10 years without putting up a photosynthetic component. This feat is made possible by their dependence on symbiotic partnership with AM fungi of the genus Glomus, which supply most fixed carbon for growth and reproduction.

This mycorrhizal dependence has also made lab cultivation of moonworts difficult. Thus far, only germination of the gametophyte has been successful.
