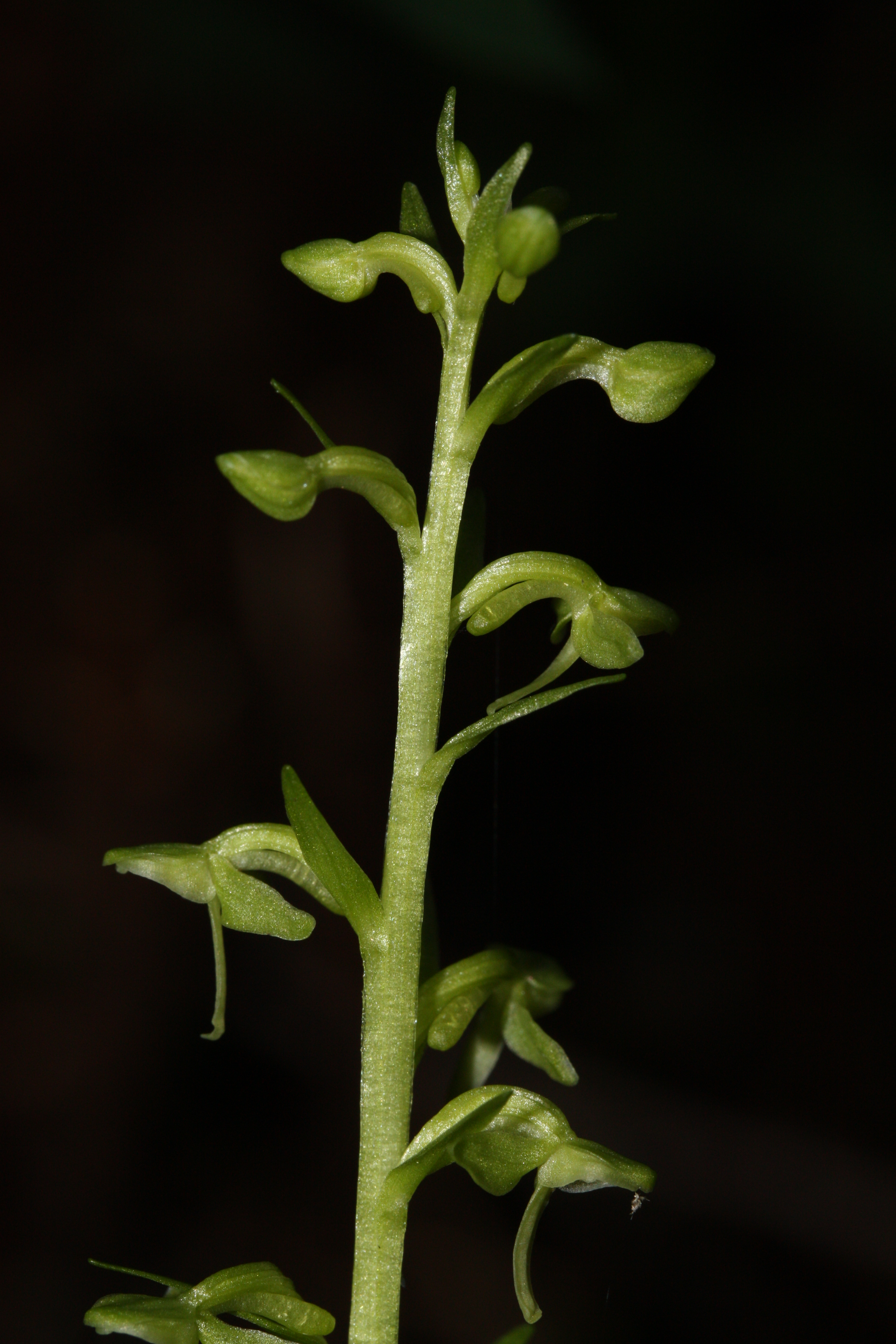

Conservation status
- Secure (NatureServe)
- CITES Appendix II

Scientific classification
- Kingdom: Plantae
- Clade: Embryophytes
- Clade: Tracheophytes
- Clade: Spermatophytes
- Clade: Angiosperms
- Clade: Monocots
- Order: Asparagales
- Family: Orchidaceae
- Subfamily: Orchidoideae
- Genus: Platanthera
- Species: P. stricta

Binomial name
- Platanthera stricta Lindl.

Synonyms
- Habenaria borealis var. viridiflora Cham.; Orchis dolichorhiza Fisch. ex Lindl.; Platanthera gracilis Lindl.; Platanthera dolichorrhiza (Fisch. ex Lindl.) Rchb.f.; Platanthera dilatata var. gracilis Ledeb.; Platanthera dilatata var. viridiflora (Cham.) Ledeb.; Habenaria gracilis (Ledeb.) S.Watson; Habenaria saccata Greene; Habenaria stricta (Lindl.) Rydb.; Platanthera gracilis (Ledeb.) Kraenzl.; Limnorchis stricta (Lindl.) Rydb.; Limnorchis gracilis (Lindl.) Rydb.; Limnorchis viridiflora (Cham.) Rydb.; Platanthera hyperborea var. dilatatoides Hultén; Habenaria neomexicana Tidestr.; Habenaria septentrionalis Tidestr.; Platanthera stricta var. gracilis (Lindl.) Hultén; Platanthera hyperborea var. viridiflora (Cham.) Kitam.; Habenaria convallariifolia var. dilatatoides (Hultén) B.Boivin; Habenaria saccata var. gracilis (Lindl.) B.Boivin; Platanthera saccata (Greene) Hultén; Limnorchis saccata (Greene) Á.Löve & W.Simon; Platanthera hyperborea var. gracilis (Lindl.) Luer

= Platanthera stricta =

Slender bog orchid

Species of orchid

Platanthera stricta is a species of orchid known by the common name slender bog orchid. It is native to western North America from Alaska and Yukon south to Utah and northern California.

Platanthera stricta grows in wet areas, such as shady forest meadows. It produces a slender, erect flowering stem up to about 80 centimetres (31 in) tall. The longest leaves near the base of the stem are up to 11 centimetres (4 1/3 in) long by 2.5 centimetres (1 in) wide. The inflorescence has widely spaced green flowers, sometimes tinged red or purple. The sepals and petals are around one-half centimetre (1/4 in) long and each flower has a club-shaped spur.
