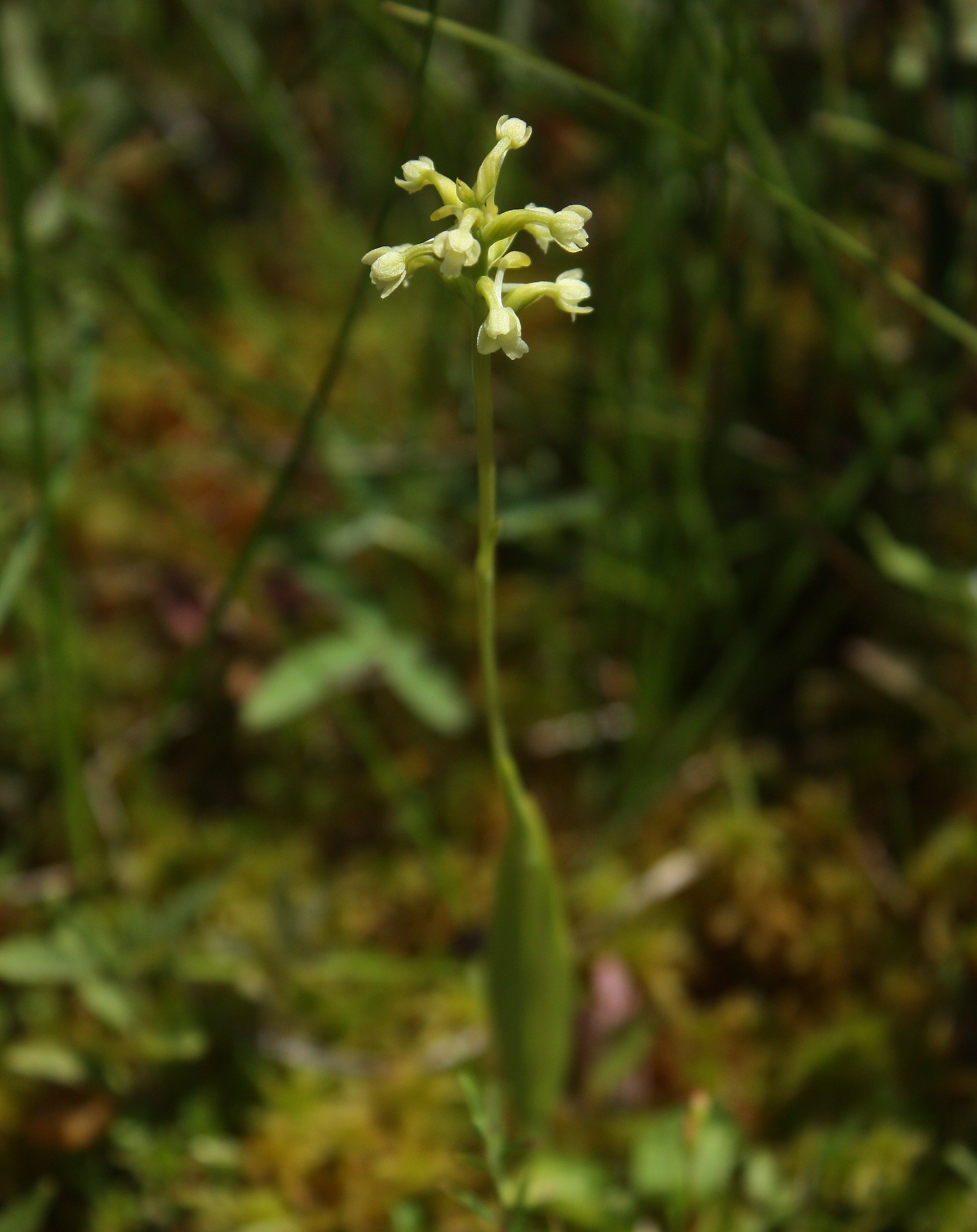
- Platanthera clavellata

Scientific classification
- Kingdom: Plantae
- Clade: Tracheophytes
- Clade: Angiosperms
- Clade: Monocots
- Order: Asparagales
- Family: Orchidaceae
- Subfamily: Orchidoideae
- Genus: Platanthera
- Species: P. clavellata

Binomial name
- Platanthera clavellata (Michx.) Luer
- Occurrences recorded by GBIF

= Platanthera clavellata =

Club-spur orchid

Species of orchid

Platanthera clavellata, commonly known as the club-spur orchid or small green wood orchid, is a terrestrial orchid of North America.

== Description ==
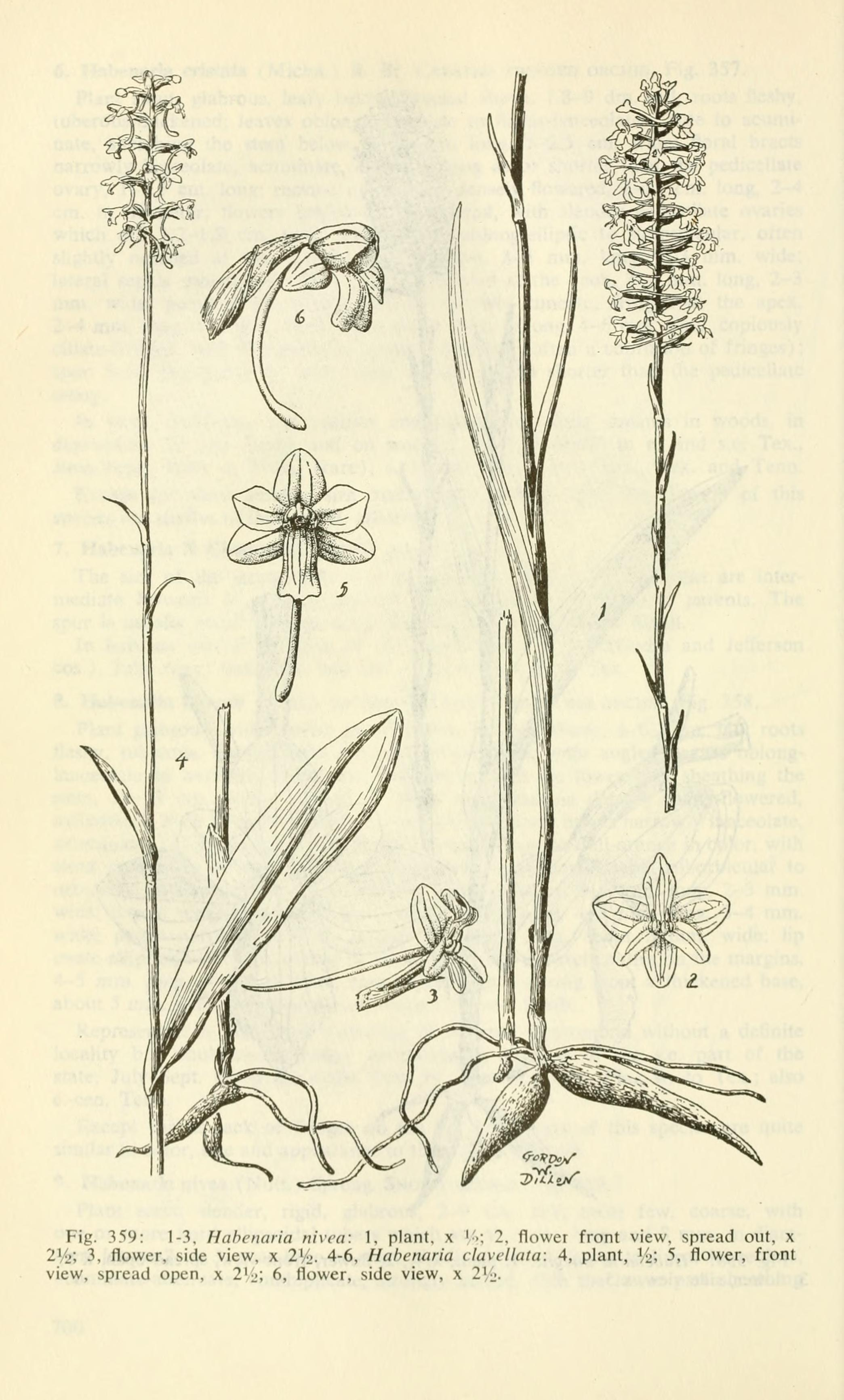
Illustration of Platanthera clavellata (left, numbered 4/5/6) and Platanthera nivea (right)

Platanthera clavellata plants are 4-16" tall. It is one of the smallest species out of the 32 species of Platanthera common in North America. The stem has several linear-oblong to narrowly elliptic or oblanceolate leaves attached, of which all but the bottom-most one are greatly reduced in size. They range from 7–16 cm long, and are up to 3 cm wide. There are no branches and the stem terminates in a raceme of 5-20 flowers. The flowers are small and inconspicuous and consist of 3 petals and 3 sepals which look like petals. The petals/sepals are greenish to white or yellowish. The upper two petals and upper sepal form a hood and the two lateral sepals are bent forward like two small wings. The lower petal is longer and forms a lip at the front and a nectar spur at the back. The curved nectar spur ranges from 7-12 mm and is enlarged at the tip. Seed capsules are 6 to 10 mm long and rise at an angle.

Bloom time is mid to late summer, and peaks during the last two weeks of July.

== Distribution and habitat ==
The plant will grow in moist and acidic soil and requires partial shade. It can grow in areas like moist meadows, bogs, swamps or forested seeps. Its spread is further limited as seeds cannot germinate by themselves and instead require a specific soil fungus to be present. One known soil fungus that associates with P. clavellata is Epulorhiza inquilina.

It can be found in the eastern United States and in Canada. In the United States it has historically been recorded in 34 states, from North Dakota to Minnesota to Maine and down to Florida and Texas. It is considered extirpated in North Dakota however and endangered in Illinois and Florida. In Canada it has been recorded in 6 states, from Newfoundland to Ontario.

== Taxonomy ==
Platanthera clavellata was first described by André Michaux in 1803 (as Orchis clavellata).

== Ecology ==
The flowers of Platanthera clavellata are autogamous and do not require pollinators - instead each flower will pollinate itself to produce viable seeds.
