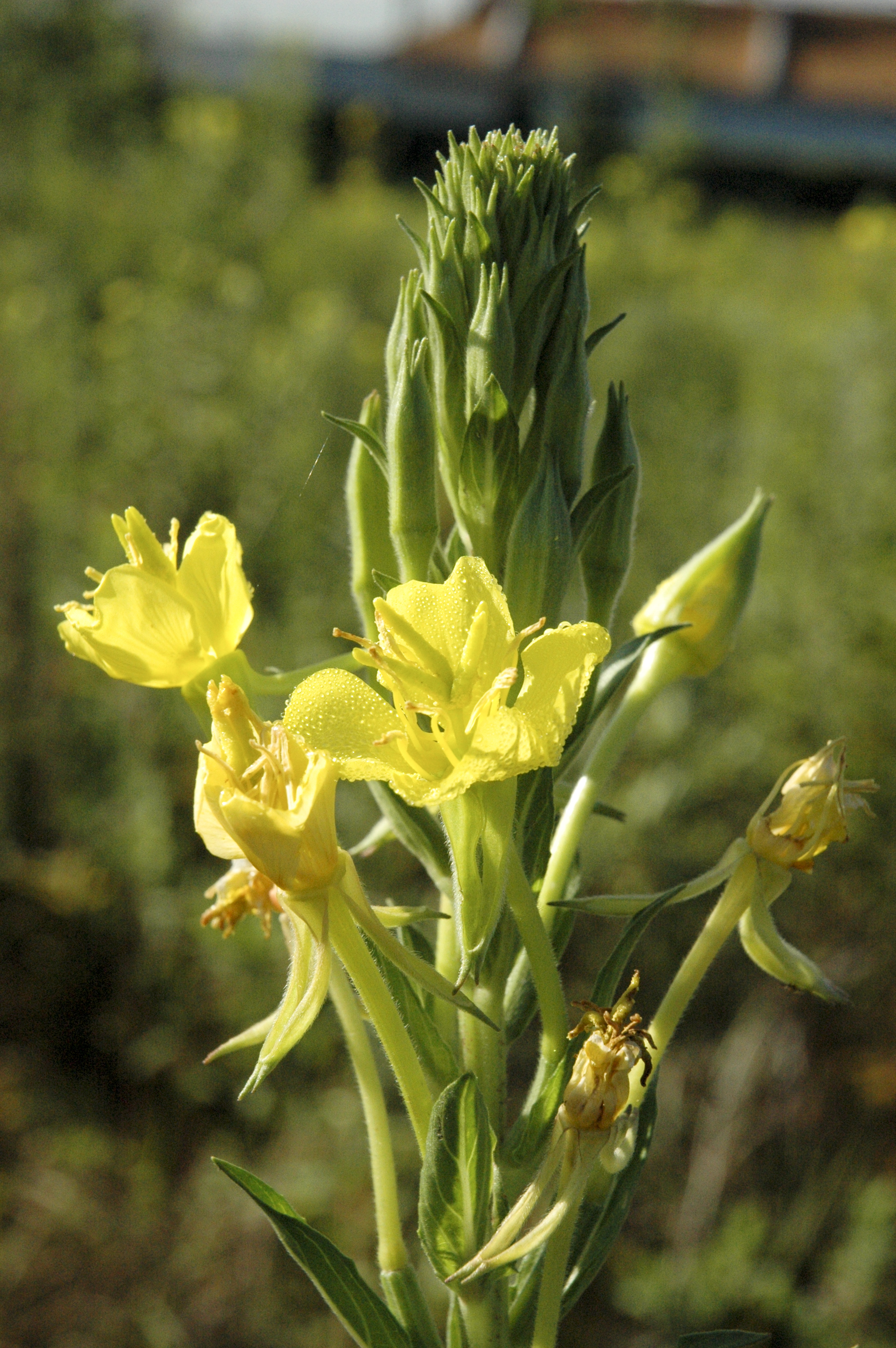

Scientific classification
- Kingdom: Plantae
- Clade: Embryophytes
- Clade: Tracheophytes
- Clade: Angiosperms
- Clade: Eudicots
- Clade: Rosids
- Order: Myrtales
- Family: Onagraceae
- Genus: Oenothera
- Species: O. parviflora

Binomial name
- Oenothera parviflora L.

= Oenothera parviflora =

Species of flowering plant

Oenothera parviflora, the northern evening primrose, is a species of flowering plant in the family Onagraceae. It is native to northeastern North America, and invasive in Europe, Asia, South Africa and New Zealand.

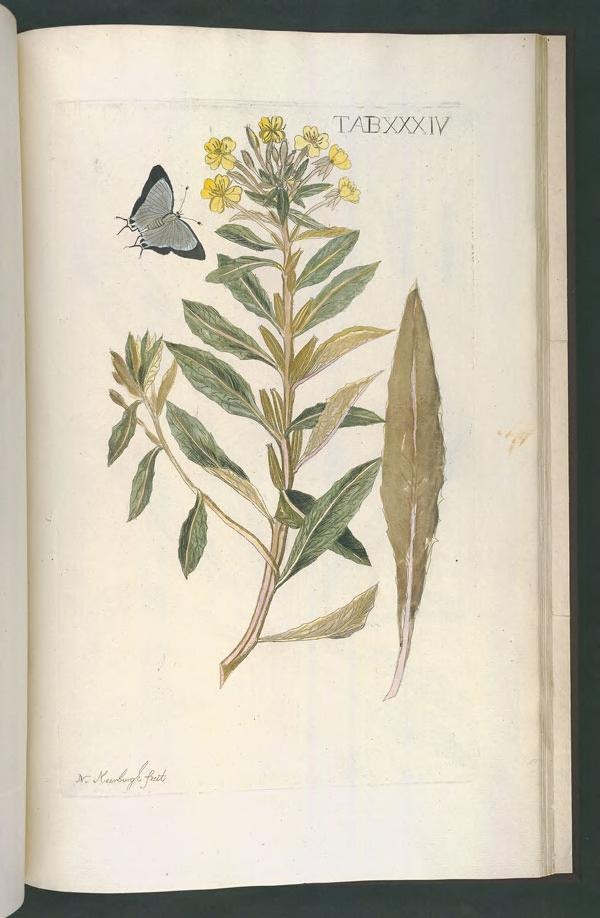
Illustration of O. parviflora.
