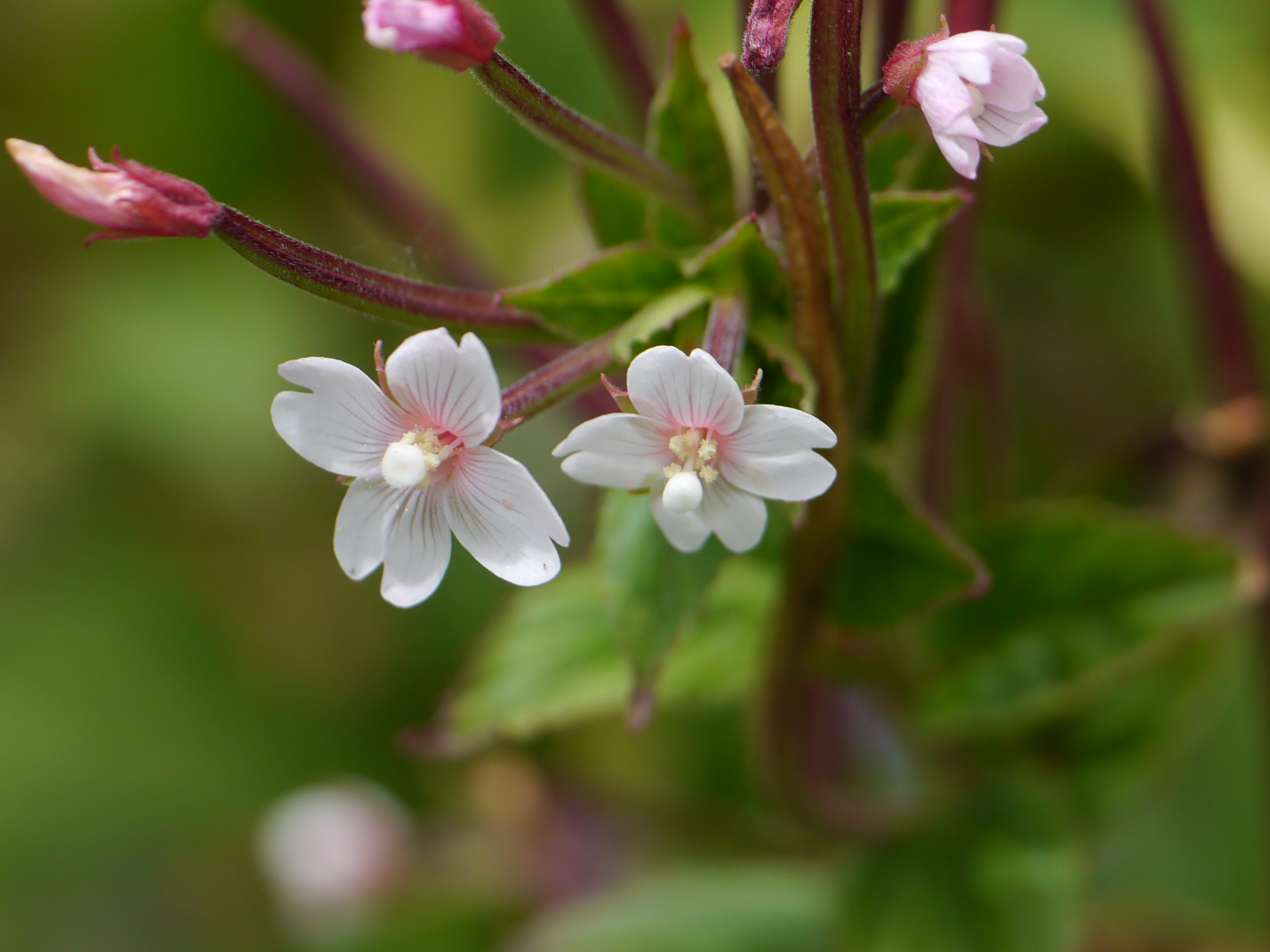

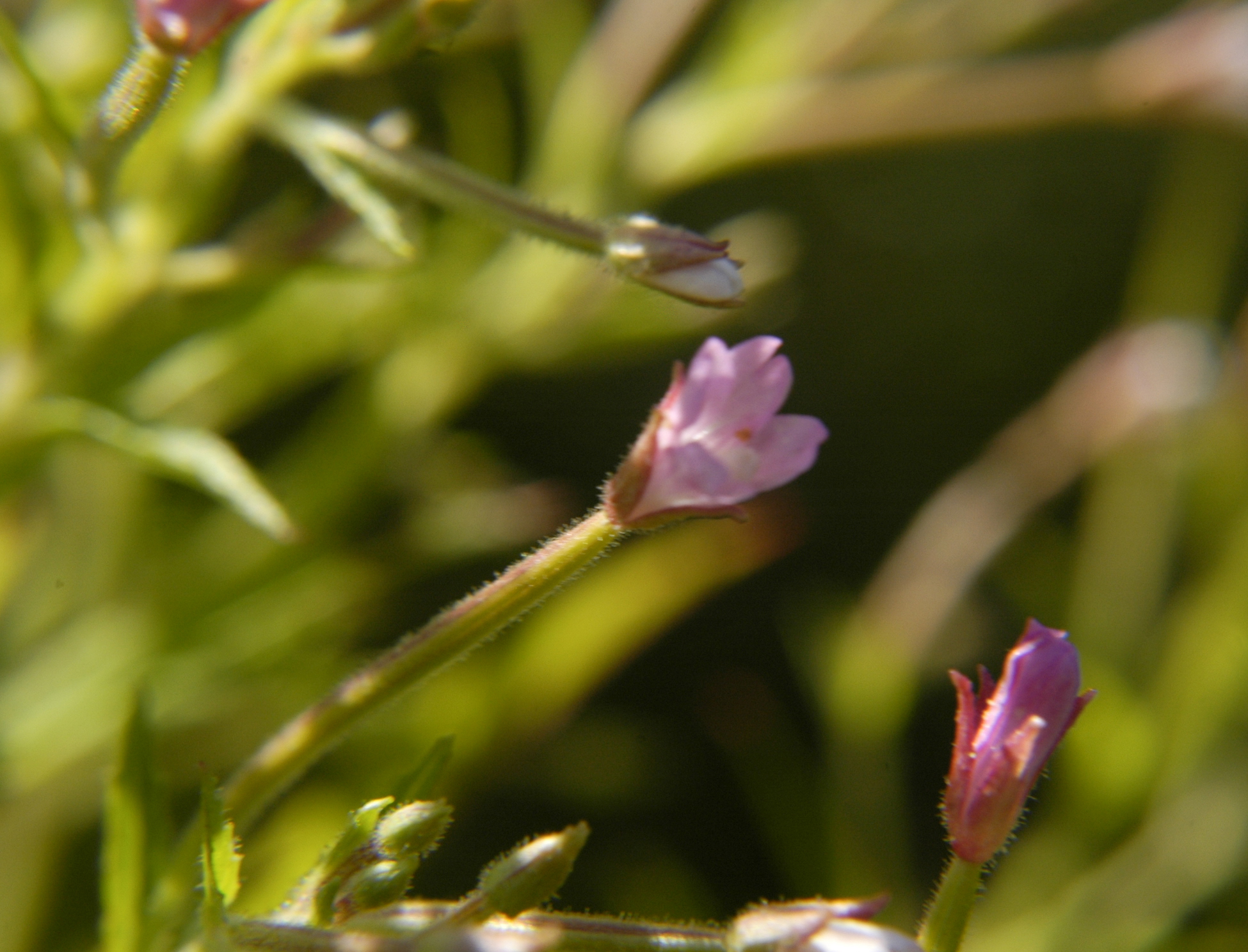

Conservation status
- Least Concern (IUCN 3.1)

- Secure (NatureServe)

Scientific classification
- Kingdom: Plantae
- Clade: Embryophytes
- Clade: Tracheophytes
- Clade: Spermatophytes
- Clade: Angiosperms
- Clade: Eudicots
- Clade: Rosids
- Order: Myrtales
- Family: Onagraceae
- Genus: Epilobium
- Species: E. coloratum

Binomial name
- Epilobium coloratum Biehler

Synonyms
- Epilobium coloratum f. albiflorum Cockerell; Epilobium coloratum f. minus Hausskn.; Epilobium coloratum f. umbrosum Hausskn.; Epilobium divaricatum Raf.; Epilobium domingense Urb.

= Epilobium coloratum =

Species of flowering plant native to North America

Epilobium coloratum, known by the common names purpleleaf willowherb and cinnamon willow-herb, is a species of flowering plant in the genus Epilobium of the willowherb family Onagraceae. This species is native to the Midwest and Eastern United States (excluding Mississippi and Florida), as well as the Canadian provinces of Ontario, Québec, New Brunswick, Nova Scotia, and Newfoundland. It is also native to the Dominican Republic and Haiti.

== Description ==
Epilobium coloratum is a perennial, herbaceous plant that can reach 1.2 meters (4 feet) in height. Small flowers with 4 notched petals of white or light pink rest each at the end of a single short stalk and generally bloom August to October. Leaves are simple and opposite in arrangement with two leaves per node along the stem.

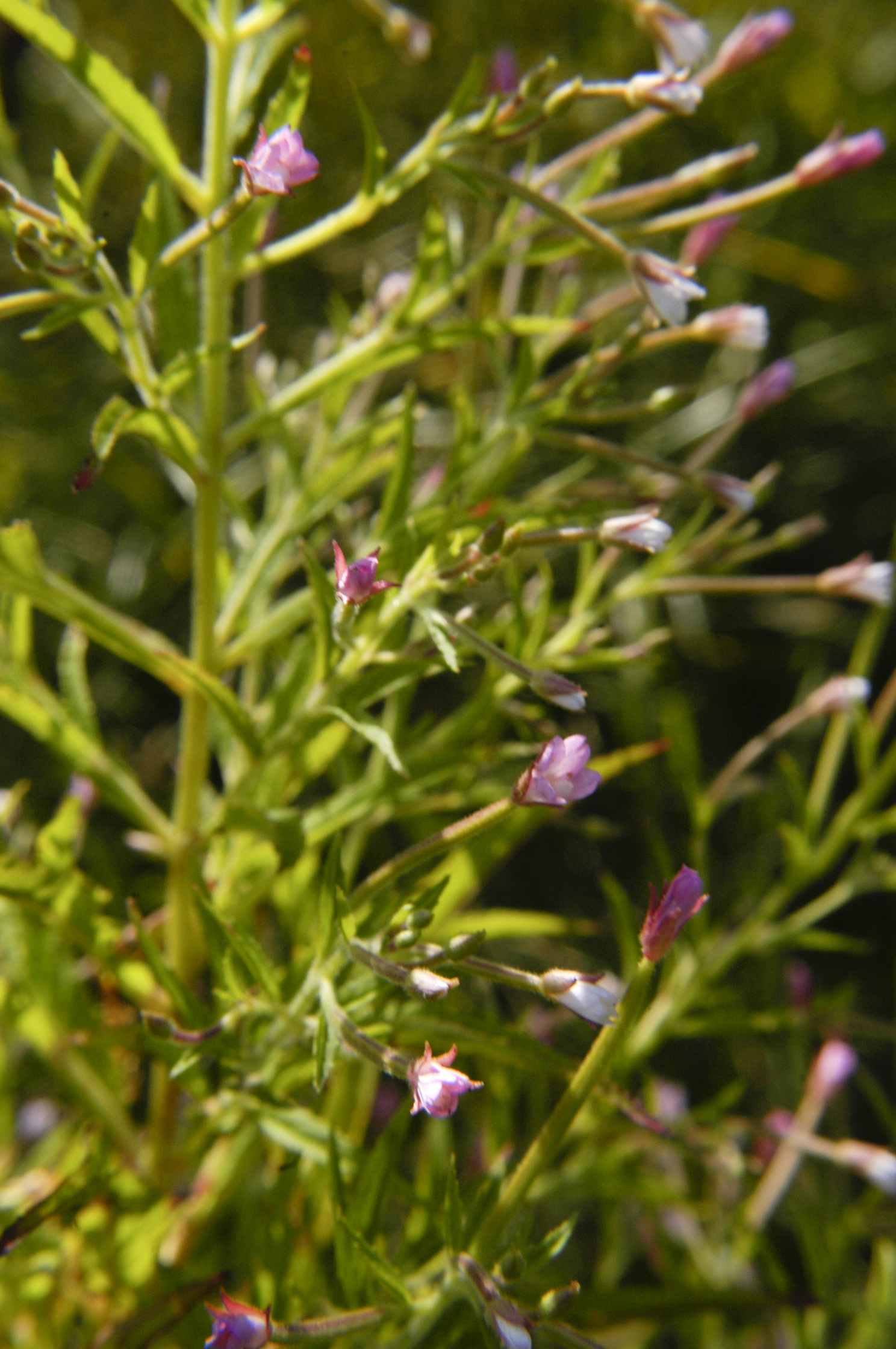

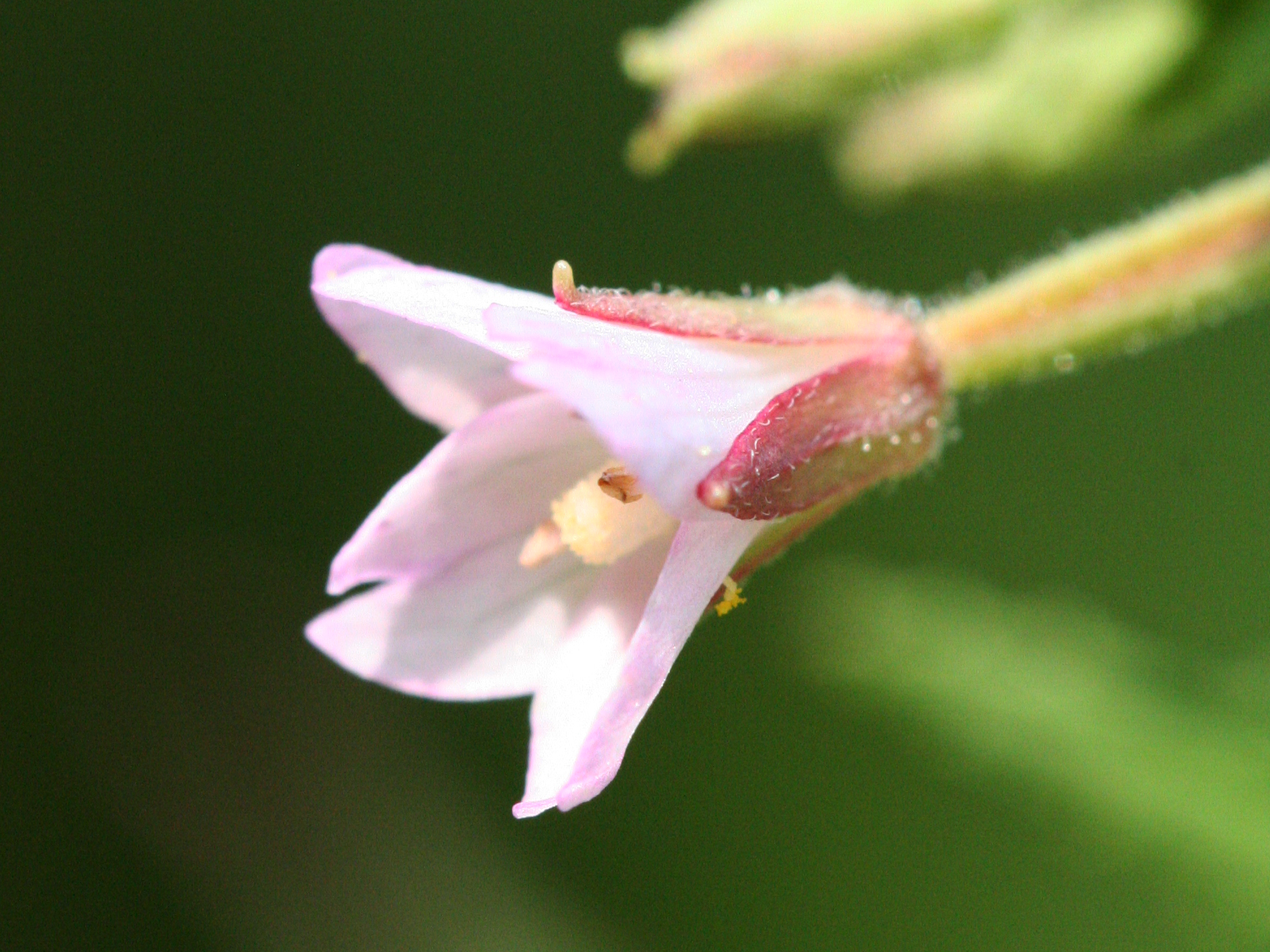

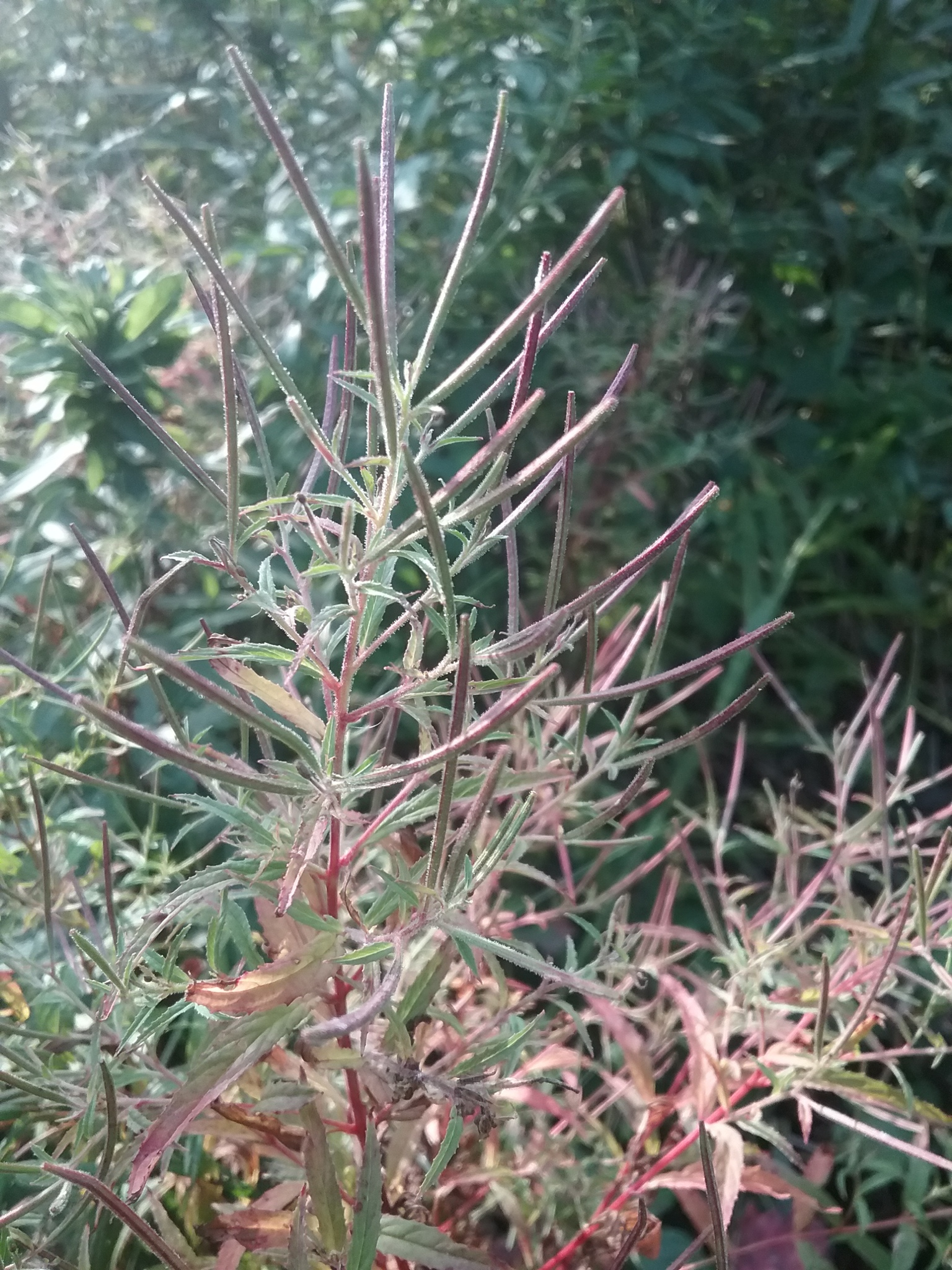

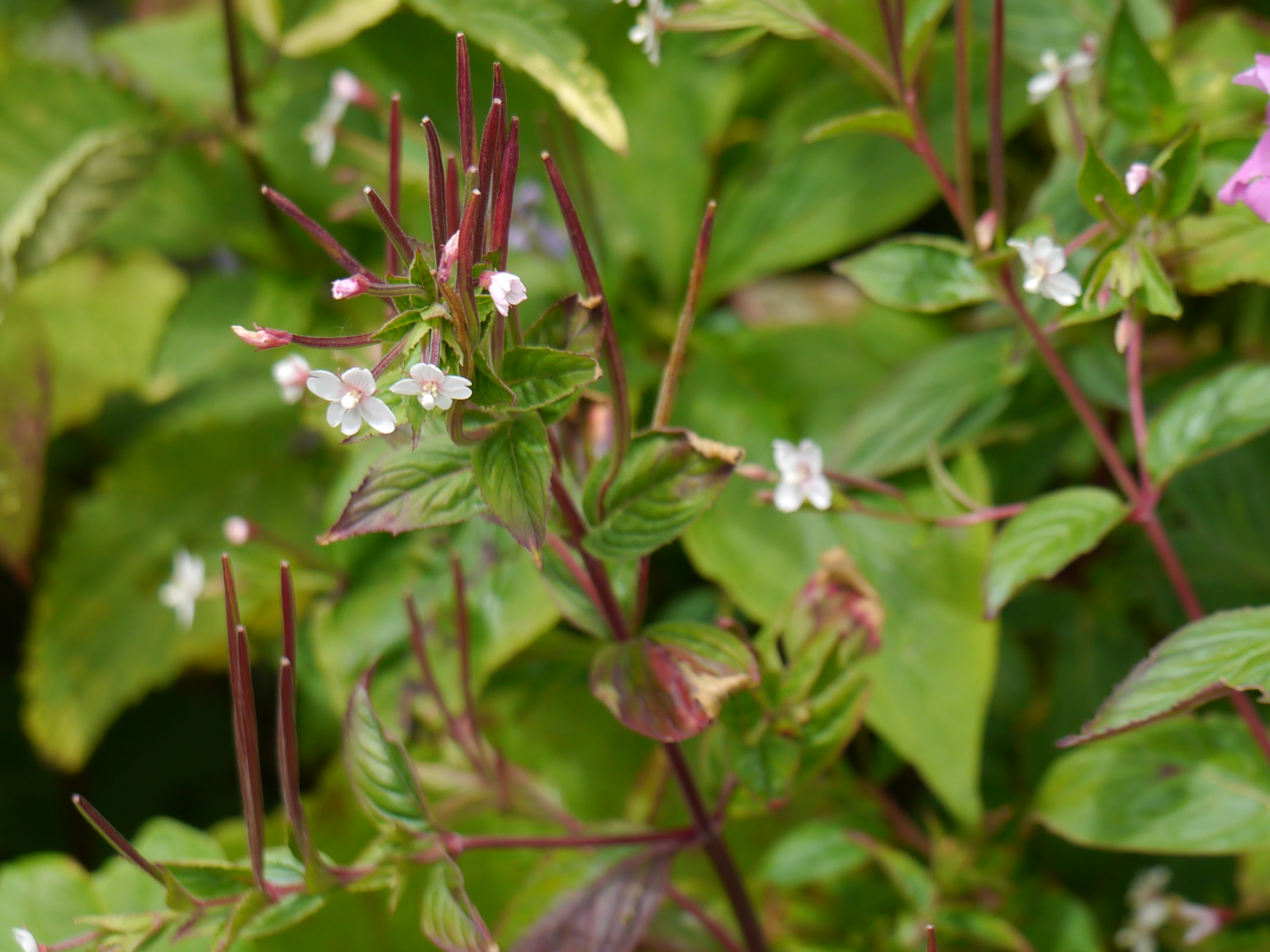

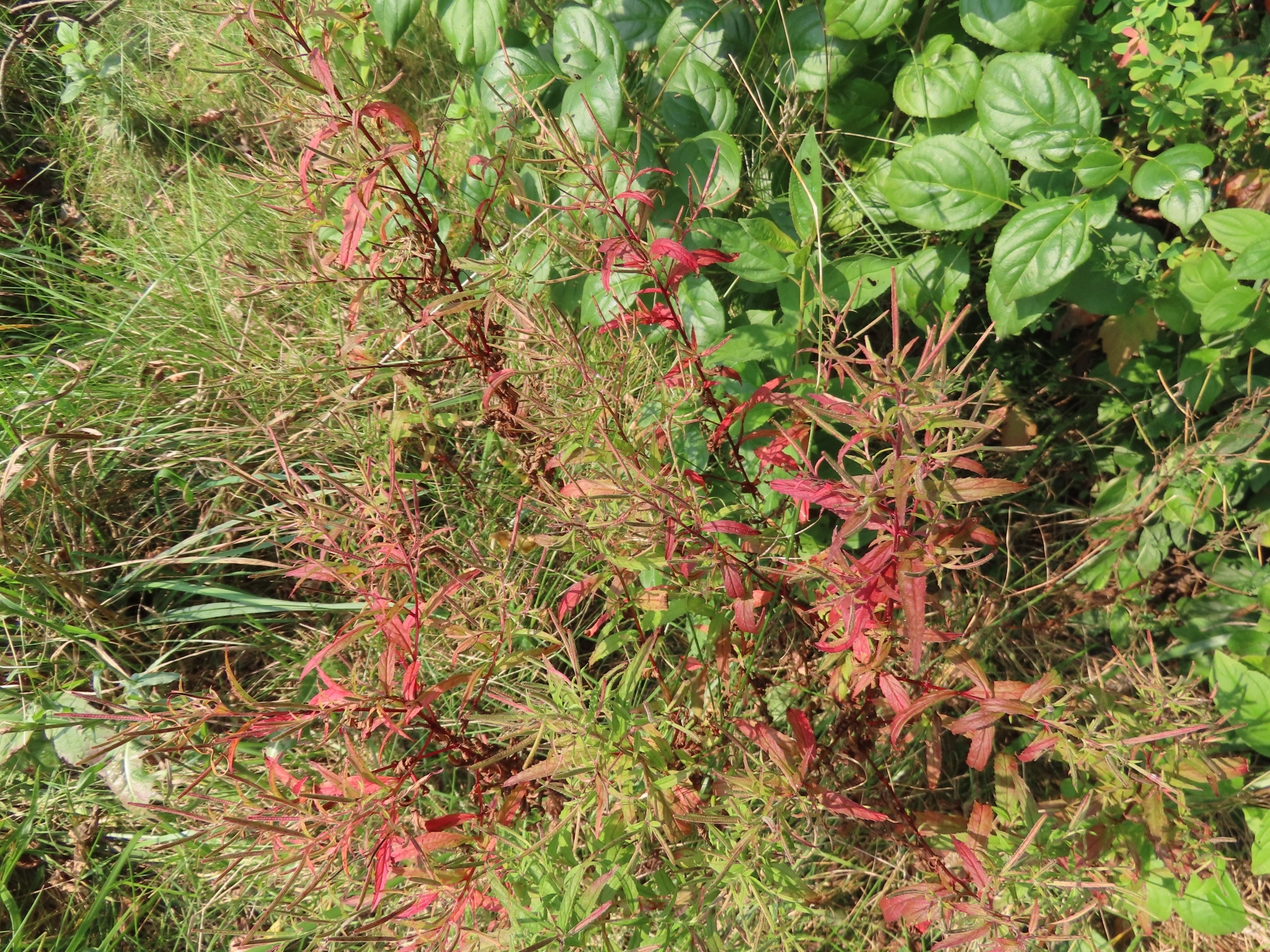

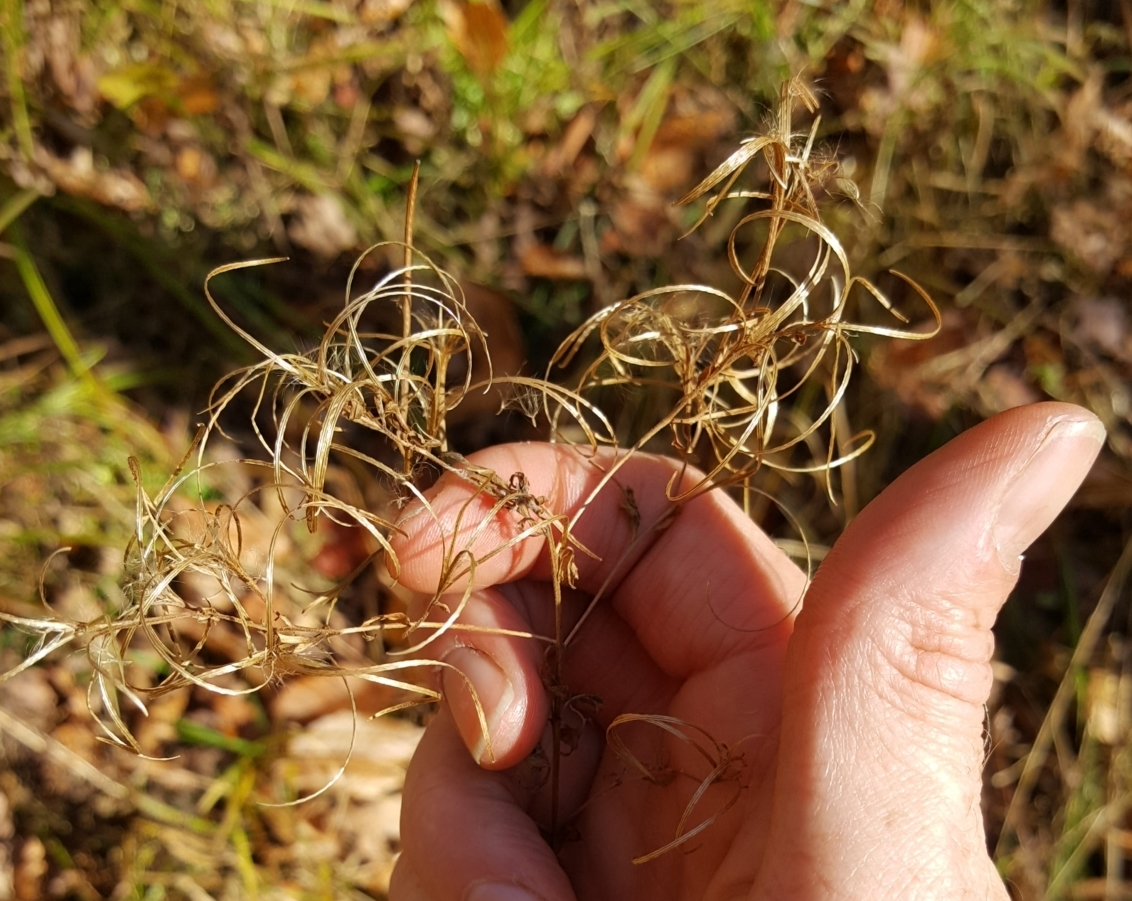

== Distribution and habitat ==
Epilobium coloratum is native to and present in the Midwest and Eastern United States (excluding Mississippi and Florida), as well as the Canadian provinces of Ontario, Québec, New Brunswick, Nova Scotia, and Newfoundland. It is also native to the Dominican Republic and Haiti.

Habitats include poorly-drained prairies; moist, wooded areas; bogs; marshes; and, edges of rivers and ponds. Occasional flooding is tolerated.

== Conservation ==
Epilobium coloratum is classified as LC (Least Concern) on the IUCN Red List. NatureServe lists it as Secure (G5) worldwide and Critically Imperiled (S1) in Alabama, Oklahoma, Newfoundland, and Prince Edward Island; Imperiled (S2) in New Brunswick and Nova Scotia; and, Vulnerable (S3) in North Carolina, North Dakota, and Québec.
