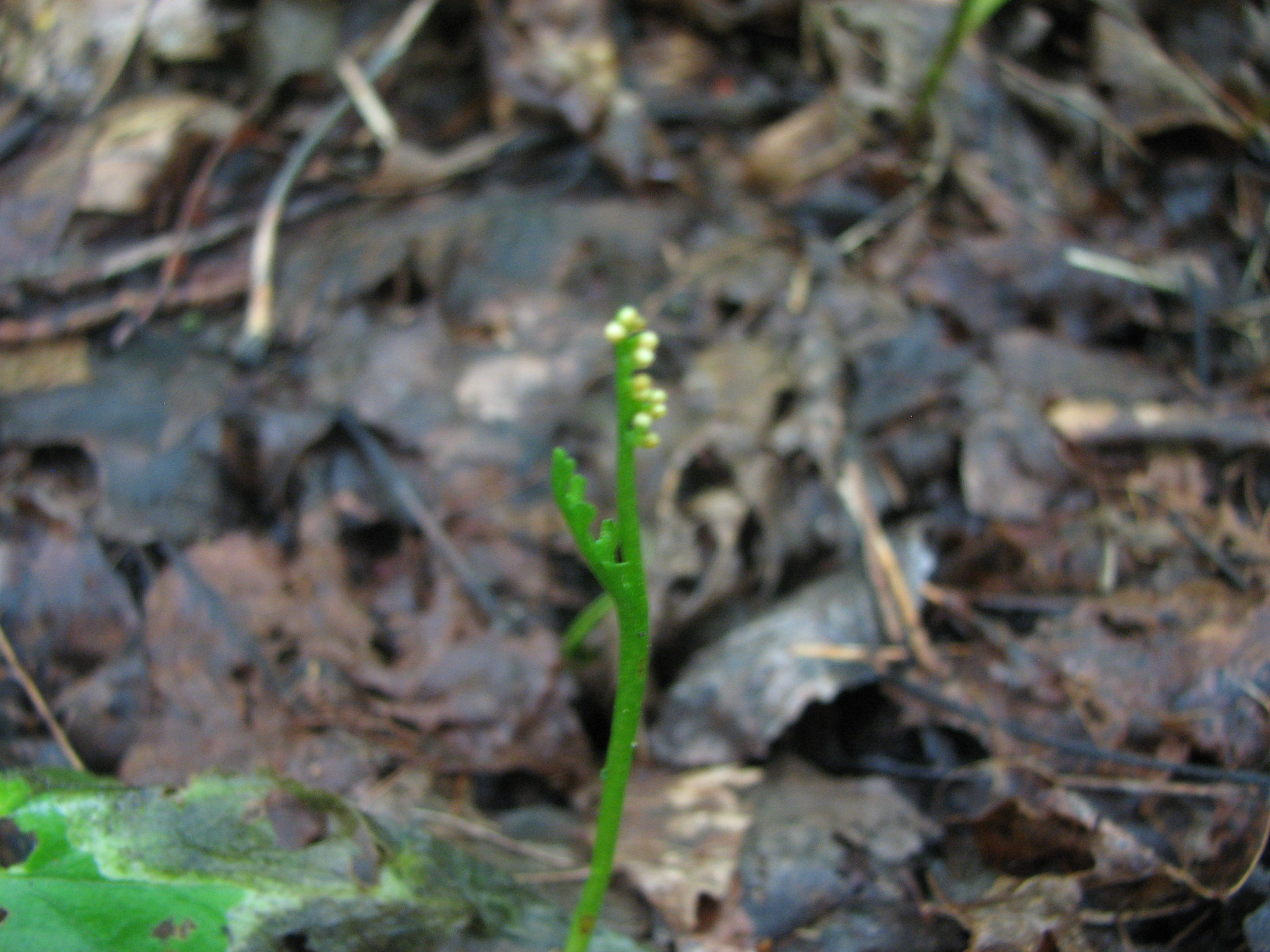
- Sporophore and trophophore of B. ascendens at its one station in Vermont.

Conservation status
- Vulnerable (NatureServe)

Scientific classification
- Kingdom: Plantae
- Clade: Embryophytes
- Clade: Tracheophytes
- Division: Polypodiophyta
- Class: Polypodiopsida
- Order: Ophioglossales
- Family: Ophioglossaceae
- Genus: Botrychium
- Species: B. ascendens

Binomial name
- Botrychium ascendens W.H.Wagner

= Botrychium ascendens =

Upswept moonwort

North American species of moonwort

Botrychium ascendens is a species of fern in the family Ophioglossaceae known by the common names triangle-lobe moonwort and upswept moonwort. It is native to North America from British Columbia to northern California as well as parts of eastern Canada. It lives in different habitat types, including grassy riverside areas. This is very small plant growing from an underground caudex and sending one yellow-green leaf above the surface of the ground. The leaf is up to 6 centimeters tall and is divided into a sterile and a fertile part. The sterile part of the leaf has fan-shaped or wedge-shaped leaflets. The fertile part of the leaf is very different in shape, with tiny grapelike clusters of sporangia by which it reproduces.

== Taxonomy ==
Botrychium ascendens was first described by Herb Wagner in 1986, based on a specimen collected by him in Wallowa County, Oregon.
