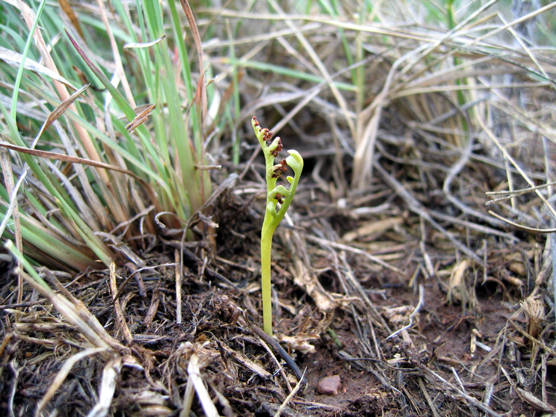

Conservation status
- Vulnerable (NatureServe)

Scientific classification
- Kingdom: Plantae
- Clade: Tracheophytes
- Division: Polypodiophyta
- Class: Polypodiopsida
- Order: Ophioglossales
- Family: Ophioglossaceae
- Genus: Botrychium
- Species: B. campestre

Binomial name
- Botrychium campestre W.H. Wagner & Farrar

= Botrychium campestre =

North American species of moonwort

Botrychium campestre is a fern species in Ophioglossaceae, commonly called prairiemoonwort, prairie dunewort, Iowa moonwort, or plains grapefern. It was first discovered in 1982 and described a few years later.

== Description ==
Botrychium campestre is a small herbaceous perennial plant growing 5 to 10 cm tall; producing a fleshy textured single leaf (frond). Plants arise from a cluster of fleshy roots that have gemmae or gemma-like structures. The top of the leaf is the fertile spore-bearing portion and the lower part is the sterile photosynthetic portion, which is pinnately compound with typically five paired, broad pinnae. Plants produce the above-ground frond in May and June and go dormant in early summer.

== Taxonomy ==
Botrychium campestre was first described by Herb Wagner and Don Farrar in 1986, based on a specimen collected by Wagner in Plymouth County, Iowa.

== Habitat ==
Botrychium campestre is found growing in dry prairies, and perched dunes. Until its discovery in 1982 it was not generally known that Botrychium spp. (moonworts) occurred in prairies. The dominant species found along with this fern include clump-forming grasses such as Schizachyrium scoparium var. scoparium (little bluestem), Andropogon gerardii (big bluestem), and Bouteloua curtipendula var. curtipendula (side oats gramma).

== Distribution ==
Botrychium campestre is endemic to the upper great lakes region of the United States and western Iowa, and western Minnesota, ranging into Nebraska, North Dakota, Saskatchewan, and Manitoba, with isolated disjunct occurrences known in New York and eastern Canada. It is listed as an endangered species in Saskatchewan Canada, where it is found growing in mixed grasslands on stabilized sand dune meadows and above prairie sloughs.
