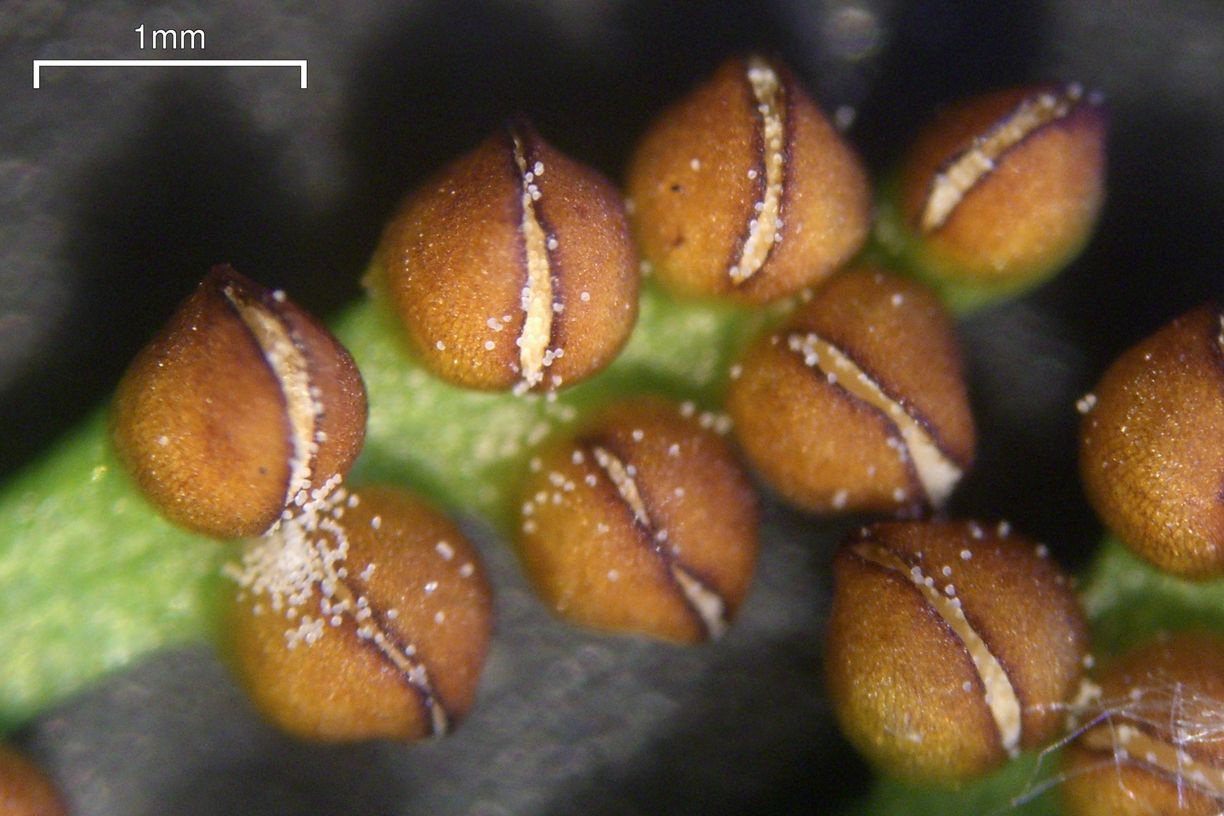
- Sporulation

Conservation status
- Secure (NatureServe)

Scientific classification
- Kingdom: Plantae
- Clade: Tracheophytes
- Division: Polypodiophyta
- Class: Polypodiopsida
- Order: Ophioglossales
- Family: Ophioglossaceae
- Genus: Botrychium
- Species: B. pinnatum

Binomial name
- Botrychium pinnatum H.St.John

= Botrychium pinnatum =

North American species of moonwort

Botrychium pinnatum is a species of fern in the family Ophioglossaceae, known by the common name northwestern moonwort. It is native to North America from Alaska to northern Canada to California and Arizona, where it is generally scattered and uncommon, growing in coniferous forests and grassy meadows. This is very small plant growing from an underground caudex and sending one thin, shiny, green leaf above the surface of the ground. The leaf is less than 8 centimeters tall and is divided into a sterile and a fertile part. The flat sterile part of the leaf has oval to widely lance-shaped leaflets. The fertile part of the leaf is very different in shape, with grapelike clusters of sporangia by which it reproduces.

== Taxonomy ==
Botrychium pinnatum was first described by Harold St. John in 1929, based on material collected by Wilhelm Nikolaus Suksdorf in Washington.
