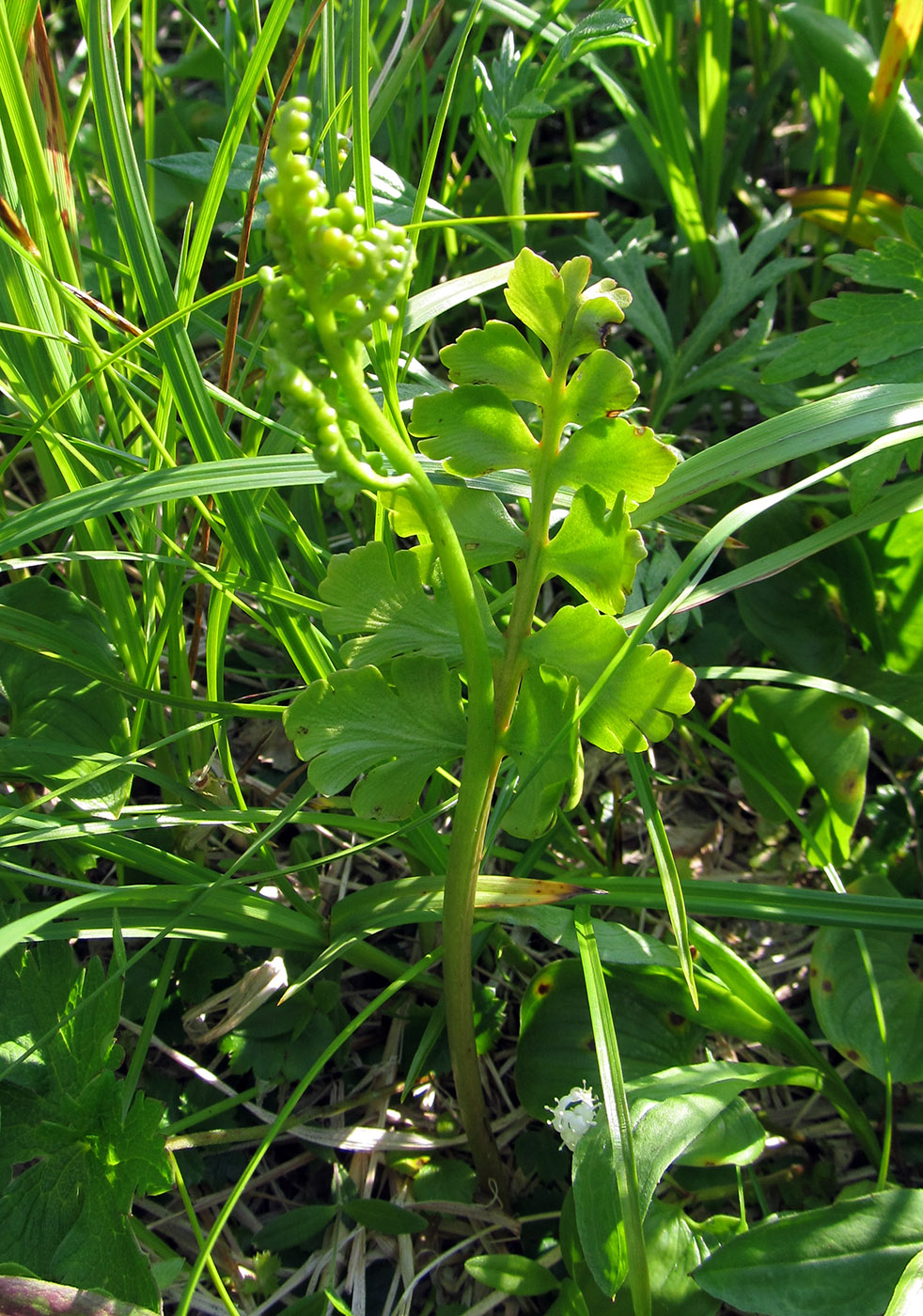

Scientific classification
- Kingdom: Plantae
- Clade: Tracheophytes
- Division: Polypodiophyta
- Class: Polypodiopsida
- Order: Ophioglossales
- Family: Ophioglossaceae
- Genus: Botrychium
- Species: B. boreale

Binomial name
- Botrychium boreale (Fr.) Milde

Synonyms
- Botrychium crassinervium Rupr. 1858

= Botrychium boreale =

Species of fern

Botrychium boreale, commonly called northern moonwort, is a species of fern in the family Ophioglossaceae. It has a short, single leaved rhizome that stands upright.

== Taxonomy ==
Botrychium boreale was first described in 1857 by Julius Milde, based on material from Norway.
