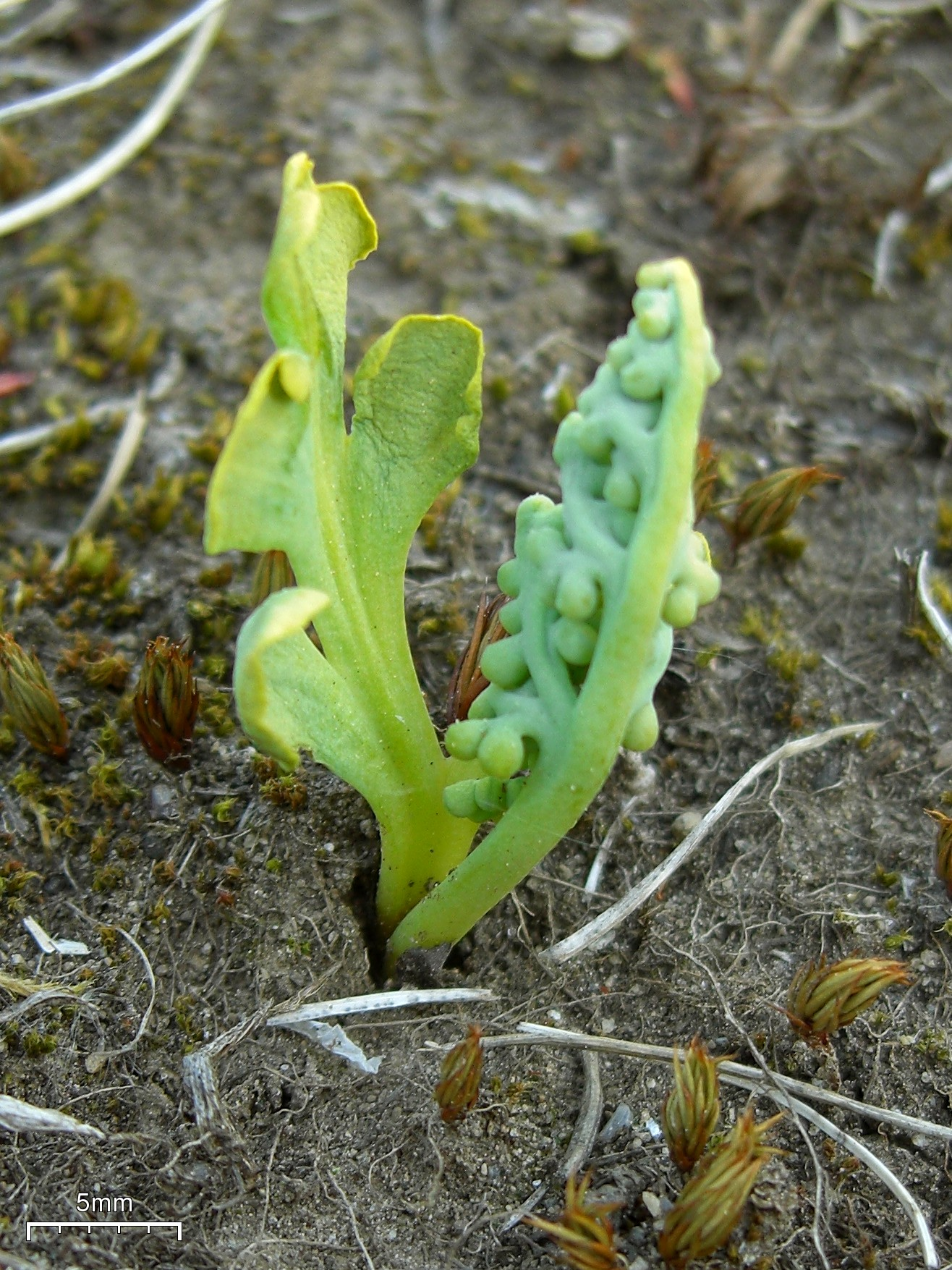

Conservation status
- Secure (NatureServe)

Scientific classification
- Kingdom: Plantae
- Clade: Embryophytes
- Clade: Tracheophytes
- Division: Polypodiophyta
- Class: Polypodiopsida
- Order: Ophioglossales
- Family: Ophioglossaceae
- Genus: Botrychium
- Species: B. simplex

Binomial name
- Botrychium simplex E.Hitchc.

Synonyms
- Botrychium tenebrosum

= Botrychium simplex =

North American species of moonwort

Botrychium simplex, the little grapefern, is a species of fern in the family Ophioglossaceae that is native to North America and Greenland. It is a perennial.

== Taxonomy ==
Botrychium simplex was first described by Edward Hitchcock in 1823, based on material from Conway, Massachusetts.

== Conservation ==
It is listed as a special concern species in Connecticut and is believed extirpated. It is endangered in Illinois, Indiana, and Ohio. It is listed as endangered and extirpated in Maryland, threatened in Iowa, exploitably vulnerable in New York, special concern in Rhode Island, and sensitive in Washington (state).

This species is extremely rare in most European countries. In Ukraine only one place is known.
