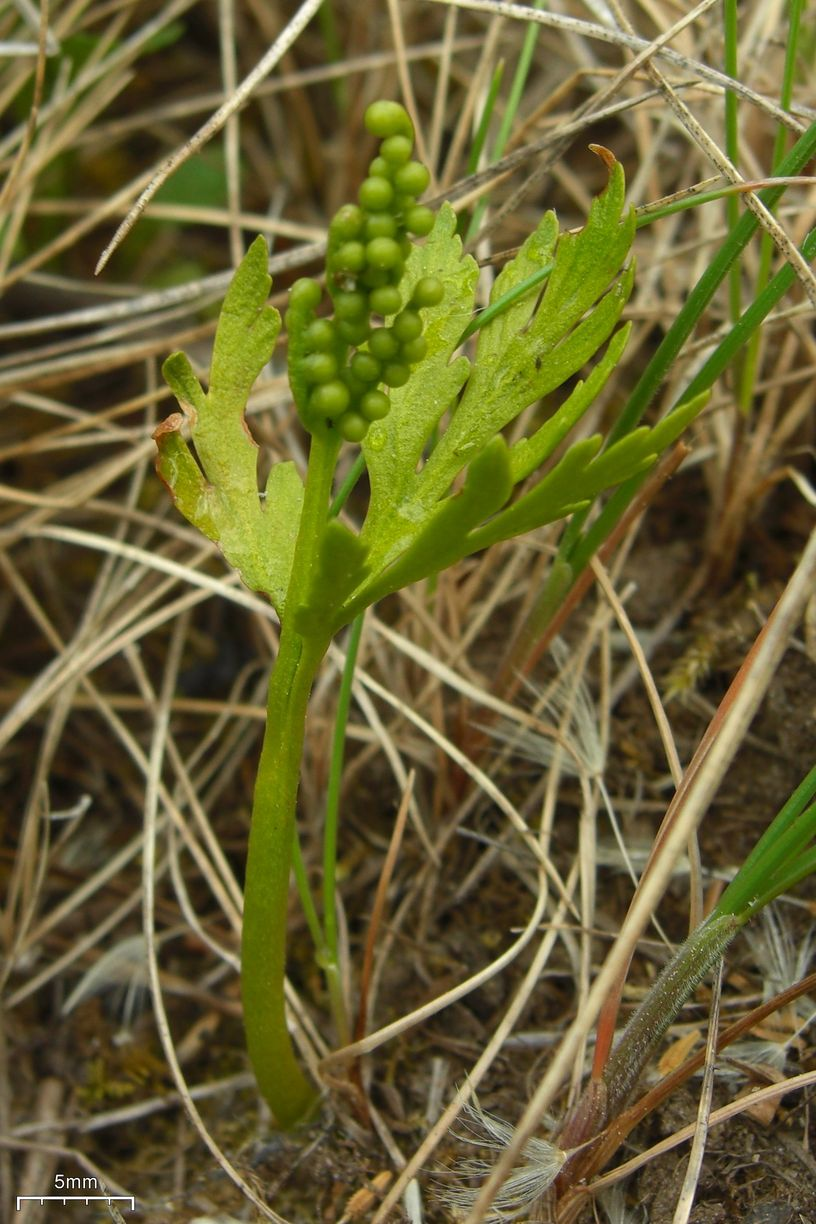

Conservation status
- Secure (NatureServe)

Scientific classification
- Kingdom: Plantae
- Clade: Tracheophytes
- Division: Polypodiophyta
- Class: Polypodiopsida
- Order: Ophioglossales
- Family: Ophioglossaceae
- Genus: Botrychium
- Species: B. lanceolatum

Binomial name
- Botrychium lanceolatum (S.G. Gmel.) Angstr.

Synonyms
- Osmunda lanceolata S.G.Gmel.

= Botrychium lanceolatum =

Lanceleaf Moonwort

Species of fern

Botrychium lanceolatum, known as lanceleaf moonwort, is a species of plant belonging to the family Ophioglossaceae.

Its native range is subarctic and temperate Northern Hemisphere including Greenland.

== Taxonomy ==
Botrychium lanceolatum was first described as Osmunda lanceolata by Samuel Gottlieb Gmelin in 1768.
