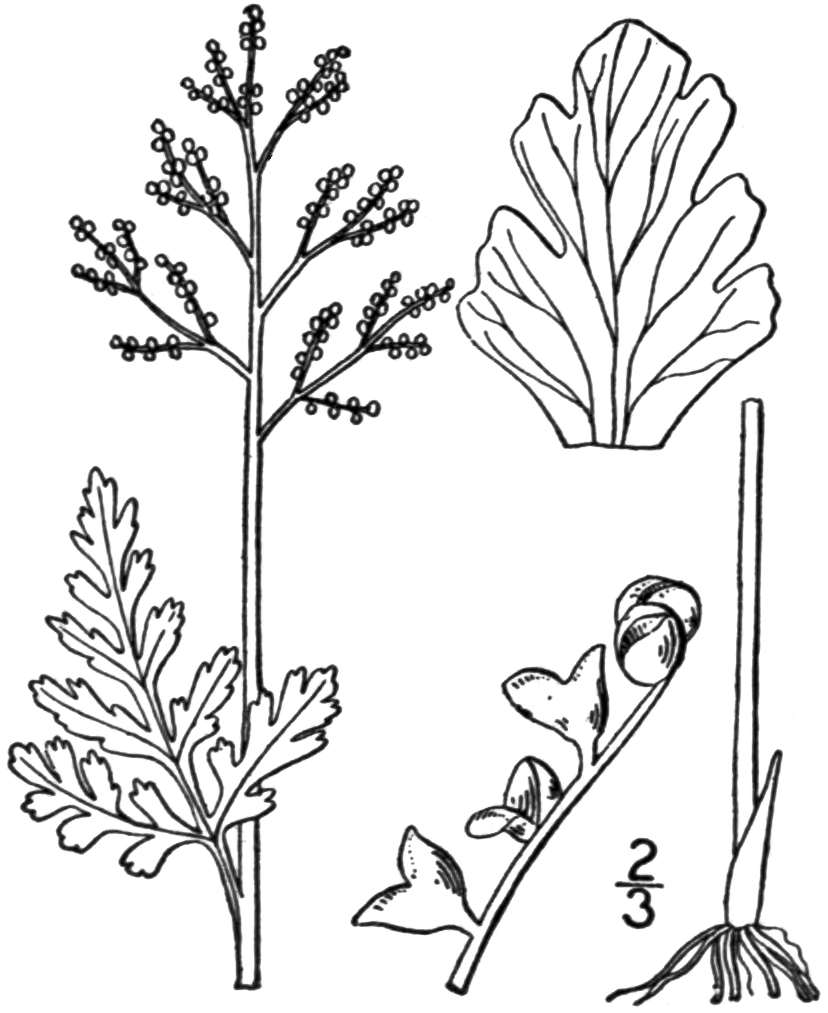

Conservation status
- Vulnerable (NatureServe)

Scientific classification
- Kingdom: Plantae
- Clade: Tracheophytes
- Division: Polypodiophyta
- Class: Polypodiopsida
- Order: Ophioglossales
- Family: Ophioglossaceae
- Genus: Botrychium
- Species: B. spathulatum

Binomial name
- Botrychium spathulatum W.H.Wagner

= Botrychium spathulatum =

Species of fern

Botrychium spathulatum is a species of moonwort fern native to North America.
