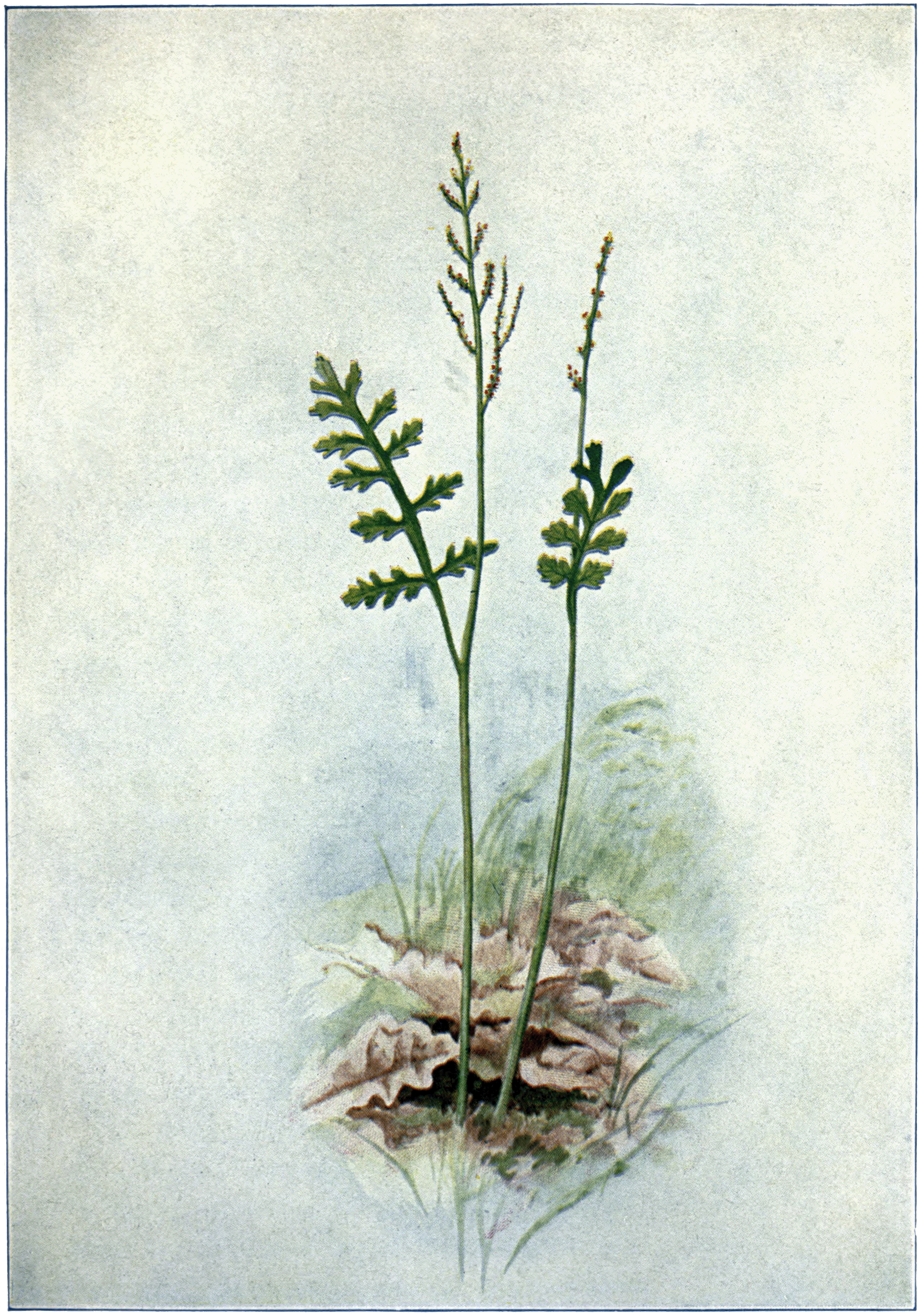
- Botrychium matricariifolium

Conservation status
- Secure (NatureServe)

Scientific classification
- Kingdom: Plantae
- Clade: Embryophytes
- Clade: Tracheophytes
- Division: Polypodiophyta
- Class: Polypodiopsida
- Order: Ophioglossales
- Family: Ophioglossaceae
- Genus: Botrychium
- Species: B. matricariifolium

Binomial name
- Botrychium matricariifolium (Retz.) A.Braun ex W.D.J.Koch

Synonymsref name=KewPOWO/>
- Botrychium lunaria var. matricariifolium (Retz.) Döll; Osmunda lunaria var. matricariifolia Retz.; Botrychium lunaria var. rhombeum Ångstr.; Botrychium matricariifolium f. gracile Weath.; Botrychium matricariifolium f. rhombeum (Ångstr.) M.Broun; Botrychium matricariifolium var. rhombeum (Ångstr.) Farw.; Botrychium matricariifolium subsp. typicum R.T.Clausen; Botrychium neglectum Alph.Wood; Botrychium neglectum f. gracile House; Botrychium ramosum (Roth) Asch.; Botrychium ramosum var. neglectum Farw.; Botrychium rutaceum Willd.; Botrychium tenellum Ångstr.; Osmunda ramosa Roth; Osmunda rutacea Poir.

= Botrychium matricariifolium =

Species of fern

Botrychium matricariifolium (orth.var. B. matricariaefolium) is a species of fern in the Ophioglossaceae family. It is referred to by the common names chamomile grape-fern, daisyleaf grape-fern, and matricary grape-fern. It is native to Europe and parts of eastern North America, including eastern Canada and parts of the United States.

This fleshy fern grows up to 30 cm (12 in) tall. It produces dull green sterile leaf blades up to 10 cm (3.9 in) long by 9 cm (3.5 in) wide divided into a few pairs of segments. The fertile leaves are a bit longer and bear the spores.

== Rarity ==
This species is very rare in most European countries. In Ukraine in total, there were recorded 17 loci: 10 before 1980, after 1980 – 7, as before and after 1980 – 0 location.
