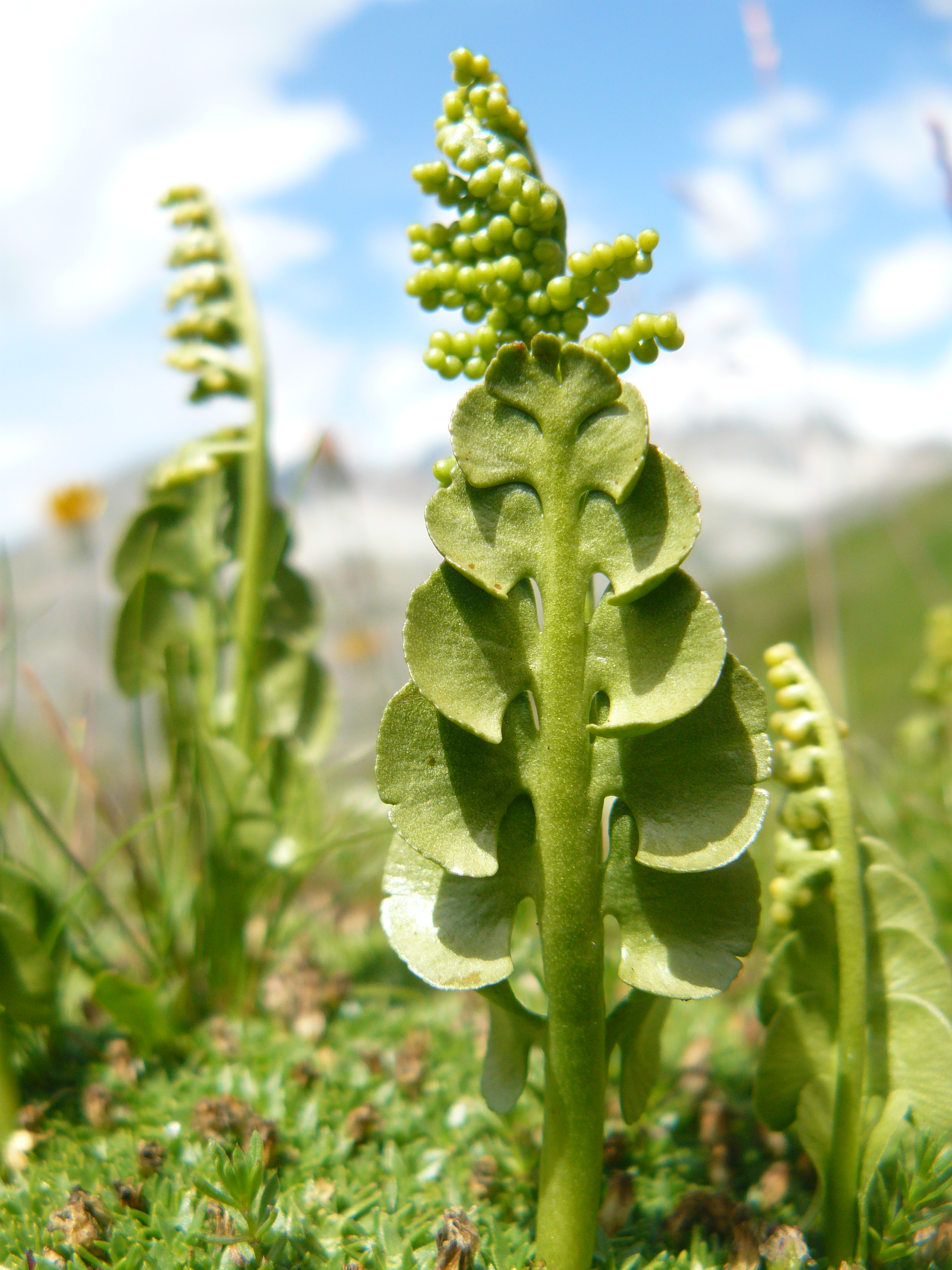

Conservation status
- Least Concern (IUCN 3.1)

- Secure (NatureServe)

Scientific classification
- Kingdom: Plantae
- Clade: Tracheophytes
- Division: Polypodiophyta
- Class: Polypodiopsida
- Order: Ophioglossales
- Family: Ophioglossaceae
- Genus: Botrychium
- Species: B. lunaria

Binomial name
- Botrychium lunaria (L.) Sw.

Synonyms
- Blechnum racemosum Bubani; Botrychium lunatum (Salisb.) Gray; Botrypus lunaria (L.) Rich.; Ophioglossum pennatum Lam.; Osmunda lunaria L.; Osmunda lunata Salisb.

= Botrychium lunaria =

Species of plant

Botrychium lunaria is a species of fern in the family Ophioglossaceae known by the common name moonwort or common moonwort. It is the most widely distributed moonwort, growing throughout the Northern Hemisphere across Eurasia and from Alaska to Greenland, as well as temperate parts of the Southern Hemisphere.

== Description ==
This is a small plant growing up to 30 cm (12 in) in height from an underground caudex. The leaf is pinnate and is divided into a sterile frond and a fertile frond. The sterile frond of the leaf has 4 to 9 pairs of fan-shaped leaflets or pinnae. The fertile part of the leaf is very different in shape, with grapelike clusters of round sporangia producing spores by which it reproduces. As in other members of the family Ophioglossaceae, this species is eusporangiate, the sporangia derived from more than one initial cell and having sporangial walls more than one cell thick. Their spores develop into underground, mycotrophic gametophytes. Moonworts die down at the end of summer, frequently lying dormant for several seasons before re-appearing.

== Taxonomy ==
The first formal species description of Botrychium lunaria was made by Carl Linnaeus in 1753 as Osmunda lunaria.

== Distribution ==
Moonwort has a circumpolar distribution, being recorded in Eurasia, North America and Greenland. It also occurs in north Africa, the Himalayas, and temperate zones of Australia, Tasmania, New Zealand and South America. Although its distribution is patchy, and it may be locally rare, it is rated as of least concern in The IUCN Red List of threatened species. There is evidence of some decline in the British Isles, and in Ukraine, 189 loci were recorded, 118 before 1980, 58 after 1980 and 13 after 1980. In Britain it is found mainly in the north and west, while in the lowlands of England it has been largely lost and the decline continues. For example, in Worcestershire it had been recorded at seven sites in the past but now appears to be restricted to a single site.

== Habitat and ecology ==
Botrychium lunaria is a species which grows on relatively dry to moist short grassland, meadows, small woods, heaths and moors frequently on higher ground and rarely in forests, either deciduous or pine, or open woodland. It has also been recorded on dune slacks. Within Europe the common moonwort is a characteristic species of four habitats, namely acid Alpine and sub-Alpine grassland, southern Balkan montane grasslands, closed sand steppes in central Europe and grasslands in Finland and Scandinavia. It will also colonise brownfield sites such as spoil heaps and shale brings, this is especially notable in central Scotland. It has a preference for neutral to alkaline soils, often over limestone or chalk, or in other lime-rich habitats. It occurs up to 2,500 metres (8,200 ft). In the younger and adult states it is reliant on mycorrhizal relationships and this means that it can be vulnerable to disturbance of the soil. The presence of rotting plant material may be required for this fern to grow successfully.

In Finland the plant suffers from modern agriculture, loss of rough pastures and eutrophication of glades and dry meadows and its status is near threatened.

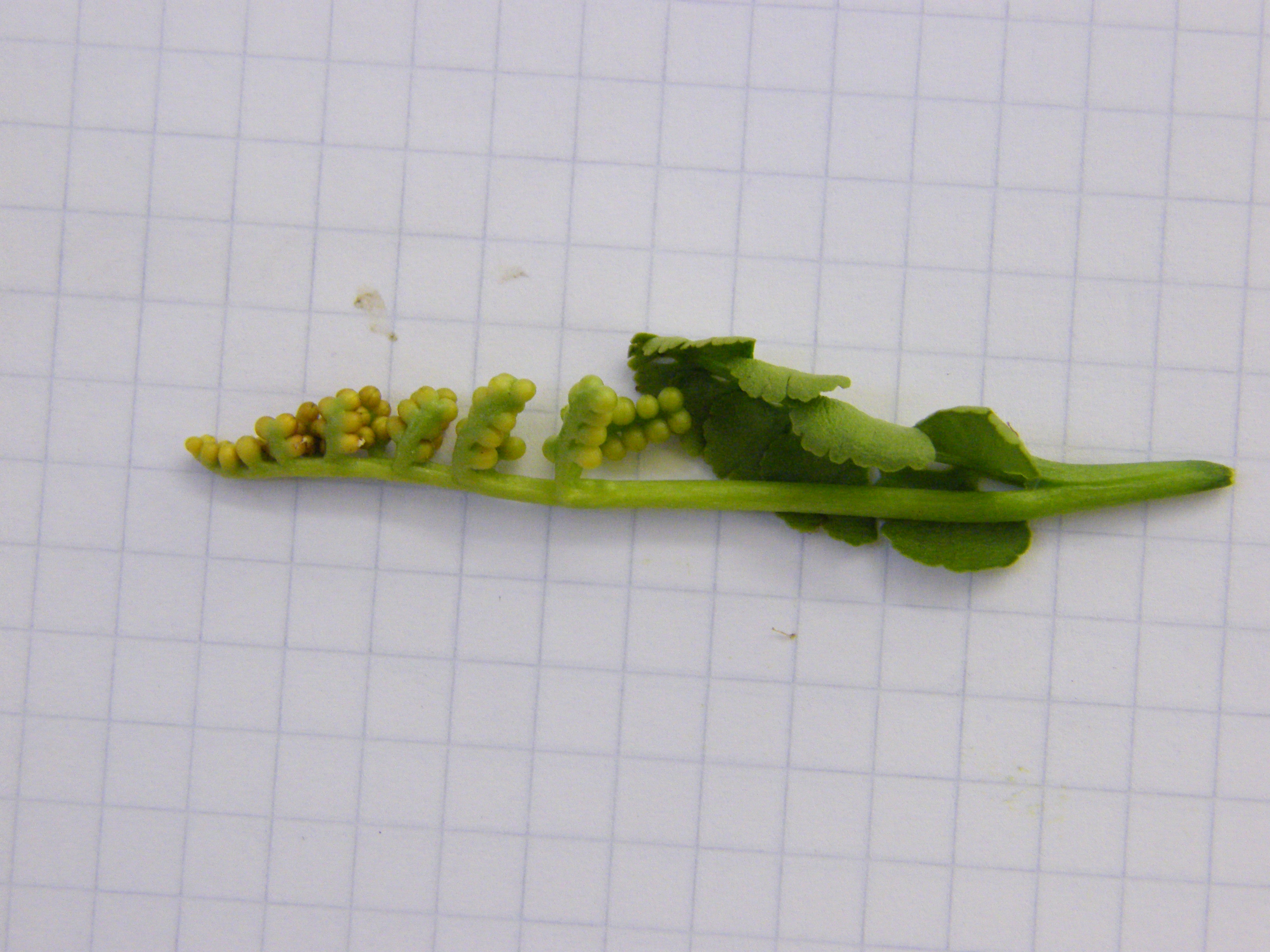
Frond; background squares are 5mm across
