= Warren H. Wagner =

American botanist (1920–2000)

Warren Herbert Wagner
- Born: August 29, 1920
- Died: January 8, 2000 (aged 79)
- Education: University of California, Berkeley
- Spouse: Florence Signaigo Wagner
- Scientific career
- Fields: Botany
- Institutions: University of Michigan
- Doctoral advisor: Edwin Bingham Copeland
- Author abbrev. (botany): W.H.Wagner

Warren Herbert Wagner Jr. (August 29, 1920 – January 8, 2000) was an eminent American botanist who was trained at Berkeley with E.B. Copeland and lived most of his professional career in Michigan. The standard author abbreviation W.H.Wagner is used to indicate this person as the author when citing a botanical name.

== History ==
Wagner was instructed in the ways of plant microphotograph and embryology by Marion S. Cave. Wagner was a longtime faculty member at the University of Michigan. He was most respected among his colleagues and students for his genius in discerning and articulating the differences in form between plant species in the context of their variation with environmental factors.

He developed, in the early 1960s, the first algorithm for discerning phylogenetic relationships among species based upon their respective character states observed over a set of characters. This work was honored by James Farris and Arnold Kluge in their later appellation of related algorithms as "Wagner parsimony."

Wagner became a pteridologist later in life, specializing in ferns, especially the Botrychiaceae. Having served in the U.S. Military in the Pacific Theater in World War II, he maintained a lifelong interest in the diversity and origin of the ferns of Hawaii. Working with his wife Florence Signaigo Wagner, an accomplished cytologist, he resolved the relationships of an array of polyploid complexes in North American ferns, first the Appalachian trio of Asplenium species, then in Dryopteris and Polystichum.

He was President of the Botanical Society of America in 1977. He was elected to the United States National Academy of Sciences in 1985.

Apparently among modern phylogenetic systematists, Wagner is alone in having been mentioned in a Hollywood film − A New Leaf, starring Elaine May and Walter Matthau.
