= List of ferns and fern allies of Great Britain and Ireland =

This page's list covers the ferns and allies (Lycopodiopsida, Equisetopsida and Pteridopsida) found in Great Britain and Ireland. For the background to this list see parent article List of the vascular plants of Britain and Ireland.

== Class Lycopodiopsida ==
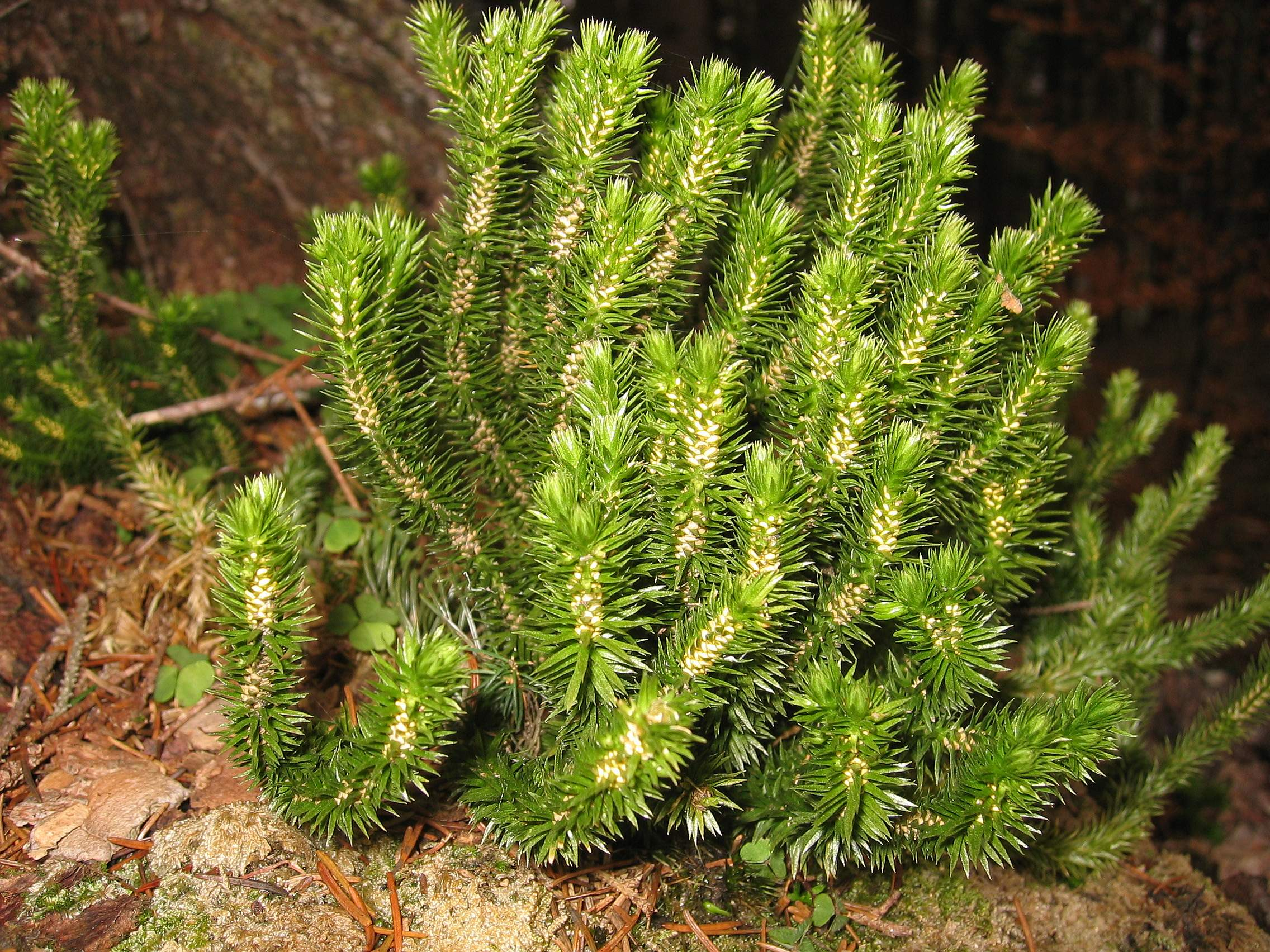
Huperzia selago (northern clubmoss)

=== Order Lycopodiales ===
==== Family Lycopodiaceae (clubmosses) ====
English name	Scientific name	Status
Alpine clubmoss	Diphasiastrum alpinum	Native
Issler's clubmoss	Diphasiastrum × issleri	Native
Fir clubmoss	Huperzia selago	Native
Stag's-horn clubmoss	Lycopodium clavatum	Native
Hare's-foot clubmoss	Lycopodium lagopus	Native
Marsh clubmoss	Lycopodiella inundata	Native
Interrupted clubmoss	Spinulum annotinum	Native

=== Order Selaginellales ===
==== Family Selaginellaceae (spikemosses) ====
English name	Scientific name	Status
Krauss's clubmoss	Selaginella kraussiana	Introduced
Lesser clubmoss	Selaginella selaginoides	Native

=== Order Isoetales ===
==== Family Isoetaceae (quillworts) ====
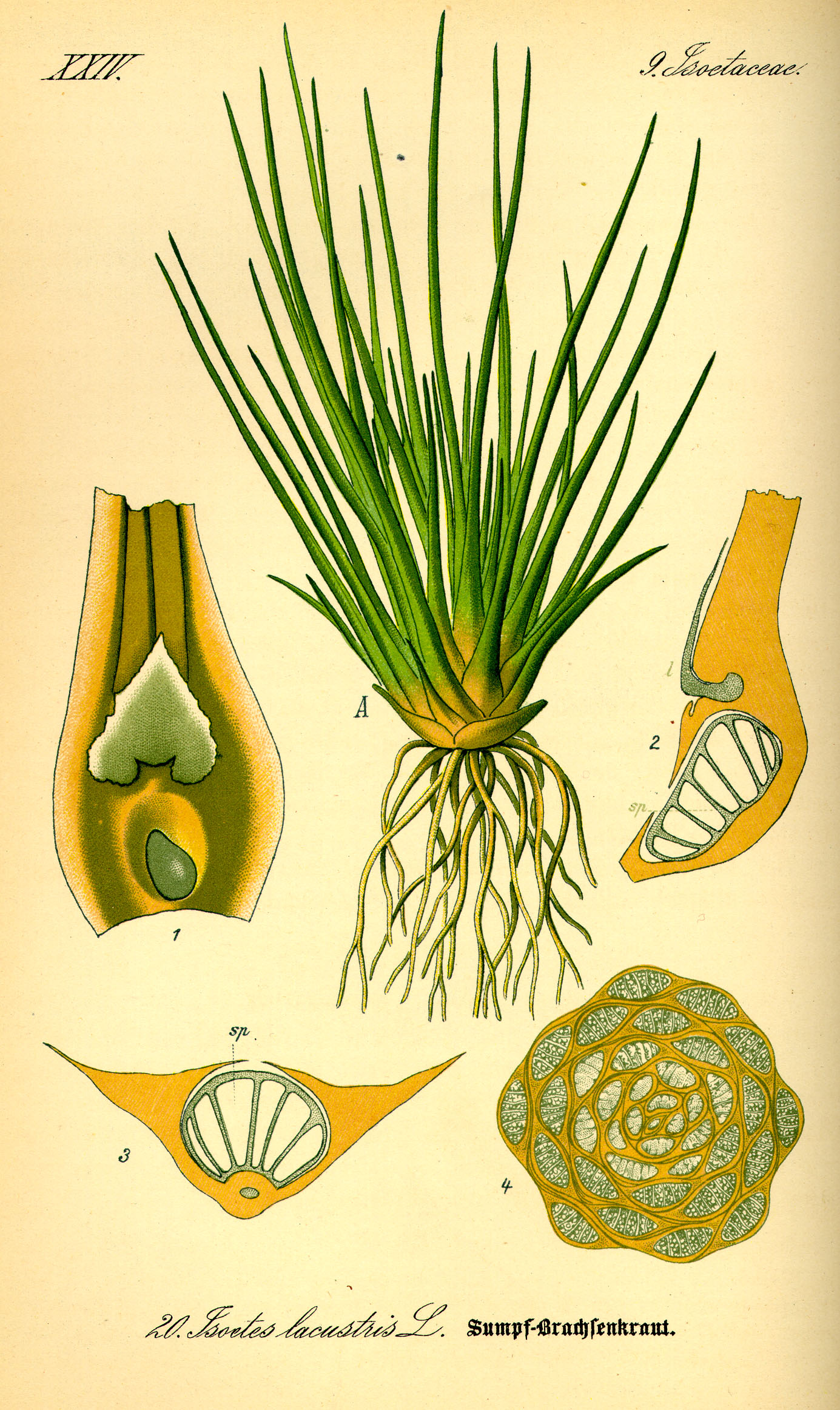
Isoetes lacustris (lake quillwort or Merlin's grass)

English name	Scientific name	Status
Spring quillwort	Isoetes echinospora	Native
Land quillwort	Isoetes histrix	Native
Quillwort	Isoetes lacustris	Native

== Class Polypodiopsida (ferns) ==
=== Order Equisetales ===
==== Family Equisetaceae (horsetails) ====
English name	Scientific name	Status
Field horsetail	Equisetum arvense	Native
Water horsetail	Equisetum fluviatile	Native
Rough horsetail	Equisetum hyemale	Native
Marsh horsetail	Equisetum palustre	Native
Shady horsetail	Equisetum pratense	Native
Branched horsetail	Equisetum ramosissimum	Introduced
Wood horsetail	Equisetum sylvaticum	Native
Great horsetail	Equisetum telmateia	Native
Variegated horsetail	Equisetum variegatum	Native

=== Order Ophioglossales ===
==== Family Ophioglossaceae (adder's-tongues) ====
English name	Scientific name	Status
Moonwort	Botrychium lunaria	Native
Small adder's-tongue	Ophioglossum azoricum	Native
Least adder's-tongue	Ophioglossum lusitanicum	Native
Southern adder's-tongue	Ophioglossum vulgatum	Native

=== Order Osmundales ===
==== Family Osmundaceae (royal ferns) ====
English name	Scientific name	Status
Royal fern	Osmunda regalis	Native

=== Order Polypodiales (polypod ferns, cathetogyrates) ===
==== Family Pteridaceae (maidenhair fern family) ====
English name	Scientific name	Status
Maidenhair fern	Adiantum capillus-veneris	Native
Parsley fern	Cryptogramma crispa	Native
Ribbon fern	Pteris cretica	Introduced

==== Family Hymenophyllaceae (filmy ferns, bristle ferns) ====
English name	Scientific name	Status
Tunbridge filmy-fern	Hymenophyllum tunbrigense	Native
Wilson's filmy-fern	Hymenophyllum wilsonii	Native
Killarney fern	Vandenboschia speciosa	Native

==== Family Polypodiaceae ====
English name	Scientific name	Status
Southern polypody	Polypodium cambricum	Native
Intermediate polypody	Polypodium interjectum	Native
Polypody	Polypodium vulgare	Native
Kangaroo fern	Zealandia pustulata	Introduced

==== Family Dennstaedtiaceae (bracken family) ====
English name	Scientific name	Status
Bracken	Pteridium aquilinum	Native
Pig fern	Hypolepis ambigua	Naturalised

==== Family Thelypteridaceae (marsh ferns) ====
English name	Scientific name	Status
Beech fern	Phegopteris connectilis	Native
Lemon-scented fern	Thelypteris limbosperma	Native
Marsh fern	Thelypteris palustris	Native

==== Family Aspleniaceae (spleenworts) ====
English name	Scientific name	Status
Black spleenwort	Asplenium adiantum-nigrum	Native
Rustyback	Asplenium ceterach	Native
Sea spleenwort	Asplenium marinum	Native
Lanceolate spleenwort	Asplenium obovatum	Native
Irish spleenwort	Asplenium onopteris	Native
Wall-rue	Asplenium ruta-muraria	Native
Hart's-tongue	Asplenium scolopendrium	Native
Forked spleenwort	Asplenium septentrionale	Native
Maidenhair spleenwort	Asplenium trichomanes	Native
Green spleenwort	Asplenium viride	Native

==== Family Woodsiaceae (cliff ferns) ====
English name	Scientific name	Status
Alpine lady-fern	Athyrium distentifolium	Native
Lady-fern	Athyrium filix-femina	Native
Newman's lady-fern	Athyrium flexile	Native
Dickie's bladder-fern	Cystopteris dickieana	Native
Brittle bladder-fern	Cystopteris fragilis	Native
Mountain bladder-fern	Cystopteris montana	Native
Oak fern	Gymnocarpium dryopteris	Native
Limestone fern	Gymnocarpium robertianum	Native
Ostrich fern	Matteuccia struthiopteris	Introduced
Sensitive fern	Onoclea sensibilis	Introduced
Alpine woodsia	Woodsia alpina	Native
Oblong woodsia	Woodsia ilvensis	Native

==== Family Dryopteridaceae (wood ferns) ====
English name	Scientific name	Status
House holly-fern	Cyrtomium falcatum	Introduced
Hay-scented buckler-fern	Dryopteris aemula	Native
Scaly male-fern	Dryopteris affinis	Native
Narrow buckler-fern	Dryopteris carthusiana	Native
Crested buckler-fern	Dryopteris cristata	Native
Broad buckler-fern	Dryopteris dilatata	Native
Northern buckler-fern	Dryopteris expansa	Native
Male-fern	Dryopteris filix-mas	Native
Rigid buckler-fern	Dryopteris mindshelkensis	Native
Mountain male-fern	Dryopteris oreades	Native
Scaly buckler-fern	Dryopteris remota	Extinct
Hard shield fern	Polystichum aculeatum	Native
Holly fern	Polystichum lonchitis	Native
Soft shield fern	Polystichum setiferum	Native

=== Order Salviniales ===
==== Family Marsileaceae (pepperworts) ====
English name	Scientific name	Status
Pillwort	Pilularia globulifera	Native

==== Family Salviniaceae ====
English name	Scientific name	Status
Water fern	Azolla filiculoides	Introduced

=== Order Cyatheales (tree ferns etc.) ===
==== Family Dicksoniaceae ====
English name	Scientific name	Status
Australian tree-fern	Dicksonia antarctica	Introduced

==== Family Blechnaceae ====
English name	Scientific name	Status
Chilean hard-fern	Parablechnum cordatum	Introduced
Hard-fern	Struthiopteris spicant	Native

== See also ==
- Flora of Great Britain
- Flora of Ireland
- Ferns of Europe

== Notes ==
- Jersey fern (Anogramma leptophylla) is present in the Channel Islands as a native species, but does not occur in Britain or Ireland.
- Irish spleenwort (Asplenium onopteris) is native only to Ireland; it is represented in Britain only by an introduced population in North Wales.
