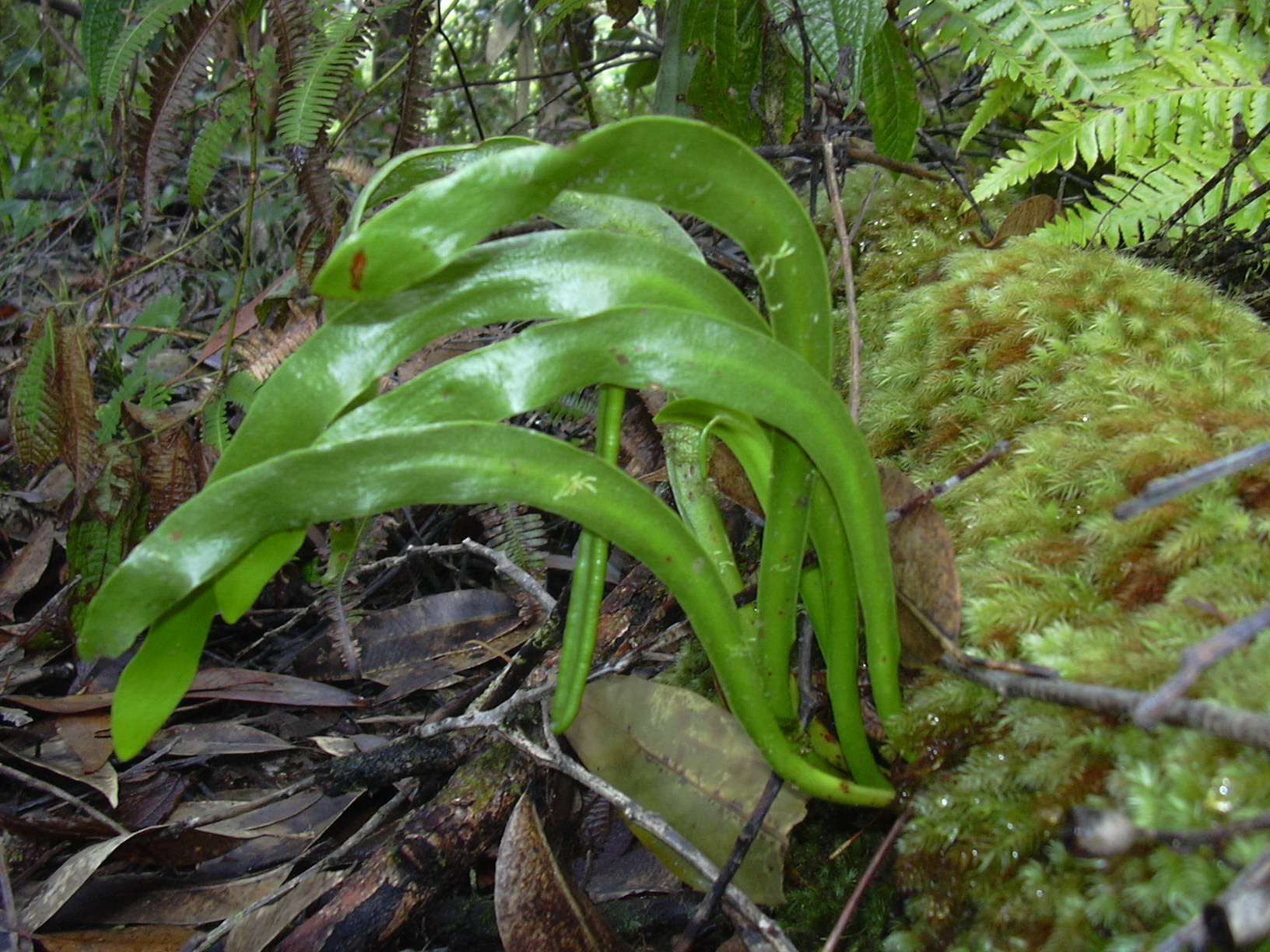
- Ophioderma falcatum in Hawaii

Scientific classification
- Kingdom: Plantae
- Clade: Tracheophytes
- Division: Polypodiophyta
- Class: Polypodiopsida
- Order: Ophioglossales
- Family: Ophioglossaceae
- Genus: Ophioderma
- Species: O. falcatum

Binomial name
- Ophioderma falcatum (C.Presl) O. Deg.

Synonyms
- Ophioglossum pendulum L. ssp. falcatum (C. Presl) R.T. Clausen; Ophioglossum falcatum (C. Presl) Fowler; Ophioderma pendulum (L.) C. Presl var. falcatum C. Presl

= Ophioderma falcatum =

Puapua moa

Species of fern

Ophioderma falcatum is known as puapua moa or laukahi in Hawaii. It is a fern in the family Ophioglossaceae, and many people still classify it as an Ophioglossum. Some consider it a subspecies of Ophioderma pendulum. An epiphyte, it is native to the Hawaiian islands except for Ni'ihau and Kaho'olawe. It also grows on some other Pacific islands.
