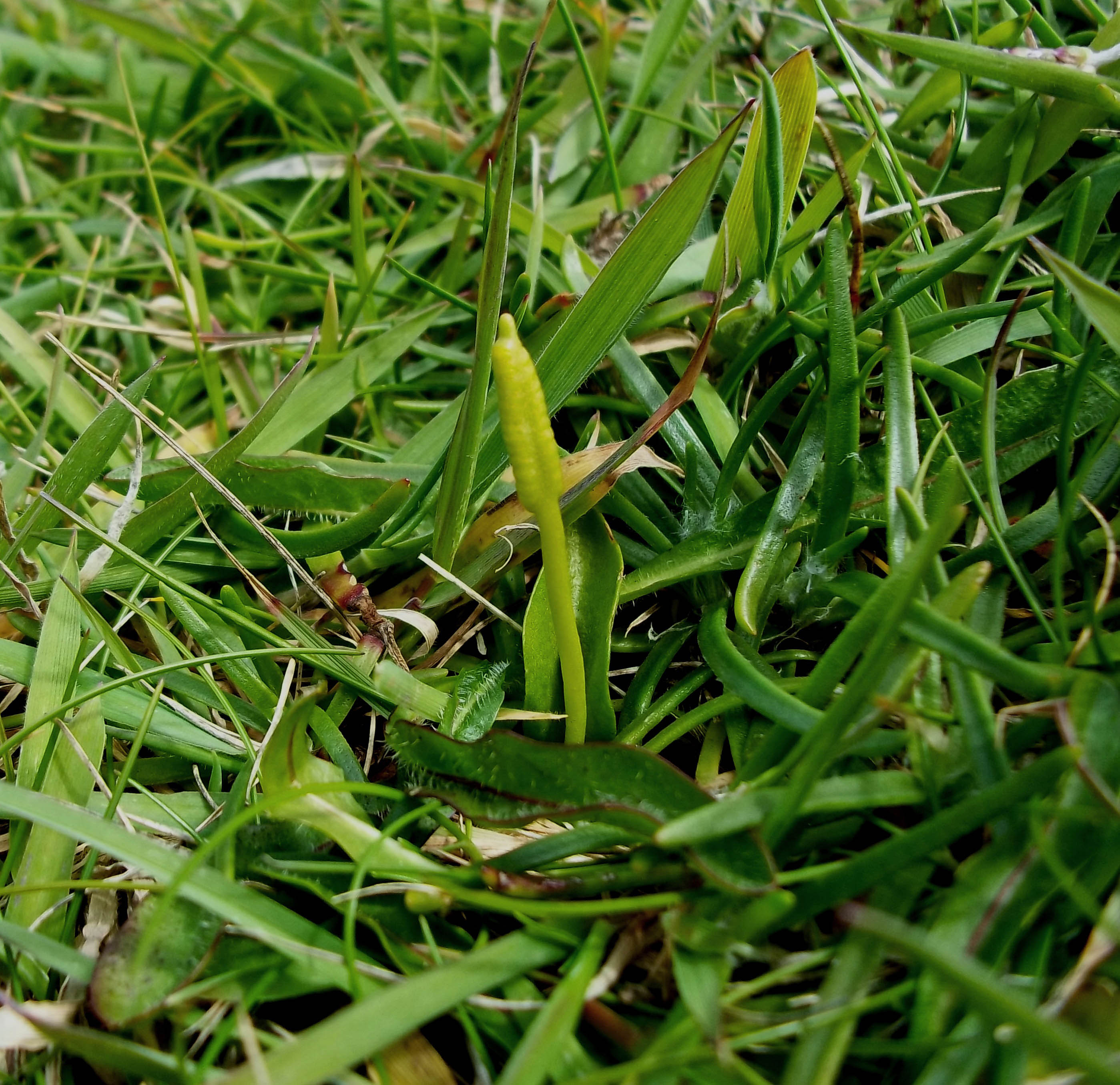
- In coastal grassland, Dooncarton, County Mayo, Ireland

Conservation status
- Least Concern (IUCN 3.1)

Scientific classification
- Kingdom: Plantae
- Clade: Tracheophytes
- Division: Polypodiophyta
- Class: Polypodiopsida
- Order: Ophioglossales
- Family: Ophioglossaceae
- Genus: Ophioglossum
- Species: O. azoricum

Binomial name
- Ophioglossum azoricum C. Presl

Synonyms
- Ophioglossum vulgatum L. subsp. ambiguum (Coss. & Germ.) E.F.Warb.; Ophioglossum sabulicolum Sauzé & Maillard; Ophioglossum vulgatum L. subsp. vulgatum var. minus Ostenf. & J.Gröntved; Ophioglossum vulgatum L. subsp. vulgatum var. islandicum A$A.Löve & D.Löve; Ophioglossum vulgatum L. subsp. polyphyllum auct., non A.Braun; Ophioglossum sabulicola Sauzé

= Ophioglossum azoricum =

Species of fern

Ophioglossum azoricum, the small adder's-tongue fern or lesser adder's-tongue fern, is a small fern of the family Ophioglossaceae.

== Distribution ==
Ophioglossum azoricum is an Atlantic–Mediterranean species native to islands in the northern Atlantic Ocean and adjacent western and southwestern Europe from Greenland, Iceland and the British Isles in the north, to Macaronesia and the Iberian Peninsula in the south. It also occurs in the Toscana region of Italy, Poland, the Czech Republic, and east to Cyprus, Turkey and Lebanon.

This species mostly occurs on bare or shortly vegetated ground on exposed coastal clifftops. An exception to this habitat preference is populations in the New Forest of Hampshire, where plants occur in tightly grazed damp grassland in a non-maritime setting.

In Iceland and Greenland, it is restricted to geothermal areas where higher temperatures allow its survival. This species is on the Icelandic list of endangered species.

== Description ==
The frond of Ophioglossum azoricum consists of a single, pointed leaf blade and a narrow pointed spore-bearing spike on a stalk. The spike has about 4–18 segments on each side, each of which opens up when ripe to release spores. The sterile blades are broadest near the middle and taper towards both ends.

=== Taxonomy ===
This taxon is sometimes treated as a subspecies of Ophioglossum vulgatum, as Ophioglossum vulgatum ssp. ambiguum (Coss. & Germ.) E.F. Warburg.

This species is thought to be derived from a hybrid between Ophioglossum vulgatum and Ophioglossum lusitanicum.

This species has a chromosome number of 2n=c.480.
