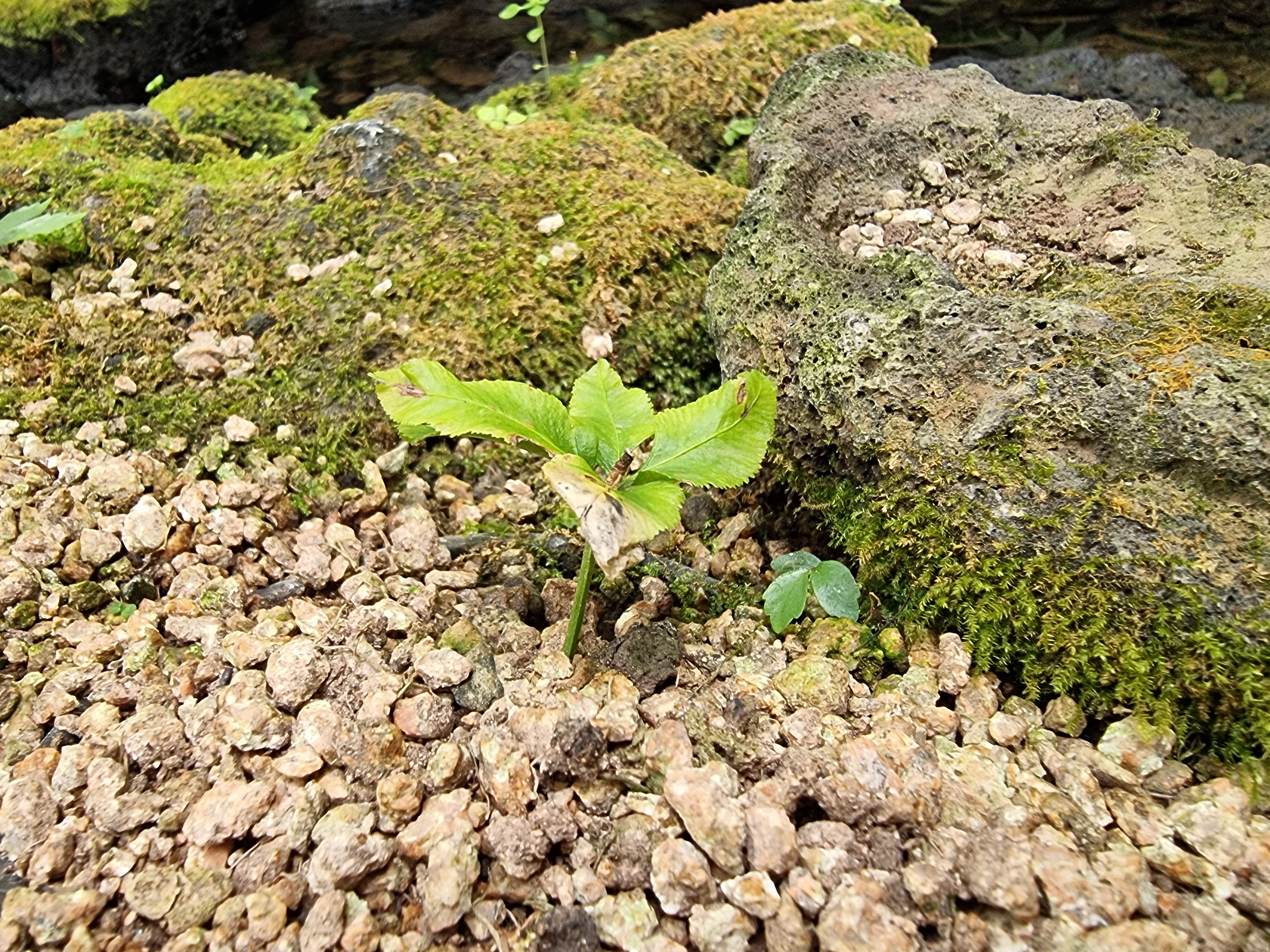

Conservation status
- Critically Endangered (IUCN 3.1)

Scientific classification
- Kingdom: Plantae
- Clade: Tracheophytes
- Division: Polypodiophyta
- Class: Polypodiopsida
- Order: Ophioglossales
- Family: Ophioglossaceae
- Subfamily: Mankyuoideae; J.R.Grant & B.Dauphin
- Genus: Mankyua; B.Y.Sun, M.H.Kim & C.H.Kim
- Species: M. chejuense

Binomial name
- Mankyua chejuense B.Y.Sun, M.H.Kim & C.H.Kim

= Mankyua =

Genus of ferns

Mankyua is a monotypic genus and fern in the Ophioglossales. Its only species, M. chejuense, grows only on Jeju Island of South Korea. While this plant is clearly ophioglossoid in the broad sense, its precise cladistic position is uncertain. It has a fused sporangial structure similar to Ophioglossum, but a vegetative structure, with palmately-radiating pinnae, reminiscent of Helminthostachys. It may be a basal offshoot of the ophioglossoid clade sensu stricto.

== Taxonomy ==
The genus name of Mankyua is in honour of Man Kyu Pak (1906-1988), who was a South Korean researcher and botanist (Pteridology).

The genus was circumscribed by Byung Yun Sun, Moon Hong Kim and Chul Hwan Kim in Taxon vol.50 (Issue 4) on page 1020 in 2001.

The Smith et al. classification of 2006, based on molecular phylogeny, placed Mankyua in Ophioglossaceae. Subsequent classifications have maintained this placement. The PPG I classification assigns it as the single member of the subfamily Mankyuoideae.

== Origin ==
Three phylogenetic analyses are performed on two cpDNA regions from 42 accessions representing the major lycophyte groups that were obtained from GenBank to pinpoint the exact phylogenetic position of M. chejuense (maximum parsimony, maximum likelihood, and Bayesian inference). In addition, a relaxed molecular clock with four fossil calibration points is used to estimate the divergence time. According to these finding, Mankyua may represent the oldest diverging lineage within the Ophioglossaceae or a sister clade to the group that includes Ophioglossum and Helminthostachys, depending on the phylogenetic position that is still unknown. Ophioglossaceae and its sister family, Psilotum, are thought to have shared a common ancestor as recently as 256 Ma, whereas Mankyua diverged as early as 195 Ma in the early Jurassic.
