= Cheiroglossa palmata =

Hand fern

Conservation status
- Apparently Secure (NatureServe)

Scientific classification
- Kingdom: Plantae
- Clade: Tracheophytes
- Division: Polypodiophyta
- Class: Polypodiopsida
- Order: Ophioglossales
- Family: Ophioglossaceae
- Genus: Cheiroglossa
- Species: C. palmata

Binomial name
- Cheiroglossa palmata (L.) Presl

Synonyms
- Cheiroglossa austrobrasiliensis Brade (synonym); Ophioderma palmatum (L.) Nakai; Ophioglossum palmatum L.

Species of plant

Cheiroglossa palmata, synonyms Ophioderma palmatum and Ophioglossum palmatum, variously known as hand fern, dwarf staghorn, or hand tongue, is an epiphytic or terrestrial fern. As an epiphyte it grows in old leaf bases of the cabbage palmetto (Sabal palm).

== Description ==
The leaves are palmately lobed and roughly shaped like a hand. They grow up to 30 cm wide and the margins are entire (no serration). The fertile fronds are a set of small tapering sporophores that bear the spores. There are several to many at the base of each leaf blade. On the sporophores are the sporangial clusters with sporangia in two rows, all embedded in compact, linear spikes. The main areoles large, usually more than 30 mm. The pale yellowish-brown roots are dichotomous. The gametophytes are brown to white, cylindric, and repeatedly branched.

== Taxonomy ==
The species was first described by Carl Linnaeus in 1753, as Ophioglossum palmatum. The genus Ophioglossum has been circumscribed in different ways, and Ophioglossum palmatum has been placed in the genus Ophioderma as well as Cheiroglossa. The Pteridophyte Phylogeny Group classification of 2016 (PPG I) uses Cheiroglossa. Whatever the genus, the species is placed in the family Ophioglossaceae of the order Ophioglossales.

== Distribution ==
This plant is found in the Neotropics, but in the United States, it is restricted to the far southeast, primarily Florida. It has become rare in Florida due to overcollection and extensive drainage of natural wetlands from development and water diversion projects. It is reported to not survive cultivation.
