= Ophioderma =

Ophioderma is the scientific name of two genera of organisms and may refer to:

- Ophioderma (echinoderm), a genus of sea stars in the family Ophiodermatidae
- Ophioderma (plant), a genus of ferns in the family Ophioglossaceae
