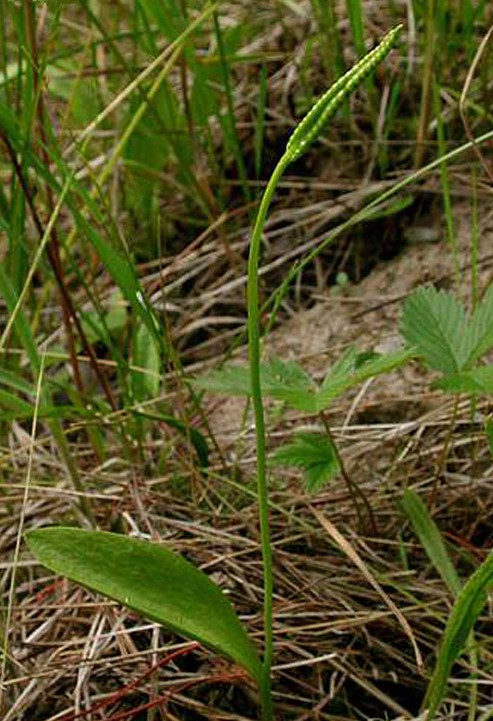

Conservation status
- Secure (NatureServe)

Scientific classification
- Kingdom: Plantae
- Clade: Embryophytes
- Clade: Tracheophytes
- Division: Polypodiophyta
- Class: Polypodiopsida
- Order: Ophioglossales
- Family: Ophioglossaceae
- Genus: Ophioglossum
- Species: O. pusillum

Binomial name
- Ophioglossum pusillum Raf.

= Ophioglossum pusillum =

Species of fern

Ophioglossum pusillum is a species of fern in the family Ophioglossaceae known by the common name northern adder's tongue.

It is native to northern North America, where it is widespread in moist areas such as marshes, fens, and meadows. It is found from northern California through Alaska on the west, and from central Appalachia through the northern Great Plains and the Great Lakes regions, across the Northeastern United States and Eastern Canada.

== Description ==
Ophioglossum pusillum is a small, inconspicuous, fleshy perennial plant growing from a caudex no more than 3 centimeters (1.2 in) wide. It produces one leaf per year.

The leaf is divided into a thin, pale green blade-shaped part, which is sterile, and a fertile stalk lined with two rows of sporangia.
