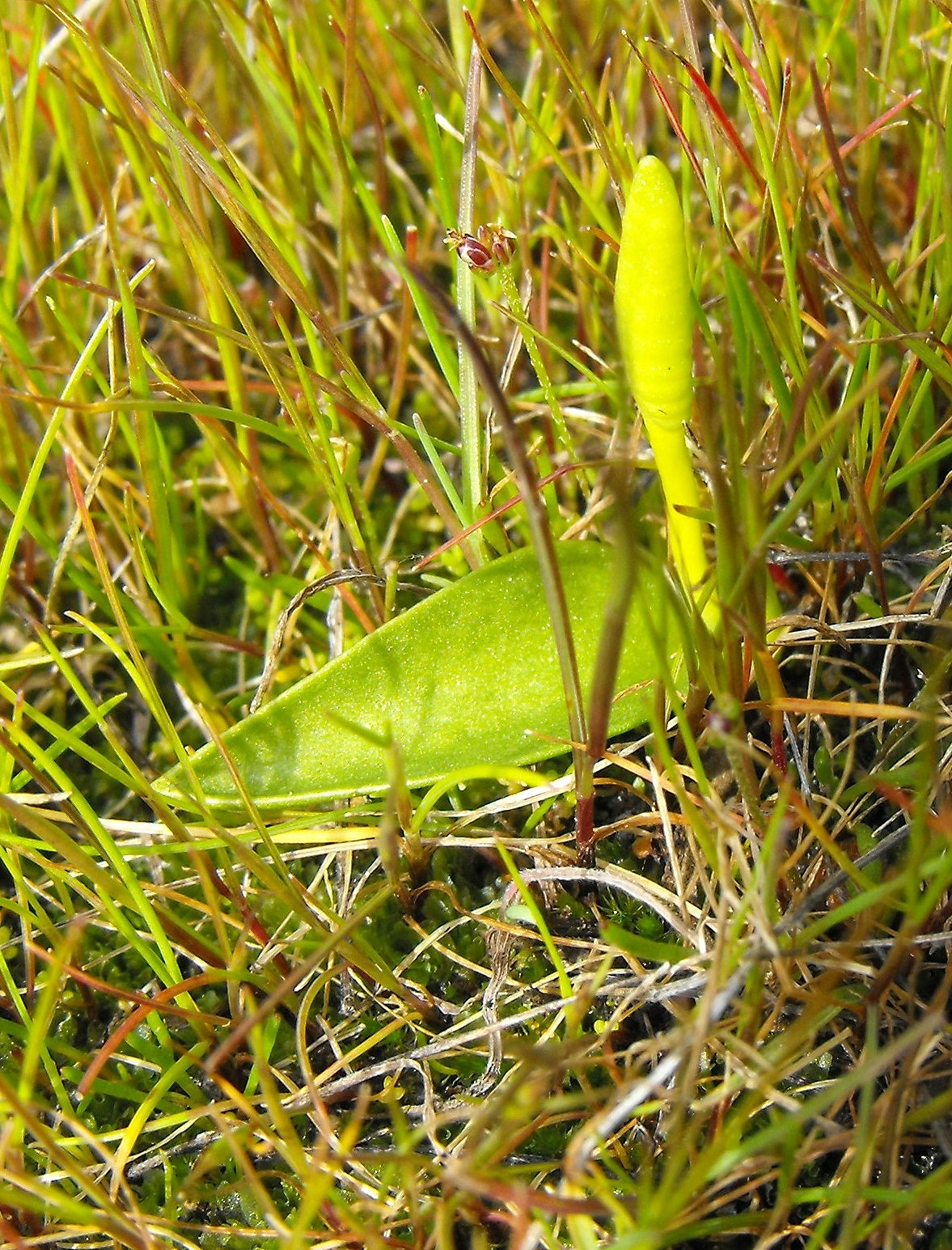
- On Carmel Mountain, San Diego, California.

Scientific classification
- Kingdom: Plantae
- Clade: Embryophytes
- Clade: Tracheophytes
- Division: Polypodiophyta
- Class: Polypodiopsida
- Order: Ophioglossales
- Family: Ophioglossaceae
- Genus: Ophioglossum
- Species: O. californicum

Binomial name
- Ophioglossum californicum Prantl

= Ophioglossum californicum =

Species of fern

Ophioglossum californicum, known by the common name California adder's tongue, is an uncommon species of fern in the family Ophioglossaceae.

The fern is native to California, and Baja California in Northwestern Mexico. It is found in the San Joaquin Valley, Sierra Nevada foothills, and along the central and southern coast regions. Habitats include moist areas, such as wet pastures and vernal pools, coastal grasslands, and coastal/montane/interior chaparral micro-habitats. It becomes very rare in dry years.

== Description ==
Ophioglossum californicum is a small, fleshy perennial plant growing from a caudex no more than 1.5 centimeters (0.59 in) wide.

It produces one leaf per year. The leaf is divided into a thick, green blade-shaped part, which is sterile, and a fertile stalk lined with two rows of sporangia, the reproductive parts.

== See also ==
- California coastal sage and chaparral ecoregion
- California montane chaparral and woodlands
- California interior chaparral and woodlands
