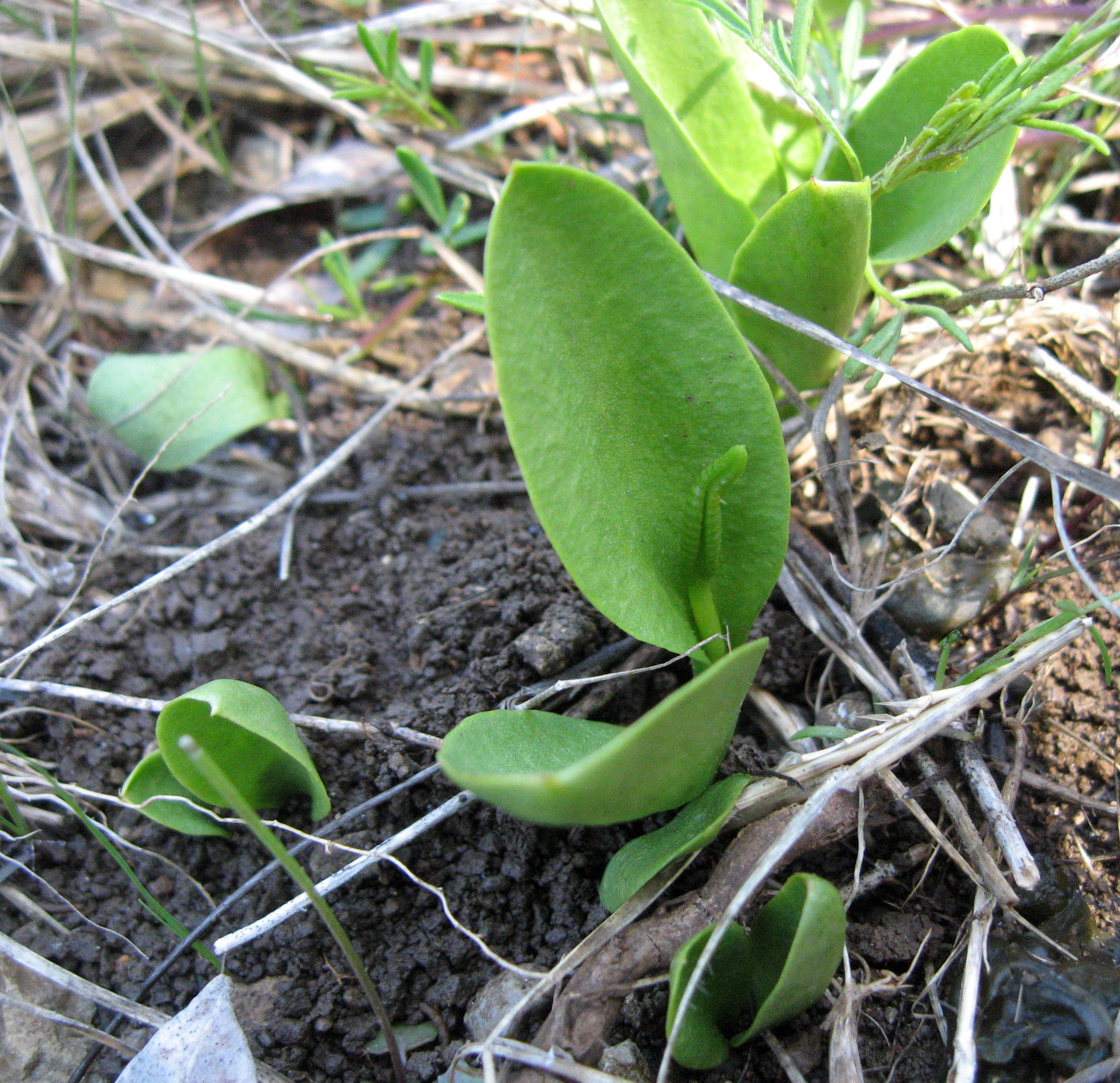

Scientific classification
- Kingdom: Plantae
- Clade: Embryophytes
- Clade: Tracheophytes
- Division: Polypodiophyta
- Class: Polypodiopsida
- Order: Ophioglossales
- Family: Ophioglossaceae
- Genus: Ophioglossum
- Species: O. engelmannii

Binomial name
- Ophioglossum engelmannii Prantl

= Ophioglossum engelmannii =

Species of fern

Ophioglossum engelmannii, commonly known as the limestone adder's-tongue, is a species of fern native to the Western Hemisphere. It is widespread and native to the United States, Mexico, and Central America. Its primary natural habitat is dry barrens and glades in calcareous areas.

It is a small species that produces leaves in the spring and dies back in the summer. A second growth of leaves is sometimes produced with the fall rains.
