= Ophioglossum petiolatum =

Scientific classification
- Kingdom: Plantae
- Clade: Tracheophytes
- Division: Polypodiophyta
- Class: Polypodiopsida
- Order: Ophioglossales
- Family: Ophioglossaceae
- Genus: Ophioglossum
- Species: O. petiolatum

Binomial name
- Ophioglossum petiolatum Hook.

Synonyms
- Ophioglossum elongatum A.Cunn.; Ophioglossum floridanum E.P.St.John; Ophioglossum floridanum f. favosum E.P.St.John; Ophioglossum floridanum f. reticulosum E.P.St.John; Ophioglossum litorale Makino; Ophioglossum moluccanum Schltdl.; Ophioglossum moluccanum f. complicatum Miq.; Ophioglossum namegatae Nish. & Kurita; Ophioglossum reticulatum f. complicatum (Miq.) Wieff.; Ophioglossum vulgatum var. australasiaticum Luerss.

Species of fern

Ophioglossum petiolatum is a species of fern in the family Ophioglossaceae. William Jackson Hooker named this species in 1823.

The species occurs in parts of Asia, Australia, and North America.

== Common names ==
According to Encyclopedia of Life, in English the species goes by the common name longstem adderstongue or long-stem adder's-tongue.

Some universities, including the Missouri Department of Conservation, give it the common name stalked adder's-tongue.

== Description ==
It contains about 50 to 150 chloroplasts per epidermal cell and more than 200 in mesophyll cells.

It grows quickly in pots making it suitable for botany instruction.

== Distribution ==
Ophioglossum petiolatum has a tropical and subtropical distribution in South America and Africa. It was probably introduced to North America early in the 1900s. It is found in Hawaii but may have been introduced recently. It was introduced to other states in the United States. In the state of Missouri it only occurs in Pemiscot County. In Alabama it is present in 5 counties. In Virginia it is present in 3 counties, first being reported in the state on the lawn of Tabernacle United Methodist Church in the year 1979.

It is rare in New Zealand. Robert Malcolm Laing was the first to record this species in Norfolk Island.
