= Rhizoglossum =

Scientific classification
- Kingdom: Plantae
- Clade: Tracheophytes
- Division: Polypodiophyta
- Class: Polypodiopsida
- Order: Ophioglossales
- Family: Ophioglossaceae
- Genus: Rhizoglossum; C.Presl
- Species: R. bergianum

Binomial name
- Rhizoglossum bergianum (Schltdl.) C.Presl

Synonyms
- Ophioglossum bergianum Schltdl.

Genus of ferns

Rhizoglossum is a genus of fern in the family Ophioglossaceae. Its only species is Rhizoglossum bergianum, native to the Cape Provinces of South Africa. The species was first described, as Ophioglossum bergianum, by Carl Presl in 1825, and transferred by Diederich von Schlechtendal to his new genus Rhizoglossum in 1845. Some sources retain the species in Ophioglossum.
