= List of conifers of Great Britain and Ireland =

This page covers the conifers (class Pinopsida). For the background to this list see parent article List of the vascular plants of Britain and Ireland.

All are part of the order Pinales.

Status key: * indicates an introduced species and e indicates an extinct species.

== Species list ==
=== Family Pinaceae (pines) ===
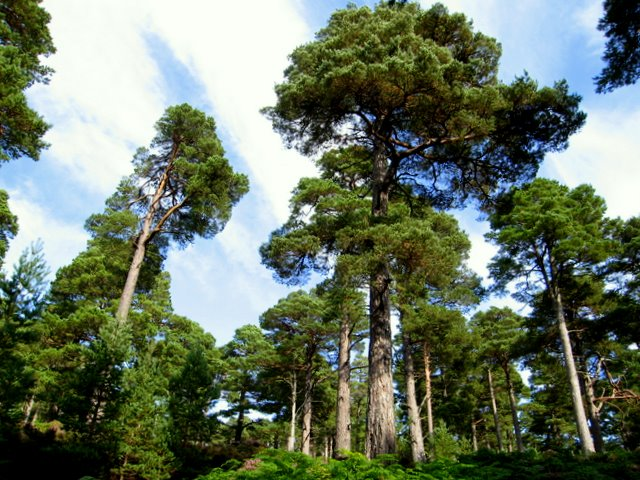
Scots pine (Pinus sylvestris)

English name	Scientific name	Status
Scots pine	Pinus sylvestris	
European black pine	Pinus nigra	*
Lodgepole pine	Pinus contorta	*
Maritime pine	Pinus pinaster	*
Monterey pine	Pinus radiata	*
Eastern white pine	Pinus strobus	*
Sitka spruce	Picea sitchensis	*
Norway spruce	Picea abies	*
European larch	Larix decidua	*
Japanese larch	Larix kaempferi	*
Coast Douglas-fir	Pseudotsuga menziesii	*
Western hemlock	Tsuga heterophylla	*
Silver fir	Abies alba	*
Grand fir	Abies grandis	*
Noble fir	Abies procera	*
Deodar cedar	Cedrus deodara	*
Lebanon cedar	Cedrus libani var atlantica	*

=== Family Araucariaceae (araucarians) ===
English name	Scientific name	Status
Monkey-puzzle	Araucaria araucana	*

=== Family Cupressaceae (cypresses) ===
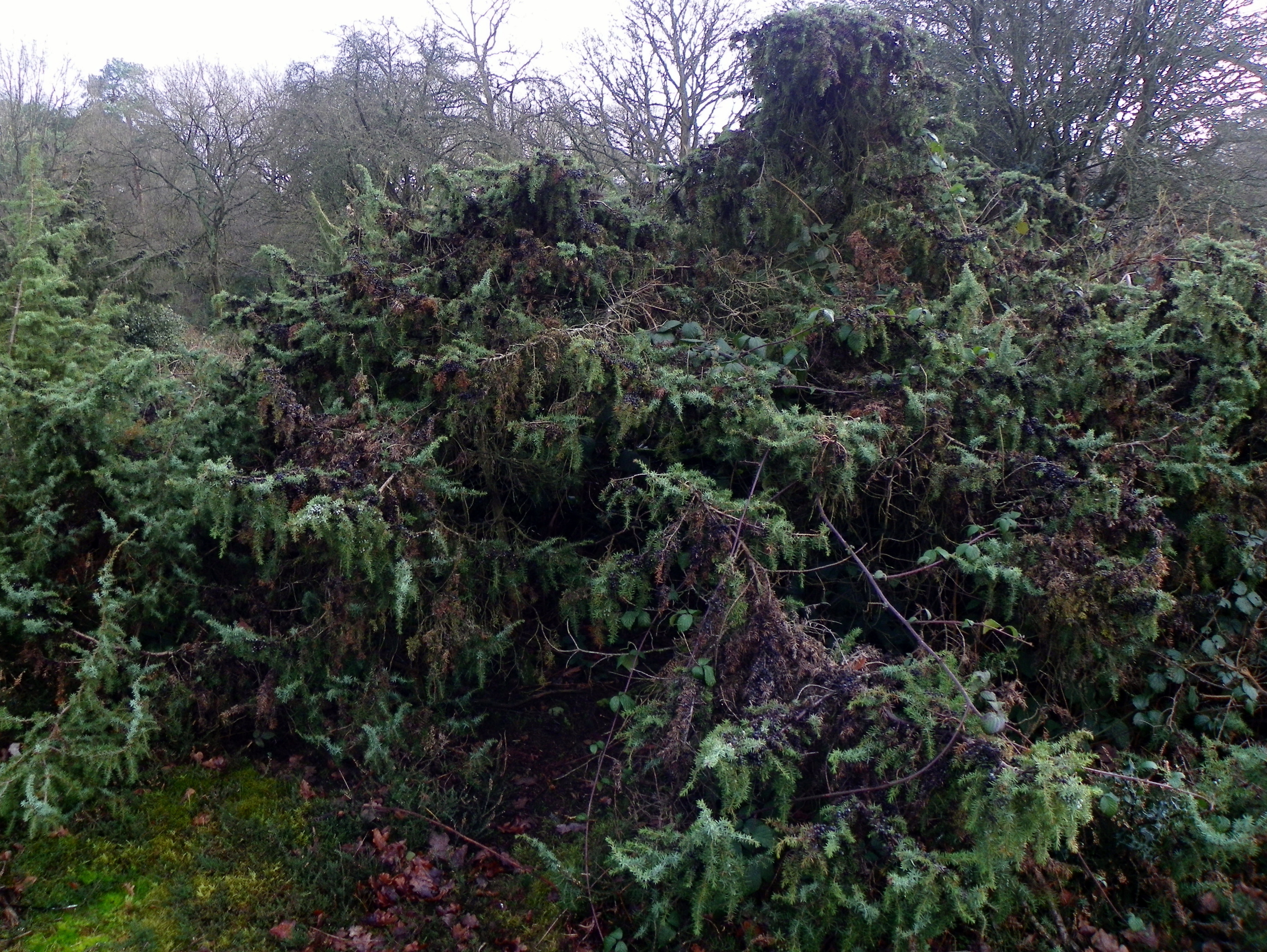
Common juniper (Juniperus communis)

English name	Scientific name	Status
Western redcedar	Thuja plicata	*
Lawson's cypress	Chamaecyparis lawsoniana	*
Sawara cypress	Chamaecyparis pisifera	*
Monterey cypress	Cupressus macrocarpa	*
Common juniper	Juniperus communis	

=== Family Taxaceae (yews) ===
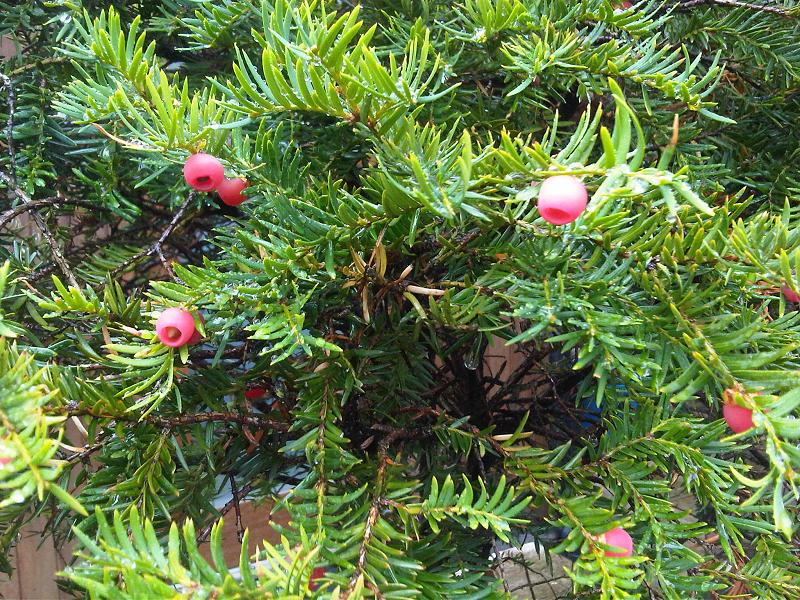
European yew (Taxus baccata)

English name	Scientific name	Status
European yew	Taxus baccata	
