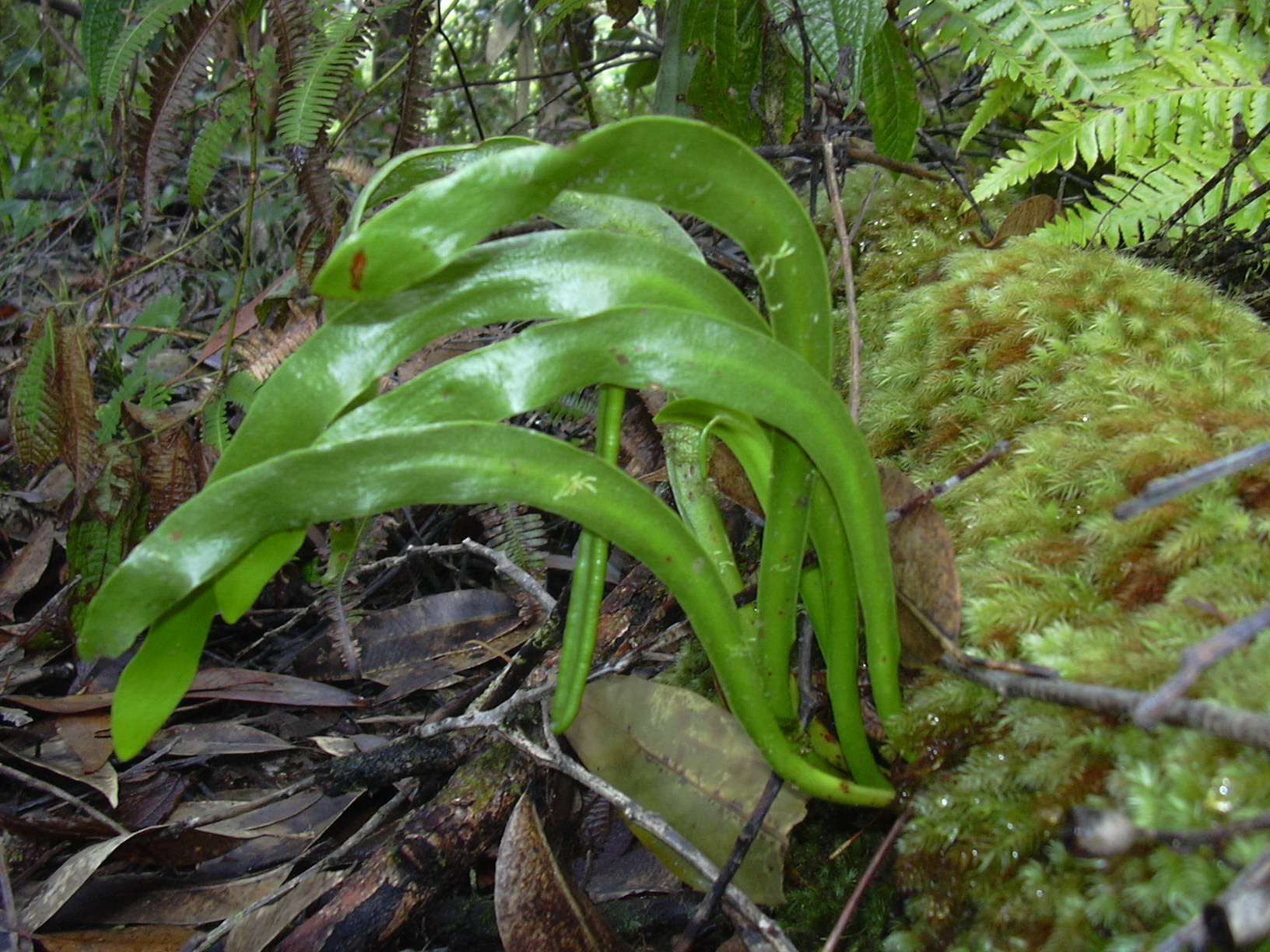

Scientific classification
- Kingdom: Plantae
- Clade: Tracheophytes
- Division: Polypodiophyta
- Class: Polypodiopsida
- Order: Ophioglossales
- Family: Ophioglossaceae
- Genus: Ophioderma
- Species: O. pendulum

Binomial name
- Ophioderma pendulum (L.) C. Presl

Synonyms
- Ophioglossum pendulum L.

= Ophioderma pendulum =

Old-world adder's tongue

Species of fern

Ophioderma pendulum is sometimes known as the old-world adder's-tongue. In Malaysia, it is known as daun rambu. It is a fern in the family Ophioglossaceae, and is the type species of the genus Ophioderma. It is most noteworthy for the length of its pendant fronds, up to 14 ft 9 in (4.5 meters) in length and three inches (8 cm) wide produced at intervals along a tree-clinging rhizome.

Ophioderma pendulum is a common epiphyte in the East Indies.

== Taxonomy ==
Linnaeus was the first to describe this species with the binomial Ophioglossum pendulum in his Species Plantarum of 1753.
