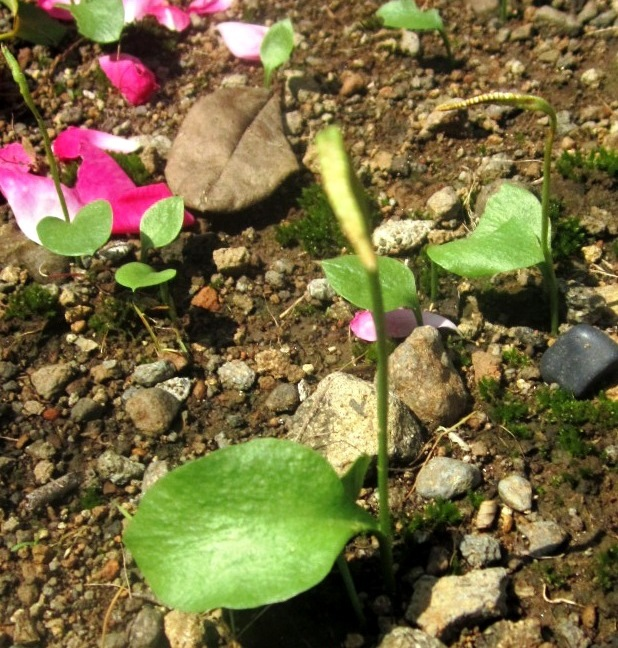
- Habit
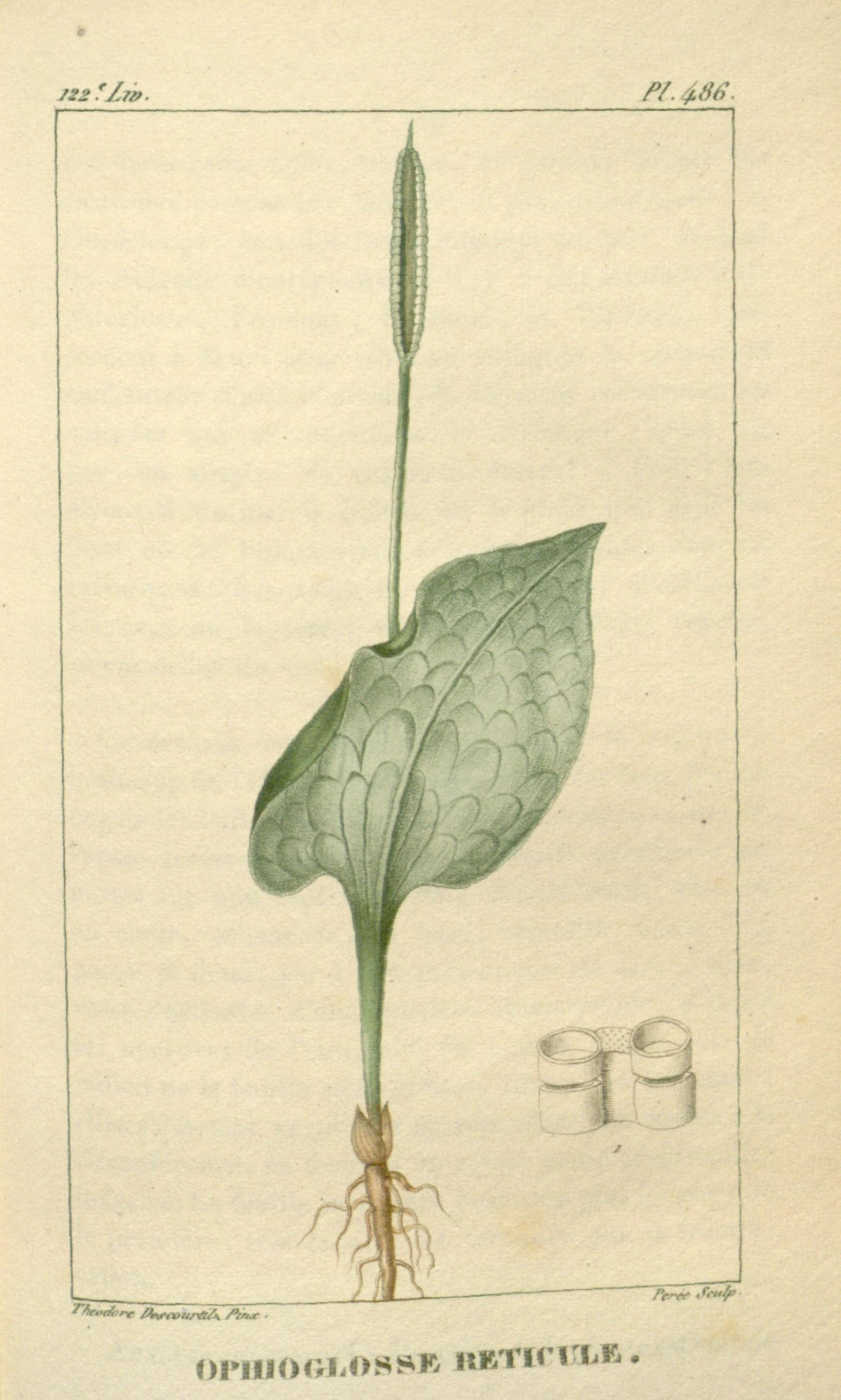
- Botanical illustration

Conservation status
- Least Concern (IUCN 3.1)

Scientific classification
- Kingdom: Plantae
- Clade: Tracheophytes
- Division: Polypodiophyta
- Class: Polypodiopsida
- Order: Ophioglossales
- Family: Ophioglossaceae
- Genus: Ophioglossum
- Species: O. reticulatum

Binomial name
- Ophioglossum reticulatum L.

Synonyms
- List: Ophioglossum aletum M.Patel; Ophioglossum austroasiaticum Nishida; Ophioglossum chaloneri H.K.Goswami; Ophioglossum cognatum C.Presl; Ophioglossum cordifolium Roxb.; Ophioglossum cumingianum C.Presl; Ophioglossum holm-nielsenii B.Øllg.; Ophioglossum moluccanum f. dilatatum Miq.; Ophioglossum obovatum Miq.; Ophioglossum ovatum Bory; Ophioglossum pedunculatum Desv. & Nakai; Ophioglossum peruvianum C.Presl; Ophioglossum raciborskii Alderw.; Ophioglossum ramosii Copel.; Ophioglossum reticulatum var. acutius Christ; Ophioglossum reticulatum f. dilatatum (Miq.) Wieff.; Ophioglossum reticulatum var. polyangium Christ; Ophioglossum timorense Miq.; Ophioglossum usterianum Christ; Ophioglossum vulgatum var. minutum F.M.Bailey; Ophioglossum vulgatum var. reticulatum (L.) D.C.Eaton

= Ophioglossum reticulatum =

Species of fern

Ophioglossum reticulatum, the netted adder's-tongue, is a species of fern in the family Ophioglossaceae. It has a pantropical/pansubtropical distribution; Latin America, the Caribbean, Sub-Saharan Africa, Madagascar, Yemen, South Asia, Southeast Asia, warmer parts of China, Malesia, Korea, Japan, and many tropical islands. It is a hexaploid and has the highest known number of chromosomes of any plant, 720. Its leaves—or leaf, individuals only grow one per year—are edible, and are regularly consumed by people in Africa and Asia.

== Taxonomy ==
Linnaeus described this species as Ophioglossum reticulatum in his Species Plantarum of 1753.
