= Ophioglossum malviae =

Scientific classification
- Kingdom: Plantae
- Clade: Embryophytes
- Clade: Tracheophytes
- Division: Polypodiophyta
- Class: Polypodiopsida
- Order: Ophioglossales
- Family: Ophioglossaceae
- Genus: Ophioglossum
- Species: O. malviae

Binomial name
- Ophioglossum malviae Patel & Reddy

Species of fern

Ophioglossum malviae is a species of fern in the genus Ophioglossum and found in the forests of Ahwa in the Dang District of Gujarat. It is claimed to be the world's smallest land fern, with the entire plant growing to a size of about only 1 to 1.5 cm.
