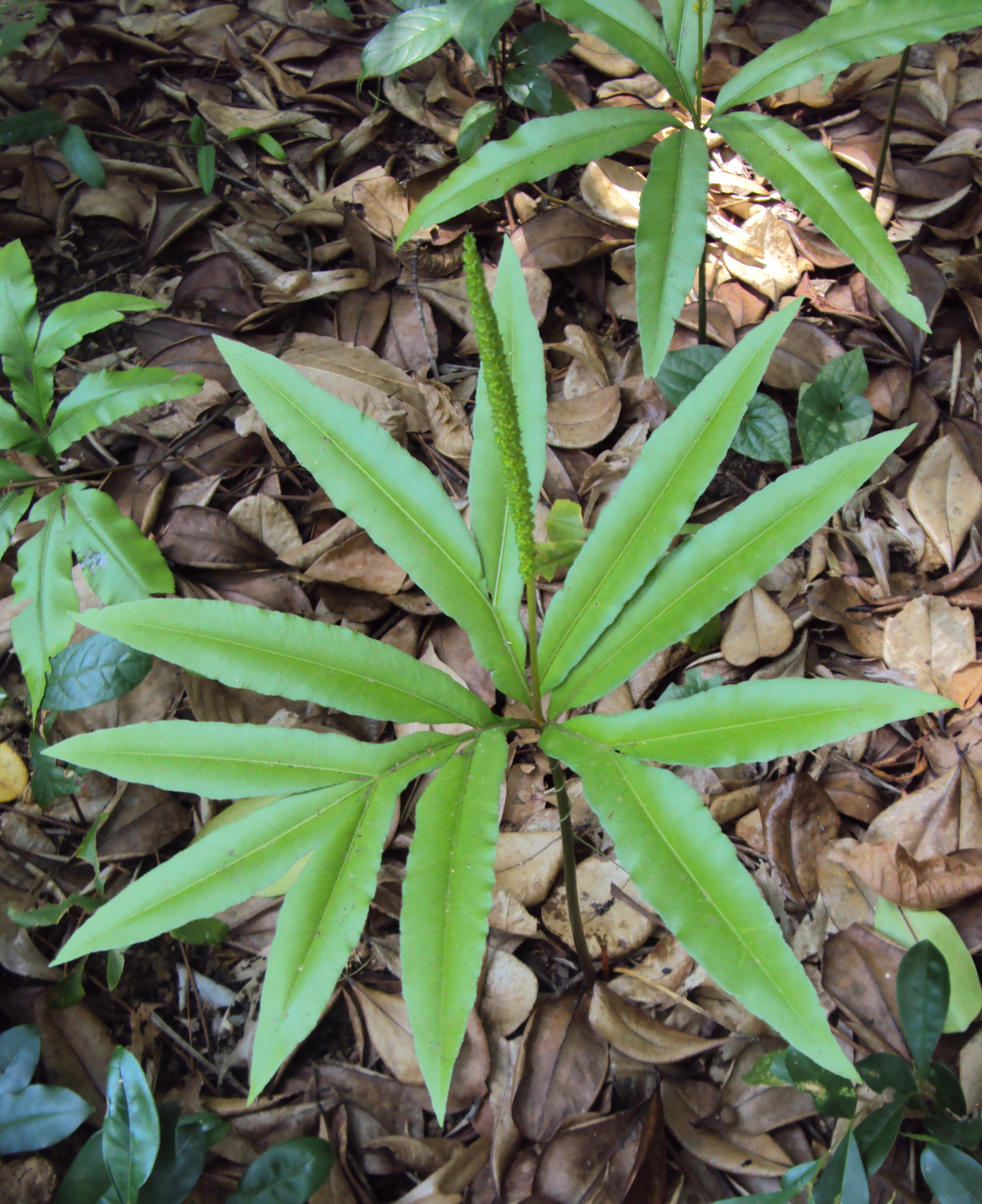

Scientific classification
- Kingdom: Plantae
- Clade: Embryophytes
- Clade: Tracheophytes
- Division: Polypodiophyta
- Class: Polypodiopsida
- Order: Ophioglossales
- Family: Ophioglossaceae
- Genus: Helminthostachys
- Species: H. zeylanica

Binomial name
- Helminthostachys zeylanica (L.) Hook.

Synonyms
- Osmunda zeylanica L.

= Helminthostachys zeylanica =

Species of fern

Helminthostachys zeylanica is a terrestrial, herbaceous fern of southeastern Asia and Australia, commonly known as kamraj and tunjuk-langit. The species is like the other members of its family, it has clusters of sporangia on stems of fertile, spike-like fronds.

The rhizome of this annual plant is short, creeping, underground, and stout. They can bear either a solitary frond or several fronds. Leaves are lanceolate with the margins entire or irregularly serrate.

The frond spike arises from the base of the leaves with its own stipe. Below the spike is a sterile leafy segment (the trophophore). Both it and the sporophore arise from a common petiole.

== Uses ==
The roots of this plant are a popular medicine in China, where they are known as "Di wu gong". The roots are harvested during the wet season in July–August. Only wild plants are harvested. In Malaysia, the leaves are dried and smoked to treat bleeding nose. The plant is eaten as a vegetable and used medicinally for impotence in India. It is known in the Philippines as túkod-langit. Although the basic pharmacology of some of its components suggests it may possess certain antiinflammatory actions, the available scientific literature does not document clinical efficacy.

== Taxonomy ==
Linnaeus was the first to describe this species with the binomial Osmunda zeylanica in his Species Plantarum of 1753.
