= Rosemary Parslow =

British naturalist (1936–2026)

- Born: Rosemary Gault; 26 April 1936; Slough, England
- Died: 23 July 2026 (aged 90)
- Employer: Natural History Museum, London
- Children: Three

Rosemary Parslow (née Gault; 26 April 1936 – 23 July 2026) was a British naturalist and conservationist with an enthusiasm for the Scilly Isles.

== Life ==
Parslow was born in Stroud in 1936 and her parents were Phyllis (born Bold) and Simpson Millar Gault. After her school education she went to work at the Natural History Museum, London.

In 1958 she discovered the Scilly Isles when she went there to ring birds. She was still working at the Natural History Museum where she knew about echinoderms. However in 1960 she lost her position as she had married and she became pregnant and that was outside the conditions of her work. Her former employers continued to support her work in gathering specimens.

There are over 100 Scilly islands and they are all off the western tip of Cornwall. The fern Least adder's–tongue Ophioglossum lusitanicum had been discovered on St Agnes in 1950 and Parslow found an area where this rare fern grew. It is only two centimetres high and it is unknown in the rest of the British Isles with the exception of the Channel Isles. Parslow's three children indulged their mother when they spent Christmas in the Scilly Isles where there she could see Ophioglossum lusitanicum bloom.

In 2010 she published The Isles of Scilly in the New Naturalist series, and in 2017 she and Ian Bennallick published The New Flora of the Isles of Scilly which won a prize.

In 2023, the Wildlife Trust awarded her the Christopher Cadbury Medal that November in recognition of her work on the Isles of Scilly.

Parslow died in 2026.

== Private life ==
Parslow married and divorced three times during her life and she had three children.
