= Cheiroglossa =

Scientific classification
- Kingdom: Plantae
- Clade: Tracheophytes
- Division: Polypodiophyta
- Class: Polypodiopsida
- Order: Ophioglossales
- Family: Ophioglossaceae
- Subfamily: Ophioglossoideae
- Genus: Cheiroglossa; C.Presl

Type species
- Cheiroglossa palmata (L.) Presl

Species
- C. malgassica (C.Chr.) Pic.Serm.; C. palmata (L.) Presl

Genus of ferns

Cheiroglossa is a genus of fern in the family Ophioglossaceae, subfamily Ophioglossoideae, with two species.

== Taxonomy ==
The genus was first described by Carl Borivoj Presl in 1845. He separated it from Ophioglossum in the sense of Linnaeus by its dangling epiphytic habit, simple veins, and the appearance of multiple sporophores at the margin.

The Smith et al. classification of 2006, based on molecular phylogeny, lumped Cheiroglossa within Ophioglossum, in the Ophioglossaceae. The Christenhusz et al. classification of 2011 maintained it as a separate genus within Ophioglossaceae, as did the Pteridophyte Phylogeny Group classification of 2016 (PPG I), while it was returned to the synonymy of Ophioglossum by the Christenhusz and Chase classification of 2014. The PPG I classification additionally assigns it to subfamily Ophioglossoideae, which corresponds to the circumscription of Ophioglossum used in Christenhusz and Chase.

=== Species ===
As of October 2026, the Checklist of Ferns and Lycophytes of the World and World Flora Online recognize two species in Cheiroglossa. Plants of the World Online recognizes these two species in a broadly circumscribed Ophioglossum.

- Cheiroglossa malgassica (C.Chr.) Pic.Serm.
- Cheiroglossa palmata (L.) Presl
