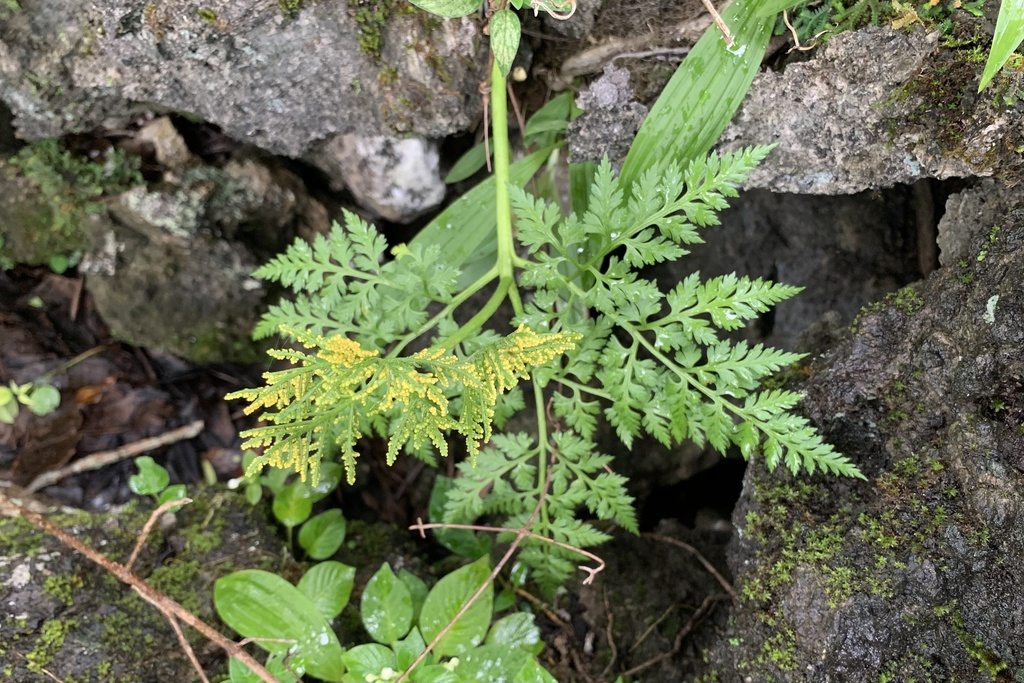

Scientific classification
- Kingdom: Plantae
- Clade: Tracheophytes
- Division: Polypodiophyta
- Class: Polypodiopsida
- Order: Ophioglossales
- Family: Ophioglossaceae
- Subfamily: Botrychioideae
- Genus: Japanobotrychum; Masam.

Type species
- Japanobotrychum arisanense Masam.

Species
- J. chamaeconium (Bitter & Hieronymus 1900 ex Bitter 1900) Nishida 1952 ex Tagawa 1958; J. lanuginosum (Wallich 1828 ex Hooker & Greville 1828) Nishida ex Tagawa 1958

Synonyms
- Botrychium (Japanobotrychum) (Masamune 1931) Kato & Sahashi 1977; Botrychium section Lanuginosae Clausen 1938

= Japanobotrychum =

Genus of ferns

Japanobotrychum is a genus of ferns in the family Ophioglossaceae with the sole species Japanobotrychum lanuginosum. The genus is accepted in the Pteridophyte Phylogeny Group classification of 2016 (PPG I) (under the name "Japanobotrychium"), but not by some other sources.

== Taxonomy ==
The genus Japanobotrychum was first described in 1931 by the Japanese botanist Genkei Masamune, with the only species being Japanobotrychum arisanense. This is now considered to be a synonym of Botrychium lanuginosum Wall. ex Hook. & Grev., first described in 1828, so the epithet lanuginosum has priority over arisanense.

The Smith et al. classification of 2006, based on molecular phylogeny, lumped Japanobotrychum within Botrychium, in the Ophioglossaceae, which was continued in the Christenhusz et al. classification of 2011 and the Christenhusz and Chase classification of 2014. It is recognized as a distinct genus (as Japanobotrychium) in Ophioglossaceae by the Pteridophyte Phylogeny Group classification of 2016 (PPG I).

The Pteridophyte Phylogeny Group classification of 2016 (PPG I) accepts the genus (with the spelling "Japanobotrychium"), with one species, as did the Checklist of Ferns and Lycophytes of the World as of October 2019, whereas Plants of the World Online subsumed the genus into Botrychium.

== Distribution ==
Japanobotrychum lanuginosum is widely distributed, mainly in tropical Asia, being found from West Himalaya and India through southern China and Mainland Southeast Asia to New Guinea.
