= Flora of Great Britain and Ireland =

The flora of Great Britain and Ireland is one of the best documented in the world. There are 1390 native species and over 1100 well-established non-natives documented on the islands. A bibliographic database of the species has been compiled by the Botanical Society of Britain and Ireland. The lists (spread across multiple pages due to size) give an English name and a scientific name for each species, and two symbols are used to indicate status (e for extinct species, and * for introduced species).

- List of the vascular plants of Britain and Ireland (ferns and allies) covers ferns and allies (Lycopodiopsida, Equisetopsida and Pteridopsida)
- List of the vascular plants of Britain and Ireland (conifers) covers the conifers (Pinopsida)

The remaining parts cover the flowering plants (Magnoliopsida):

- List of the vascular plants of Britain and Ireland (dicotyledons)
- List of the vascular plants of Britain and Ireland (Rosaceae), covering the dicotyledon family Rosaceae
- List of the vascular plants of Britain and Ireland (Asteraceae), covering the dicotyledon family Asteraceae
- List of the vascular plants of Britain and Ireland (monocotyledons), covering the monocotyledons (Butomaceae to Orchidaceae)

== See also ==
- Biodiversity in British Overseas Territories
- Flora of Ireland
