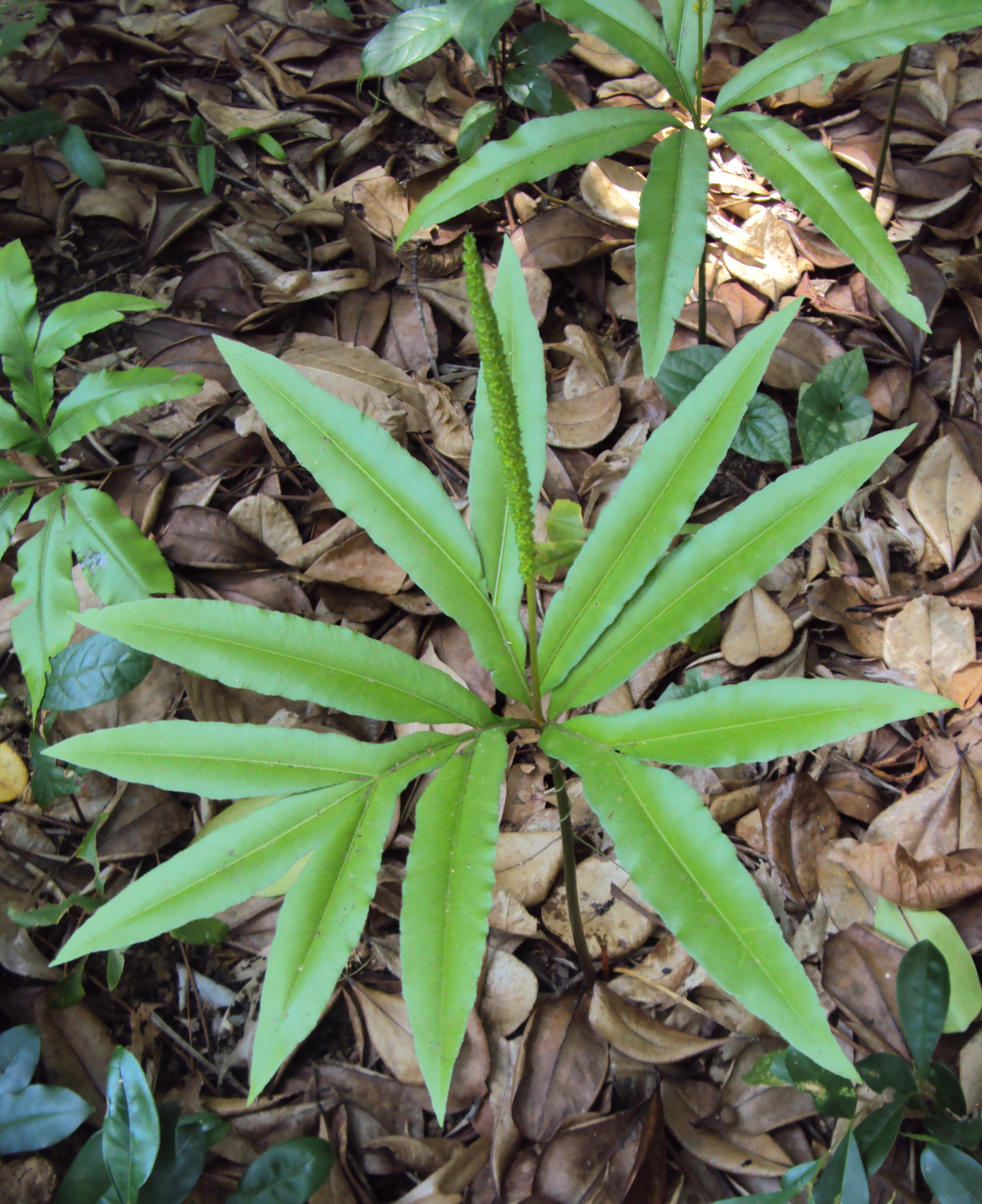
- Helminthostachys zeylanica

Scientific classification
- Kingdom: Plantae
- Clade: Tracheophytes
- Division: Polypodiophyta
- Class: Polypodiopsida
- Order: Ophioglossales
- Family: Ophioglossaceae
- Subfamily: Helminthostachyoideae; C.Presl
- Genus: Helminthostachys; Kaulf. 1824

Type species
- Helminthostachys dulcis Kaulfuss 1822

Species
- †H. halcabadica Fokina 1963; H. zeylanica (L. 1753) Hook. 1824

Synonyms
- Botryopteris C. Presl 1825 non Renault 1875; Ophiala Desv. 1827

= Helminthostachys =

Genus of ferns

Helminthostachys is a fern genus in the Ophioglossaceae (adder's tongue) family. It is widespread throughout southeast Asia and Australia.

== Taxonomy ==
The Smith et al. classification of 2006, based on molecular phylogeny, placed Helminthostachys in Ophioglossaceae. Subsequent classifications have maintained this placement. The PPG I classification assigns it as the sole member of the subfamily Helminthostachyoideae.
