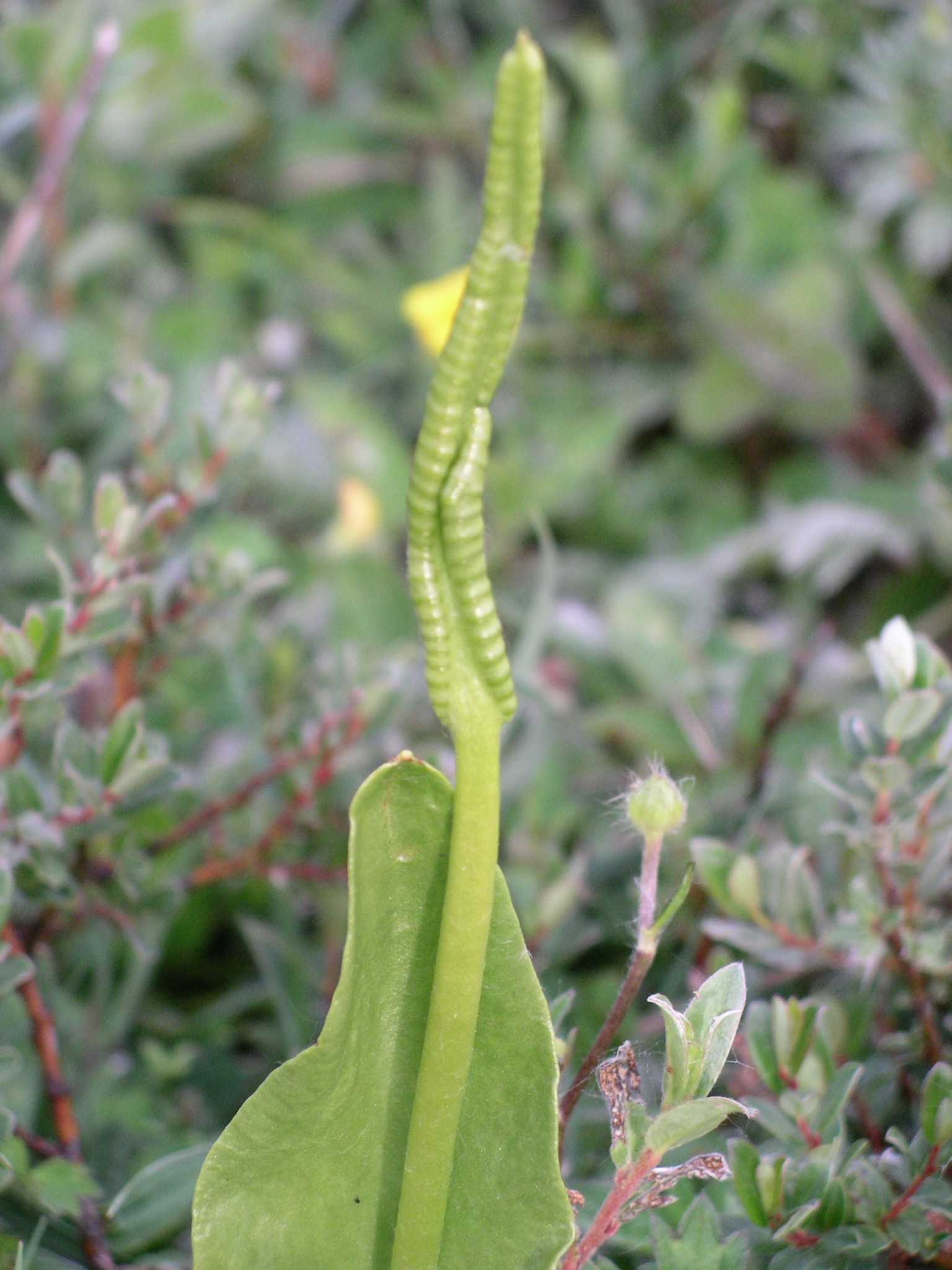
- Ophioglossum vulgatum

Scientific classification
- Kingdom: Plantae
- Clade: Tracheophytes
- Division: Polypodiophyta
- Class: Polypodiopsida
- Order: Ophioglossales
- Family: Ophioglossaceae
- Subfamily: Ophioglossoideae
- Genus: Ophioglossum; L.

Type species
- Ophioglossum vulgatum L.

Species
- See text

Synonyms
- Cassiopteris H.Karst.; Goswamia Li Bing Zhang & Liang Zhang; Haukia Li Bing Zhang & Liang Zhang; †Ophioglossites Massalongo; Rhizoglossum C.Presl; Whittieria Li Bing Zhang & Liang Zhang

= Ophioglossum =

Genus of ferns

Ophioglossum, the adder's-tongue ferns, is a genus of about 50 species of ferns in the family Ophioglossaceae. The genus name comes from Ancient Greek ὄφις (óphis), meaning "snake", and γλῶσσα (glôssa), meaning "tongue". Their cosmopolitan distribution is mainly in tropical and subtropical habitats.

The genus has the largest number of chromosomes in the known plant kingdom, but, contrary to popular belief, does not have more chromosomes than all known organisms, falling short of the protist Sterkiella histriomuscorum.

== Description ==
Adders-tongues are so-called because the spore-bearing stalk is thought to resemble a snake's tongue. Each plant typically sends up a small, undivided leaf blade with netted venation, and the spore stalk forks from the leaf stalk, terminating in sporangia which are partially concealed within a structure with slit sides.

When the leaf blade is present, there is not always a spore stalk present, and the plants do not always send up a leaf, sometimes going for a year to a period of years living only under the soil, nourished by association with soil fungi.

The plant grows from a central, budding, fleshy structure with fleshy, radiating roots.

Ophioglossum malviae is known as the world's smallest terrestrial fern.

== Polyploidy ==
Ophioglossum has a high chromosome count compared with other species, with 120 or up to 720 chromosomes possible in 120-chromosome intervals due to polyploidy (multiple copies of chromosomes). It has almost 1260 chromosomes in the meiocyte (spore mother cell which undergoes meiosis, the reduction division that forms spores with only one set of chromosomes in each spore). The species Ophioglossum reticulatum has the highest number of chromosomes found in any multicellular organism.

== Taxonomy ==
The Smith et al. classification of 2006, based on molecular phylogeny, placed Ophioglossum in Ophioglossaceae. Subsequent classifications have maintained this placement. Circumscriptions of the genus vary. The Christenhusz and Chase classification of 2014 includes Cheiroglossa and Ophioderma within Ophioglossum. This circumscription corresponds to subfamily Ophioglossoideae in the PPG I classification, which recognizes Cheiroglossa, Ophioderma, and Rhizoglossum as separate genera. More recently, it has been proposed to subdivide Ophioglossum more narrowly, removing several species into the new genera Goswamia, Haukia, and Whittieria.

== Phylogeny ==
Phylogeny of Ophioglossum

- Ophioglossum s.l.
  - - - - (Rhizoglossum)
          O. bergianum Schltdl.
      - - Ophioglossum section Aitchisonii
          O. polyphyllum A.Braun (Large adder's tongue)
        - (Whittieria)
          O. engelmannii Prantl (Limestone adder's tongue)
    - - (Goswamia)
        - O. trilokinathii B.L.Yadav, Meghvansi, Meena & Gena
        - - - O. gomezianum Welw. ex A.Braun
            - - O. costatum R.Br
              - O. eliminatum Khand. & Goswamy
          - - O. nudicaule L.fil. (Slender/least adder's tongue)
            - - O. lusoafricanum Welw. ex Prantl
              - - O. lusitanicum L.
                - O. rubellum Welw. ex A.Braun
  - - - (Haukia)
        O. crotalophoroides Walter (Bulbous adder's tongue)
    - - (Kawamurae)
        - O. parvifolium Hook. & Grev.
        - - O. kawamurae Tagawa
          - O. parvum M.Nishida & Kurita
      - (Ophioglossum) s.s.
        - - O. namegatae M.Nishida & Kurita
          - - O. austroasiaticum Nishida
            - O. pusillum Raf. (Northern adder's tongue)
        - - O. lancifolium C.Presl
          - - - O. reticulatum L. (Stalked adder's tongue)
              - - O. coriaceum A.Cunn.
                - O. petiolatum Hook.
            - - - O. gramineum Willd.
                - O. thermale Kom.
              - - O. californicum Prantl (California adder's tongue)
                - O. vulgatum L. (Southern adder's tongue)

Unassigned species:

- (Goswamia)
  - Ophioglossum gujaratensis S.M.Patil et al.
  - Ophioglossum hitkishorei M.Patel & M.N.Reddy
  - Ophioglossum indicum B.L.Yadav & H.K.Goswami
  - Ophioglossum isanensis Petchsri, Li Bing Zhang & Jaruwatt.
  - Ophioglossum malviae M.Patel & M.N.Reddy
  - Ophioglossum raphaelianum Anto et al.
- (Haukia)
  - Ophioglossum opacum R.Br.
  - Ophioglossum tuberosum Hook. & Arn.
- (Ophioglossum) s.s.
  - Ophioglossum ammophilum C.D.Adams – sometimes included in O. gomezianum
  - Ophioglossum azoricum C.Presl
  - Ophioglossum caroticaule J.E.Burrows
  - Ophioglossum convexum J.E.Burrows
  - †Ophioglossum eocenum (Massalongo) Schimper
  - Ophioglossum fernandezianum C.Chr. – doubtful species
  - Ophioglossum × giovanninii Peruzzi, Pierini, Magrini, Marchetti & Viane
  - Ophioglossum gracile J.E.Burrows ex Pocock – may be included in O. gramineum
  - Ophioglossum gracillimum Welw. ex Hook. & Baker
  - †Ophioglossum granulatum Heer
  - Ophioglossum harrisii Underw.
  - Ophioglossum jaykrishnae S.M.Patil, S.K.Patel, Raole & K.S.Rajput – provisionally accepted name
  - Ophioglossum latifolium (Prantl) J.E.Burrows
  - Ophioglossum lineare Schltr. & Brause – possibly a synonym of O. parvifolium
  - Ophioglossum louisii Taton
  - Ophioglossum loureirianum Presl
  - Ophioglossum melipillense J.Rémy
  - Ophioglossum oblongum H.G.Zhou & H.Li
  - †Ophioglossum ornatum Faddeeva
  - Ophioglossum × pierinii Peruzzi, Magrini, Marchetti & Viane
  - Ophioglossum × pseudoazoricum Peruzzi, Pierini, Magrini, Marchetti & Viane
  - Ophioglossum richardsiae Burrows
  - †Ophioglossum senomanicum Chlonova
  - Ophioglossum sandieae J.E.Burrows
  - Ophioglossum scariosum Clausen
  - Ophioglossum thomasii Clausen
  - Ophioglossum yongrenense Ching ex Z.R.He & W.M.Chu
