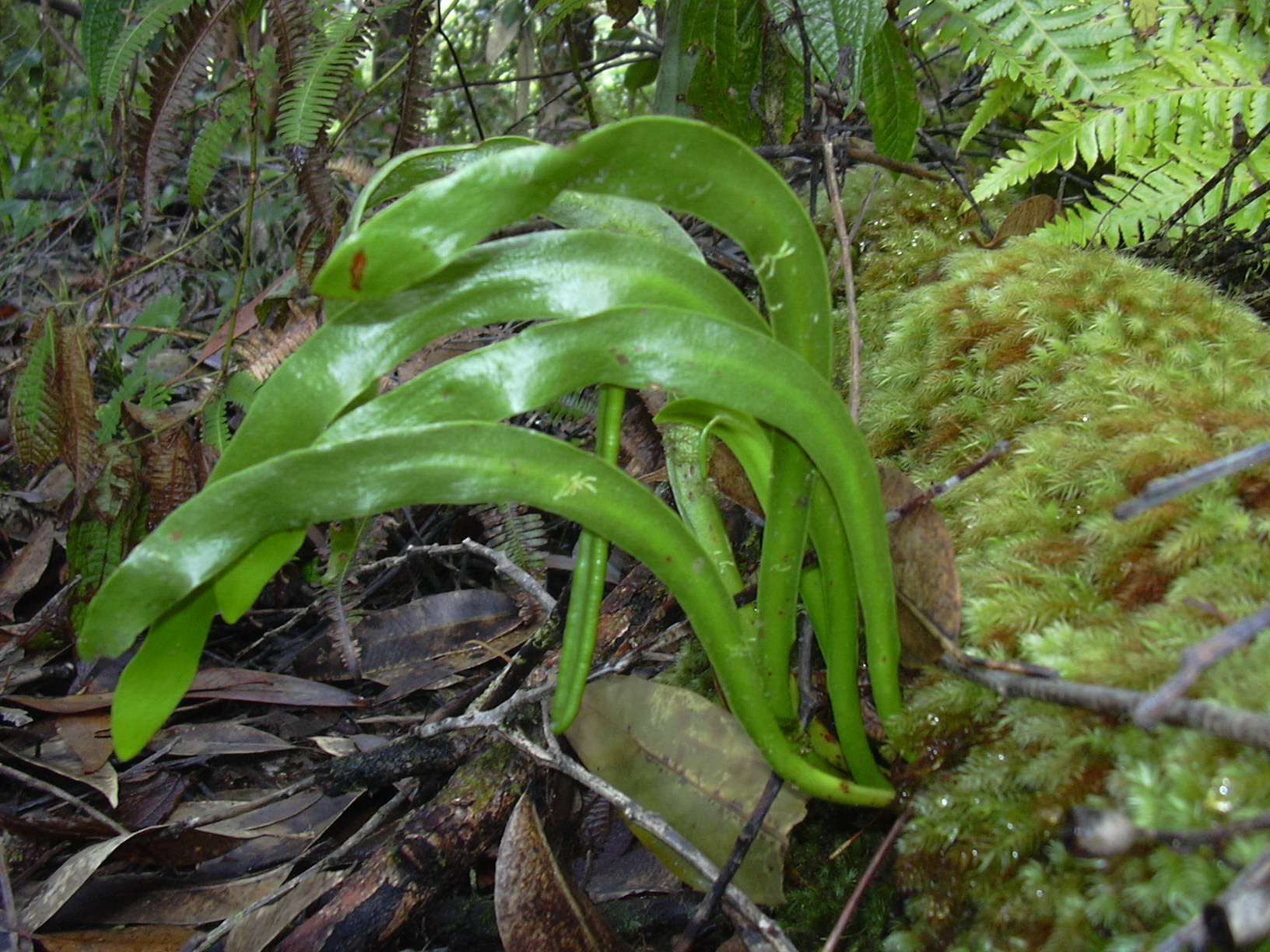
- Ophioderma falcatum growing on a fallen branch

Scientific classification
- Kingdom: Plantae
- Clade: Tracheophytes
- Division: Polypodiophyta
- Class: Polypodiopsida
- Order: Ophioglossales
- Family: Ophioglossaceae
- Subfamily: Ophioglossoideae
- Genus: Ophioderma (Blume) Endl.

Type species
- Ophioderma pendulum (L.) C.Presl

Species
- See text

= Ophioderma (plant) =

Genus of ferns

The genus Ophioderma are distinctive ferns in the family Ophioglossaceae.

== Taxonomy ==
The Smith et al. classification of 2006, based on molecular phylogeny, lumped Ophioderma within Ophioglossum, in the Ophioglossaceae, which was continued in the Christenhusz et al. classification of 2011 and the Christenhusz and Chase classification of 2014. It is recognized as a distinct genus in Ophioglossaceae by the Pteridophyte Phylogeny Group classification of 2016 (PPG I). The PPG I classification additionally assigns it to subfamily Ophioglossoideae, which corresponds to the circumscription of Ophioglossum used in Christenhusz and Chase.

The type species is Ophioderma pendulum.

=== Species ===
As of October 2026, the Checklist of Ferns and Lycophytes of the World and World Flora Online recognize six species in Ophioderma. Plants of the World Online recognizes these six species in a broadly circumscribed Ophioglossum.

- Ophioderma falcatum (C.Presl) O.Deg.
- Ophioderma intermedium (Hook.) M.Nishida
- Ophioderma pendulum (L.) C.Presl
- Ophioderma redactophyllum Chantanaorr. & Li Bing Zhang
- Ophioderma simplex (Ridl. ex Bower) M.Nishida
- Ophiodermia subsessile Amoroso & Coritico

=== Phylogeny ===
The following phylogeny of Ophioderma is based on GenBank plastid data.

- Ophioderma
  - O. pendulum (L.) C.Presl (Old World adder's tongue)
  - - O. falcatum (C.Presl) O.Deg.
    - - O. redactophyllum Chantanaorr. & Li Bing Zhang
      - O. intermedium (Hook.) M.Nishida
