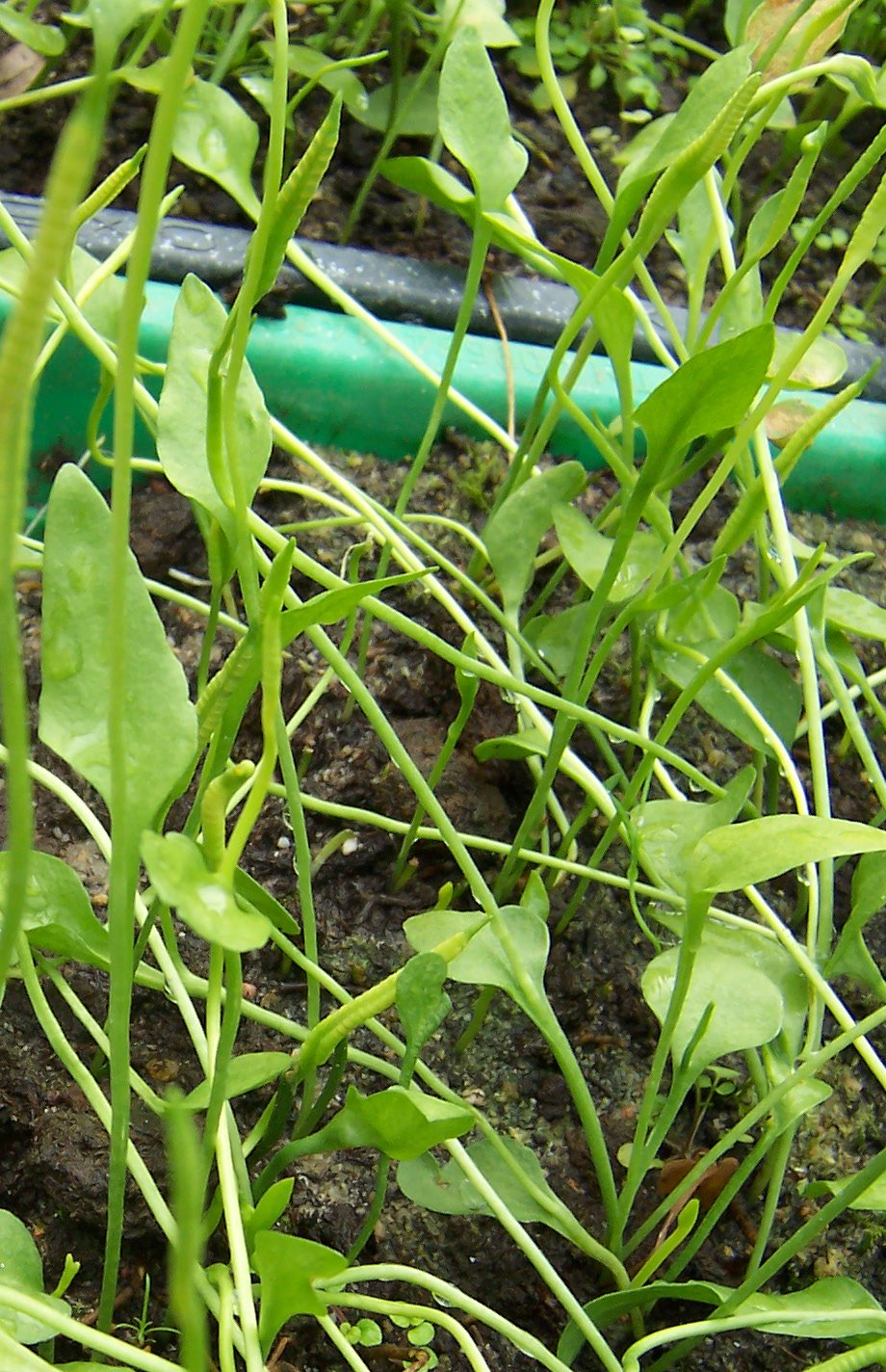

Conservation status
- Least Concern (IUCN 3.1)

Scientific classification
- Kingdom: Plantae
- Clade: Embryophytes
- Clade: Tracheophytes
- Division: Polypodiophyta
- Class: Polypodiopsida
- Order: Ophioglossales
- Family: Ophioglossaceae
- Genus: Ophioglossum
- Species: O. lusitanicum

Binomial name
- Ophioglossum lusitanicum L.

Synonyms
- Ophioglossum braunii Prantl; Ophioglossum loureiroanum C.Presl

= Ophioglossum lusitanicum =

Species of fern

Ophioglossum lusitanicum, the least adder's-tongue, is a small fern of the family Ophioglossaceae. It is a temperate species categorised as least concern by the IUCN (2001).

== Description ==
Ophioglossum lusitanicum is a small winter annual fern, and consists of a simple sterile blade attached to a spike-like fertile blade with between three and eight sunken sporangia on either side. The whole plant rarely exceeds a height of 2 cm (0.8 in).

This species has a chromosome number of 2n = 250–260.

== Distribution ==
Ophioglossum lusitanicum is native to regions bordering the eastern North Atlantic Ocean in Mauritania, Macaronesia (excluding Cape Verde), Morocco, Portugal, France up to the Isles of Scilly and Channel Islands; all countries bordering the Mediterranean; the Caucasus region and has some records in India and Vietnam.

The distribution in Britain is restricted to one small area of coastal heath on St Agnes, Isles of Scilly where it was discovered by John Raven in 1950. It grows in short turf on Wingletang Down where some of the colonies are suffering from an increase of competitive grasses, gorse (Ulex europaeus) and bramble (Rubus fruticosus). Ophioglossum lusitanicum is listed on Schedule 8 of the Wildlife and Countryside Act 1981, and is within a Site of Special Scientific Interest (SSSI). The naturalist Rosemary Parslow was a fan of the fern and she would spend Christmas on St Agnes so she could see the fern. Her daughter joked that she didn't know about plants but she could identify Ophioglossum lusitanicum.

=== Ecology ===
As this species is a winter annual, it requires a warm winter environment. In its British populations, it favours thin, unshaded, peaty soils in south-facing localities.

== Taxonomy ==
Linnaeus was the first to describe least adder's-tongue with the binomial Ophioglossum lusitanicum in his Species Plantarum of 1753.
