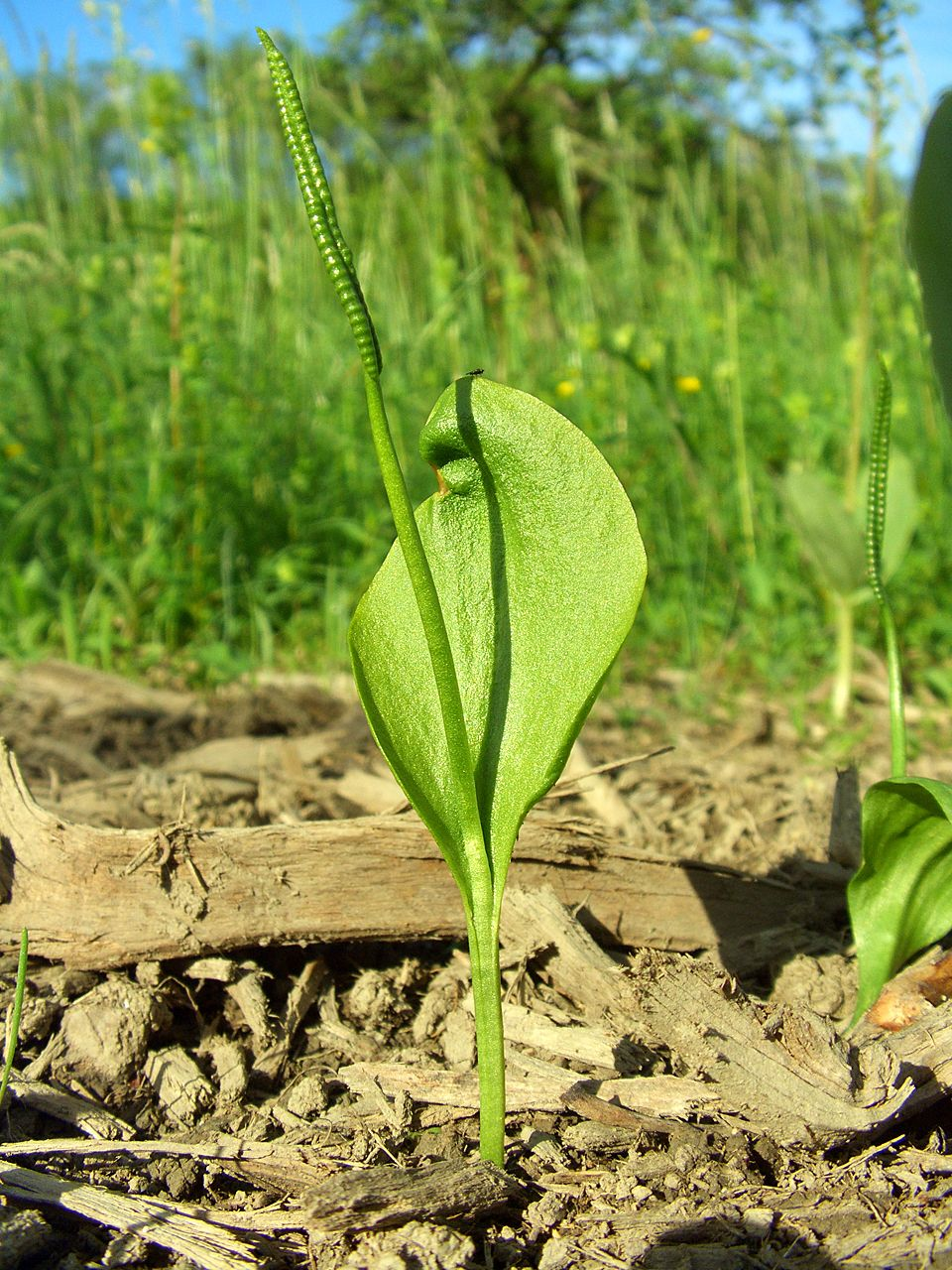

Conservation status
- Secure (NatureServe)

Scientific classification
- Kingdom: Plantae
- Clade: Embryophytes
- Clade: Tracheophytes
- Division: Polypodiophyta
- Class: Polypodiopsida
- Order: Ophioglossales
- Family: Ophioglossaceae
- Genus: Ophioglossum
- Species: O. vulgatum

Binomial name
- Ophioglossum vulgatum L.

= Ophioglossum vulgatum =

Species of fern

Ophioglossum vulgatum, commonly known as adder's-tongue, southern adder's-tongue or adder's-tongue fern, is a species of fern in the family Ophioglossaceae.

The chloroplast genome was reported to have a size of 138,562 base pairs.

== Description ==
In common with other ferns, Ophioglossum vulgatum is a perennial species of vascular plant. The plant grows from a rhizome base to 10–20 cm (3.9–7.9 in) tall (rarely to 30 cm). It consists of a two-part frond, separated into a 4–12 cm (1.6–4.7 in) rounded diamond-shaped leaf sheath and narrow branchless spore-bearing spike. Leaf fronds are ovate in shape and possess smooth toothless lobes. The spike has around 10–40 segments on each side.

== Distribution ==
It is native to many regions with a wide scattered distribution: throughout temperate through tropical Africa and throughout the temperate Northern Hemisphere in Europe, northeastern North America, temperate Asia, and Eurasia.

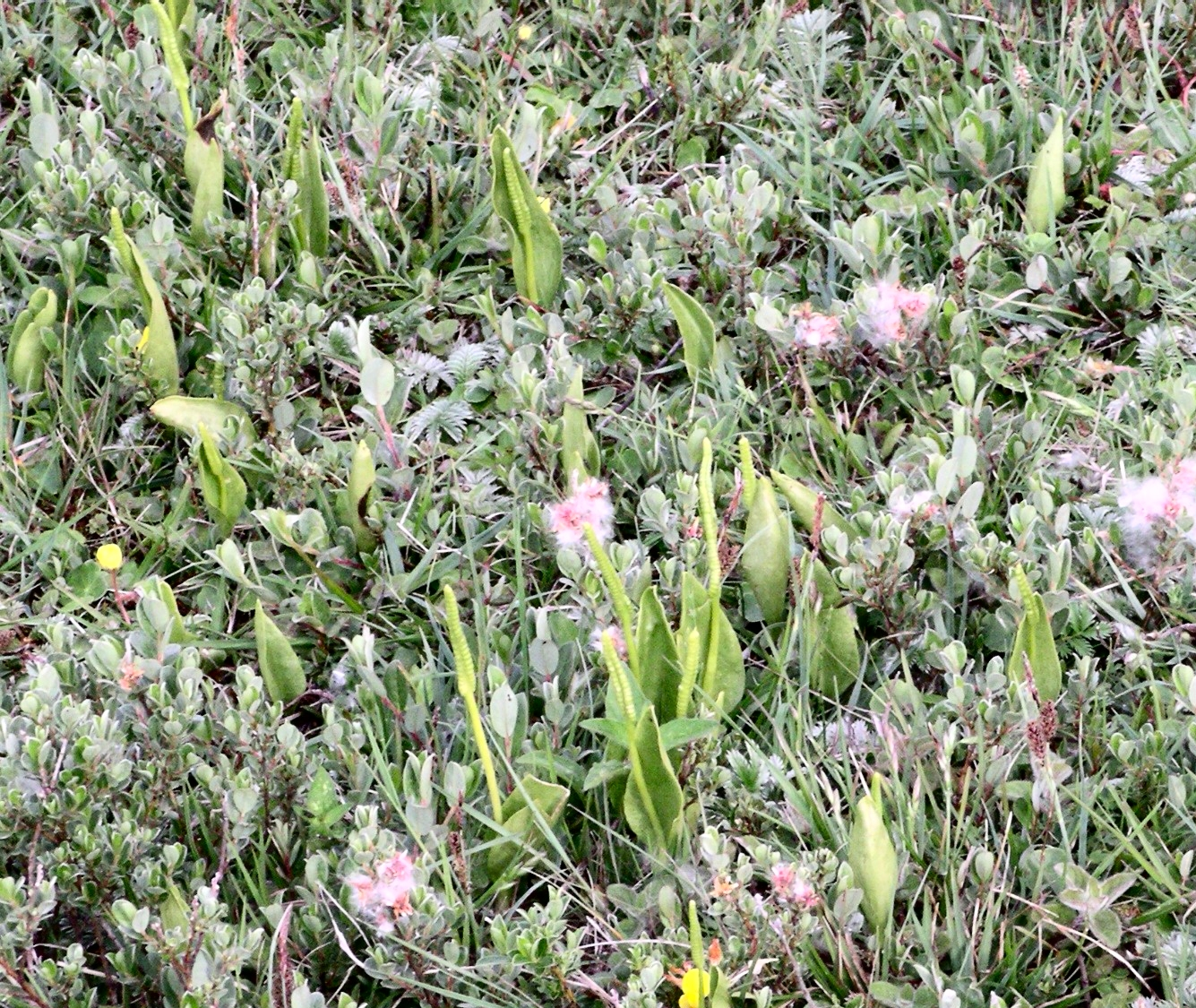
Growing in sand-dunes on Anglesey

== Habitat ==
This small, hard-to-spot plant can occur singly in unimproved pastures, rock crevices and grassy path-sides, but also can occur in colonies of hundreds of plants in sand dunes.

In Finland, it grows on seashores, unlike other parts of the world where it tends to be a calciphile. Finland has suitable lime rich soil habitat sparsely, but the plant has found an equivalent living habitat from Finland's seashores affected by a post-glacial rebound: land just risen from the sea is often quite neutral and contains mineral salts in addition to being open and bare enough.

== Reproduction ==
Ophioglossum vulgatum can reproduce vegetatively through new buds that sprout from the rhizome, which allows the plant to form patches. The plant can also reproduce sexually via spores.

== Rarity ==
This species is rare in most European countries. In Ukraine, there were recorded 280 loci: 152 before 1980, after 1980 – 120, as before and after 1980 – 8 locations.

== Uses ==
Traditional European folk use of leaves and rhizomes as a poultice for wounds. This remedy was sometimes called the "Green Oil of Charity". A tea made from the leaves was used as a traditional European folk remedy for internal bleeding and vomiting.

== Taxonomy ==
Linnaeus described adder's-tongue with the binomial Ophioglossum vulgatum in his Species Plantarum of 1753.
