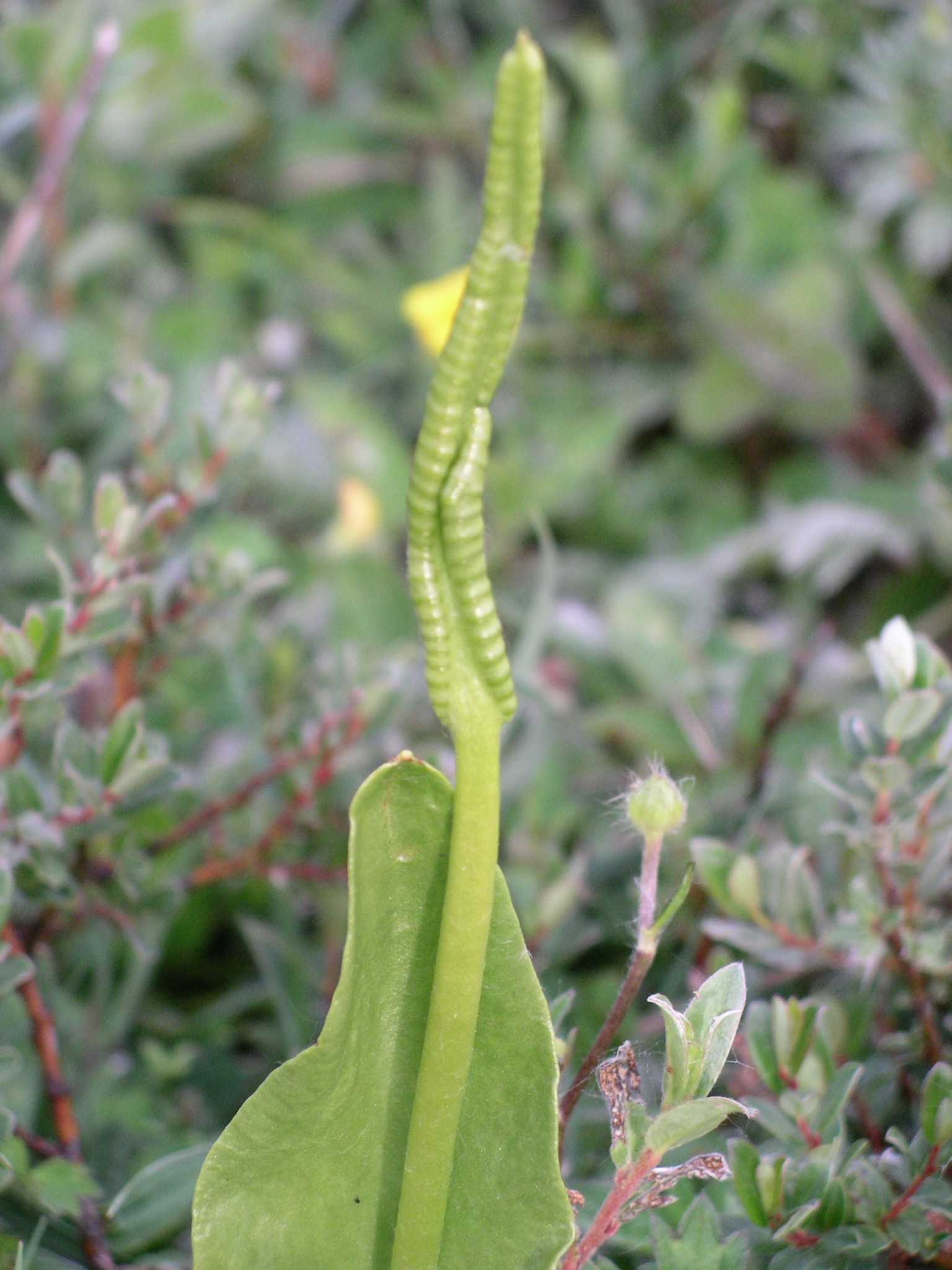
- Ophioglossum vulgatum

Scientific classification
- Kingdom: Plantae
- Clade: Tracheophytes
- Division: Polypodiophyta
- Class: Polypodiopsida
- Subclass: Ophioglossidae
- Order: Ophioglossales; Link
- Family: Ophioglossaceae; Martinov

Genera
- See text

Synonyms
- Botrychiaceae Horaninow 1847; Helminthostachyaceae Ching 1941

= Ophioglossaceae =

Family of ferns

Ophioglossaceae, from Ancient Greek ὄφις (óphis), meaning "snake", and γλῶσσα (glôssa), meaning "tongue", also known as the adder's-tongue family, is a small family of ferns. In the Pteridophyte Phylogeny Group classification of 2016 (PPG I), it is the only family in the order Ophioglossales, which together with the Psilotales is placed in the subclass Ophioglossidae. The Ophioglossidae are one of the groups traditionally known as eusporangiate ferns. Members of the family differ from other ferns in a number of ways. Many have only a single fleshy leaf at a time. Their gametophytes are subterranean and rely on fungi for energy.

== Description ==
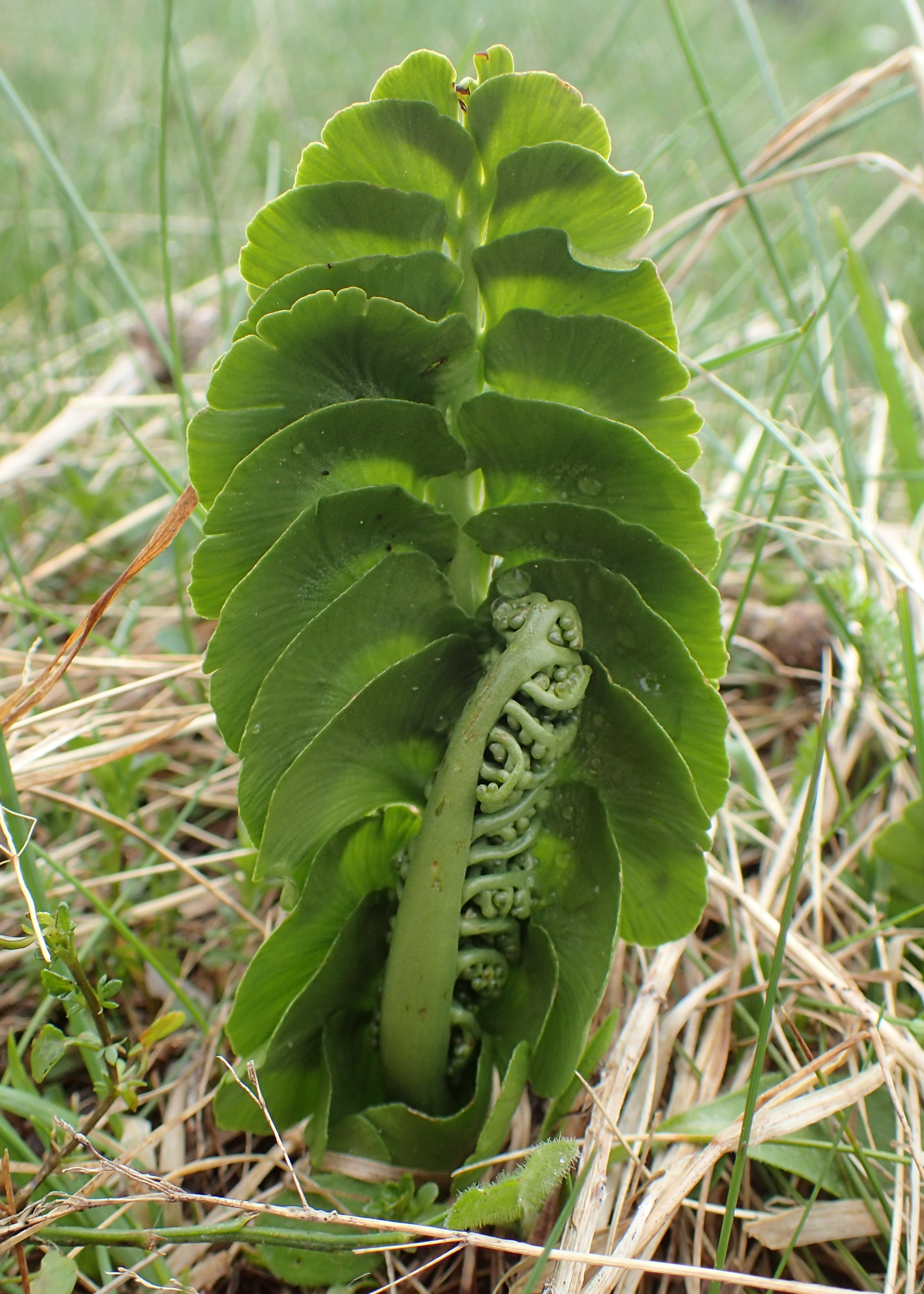
Botrychium lunaria

Members of Ophioglossaceae are usually terrestrial (excepting a few epiphytic species of Ophioglossum) and occur in both temperate and tropical areas.

They differ from the other ferns in several respects:

- Many species only send up one frond or leaf-blade per year, producing only a single leaf at a time. The leaves are usually fleshy, and in temperate areas will often turn brownish or reddish during colder months.
- Instead of the leptosporangia typical of most ferns they produce eusporangia, which are larger, contain more spores, and have thicker walls.
- Their sporophylls (spore-bearing leaves) are divided into two distinct parts, the sporophore, which produces sporangia and has a greatly reduced and modified blade, and the rest of the leaf, the trophophore.
- Their gametophytes are subterranean and rely on fungi for their energy (in other words, they are myco-heterotrophic), unlike the terrestrial, photosynthetic gametophytes found in most ferns.

In addition to having mycoheterotrophic gametophytes, there are a few members of Botrychium that are unique among ferns in having the sporophytes also mycoheterotrophic, producing only small, ephemeral sporophylls that do not photosynthesize.

Botrychium and Helminthostachys are also the only known ferns with secondary growth, even if it is very limited.

The plants have short-lived spores formed in sporangia lacking an annulus, and borne on a stalk that splits from the leaf blade; and fleshy roots. A few species send up fertile spikes only, without any conventional leaf-blade. The spores will not germinate if exposed to sunlight, and the gametophyte can live some two decades without forming a sporophyte.

The genus Ophioglossum has the highest chromosome counts of any known plant. The record holder is Ophioglossum reticulatum, with about 630 pairs of chromosomes (1260 chromosomes per cell). Other measurements have indicated a chromosome number up to 1440 (n = 720). For comparison, humans have 46 chromosomes, consisting of n = 23 pairs.

Ophioglossum malviae from the Western Ghats in India has been characterized as the world's smallest terrestrial pteridophyte with plants typically 1–1.2 cm in size.

== Taxonomy ==
=== History of classification ===
The ferns in this group were originally treated as a family and later as the separate order Ophioglossales. In some classifications, they were placed in a separate division, Ophioglossophyta, but molecular phylogenetic studies have shown the Ophioglossales to be closely related to the Psilotales, and both are placed in the class Ophioglossidae.

In the molecular phylogenetic classification of Smith et al. in 2006, Ophioglossales, in its present circumscription, was placed in the class Psilotopsida, along with the order Psilotales. The linear sequence of Christenhusz et al. (2011), intended for compatibility with the classification of Chase and Reveal (2009), which placed all land plants in Equisetopsida, made it a member of subclass Ophioglossidae, equivalent to Smith's Psilotopsida. This approach has subsequently been followed in the classifications of Christenhusz and Chase (2014) and PPG I (2016).

Older treatments recognized segregate families within the Ophioglossales, such as Botrychiaceae for the moonworts and grape ferns and Helminthostachyaceae for Helminthostachys, but modern treatments combine all members of the order into the single family Ophioglossaceae.

=== Subfamilies and genera ===
Phylogeny of Ophioglossaceae

- - - Mankyuoideae
      Mankyua
  - - - Ophioglossoideae
        - - Cheiroglossa
          - Ophioderma
        - Ophioglossum
    - - Helminthostachyoideae
        Helminthostachys
      - Botrychioideae
        - Sahashia
        - - Botrypus
          - - - Japanobotrychum
              - Sceptridium
            - Botrychium

Phylogeny of Ophioglossaceae

- - - Mankyuoideae
      Mankyua
  - - - Ophioglossoideae
        - - Cheiroglossa
          - Ophioderma
        - Ophioglossum s.l.
    - - Helminthostachyoideae
        Helminthostachys
      - Botrychioideae
        - Sahashia
        - - Botrypus
          - - - Sceptridium rugulosum
              - - Japanobotrychum
                - Sceptridium
            - Botrychium

The number of genera into which the family is divided has varied. The Smith system of 2006 used four genera, treating Botrychium and Ophioglossum broadly. Cheiroglossa has been segregated from Ophioglossum, or included within it. The PPG I system of 2016 divides the family into four subfamilies:

- Mankyuoideae J.R.Grant & B.Dauphin
  - Mankyua B.Y.Sun, M.H.Kim & C.H.Kim
- Ophioglossoideae C.Presl (equivalent to Ophioglossum s.l. in other systems)
  - Cheiroglossa C.Presl
  - Ophioderma (Blume) Endl.
  - Ophioglossum L.
- Helminthostachyoideae C.Presl
  - Helminthostachys Kaulf.
- Botrychioideae C.Presl (equivalent to Botrychium s.l. in other systems)
  - Botrychium Sw.
  - Botrypus Michx.
  - Japanobotrychum Masam.
  - Sahashia Li Bing Zhang & Liang Zhang
  - Sceptridium Lyon
