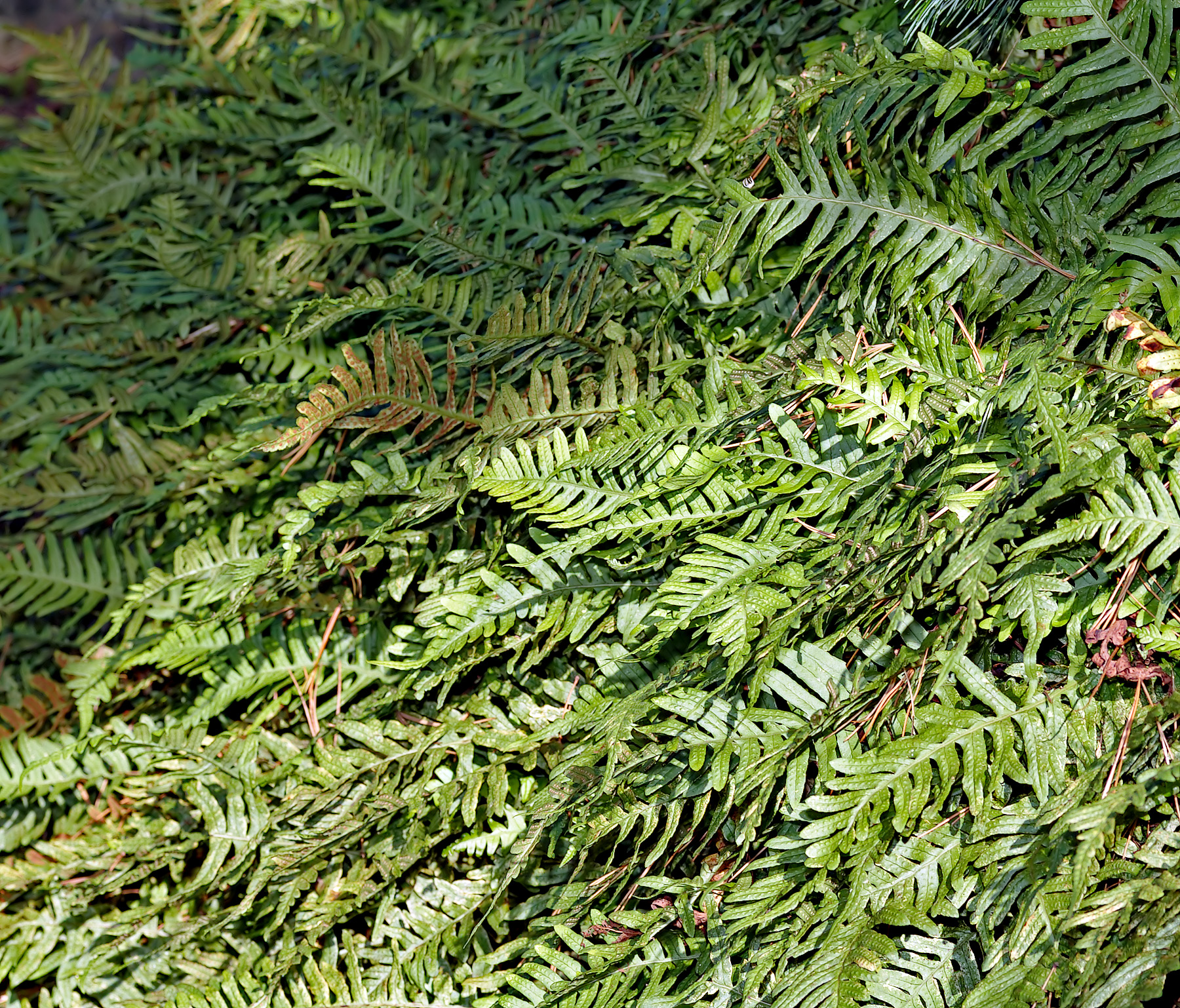
- Common polypody, Polypodium vulgare

Scientific classification
- Kingdom: Plantae
- Clade: Embryophytes
- Clade: Tracheophytes
- Division: Polypodiophyta
- Class: Polypodiopsida
- Order: Polypodiales
- Suborder: Polypodiineae
- Family: Polypodiaceae
- Subfamily: Polypodioideae
- Genus: Polypodium; L.

Species
- See text.

Synonyms
- Ctenopteris Newman 1851; Micropteris J.Sm. 1875

= Polypodium =

Genus of ferns

Polypodium is a genus of ferns in the family Polypodiaceae, subfamily Polypodioideae, according to the Pteridophyte Phylogeny Group classification of 2016 (PPG I). The genus is widely distributed throughout the world, with the highest species diversity in the tropics. The name is derived from Ancient Greek poly ("many") + podion ("little foot"), on account of the foot-like appearance of the rhizome and its branches. They are commonly called polypodies or rockcap ferns, but for many species unique vernacular names exist.

They are terrestrial or epiphytic ferns, with a creeping, densely hairy or scaly rhizome bearing fronds at intervals along its length. The species differ in size and general appearance and in the character of the fronds, which are evergreen, persisting for 1–2 years, pinnate or pinnatifid (rarely simple entire), and from 10 to 80 cm or more long. The sori or groups of spore-cases (sporangia) are borne on the back of the frond; they are globose and naked, not covered with a membrane (indusium).

Polypodies have some use in herbalism, but are today most important in horticulture where several species, hybrids, and their cultivars like Polypodium 'Green Wave' are commonly used as ornamental plants for shady locations. Polypodium have a bitter-sweet taste and are among the rather few ferns that are used in cooking; in this case as a spice e.g. for nougat.

== Species ==
Several of the species form hybrids with other species in the genus; these may often be distinguished by being sterile, with very small "blind" sori. As of April 2025, Checklist of Ferns and Lycophytes of the World accepted the following forty-seven species and eight hybrids:

Image	Scientific name	Distribution
	Polypodium abitaguae Hook.	Ecuador
	Polypodium aequale Maxon	Mexico (Guerrero, Chiapas)
	Polypodium alavae A.R.Sm.	Mexico to Honduras
	Polypodium amorphum Suksd. – irregular polypody	SW. British Columbia to N. Oregon.
	Polypodium appalachianum Haufler & Windham – Appalachian polypody or Appalachian rockcap fern	E. Canada to E. U.S.
	Polypodium arcanum Maxon	Mexico
	Polypodium × aztecum Windham & Yatsk. (P. calirhiza × P. hesperium)	Arizona
	Polypodium californicum Kaulf. – California polypody	California to N. Mexico, Guadalupe, Revillagigedos Islands
	Polypodium calirhiza S.A.Whitmore & A.R.Sm.	Oregon to Mexico
	Polypodium cambricum L. – southern polypody, limestone polypody, or Welsh polypody	NW. Europe to Medit. and Caucasus
	Polypodium castaneum Maxon ex Tejero	Guatemala
	Polypodium chionolepis Sodiro	Ecuador
	Polypodium chirripoense Lellinger	Costa Rica
	Polypodium christensenii Maxon	Mexico (Chiapas) to Guatemala
	Polypodium colpodes Kunze	Mexico to Venezuela
	Polypodium conterminans Liebm.	Mexico to Honduras
	Polypodium diplotrichum Mickel & Beitel	Mexico (Oaxaca, Chiapas)
	Polypodium eatonii Baker	Central & S. Mexico
	Polypodium echinolepis Fée	Mexico to Colombia
	Polypodium × encumeadense (Neuroth, Jäger & Bennert) F.J.Rumsey, Carine & Robba (P. macaronesicum × P. vulgare.)	Madeira
	Polypodium ensiforme Thunb.	Cape Provinces
	Polypodium eperopeutes Mickel & Beitel	Mexico (Veracruz, Oaxaca, Chiapas)
	Polypodium exsul Mett. ex Kuhn	SE. Brazil.
	Polypodium fauriei Christ	Korea (Jeju-do), SW. Sakhalin, S. Kuril Islands to Japan.
	Polypodium fissidens Maxon	Mexico (Oaxaca, Chiapas) to Honduras
	Polypodium flagellare Christ	Costa Rica to Panama, Guianas to Brazil (Pará)
	Polypodium × font-queri Rothm. (P. cambricum × P. vulgare)	Europe
	Polypodium fraternum Schltdl. & Cham.	Mexico to Colombia.
	Polypodium glycyrrhiza D.C.Eaton licorice fern, many-footed fern, and sweet root	Kamchatka, Aleutian Islands to NW. U.S.
	Polypodium hesperium Maxon – western polypody	W. Canada to N. Mexico
	Polypodium hispidulum Bartlett	Mexico (Veracruz, Oaxaca, Chiapas) to Nicaragua
	Polypodium × incognitum Cusick (P. appalachianum × P. virginianum)	E. Canada to NE. U.S.
	Polypodium interjectum Shivas	Madeira, Europe to Iran
	Polypodium iranicum Mazooji	Iran
	Polypodium kamelinii Shmakov	S. Russian Far East
	Polypodium macaronesicum Bobrov	Macaronesia, Spain (Cádiz).
	Polypodium × mantoniae Rothm. (P. interjectum × P. vulgare)	Europe to Türkiye
	Polypodium martensii Mett.	Mexico
	Polypodium moritzianum Link	NW. & N. Venezuela
	Polypodium oxylepis C.Chr.	SE. Brazil
	Polypodium pellucidum Kaulf.	Hawaiian Islands
	Polypodium plesiosorum Kunze	Mexico to NW. Colombia
	Polypodium praetermissum Mickel & Tejero	N. & W. Mexico
	Polypodium puberulum Schltdl. & Cham.	Mexico to Honduras
	Polypodium rhodopleuron Kunze	Mexico to Central America
	Polypodium ryanii Kaulf.	Montserrat
	Polypodium saximontanum Windham	W. Central U.S.
	Polypodium scouleri Hook. & Grev. – leathery polypody, Scouler's polypody, coast polypody, and leather-leaf fern	British Columbia to California
	Polypodium × shivasiae Rothm. (P. cambricum × P. interjectum. )	Europe to NW. Türkiye
	Polypodium sibiricum Sipliv.	Siberia to N. & Central Japan and N. China, Subarctic America to W. & Central Canada
	Polypodium subpetiolatum Hook.	Mexico to Central America, Cuba
	Polypodium × vianei Shmakov (P. sibiricum × P. vulgare.)	SW. Siberia
	Polypodium virginianum L. – rock polypody, rock cap fern, or common polypody	Subarctic America to U.S.
	Polypodium vulgare L. – common polypody	Madeira, Morocco, Temp. Eurasia, S. Africa, Kerguelen Islands

A number of species formerly included in the genus have recently been transferred to other genera, including Campyloneurum, Cyathea, Microgramma, Nephrolepis, Pecluma, Phlebodium, Pleopeltis and Serpocaulon. Species placed elsewhere include:

- Polypodium argyrolepis = Serpocaulon lasiopus
- Polypodium mindense = Serpocaulon eleutherophlebium
- Polypodium mixtum = Pleopeltis murora
- Polypodium piligerum = Moranopteris achilleifolia
- Polypodium punctatum Thunb. ex Murray = Hypolepis punctata
- Polypodium quitense = Pecluma dulcis
- Polypodium rimbachii = Serpocaulon sessilifolium
- Polypodium scutulatum = Serpocaulon fraxinifolium
