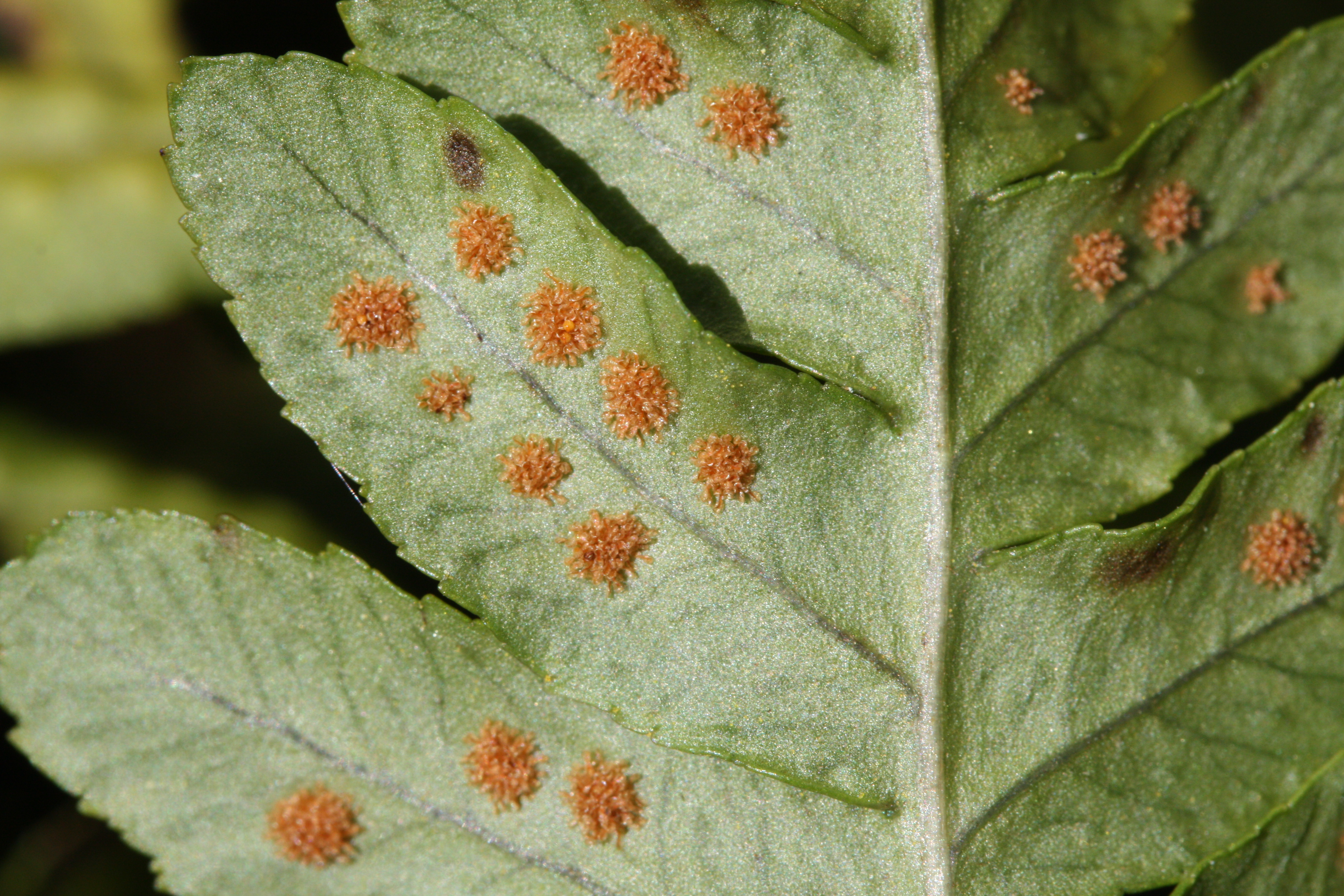

Conservation status
- Secure (NatureServe)

Scientific classification
- Kingdom: Plantae
- Clade: Embryophytes
- Clade: Tracheophytes
- Division: Polypodiophyta
- Class: Polypodiopsida
- Order: Polypodiales
- Suborder: Polypodiineae
- Family: Polypodiaceae
- Genus: Polypodium
- Species: P. hesperium

Binomial name
- Polypodium hesperium Maxon

Synonyms
- Polypodium vulgare var. hesperium (Maxon) A.Nelson & J.F.Macbr.

= Polypodium hesperium =

Species of fern

Polypodium hesperium is a species of fern known by the common name western polypody. It is native to western North America from British Columbia to California, and the Rocky Mountains to northern Mexico, where it grows in rocky habitat types.

This is an allopolyploid species of hybrid origin, its parent species being Polypodium glycyrrhiza and Polypodium amorphum.

== Description ==
This polypody anchors with a thin, scaly rhizome. It produces oblong leaves 25 to 35 centimetres (9.8 to 13.8 in) in maximum length and 7 cm (2.8 in) in width. Each leaf is made up of many dull-pointed linear or lance-shaped segments which may be thin and membranous or firm and leathery in texture, and smooth or serrated on the edges. The underside of each leaf segment has a few brownish, reddish, or nearly black sori, which contain the spores.
