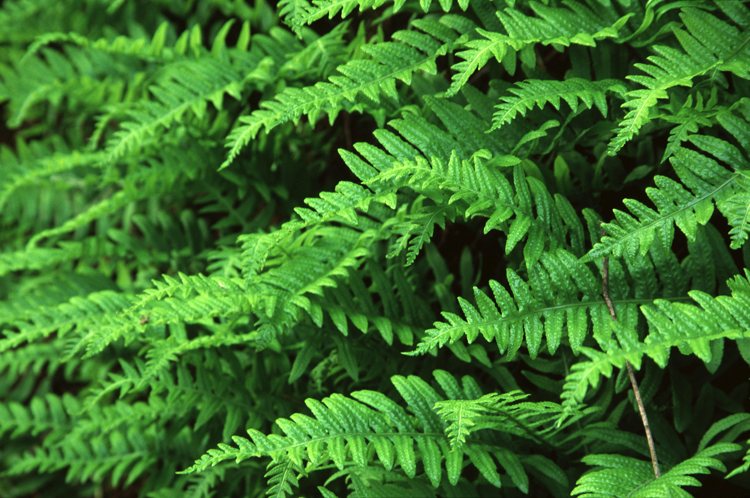

Conservation status
- Apparently Secure (NatureServe)

Scientific classification
- Kingdom: Plantae
- Clade: Embryophytes
- Clade: Tracheophytes
- Division: Polypodiophyta
- Class: Polypodiopsida
- Order: Polypodiales
- Suborder: Polypodiineae
- Family: Polypodiaceae
- Genus: Polypodium
- Species: P. calirhiza

Binomial name
- Polypodium calirhiza S.A.Whitmore & A.R.Sm.

= Polypodium calirhiza =

Species of fern

Polypodium calirhiza is a species of fern in the polypody family. Its common names include nested polypody and habit polypody. It is found in California and Oregon in the U.S., and several states of Mexico: Colima, Jalisco, Mexico State, Oaxaca, and Veracruz. The leaflets on each leaf are broad and oval-shaped, coming to a dull point. This fern is sometimes epiphytic.

The name of this species is a conflation of Polypodium californicum and Polypodium glycyrrhiza, because this species arose as a hybrid between those two species. It was not recognized as a separate species until 1991.

In the California Coast Ranges P. calirhiza occurs in a number of habitats including California oak woodlands and exposed rocky outcrops. In such oak woodlands it is often found in understory alliances with such species as the fern Pellaea andromedifolia and the fungus Tremella mesenterica.
