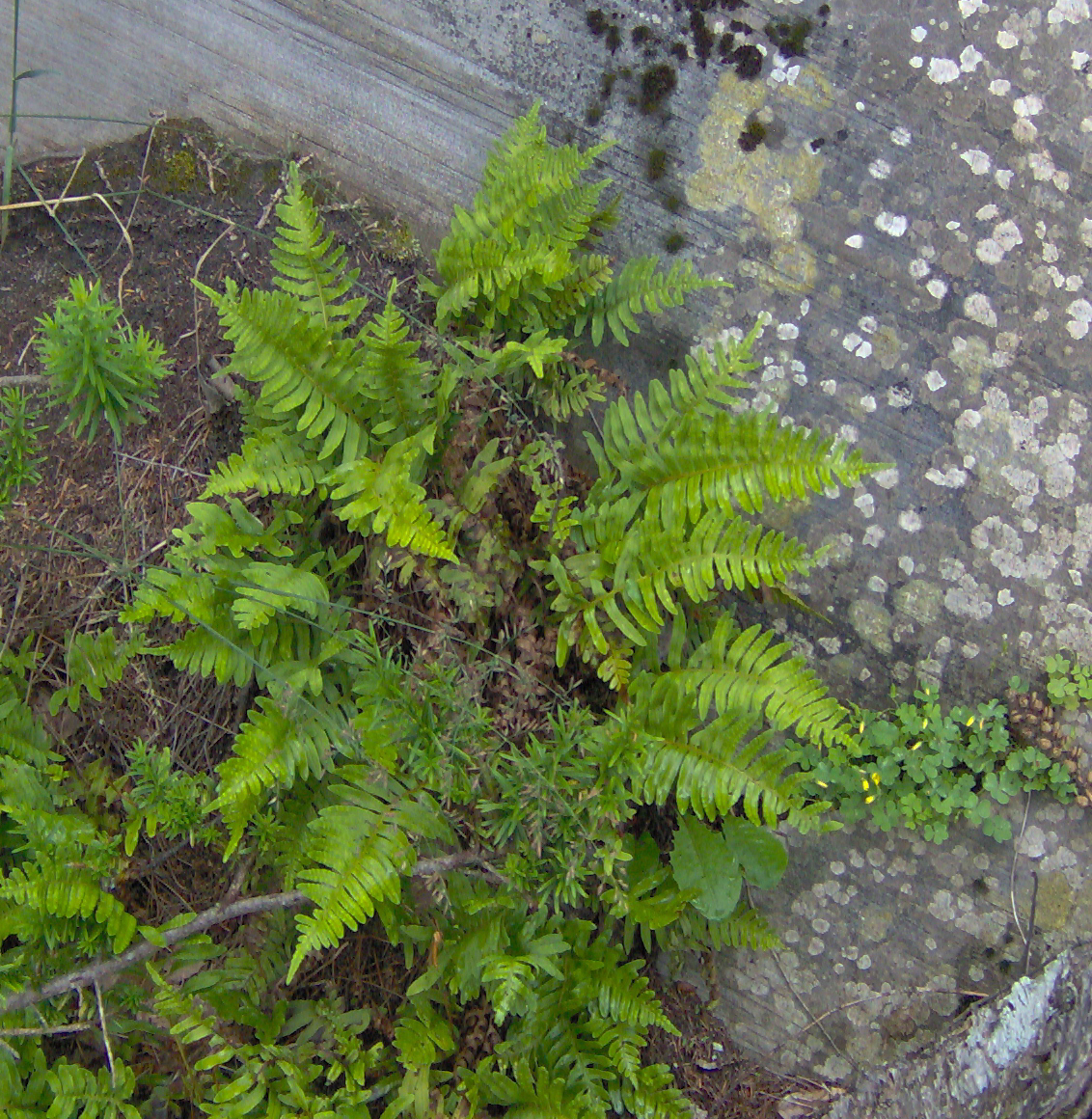
- Polypodium appalachianum

Scientific classification
- Kingdom: Plantae
- Clade: Embryophytes
- Clade: Tracheophytes
- Division: Polypodiophyta
- Class: Polypodiopsida
- Order: Polypodiales
- Suborder: Polypodiineae
- Family: Polypodiaceae
- Genus: Polypodium
- Species: P. appalachianum

Binomial name
- Polypodium appalachianum Haufler & Windham

= Polypodium appalachianum =

Appalachian rockcap fern

Species of fern

Polypodium appalachianum is a fern species native to eastern North America. Sometimes called the Appalachian polypody or Appalachian rockcap fern, it is very similar in appearance to Polypodium virginianum. For years, P. virginianum—long considered a variety of the British Polypodium vulgare—was recognized as having cryptic races, with diploid, triploid, and tetraploid representatives. Since the triploid specimens bore abortive spores, it was apparently the hybrid between the diploid and tetraploid groups. In 1991, it was resolved that the type of P. virginianum was the tetraploid series, and that it is an allotetraploid species of hybrid origin, with the diploid species as one parent. The diploid species was then named P. appalachianum. The other parent of P. virginianum was found to be Polypodium sibiricum. The tetraploid of hybrid derivation tolerates warmer climates than either parent.

Character	P. appalachianum	P. virginianum
Frond shape	Widest near bottom	Widest in middle
Pinnule shape	Narrow, more nearly pointed	Broader, more rounded
Basal pinnule notch	Present	Absent

Polypodium sibiricum is also now known to be one of the parents of the allotetraploid Polypodium vulgare, along with Polypodium glycyrrhiza.

P. appalachianum is an epipetric plant, preferring sandstone or other hard, noncalcareous rocks. However, it is known to grow as an epiphyte in the Smoky Mountains. Throughout much of its range, it will be found to grow in places more sheltered from the sun and heat than is P. virginianum. Both species, and their hybrid, can form large clonal colonies, forming dense mats that hold organic matter in place on rock shelves and surfaces.
