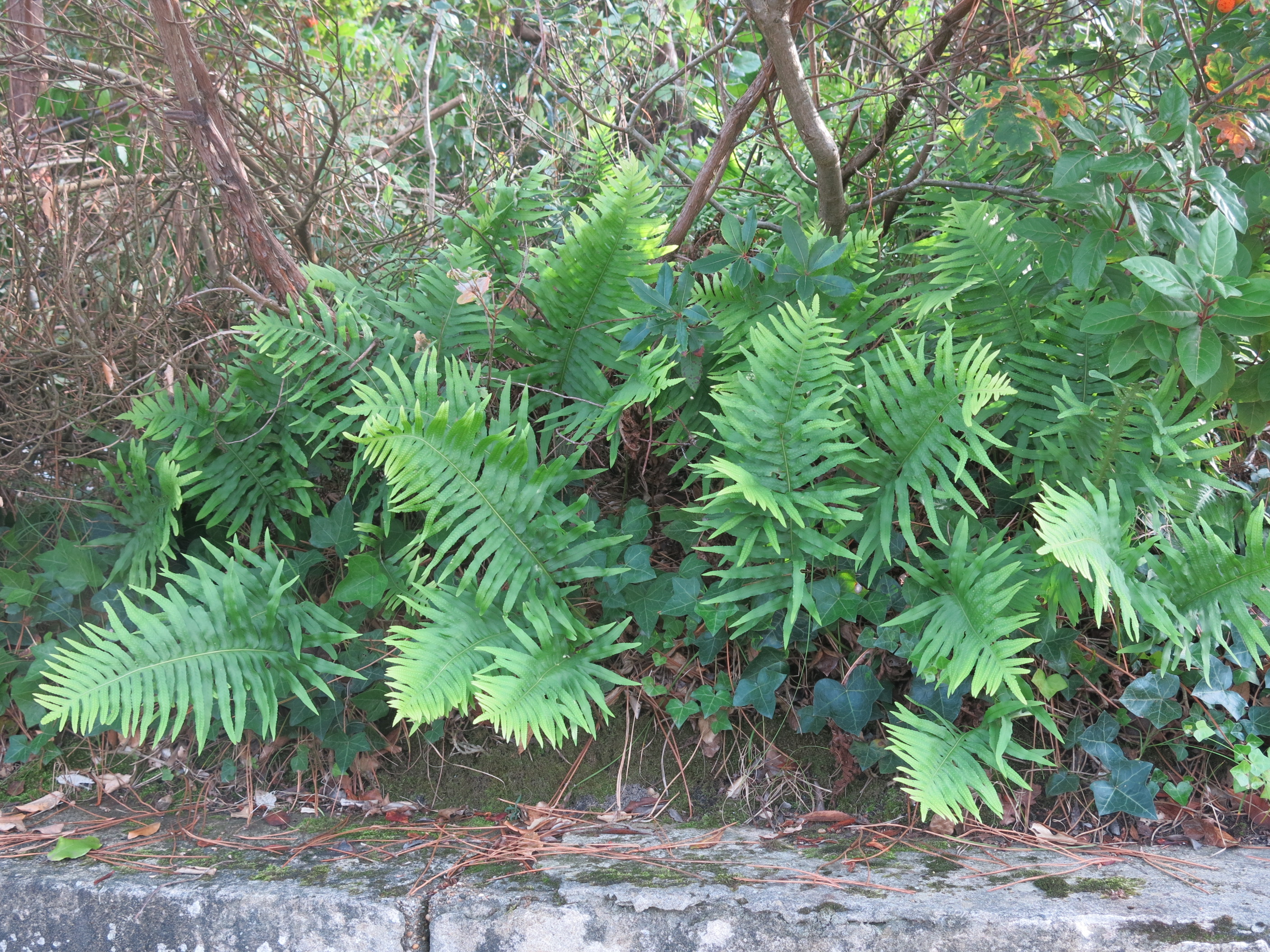

Scientific classification
- Kingdom: Plantae
- Clade: Embryophytes
- Clade: Tracheophytes
- Division: Polypodiophyta
- Class: Polypodiopsida
- Order: Polypodiales
- Suborder: Polypodiineae
- Family: Polypodiaceae
- Genus: Polypodium
- Species: P. cambricum

Binomial name
- Polypodium cambricum L.

= Polypodium cambricum =

Species of fern

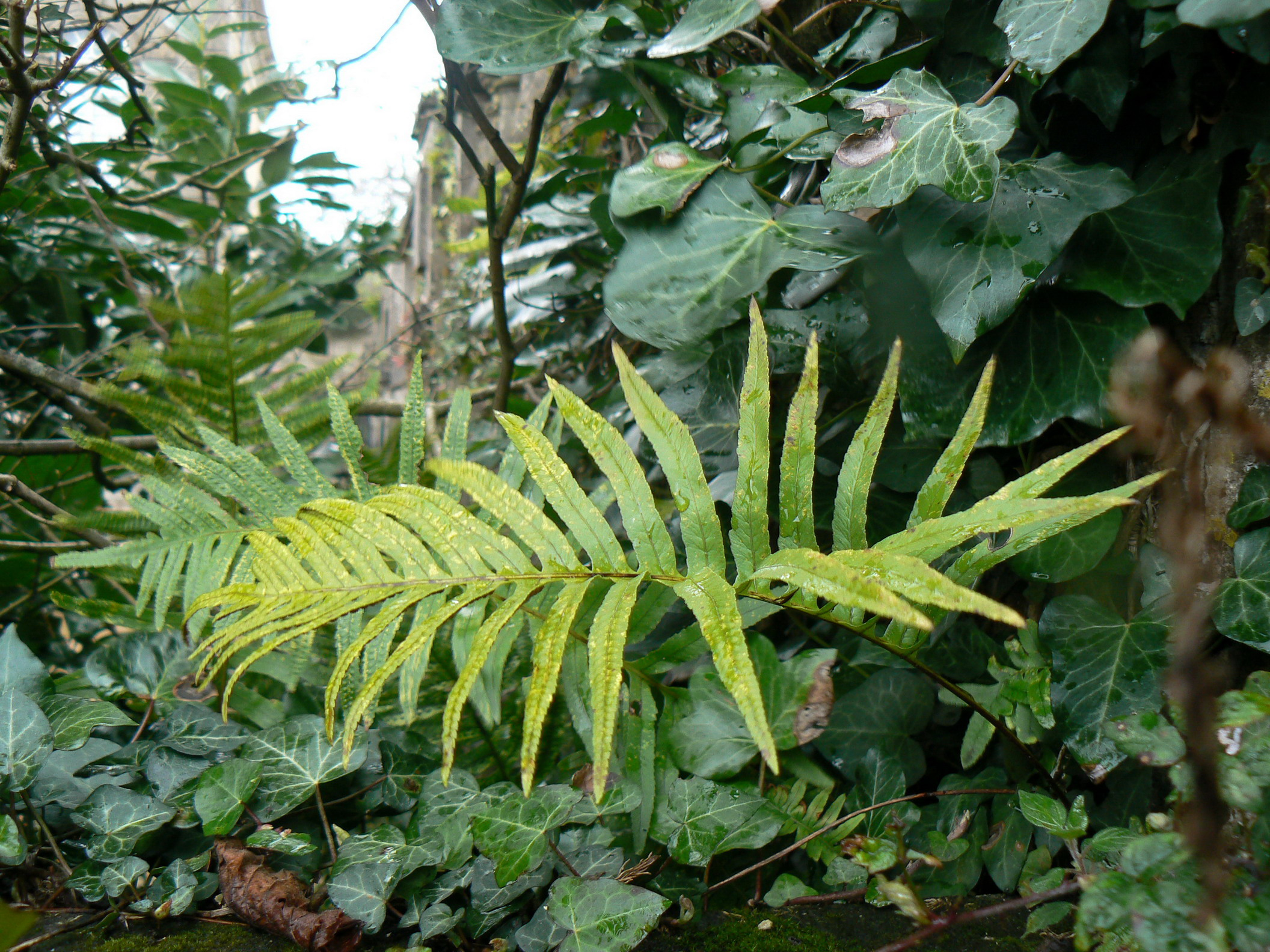
Frond showing broad base and pointed leaflets

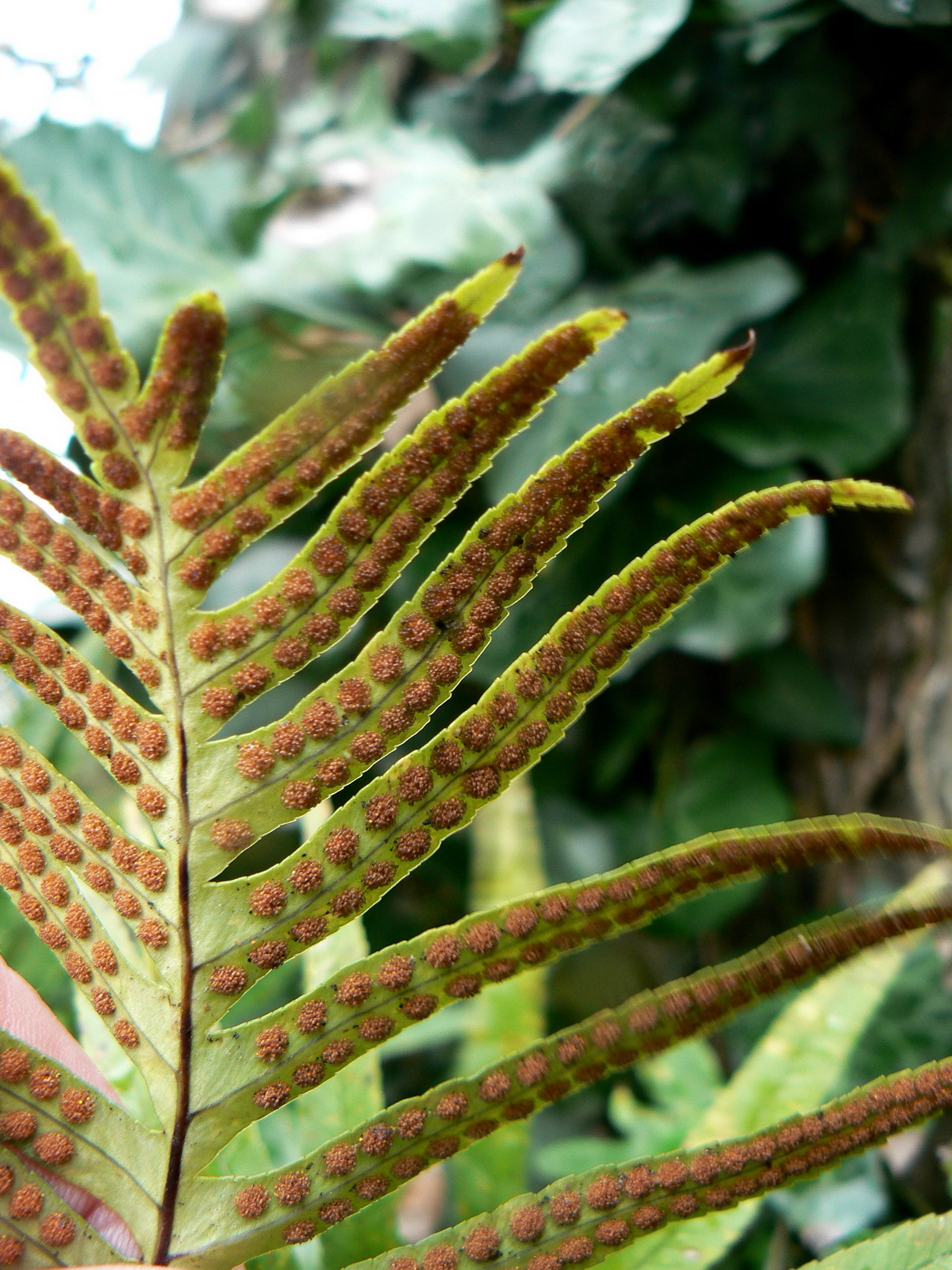
Sori under the leaf

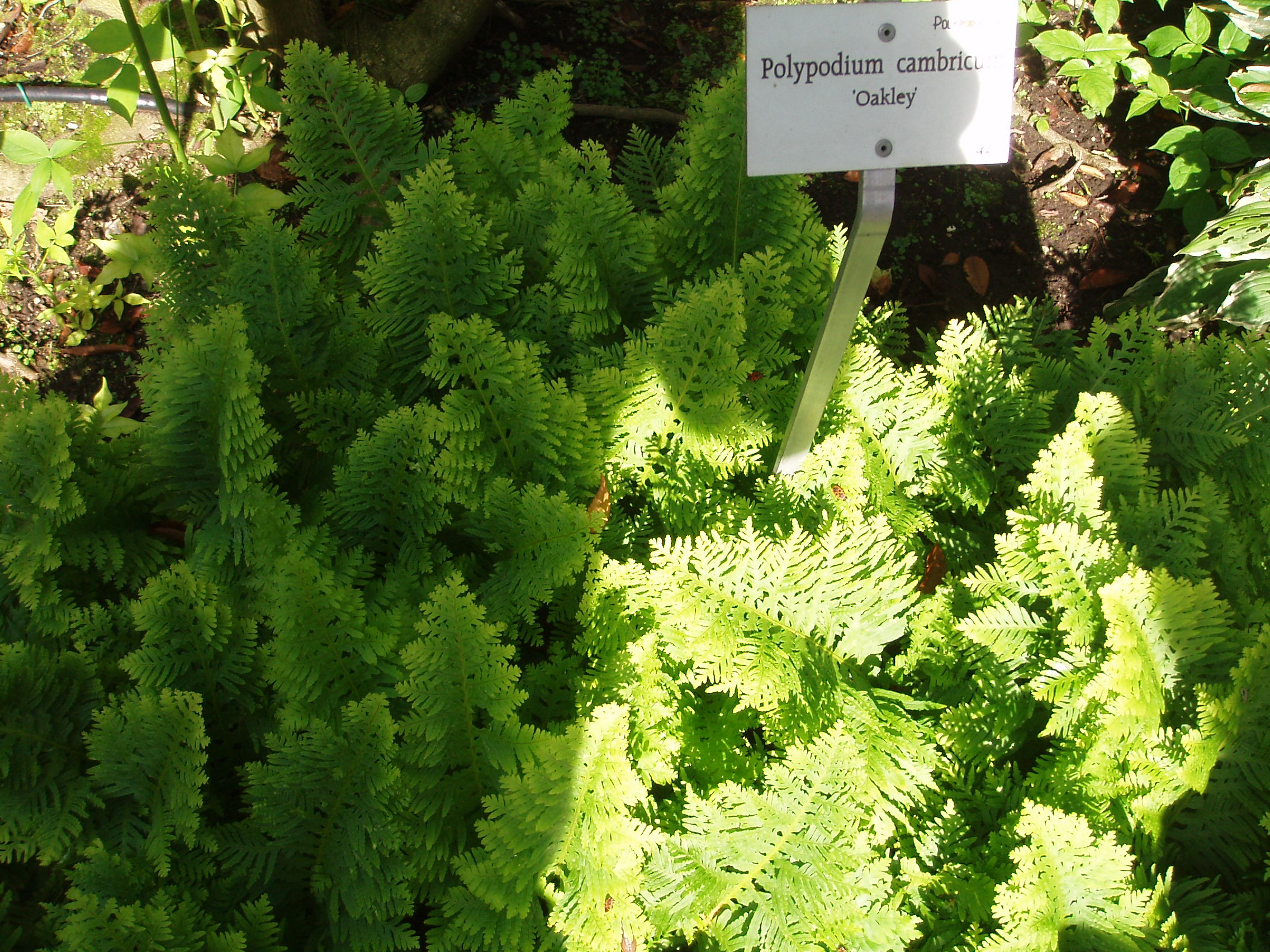
Example cultivar, 'Oakley'

Polypodium cambricum, the southern polypody, limestone polypody, or Welsh polypody, is a species of fern in the family Polypodiaceae, native to southern and western Europe where it grows on shady rocks, near the coasts of the Mediterranean Basin and in the mountains of Atlantic Europe. It is a spreading, terrestrial, deciduous fern growing to 60 centimetres (24 in) tall, with pinnate fronds. The sori are yellow in winter.

== Description ==
Perennial. Rhizome elongate, often above ground, densely covered with rusty scales. Fronds distich, 5–30 centimetres (2.0–11.8 in), glabrous, deltoid in outline; petiole yellowish green, shorter than the pinnatipartite limb. Segments 5-28 on each side; margin dentate, marked with a strong midrib. Sori round, 2–4 millimetres (0.079–0.157 in) in diameter, orange-yellow, arranged on each side of the midrib of segments. The fruits bloom from February to July.

== Name ==
This species has been widely known by the more apt name P. australe Fée. However, since Linnaeus did mention the species, albeit in the aberrant cambricum-form, that name must have priority.

== Etymology ==
Polypodium is derived from the Greek Polus, many, and podion, small foot, since the rhizome bears numerous roots. The specific epithet cambricum means "Welsh", from the Latinized form of Cymru, the Welsh name for Wales.

Australe comes from the Latin auter, the wind of the south, for in Europe, this species grows largely in the Mediterranean Basin.

== Cultivation ==
Two cultivars have received the Royal Horticultural Society's Award of Garden Merit:

- 'Cambricum'
- 'Grandiceps Fox' (Cristatum Group)
