= Pecluma pastazensis =

Conservation status
- Near Threatened (IUCN 3.1)

Scientific classification
- Kingdom: Plantae
- Clade: Tracheophytes
- Division: Polypodiophyta
- Class: Polypodiopsida
- Order: Polypodiales
- Suborder: Polypodiineae
- Family: Polypodiaceae
- Genus: Pecluma
- Species: P. pastazensis

Binomial name
- Pecluma pastazensis (Hieron.) R.C.Moran

Synonyms
- Polypodium pastazense Hieron.

Species of fern

Pecluma pastazensis is a species of fern in the family Polypodiaceae. It is endemic to Ecuador. Its natural habitats are subtropical or tropical moist lowland forests and subtropical or tropical moist montane forests. It is threatened by habitat loss.
