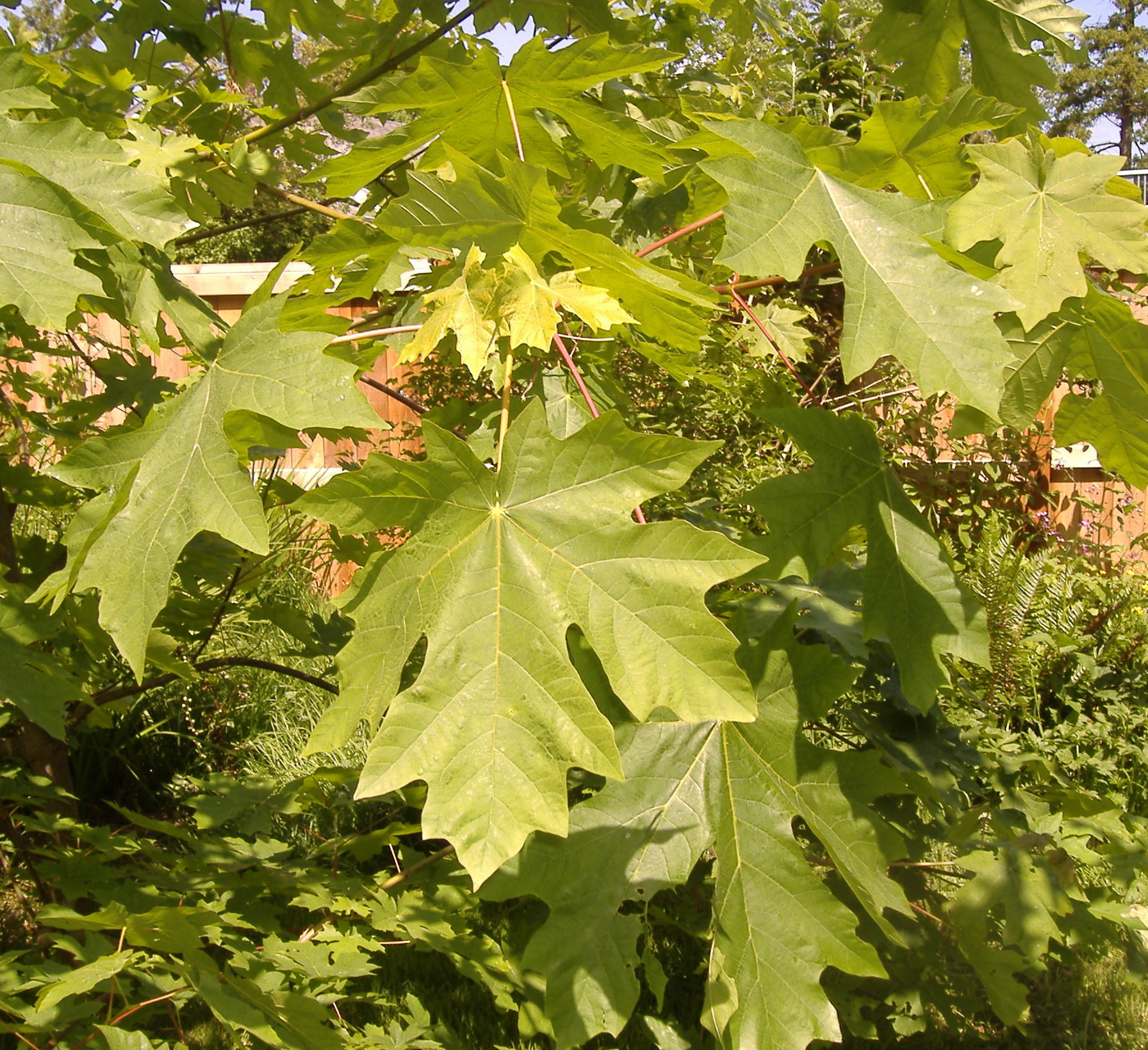
- Bigleaf maple foliage

Conservation status
- Least Concern (IUCN 3.1)

Scientific classification
- Kingdom: Plantae
- Clade: Tracheophytes
- Clade: Angiosperms
- Clade: Eudicots
- Clade: Rosids
- Order: Sapindales
- Family: Sapindaceae
- Genus: Acer
- Section: Acer sect. Macrophylla
- Species: A. macrophyllum

Binomial name
- Acer macrophyllum Pursh 1813
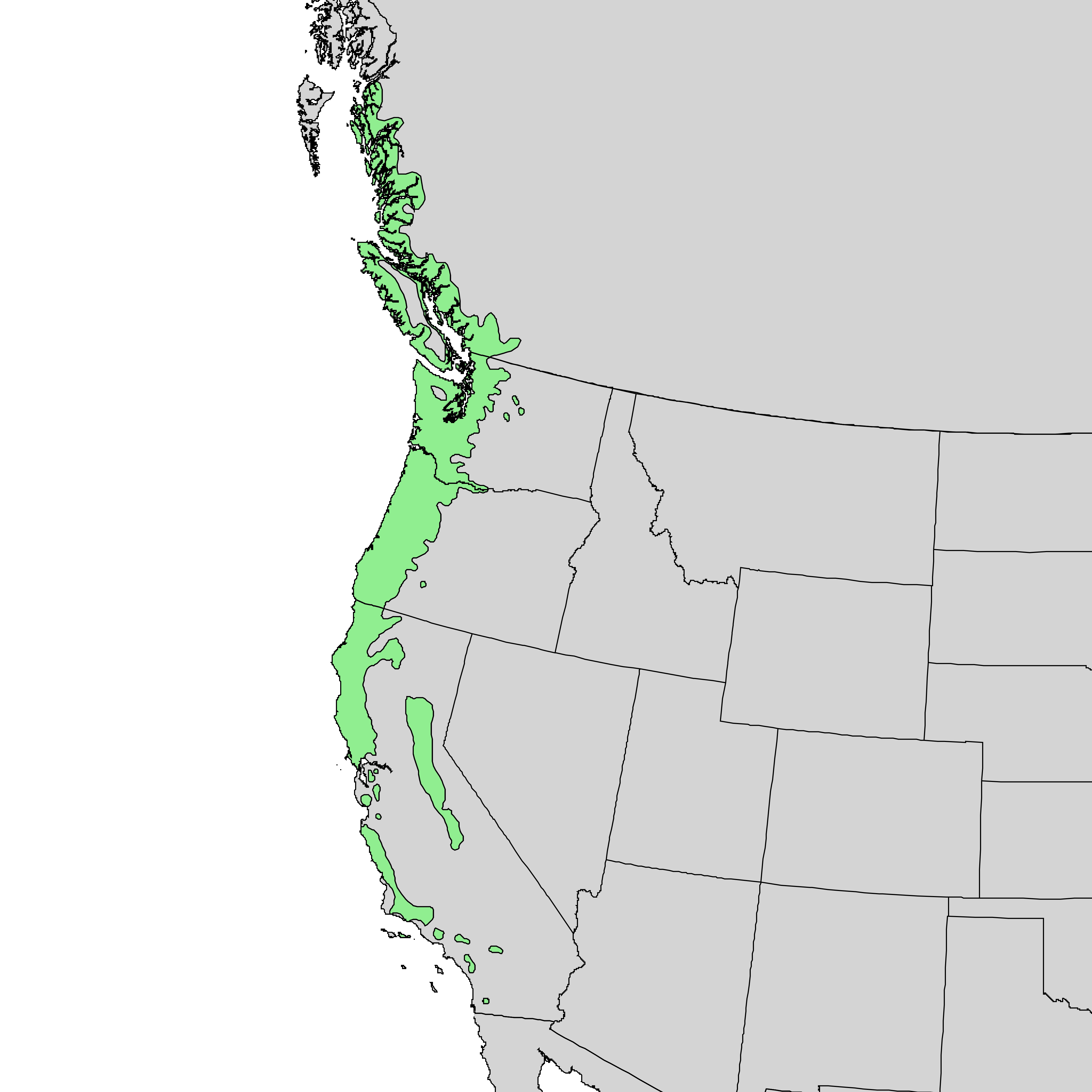
- Natural range

Synonyms
- List: Acer auritum Greene; Acer dactylophyllum Greene; Acer flabellatum Greene 1912 not Rehder 1905; Acer hemionitis Greene; Acer leptodactylon Greene; Acer murrayanum Dippel; Acer palmatum Raf. 1836 not Thumb. 1784; Acer platypterum Greene; Acer politum Greene; Acer stellatum Greene

= Acer macrophyllum =

Species of maple

Acer macrophyllum, the bigleaf maple or Oregon maple, is a large deciduous tree in the genus Acer. It is native to western North America. In addition to uses by animals, it is of some culinary and woodworking interest.

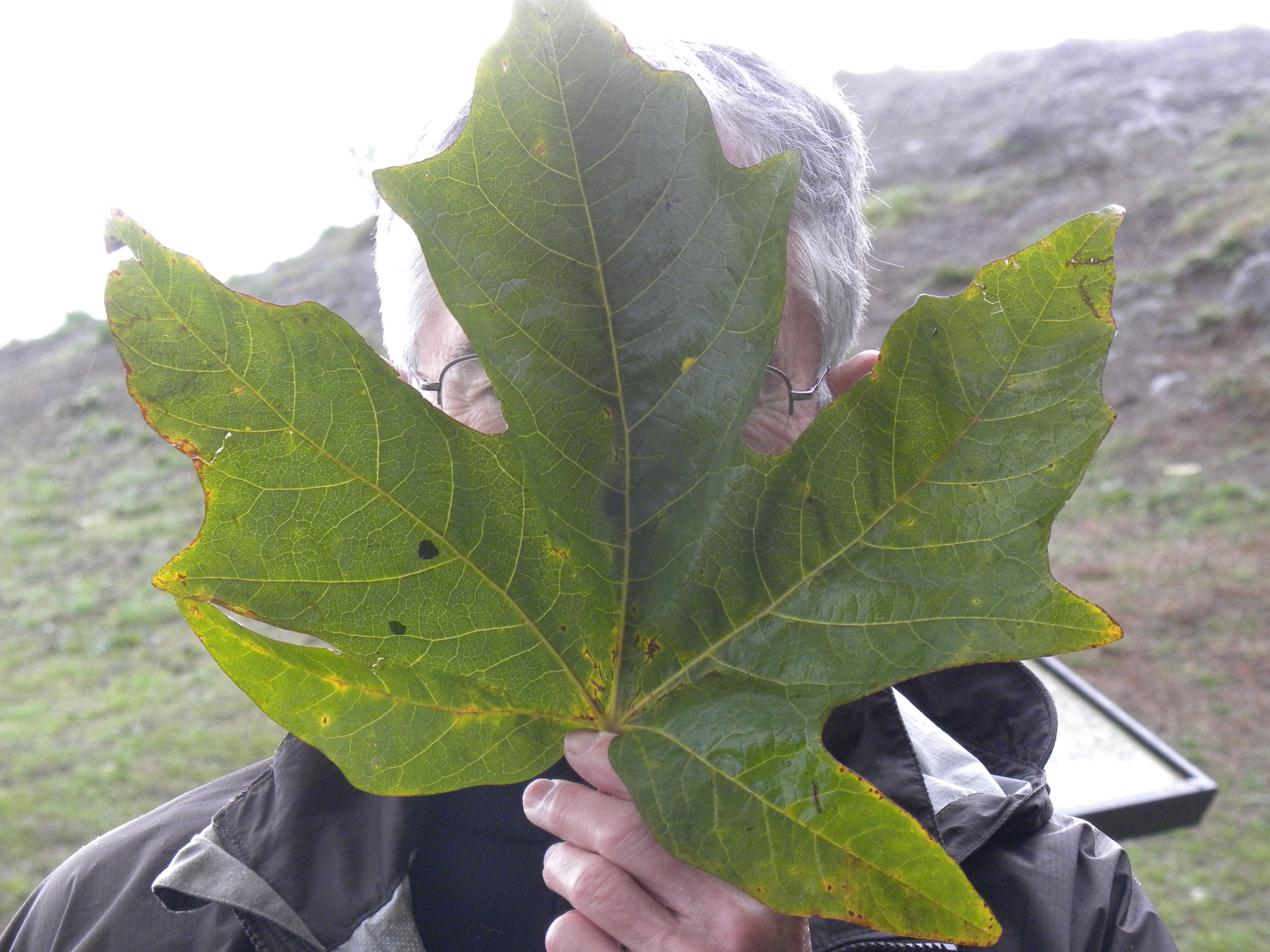
Large Acer macrophyllum leaf in Washington State

== Description ==
Bigleaf maple can grow up to 48 metres (158 feet) tall, but more commonly reaches 15–20 m (50–65 ft) tall and 90–120 centimetres (35–47 inches). The species' current United States' national champion for size is located in Lane County, Oregon. It is 36 m (119 ft) tall with a crown spread of 28 m (91 ft), with an average diameter at breast height (dbh) of about 3.7 m (12 ft). The previous national champion is located in Marion, Oregon, and is 27 m (88 ft) tall with a crown spread of 32 m (104 ft), with an average dbh of about 2.5 m (8 ft). The bark is gray brown, darkening and developing ridges with age.

The bigleaf maple has the largest leaves of any maple, typically 15–30 cm (6–12 in) across with five deeply incised palmate lobes, with the largest running to 61 cm (24 in). The stems are 15–30 cm (6–12 in) long and contain milky sap. In autumn, the leaves turn gold and yellow, contrasting against backdrops of evergreen conifers. In spring, the tree produces flowers in pendulous racemes 10–15 cm (4–6 in) long, greenish-yellow with inconspicuous petals. It is hermaphroditic, bearing both male and female flowers in each raceme. The flowers appear in early spring, before the leaves. The fruit is a paired winged samara, each seed 1–1.5 cm (3/8–5/8 in) in diameter with a 4–5 cm (1 5/8–2 in) wing. Bigleaf maple begins bearing seed at about ten years of age.

Unofficial world's largest maple leaf found Circa 1990 at Shawnigan Lake, Vancouver Island, British Columbia, Canada - measuring 63.4 cm W by 52.3 cm H (without stem).

In May 2018 the oldest two Oregon maples in Europe, 175 years old, were removed from Trinity College Dublin (TCD), Ireland. The first had an interior which was beginning to rot, and it fell after inclement windy weather. The second, also infected, was cut down as the same fate was expected. Both were in the adjoining grassy area which was originally the cemetery of All Hallows and is now the Front Square of TCD.

=== Chemistry ===
The fallen leaves, blossoms, and seeds are concentrated with potassium, calcium, and other nutrients.

== Distribution and habitat ==
Bigleaf maple mostly occurs near North America's Pacific coast, west of British Columbia's Coast Ranges and the Cascade Range, from southernmost Alaska to southern California. Some stands are also found inland in the foothills of the Sierra Nevada of central California, and a tiny population occurs in central Idaho.

It usually grows from sea level to elevations of 450 m (1,480 ft), and more exceptionally 1,200 m (3,900 ft). It can form pure stands on moist soils in proximity to streams, but is generally found within riparian hardwood forests or dispersed, (under or within), relatively open canopies of conifers, mixed evergreens, or oaks (Quercus spp.) In cool and moist temperate mixed woods they are one of the dominant species. Though very rare north of Vancouver Island, it is cultivated in Prince Rupert, near Ketchikan, and in Juneau.

== Ecology ==
The tree can live in a wide range of habitats, but thrives in fairly well-hydrated hardwood forests, occurring with red alder, black cottonwood, and willows. It is fairly shade tolerant, but not as much so as vine maple, and benefits from disturbances. It is not considered to be fire-resistant due to its thin bark, but large trees with thick bark may survive moderate fires. Along with red alder, bigleaf maple often dominates early postfire succession in Douglas-fir forests, and fire can increase its forest presence. It spreads and grows vegetatively from cuttings and stumps of any size in a prolific manner.

Insects fertilize the tree's flowers. The winged fruits are eaten by squirrels, and by grosbeaks in the winter. Deer mice have been observed consuming bigleaf maple seeds in the spring in the Sierra Nevada. The foliage is browsed by ungulates such as black-tailed deer, mule deer, elk, and horses, as well as by mountain beavers and other rodents. A western Oregon study found that 60% of bigleaf maple seedlings over 25 cm (10 in) tall had been browsed by deer, most several times.

Bigleaf maple is preferred as habitat by the barred owl, an invasive species to coast range habitat, and the presence of the tree is positively associated with Hammond's flycatchers.

In the wetter parts of its range, such as in the Olympic National Park and lowland forest around Puget Sound, the bark is often covered with epiphytes such as club moss and licorice fern.

Older trees suffer from heart rot.

== Cultivars ==
Cultivars are plants sourced and/or bred for specific characteristics that are deemed to be attractive and/or commercializable to the mainstream public. Given the opportunity, cultivars will near-universally cross with their native counterparts, which brings a risk of contamination to local genetic stock that can be a challenge to identify. Examples of cultivars include:

- 'Mocha Rose' — foliage in various shades of pink over growing season; red flowers
- 'Santiam Snows' — green leaves speckled with white
- 'Seattle Sentinel' — upright, columnar plant habit

== Uses ==
Native Americans grew sprouts from the seeds for consumption, wove baskets from the inner bark, and used the leaves to cover food in cooking pits. They also carved the wood into dishes, utensils, and canoe paddles.

Maple syrup has been made from the sap of bigleaf maple trees. While the sugar concentration is about the same as in Acer saccharum (sugar maple), the flavor is somewhat different. Interest in commercially producing syrup from bigleaf maple sap has been limited. Although not traditionally used for syrup production, it takes about 40 volumes of sap to produce 1 volume of maple syrup.

The buds of the tree are also considered edible. They are often fried and made into fritters.

=== Lumber ===
The bigleaf maple is the only commercially important maple of the Pacific Coast region.

The wood is primarily used in veneer production for furniture, but is also used in musical instrument production (including piano frames), interior paneling, and other hardwood products; the heartwood is light reddish-brown, fine-grained, moderately heavy, and fairly robust. It sometimes shows a quilted figure.

In California, land managers do not highly value bigleaf maples, and they are often intentionally knocked over and left unharvested during harvests for Douglas fir and redwood stands.

== Gallery ==
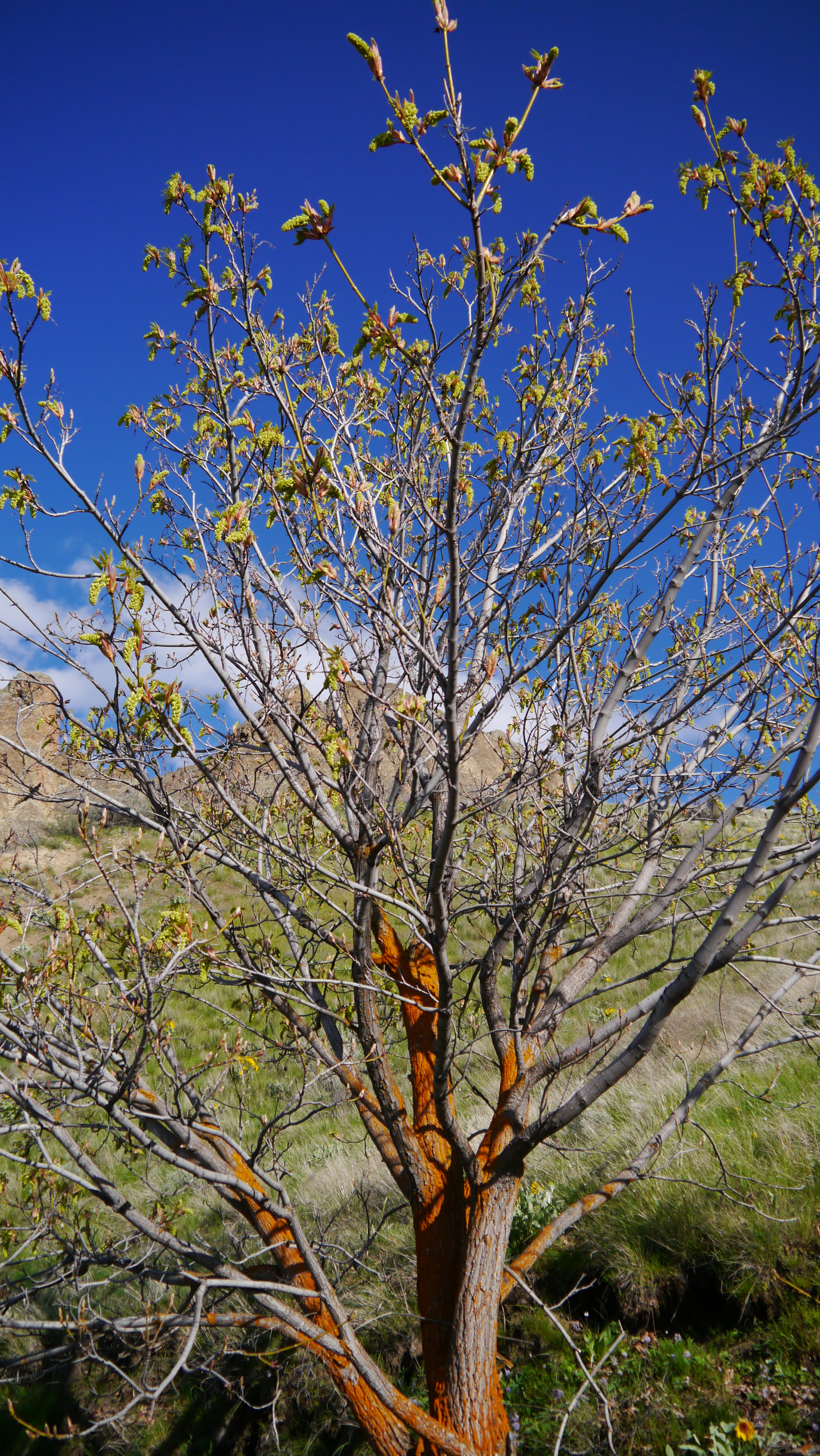
Acer macrophyllum in early spring

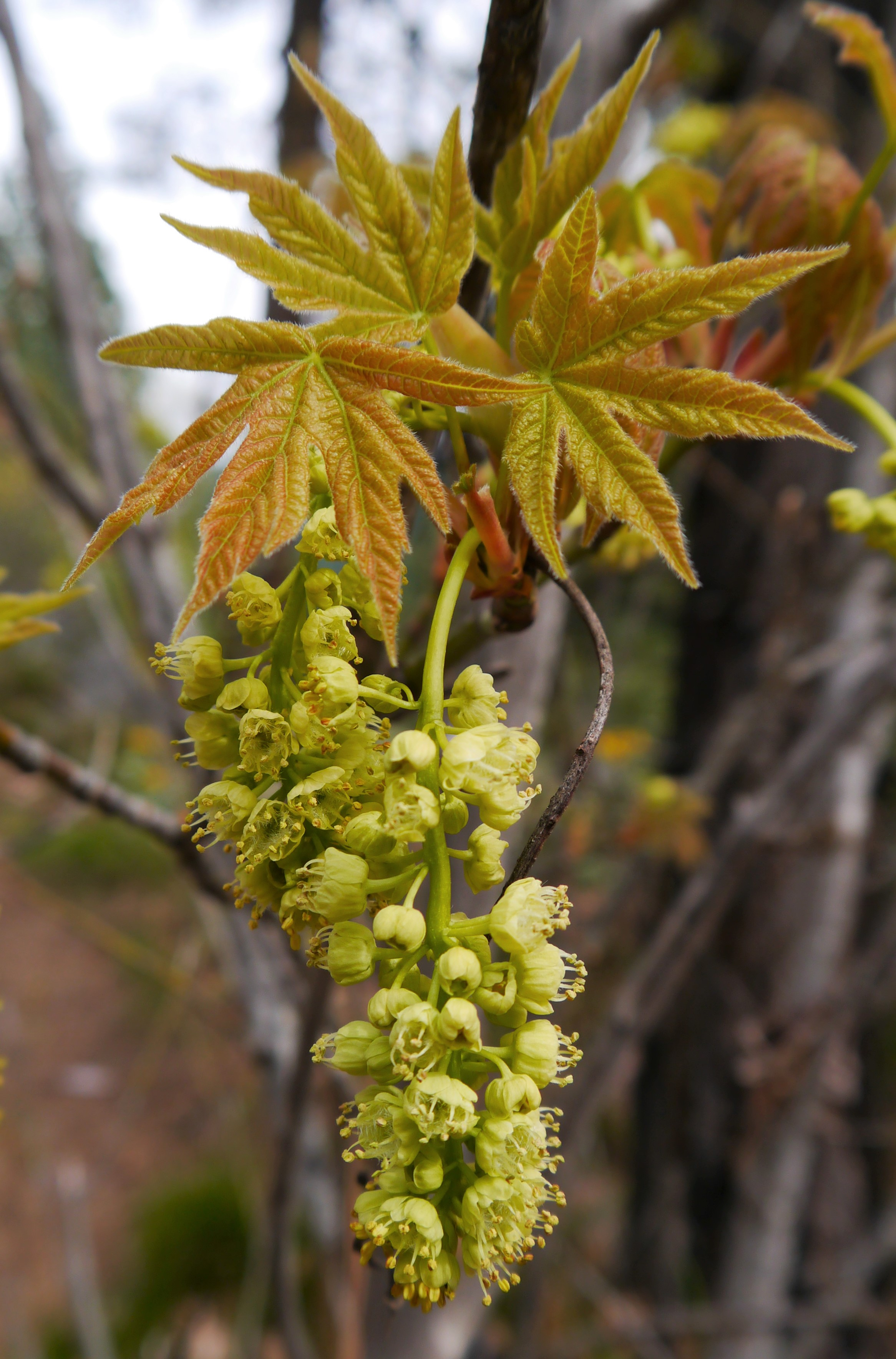
The 10–15-centimetre (4–6-inch)-long raceme of greenish-yellow flowers appear as the leaves are developing in the spring.

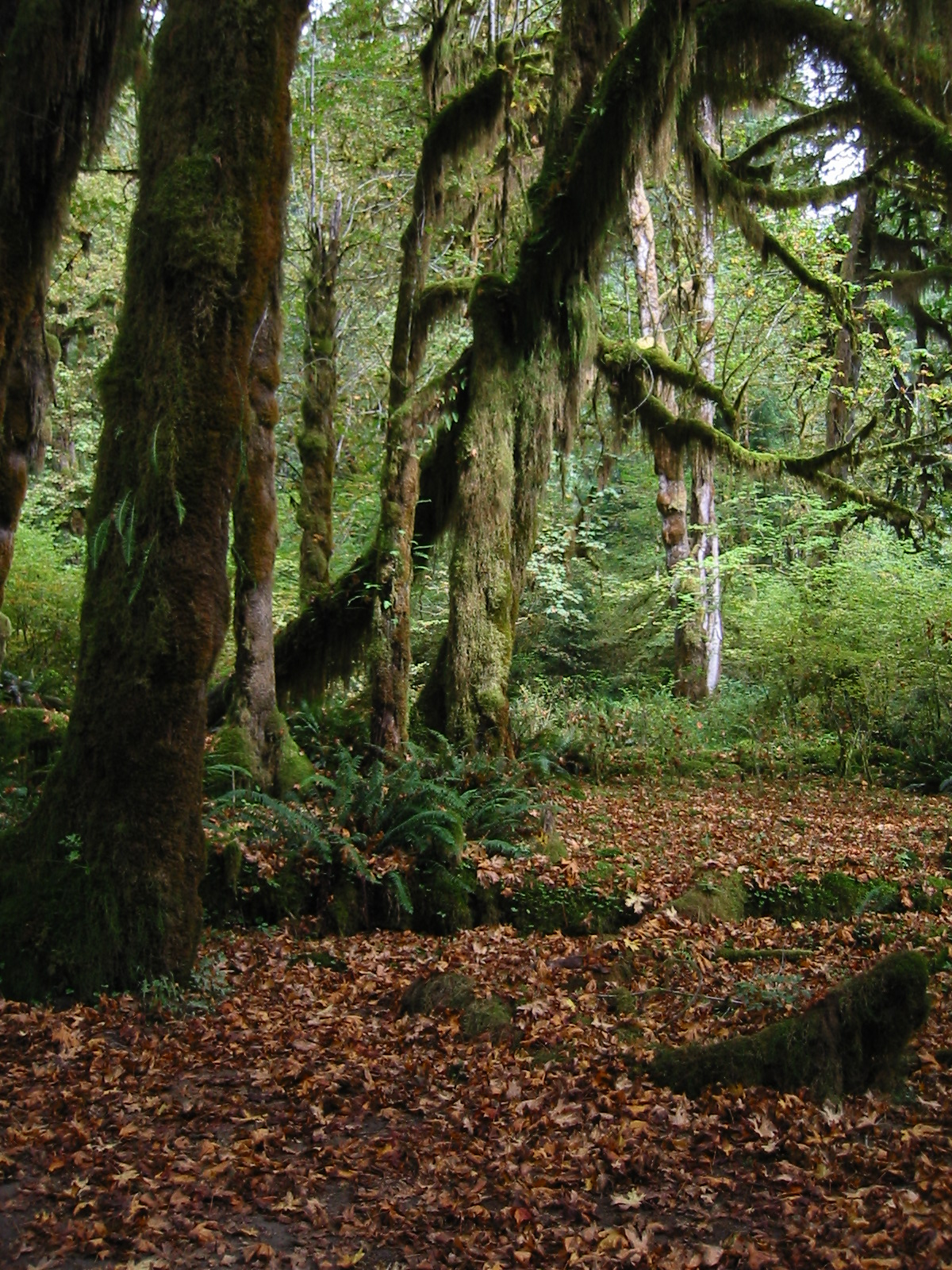
Moss and Licorice fern on Bigleaf maple in Hoh Rainforest in Olympic National Park, Washington

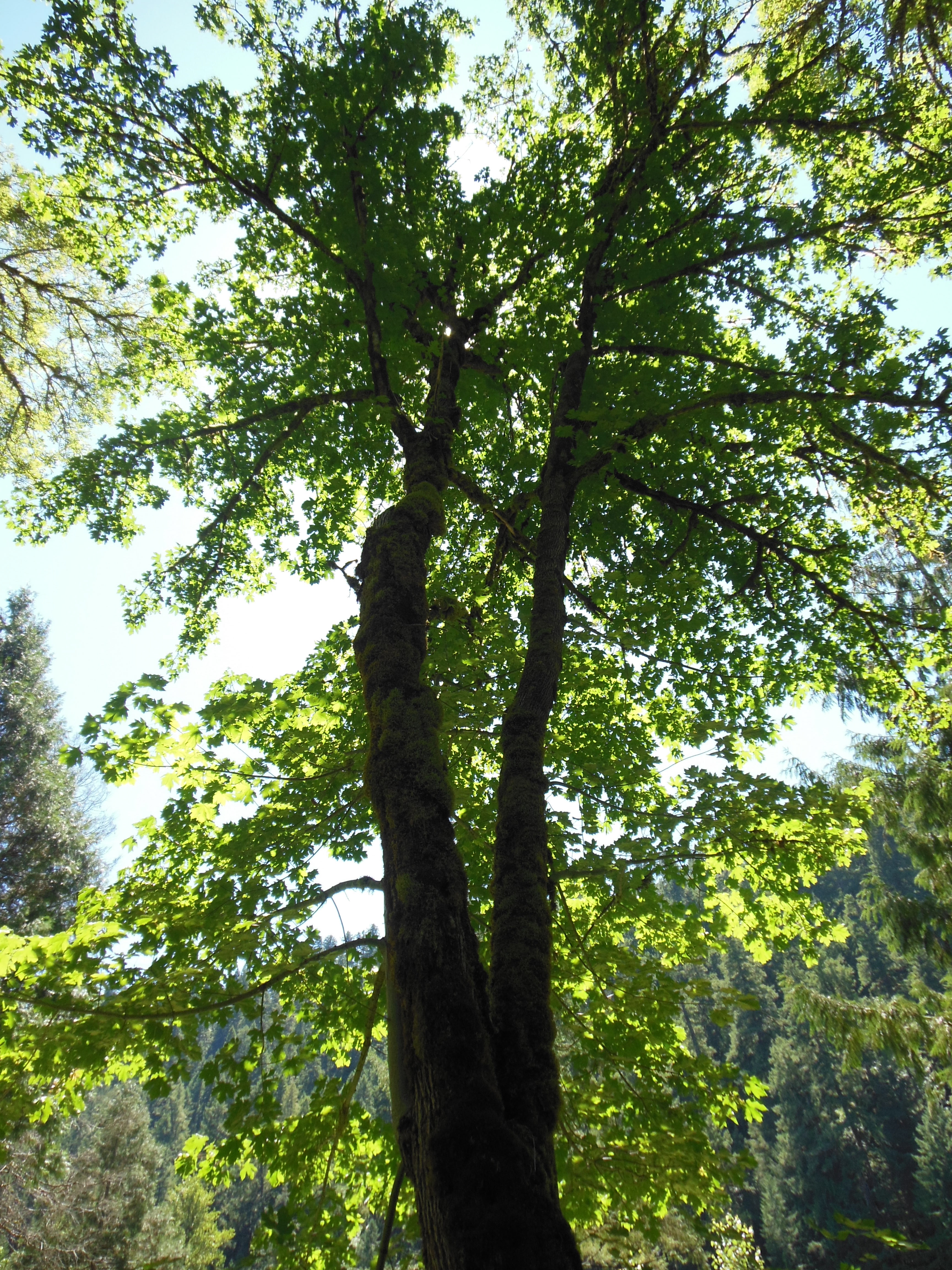
Bigleaf maple in the McKenzie River valley in western Oregon

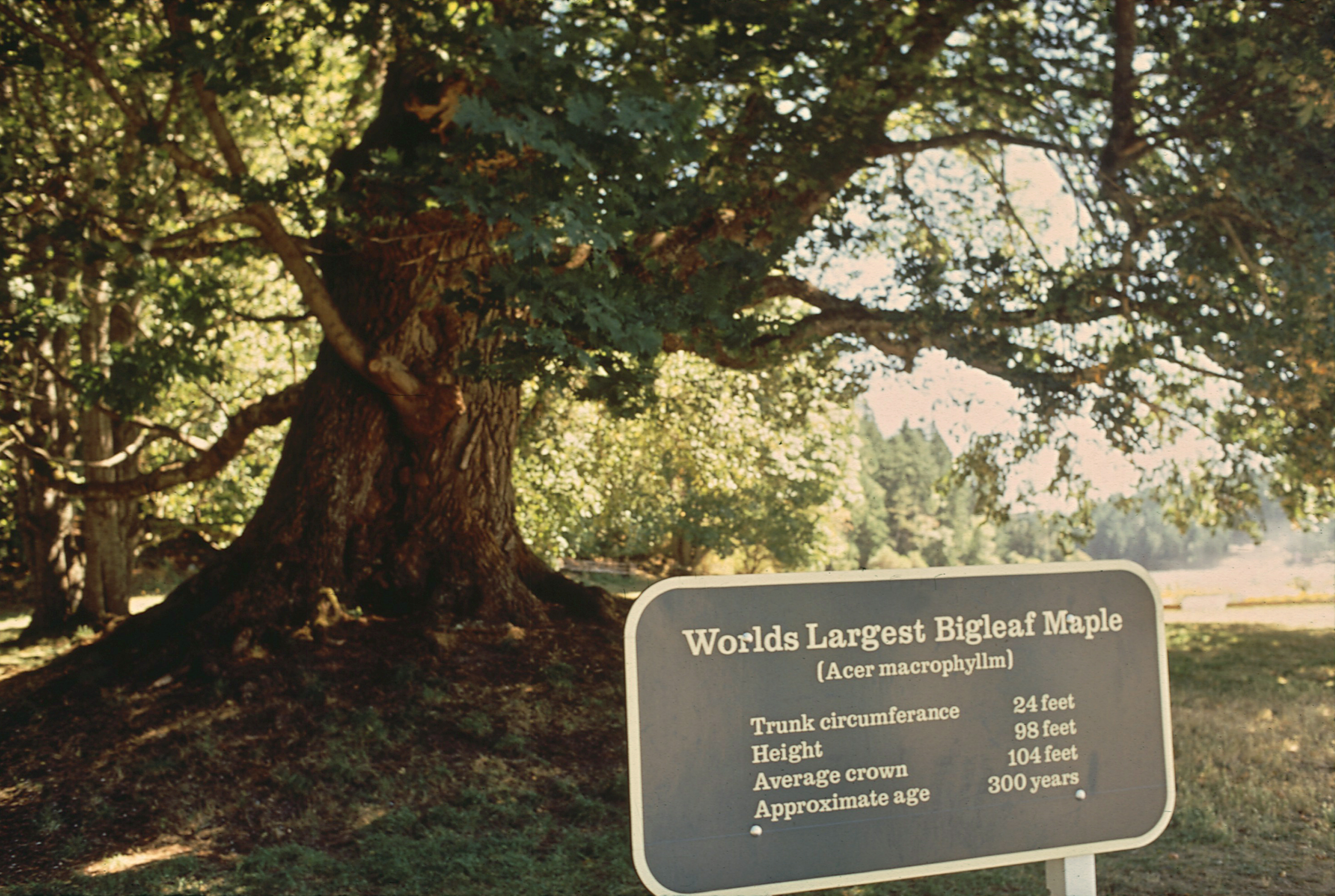
"WORLD'S LARGEST BIGLEAF MAPLE" IN ENGLISH CAMP on San Juan Island, Washington

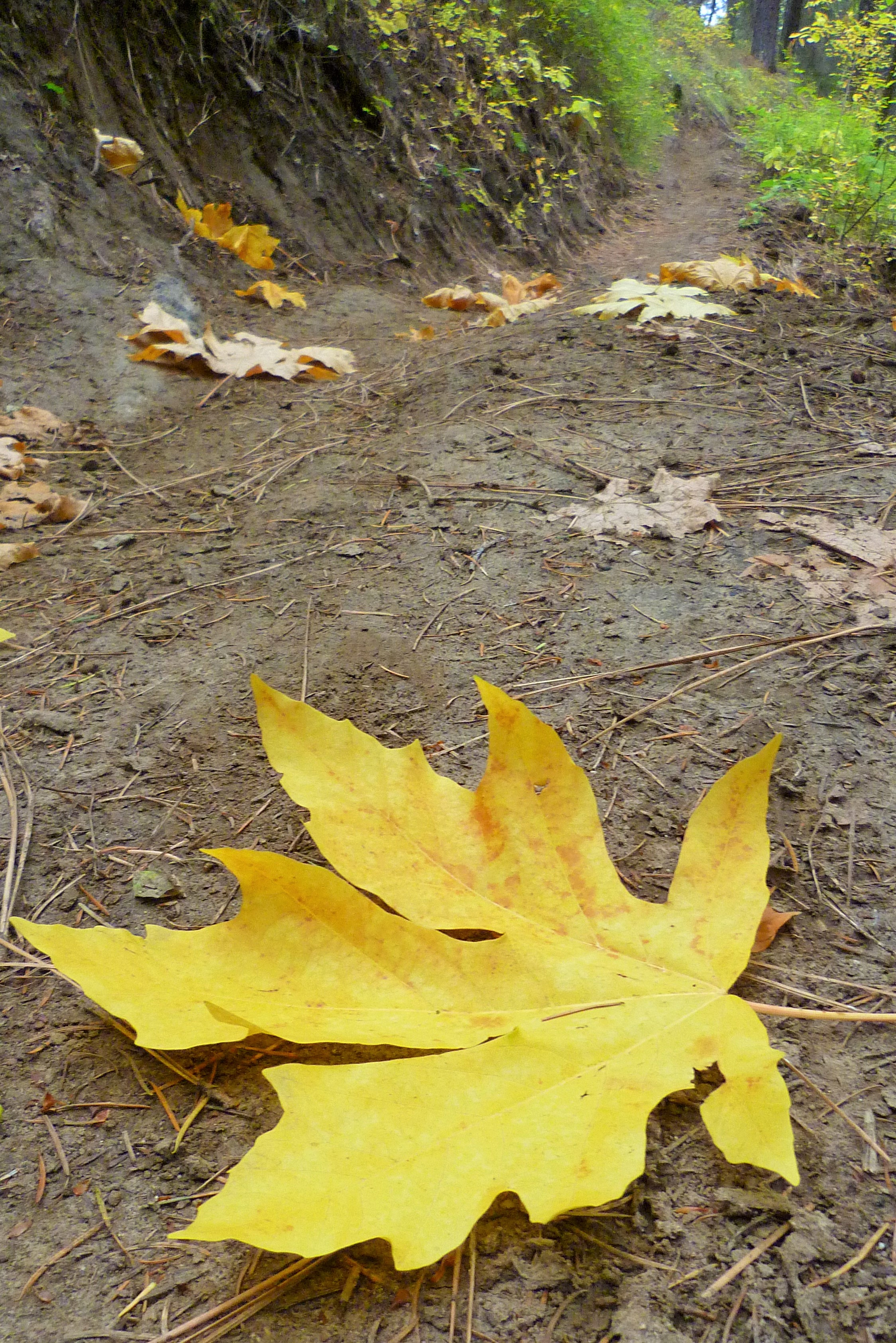
Fallen Acer macrophyllum leaf in fall near Cashmere, Washington
