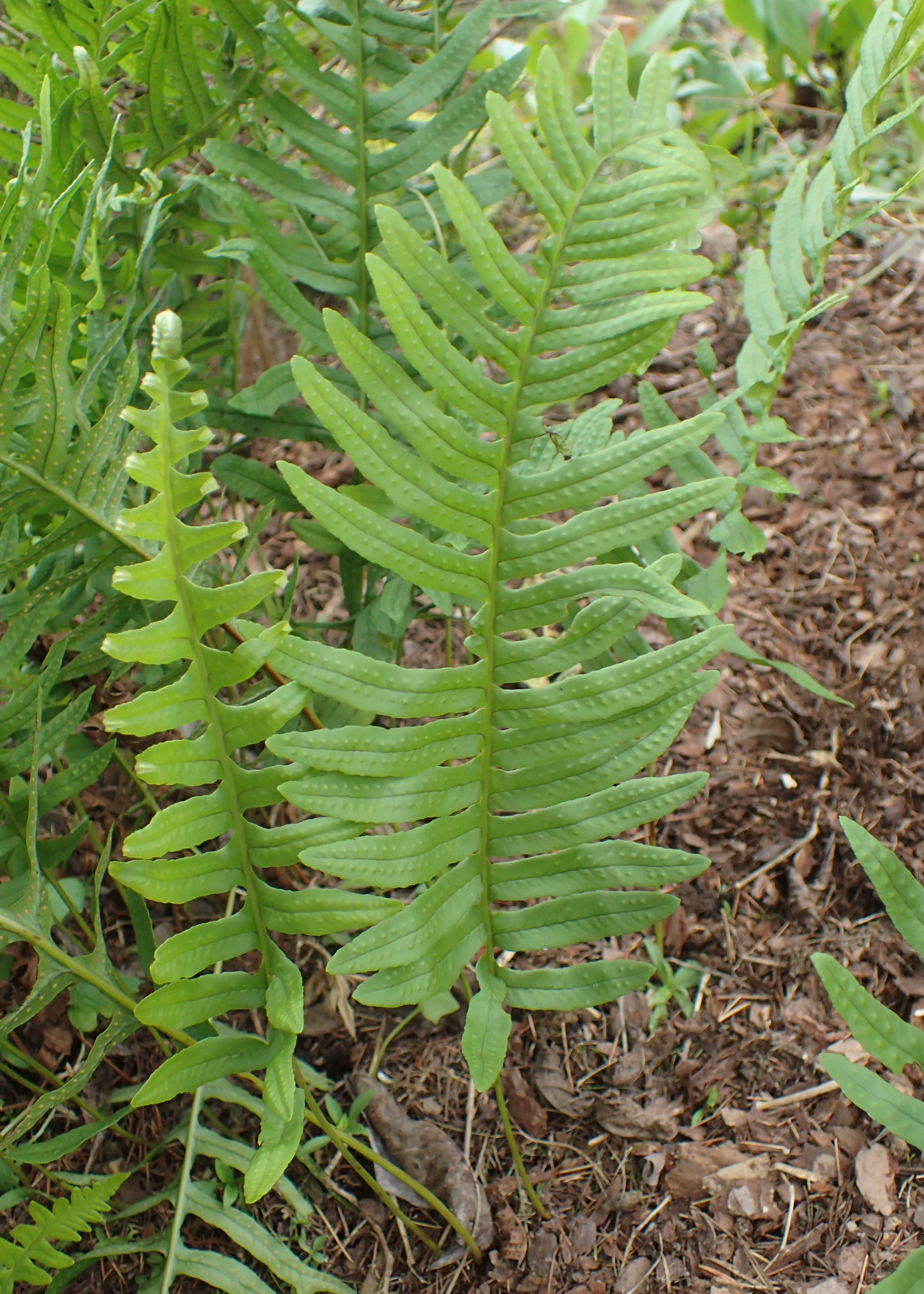

Scientific classification
- Kingdom: Plantae
- Clade: Tracheophytes
- Division: Polypodiophyta
- Class: Polypodiopsida
- Order: Polypodiales
- Suborder: Polypodiineae
- Family: Polypodiaceae
- Genus: Polypodium
- Species: P. interjectum

Binomial name
- Polypodium interjectum Shivas.

= Polypodium interjectum =

Species of plant

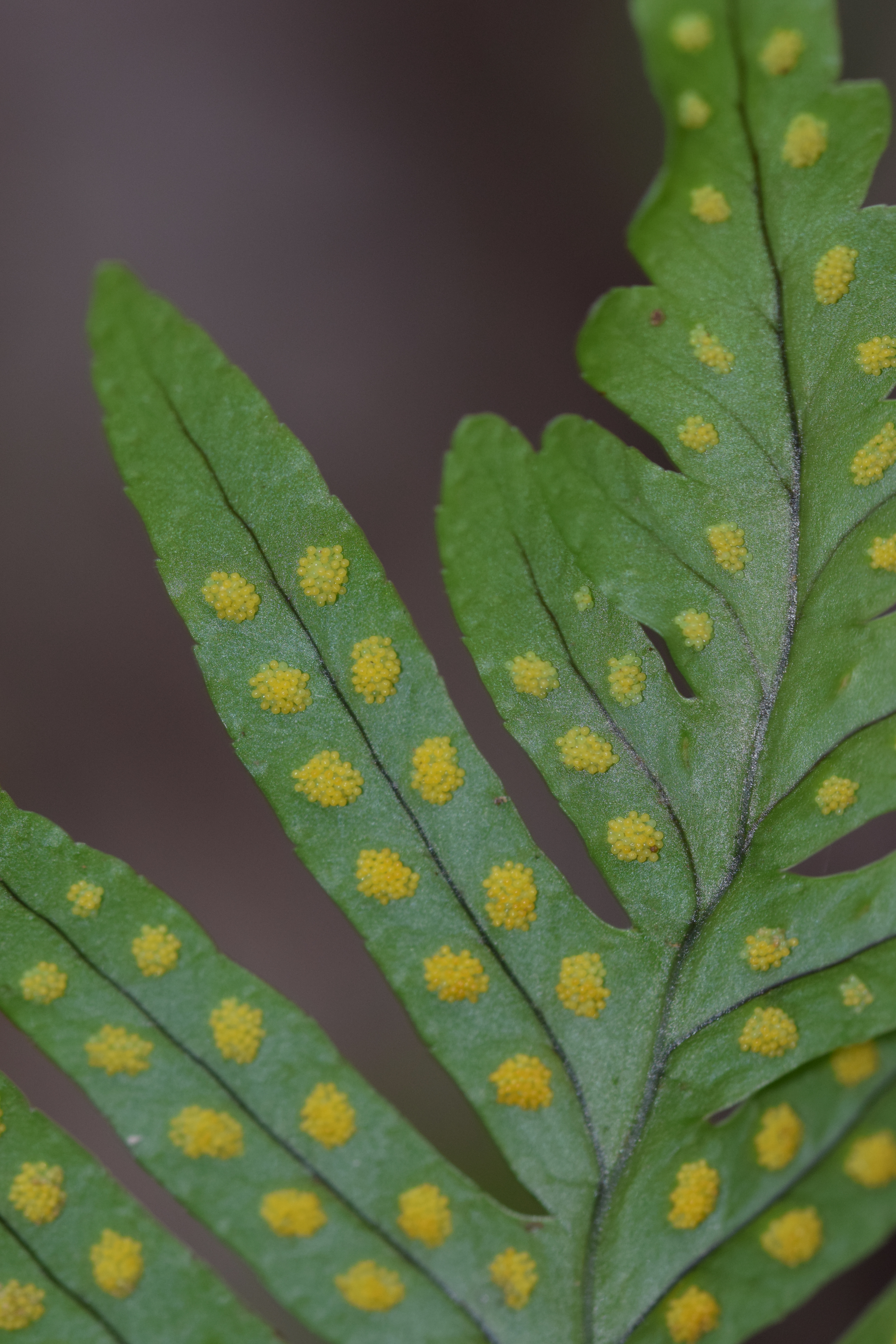
Yellowish sori lacking Indusium covering

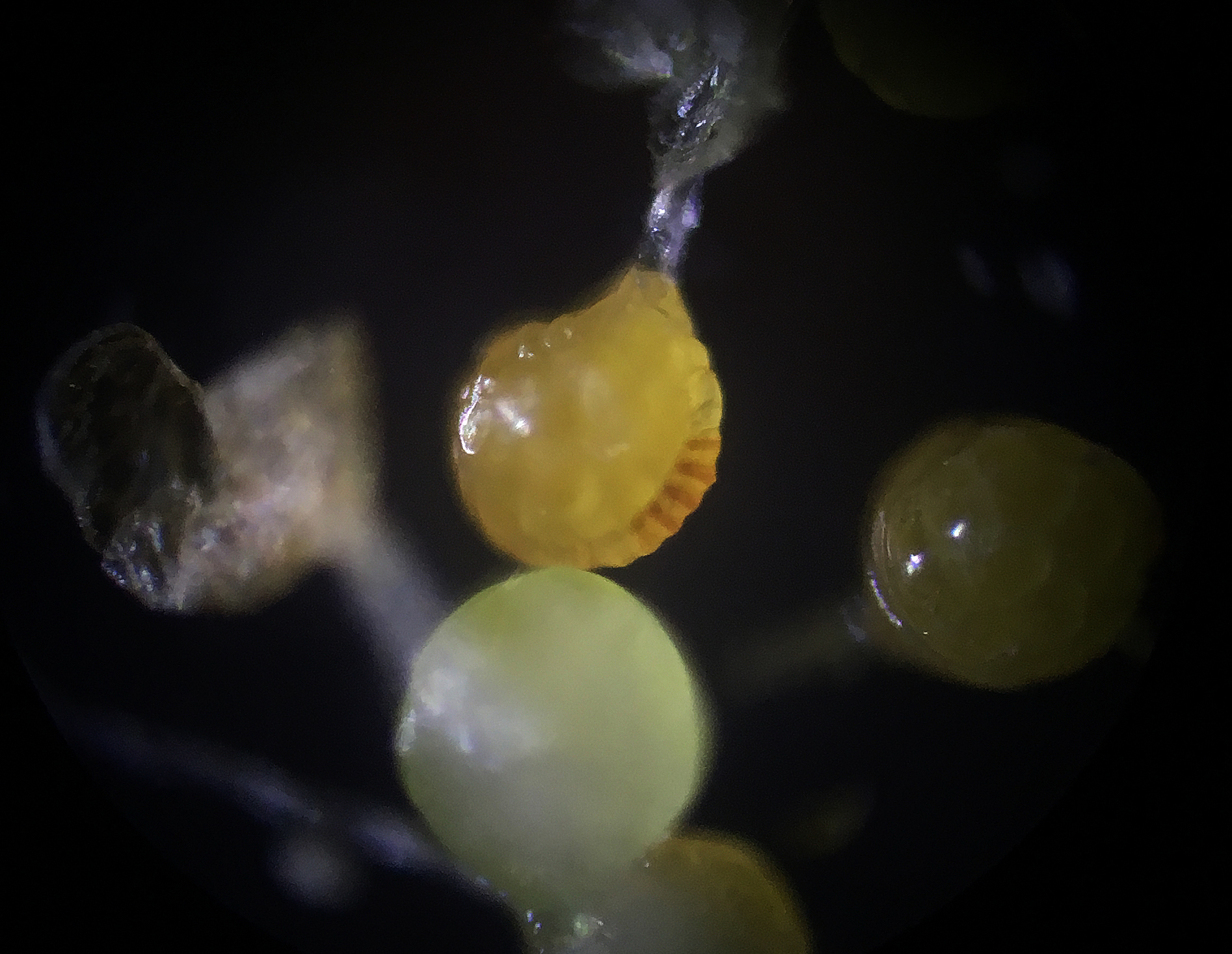
Sporangia in the Sori

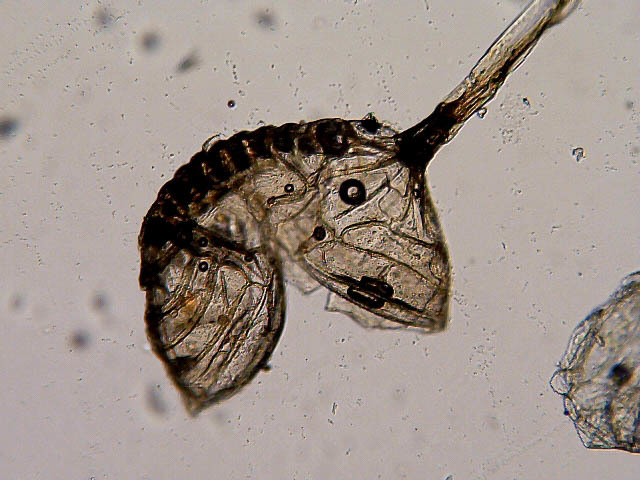
Sporangium silhouette showing annulus of thick-walled cells (visible as the arch of dark rectangles)

Polypodium interjectum is a species of fern.

== Description ==
A medium-sized, ladder-like fern possessing an oval outline (mostly 2-4 x as long as wide), widening from both ends toward the middle or a little below it, with a truncated base abruptly transitioning to its stem, the base leaflets at maturity tending to be folded inwards.

Its preferred habitat is mild basic (to slightly acidic) in slight shade.

The fertile sori under the leaf are elliptic when very young, and tend to be bright yellow when maturer but unopened.

Technically, sporangia can be scraped off from under the leaf, and under a 200x lens (or better) they on average have a small backbone (annulus) of 7-9 (4-13) thick-walled cells, with 2-3 basal cells that are much wider than the annulus, and no branched long hairs (paraphyses, 0.5-1.4 mm) intermingled.

== Similar Species ==
Similar species include -

- P. vulgare - Leaf outline is narrowish throughout (mostly 3-6 x as long as wide) with fairly straight sides except the growing top, the base leaflets tending to be held open, sori when immature round, when mature darkish, especially tolerant of acid and exposure. Sporangia at 200x have a long annulus of 10-14 (7-17) hardened cells, with 1 base cell not much wider than the annulus.
- P. cambricum - Leaf outline rather broad (width generally 50% or more of length) and usually triangular (widest at base), the base leaflets folding inwards, mostly on basic rocks in moist places. Sporangia at 200x have a similarly short annulus of 5-10 (4-19) hardened cells, with 3-4 base cells (much wider than the annulus) and some branched long 1 mm (0.5-1.4 mm) hairs intermingled. P. macaronesicum is rather similar.

== Range ==
Most of Europe, far-Western Russia, Turkey and Iran.
