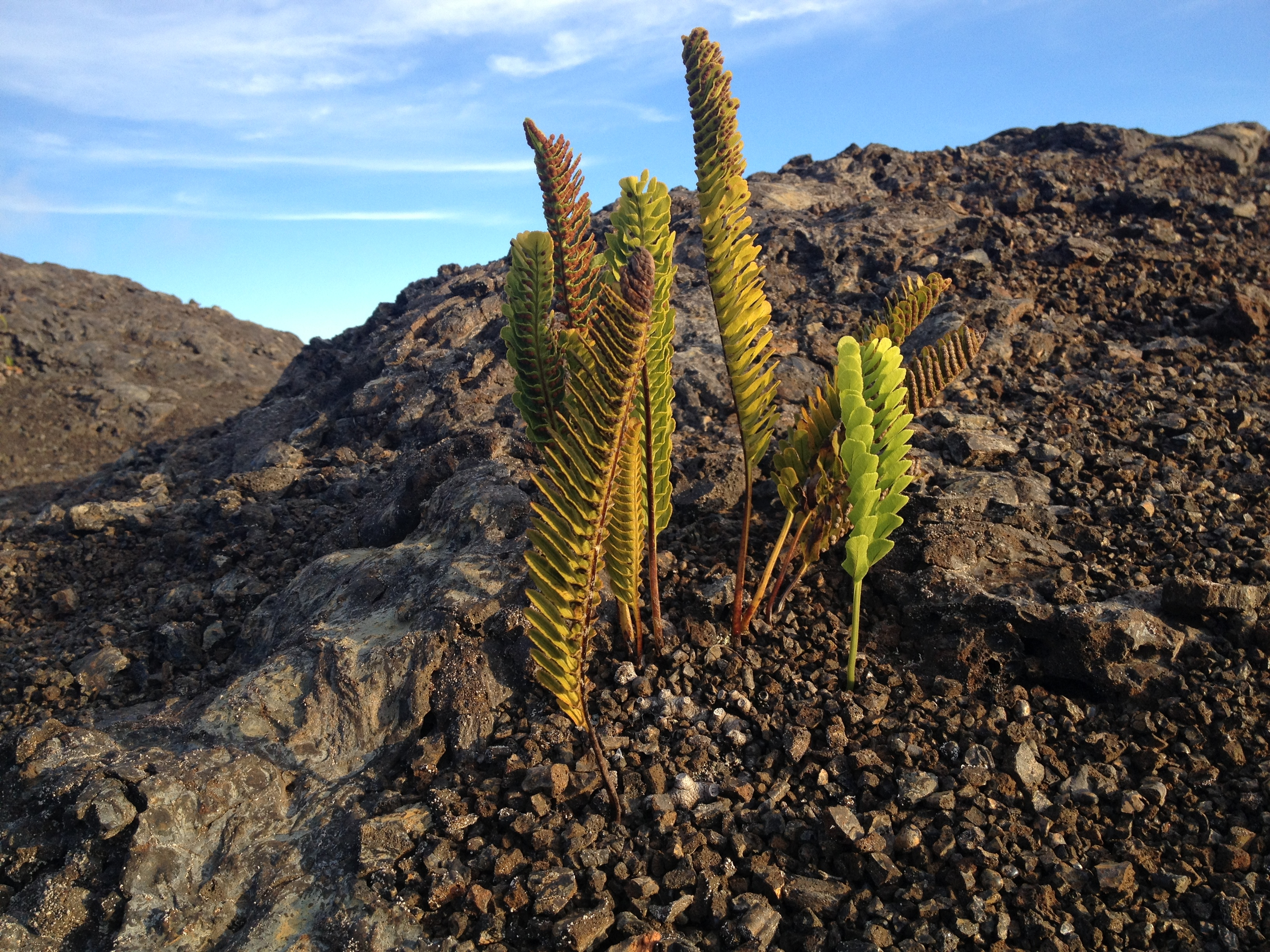

Scientific classification
- Kingdom: Plantae
- Clade: Tracheophytes
- Division: Polypodiophyta
- Class: Polypodiopsida
- Order: Polypodiales
- Suborder: Polypodiineae
- Family: Polypodiaceae
- Genus: Polypodium
- Species: P. pellucidum

Binomial name
- Polypodium pellucidum Kaulf.

= Polypodium pellucidum =

Species of plant

Polypodium pellucidum (ʻAe) is a species of fern which grows on lava flows in Hawaii.

== Description ==
It is one of the first plants to colonize a new lava flow and is often found growing in small cracks.

== Range ==
It is found only on the Hawaiian islands.

== Taxonomy ==
Polypodium pellucidum contains the following varieties:

- Polypodium pellucidum var. acuminatum
- Polypodium pellucidum var. pellucidum
