= Polypodium ensiforme =

Scientific classification
- Kingdom: Plantae
- Clade: Tracheophytes
- Division: Polypodiophyta
- Class: Polypodiopsida
- Order: Polypodiales
- Suborder: Polypodiineae
- Family: Polypodiaceae
- Genus: Polypodium
- Species: P. ensiforme

Binomial name
- Polypodium ensiforme Thunb.

Species of fern

Polypodium ensiforme is a species of fern.
