= Moranopteris achilleifolia =

Scientific classification
- Kingdom: Plantae
- Clade: Tracheophytes
- Division: Polypodiophyta
- Class: Polypodiopsida
- Order: Polypodiales
- Suborder: Polypodiineae
- Family: Polypodiaceae
- Genus: Moranopteris
- Species: M. achilleifolia

Binomial name
- Moranopteris achilleifolia (Kaulf.) R.Y.Hirai & J.Prado

Synonyms
- Ctenopteris achilleifolium (Kaulf.) J.Sm.; Grammitis achilleifolia (Kaulf.) R.M.Tryon & A.F.Tryon; Micropolypodium achilleifolium (Kaulf.) Labiak & F.B.Matos; Polypodium achilleifolium Kaulf.; Polypodium piligerum Hook.; Terpsichore achilleifolia (Kaulf.) A.R.Sm.

Species of fern

Moranopteris achilleifolia is a species of fern in the family Polypodiaceae. It is native to Brazil and Argentina. It is also placed in the genus Grammitis.

Under the synonym Polypodium piligerum, in 2003, it was regarded as endemic to Ecuador and threatened by habitat loss. However, more recent sources do not record it as occurring in Ecuador.
