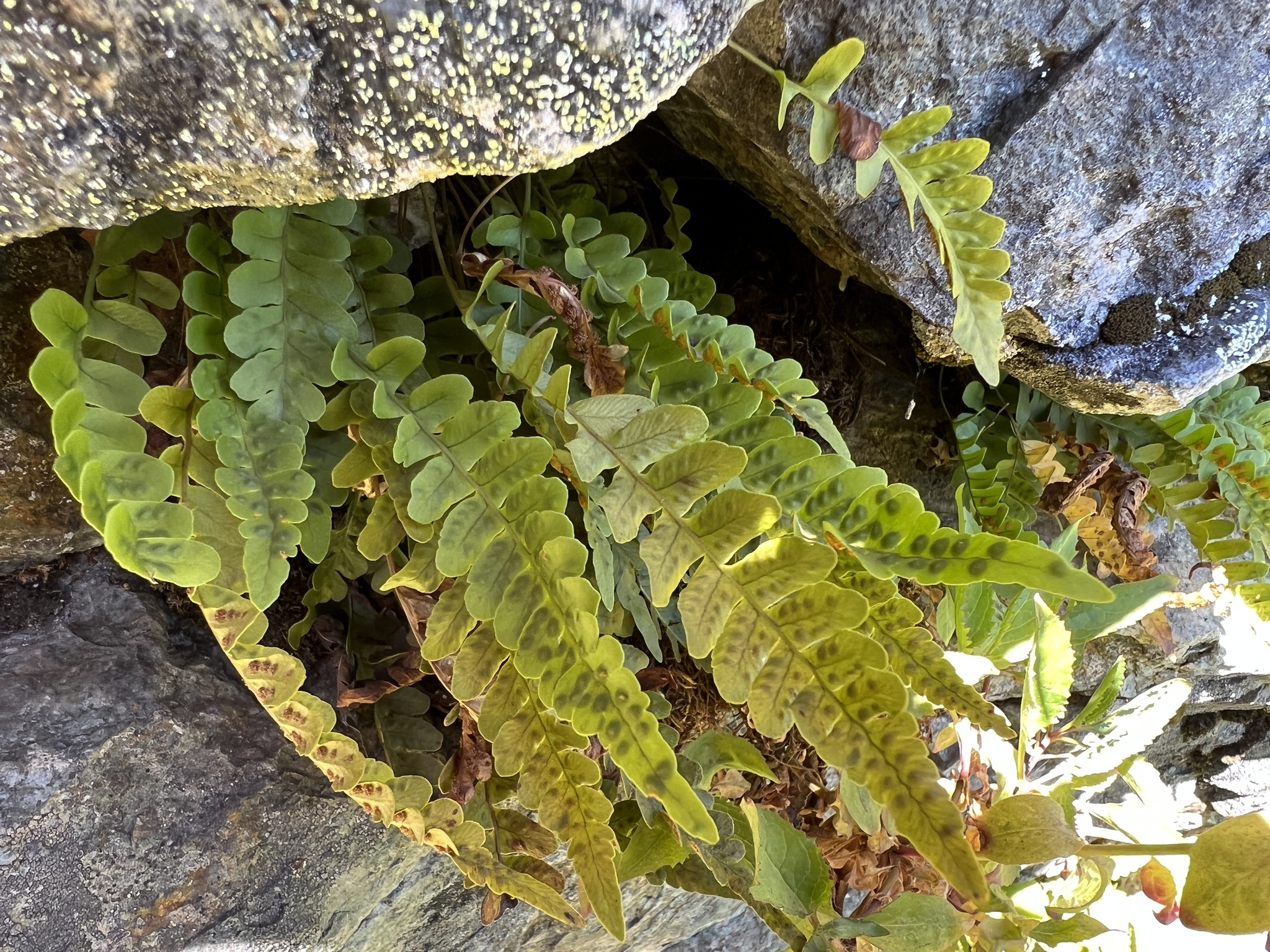

Scientific classification
- Kingdom: Plantae
- Clade: Tracheophytes
- Division: Polypodiophyta
- Class: Polypodiopsida
- Order: Polypodiales
- Suborder: Polypodiineae
- Family: Polypodiaceae
- Genus: Polypodium
- Species: P. amorphum

Binomial name
- Polypodium amorphum Suksd.

= Polypodium amorphum =

Species of fern

Polypodium amorphum is a species of fern with the common name irregular polypody, which grows near the northwest coast of North America.

== Description ==
Polypodium amorphum grows from a creeping rhizome, usually creeping along rock crevices. The rhizome has light brown scales that darken with age. The leaves arise singly from the rhizome (not forming a centralized tuft) and are up to 30 cm but usually much shorter. The petiole is slender, to 1.5 mm diam. Leaf blades are oblong to rarely deltate, up to 4 cm wide, somewhat leathery. The rachis is sparsely scaly to glabrous. Pinnule margins are entire to crenulate, with the apex rounded to broadly acute. The leaflets are usually shorter and more rounded than other Polypodium ferns that share its range. Sori are usually apparent from the top of the leaflets as bump-like protrusions. On the leaf underside, sori are midway between pinnule margin and midrib to nearly marginal, less than 3 mm in diameter, circular when immature. Sporangiasters with abundant glands are present nestled among the sporangia in spring and early summer, but are very small and can be seen only with close inspection with magnification. Polypodium amorphum differs from the similar Polypodium hesperium in having leaves that persist for two years and in the presence of sporangiasters.

== Range ==
This fern is native to the Pacific Northwest of North America, ranging from southern British Columbia to northern Oregon. It grows in the Olympics and on both sides of the Cascade crest, but on the drier (east) side only in damper spots at high elevation.

== Habitat ==
Polypodium amorphum grows mostly in moist rock crevices in mountains up to the subalpine zone.
