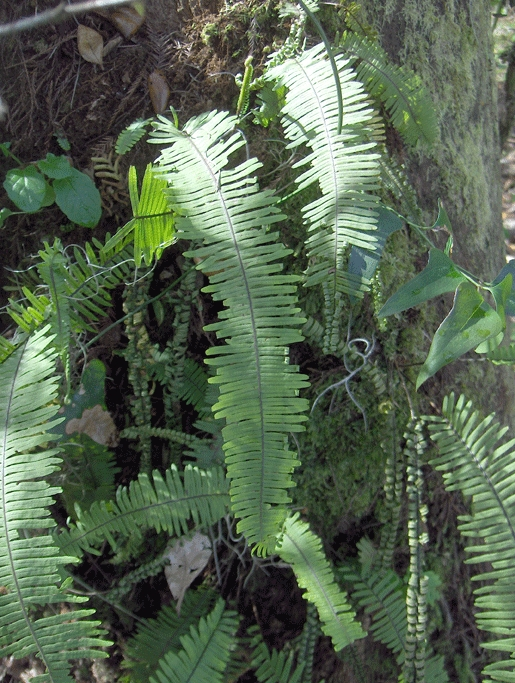
- Fronds of Pecluma plumula growing as an epiphyte

Scientific classification
- Kingdom: Plantae
- Clade: Tracheophytes
- Division: Polypodiophyta
- Class: Polypodiopsida
- Order: Polypodiales
- Suborder: Polypodiineae
- Family: Polypodiaceae
- Subfamily: Polypodioideae
- Genus: Pecluma; M.G.Price

Species
- See text.

Synonyms
- Polypodium subg. Pectinatum Lellinger

= Pecluma =

Genus of ferns

Pecluma is a genus of ferns in the family Polypodiaceae, subfamily Polypodioideae, according to the Pteridophyte Phylogeny Group classification of 2016 (PPG I). They are called rockcap ferns.

== Species ==
As of April 2025, Checklist of Ferns and Lycophytes of the World accepted the following fifty-one species:

- Pecluma absidata (A.M.Evans) M.G.Price
- Pecluma alfredii (Rosenst.) M.G.Price
- Pecluma atra (A.M.Evans) M.G.Price
- Pecluma barituensis O.G.Martínez & de la Sota
- Pecluma bermudiana (A.M.Evans) M.G.Price
- Pecluma bourgeauana (E.Fourn.) L.A.Triana
- Pecluma camptophyllaria (Fée) M.G.Price
- Pecluma celaquensis A.Rojas
- Pecluma chiapensis (A.M.Evans & A.R.Sm.) M.G.Price
- Pecluma chnoophora (Kunze) Salino & F.C.Assis
- Pecluma choquetangensis (Rosenst.) M.G.Price
- Pecluma consimilis (Eaton ex Mett.) M.G.Price
- Pecluma curvans (Mett.) M.G.Price
- Pecluma dispersa (A.M.Evans) M.G.Price
- Pecluma divaricata (E.Fourn.) Mickel & Beitel
- Pecluma dulcis (Poir.) F.C.Assis & Salino
- Pecluma eurybasis (C.Chr.) M.G.Price
- Pecluma ferruginea (M.Martens & Galeotti) M.G.Price
- Pecluma filicula (Kaulf.) M.G.Price
- Pecluma funicula (Fée) M.G.Price
- Pecluma hartwegiana (Hook.) F.C.Assis & Salino
- Pecluma hoehnei (A.Samp.) Salino
- Pecluma hygrometrica (Splitg.) M.G.Price
- Pecluma imbeana (Brade) Salino
- Pecluma insularis (Brade) Salino
- Pecluma liebmannii (C.Chr.) A.R.Sm. & Carv.-Hern.
- Pecluma longepinnulata (E.Fourn.) F.C.Assis & Salino
- Pecluma macedoi (Brade) M.Kessler & A.R.Sm.
- Pecluma oranensis (de la Sota) de la Sota
- Pecluma otites (L.) L.Regalado & A.R.Schmidt
- Pecluma paradiseae (Langsd. & Fisch.) M.G.Price
- Pecluma pastazensis (Hieron.) R.C.Moran
- Pecluma pectinata (L.) M.G.Price
- Pecluma pectinatiformis (Lindm.) M.G.Price
- Pecluma perpinnata M.Kessler & A.R.Sm.
- Pecluma pilosa (A.M.Evans) M.Kessler & A.R.Sm.
- Pecluma pinnatissima (R.C.Moran) L.Regalado & A.R.Schmidt
- Pecluma plectolepidioides (Rosenst.) A.Rojas
- Pecluma ptilotos (Kunze) M.G.Price
- Pecluma recurvata (Kaulf.) M.G.Price
- Pecluma rhachipterygia (Liebm.) F.C.Assis & Salino
- Pecluma robusta (Fée) M.Kessler & A.R.Sm.
- Pecluma sanctae-mariae L.A.Triana
- Pecluma schkuhrii (Raddi) Pic. Serm.
- Pecluma sicca (Lindm.) M.G.Price
- Pecluma singeri (de la Sota) M.G.Price
- Pecluma struthionis (L.) Boudrie, Cremers & Viane
- Pecluma sursumcurrens (Copel.) M.G.Price
- Pecluma truncorum (Lindm.) M.G.Price
- Pecluma ursipes L.Regalado & A.R.Schmidt
- Pecluma venturii (de la Sota) M.G.Price
