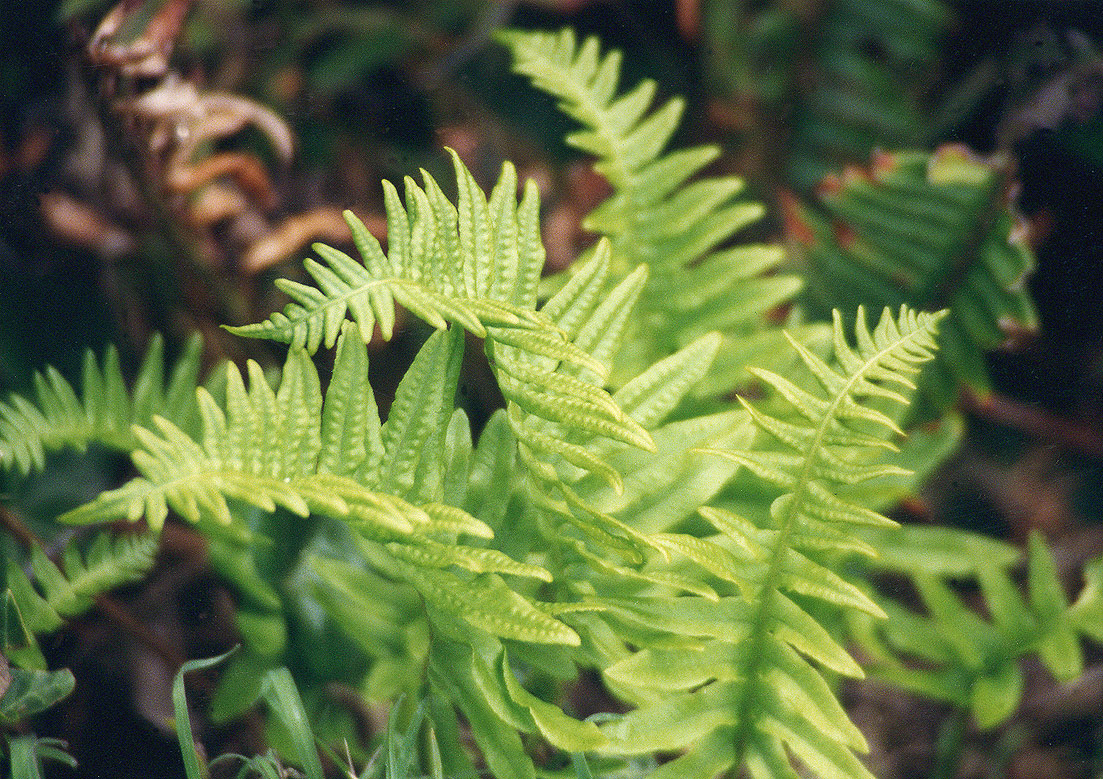

Scientific classification
- Kingdom: Plantae
- Clade: Embryophytes
- Clade: Tracheophytes
- Division: Polypodiophyta
- Class: Polypodiopsida
- Order: Polypodiales
- Suborder: Polypodiineae
- Family: Polypodiaceae
- Genus: Polypodium
- Species: P. californicum

Binomial name
- Polypodium californicum Kaulf.

= Polypodium californicum =

California polypody

Species of fern

Polypodium californicum is a species of fern known by the common name California polypody.

It is native to Baja California and California, where it grows along the coastline as well as in moist spots in coastal foothills and mountain ranges in the southern part of its distribution.

== Description ==
This polypody anchors with a scaly rhizome. It produces oval to triangular leaves up to 70 centimetres (28 in) in length and 20 centimetres (7.9 in) in width. Each leaf is made up of many dull-pointed lance-shaped segments which may be thin or firm or somewhat fleshy, and have lightly serrated edges. The underside of each leaf segment is lined with a double row of flattened or sunken sori, which contain the spores.
