= Pecluma dulcis =

Scientific classification
- Kingdom: Plantae
- Clade: Tracheophytes
- Division: Polypodiophyta
- Class: Polypodiopsida
- Order: Polypodiales
- Suborder: Polypodiineae
- Family: Polypodiaceae
- Genus: Pecluma
- Species: P. dulcis

Binomial name
- Pecluma dulcis (Poir.) F.C.Assis & Salino

Synonyms
- Chrysopteris dulcis (Poir.) Fée; Goniophlebium dulce (Poir.) Moore; Polypodium dissimile Griseb.; Polypodium dulce Poir.; Polypodium endresii Baker; Polypodium glycirhiza Fée; Polypodium quitense Baker; Polypodium sororium Humb.& Bonpl.ex Willd.

Species of fern

Pecluma dulcis is a species of fern in the family Polypodiaceae. It has a widespread native distribution from Mexico to Southern America. Under the synonym Polypodium quitense, it was regarded as endemic to Ecuador and threatened by habitat loss.

== Description ==
=== Gametophytes ===
The gametophyte of P. dulcis is cordiform (heart-shaped), becoming elongated as it grows, and sometimes branches. Unicellular marginal hairs are present. Orange and orange-brown unbranched rhizoids usually occur on the distal portion of the gametophyte but may appear elsewhere in larger specimens. Archegonia grow along the midrib of the elongated gametophyte or close to the apical notch (in the top of the "heart" shape). Antheridia appear mixed with them when they occur.
