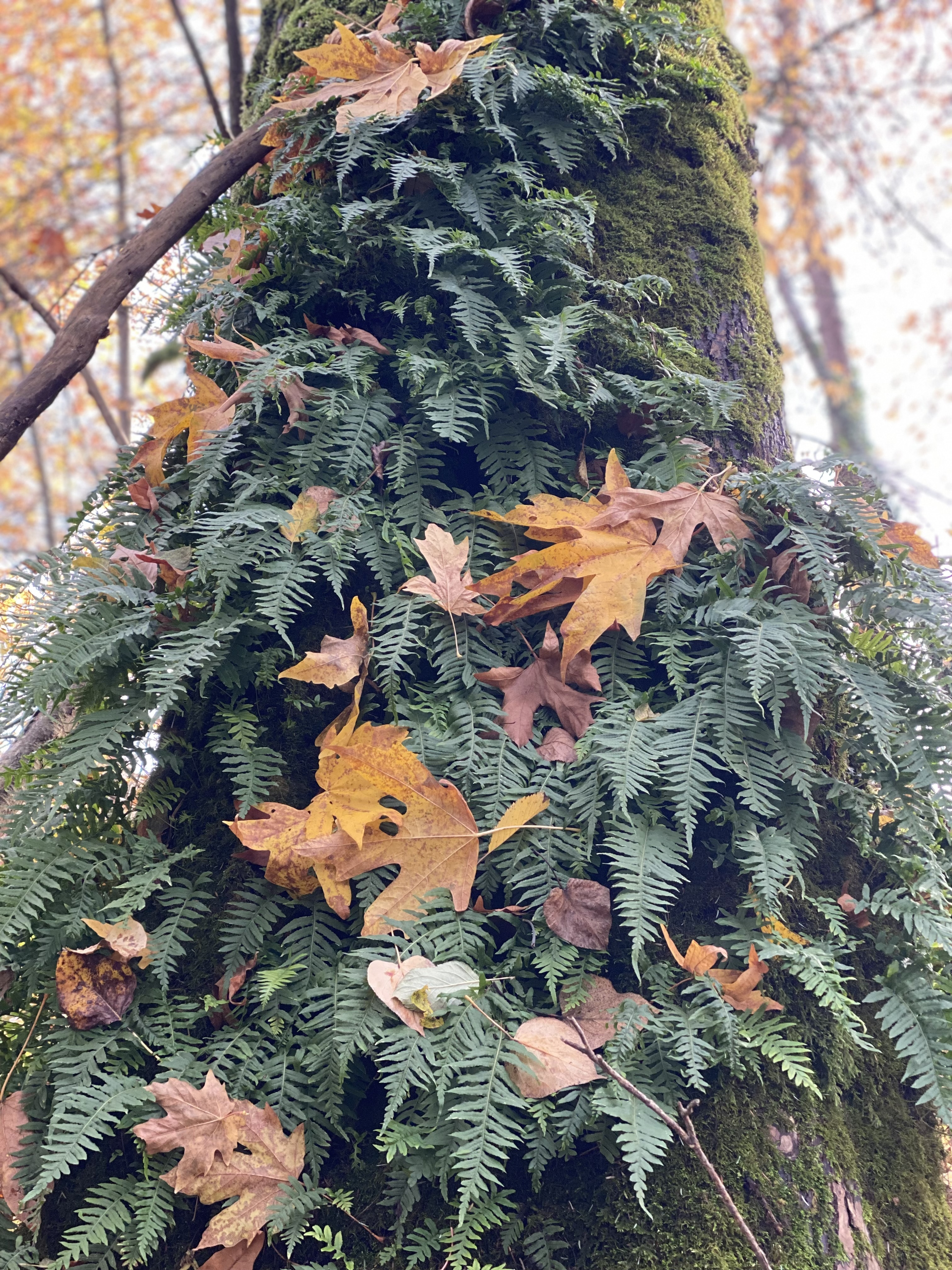
- Growing on bigleaf maple, Port Moody, British Columbia

Scientific classification
- Kingdom: Plantae
- Clade: Tracheophytes
- Division: Polypodiophyta
- Class: Polypodiopsida
- Order: Polypodiales
- Suborder: Polypodiineae
- Family: Polypodiaceae
- Genus: Polypodium
- Species: P. glycyrrhiza

Binomial name
- Polypodium glycyrrhiza D.C.Eaton

= Polypodium glycyrrhiza =

Species of fern native to North America

Polypodium glycyrrhiza, commonly known as licorice fern, many-footed fern, and sweet root, is a summer deciduous fern native to northwestern North America, where it is found in shaded, damp locations.

Spores are located in rounded sori on the undersides of the fronds, and are released in cool weather and high humidity.

== Description ==
Licorice fern grows single fronds scattered along a thick creeping rhizome; the genus name Polypodium (many-footed) refers to this characteristic. The fronds are once-divided and triangular in shape, with finely-toothed margins and pointed leaflets. They are usually at least one foot in length, but may grow to be over two feet long, and may be much smaller when growth conditions are less ideal. They also display parallel venation. When sori are present on the leaf underside, they correspond with small bump-like protrusions on the top side of the leaves. The rhizome is creeping and the fronds appear to have random placement, originating at various points. The rhizome appears reddish-brown, and has a sweet licorice flavor. Since it is a fern, P. glycyrrhiza reproduces by spores; the spores form in two rows of sori, which look like large spots on the undersides of the leaves. The sori range in color from yellow to orange to brown. Plants that are not thriving may have no sori or the sori may be patchy and will not appear in neat rows. Licorice fern may grow over the ground, rocks, or as an epiphyte, especially on moss-covered Acer macrophyllum.

The species is not closely related to the flowering plant from which the commercial product licorice is derived (Glycyrrhiza glabra).

== Etymology ==
The specific epithet glycyrrhiza refers to the pronounced licorice flavor of the rhizome. Glykys in Greek means sweet, while rhiza means root.

== Distribution ==
It occurs primarily in a narrow near-coastal strip in southern Alaska, southwestern Yukon Territory, western British Columbia, Washington, Oregon, and California, with a disjunct population in Idaho.

== Habitat and ecology ==
The plant prefers moist environments, so it is typically found on wet ground, rocks, moss-covered tree trunks in very wet areas, and logs. Occasionally it can be seen on fallen trees. It is particularly associated with bigleaf maple (Acer macrophyllum). The fern is mycorrhizal, meaning it can form root associations with the hyphae of fungi. It takes advantage of the mild, wet winters and the substrate of deciduous trees to photosynthesize and grow during the cold season when most other temperate plants are dormant. Habitat elevation is lowlands below 600 meters (2,000 ft).

== Chemistry ==
The sweet flavor of the rhizome was once attributed to the glycoside glycyrrhizin. However, a study has shown that the flavor may actually be due to polypodoside, which is 600 times sweeter than 6% sucrose solution.

== Cultivation ==
Licorice fern is cultivated as an ornamental garden plant. The cultivar 'Longicaudatum' has gained the Royal Horticultural Society's Award of Garden Merit.

== Uses ==
Licorice fern is chewed for flavor by numerous indigenous groups, including the Squamish, Shishalh, Comox, Nuxalk, Haida, and Kwakwaka'wakw. The rhizomes were also usually used medicinally as a treatment for the cold and sore throats.

== Gallery ==
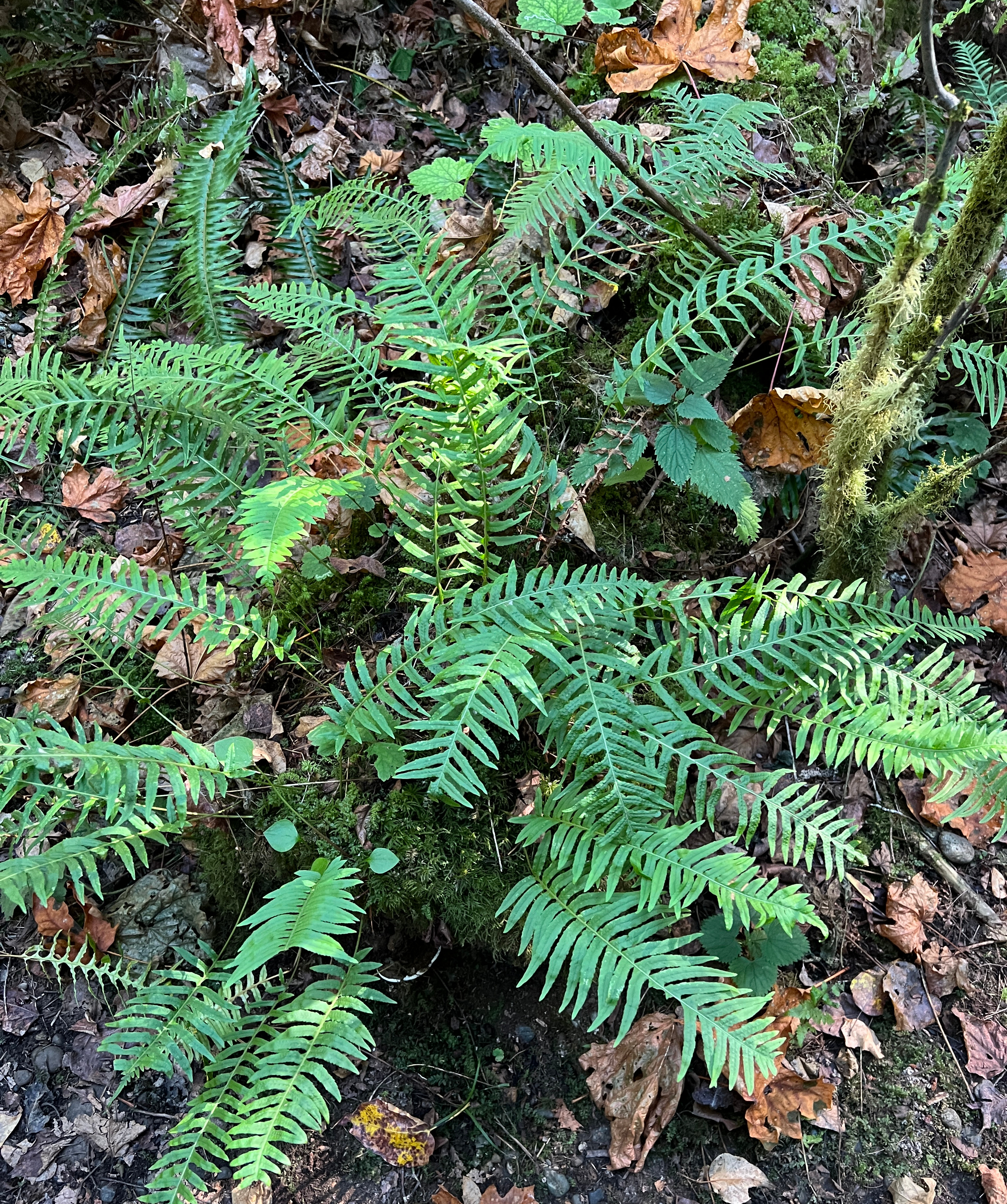
Growing on log

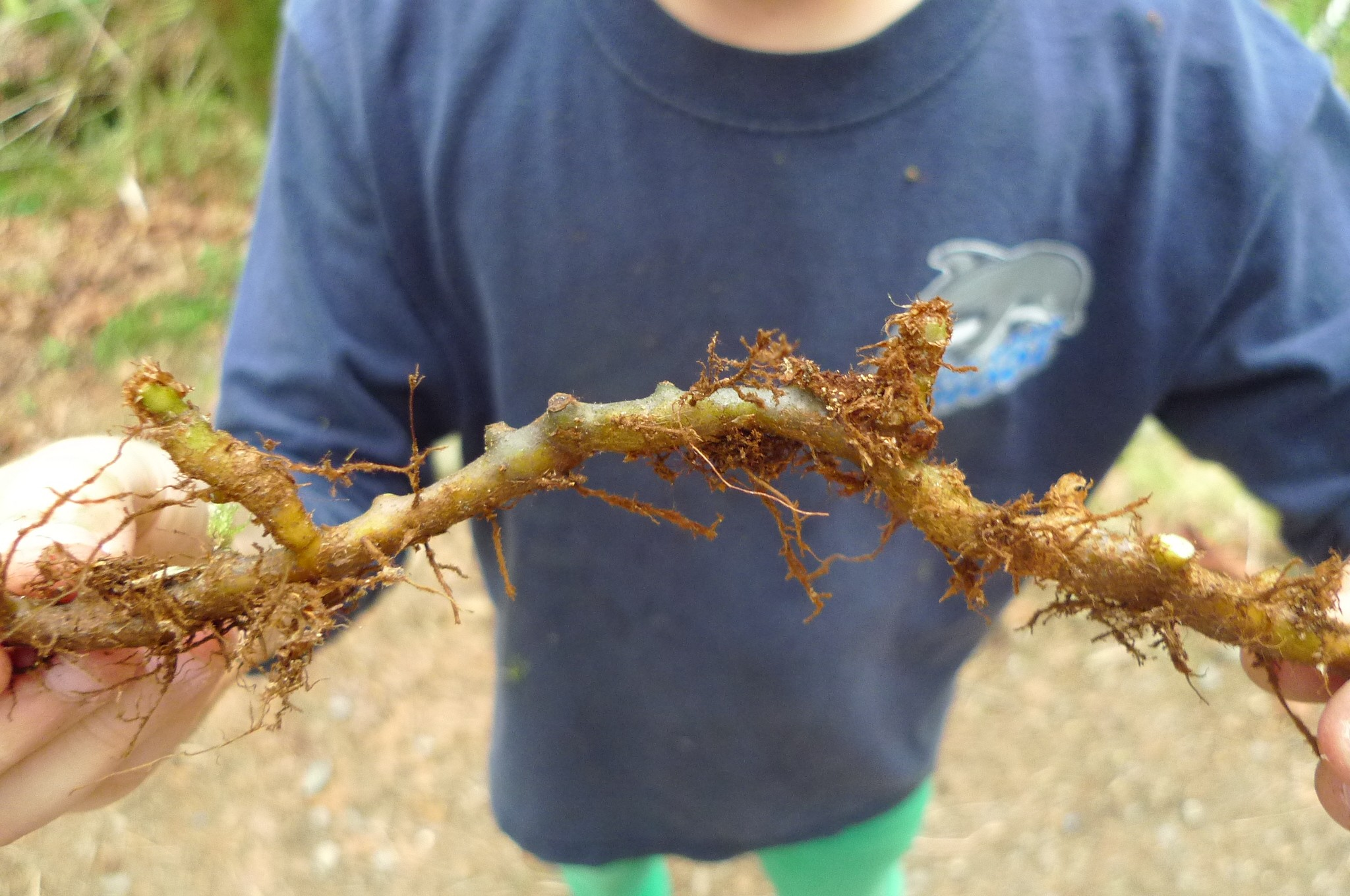
Rhizome close-up

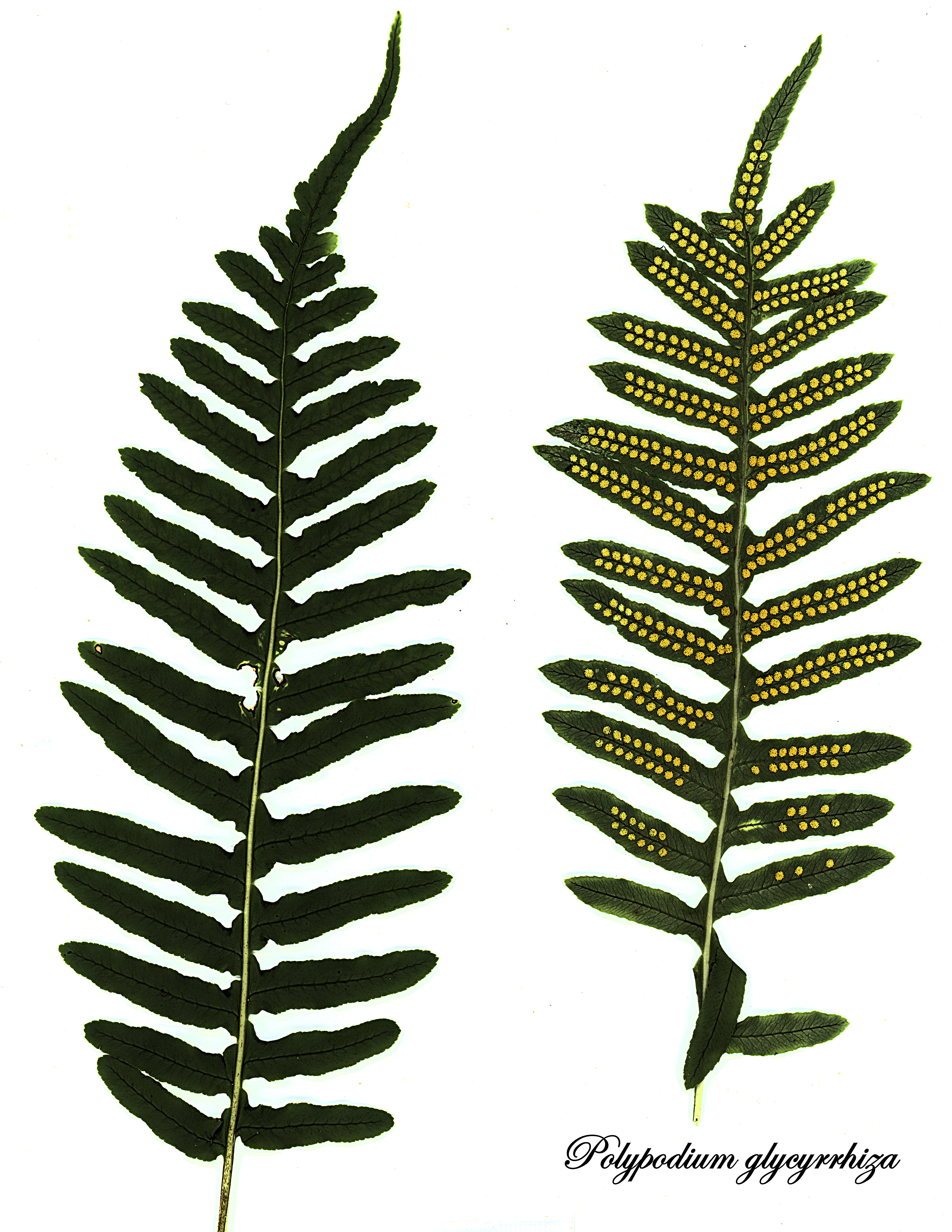
Fronds with and without spores

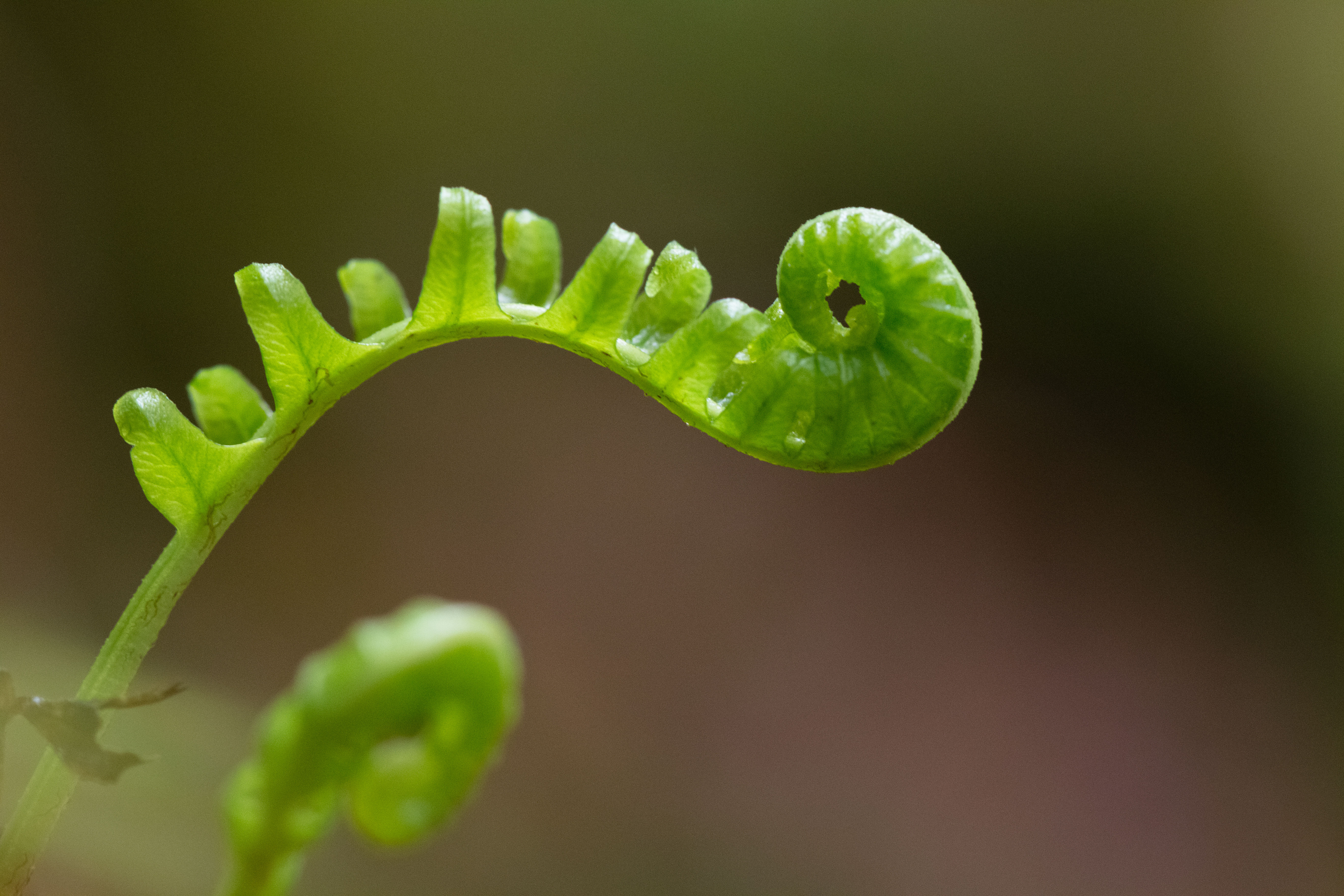
Young frond

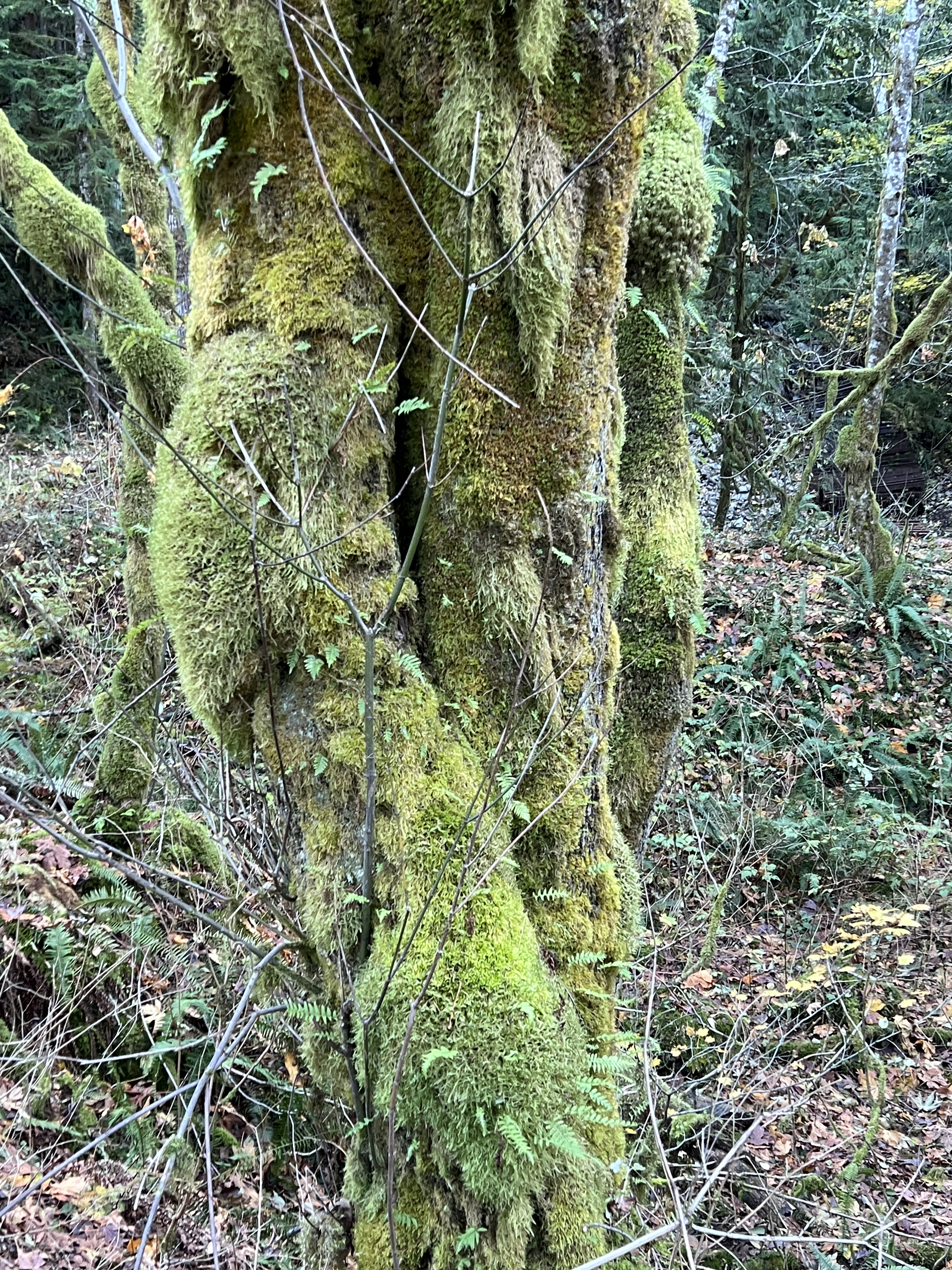
Growing on moss-covered big leaf maple

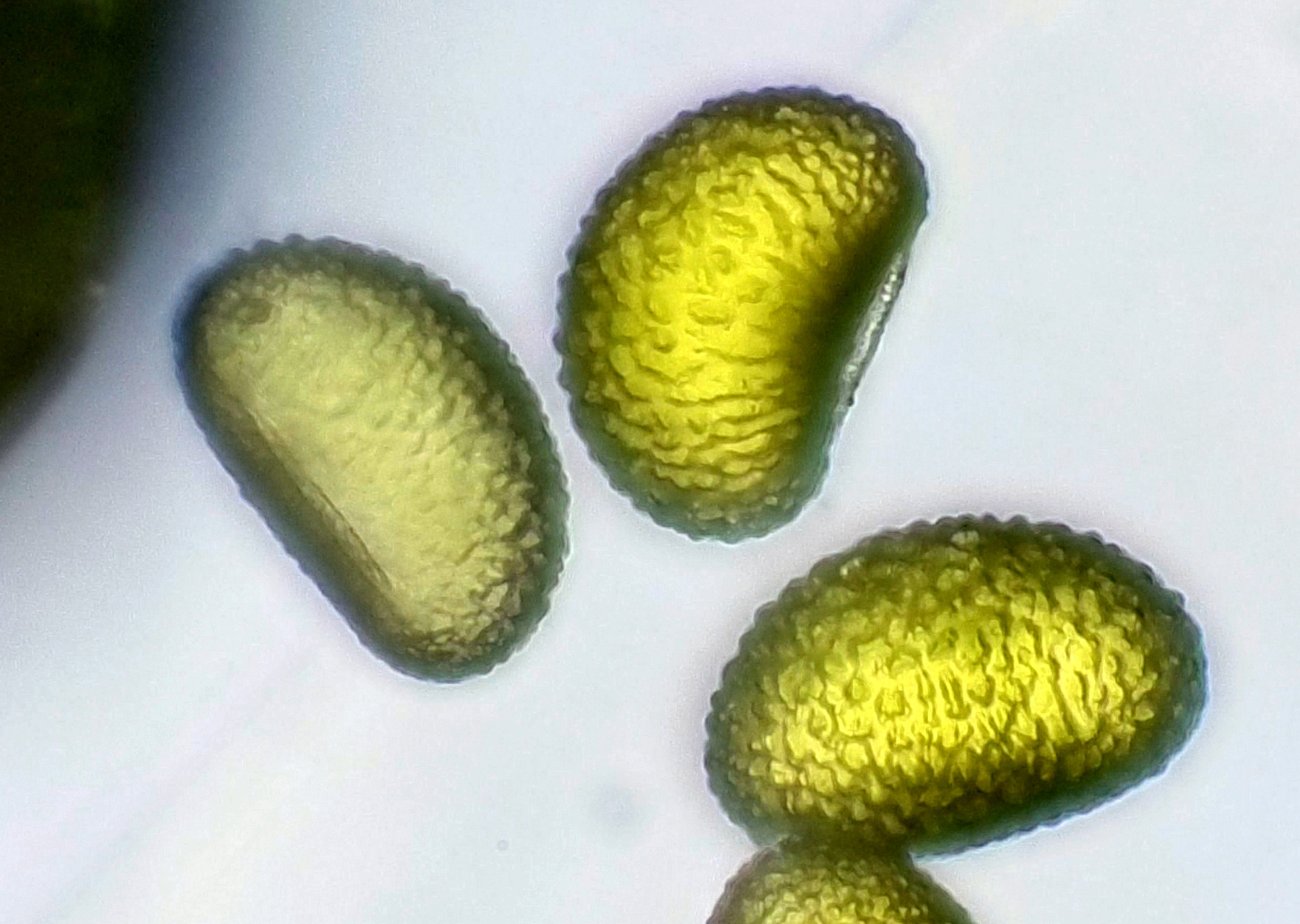
Spores under microscope (~0.1 mm)
