= List of ferns of Georgia (U.S. state) =

This is a list of ferns and other pteridophytes native to the U.S state of Georgia.

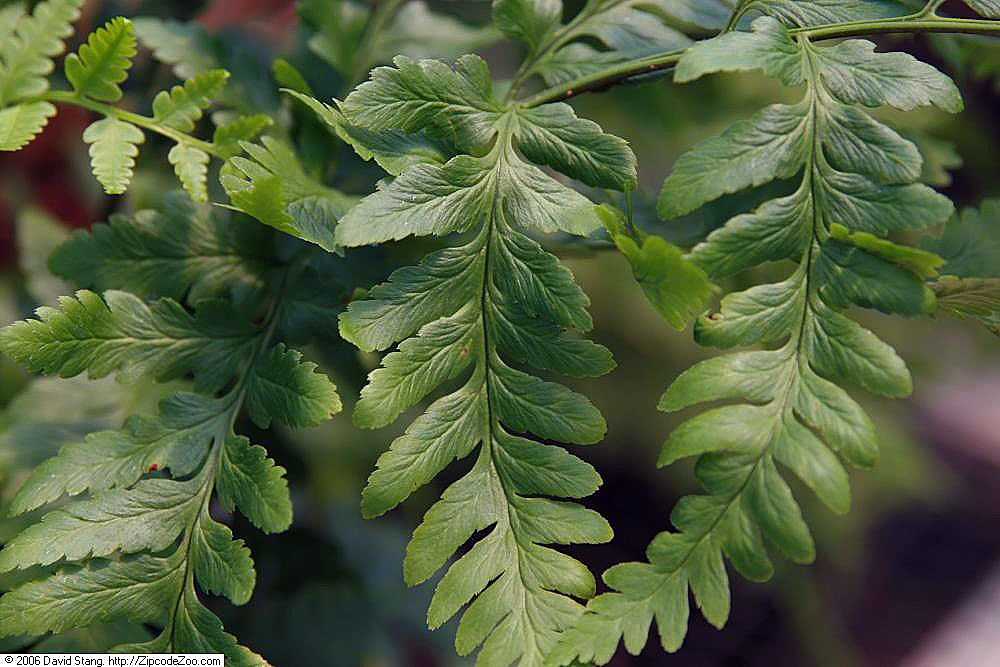
Dryopteris celsa, G4 - apparently secure

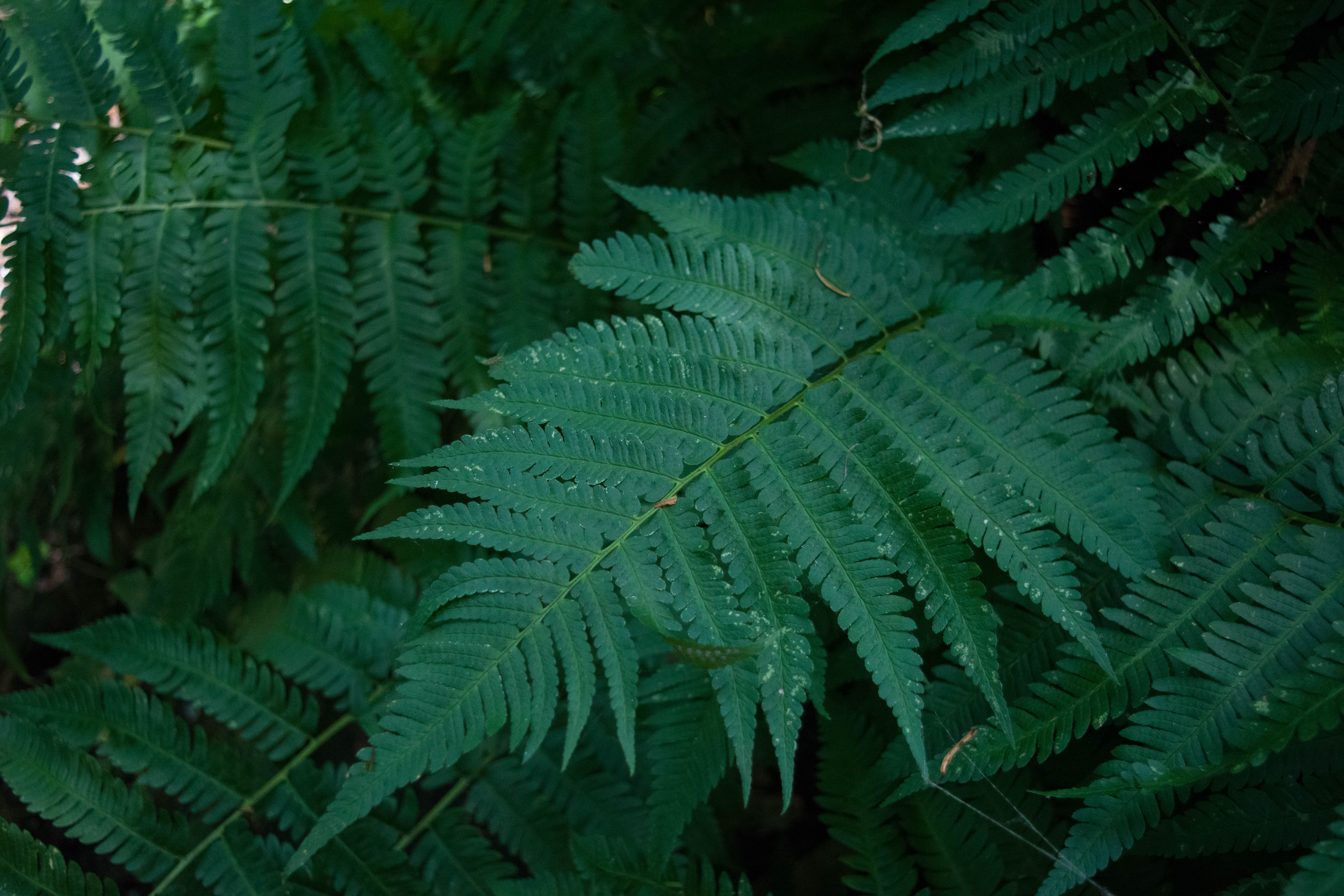
Dryopteris goldieana, G4 - apparently secure

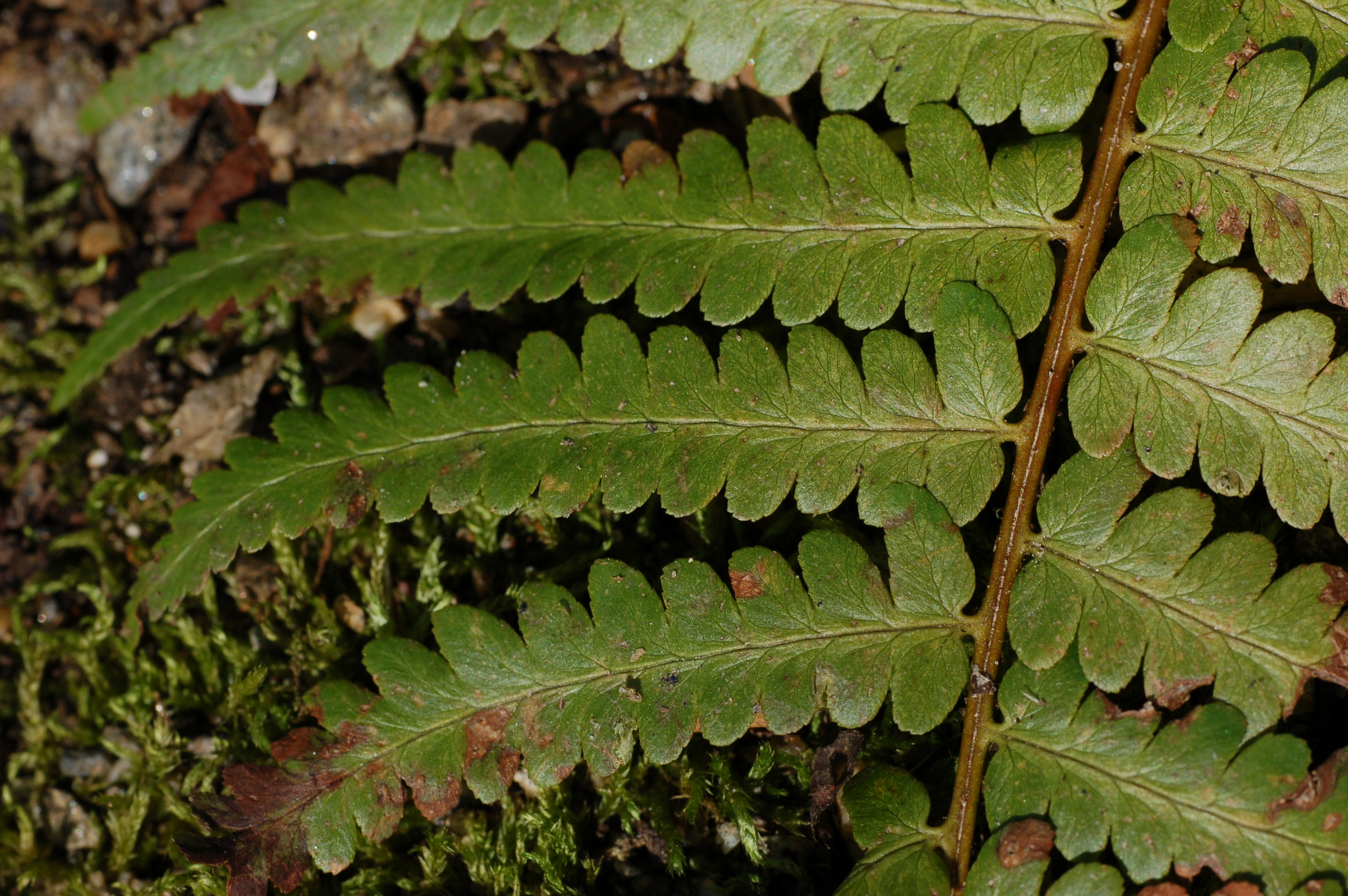
Dryopteris ludoviciana, G4 - apparently secure

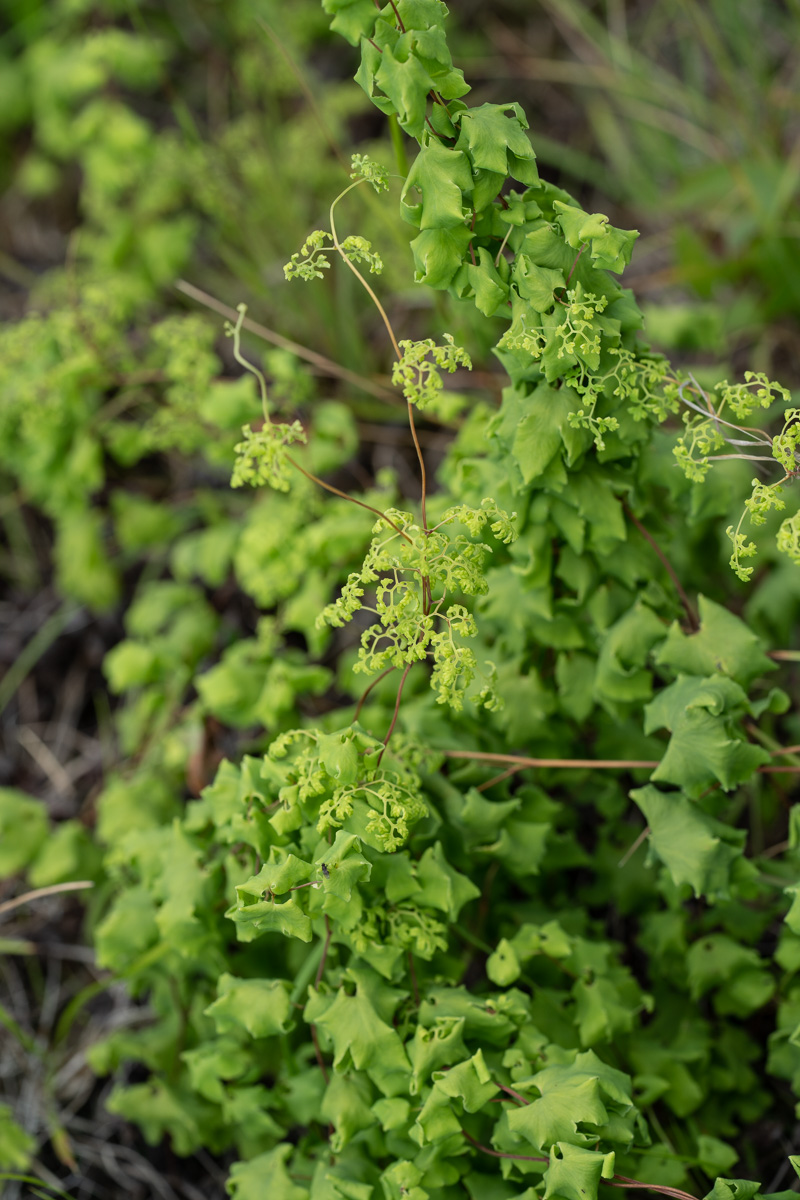
Lygodium palmatum, G4 - apparently secure

Family	Scientific name	Common names	Range within Georgia	Conservation status
Aspleniaceae	Asplenium montanum	Mountain spleenwort	Mountains	G5 - secure
Aspleniaceae	Asplenium platyneuron	Ebony spleenwort	State-wide except southeastern Coastal Plain	G5 - secure
Aspleniaceae	Asplenium resiliens	Black-stemmed spleenwort	Coastal Plain and in limestone valleys of northwest Georgia	G5 - secure
Aspleniaceae	Asplenium trichomanes	Maidenhair spleenwort	Piedmont and mountains	G5 - secure
Azollaceae	Azolla caroliniana	Carolina mosquitofern	Native with invasive potential; not recommended for culture. A blue-green algae useful for rice culture grows between its leaves.	G5 - secure
Blechnaceae	Woodwardia areolata	Netted chain fern	State-wide	G5 - secure
Blechnaceae	Woodwardia virginica	Virginia chain fern	Common in Coastal Plain, sporadically above the fall line	G5 - secure
Dennstaedtiaceae	Dennstaedtia punctilobula	Eastern hay-scented fern	Common in north Georgia mountains, south to metro Atlanta area	G5 - secure
Dennstaedtiaceae	Pteridium aquilinum	Bracken fern	Widespread, but invasive and poisonous, not recommended for culture	G5 - secure
Dryopteridaceae	Dryopteris celsa	Log fern	Northwestern Georgia	G4 - apparently secure
Dryopteridaceae	Dryopteris cristata	Crested wood fern	Fulton county	G5 - secure
Dryopteridaceae	Dryopteris goldieana	Goldie's wood fern, Giant wood fern	Northeastern mountain counties	G4 - apparently secure
Dryopteridaceae	Dryopteris intermedia	Evergreen wood fern, Fancy fern	North Georgia	G5 - secure
Dryopteridaceae	Dryopteris ludoviciana	Southern wood fern	South of the fall line, mainly in southwestern counties	G4 - apparently secure
Dryopteridaceae	Dryopteris marginalis	Marginal woodfern	North Georgia	G5 - secure
Dryopteridaceae	Polystichum acrostichoides	Christmas fern	Common state-wide except the pine flatwoods of southeast Georgia	G5 - secure
Dryopteridaceae	Physematium obtusum	Common Woodsia, Blunt-lobed woodsia, Cliff fern	State-wide, especially northern Georgia	G5 - secure
Lygodiaceae	Lygodium palmatum	Climbing fern, Hartford fern	Limited populations in the northern part of the state	G4 - apparently secure
Onocleaceae	Onoclea sensibilis	Sensitive fern	State-wide, but less frequent in southeastern Coastal Plain	G5 - secure
Ophioglossaceae	Botrypus virginianus	Rattlesnake fern	Northern Georgia, sporadically in southweastern and south central Georgia	G5 - secure
Ophioglossaceae	Sceptridium biternatum	Southern grapefern	Moist forests, clearings, and old fields	G5 - secure
Ophioglossaceae	Sceptridium jenmanii	Alabama grapefern	Moist and dry forests, and disturbed areas	G3 - vulnerable
Ophioglossaceae	Sceptridium dissectum	Cut-leaf grapefern	Moist forests, clearings, and old fields	G5 - secure
Ophioglossaceae	Sceptridium lunarioides	Winter grapefern	Northern Georgia in old fields, pastures, and young forests	G4 - apparently secure
Ophioglossum	Osmunda cinnamomea	Cinnamon fern	State-wide	G5 - secure
Ophioglossum	Osmunda claytoniana	Interrupted fern	Northern Georgia	G5 - secure
Ophioglossum	Osmunda regalis	Royal fern	State-wide	G5 - secure
Polypodiaceae	Pleopeltis polypodioides	Resurrection fern	State-wide	G5 - secure
Polypodiaceae	Polypodium virginianum	Common rockcap fern, Rock polypody	Northern Georgia	G5 - secure
Pteridaceae	Adiantum capillus-veneris	Southern maidenhair fern, Venus hair fern	Southwestern counties and a few Piedmont counties	G5 - secure
Pteridaceae	Adiantum pedatum	Northern maidenhair fern, Five-finger fern	Mountain and southern Piedmont counties	G5 - secure
Pteridaceae	Cheilanthes lanosa	Hairy lip-fern	Common from the granite region in the Piedmont north to the mountains	G5 - secure
Pteridaceae	Cheilanthes tomentosa	Woolly lip-fern	Northern counties on rocky, exposed sites	G5 - secure
Pteridaceae	Pellaea atropurpurea	Purple cliff-brake fern	Mainly in Ridge and Valley counties	G5 - secure
Thelypteridaceae	Phegopteris hexagonoptera	Broad beech fern	Common in northern Georgia, sometimes in southwestern Georgia	G5 - secure
Thelypteridaceae	Thelypteris kunthii	Southern maiden fern	Common in southern Georgia	G5 - secure
Thelypteridaceae	Thelypteris noveboracensis	New York fern	Common in northwestern Georgia	G5 - secure
Thelypteridaceae	Thelypteris ovata	Ovate maiden fern	Coastal Plain	G4 - apparently secure
Thelypteridaceae	Thelypteris palustris	Marsh fern	State-wide, in bogs and marshes	G5 - secure
Woodsiaceae	Athyrium asplenioides	Southern lady fern	State-wide, except pine flatwoods of southwest Georgia	Unknown
Woodsiaceae	Cystopteris bulbifera	Bulblet bladder fern	Restricted to a few mountainous sites in the northwest corner of the state	G5 - secure
Woodsiaceae	Cystopteris protrusa	Woodland fragile fern	Northern counties	G5 - secure
Woodsiaceae	Deparia acrostichoides	Silvery spleenwort	Northern counties	G5 - secure
Woodsiaceae	Diplazium pycnocarpon	Glade Fern	A few northern counties	G5 - secure
