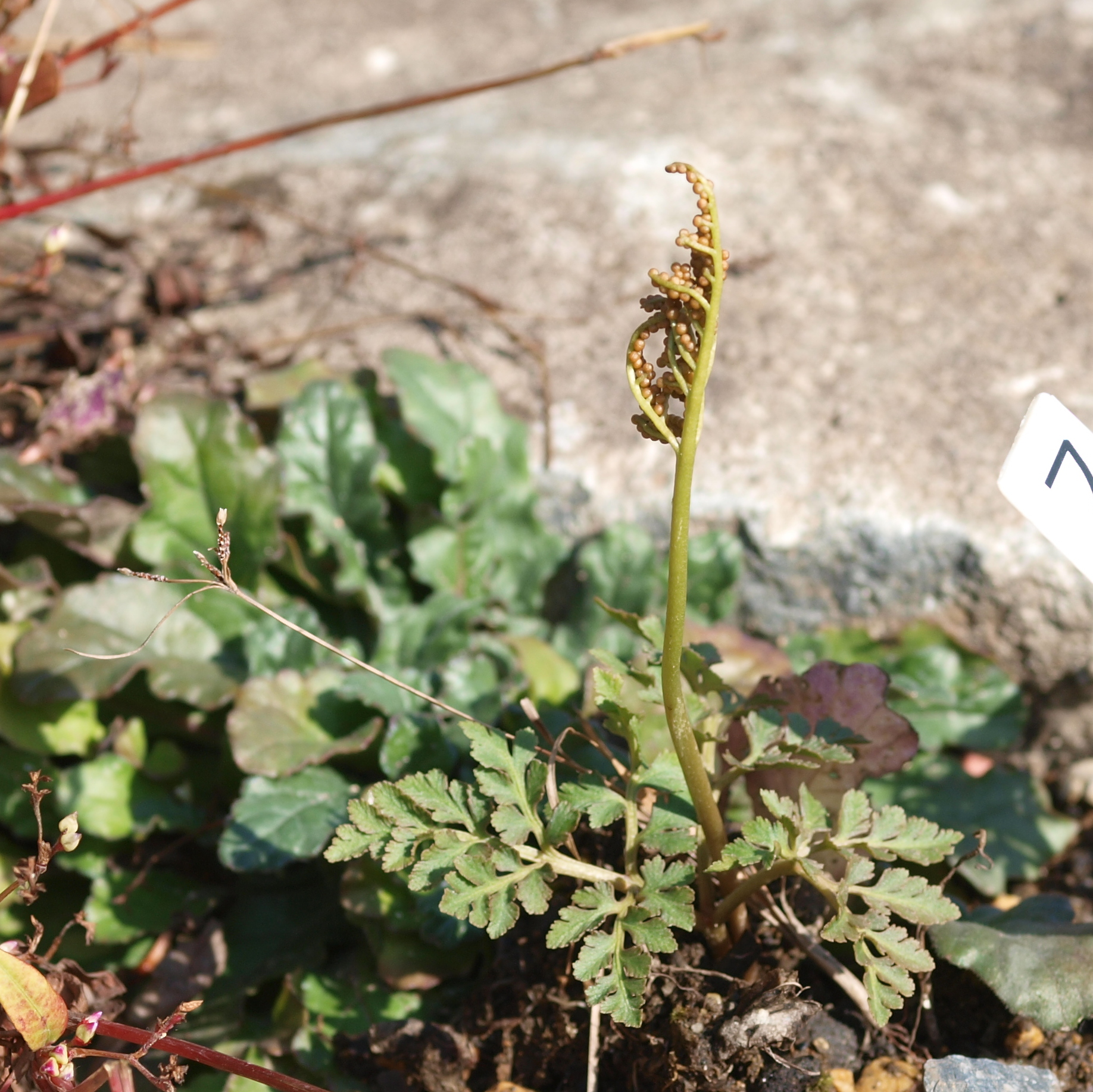

Conservation status
- Vulnerable (NatureServe)

Scientific classification
- Kingdom: Plantae
- Clade: Tracheophytes
- Division: Polypodiophyta
- Class: Polypodiopsida
- Order: Ophioglossales
- Family: Ophioglossaceae
- Genus: Sceptridium
- Species: S. rugulosum

Binomial name
- Sceptridium rugulosum (W.H.Wagner) Škoda & Holub

= Sceptridium rugulosum =

Species of plant

Sceptridium rugulosum, also known as St. Lawrence grapefern, is a species of fern in the adder's-tongue family Ophioglossaceae. It is native to the Great Lakes region and adjacent St. Lawrence River valley in eastern North America. It grows alongside other species of grapeferns, the most similar being the leathery grapefern (Sceptridium multifidum). The specific epithet rugulosum means "somewhat wrinkled", a characteristic of its leaves. To emphasize this distinguishing feature, it is sometimes referred to as the rugulose grapefern or more simply as the wrinkled grapefern. For historical reasons, it is also known as the ternate grapefern, not to be confused with an Asian species bearing the same name.

== Description ==
Sceptridium rugulosum is similar in appearance to Sceptridium multifidum but the latter is a larger plant overall. The size of the largest leaf segment (pinnule) is an important determining factor.

	Sceptridium rugulosum	Sceptridium multifidum
Size of largest pinnule	4 to 9 mm long and 2 to 5 mm wide	9 to 17 mm long and 4 to 8 mm wide
Tips of pinnules	Mostly angular	Mostly rounded
Edges of pinnules	Noticeably toothed	More commonly smooth or scalloped, sometimes obscurely or irregularly toothed
Veins of pinnules	Fairly prominent, giving the surface a somewhat wrinkled texture	Not prominent, giving the surface a flatter texture

The leaves of S. rugulosum emerge in late May while those of S. multifidum appear in early May.

== Taxonomy ==
Sceptridium rugulosum was first described as Botrychium rugulosum by the American botanist Warren Herbert Wagner in 1982. Its type specimen was collected in an open, dry, sandy field in Midland County, Michigan in 1959. The taxon was placed in genus Sceptridium by the Czech botanists Bohdan Škoda and Josef Holub in 1997. Sceptridium is recognized as a distinct genus in family Ophioglossaceae by the Pteridophyte Phylogeny Group classification of 2016. As of November 2026, the name Sceptridium rugulosum (W.H.Wagner) Škoda & Holub is accepted by various naming authorities. However, the name Botrychium rugulosum W.H.Wagner is still widely used.

In 1939, the American botanist Rolla Milton Tryon described a form of Botrychium multifidum with toothed leaf segments. Its type specimen was collected in Douglas County, Wisconsin. Wagner considered Botrychium multifidum f. dentatum R.M.Tryon to be a synonym of Botrychium rugulosum. Prior to Tryon, the latter was an overlooked taxon, with specimens identified as either Botrychium dissectum or Botrychium multifidum. Prior to 1900, all three species were referred to Botrychium ternatum, auct. non (Thunb.) Sw., an Asian species that does not occur in North America.

=== Etymology ===
The specific epithet rugulosum means "somewhat wrinkled, with small wrinkles", a reference to its leaf segments, which have a tendency to become more or less wrinkled and convex. The species is sometimes referred to as the "rugulose grapefern" or more simply as the "wrinkled grapefern".

The sterile frond of Botrychium rugulosum is often described as ternate, that is, compound with three leaflets (called pinnae). Historically, this led authors to equate the species with Botrychium ternatum (Thunb.) Sw., hence the common name "ternate grapefern".

== Distribution and habitat ==
Sceptridium rugulosum is endemic to eastern North America. Its range extends from the U.S. state of Minnesota at the western edge of the Great Lakes region along the St. Lawrence River valley to New Brunswick, Canada.

- Canada: New Brunswick, Ontario, Quebec
- United States: Connecticut, Indiana, Michigan, Minnesota, New York, Vermont, Wisconsin

The largest known populations occur in the U.S. states of Wisconsin and Michigan. It is found in low, moist habitats in brushy or grassy areas and in mossy areas of open forests.

== Ecology ==
The leafy sterile frond of Sceptridium rugulosum persists throughout the winter. The old leaves die as new leaves emerge in late May or June. A fertile frond emerges in late summer (if at all), with both fronds reaching maturity in September or October.

Sceptridium rugulosum is an obligate myco-heterotroph, that is, its survival depends upon a fungus, in this case a member of order Glomerales. The subterranean gametophyte is completely dependent upon the fungus for its nutrition. It is thought that the fungal relationship allows the fern to withstand repeated herbivory, prolonged dormancy, or growth in dense shade.

== Conservation ==
As of November 2026, the global conservation status of Sceptridium rugulosum is vulnerable (G3). It is vulnerable (S3) at best in all states and provinces in which it occurs. It is critically imperiled (S1) in New Brunswick, New York, and Vermont. It is presumed extirpated (SX) in Indiana. Reports from Connecticut and Prince Edward Island are likely false.

== Bibliography ==
- Bemidji-Grand Rapids 230 KV Transmission Line Project: Environmental Impact Statement. Minnesota Department of Commerce, Office of Energy Security and USDA Rural Development, Rural Utilities Service. 2010.
- Chadde, Steve; Kudray, Greg (2003). "Conservation assessment for ternate grapefern (Botrychium rugulosum)" (PDF). USDA Forest Service, Eastern Region. Archived from the original (PDF) on 2016-03-11.
- Gilman, Arthur V. (2002). Ophioglossaceae of Vermont. Bowdoin, Maine: V. F. Thomas Co. ISBN 0-9664874-4-3.
- Gilman, Arthur V. (2015). New Flora of Vermont. Memoirs of The New York Botanical Garden, Volume 110. Bronx, New York, USA: The New York Botanical Garden Press. ISBN 978-0-89327-516-7.
- Gledhill, David (2008). The Names of Plants (4th ed.). Cambridge University Press. ISBN 978-0-521-86645-3.
- Haines, Arthur (2011-11-08). New England Wild Flower Society's Flora Novae Angliae: A Manual for the Identification of Native and Naturalized Higher Vascular Plants of New England. Illustrated by Elizabeth Farnsworth and Gordon Morrison. Yale University Press. ISBN 978-0-300-17154-9.
- PPG I (2016). "A community-derived classification for extant lycophytes and ferns". Journal of Systematics and Evolution. 54 (6): 563–603. doi:10.1111/jse.12229. S2CID 39980610.
- Tryon, R. M. Jr. (1939). "Notes on the Ferns of Wisconsin". American Fern Journal. 29 (1): 1–9.
- Wagner, Warren H.; Wagner, F. S. (1982). "Botrychium rugulosum (Ophioglossaceae), a newly recognized species of evergreen grapefern in the Great Lakes area of North America". Contributions from the University of Michigan Herbarium. 15: 315–324.
