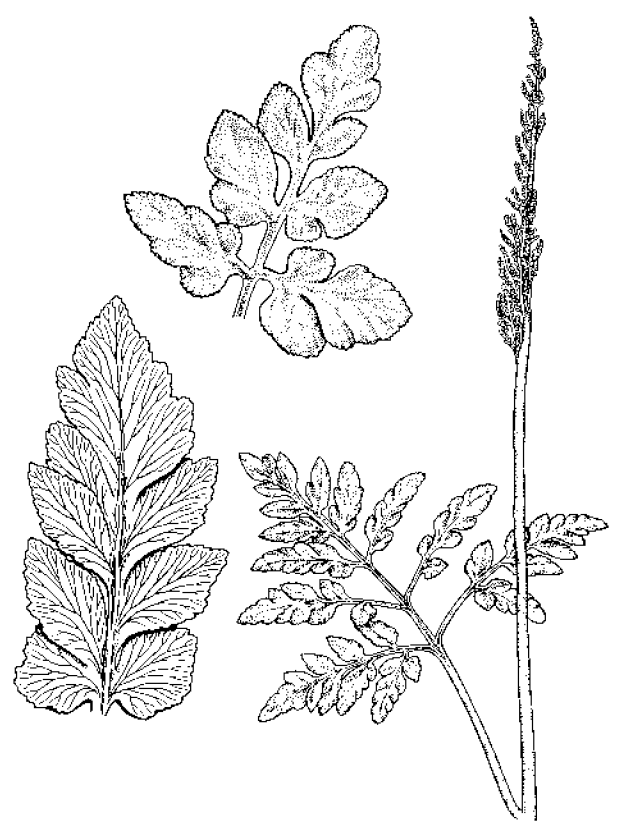

Scientific classification
- Kingdom: Plantae
- Clade: Tracheophytes
- Division: Polypodiophyta
- Class: Polypodiopsida
- Order: Ophioglossales
- Family: Ophioglossaceae
- Genus: Sceptridium
- Species: S. oneidense

Binomial name
- Sceptridium oneidense (Gilbert) Holub

Synonyms
- Botrychium dissectum var. oneidense (Gilbert) Farw.; Botrychium dissectum f. oneidense (Gilbert) Clute; Botrychium oneidense (Gilbert) House

= Sceptridium oneidense =

Species of fern

Sceptridium oneidense, the blunt-lobed grapefern, is a fern species in the family Ophioglossaceae.

== Description ==
The leaf blades of S. oneidense are ternately compound. The spores mature in late fall in panicles that rise above the sterile fronds.

== Taxonomy ==
At first, S. oneidense was considered a variety of Botrychium dissectum, then a form of it, then possibly a hybrid species. However, after a more detailed study by Wagner in 1961, it was considered its own species.

== Distribution and habitat ==
S. oneidense grows in moist woodlands in eastern United States and Canada from New Brunswick to Ontario and south to North Carolina. In Canada, it is a relatively rare species, usually only found in large groups of Botrychium obliquum.
