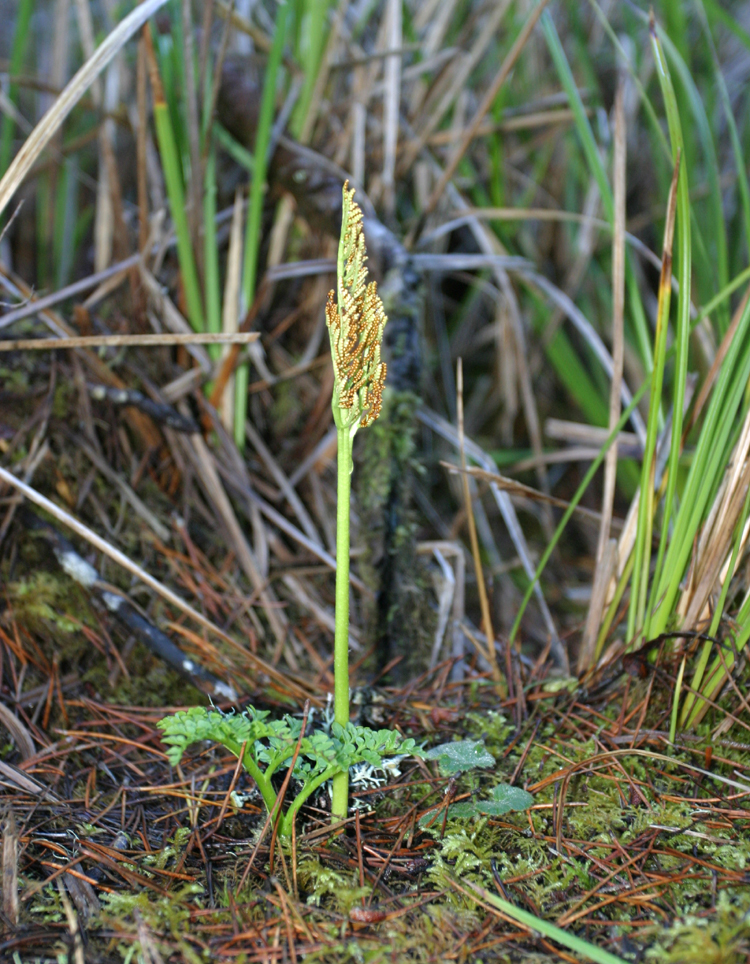

Scientific classification
- Kingdom: Plantae
- Clade: Tracheophytes
- Division: Polypodiophyta
- Class: Polypodiopsida
- Order: Ophioglossales
- Family: Ophioglossaceae
- Subfamily: Botrychioideae
- Genus: Sceptridium; Lyon

Type species
- Sceptridium obliquum (Muhl. ex Willdenow) Lyon

Species
- See text

Synonyms
- Holubiella Skoda

= Sceptridium =

Genus of ferns

Sceptridium is a genus of seedless vascular plants in the family Ophioglossaceae, closely allied to (and often included as a subgenus of) the genus Botrychium (the moonworts and grapeferns). It is also closely related to the genus Botrypus (the rattlesnake fern, often treated as the subgenus Osmundopteris under Botrychium). Sceptridium species are commonly called the grape-ferns.

These plants are small with fleshy roots, and reproduce by spores shed into the air. They differ from the moonworts in having at least some sterile fronds (all fronds in Botrychium are spore-bearing), and in the fronds being bi- or tri-pinnate (Botrychium are single pinnate, or rarely bipinnate); and from Botrypus in being evergreen, or at least winter-green (Botrypus are deciduous) and having the non-spore-bearing part of the frond long-stalked (short-stalked in Botrypus).

== Taxonomy ==
The Smith et al. classification of 2006, based on molecular phylogeny, lumped Sceptridium within Botrychium, in the Ophioglossaceae, which was continued in the Christenhusz et al. classification of 2011 and the Christenhusz and Chase classification of 2014. It is recognized as a distinct genus in Ophioglossaceae by the Pteridophyte Phylogeny Group classification of 2016 (PPG I).

== Phylogeny ==
Phylogeny of Sceptridium

- - (Hiemobotrychium)
    S. lunarioides (Michaux) Holub (winter grapefern)
  - (Sceptridium)
    - - S. schaffneri (Underwood) Lyon
      - - S. decompositum (von Martius & Gal.) Lyon
        - - S. daucifolium (Wallich ex Hooker & Greville) Lyon
          - - S. atrovirens Sahashi
            - S. formosanum (Tagawa) Holub
    - - - S. microphyllum Sahashi
        - - S. triangularifolium Sahashi
          - - S. × pseudoternatum (Sahashi)
            - - S. nipponicum (Makino) Holub
              - S. robustum (Rupr.) Lyon
      - - - S. multifidum (Gmelin) Nishida ex Tag. (leather grape-fern)
          - S. oneidense (Gilbert) Holub (blunt-leaved grape-fern)
        - - S. dissectum (Spreng.) Lyon (cut-leaved grape-fern)
          - - S. biternatum (Sav.) Lyon (sparse-lobed grapefern, southern grapefern)
            - - S. japonicum (Prantl) Lyon
              - S. ternatum (Thunberg) Lyon

Unassigned species:

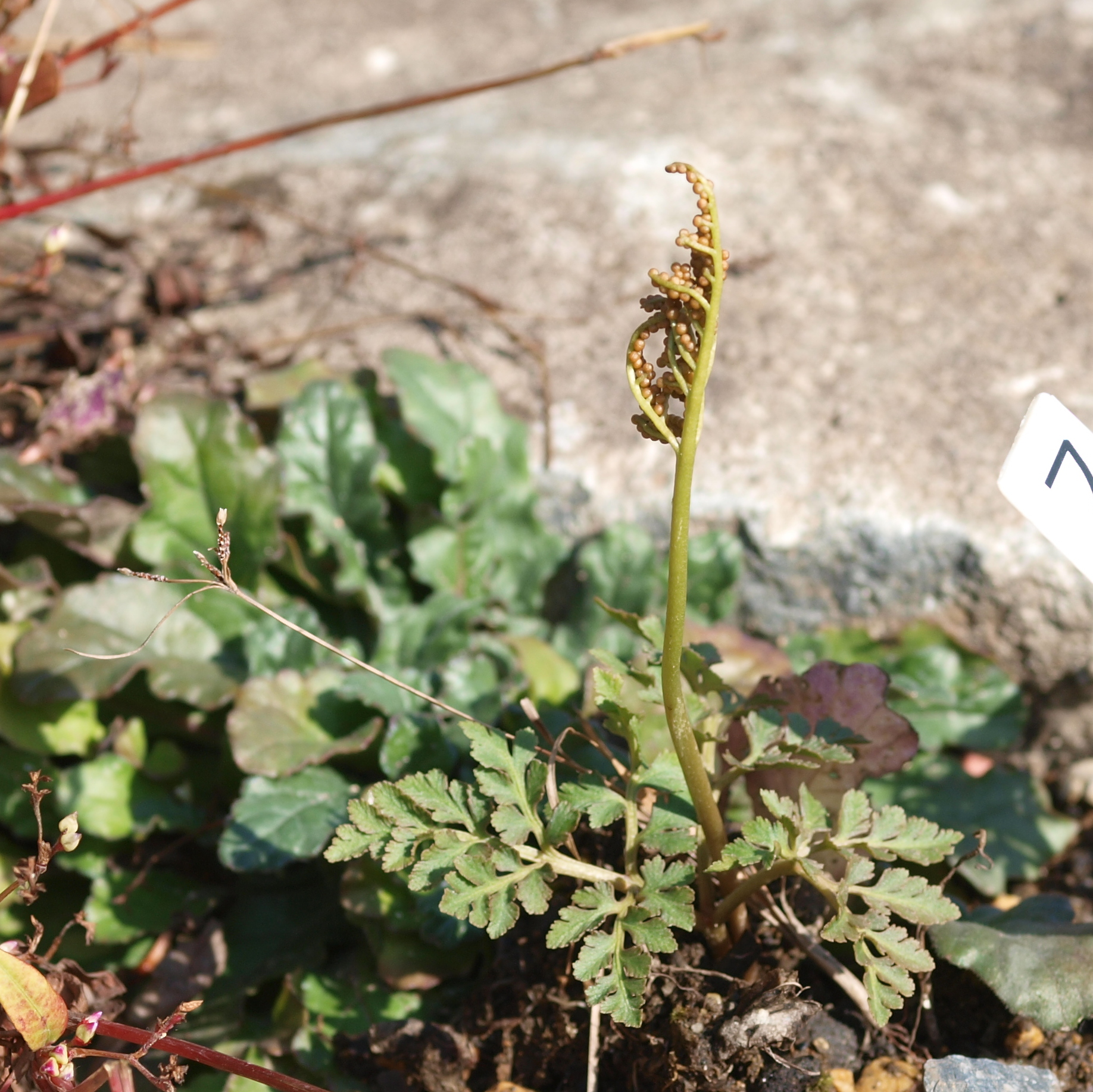
Botrychium rugulosum

- S. × argutum Sahashi
- S. australe (Brown) Lyon (parsley fern)
- S. biforme (Col.) Lyon (fine-leaved parsley fern)
- S. × elegans Sahashi
- S. javanicum Sahashi
- S. jenmanii (Underwood) Lyon (Alabama grape-fern)
- S. × longistipitatum Sahashi
- S. × pulchrum Sahashi
- S. rugulosum (Wagner) Skoda & Holub (ternate grape-fern, St. Lawrence grape fern, rugulose grape fern)
- S. × silvicola (Sahashi) Ebihara
- S. subbifoliatum (Brack.) Lyon (island grape-fern)
- S. underwoodianum (Maxon) Lyon
