= Osladin =

Names
- IUPAC name (22R,25S,26R)-26-(α-L-Rhamnopyranosyl)-3β-[α-L-rhamnopyranosyl-(1→2)-β-D-glucopyranosyloxy]-22,26-epoxy-5α-cholestan-6-one
- Systematic IUPAC name (1^{2}S,1^{3}R,1^{4}R,1^{5}R,1^{6}S,3^{2}R,3^{3}R,3^{4}S,3^{5}S,3^{6}R,5^{1}R,5^{3a}S,5^{3b}S,5^{5a}S,5^{7}S,5^{9a}R,5^{9b}S,5^{11a}S,6S,7^{2}R,7^{5}S,7^{6}R,9^{2}S,9^{3}R,9^{4}R,9^{5}R,9^{6}S)-1^{3},1^{4},1^{5},3^{4},3^{5},9^{3},9^{4},9^{5}-Octahydroxy-3^{6}-(hydroxymethyl)-1^{6},5^{9a},5^{11a},6,7^{5},9^{6}-hexamethylhexadecahydro-5^{5}H-2,4,8-trioxa-1,9(2),3(3,2),7(2,6)-tetrakis(oxana)-5(7,1)-cyclopenta[a]phenanthrenanonaphan-5^{5}-one
- Other names 26-O-α-L-Rhamnopyranosyl-(22R,25S,26R)-22,26-epoxy-6-oxo-5α-cholestan-3β,26-diol-3-O-α-L-rhamnopyranosyl-(1→2)-β-D-glucopyranoside

Identifiers
| CAS Number | 33650-66-7 |
| 3D model (JSmol) | Interactive image |
| ChemSpider | 8616159 |
| PubChem CID | 441890 |
- InChI: InChI=1S/C45H74O17/c1-18-7-10-29(59-40(18)62-42-38(55)35(52)32(49)21(4)57-42)19(2)24-8-9-25-23-16-28(47)27-15-22(11-13-45(27,6)26(23)12-14-44(24,25)5)58-43-39(36(53)33(50)30(17-46)60-43)61-41-37(54)34(51)31(48)20(3)56-41/h18-27,29-43,46,48-55H,7-17H2,1-6H3/t18-,19-,20-,21-,22-,23-,24+,25-,26-,27+,29+,30+,31-,32-,33+,34+,35+,36-,37+,38+,39+,40+,41-,42-,43+,44+,45+/m0/s1 Key: QZOALWMSYRBZSA-QZLZDTQYSA-N
- SMILES: CC1CCC(OC1OC2C(C(C(C(O2)C)O)O)O)C(C)C3CCC4C3(CCC5C4CC(=O)C6C5(CCC(C6)OC7C(C(C(C(O7)CO)O)O)OC8C(C(C(C(O8)C)O)O)O)C)C

Properties
| Chemical formula | C_{45}H_{74}O_{17} |
| Molar mass | 887.070 g·mol^{−1} |
| Appearance | White crystals |
| Melting point | 202 to 204 °C (396 to 399 °F; 475 to 477 K) |
| Solubility in water | Low in water. Soluble in ethanol. |
- Except where otherwise noted, data are given for materials in their standard state (at 25 °C [77 °F], 100 kPa). verify (what is ?) Infobox references

Osladine is a high-intensity sweetener isolated from the rhizome of Polypodium vulgare. It is a saponin, sapogenin steroid glycoside, 500 times sweeter than sucrose.

A related compound, polypodoside A, has been identified from Polypodium glycyrrhiza and is 600 times sweeter than a sucrose solution at 6%.

== See also ==
- Sugar substitute
- Glycyrrhizin
