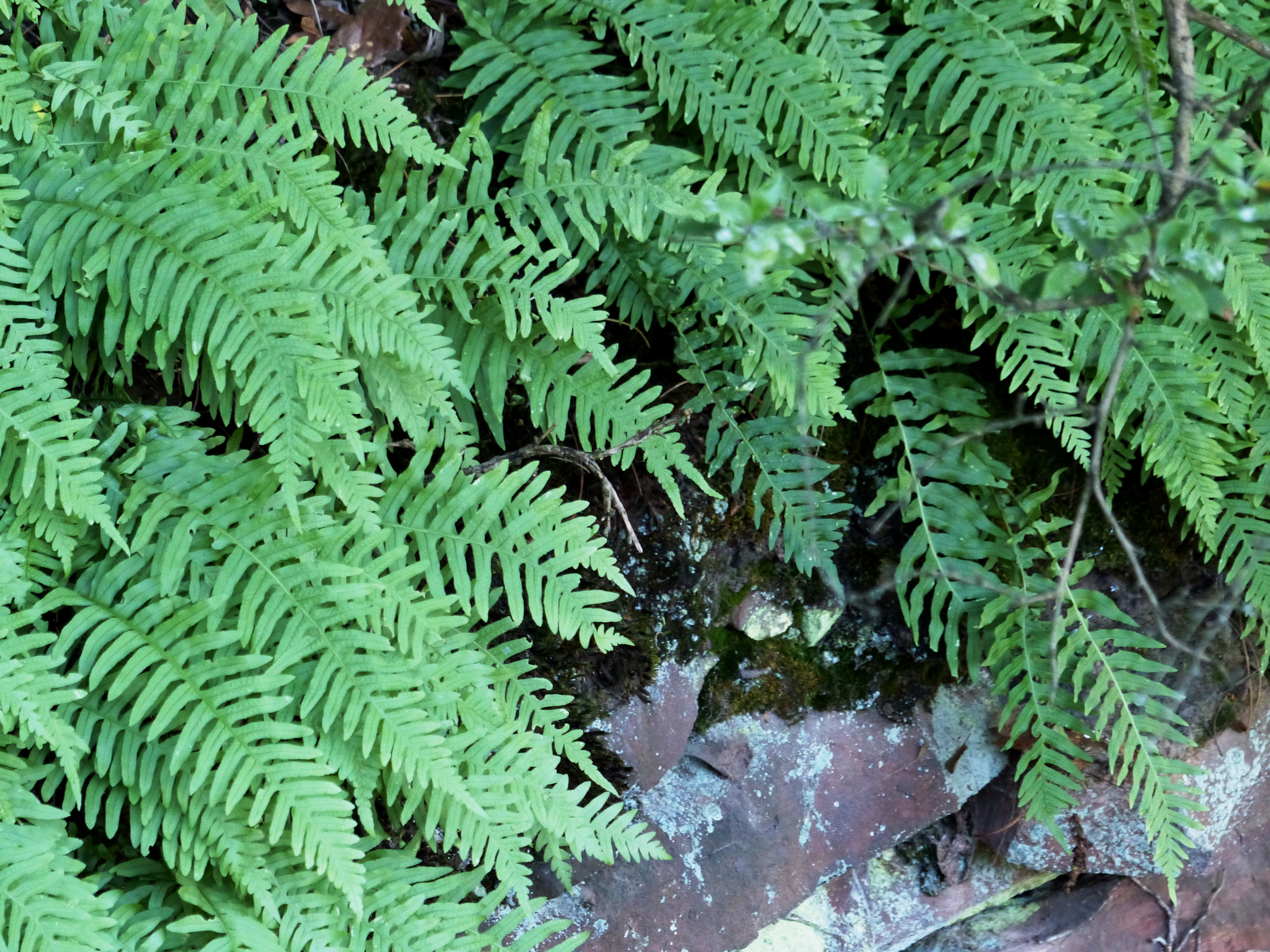

Scientific classification
- Kingdom: Plantae
- Clade: Tracheophytes
- Division: Polypodiophyta
- Class: Polypodiopsida
- Order: Polypodiales
- Suborder: Polypodiineae
- Family: Polypodiaceae
- Genus: Polypodium
- Species: P. vulgare

Binomial name
- Polypodium vulgare L.

= Polypodium vulgare =

Species of plant

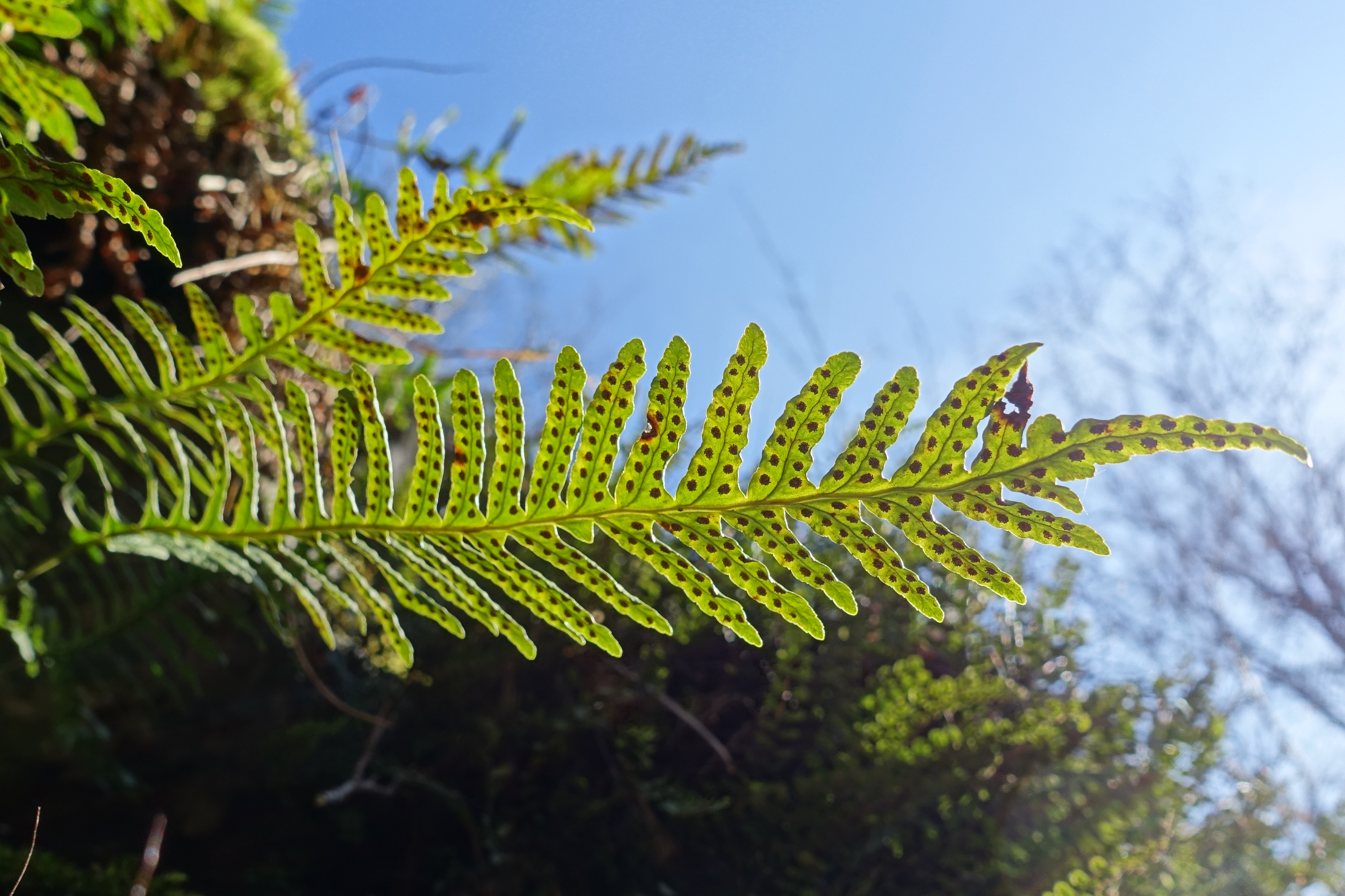
Frond with round dark sori on the underside

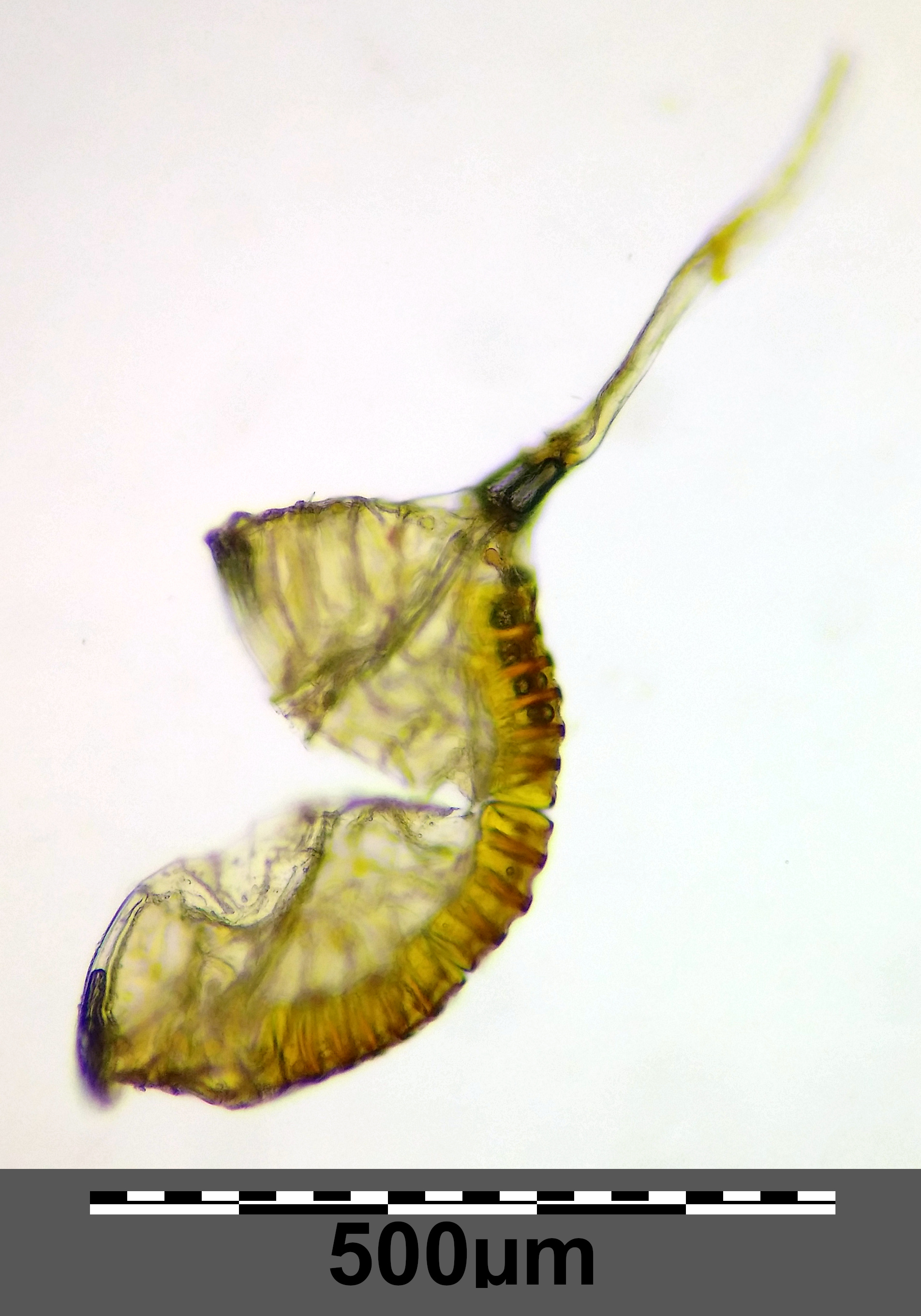
Sporangium showing the many thick-walled ('indurated') cells forming the backbone ('annulus') with 1 basal cell

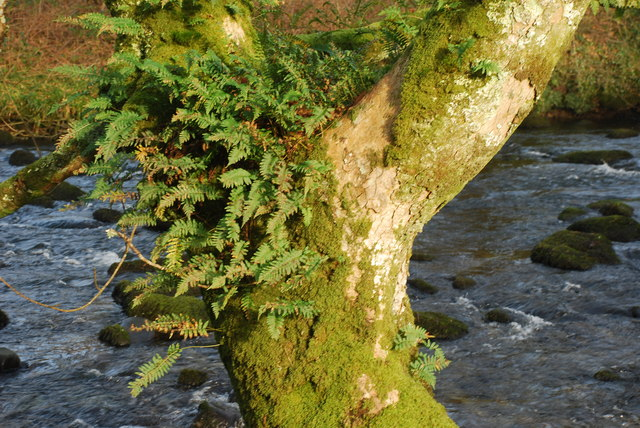
Frequently found on damp tree trunks

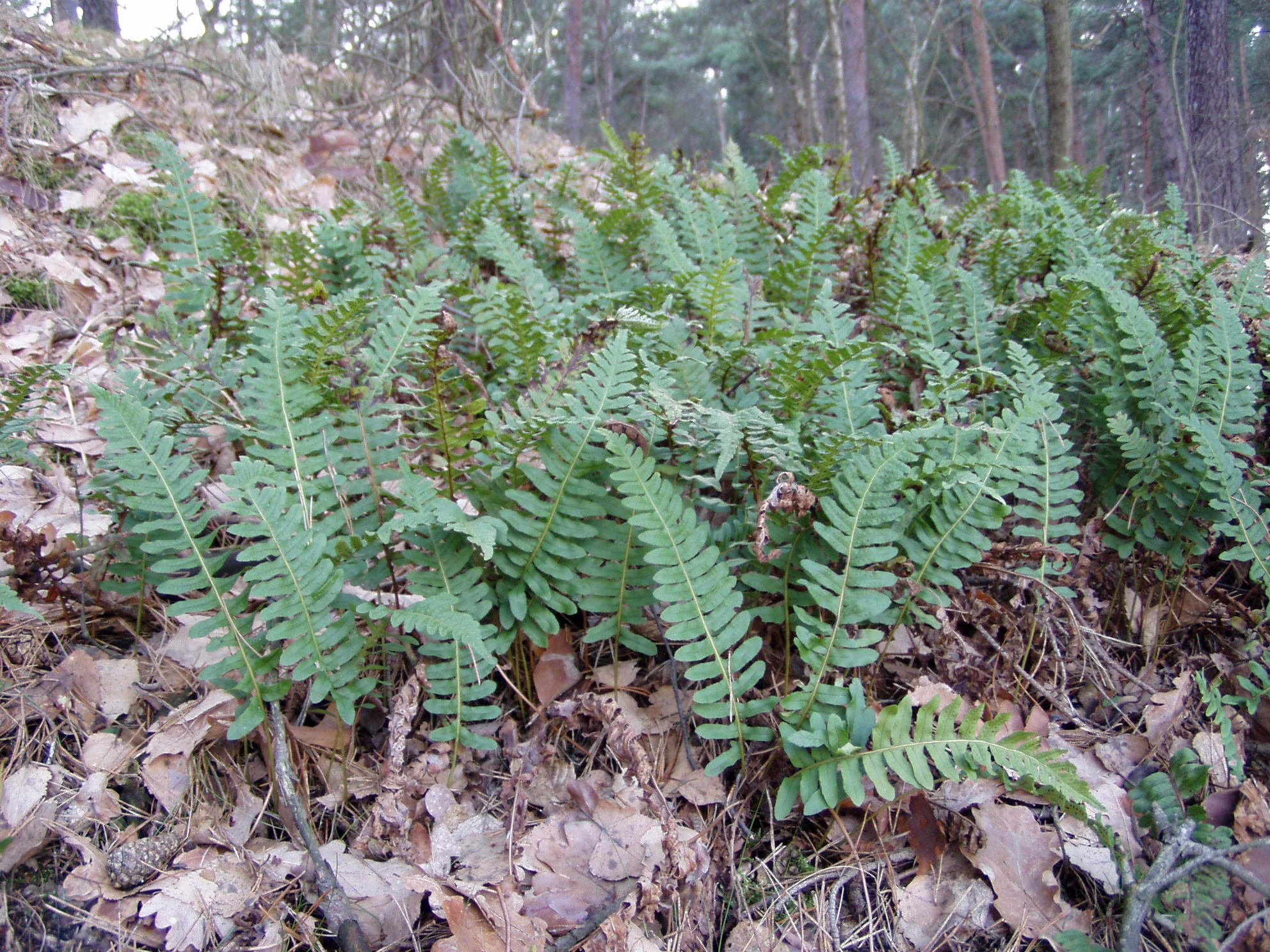
Colony

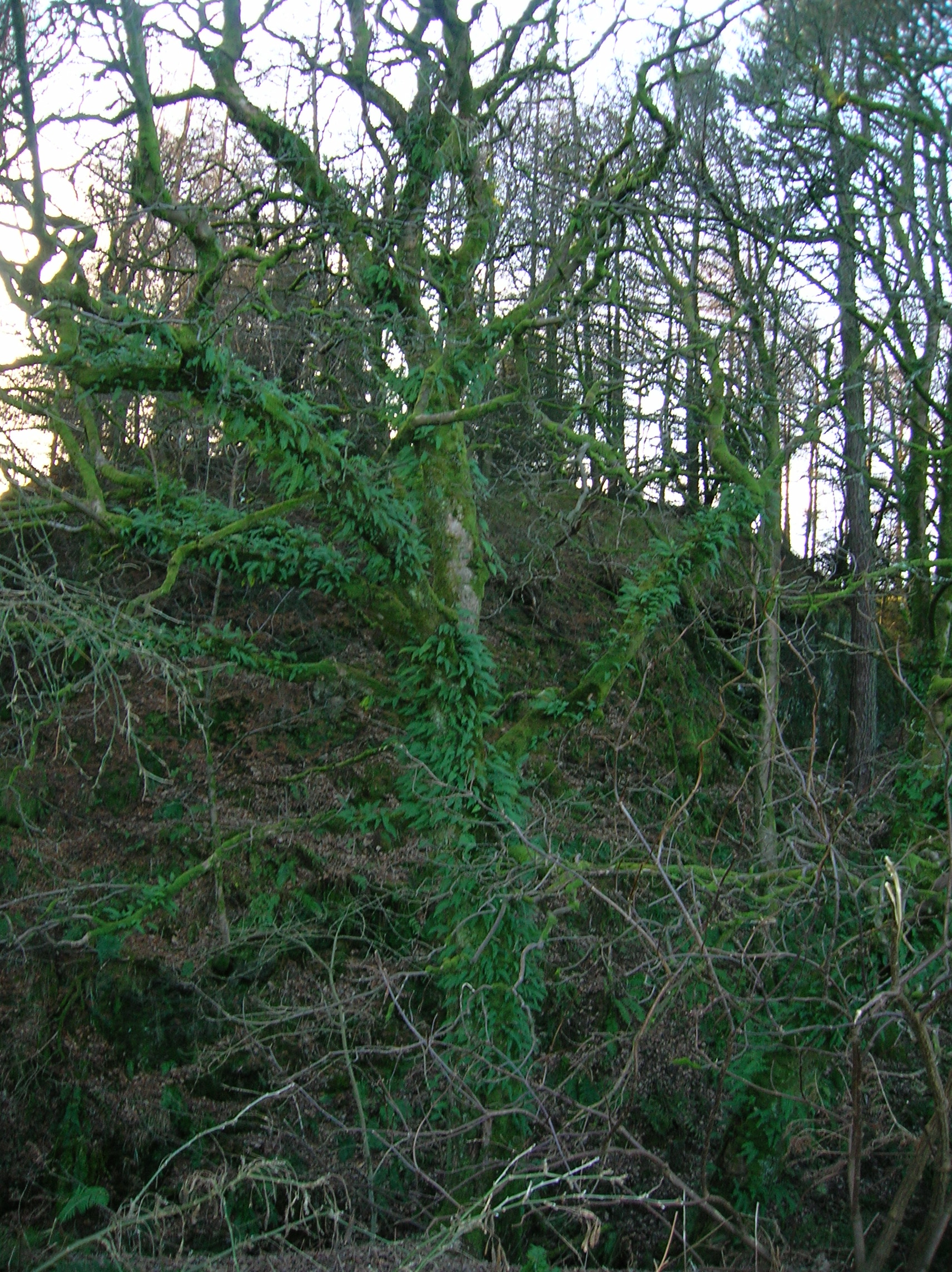
Sycamore covered entirely with the fern

Polypodium vulgare, the common polypody, is an evergreen fern of the family Polypodiaceae. The name is derived from Greek poly- ("many") and pous, podos ("foot"). Polypody has traditional uses in cooking for its aroma and sweet taste, and in herbal medicine as a purgative and vermifuge. This species is expansive and highly adapted to many environments.

== Description ==
Polypodium vulgare, also known as common polypody, is a fern developing isolated fronds along a horizontal rhizome. The fronds, with triangular leaflets, measure 10 to 50 centimetres (3.9 to 19.7 in). They grow apart from each other and are divided all the way back to the central stem in 10 to 18 pairs of segments or leaflets which measure 10–20 centimetres (3.9–7.9 in) long and 5–7 centimetres (2.0–2.8 in) wide

The leaflets become much shorter at the end of the frond. The leaflets are generally whole or slightly denticulated and somewhat wider at their base, where they often touch each other. They have an alternating arrangement, those on one side being slightly offset from those on the other side. The petioles have no scales.

The sori are found on the lower side of the fronds and range in colour from bright yellow to orange. They became dark grey at maturity

- Period of sporulation: July to September.
- Mode of dissemination: anemochory (wind dispersal)

== Distribution and habitat ==
The common polypody occurs throughout western Europe and North Africa. In Britain and Ireland, it is widespread in all areas except the drier parts of eastern England, and is most abundant in the high humidity of the uplands in the west and north; it occurs from sea level up to 760 m altitude. It is very common in France, where it is found up to an altitude of 2,000 metres (6,600 ft). It is also quite common in Scandinavia and Carpathian Mountains. It is an introduced species in New Zealand that has begun to spread into the wild as an invasive species.

=== Habitat ===
Polypodium vulgare is a hardy and highly adaptable species which commonly lives in the northern temperate zone. This fern is found in shaded and semi-shaded locations. It is a lithophyte (grows on rocks), and is found growing in the moss on old walls, cliffs, cracks in rocks, and in rocky undergrowth; also as an epiphyte on mossy trees. Its evergreen leaves allow for the absorption of sunlight during seasons when light is scarce; this is an evolutionary advantage in deciduous forests.

This species can grow as an epiphyte regardless of the height or branching of the tree it occupies. Polypodium vulgare benefits the most from this relationship if it can grow in the crotch of a tree with forking branches, leading to greater water, sunlight, and mineral collection. This species can equally achieve maturity as an epiphyte or on the ground.

== Origins ==
Polypodium vulgare is an allotetraploid species, believed to have arisen by chromosome doubling of a sterile diploid hybrid between two ferns which are not known in Europe. The fern's proposed parents are the northern Asian and northern North American Polypodium sibiricum and western North American Polypodium glycyrrhiza. Biochemical data point to a species from eastern Asia as the second possible parent. The genetics of this hybridisation caused Polypodium vulgare only to form sporangia in the sori of the allotetraploid. This trait is dominant in the species Polypodium glycyrrhiza.

The specific traits likely appeared during the ice age. This restriction of habitat and the unique hybridisation led to its formation. As the ice melted, Polypodium vulgare was left to inhabit areas that once contained glaciers.

== Identification ==
Polypodium vulgare is a complex and unique species, making its taxonomic classification and identification challenging. Subtle variations between different species of Polypodium muddle the process even further. Polypodium vulgare inhabits Northern Europe and parts of Asia. There are only four clades included in this species that still exist. There was likely a significant divergence within the species Polypodium vulgare due to geographic isolation. Recognition of its leathery-textured fronds, circular sori, and "lateral veins forked three to four times" are vital to identifying this species. Out of the genus Polypodium, Polypodium vulgare has the most northern range. The combination of these common traits allow for the identification of this species.

== Uses ==
In cooking, the rhizome has a bittersweet taste. It has traditionally been used in some confectionery, such as nougat, for its aromatic properties. In 1971, a saponin, osladin was found in the roots and believed to be the compound responsible for the sweet taste as it elicits a relative sweetness 500 times sweeter than sugar (by weight).

The dried rhizome is used in herbal medicine as a purgative and vermifuge; these properties are due to the phytoecdysteroids in the rhizome. Its use as an herbal remedy has led this species to be recognised by the European Medicines Agency. The fronds contain compounds that aid in the healing of wounds and help to fight age-related diseases. These compounds include phenolic acids and flavonoids, which speed up the regeneration of cells.

=== Research ===
P. vulgare plays the primary role in understanding of plant stomata responses to humidity. The Otto Lange group at the University of Würzburg first showed that stomatal opening and closing was performed in response to environmental humidity with Lange et al. 1971, and continued to use it to further illuminate stomatal-humidity responses in stomata-humidity-temperature dynamics in Lösch 1977 & 1979, and metabolic energy supply to fuel stomatal articulation in Lösch & Tenhunen 1981.

== Note ==
- The name Polypodium vulgare is sometimes applied to the Polypodium virginianum (rock polypody).
