= Adiantum × mairisii =

Scientific classification
- Kingdom: Plantae
- Clade: Tracheophytes
- Division: Polypodiophyta
- Class: Polypodiopsida
- Order: Polypodiales
- Family: Pteridaceae
- Genus: Adiantum
- Species: A. × mairisii

Binomial name
- Adiantum × mairisii T.Moore

Synonyms
- Adiantum capillus-veneris 'Mairisii'

Species of fern

Adiantum × mairisii (/adiˌantəm bʌɪ mɛːɪsɪˌʌɪ/) (also known as Mairis maidenhair fern) is a species of fern in the family Pteridaceae.

== Taxonomy ==
This species is a sterile hybrid between the southern maidenhair (Adiantum capillus-veneris) and another unknown species. The species is hypothesised to be:

- Adiantum raddianum
- Adiantum aethiopicum
- Adiantum cuneatum

This species is more frost-resistant than either of its parents.

== Discovery ==
Thomas Moore, who collected ferns during the Victorian period named the hybrid in the second half of the 19th century. It was described in his book, titled: "Nature-Printed British Ferns".

== Cultivation ==
This species has gained the Royal Horticultural Society's Award of Garden Merit.

The reason why this fern species is popular is due to its winter-hardiness relative to other species in the genus. The UK hardiness rating is H5, while the USDA zone range is 8-10.

=== Soil ===
This plant thrives in organic soils under partial shade, although it can also grow in sand or clay. The soil should be light, moist, rich and well-drained.

=== Foliage ===
In mild climates, this hybrid is evergreen. But in colder climates, it may defoliate throughout the winter. In spring, new fronds may form, where it is recommended to be pruned.

=== Plants and diseases ===
This species is generally not susceptible to pests and diseases.
