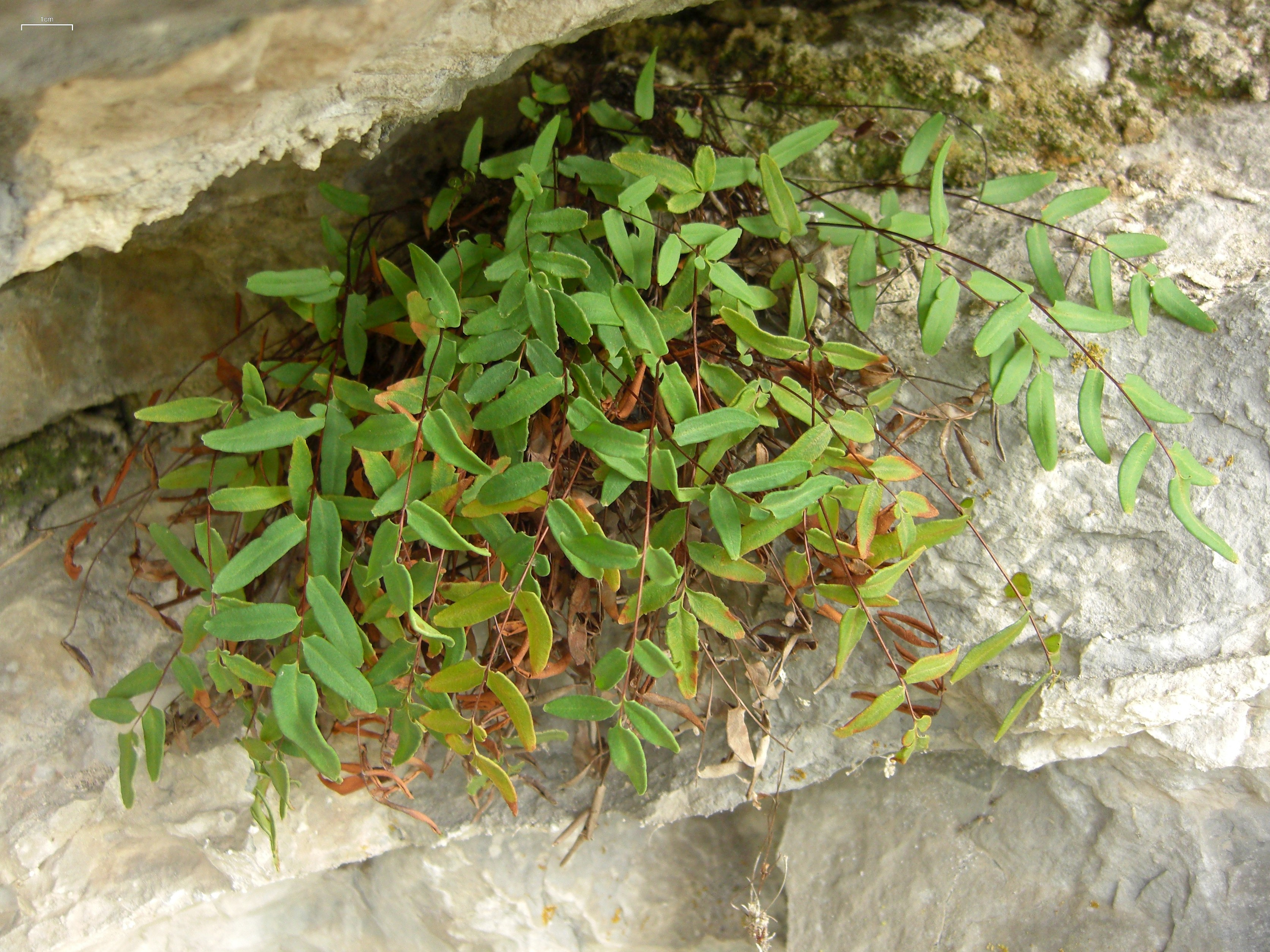

Conservation status
- Secure (NatureServe)

Scientific classification
- Kingdom: Plantae
- Clade: Tracheophytes
- Division: Polypodiophyta
- Class: Polypodiopsida
- Order: Polypodiales
- Family: Pteridaceae
- Genus: Pellaea
- Species: P. glabella

Binomial name
- Pellaea glabella Mett. ex Kuhn

Synonyms
- Pellaea atropurpurea (L.) Link var. glabella (Mett. ex Kuhn) F.C.Gates; Pellaea atropurpurea (L.) Link var. bushii Mack.

= Pellaea glabella =

Smooth cliffbrake

Species of fern

Pellaea glabella is a fern with the common name smooth cliffbrake. It was once regarded as a reduced form or variety of Pellaea atropurpurea. P. glabella is known to exist in two cryptic species, one diploid and one tetraploid. The diploid reproduces sexually, while the tetraploid is normally apogamous. It is now known that the tetraploid form of the species is one of the parents of the original hybrid P. × atropurpurea that became the apogamous species.

== Range and Habitat ==
P. glabella ranges widely in the United States and much of Canada, excluding the northernmost regions and Alaska. P. glabella is epipetric, normally growing on well-weathered limestone, usually in cracks with little or no soil. It can also be found on sandstone and basalt, probably in places where calcium is locally concentrated. It favors more exposed sites than P. atropurpurea.

== Description ==
This species has sessile or nearly sessile pinnae. Sori are formed on the underside of the pinnae edges and are covered by a false indusium formed by curled under pinna edges. It can be distinguished from Pellaea atropurpurea by its smooth, not hairy, stipe and rachis (the main leaf stalk and stem).

== Taxonomy ==
P. glabella has been assigned a total of four subspecies:

- Pellaea glabella subsp. glabella Mettenius ex Kuhn
- Pellaea glabella subsp. missouriensis (G. J. Gastony) Windham
- Pellaea glabella subsp. occidentalis (E. E. Nelson) Windham
- Pellaea glabella subsp. simplex (Butters) A. Löve & D. Löve

The subspecies glabella and simplex are the tetraploids, while missouriensis and occidentalis are the diploids. Glabella and missouriensis have hairlike scales near the midrib, while simplex and occidentalis are completely glabrous.
