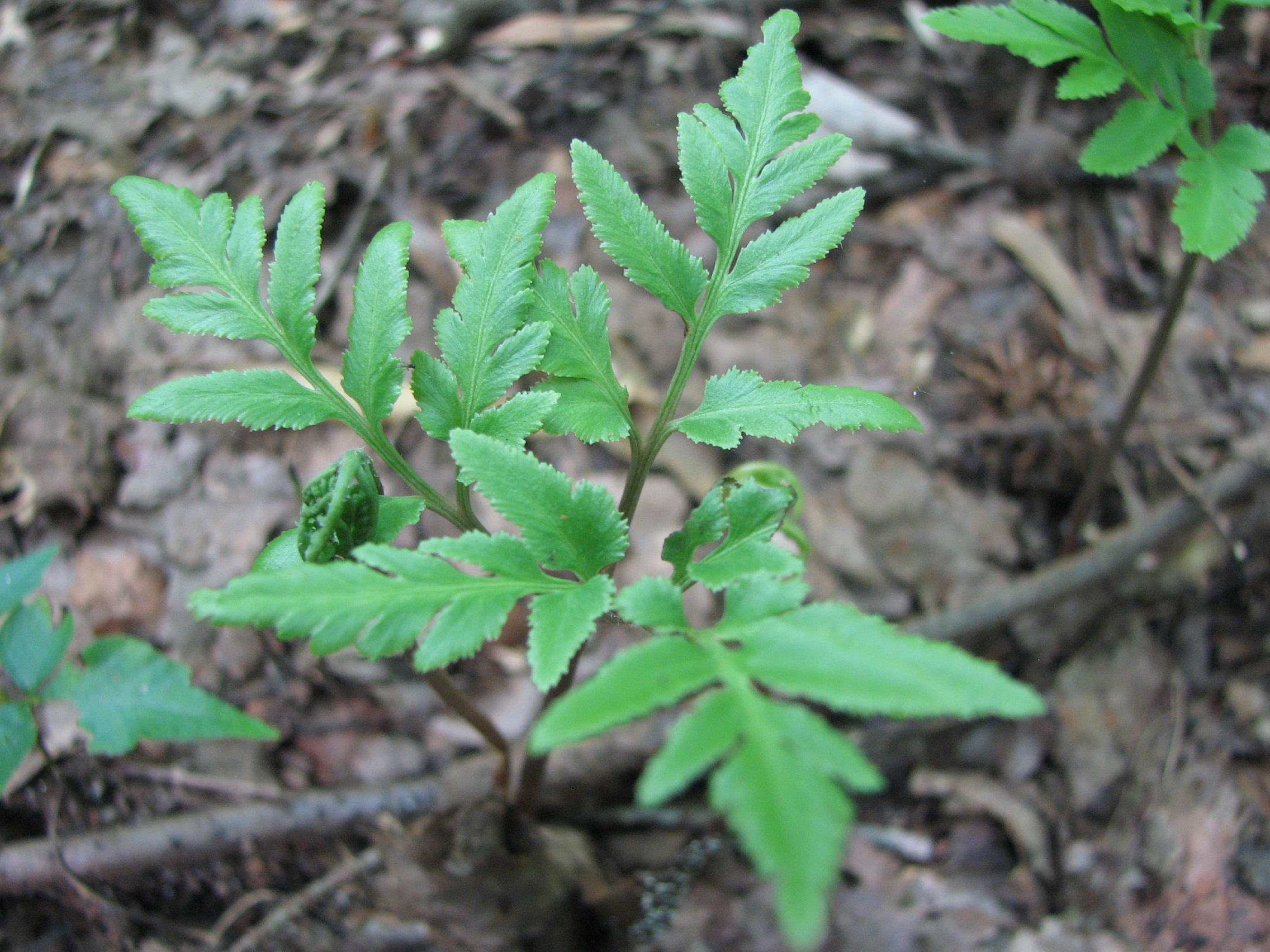

Conservation status
- Secure (NatureServe)

Scientific classification
- Kingdom: Plantae
- Clade: Tracheophytes
- Division: Polypodiophyta
- Class: Polypodiopsida
- Order: Ophioglossales
- Family: Ophioglossaceae
- Genus: Sceptridium
- Species: S. biternatum

Binomial name
- Sceptridium biternatum (Sav.) Underwood

Synonyms
- Botrychium biternatum

= Sceptridium biternatum =

Species of plant

Sceptridium biternatum, the southern grapefern or sparse-lobe grape fern, is a perennial fern in the family Ophioglossaceae, occurring in eastern North America. It occurs in "low woods, in hardwood and pine forests, in fields, and on roadsides." Like other grape ferns, it depends on a mycorrhizal association in the soil to survive.

In the fall its leaves and stem turn a reddish-brown / bronze color; a local name for it is “red fern”.
