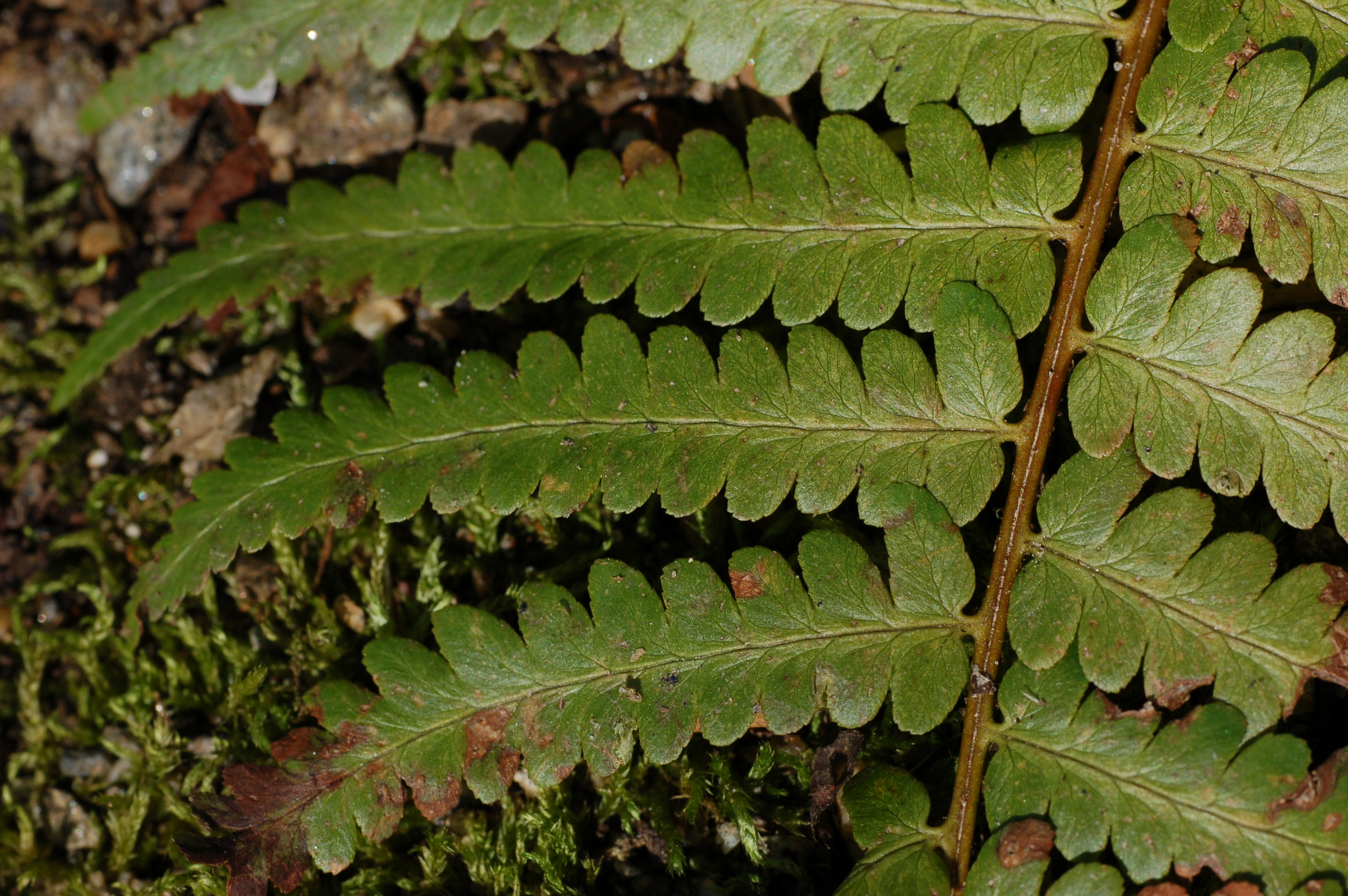

Conservation status
- Apparently Secure (NatureServe)

Scientific classification
- Kingdom: Plantae
- Clade: Tracheophytes
- Division: Polypodiophyta
- Class: Polypodiopsida
- Order: Polypodiales
- Suborder: Polypodiineae
- Family: Dryopteridaceae
- Genus: Dryopteris
- Species: D. ludoviciana

Binomial name
- Dryopteris ludoviciana (Kunze) Small

= Dryopteris ludoviciana =

Species of fern

Dryopteris ludoviciana, the southern woodfern, is fern native to southern United States from Florida west to Texas and as far north as Kentucky and North Carolina.

It is an evergreen in mild climates. Its growth habit is tall and upright with shiny and leathery dark green fronds. It will tolerate dry conditions but will perform best in moist areas. The growth rate is slow to moderate and reaches a mature height at 30–48 inches. D. ludoviciana is hardy in USDA plant hardiness zones 5–10.
