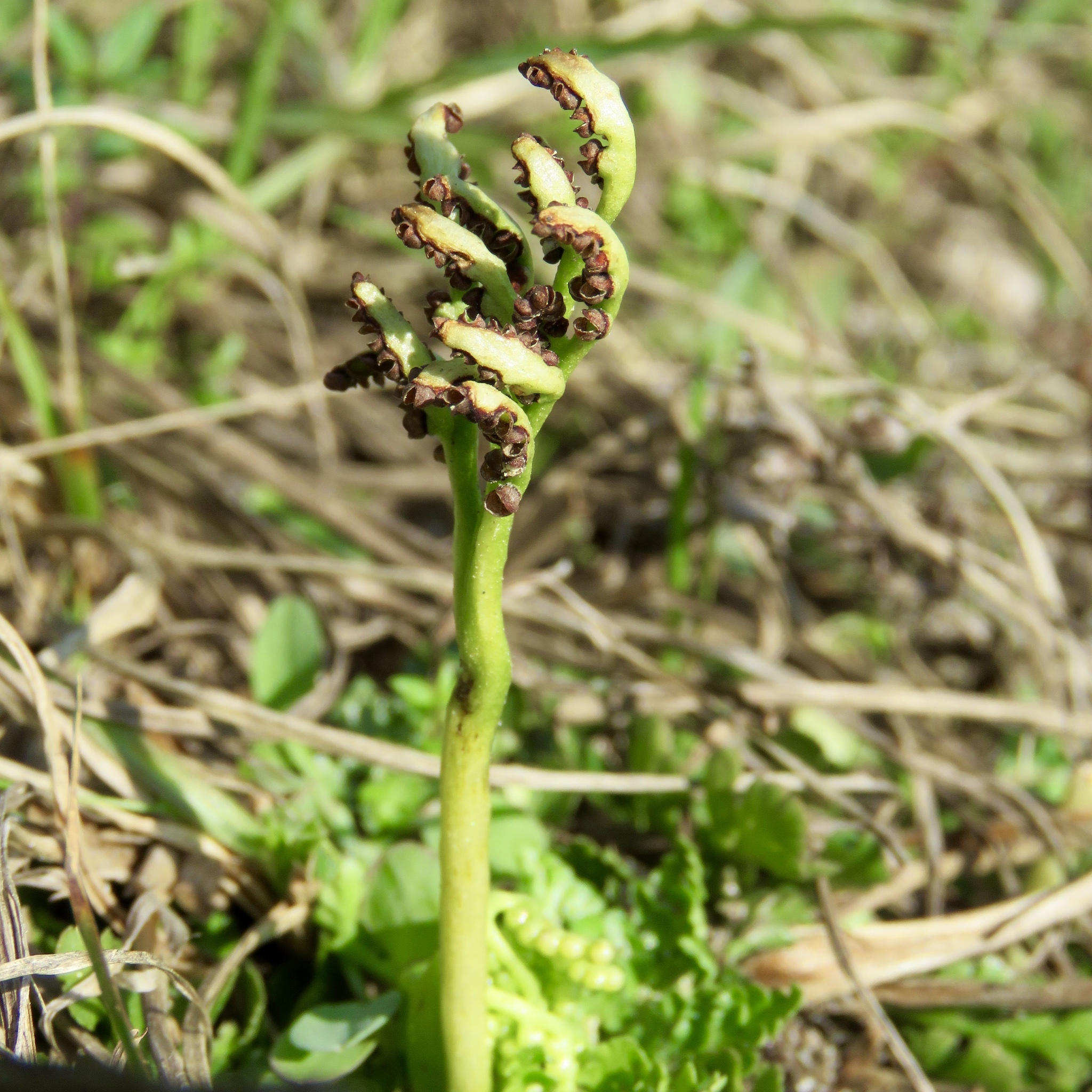

Conservation status
- Apparently Secure (NatureServe)

Scientific classification
- Kingdom: Plantae
- Clade: Tracheophytes
- Division: Polypodiophyta
- Class: Polypodiopsida
- Order: Ophioglossales
- Family: Ophioglossaceae
- Genus: Sceptridium
- Species: S. lunarioides

Binomial name
- Sceptridium lunarioides (Michx.) Holub

Synonyms
- Botrychium lunarioides (Michx.) Sw.

= Sceptridium lunarioides =

Species of plant

Sceptridium lunarioides, the winter grapefern, is a species of fern in the Ophioglossaceae family native to the southeastern United States. It is found in Texas, Oklahoma, Louisiana, Arkansas, Mississippi, Alabama, Georgia, Florida, and South Carolina. It is possibly extirpated from North Carolina. This species favors "open grassy places in prairies, cemeteries, and weedy roadsides." Like other grape ferns, it depends on a mycorrhizal association in the soil to survive.
