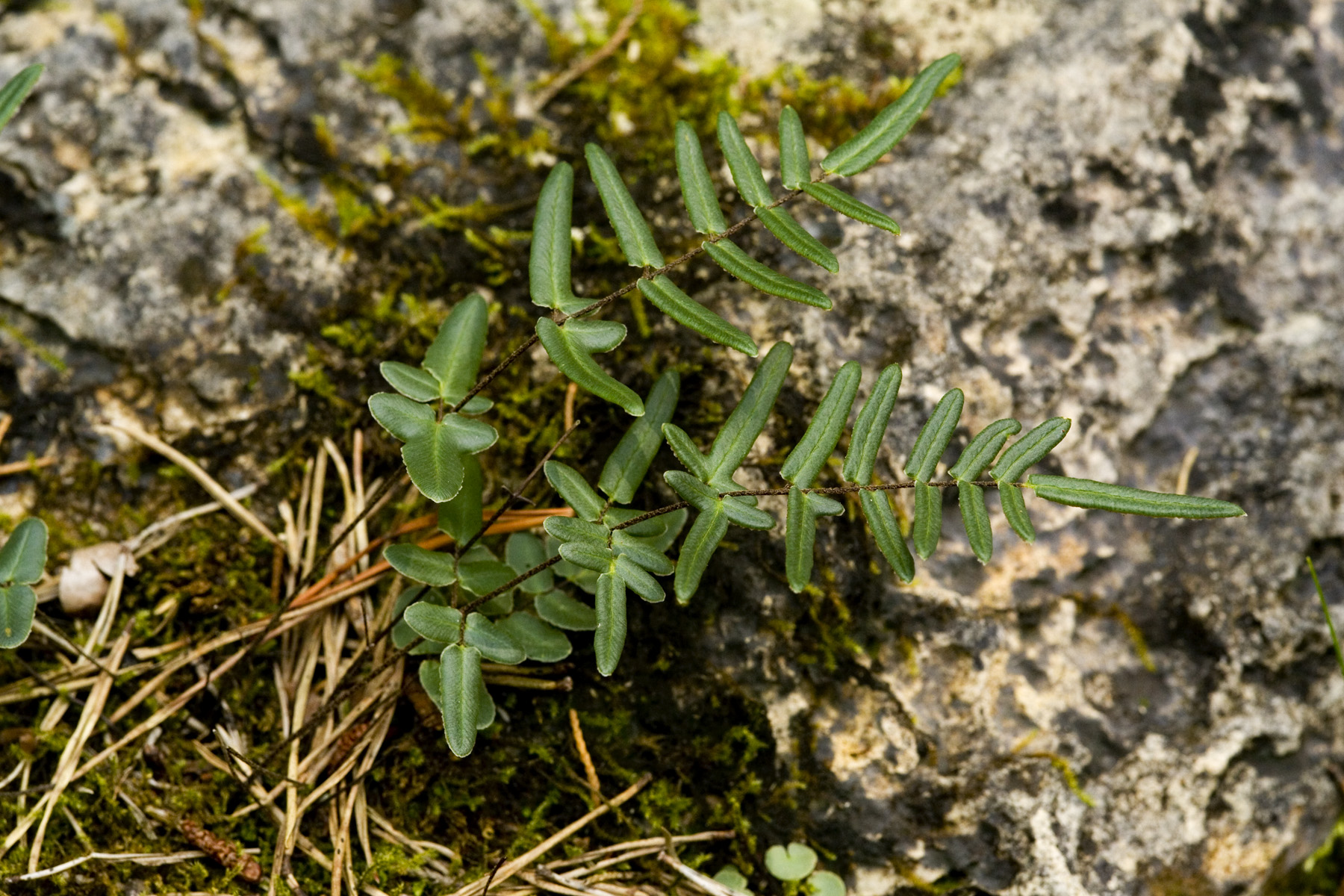

Conservation status
- Secure (NatureServe)

Scientific classification
- Kingdom: Plantae
- Clade: Embryophytes
- Clade: Tracheophytes
- Division: Polypodiophyta
- Class: Polypodiopsida
- Order: Polypodiales
- Family: Pteridaceae
- Genus: Pellaea
- Species: P. atropurpurea

Binomial name
- Pellaea atropurpurea (L.) Link

= Pellaea atropurpurea =

Species of fern

Pellaea atropurpurea, commonly known as purple-stem cliffbrake or just purple cliffbrake, is a fern native to North and Central America. Brake is an old word for fern, related to the word bracken. Like many other members of the Pteridaceae, it is a rock plant, needing a calcareous substrate.

P. atropurpurea is an apogamous autotriploid, with 3n=87 (actual base number, n=29), and is one of the historical parents of the hybrid species complex, Pellaea glabella. Apogamy, or the ability to reproduce non-sexually, is common among rock ferns in the Pteridaceae.

== Description ==
This fern produces clumps of widely arching fronds. The stipe and rachis of the blade are purple, while the blade itself has a blue-gray tinge to it. The upper pinnae are long, narrow, and undivided, while the lower ones are divided into 3–15 pinnules. The pinnae are, for the most part, opposite. Fertile fronds are longer and more heavily divided. They produce sori, which lack a true indusium, within the inrolled margins of the pinnae.

This plant may be distinguished from the similar Pellaea glabella by its larger form and by the presence of hairs on the leaf axis (the main leaf stem) and on the underside of the leaflet midribs, which are absent in Pellaea glabella (as reflected in its common name smooth cliffbrake).

== Ecology ==
Pellaea atropurpurea grows in the crevices of dry limestone cliffs, rocky slopes, crevices in alvars, and mortared walls. It is endangered in Florida, Iowa, and Rhode Island. It has become extinct in Louisiana since the limestone caprock of a salt dome at Winfield, the only location for the fern in the state, was quarried away.

== Other sources ==
- Boughton, C. (2005). Ferns of Northeastern and Central North America. New York: Houghton Mifflin.
- NRCS. "Pellaea atropurpurea". PLANTS Database. United States Department of Agriculture (USDA).
- Windham, Michael D. (1993). "Pellaea atropurpurea". In Flora of North America Editorial Committee (ed.). Flora of North America North of Mexico (FNA). Vol. 2. New York and Oxford: Oxford University Press – via eFloras.org, Missouri Botanical Garden, St. Louis, MO & Harvard University Herbaria, Cambridge, MA.
