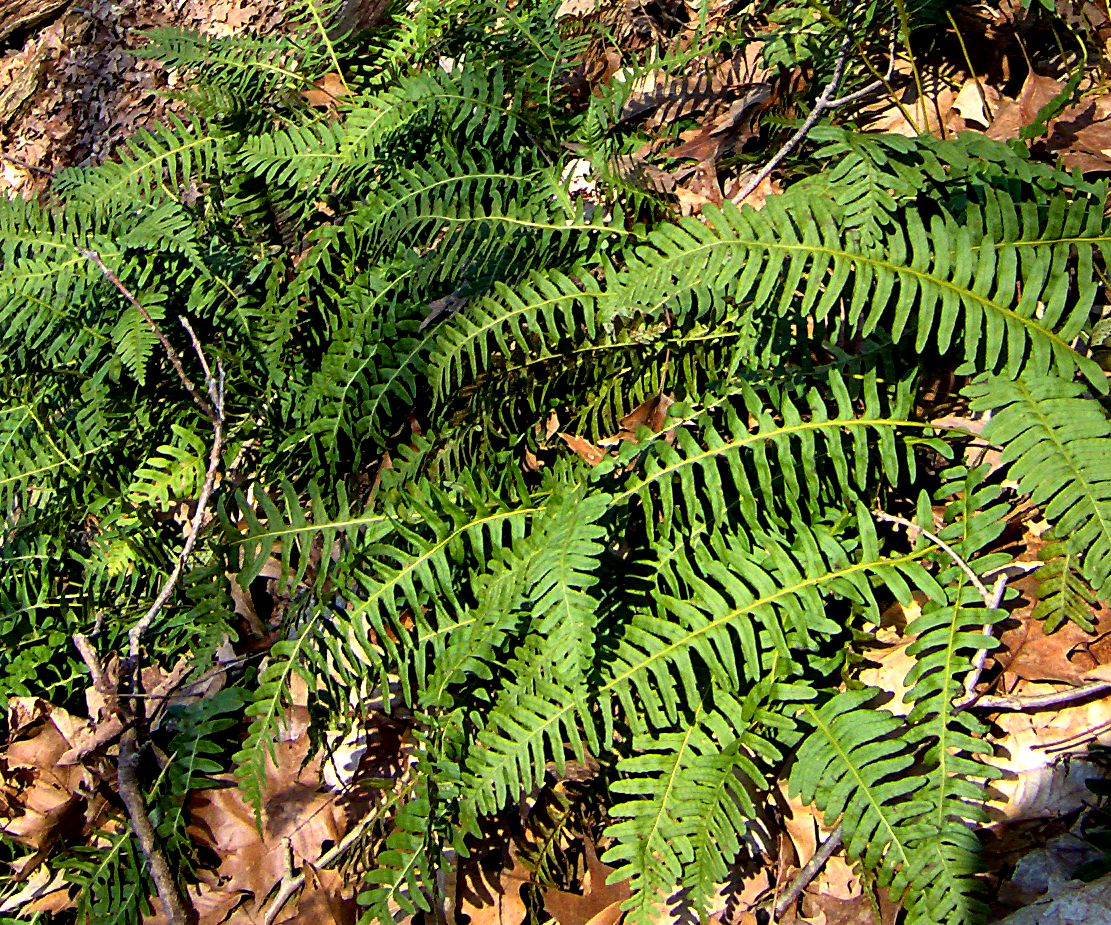

Conservation status
- Secure (NatureServe)

Scientific classification
- Kingdom: Plantae
- Clade: Embryophytes
- Clade: Tracheophytes
- Division: Polypodiophyta
- Class: Polypodiopsida
- Order: Polypodiales
- Suborder: Polypodiineae
- Family: Polypodiaceae
- Genus: Polypodium
- Species: P. virginianum

Binomial name
- Polypodium virginianum L.

Synonyms
- P. vinlandicum A. Love & D. Love, P. vulgare L. var. americanum Hooker; P. vulgare L. var. virginianum (L.) D. C. Eaton

= Polypodium virginianum =

Rock polypody

Species of plant

Polypodium virginianum, commonly known as rock polypody, rock cap fern, or common polypody, is a small evergreen species of fern native to the Eastern United States and Canada. It generally grows on rocks and occasionally on tree roots in nature.

== Description ==
Polypodium virginianum is a small rhizomatous fern with narrow leaves 8–40 centimetres (3.1–15.7 in) long and 3–6 centimetres (1.2–2.4 in) wide borne on smooth, scaleless petioles 3–15 centimetres (1.2–5.9 in). Leaves are evergreen, oblong and pinnatifid with acuminate tips.

Large, circular sori are prominently featured on the underside of fertile fronds in late summer and autumn. Sporangia are intermixed with long brown glandular hairs.

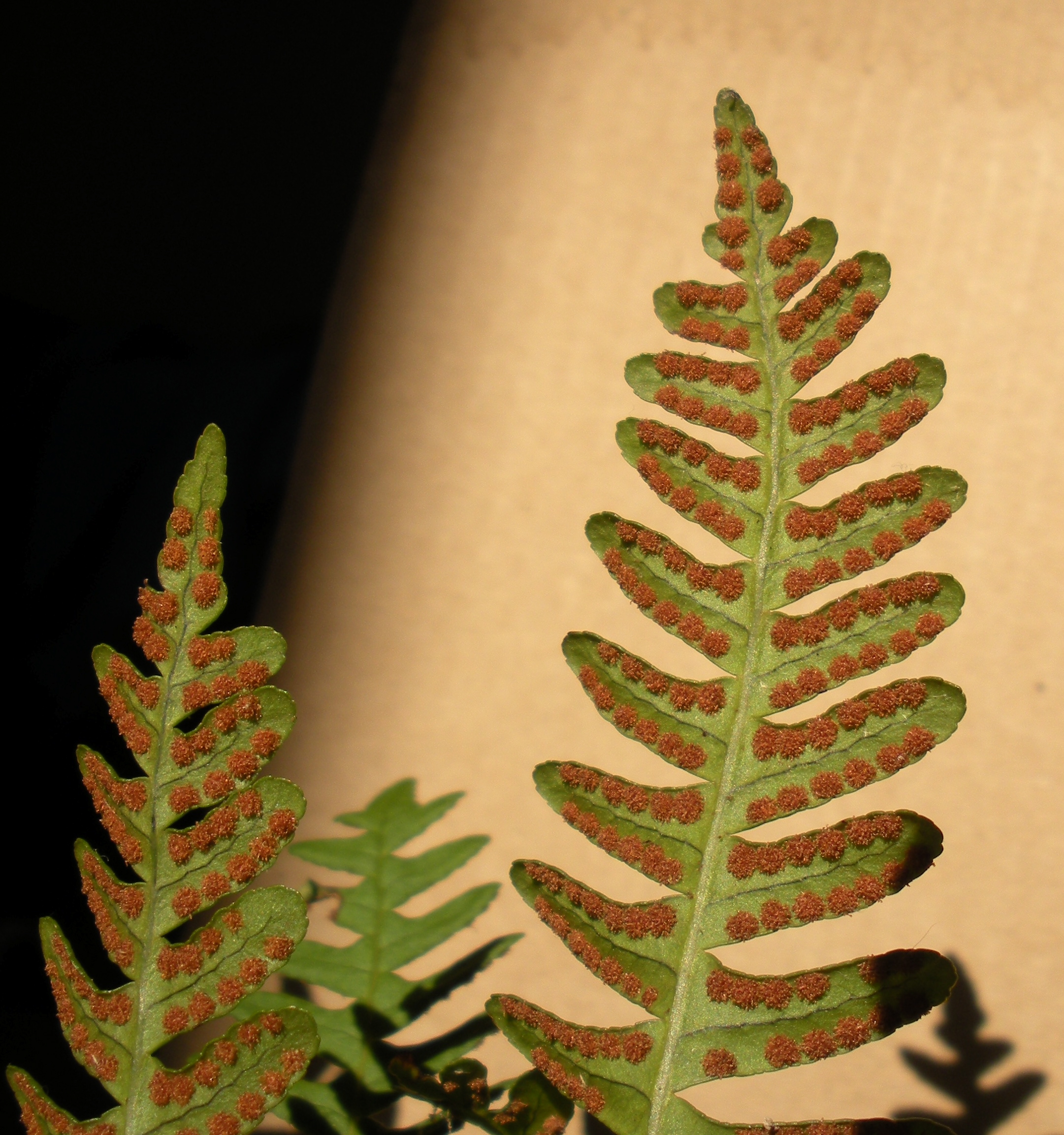

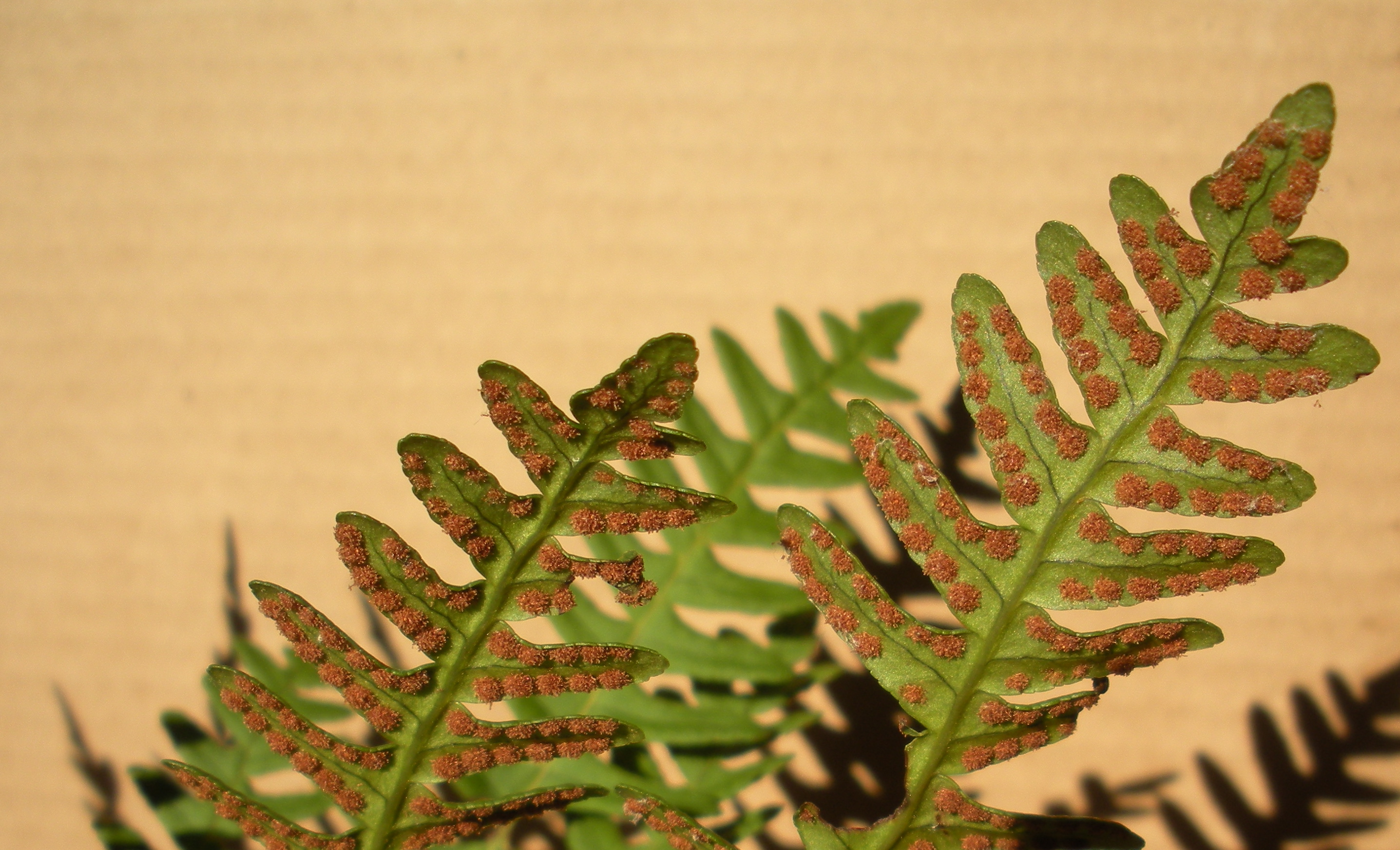
Close up

Numerous sori on the underside of a leaf

== Taxonomy ==
Polypodium virginianum has several synonyms including: P. vinlandicum A. Love & D. Love, P. vulgare L. var. americanum Hooker, P. vulgare L. var. virginianum (L.) D. C. Eaton. It is generally treated as distinct, though some have recommended it is equally well treated as a North American variety of the circumboreal Polypodium vulgare.

This species is an allotetraploid of hybrid origin, the parents being Polypodium appalachianum and P. sibiricum.

== Distribution and habitat ==
Polypodium virginianum typically grows on boulders, cliffs, and rocky slopes and does not need well-developed soil. It is common throughout eastern North America; its native distribution ranges from Newfoundland to Yukon south to Georgia, Alabama, and Arkansas.
