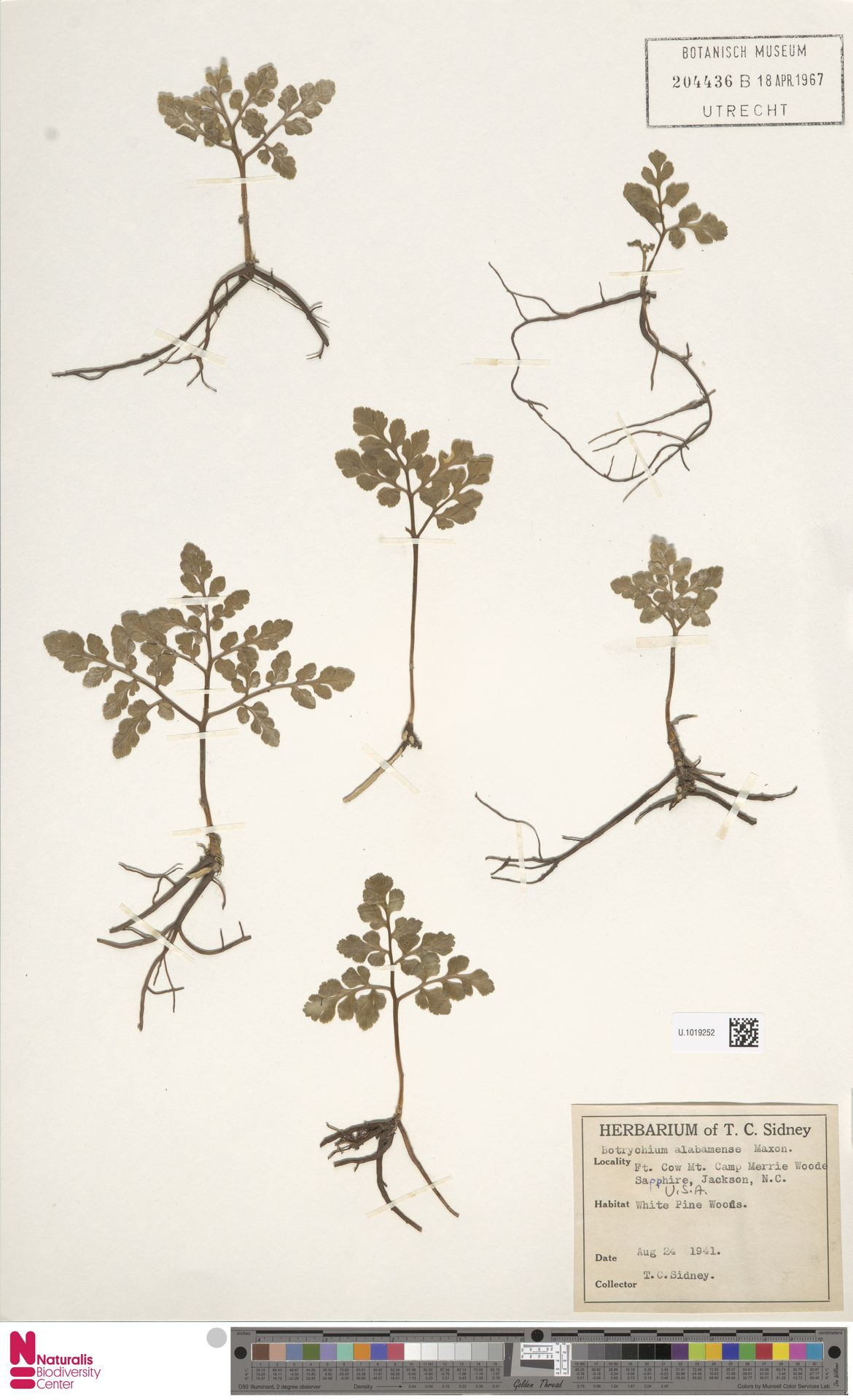

Conservation status
- Vulnerable (NatureServe)

Scientific classification
- Kingdom: Plantae
- Clade: Tracheophytes
- Division: Polypodiophyta
- Class: Polypodiopsida
- Order: Ophioglossales
- Family: Ophioglossaceae
- Genus: Sceptridium
- Species: S. jenmanii

Binomial name
- Sceptridium jenmanii Underwood

Synonyms
- Botrychium alabamense; Botrychium jenmanii

= Sceptridium jenmanii =

Species of plant

Sceptridium jenmanii, the Alabama grapefern or Dixie grapefern, is a species of fern in the Ophioglossaceae native to the southeastern United States. It is a rare species, and is apparently in decline. Like other grape ferns, it depends on a mycorrhizal association in the soil to survive.
