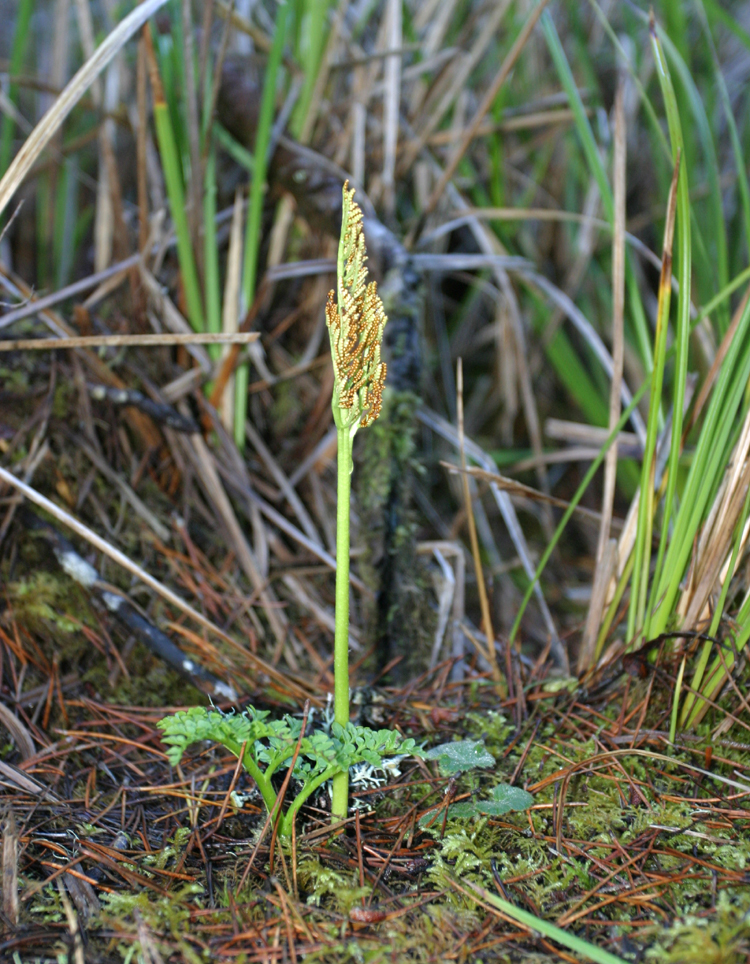

Scientific classification
- Kingdom: Plantae
- Clade: Tracheophytes
- Division: Polypodiophyta
- Class: Polypodiopsida
- Order: Ophioglossales
- Family: Ophioglossaceae
- Genus: Sceptridium
- Species: S. multifidum

Binomial name
- Sceptridium multifidum (S.G.Gmel.) Tagawa

Synonyms
- Botrychium multifidum Botrychium californicum Botrychium coulteri Botrychium matricariae Botrychium silaifolium

= Sceptridium multifidum =

Species of fern

Sceptridium multifidum is a fern species in the Ophioglossaceae (Adder's tongue family), known by the common names leathery grapefern and leathery moonwort.

== Distribution ==
It is native to Europe, Asia, and North America including Greenland, where it is widespread and grows in moist areas in many habitat types.

== Description ==
This is a fleshy, leathery plant growing from a small caudex with thin, corky roots. Unlike most ferns, S. multifidum has contractile roots, which are thought to help anchor the plant in the soil. It produces a single leaf which emerges directly from the ground. It is divided into a sterile and a fertile part. The sterile part of the leaf is wide and has rounded or oval-shaped leaflets. The fertile part of the leaf is very different in shape, with grape-like clusters of sporangia by which it reproduces. The gametophytes develop from these spores in the soil, and are thought to associate with an endophytic fungus like the gametophytes of other members of this genus. While the gametophytes have not been observed in nature, they have been grown under lab conditions.

== Rarity ==
This species is rare in Europe. In Ukraine, there have been 86 recorded localities. In Greenland this species is considered Vulnerable. In the Pacific Northwest of the USA, Botrychium multifidum grows in sphagnum bogs along the coast, in meadows, and along the margins of mountain lakes and streams. But it is uncommon.
