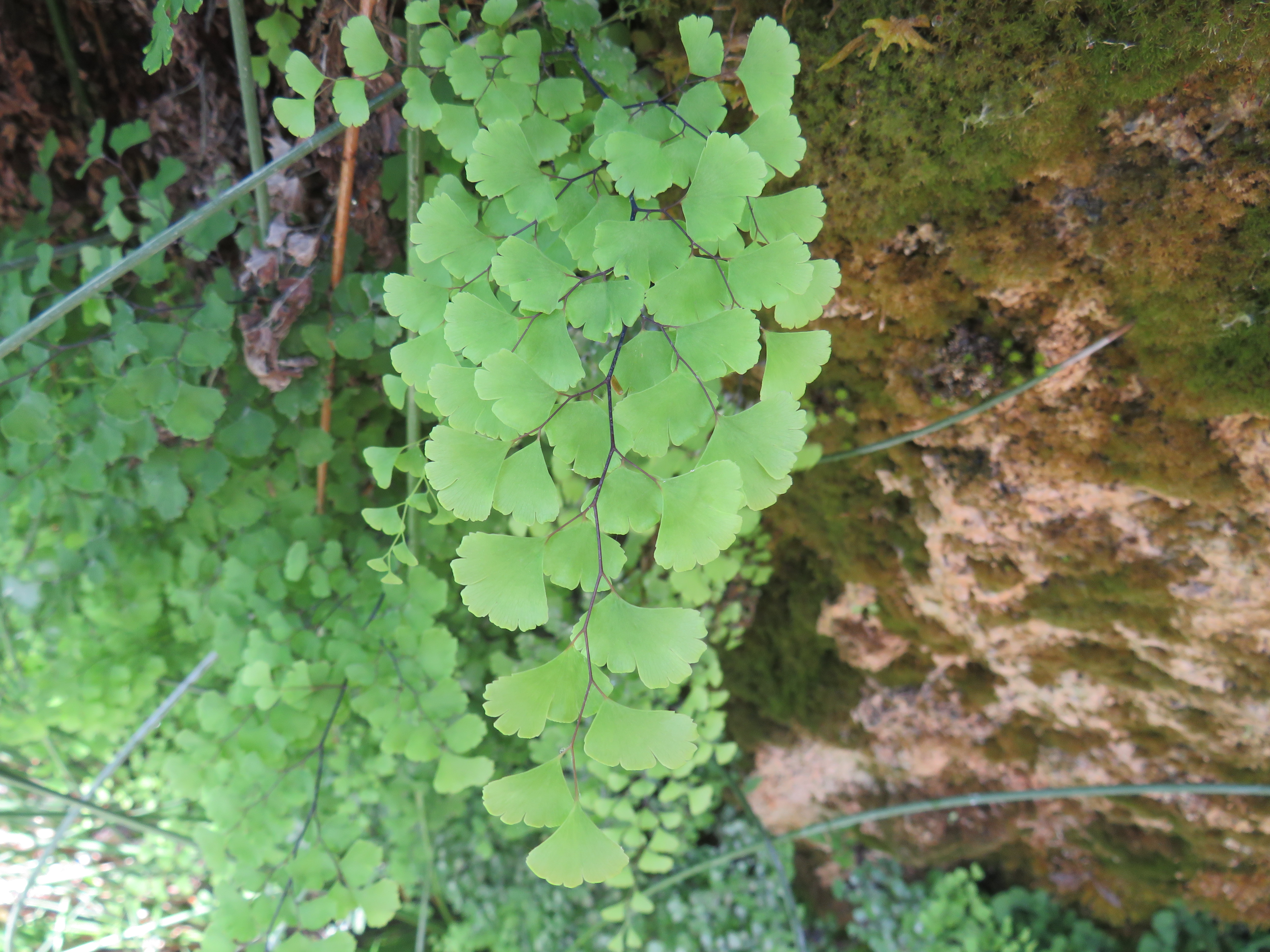

Conservation status
- Least Concern (IUCN 3.1)

- Secure (NatureServe)

Scientific classification
- Kingdom: Plantae
- Clade: Tracheophytes
- Division: Polypodiophyta
- Class: Polypodiopsida
- Order: Polypodiales
- Family: Pteridaceae
- Genus: Adiantum
- Species: A. capillus-veneris

Binomial name
- Adiantum capillus-veneris L.

= Adiantum capillus-veneris =

Species of fern

Adiantum capillus-veneris, the maidenhair fern, southern maidenhair fern, black maidenhair fern and venus hair fern, is a species of ferns in the genus Adiantum and the family Pteridaceae with a subcosmopolitan worldwide distribution. It is cultivated as a popular garden fern and houseplant.

== Distribution ==
Adiantum capillus-veneris is native to humid warm temperate to tropical regions globally. It occurs in western and southern Europe (north to southern Scotland, where its northernmost sites are found), much of Africa, the Levant and across Asia to Japan, in Australasia, and in the Americas in the southern half of the United States from California to the Atlantic coast, through Mexico and Central America, to South America. There are two disjunct occurrences in the northern part of North America, at Cascade Springs in the Black Hills of South Dakota and Fairmont Hot Springs, British Columbia. In both instances, the warm microclimate created by hot mineral springs permits the growth of the plant far north of its normal range. It is similar in Zvonce spa resort (Звоначка Бања, Zvonačka Banja), near Pirot in Serbia, where hot mineral springs provide adequate heat and humidity for the survival of this species.

It is found in temperate climates from warm-temperate to tropical, where the moisture content is high but not saturated, in the moist, well-drained sand, loam or limestone of many habitats, including rainforests, shrub and woodlands, broadleaf and coniferous forests, and desert cliff seeps, and springs. It often may be seen growing on moist, sheltered and shaded sandstone or limestone formations, generally south-facing in the southern hemisphere, north-facing in the north, or in gorges. It occurs throughout Africa in moist places by streams. On moist sandstone cliffs it grows in full or partial shade, even when unprotected.

Botanists were surprised to find it thriving in the 14th-century underground tunnels of Znojmo, South Moravia. The fern was first found in the tunnels in 2020 and has since spread significantly, thanks to the damp environment and artificial lighting from tourist tours. One theory suggests the fern's spores originated from a houseplant in Znojmo, while another proposes they traveled from a tropical country. Despite its unusual location, the fern is not expected to spread beyond the tunnels or harm local species.

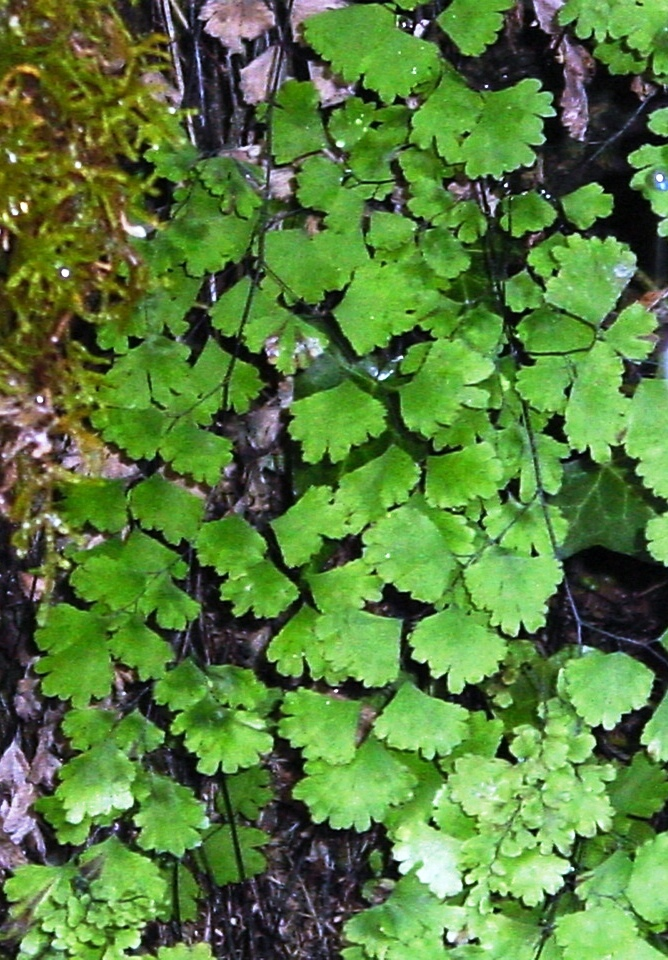
Adiantum capillus-veneris foliage texture.

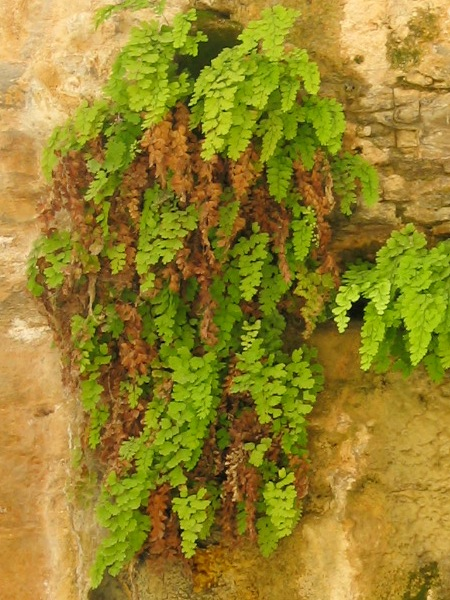
In limestone cliff seep habitat near Ein Gedi in the Judean Desert, Israel

== Description ==
Adiantum capillus-veneris grows from 15 to 30 cm (6 to 12 in) in height; its fronds arising in clusters from creeping rhizomes 20 to 70 cm (8 to 28 in) tall, with very delicate, light green fronds much subdivided into pinnae 5 to 10 mm (0.2 to 0.4 in) long and broad; the frond rachis is black and wiry.

== Cultivation ==
Adiantum capillus-veneris is cultivated and widely available around the world for planting in natural landscape native plants and traditional shade gardens, for outdoor container gardens, and commonly as an indoor houseplant.

Adiantum × mairisii is a winter hardy hybrid of Adiantum capillus-veneris with another species, which is likely to be one of Adiantum raddianum, Adiantum aethiopicum, or Adiantum cuneatum.

As a houseplant, Adiantum capillus-veneris requires filtered light and very humid conditions. It should be grown in soil rich in organic matter and should be watered frequently but lightly, to keep the roots damp but not drenched. The temperature should not fall below 12 °C (54 °F). It is propagated by dividing, making sure each clump has a section of rhizome.

== Conservation ==
The fern is listed as an endangered species in North Carolina (as southern maidenhair-fern) and threatened species in Kentucky (as venus hair fern), due to loss of Appalachian habitat.

== Traditional uses ==
This plant is used medicinally by Native Americans. The Mahuna people use the plant internally for rheumatism, and the Navajo people of Kayenta, Arizona use an infusion of the plant as a lotion for bumblebee and centipede stings. The Navajo people also smoke it or take it internally to treat mental illness.

In the traditional medicine of Iran, frond infusion of Adiantum capillus-veneris is used for jaundice therapy. Along with this, they have a wide range of medicinal uses and have been used to treat coughs, cold, and to aid in kidney function.
