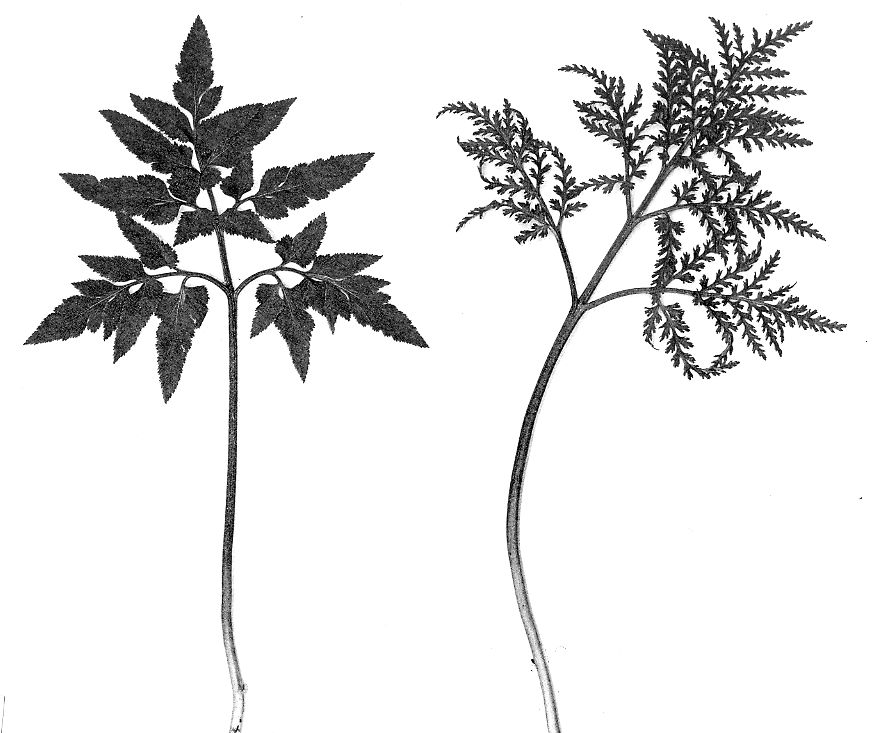

Conservation status
- Secure (NatureServe)

Scientific classification
- Kingdom: Plantae
- Clade: Embryophytes
- Clade: Tracheophytes
- Division: Polypodiophyta
- Class: Polypodiopsida
- Order: Ophioglossales
- Family: Ophioglossaceae
- Genus: Sceptridium
- Species: S. dissectum

Binomial name
- Sceptridium dissectum (Spreng.) Lyon 1905

Synonyms
- Botrychium dissectum Spreng. 1804; Botrychium obliquum Muhl. 1810

= Sceptridium dissectum =

Species of fern

Sceptridium dissectum is a common fern (or fern-ally) in the family Ophioglossaceae, occurring in eastern North America. Like other plants in this group, it normally only sends up one frond per year. It has long been the subject of confusion because the frond presents in one of two forms, either the normal form (forma obliquum) that resembles other plants in the genus, or the skeletonized form (forma dissectum).

This is the most common grape fern throughout most of its range. It is a frequent denizen of disturbed lands, often growing with Diphasiastrum digitatum and Asplenium platyneuron. It has an unusual growing season, with the new frond emerging in July and dying back in May. The frond often turns from green to a bronze color during the winter.

Like other grape ferns, it depends on a mycorrhizal association in the soil.

== Description ==
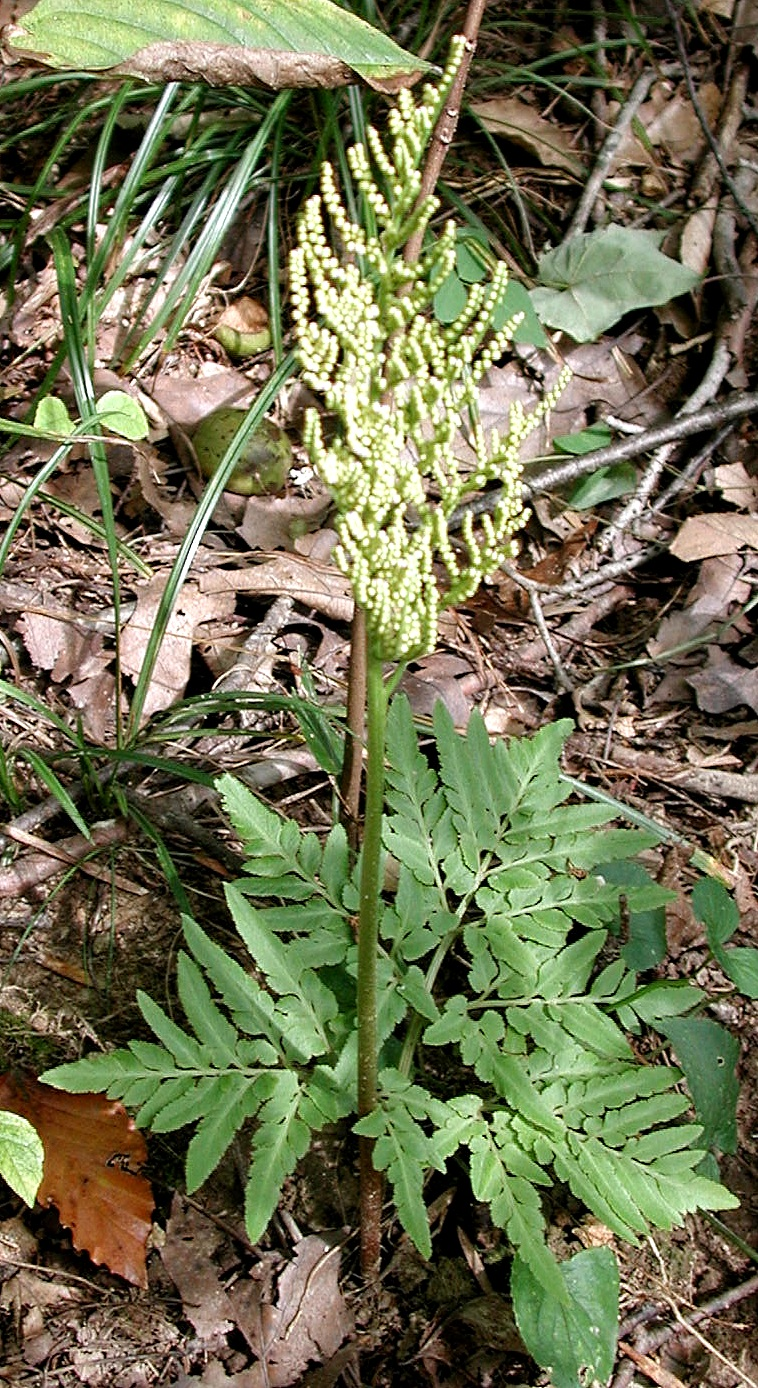
Grape fern, Sceptridium dissectum, in Harrison County, Ohio

Sceptridium dissectum (Spreng.) Lyon has two separate fronds. The fertile frond looks superficially like a stalk of grapes while the other sterile frond is leafy. Sceptridium dissectum leaves are a light green during the spring and early summer, with the leaves becoming deciduous in late summer. The leaves usually turn a bronze color in late fall through winter. The grape like sporangia range from green to yellow. The petiole or stalk of the plant is green from top to bottom and glabrous as is the sterile frond. Sceptridium dissectum is a non-flowering plant. The sterile frond or leaf is mostly bipinnate.

At first glance most think there are two separate fronds. The fertile stalk is joined to the stalk of sterile leaf blade near the rhizome. The sporangia resemble grapes which is why these types of ferns are known as grape ferns. The leaves on a sterile frond have lacy edges. Sceptridium dissectum stands six to fifteen inches tall. Sceptridium dissectum can stay a greenish bronze color through winter.

== Taxonomy ==
Sceptridium dissectum can be misidentified as Botrypus virginianus (L.) Sw. commonly known rattlesnake fern. Botrypus virginianus sporangia looks like a rattle from the tail of a rattlesnake. Sceptridium dissectum is also a close relative to the Southern Grapefern or Botrychium biternatum. These ferns are part of the Ophioglossales order and Ophioglossaceae, known as the Adder's tongue family. There are three ways to help distinguish the cut-leaf grape fern and the rattlesnake fern. The first is by size, the rattle snake fern can be found up to two feet tall compared to the cut-leaf fern that can be found up to a foot tall. Second the petiole or stalk for a cut-leaf fern is light green while the rattlesnake fern's petiole is pink at the base.

Sceptridium dissectum (Spreng.) Lyon was known as Botrychium dissectum Spreng. Sceptridium dissectum became the name of the cutleaf grapefern in 1905. Botrychium dissectum held the name from 1804 until 1905. Sceptridium dissectum also goes by a few other names such as Botrychium dissectum Spreng. var. obliquum (Muhl. ex Willd.) Clute, Botrychium dissectum Spreng. var. oblongifolium (Graves) Broun, Botrychium obliquum Muhl. ex Willd., Botrychium obliquum Muhl. ex Willd. var. elongatum Gilbert & Haberer, Osmunda obliqua (Muhl.) Poir., Botrychium ternatum var. obliquum (Muhl.) D.C. Eaton.

== Distribution and habitat ==
Sceptridium dissectum ranges from Minnesota, south to northeastern Texas and across the east coast of the US. The habitats of the cutleaf grapefern are woodlands, sandy grasslands, the edge of swamps or ravines. One of the favored habitats of these plants are woodlands of deciduous forests where the cutleaf grapefern receives winter sun.

== Cultivation ==
Sceptridium dissectum is a homosporous fern, which means it only produces one kind of spore. Sceptridium dissectum is also perennial. The cutleaf grapefern typically grows in partial sunlight to medium shade. For soil conditions, the cutleaf grapefern grows in soil containing loam or sandy loam. The cutleaf grapefern also grows in moist to dry-mesic conditions. The cutleaf grapefern takes a long time to develop from its spores; the fern is dependent on mycorrhizal fungi for survival.

The spores have to be in darkness for 3–4 weeks before any spore germination can occur. The longer the spores remain in darkness, the greater percentage of germination may occur. Spore germination and early gametophyte growth were also directly affected by the oxidation level of the supplied nitrogen source. The fern remains dependent on the fungi even after sterile and fertile leaves emerge. Unlike some members of the Ophioglossacae, Sceptridum dissectum does not always develop spores. Sceptridum dissectum only creates one leaf per year. The cutleaf grapefern is rumored to live for about 10 to 45 years. Because the cutleaf grapefern is so hard to cultivate, it is rarely used horticulturally.

== Uses ==
Wild turkey and ruffed grouse feed on the leaves, as do white-tailed deer.
