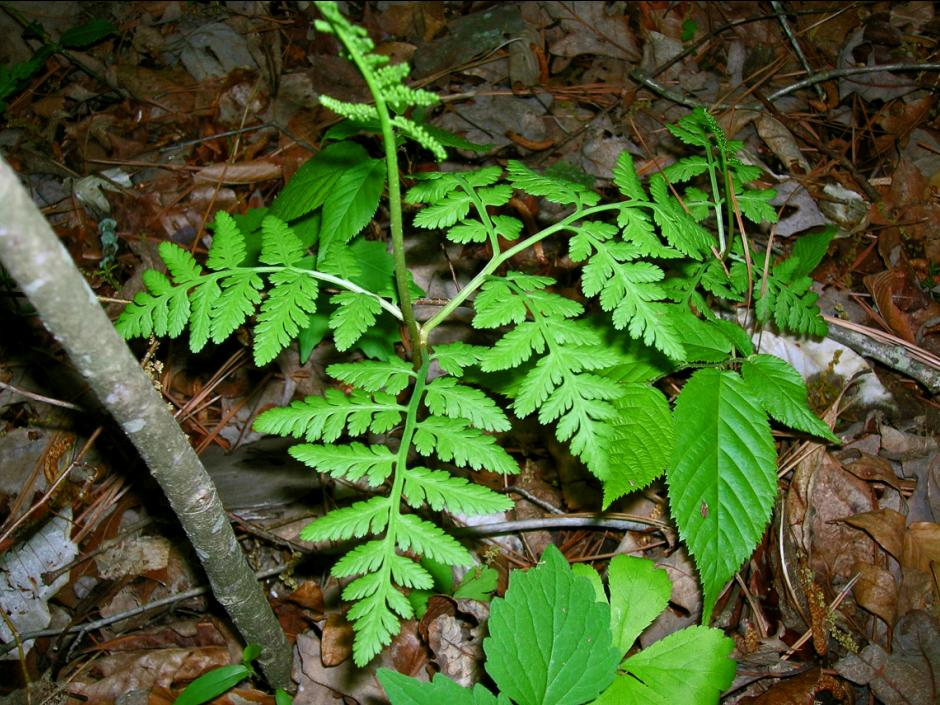

Conservation status
- Secure (NatureServe)

Scientific classification
- Kingdom: Plantae
- Clade: Tracheophytes
- Division: Polypodiophyta
- Class: Polypodiopsida
- Order: Ophioglossales
- Family: Ophioglossaceae
- Subfamily: Botrychioideae
- Genus: Botrypus; Michx.
- Species: B. virginianus

Binomial name
- Botrypus virginianus (L.) Michx.

Synonyms
- Genus: Botrychium section Osmundopteris Milde; Botrychium (Osmundopteris) (Milde) Clausen; Osmundopteris (Milde) Small; Botrychium section Virginianae Clausen; Species: Osmunda virginiana L.; Botrychium virginianum (L.) Sw.; Japanobotrychium virginianum (L.) M.Nishida; Osmundopteris virginiana (L.) Small

= Botrypus =

North American species of fern

Botrypus virginianus, synonym Botrychium virginianum, sometimes called rattlesnake fern is a species of perennial fern in the adders-tongue family. It is monotypic within the genus Botrypus, meaning that it is the only species within the genus. It is called the rattlesnake fern in some parts of North America, due to its habit of growing in places where rattlesnakes are also found. Rattlesnake fern prefers to grow in rich, moist woods in dense shade and will not tolerate direct sunlight.

== Description ==
It is a low growing species, typically being a foot high or smaller. The leaf emerges in the early spring and will senesce in late summer. The leaf is roughly triangularly shaped and 15–50 cm in size and held roughly parallel to the ground. The leaf is 3-4 times pinnately compound, brightly green colored, and feels soft to the touch. The stem is round and bicolor, being pinkish or light tan at the base but greenish nearer the branches or leaves. The diploid number is 184.

Rattlesnake fern has separate fertile and sterile leaves, when present the sterile leaf arises halfway up the stalk and the fertile leaf exists at the tip. The spores are shed in late spring. Like other ferns rattlesnake fern undergoes alternation of generations and the form described in this article is the sporophyte.

This fern has been used medicinally. In India it is still used to treat dysentery.

== Taxonomy and genetics ==
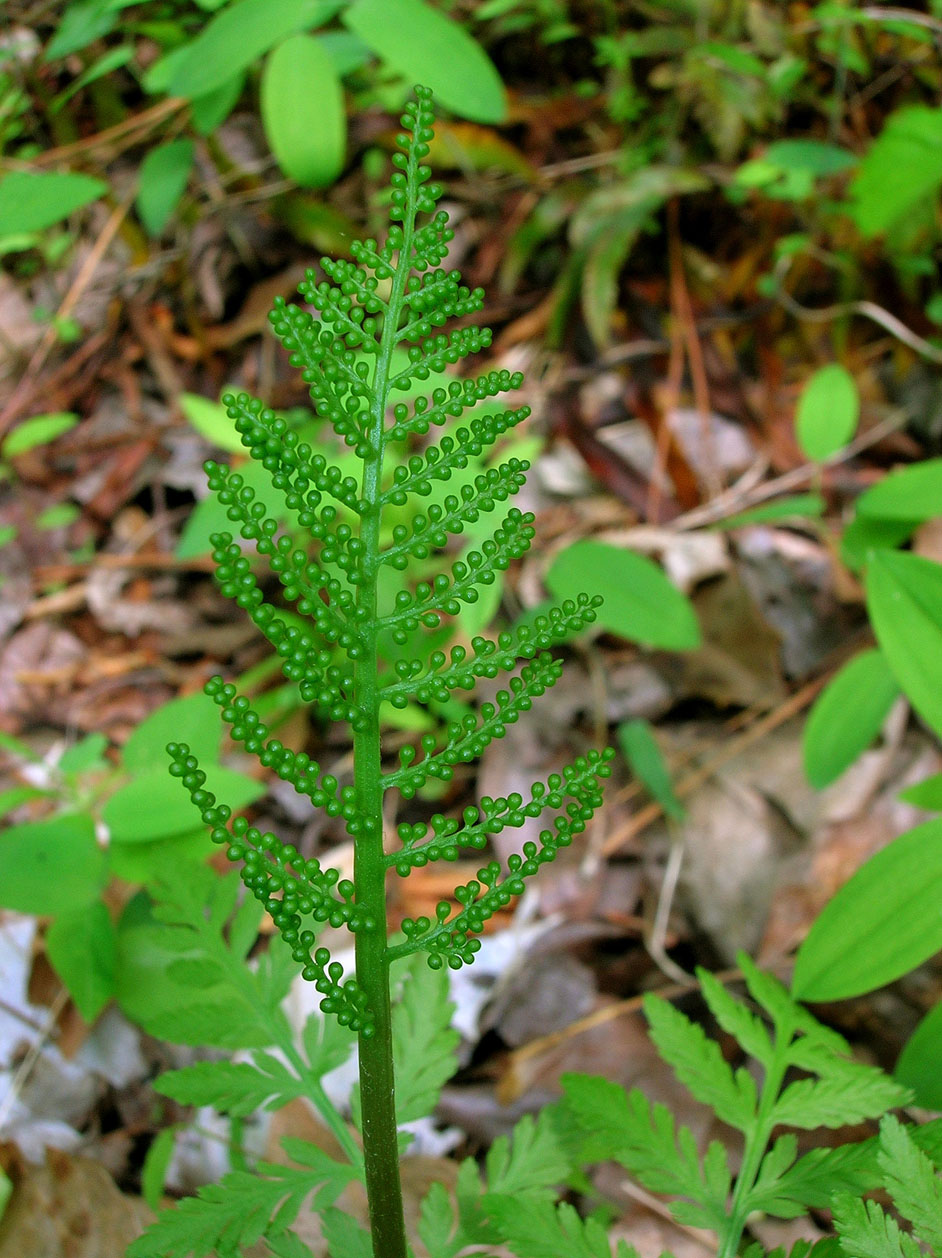
Spore-producing frond of Botrypus virginianus

The first formal species description of Botrypus virginianus was made by Carl Linnaeus in 1753 as Osmunda virginiana.

Recent research has determined that the mitochondria are genetic chimera. DNA from some member of the Santalales, possibly a species of mistletoe, has transferred to the mitochondrial genome of this species of fern. It is believed that this transfer may have helped to enable this plant's cosmopolitan global distribution.

This plant has traditionally been included in the genus Botrychium as the subgenus Osmundopteris (based on the species' superficial similarities to the genus Osmunda), but was unique within the genus because of chromosome number and other signatures, including the inclusion of presumed mistletoe DNA within its mitochondria. Recent research has established that this plant is sister to all other botrychioid plants, including both the genus Botrychium sensu stricto – rattlesnake fern, common grapefern – and the genus Sceptridium, with the exception of a single known species, previously included in Botrypus, which is B. strictus. That plant was shown to be sister to all other botrychioids, so must be segregated in its own genus.

The Smith et al. classification of 2006, based on molecular phylogeny, lumped Botrypus within Botrychium, in the Ophioglossaceae, which was continued in the Christenhusz et al. classification of 2011 and the Christenhusz and Chase classification of 2014. It is recognized as a distinct genus in Ophioglossaceae by the Pteridophyte Phylogeny Group classification of 2016 (PPG I).

== Distribution and uses ==
This is a wide-ranging species. It abounds in many parts of the United States, in the mountains of Mexico, in Australia, in some parts of Asia, as the Himalaya Mountains, and is found also in Norway, in the Karelia region of Finland and Russia, and around Gulf of Bothnia, although in no other part of Europe. It is large and succulent and is boiled and eaten in the Himalayas.

In the southern Appalachian Mountains, some wild ginseng hunters use B. virginianum as "indicator species" to locate the root. This has led to local names for the fern that allude to this role, including sang-find, 'seng sign and 'seng pointer.
