= Showy evening primrose =

Showy evening primrose is a common name for several plants and may refer to:

- Oenothera grandis
- Oenothera speciosa
