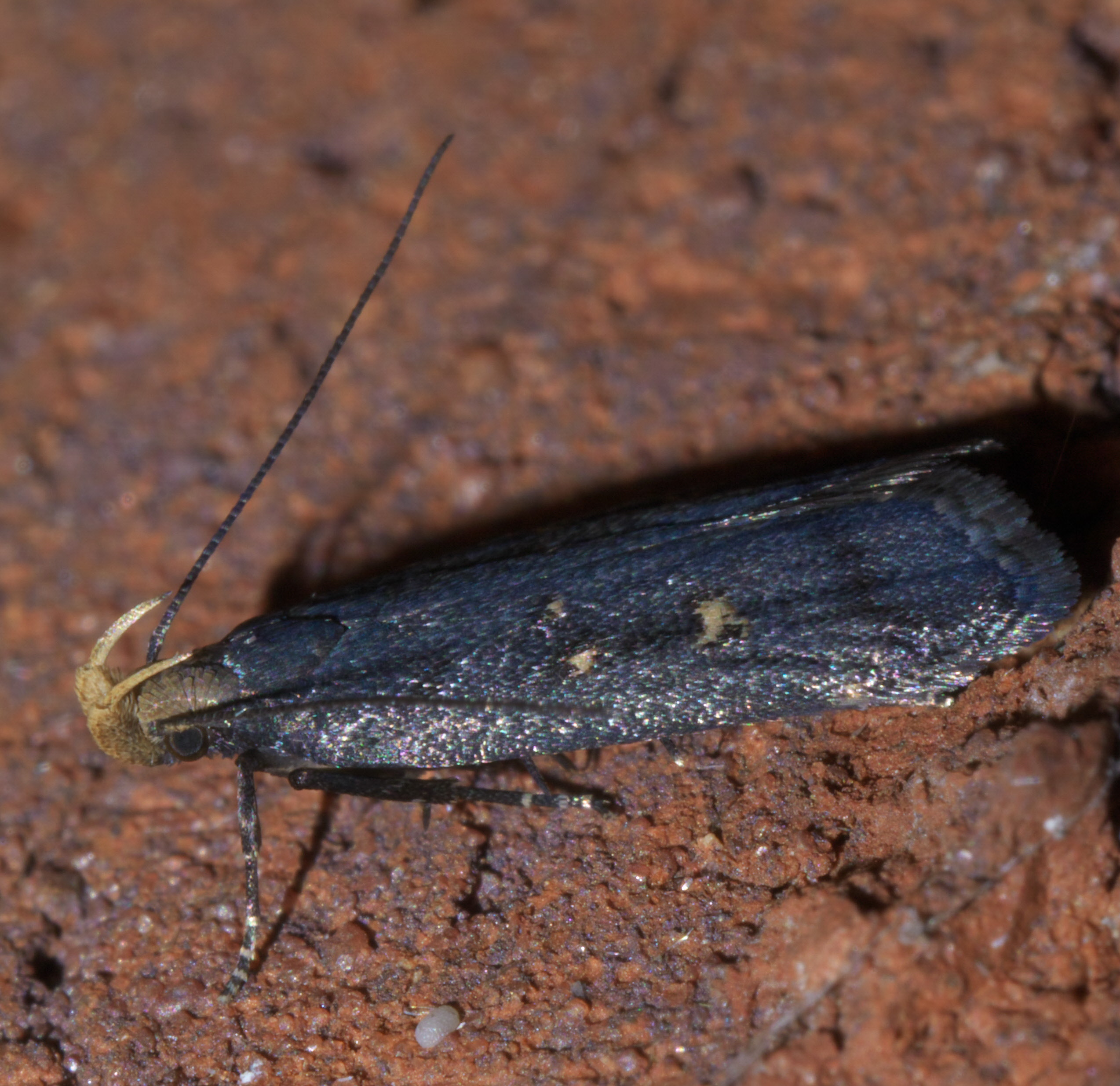

Scientific classification
- Domain: Eukaryota
- Kingdom: Animalia
- Phylum: Arthropoda
- Class: Insecta
- Order: Lepidoptera
- Family: Gelechiidae
- Genus: Dichomeris
- Species: D. agonia

Binomial name
- Dichomeris agonia Hodges, 1986

Synonyms
- Trichotaphe trinotella Busck, 1906 (preocc.)

= Dichomeris agonia =

Species of moth

Dichomeris agonia is a moth in the family Gelechiidae. It is found in North America, where it has been recorded from Ontario, Massachusetts and Illinois to Florida, Louisiana, Arkansas and Pennsylvania.

The wingspan is about 15 mm (0.59 in). Adults have been recorded on wing from January to November.

The larvae feed on Oenothera, Aster and Solidago species.
