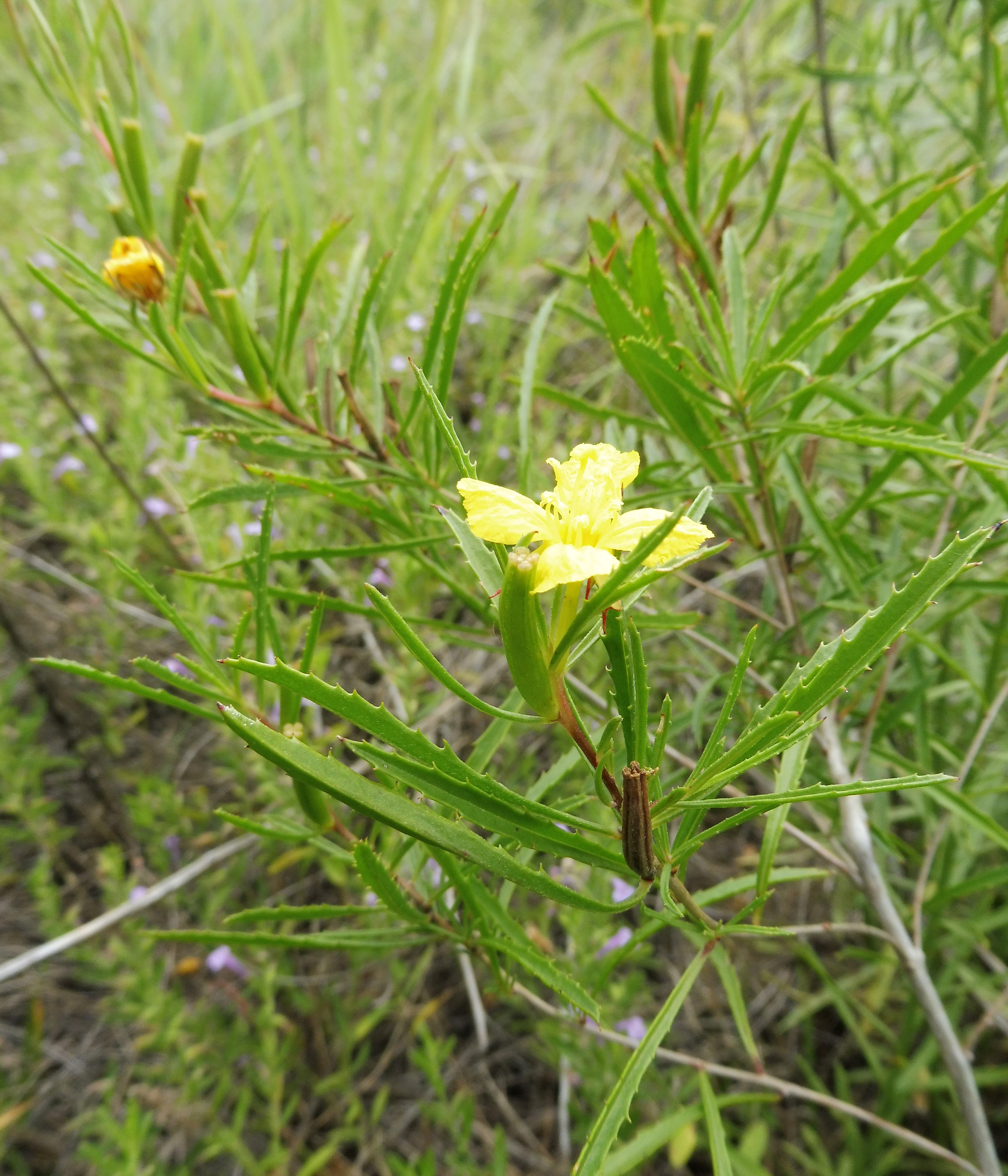

Scientific classification
- Kingdom: Plantae
- Clade: Tracheophytes
- Clade: Angiosperms
- Clade: Eudicots
- Clade: Rosids
- Order: Myrtales
- Family: Onagraceae
- Genus: Oenothera
- Species: O. berlandieri

Binomial name
- Oenothera berlandieri (Spach) Steudel

Synonyms
- Calylophus berlandieri

= Oenothera berlandieri =

Species of flowering plant

Oenothera berlandieri, commonly called Berlandier's sundrops, is a species of flowering plant in the evening primrose family (Onagraceae). It is native to North America, where it is found primarily in the south central region of the United States and in northern Mexico. Its natural habitat is dry prairies, often in rocky or sandy calcareous areas.

Oenothera berlandieri is a bushy, semi-woody perennial. It produces showy yellow flowers in the summer.

== Taxonomy ==
There are two recognized subspecies. They are:

- O. berlandieri ssp. berlandieri - More widespread; typically a sprawling bush, with smaller leaves.
- O. berlandieri ssp. pinifolius - Found in the eastern portion of the species's range; typically an erect herbaceous plant, with larger leaves.
