= Oenothera xylocarpa =

Scientific classification
- Kingdom: Plantae
- Clade: Embryophytes
- Clade: Tracheophytes
- Clade: Spermatophytes
- Clade: Angiosperms
- Clade: Eudicots
- Clade: Rosids
- Order: Myrtales
- Family: Onagraceae
- Genus: Oenothera
- Species: O. xylocarpa

Binomial name
- Oenothera xylocarpa Coville

Species of flowering plant

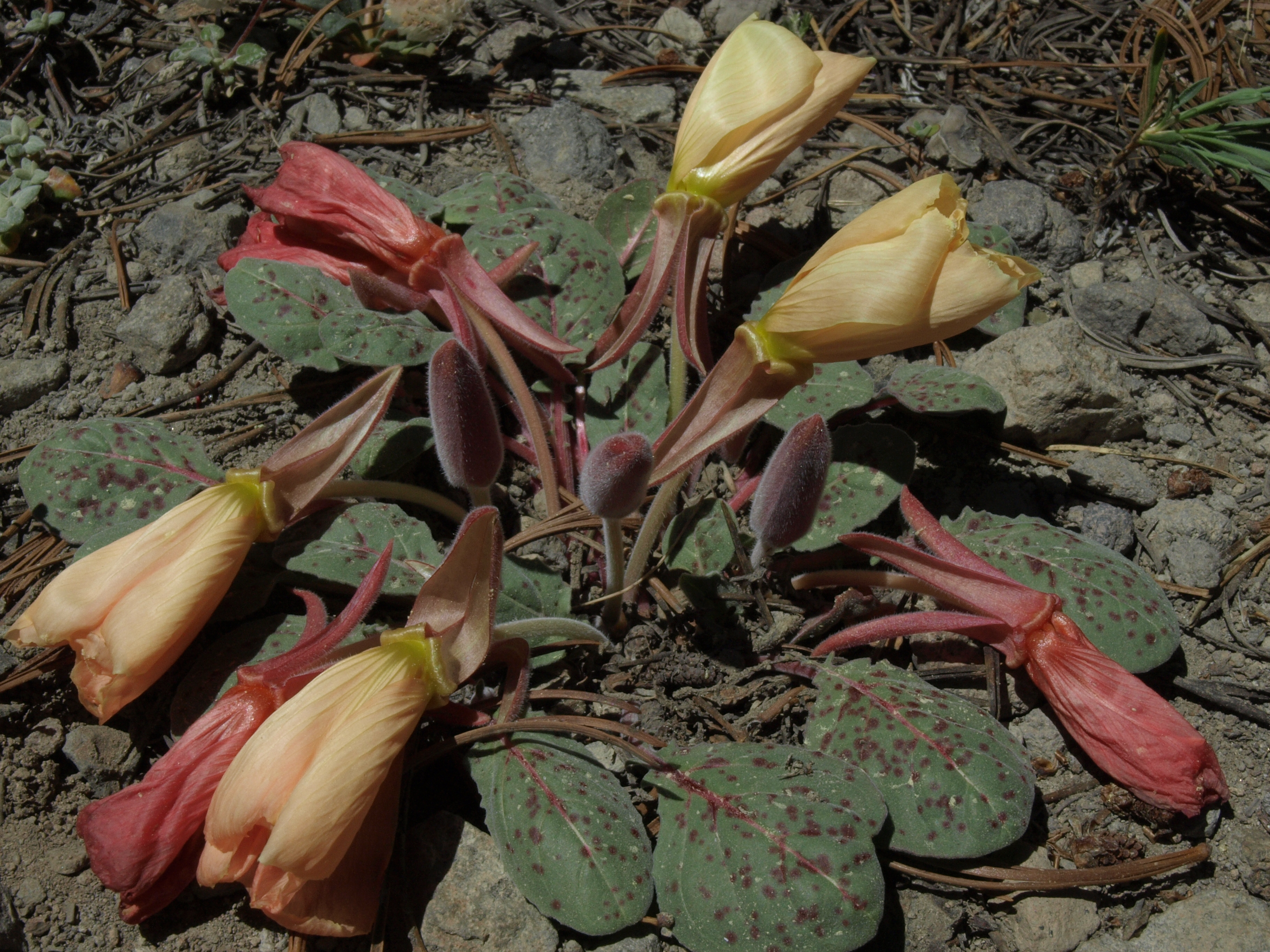
Sierra evening primrose, Oenothera xylocarpa, Sierra Nevada, elevation 2840 m (9320 ft).

Oenothera xylocarpa is a species of flowering plant in the evening primrose family known by the common name woodyfruit evening primrose. It is native to the Sierra Nevada of California, its range extending just into western Nevada. It grows in coniferous forest and meadow habitat, often in soils rich in pumice and other gravel. It is a perennial herb growing from a thick taproot and producing a flat, dense rosette of hairy, gray-green leaves. There is no stem. The showy flowers appear amidst the leaves. Each has four petals which may be nearly 4 centimeters long, bright yellow in color, fading pink to red with age. The fruit is a straight, curving, or twisting capsule which may be up to 9 centimeters long.
