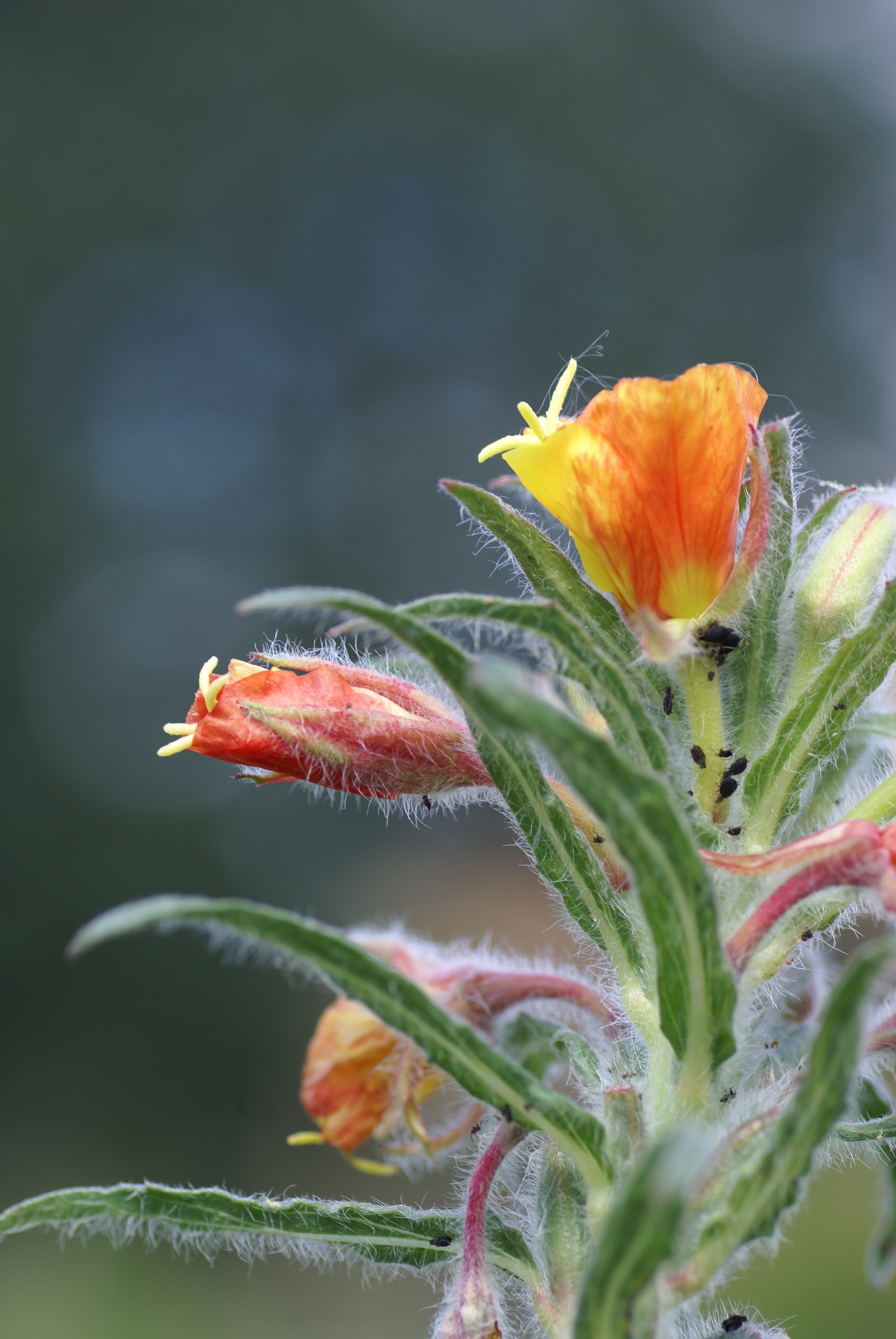

Scientific classification
- Kingdom: Plantae
- Clade: Tracheophytes
- Clade: Angiosperms
- Clade: Eudicots
- Clade: Rosids
- Order: Myrtales
- Family: Onagraceae
- Genus: Oenothera
- Species: O. versicolor

Binomial name
- Oenothera versicolor Lehm.

Synonyms
- Oenothera campylocalyx K.Koch & C.D.Bouché; Oenothera campylocarpa E.Vilm.; Oenothera cinnabarina É.Morren; Oenothera coccinea Britton; Oenothera curvifolia H.P.Fisch.; Oenothera fusca (K.Krause) Sprague & L.Riley; Onagra fusca K.Krause

= Oenothera versicolor =

Species of flowering plant

Oenothera versicolor, the red evening-primrose, is a species of flowering plant in the family Onagraceae. It is native to South America, from Peru and Ecuador down to Bolivia and Northern Argentina This species is not as common in cultivation as other members of the genus but popular cultivars including 'Sunset Boulevard' are grown in gardens around the temperate world as the plant is hardy down to at least −10 °C (14 °F).

Other common names include sundrops, red sundrops, and orange evening-primrose.

== Description ==
Oenothera versicolor is a bushy perennial growing to 1 m (3 ft 3 in) tall. It blooms throughout summer and into early autumn. The flowers grow on spikes and are individually around 8-6cm in diameter with four petals each. The leaves are lanceolate and glossy. The reddish orange flowers appear in clusters around the top of the spike and are hermaphroditic. Unlike in some species of Oenothera, the flowers bloom during the day rather than at night although their superficial similarities to the common evening primrose still earns this species the title of evening-primrose.

The plant is erect and forms a basal rosette of leaves which are narrowly lanceolate and gradually narrow to the petiole. Most plants generally do not branch, instead, forming one main spike. The leaves are 20-25 cm long when mature and 1.5- 3.5 cm wide. The cauline (stem-growing) leaves are narrowly lanceolate, 8-12 cm long and 0.6-2 cm wide. They are usually sessile but may possess with a short petiole. The leaf margins are reddish, especially in the bracts of the young buds, and the inflorescence is mostly unbranched. Flowers have a corolla length of 1.2-2.5 cm and buds are reddish at the junction of the sepals with the corolla. The petals very broadly obovate, rounded or retuse, 1.2-2 cm long, yellow, red near the base and along the veins or entirely red. The anthers are 5-8 mm long with filaments 6-10 mm long. The style is mostly short so the anthers may shed pollen directly on the stigma. The ovary is 8-10 mm in length. The seeds of the Red Evening-primrose form in capsules which are generally around 1.5-3 cm long, 5-9 mm thick and dark in colour when ripe. The seeds themselves are small at little more than a millimetre in length and slightly oval in shape.
