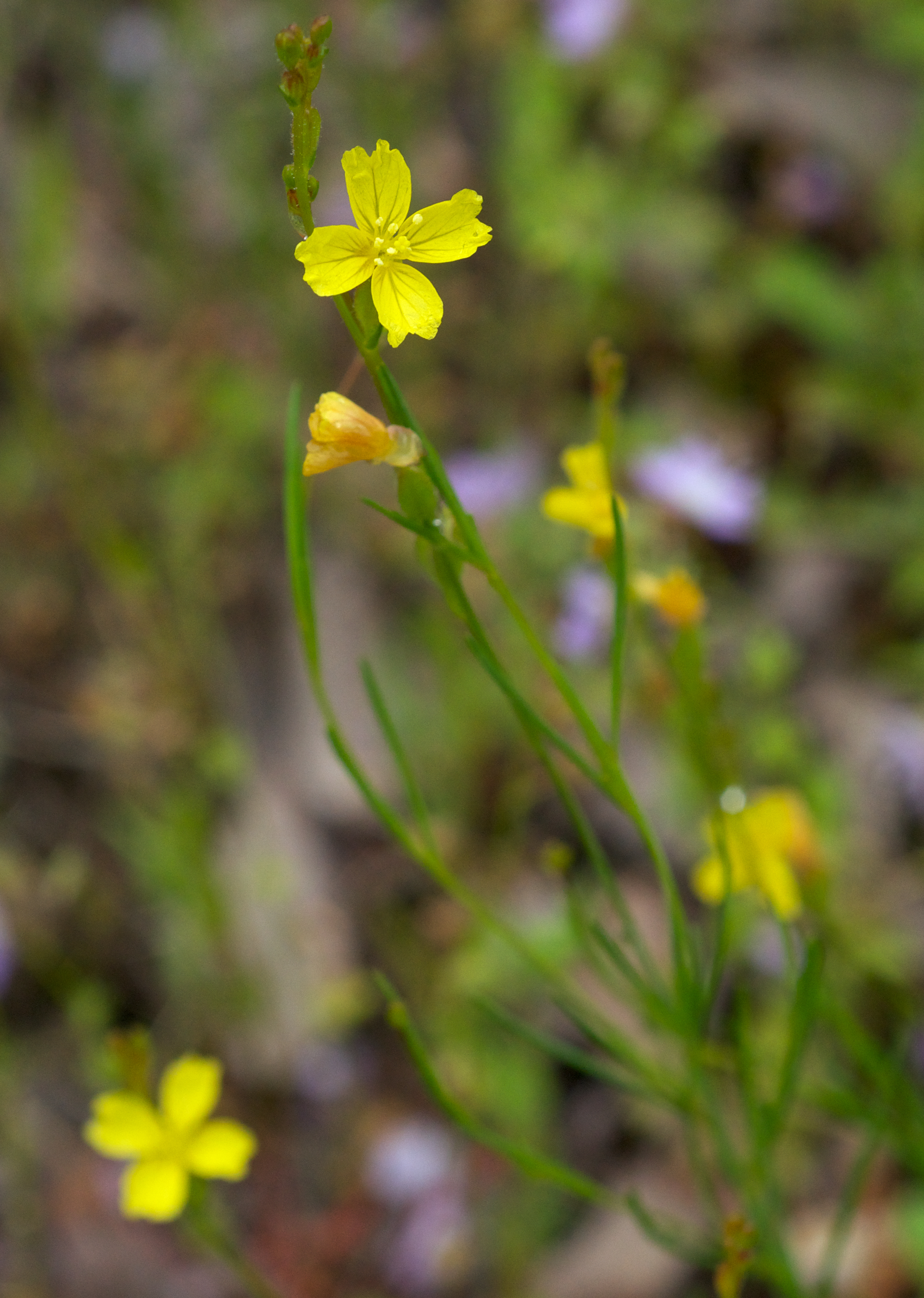

Scientific classification
- Kingdom: Plantae
- Clade: Tracheophytes
- Clade: Angiosperms
- Clade: Eudicots
- Clade: Rosids
- Order: Myrtales
- Family: Onagraceae
- Genus: Oenothera
- Species: O. linifolia

Binomial name
- Oenothera linifolia Nutt.

= Oenothera linifolia =

Species of flowering plant

Oenothera linifolia is a species of flowering plant in the evening primrose family known by the common name threadleaf evening primrose. It is native to the southeastern United States. It is an annual herb growing up to 20 in (51 cm) tall.
