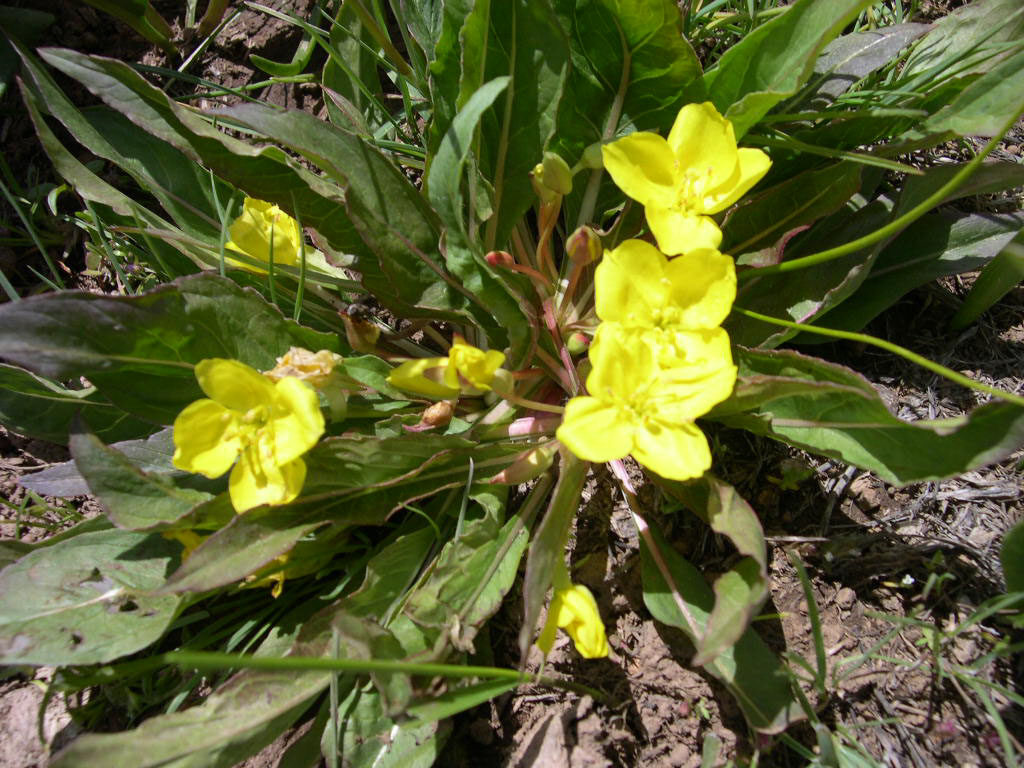
- Habit

Conservation status
- Secure (NatureServe)

Scientific classification
- Kingdom: Plantae
- Clade: Tracheophytes
- Clade: Angiosperms
- Clade: Eudicots
- Clade: Rosids
- Order: Myrtales
- Family: Onagraceae
- Genus: Oenothera
- Species: O. flava

Binomial name
- Oenothera flava (A.Nelson) Garrett

Synonyms
- List: Lavauxia flava A.Nelson; Lavauxia hamata Wooton & Standl.; Lavauxia palustris Rose; Lavauxia taraxacoides Wooton & Standl.; Oenothera flava subsp. taraxacoides (Wooton & Standl.) W.L.Wagner; Oenothera hamata (Wooton & Standl.) Tidestr.; Oenothera murdockii S.L.Welsh & N.D.Atwood; Oenothera taraxacifolia var. ecristata (M.E.Jones) H.Lév. & Guffroy; Oenothera taraxacoides (Wooton & Standl.) Munz; Oenothera triloba var. ecristata M.E.Jones

= Oenothera flava =

Plant species in the evening primrose family

Oenothera flava, the yellow evening primrose (a name it shares with Oenothera serrulata), is a species of flowering plant in the family Onagraceae. It is native to western Canada (except British Columbia), the western and central United States, and Mexico (except southeastern Mexico), and it has been introduced to the former Czechoslovakia. An almost stemless perennial reaching 20 cm (8 in), it is typically found in damp situations such as prairie swales, open woodlands, and alongside streams.
