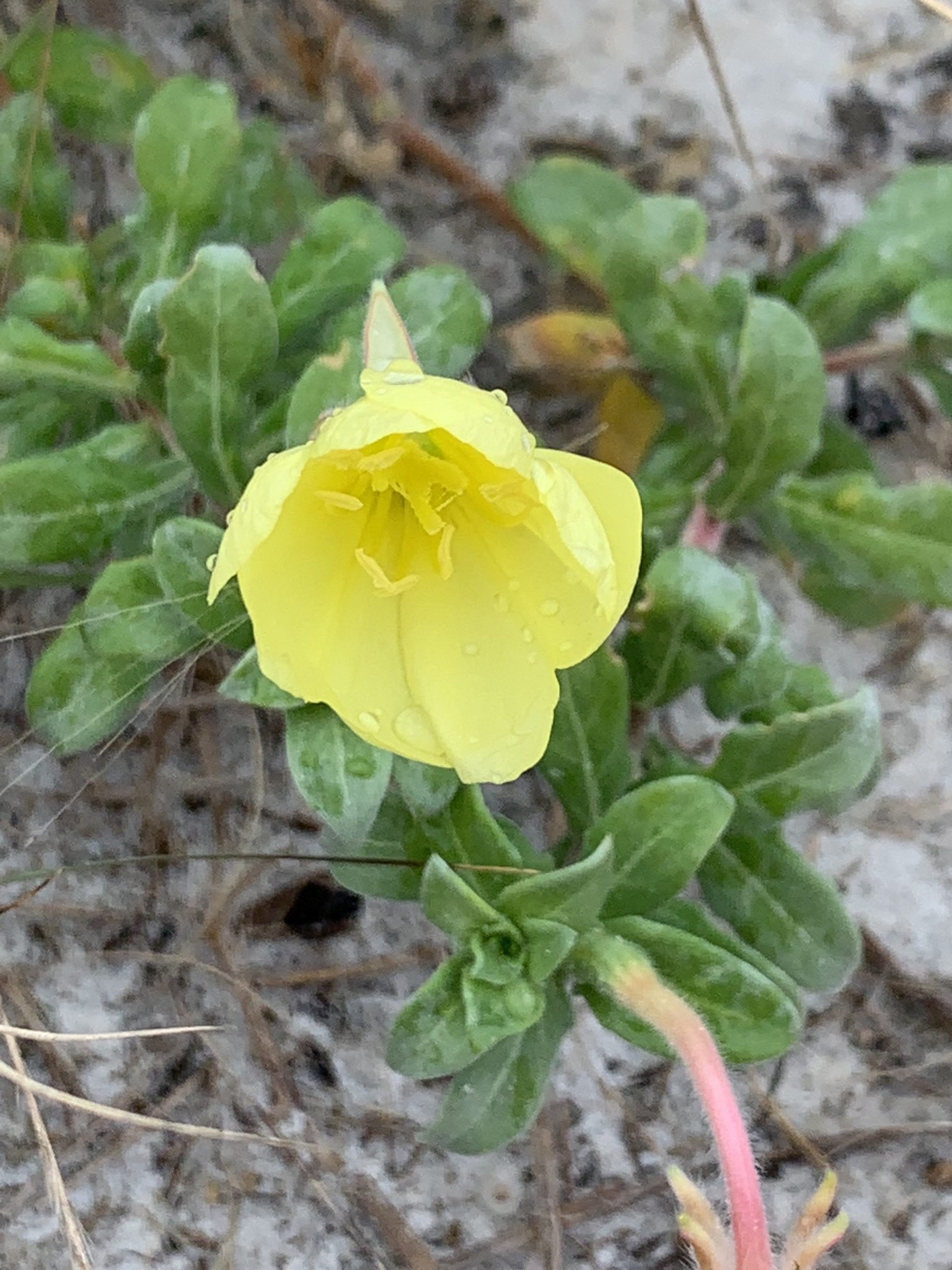
- At the beach, Sarasota, Florida

Conservation status
- Secure (NatureServe)

Scientific classification
- Kingdom: Plantae
- Clade: Tracheophytes
- Clade: Angiosperms
- Clade: Eudicots
- Clade: Rosids
- Order: Myrtales
- Family: Onagraceae
- Genus: Oenothera
- Species: O. humifusa

Binomial name
- Oenothera humifusa Nutt.

Synonyms
- Oenothera humifusa f. erecta H.Lév. ex Thell. & Zimm.; Oenothera niveifolia Gand.; Oenothera sinuata var. humifusa (Nutt.) Torr. & A.Gray; Raimannia humifusa (Nutt.) Rose ex Britton & A.Br.

= Oenothera humifusa =

Species of plant

Oenothera humifusa, the seabeach evening primrose or spreading evening primrose, is a species of flowering plant in the family Onagraceae. It is native to the beaches of Bermuda and the eastern United States from Louisiana to New Jersey, and it has been introduced to Cuba. It is a decumbent perennial.
