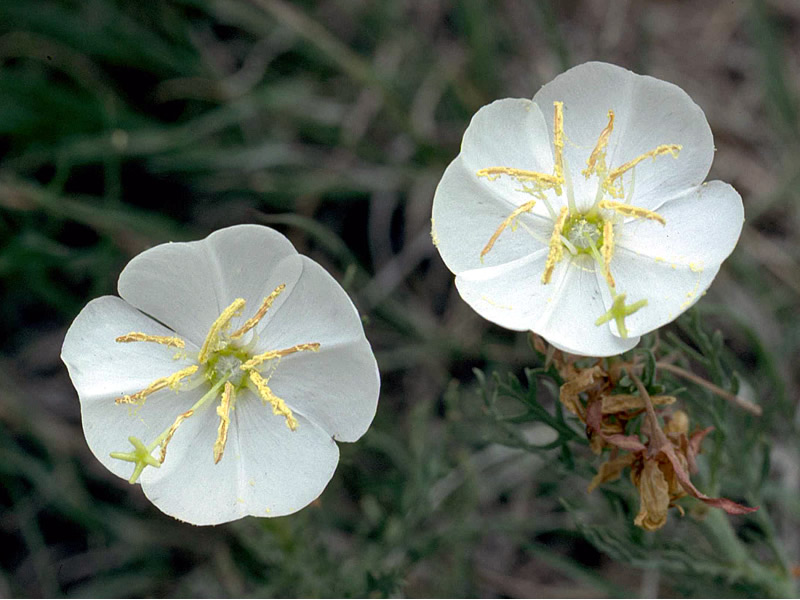

Conservation status
- Secure (NatureServe)

Scientific classification
- Kingdom: Plantae
- Clade: Tracheophytes
- Clade: Angiosperms
- Clade: Eudicots
- Clade: Rosids
- Order: Myrtales
- Family: Onagraceae
- Genus: Oenothera
- Species: O. coronopifolia

Binomial name
- Oenothera coronopifolia Torr. & A.Gray

Synonyms
- Anogra coronopifolia; Raimannia coronopifolia

= Oenothera coronopifolia =

Plant species in the evening primrose family

Oenothera coronopifolia, the crownleaf evening primrose, is a plant species. The Zuni people apply a poultice of the powdered flower and saliva night to swellings.
