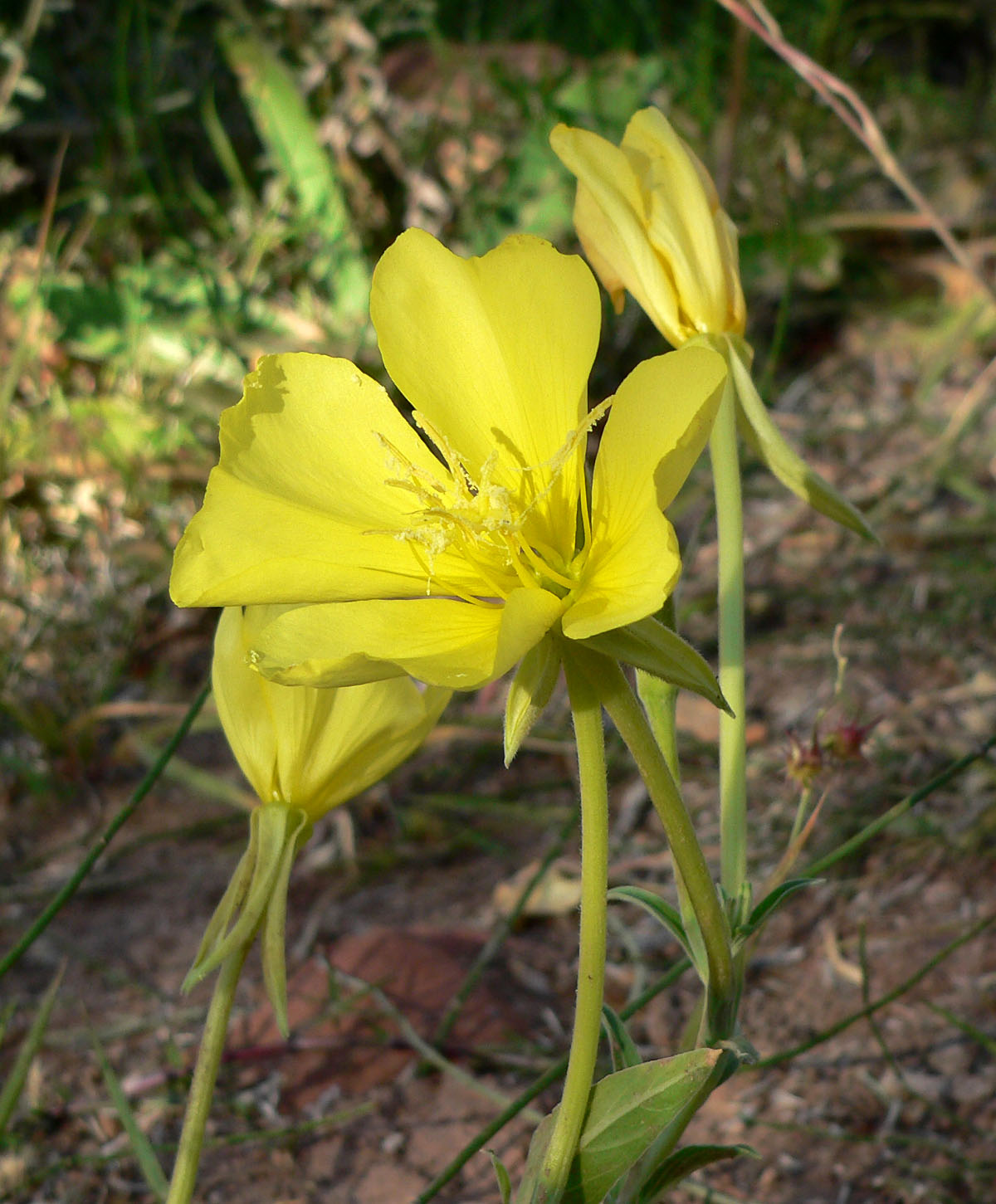

Conservation status
- Apparently Secure (NatureServe)

Scientific classification
- Kingdom: Plantae
- Clade: Tracheophytes
- Clade: Angiosperms
- Clade: Eudicots
- Clade: Rosids
- Order: Myrtales
- Family: Onagraceae
- Genus: Oenothera
- Species: O. longissima

Binomial name
- Oenothera longissima Rydb.

Synonyms
- Oenothera clutei

= Oenothera longissima =

Plant species in the evening primrose family

Oenothera longissima is a species of flowering plant in the evening primrose family known by the common name longstem evening primrose. It is native to the southwestern United States, where it grows in relatively moist areas in scrub and woodland habitat. This is a biennial herb producing a tall, erect stem known to well exceed 2 meters in height. The widely lance-shaped leaves may be 22 centimeters in length and may have slight teeth along the edges. The inflorescence is a spike of showy large flowers. Each has yellow petals which may be more than 6 centimeters in length and fade orange or red with age. The fruit is a lance-shaped capsule up to 5.5 centimeters long.

== Taxonomy ==
Oenothera longissima was scientifically described and named by botanist Per Axel Rydberg in 1913. It is part of the genus Oenothera in the Onagraceae family. The species has no accepted subspecies or varieties, but it has 4 synonyms.

Table of Synonyms
Name	Year	Rank	Notes
Oenothera clutei A.Nelson	1922	species	= het.
Oenothera longissima subsp. typica Munz	1949	subspecies	≡ hom., not validly publ.
Oenothera longissima var. clutei (A.Nelson) Munz	1949	variety	= het.
Oenothera longissima subsp. clutei (A.Nelson) Munz	1949	subspecies	= het.
Notes: ≡ homotypic synonym; = heterotypic synonym
