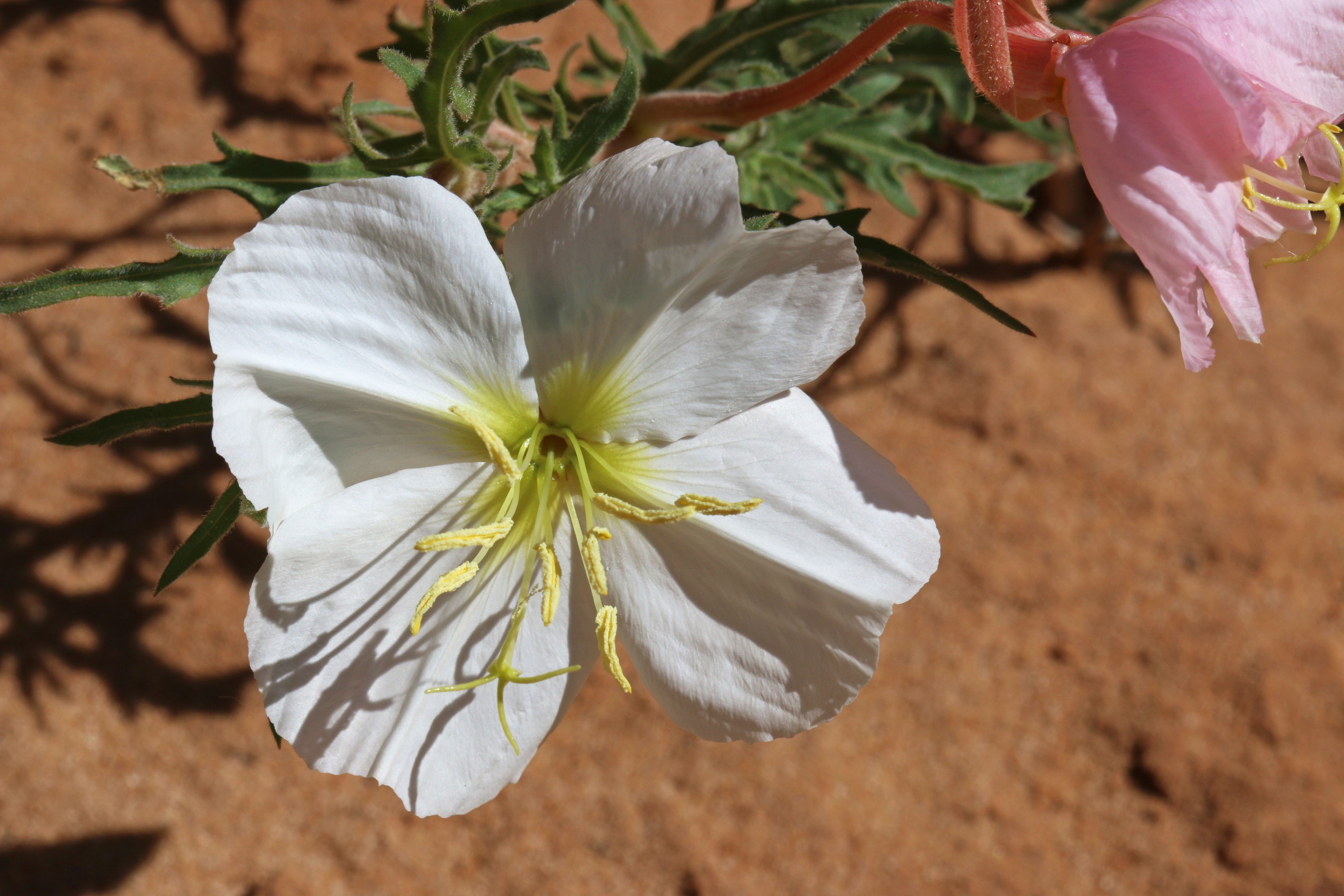
- Close up of flowers
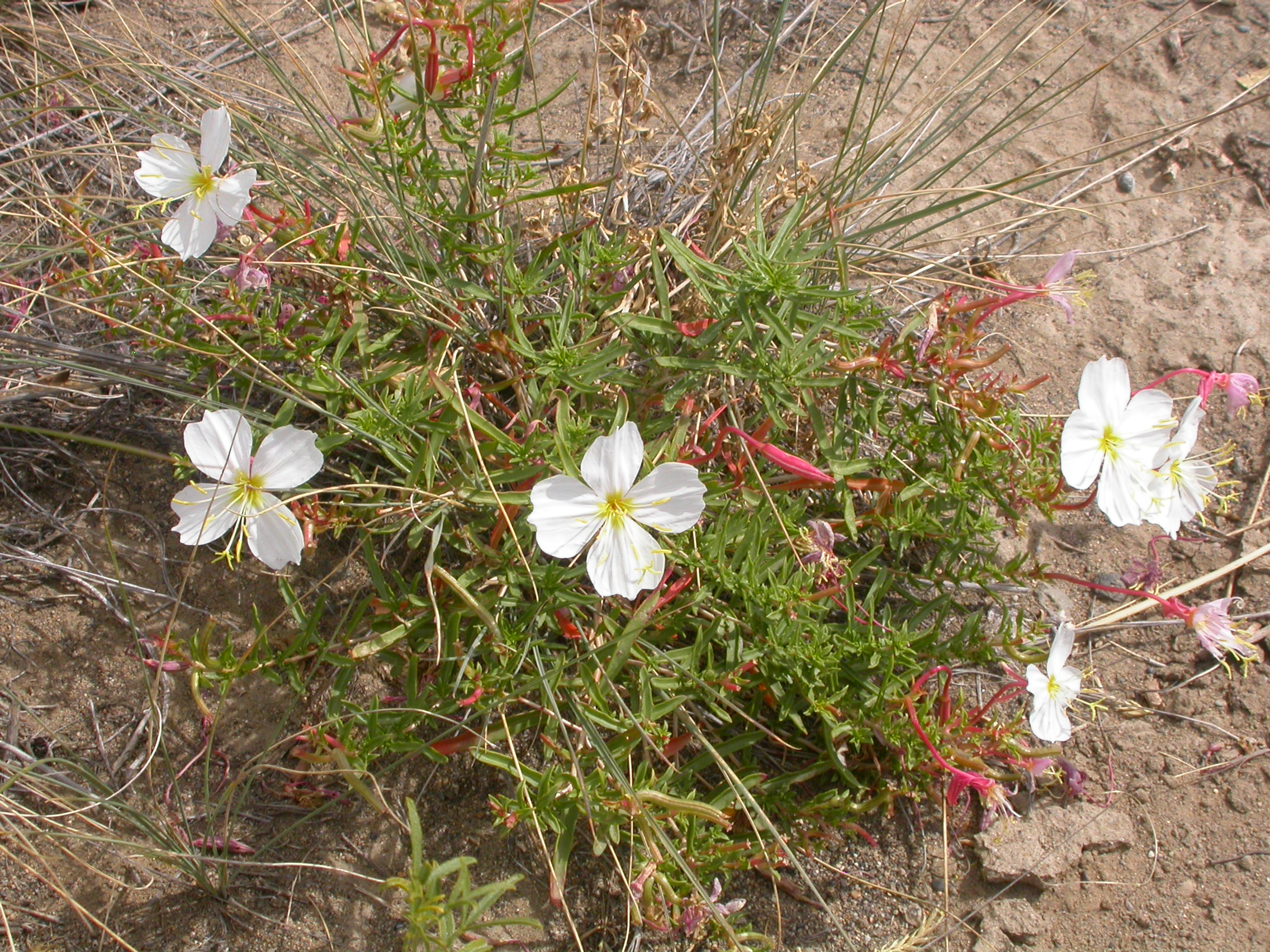
- Habit

Scientific classification
- Kingdom: Plantae
- Clade: Tracheophytes
- Clade: Angiosperms
- Clade: Eudicots
- Clade: Rosids
- Order: Myrtales
- Family: Onagraceae
- Genus: Oenothera
- Species: O. pallida

Binomial name
- Oenothera pallida Lindl.

Subspecies
- O. p. subsp. latifolia; O. p. subsp. pallida; O. p. subsp. runcinata; O. p. subsp. trichocalyx

Synonyms
- List: Anogra cinerea; Anogra gypsophila; Anogra latifolia; Anogra leucotricha; Anogra pallida; Anogra rhizomata; Anogra runcinata; Anogra trichocalyx; Anogra violacea; Anogra vreelandii; Baumannia douglasiana; Oenothera latifolia; Oenothera runcinata; Oenothera trichocalyx; Oenothera wislizeni

= Oenothera pallida =

Plant species in the evening primrose family

Oenothera pallida, the pale evening-primrose, is a species of flowering plant in the family Onagraceae. It is native to British Columbia, the western United States, and northern Mexico. Flowers start out white and fade to pink.

== Taxonomy ==
Oenothera pallida was scientifically described and named by John Lindley in 1828. It is part of the genus Oenothera in the Onagraceae family.

The following subspecies are accepted:

- Oenothera pallida subsp. latifolia (Rydb.) Munz – Colorado, Kansas, Nebraska, New Mexico, Oklahoma, South Dakota, Utah, Wyoming
- Oenothera pallida subsp. pallida – British Columbia, Arizona, Colorado, Idaho, Nevada, New Mexico, Oregon, Utah, Washington, Wyoming
- Oenothera pallida subsp. runcinata (Engelm.) Munz & W.E.Klein – Arizona, Colorado, New Mexico, Texas, Utah, northern Mexico
- Oenothera pallida subsp. trichocalyx (Nutt.) Munz & W.E.Klein – Arizona, Colorado, New Mexico, Utah, Wyoming

It has 41 synonyms of the species or one of its four subspecies.

Table of Synonyms
Name	Year	Rank	Synonym of:	Notes
Anogra cinerea Rydb.	1904	species	subsp. latifolia	= het.
Anogra gypsophila (Eastw.) A.Heller	1900	species	subsp. runcinata	= het.
Anogra latifolia (Rydb.) Rydb.	1904	species	subsp. latifolia	≡ hom.
Anogra leucotricha Wooton & Standl.	1913	species	subsp. runcinata	= het.
Anogra pallida (Lindl.) Britton	1894	species	O. pallida	≡ hom.
Anogra pallida var. brevifolia (Engelm.) Small	1896	variety	subsp. runcinata	= het.
Anogra pallida var. latifolia (Rydb.) Small	1896	variety	subsp. latifolia	≡ hom.
Anogra pallida var. runcinata (Engelm.) Small	1896	variety	subsp. runcinata	≡ hom.
Anogra rhizomata A.Nelson	1899	species	subsp. trichocalyx	= het.
Anogra runcinata (Engelm.) Wooton & Standl.	1913	species	subsp. runcinata	≡ hom.
Anogra trichocalyx (Nutt.) Small	1896	species	subsp. trichocalyx	≡ hom.
Anogra violacea A.Nelson	1904	species	subsp. trichocalyx	= het.
Anogra vreelandii Rydb.	1904	species	subsp. trichocalyx	= het.
Baumannia douglasiana Spach	1835	species	O. pallida	≡ hom., nom. superfl.
Oenothera albicaulis var. brevifolia Engelm.	1862	variety	subsp. runcinata	= het.
Oenothera albicaulis var. gypsophila Eastw.	1897	variety	subsp. runcinata	= het.
Oenothera albicaulis var. pallida (Lindl.) H.Lév.	1909	variety	O. pallida	≡ hom.
Oenothera albicaulis var. runcinata Engelm.	1862	variety	subsp. runcinata	≡ hom.
Oenothera albicaulis var. trichocalyx (Nutt.) Engelm.	1862	variety	subsp. trichocalyx	≡ hom.
Oenothera latifolia (Rydb.) Munz	1931	species	subsp. latifolia	≡ hom.
Oenothera pallida subsp. gypsophila (Eastw.) Munz & W.E.Klein	1965	subspecies	subsp. runcinata	= het.
Oenothera pallida var. idahoensis Munz	1931	variety	subsp. pallida	= het.
Oenothera pallida var. latifolia Rydb.	1895	variety	subsp. latifolia	≡ hom.
Oenothera pallida var. runcinata (Engelm.) Cronquist	1992	variety	subsp. runcinata	≡ hom.
Oenothera pallida var. trichocalyx (Nutt.) Dorn	1988	variety	subsp. trichocalyx	≡ hom.
Oenothera pallida var. typica Munz	1931	variety	O. pallida	≡ hom., not validly publ.
Oenothera runcinata (Engelm.) Munz	1931	species	subsp. runcinata	≡ hom.
Oenothera runcinata var. brevifolia (Engelm.) Munz	1931	variety	subsp. runcinata	= het.
Oenothera runcinata var. gypsophila (Eastw.) Munz	1931	variety	subsp. runcinata	= het.
Oenothera runcinata var. leucotricha (Wooton & Standl.) Munz	1931	variety	subsp. runcinata	= het.
Oenothera runcinata var. typica Munz	1931	variety	subsp. runcinata	≡ hom., not validly publ.
Oenothera tetragona var. latifolia (Rydb.) Fernald	1949	variety	subsp. latifolia	≡ hom.
Oenothera tetragona f. latifolia (Rydb.) Munz	1937	form	subsp. latifolia	≡ hom.
Oenothera trichocalyx f. acaulis H.Lév.	1909	form	subsp. trichocalyx	= het.
Oenothera trichocalyx f. albicauloidea H.Lév.	1909	form	subsp. trichocalyx	= het.
Oenothera trichocalyx f. heterophylla H.Lév.	1909	form	subsp. trichocalyx	= het.
Oenothera trichocalyx f. mollis H.Lév.	1909	form	subsp. trichocalyx	= het.
Oenothera trichocalyx f. refracta H.Lév.	1909	form	subsp. trichocalyx	= het.
Oenothera trichocalyx Nutt.	1840	species	subsp. trichocalyx	≡ hom.
Oenothera trichocalyx var. piperi Jeps.	1936	variety	subsp. trichocalyx	= het.
Oenothera wislizeni H.Lév.	1909	species	subsp. runcinata	= het.
Notes: ≡ homotypic synonym; = heterotypic synonym

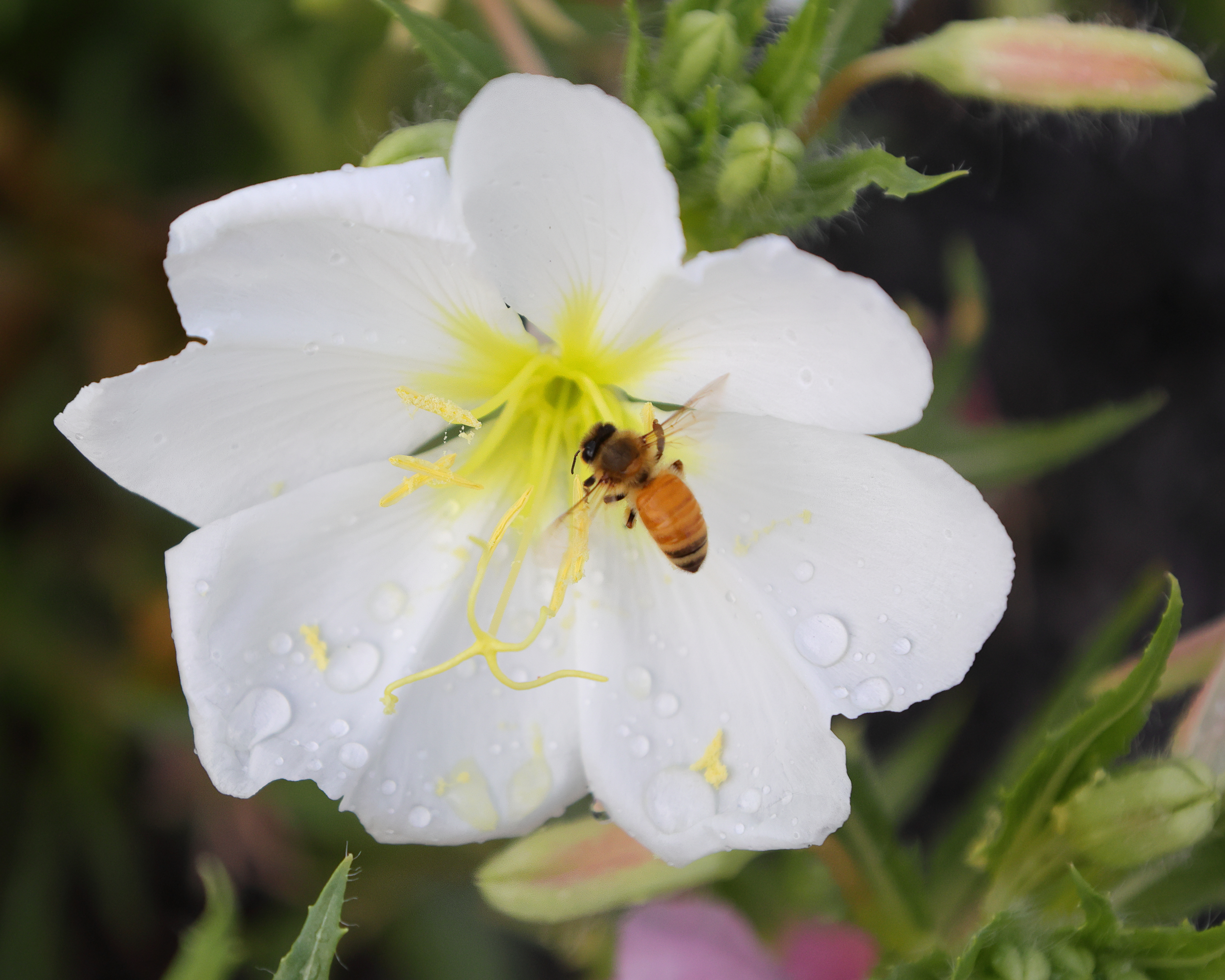
A visit by a bee

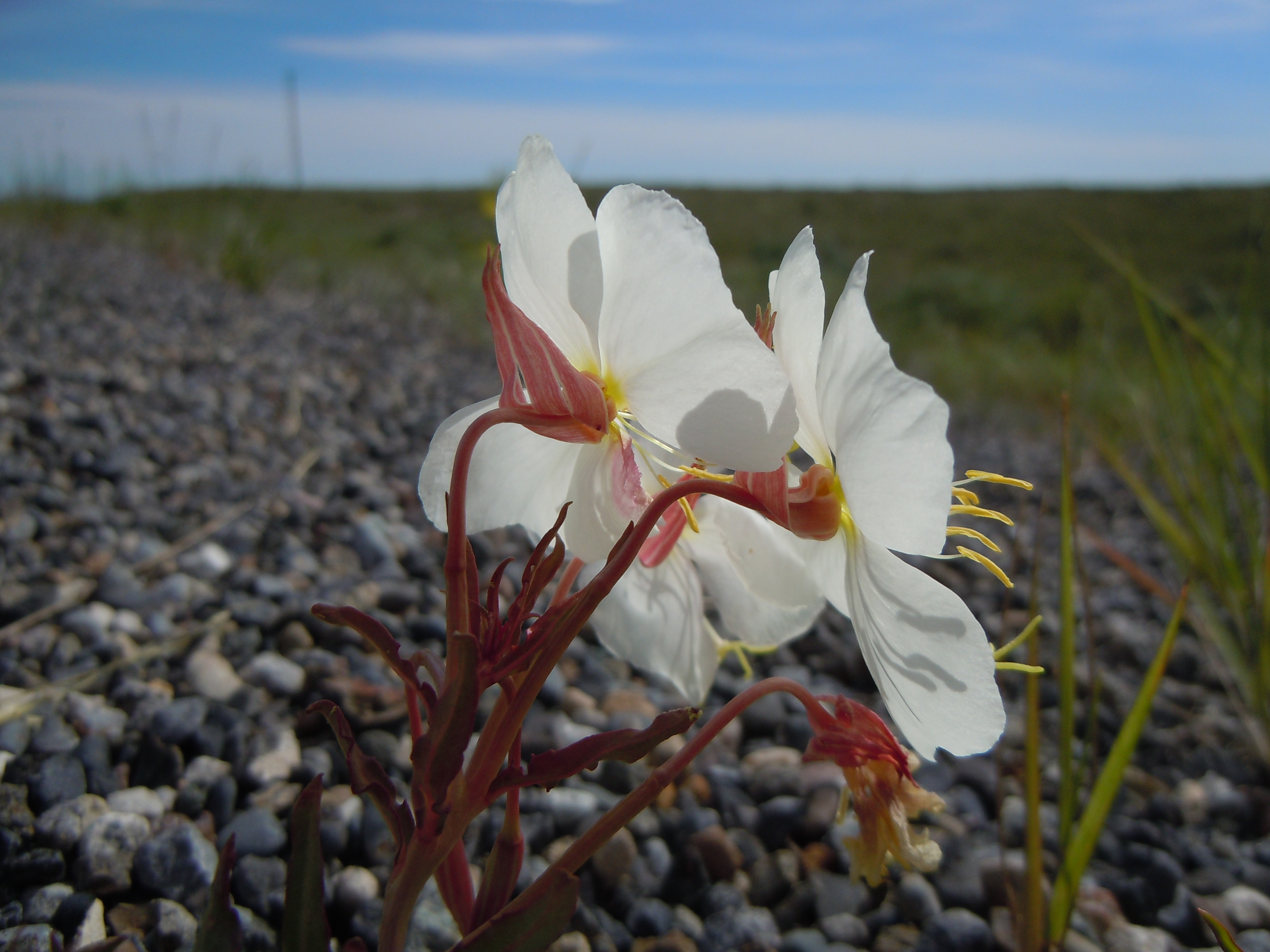
Backside of flowers

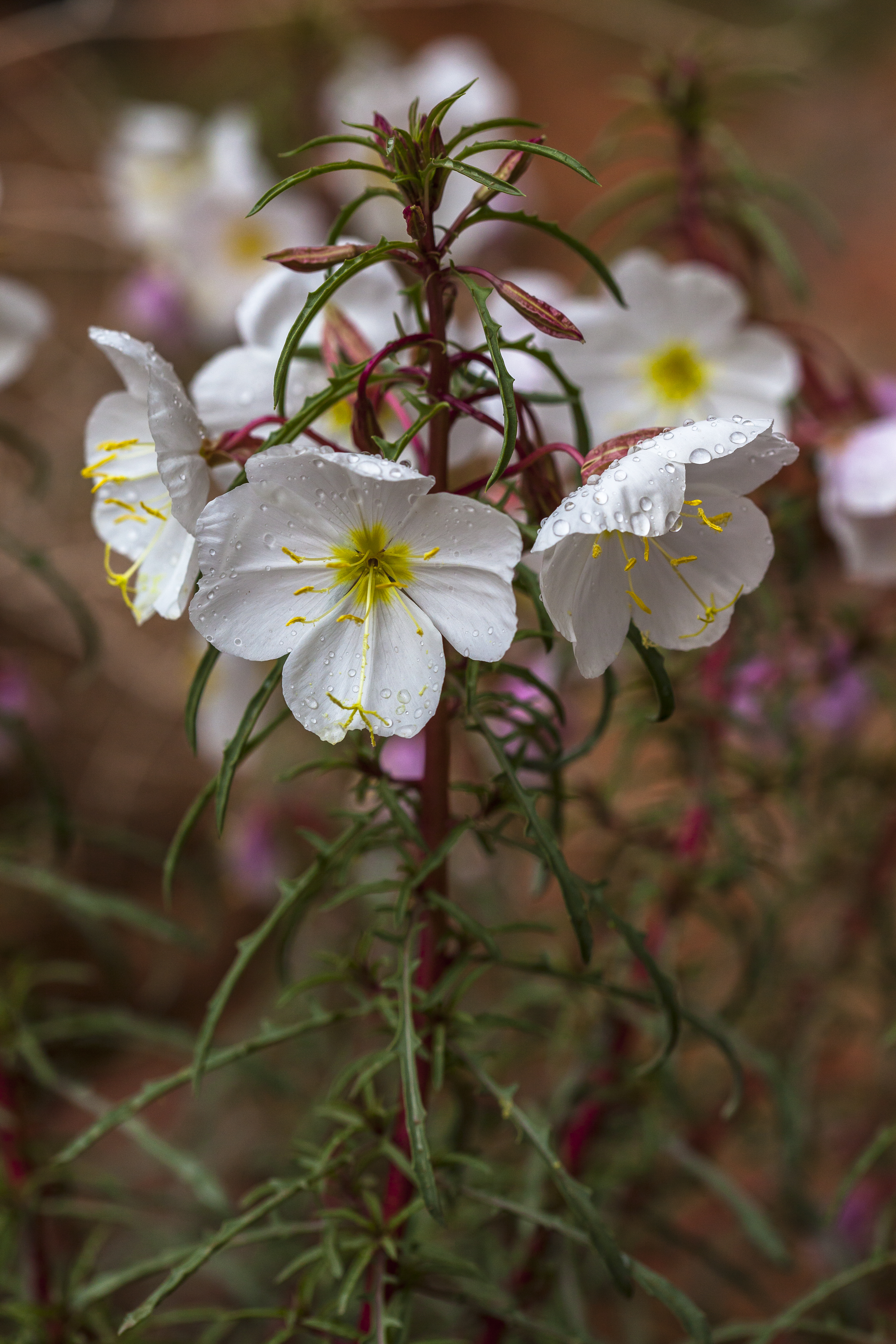
Flowers unfurling
