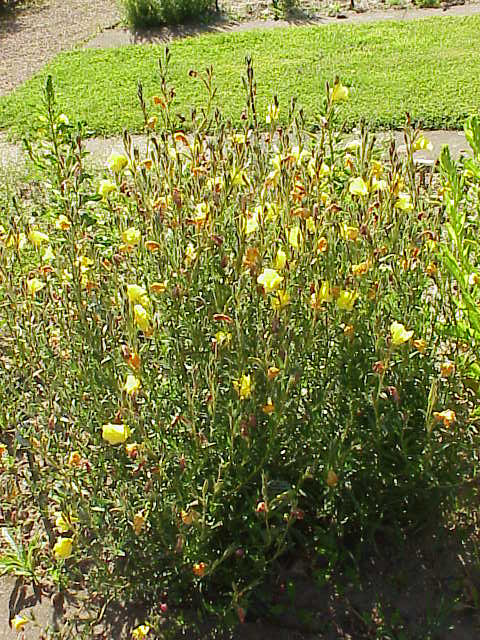

Scientific classification
- Kingdom: Plantae
- Clade: Tracheophytes
- Clade: Angiosperms
- Clade: Eudicots
- Clade: Rosids
- Order: Myrtales
- Family: Onagraceae
- Genus: Oenothera
- Species: O. odorata

Binomial name
- Oenothera odorata Jacq.

= Oenothera odorata =

Species of flowering plant

Oenothera odorata is a perennial plant belonging to the genus Oenothera and native to South America.

Oenothera odorata grows to 60–90 cm (24–36 in) tall. It flowers in summer with yellow flowers which become red in time.
