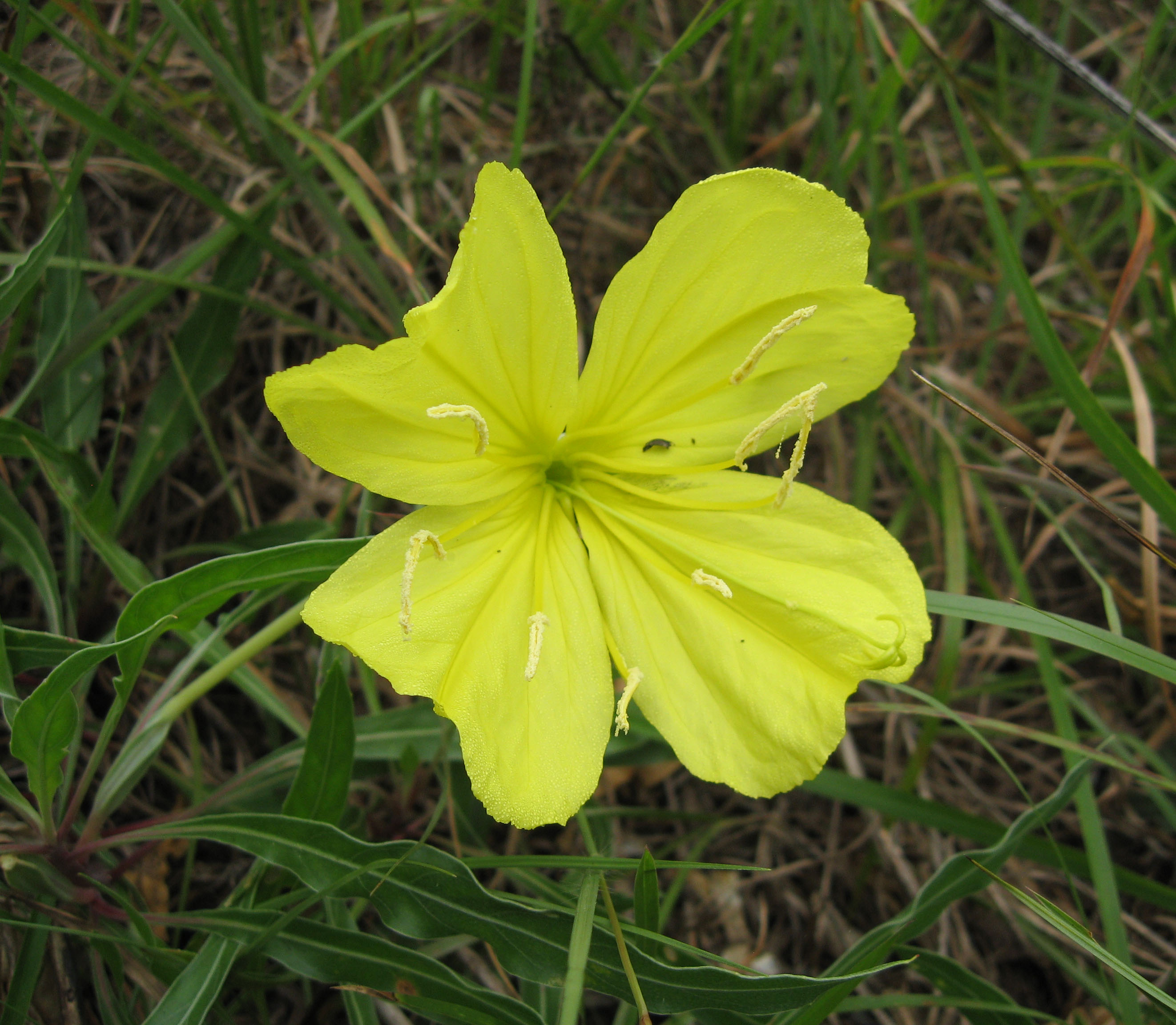

Conservation status
- Secure (NatureServe)

Scientific classification
- Kingdom: Plantae
- Clade: Tracheophytes
- Clade: Angiosperms
- Clade: Eudicots
- Clade: Rosids
- Order: Myrtales
- Family: Onagraceae
- Genus: Oenothera
- Species: O. macrocarpa

Binomial name
- Oenothera macrocarpa Nutt.

= Oenothera macrocarpa =

Species of flowering plant

Oenothera macrocarpa (syn. Oenothera missouriensis), the bigfruit evening primrose, Ozark sundrops, Missouri evening primrose, or Missouri primrose, is a species of flowering plant in the evening primrose family Onagraceae, native to northeast Mexico and the south-central United States, where it is found in calcareous prairies and limestone outcrops.

== Description ==
This herbaceous perennial produces a red stem up to 46 cm (18 in) in height. The plant can sprawl along the ground up to 0.6 m (2 ft). Leaves are long and narrow, about 15 cm (6 in) long by 3 cm (1 in) across, and are densely crowded in an alternate arrangement along the stem. They have either smooth margins or broadly spaced teeth and are hairy.

The large flowers, up to 13 cm (5 in) across, are cup shaped with four petals, canary yellow, and have a mild fragrance. They are produced in great numbers from early to mid summer. The flowers last for one day, opening in the evening and closing the following morning. Each flower has a very long floral tube 10–11 cm (3.9–4.3 in) in length, The seed pods are 4-winged and 52–75 mm (2–3 in) long.

== Taxonomy ==
There are five commonly accepted varieties. These are:

- O. macrocarpa var. fremontii - restricted to Kansas and southern Nebraska
- O. macrocarpa var. incana - southern Kansas, western Oklahoma and northern Texas
- O. macrocarpa var. macrocarpa - the most widespread; Texas to the Ozark Mountains, with disjunct populations in Tennessee's Nashville Basin
- O. macrocarpa var. mexicana - known only from Coahuila, Mexico
- O. macrocarpa var. oklahomensis - southern Kansas, Oklahoma and northern Texas
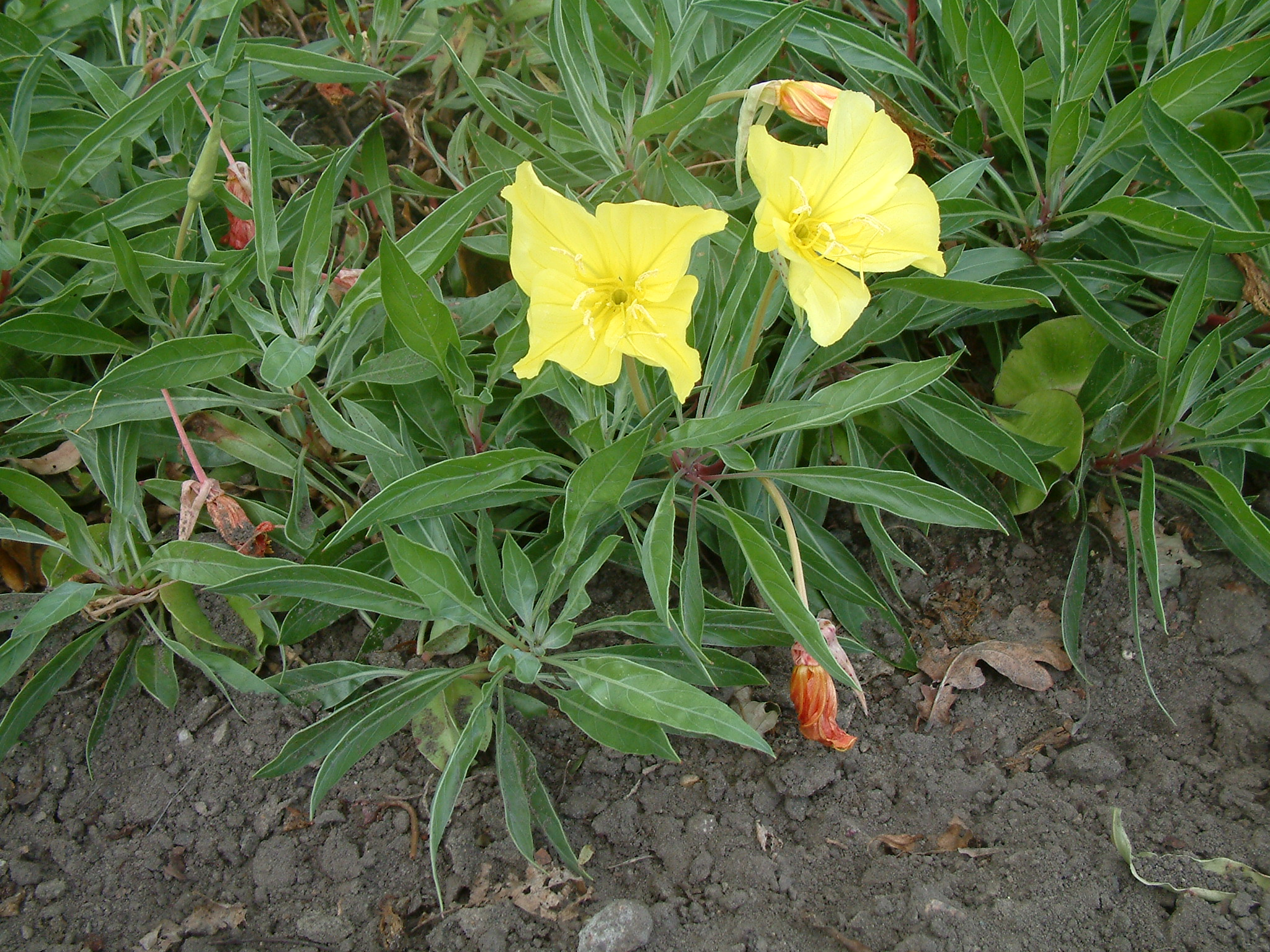
O. m. subsp. macrocarpa

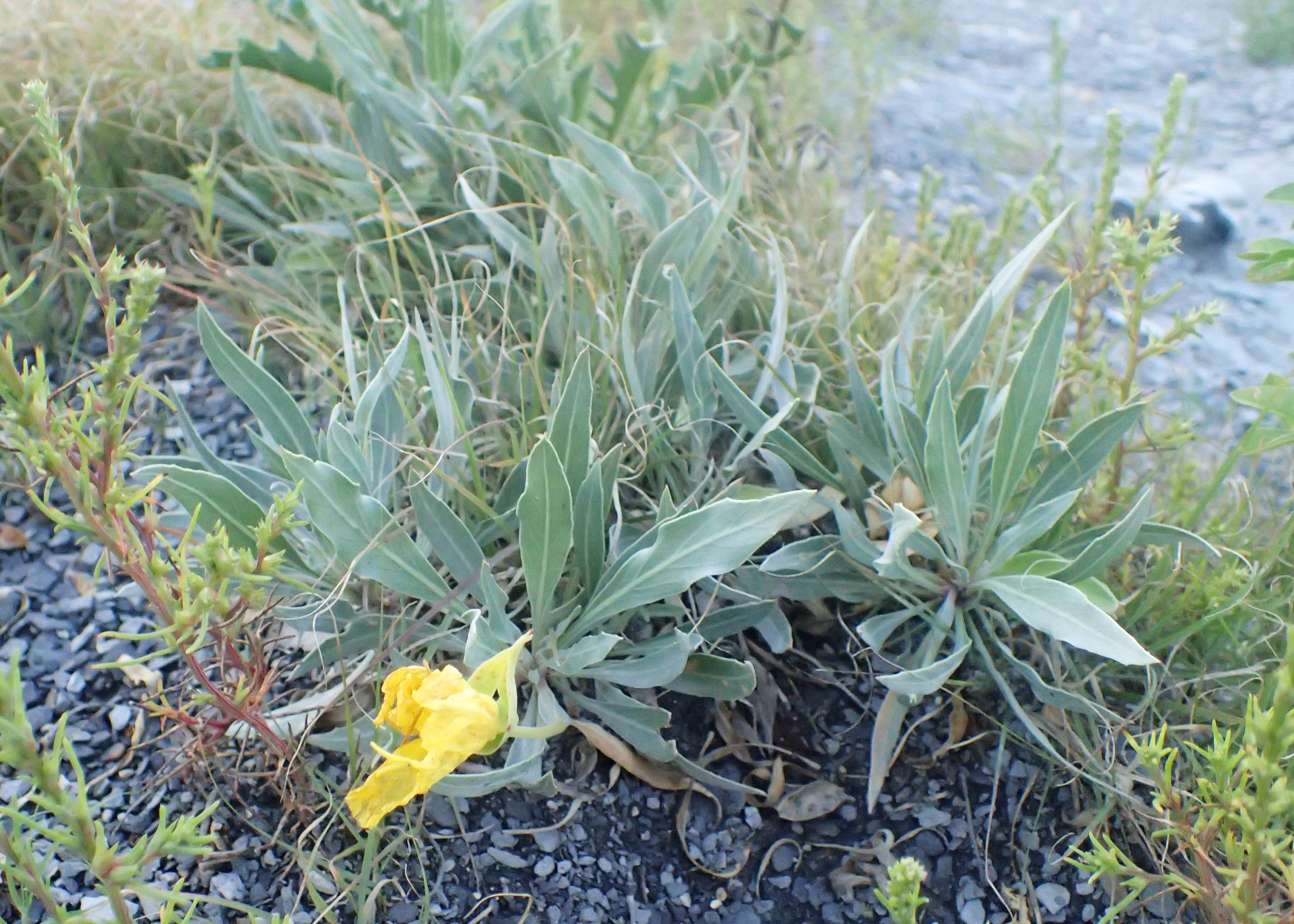
O. m. subsp. incana

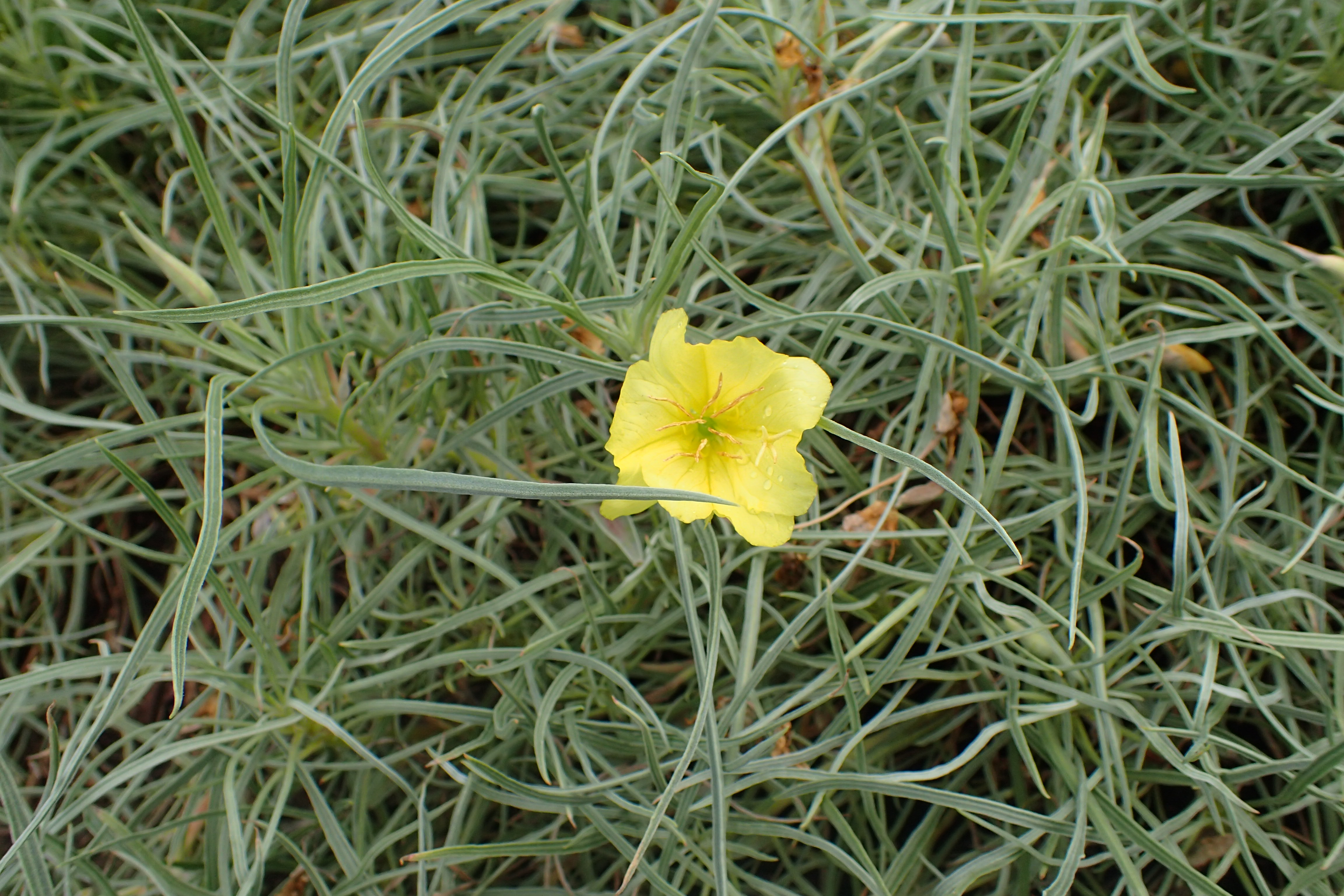
O. m. subsp. fremontii

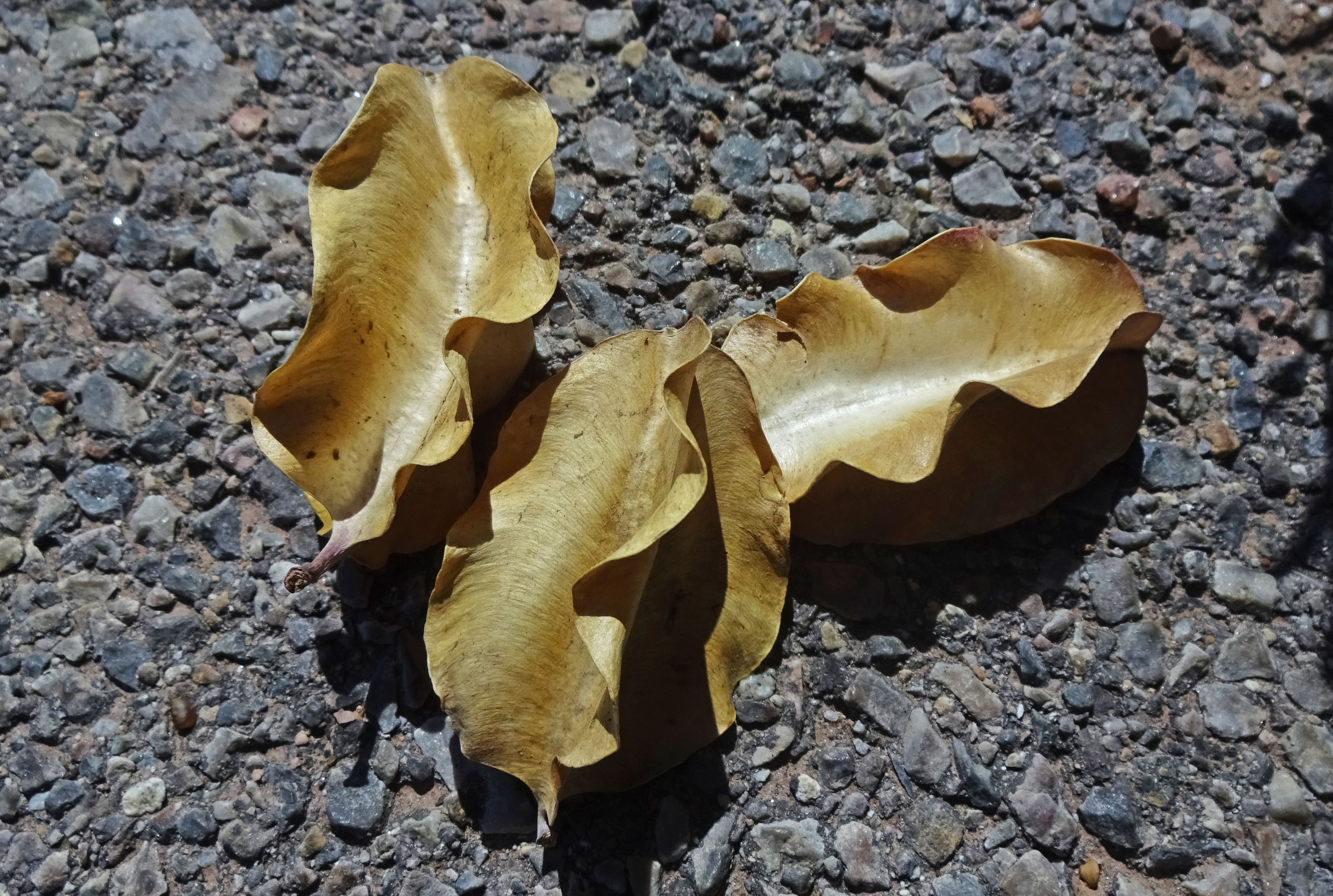
Fruit

== Etymology ==
The genus name Oenothera is from the Greek for "wine-scented". The specific epithet macrocarpa is also from the Greek, meaning "large fruited".

== Distribution and habitat ==
Oenothera macrocarpa is native to Arkansas, Illinois, Kansas, Missouri, Nebraska, Oklahoma, Tennessee, Texas, and northeast Mexico. Habitats include limestone outcrops, glades, bluffs, rocky prairies, quarries, and roadsides.

== Ecology ==
The flowers are pollinated by night-flying moths, such as sphinx moths (Sphingidae).

== Uses ==
The seed pods are often used in flower arrangements. This plant is also grown in gardens for its flowers. It is suitable as a groundcover in poor, stony soil which does not become waterlogged in winter, in full sun. It has gained the Royal Horticultural Society's Award of Garden Merit.
