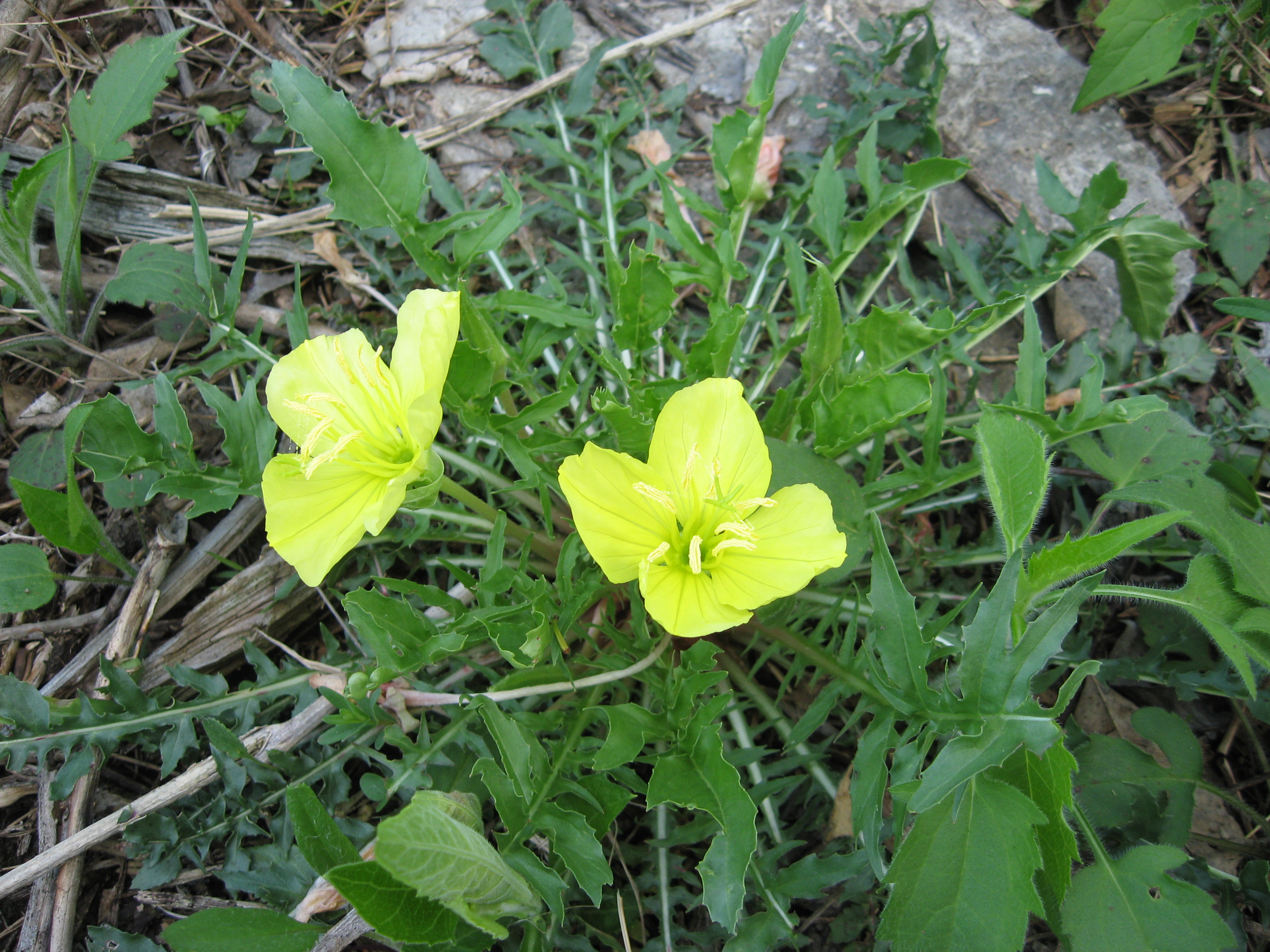

Conservation status
- Apparently Secure (NatureServe)

Scientific classification
- Kingdom: Plantae
- Clade: Tracheophytes
- Clade: Angiosperms
- Clade: Eudicots
- Clade: Rosids
- Order: Myrtales
- Family: Onagraceae
- Genus: Oenothera
- Species: O. triloba

Binomial name
- Oenothera triloba Nutt.

Synonyms
- Lavauxia nuttalliana; Lavauxia triloba; Lavauxia watsonii; Oenothera rhizocarpa; Oenothera roemeriana

= Oenothera triloba =

Plant species in the evening primrose family

Oenothera triloba, with common names stemless evening primrose and sessile evening primrose is a flowering plant in the primrose family. It is native to North America, where it is primarily found in northern Mexico and in the south-central United States. It is found in dry, open areas such as glades, prairies, and sometimes even lawns. It appears to respond positively to soil disturbance.

It is a winter annual that produces large yellow flowers in the spring. The flowers open near sunset.

== Taxonomy ==
Oenothera triloba was scientifically described and named by Thomas Nuttall in 1821. It is classified in the genus Oenothera as part of the family Onagraceae. According to Plants of the World Online it has no accepted varieties, but it has 8 synonyms including five species and three varieties.

Table of Synonyms
Name	Year	Rank	Notes
Lavauxia nuttalliana Spach	1835	species	= het.
Lavauxia triloba (Nutt.) Bartl.	1837	species	≡ hom.
Lavauxia triloba var. watsonii Britton	1894	variety	= het.
Lavauxia watsonii Small	1903	species	= het.
Oenothera rhizocarpa Spreng.	1825	species	= het.
Oenothera roemeriana Scheele	1849	species	= het.
Oenothera triloba var. parviflora S.Watson	1877	variety	= het.
Oenothera triloba var. watsonii (Britton) F.C.Gates	1939	variety	= het.
Notes: ≡ homotypic synonym; = heterotypic synonym

== Uses ==
Among the Zuni people, the plant is used as an ingredient of "schumaakwe cakes" and used externally for rheumatism and swelling. They also grind the roots and use them as food.
