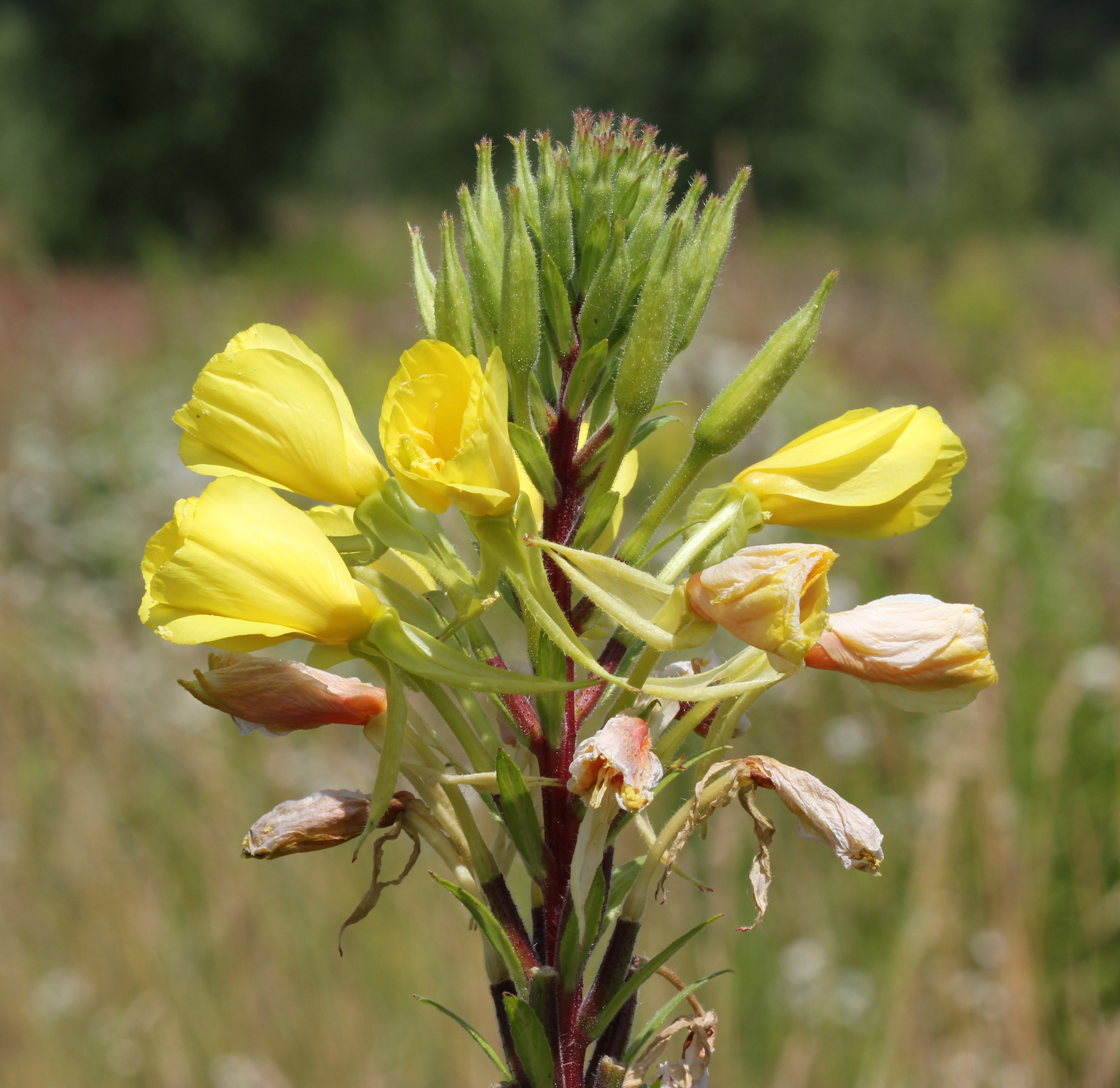
- Oenothera biennis

Scientific classification
- Kingdom: Plantae
- Clade: Embryophytes
- Clade: Tracheophytes
- Clade: Angiosperms
- Clade: Eudicots
- Clade: Rosids
- Order: Myrtales
- Family: Onagraceae
- Subfamily: Onagroideae
- Tribe: Onagreae
- Genus: Oenothera; L.

Species
- Around 160 species, including: List: O. acaulis Cav. O. acutissima W.L.Wagner O. affinis Cambess. O. albicaulis Pursh O. anomala Curtis O. arequipensis Munz & I.M.Johnst. O. argillicola Mack. O. arida W.L.Wagner & Hoch O. arizonica (Munz) W.L.Wagner O. avita (W.M.Klein) W.E.Klein O. bahia-blancae W.Dietr. O. biennis L. O. boquillensis (P.H.Raven & D.P.Greg.) W.L.Wagner & Hoch O. brachycarpa A.Gray O. brandegeei (Munz) P.H.Raven O. breedlovei W.Dietr. & W.L.Wagner O. brevipetala W.Dietr. O. calcicola (P.H.Raven & D.P.Greg.) W.L.Wagner & Hoch O. canescens Torr. & Frém. O. capillifolia Scheele O. catharinensis Cambess. O. cavernae Munz O. centaureifolia (Spach) Steud. O. cespitosa Nutt. O. cinerea (Wooton & Standl.) W.L.Wagner & Hoch O. clelandii W.Dietr., P.H.Raven & W.L.Wagner O. coloradensis (Rydb.) W.L.Wagner & Hoch O. coquimbensis Gay O. cordata J.W.Loudon O. coronopifolia Torr. & A.Gray O. coryi W.L.Wagner O. curtiflora W.L.Wagner & Hoch O. curtissii Small O. deltoides Torr. & Frém. O. demareei (P.H.Raven & D.P.Greg.) W.L.Wagner & Hoch O. deserticola (Loes.) Munz O. dissecta A.Gray ex S.Watson O. dodgeniana Krakos & W.L.Wagner O. drummondii Hook. O. elata Kunth O. elongata Rusby O. engelmannii (Small) Munz O. epilobiifolia Kunth O. falfurriae W.Dietr. & W.L.Wagner O. featherstonei Munz & I.M.Johnst. O. filiformis (Small) W.L.Wagner & Hoch O. filipes (Spach) W.L.Wagner & Hoch O. flava (A.Nelson) Garrett O. fruticosa L. O. gaura W.L.Wagner & Hoch O. gayleana B.L.Turner & M.J.Moore O. glaucifolia W.L.Wagner & Hoch O. glazioviana Micheli O. grandiflora L'Hér. O. grandis Smyth O. grisea W.Dietr. O. harringtonii W.L.Wagner, Stockh. & W.M.Klein O. hartwegii Benth. O. havardii S.Watson O. heterophylla Spach O. hexandra (Ortega) W.L.Wagner & Hoch O. hispida (Benth.) W.L.Wagner, Hoch & Zarucchi O. howardii (A.Nelson) M.E.Jones ex Prain O. humifusa Nutt. O. indecora Cambess. O. jamesii Torr. & A.Gray O. kunthiana (Spach) Munz O. laciniata Hill O. lavandulifolia Torr. & A.Gray O. lasiocarpa Griseb. O. lindheimeri (Engelm. & A.Gray) W.L.Wagner & Hoch O. linifolia Nutt. O. longiflora L. O. longissima Rydb. O. longituba W.Dietr. O. luciae-julianiae W.L.Wagner O. macrocarpa Nutt. O. macrosceles A.Gray O. magellanica Phil. O. maysillesii Munz O. mckelveyae (Munz) W.L.Wagner & Hoch O. mendocinensis Gillies ex Hook. & Arn. O. mexicana Spach O. mollissima L. O. montevidensis W.Dietr. O. muelleri Munz O. multicaulis Ruiz & Pav. O. nana Griseb. O. nealleyi (J.M.Coult.) Krakos & W.L.Wagner O. neomexicana (Small) Munz O. nocturna Jacq. O. nutans G.F.Atk. & Bartlett O. nuttallii Torr. & A.Gray O. oakesiana (A.Gray) J.W.Robbins ex S.Watson O. odorata Jacq. O. organensis Munz ex S.Emers. O. orizabae W.L.Wagner O. pallida Lindl. O. parodiana Munz O. parviflora L. O. pedunculifolia W.Dietr. O. patriciae W.L.Wagner & Hoch O. pedunculifolia W.Dietr. O. pennellii Munz O. perennis L. O. peruana W.Dietr. O. picensis Phil. O. pilosella Raf. O. platanorum P.H.Raven & D.R.Parn. O. podocarpa (Wooton & Standl.) Krakos & W.L.Wagner O. primiveris A.Gray O. psammophila (A.Nelson & J.F.Macbr.) W.L.Wagner, Stockh. & W.M.Klein O. pseudoelongata W.Dietr. O. pubescens Willd. ex Spreng. O. punae Kuntze O. ravenii W.Dietr. O. recurva W.Dietr. O. resicum Benavides, Kuethe, Ortiz-Alcaráz & León de la Luz O. rhombipetala Nutt. O. riparia Nutt. O. riskindii W.L.Wagner O. rivadaviae W.Dietr. O. rosea L'Hér. ex Aiton O. sandiana Hassk. O. santarii W.Dietr. O. scabra K.Krause O. seifrizii Munz O. serrulata Nutt. O. sessilis (Pennell) Munz O. siambonensis W.Dietr. O. simulans (Small) W.L.Wagner & Hoch O. sinuosa W.L.Wagner & Hoch O. spachiana Torr. & A.Gray O. speciosa Nutt. O. stricta Ledeb. ex Link O. stubbei W.Dietr., P.H.Raven & W.L.Wagner O. suffrutescens (Moc. & Sessé ex Ser.) W.L.Wagner & Hoch O. suffulta (Engelm.) W.L.Wagner & Hoch O. tafiensis W.Dietr. O. tamrae W.Dietr. & W.L.Wagner O. tarijensis W.Dietr. O. tetragona Roth O. tetraptera Cav. O. texensis P.H.Raven & D.R.Parn. O. toumeyi (Small) Tidestr. O. triangulata (Buckley) W.L.Wagner & Hoch O. triloba Nutt. O. tubicula A.Gray O. tubifera Ser. O. tucumanensis W.Dietr. O. verrucosa I.M.Johnst. O. versicolor Lehm. O. villaricae W.Dietr. O. villosa Thunb. O. wigginsii W.M.Klein O. wolfii (Munz) P.H.Raven, W.Dietr. & Stubbe O. xylocarpa Coville List sources : See: List of Oenothera species.

= Oenothera =

Genus of plants

Oenothera (Note: /ˌiːnəˈθɪərə, ˌiːnoʊ-, iːˈnɒθ(ə)rə/ EE-nə-THEE-rə, EE-no-, ee-NOTH-ə-rə) is a genus of about 160 species of herbaceous flowering plants native to the Americas. The genus includes the plants known as common evening primrose, narrow-leaved sundrops and white gaura. It is the type genus of the family Onagraceae. They are not closely related to the true primroses (genus Primula).

== Description ==
The species vary in size from small alpine plants 10 centimeters tall, such as O. acaulis from Chile, to vigorous lowland species growing to around 3 meters talls, such as O. stubbei from Mexico. The leaves form a basal rosette at ground level and spiral up to the flowering stems. The blades are dentate or deeply lobed (pinnatifid). The flowers of many species open in the evening, hence the name "evening primrose". They may open in under a minute. Most species have yellow flowers, but some have white, purple, pink, or red. Most native desert species are white. Oenothera cespitosa, a species of western North America, produces white flowers that turn pink with age. One of the most distinctive features of the flower is the stigma, which has four branches in an X shape.

== Ecology ==
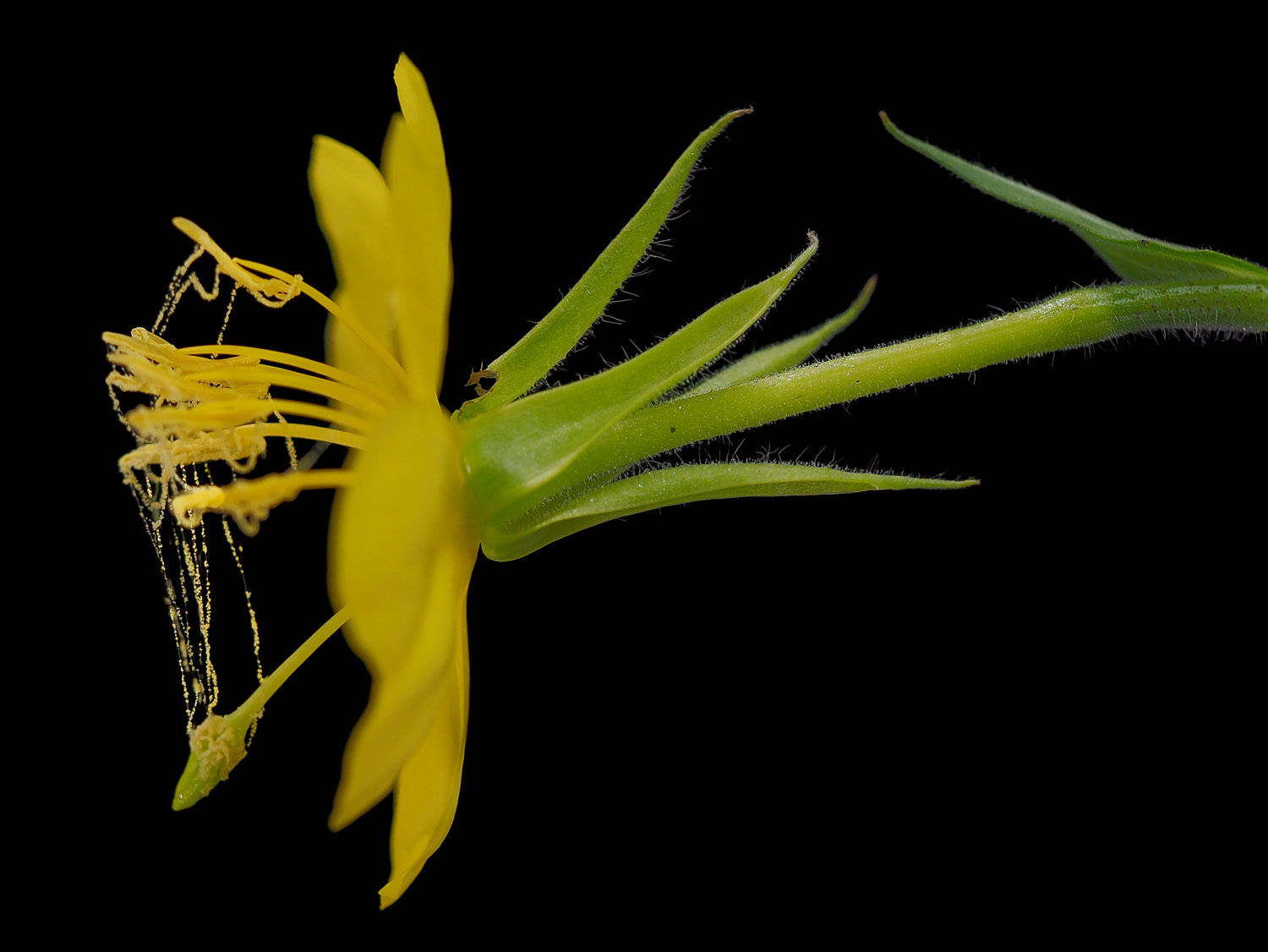
Evening primrose

Oenothera flowers are pollinated by insects, such as moths and bees. Like many other members of the Onagraceae, however, the pollen grains are loosely held together by viscin threads, so only insects that are morphologically specialized to gather this pollen can effectively pollinate the flowers. Bees with typical scopa cannot hold it. Also, the flowers open at a time when most bee species are inactive, so the bees which visit Oenothera are generally vespertine temporal specialists: bees that forage in the evening. The seeds ripen from late summer to fall.

Oenothera are used as food plants by the larvae of some Lepidoptera species, including the large white-lined sphinx (Hyles lineata). The flower moths Schinia felicitata and S. florida both feed exclusively on the genus, and the former is limited to O. deltoides.

In the wild, some species of evening primrose act as primary colonizers, quickly appearing in recently cleared areas. They germinate in disturbed soils, and can be found in habitat types such as dunes, roadsides, railway embankments, and waste areas. They are often casual and are eventually out competed by other species.

Based on observations of evening primroses (O. drummondii), a study discovered that within minutes of sensing the sound waves of nearby bee wings through flower petals, the concentration of the sugar in the plant's nectar was increased by an average of 20 percent. Experiments were also conducted on flowers with the petals removed. No change in nectar production was noted, indicating that it is indeed the petals that sense sound.

== Origin ==
The genus Oenothera may have originated in Mexico and Central America, and spread farther north in North America and into South America. With the advent of international travel, species are now found in most temperate regions of the world. In Europe alone there are about 70 introduced species of Oenothera. During the Pleistocene era a succession of ice ages swept down across North America, with intervening warm periods. This occurred four times, and the genus experienced four separate waves of colonization, each hybridizing with the survivors of previous waves. This formed the present-day subsection Euoenothera. The group is genetically and morphologically diverse and the species are largely interfertile, so the species boundaries have been disputed amongst taxonomists.

== Genetics ==
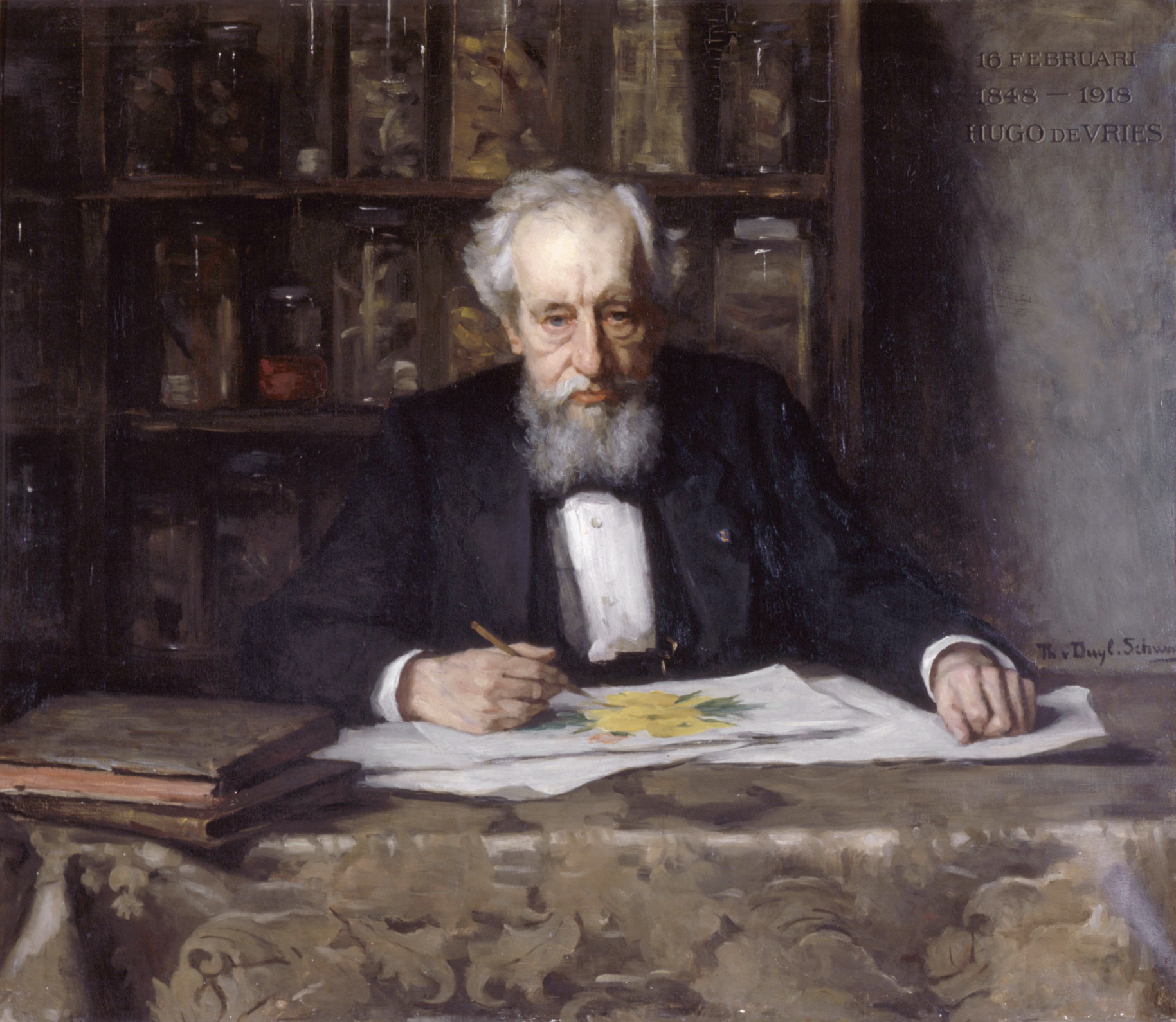
Painting of Hugo de Vries, making a painting of an evening primrose, which had apparently produced new forms by large mutations in his experiments, by Thérèse Schwartze, 1918

The pattern of repeated colonizations resulted in a unique genetic conformation in the Euoenothera whereby the chromosomes at meiosis can form circles rather than pairs. This is the result of several reciprocal translocations between chromosomes such that the pairing occurs only at the tips. This phenomenon apparently has non-Mendelian genetic consequences; with this mode of chromosome segregation and a system of balanced-lethal genes, genetic recombination is prevented and the plants display the hybrid vigor of heterosis. This resulted in the evolution of many sympatric races in North America east of the Rocky Mountains. Analysis of the cytology of these races and of artificial hybrids between them increased understanding of the genetic and geographic evolution of the Euoenothera. This subject was a major area of genetic research during the first half of the 20th century.

The appearance of sudden changes in Oenothera lamarckiana led the pioneering geneticist Hugo de Vries to propose what he called "mutation theory" in 1901 (Mutationstheorie in the German the original article was written in). This asserted that speciation was driven by sudden large mutations able to produce new varieties in a single step. The understanding that the observed changes in hybrids of the plant were caused by chromosome duplications (polyploidy) rather than gene mutation did not come until much later.

== Taxonomy ==
Evening primroses were originally assigned to the genus Onagra, which gave the family Onagraceae its name. Onagra '[food of] onager' was first used in botany in 1587, and in English in Philip Miller's 1754 Gardeners Dictionary: Abridged. The modern name Oenothera was published by Carolus Linnaeus in his Systema Naturae. Its etymology is uncertain, but it is believed to be derived from the Greek words ὄνος (ónos, 'ass') or οἶνος (oînos, 'wine') and θήρᾱ (thḗrā, 'hunt'), with the meaning 'ass-catcher' or 'wine-seeking'.

The genus is divided into 18 sections and additionally into several subsections and series.

=== Names ===
The first species called by the common name evening primrose was Oenothera biennis from eastern North America with the first use recorded by the Oxford English Dictionary dating to 1761 in The Calendar of Flora, Swedish and English by Benjamin Stillingfleet. Though there are stories of uncertain veracity that attribute the coinage to the botanist John Goodyer in the 1600s. Older common names included tree primrose and night primrose. Species that open in the morning rather than the evening are often called sundrops, though most often in the United States. This name was first used in print in 1785.

== Dietary uses and side effects ==
Certain Oenothera plants have edible parts. The roots of O. biennis are reportedly edible in young plants. So are the flowers which have a sweet, crunchy taste.

The common evening primrose, O. biennis, is commonly sold as a dietary supplement in capsules containing the seed oil. The main phytochemical in this evening primrose seed oil is gamma-linolenic acid.

There is no high-quality scientific evidence that O. biennis or evening primrose oil has any effect on human diseases or promotion of health, and specifically no evidence that it is effective to treat atopic dermatitis or cancer. Research indicates that orally-administered evening primrose oil does not relieve symptoms of premenstrual syndrome, and does not have an effect on shortening the length of pregnancy or labor.

Consuming evening primrose oil may cause headache or stomach upset, may increase the risk of complications during pregnancy, and may increase the risk of bleeding in people given prescription drugs as anticoagulants, such as warfarin.

== Cultivation ==
A number of perennial members of the genus are commonly cultivated and used in landscaping in the southwestern United States. Popular species include tufted evening primrose (Oenothera cespitosa), Mexican evening primrose (Oenothera berlandieri), and Saltillo evening primrose (Oenothera stubbei).

Annual evening primroses are also popular ornamental plants in gardens. Many are fairly drought-resistant.

The first plants to arrive in Europe reached Padua from Virginia in 1614 and were described by the English botanist John Goodyer in 1621. Some species are now also naturalized in parts of Europe and Asia, and can be grown as far north as 65°N in Finland. The UK National Council for the Conservation of Plants and Gardens, based at Wisley, maintains an Oenothera collection as part of its National Collections scheme.

== Gallery ==
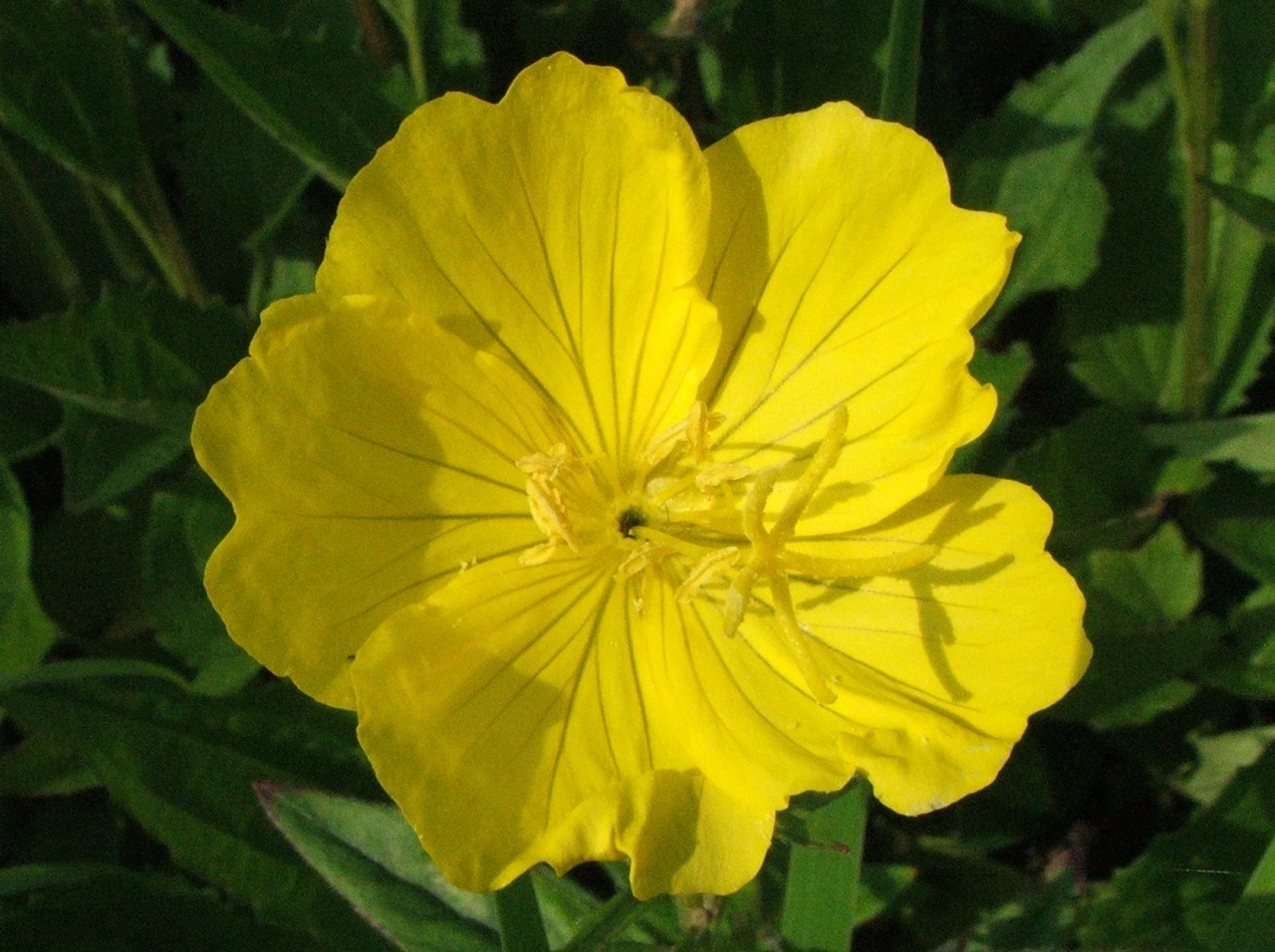
Oenothera macrocarpa

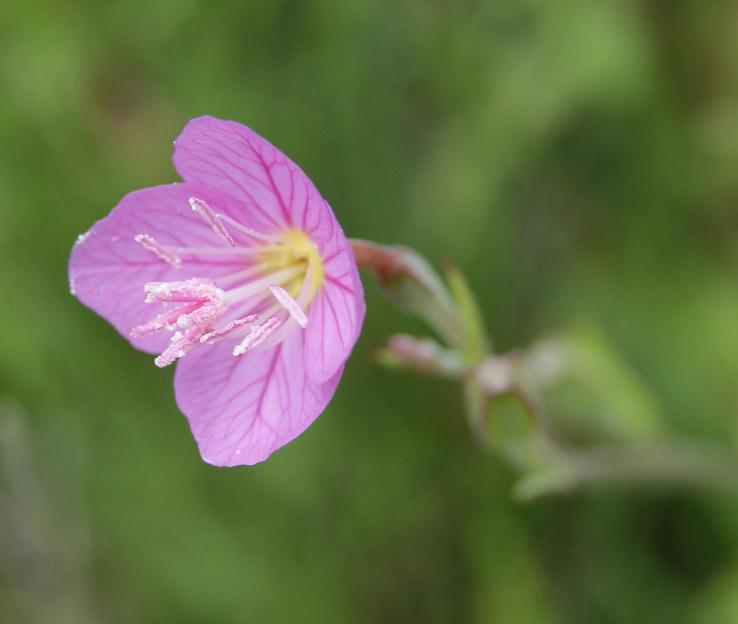
Oenothera rosea

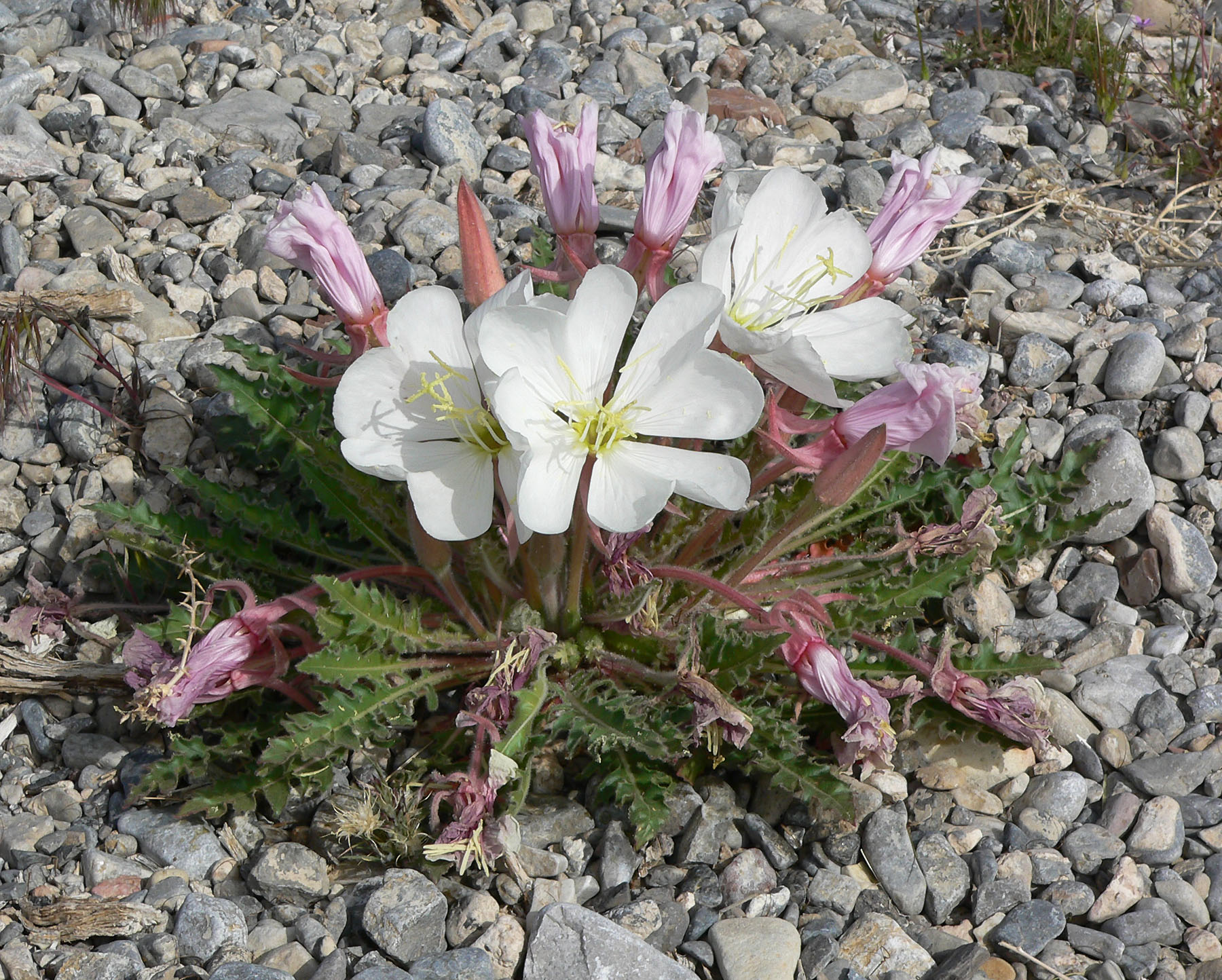
Oenothera cespitosa subsp. marginata

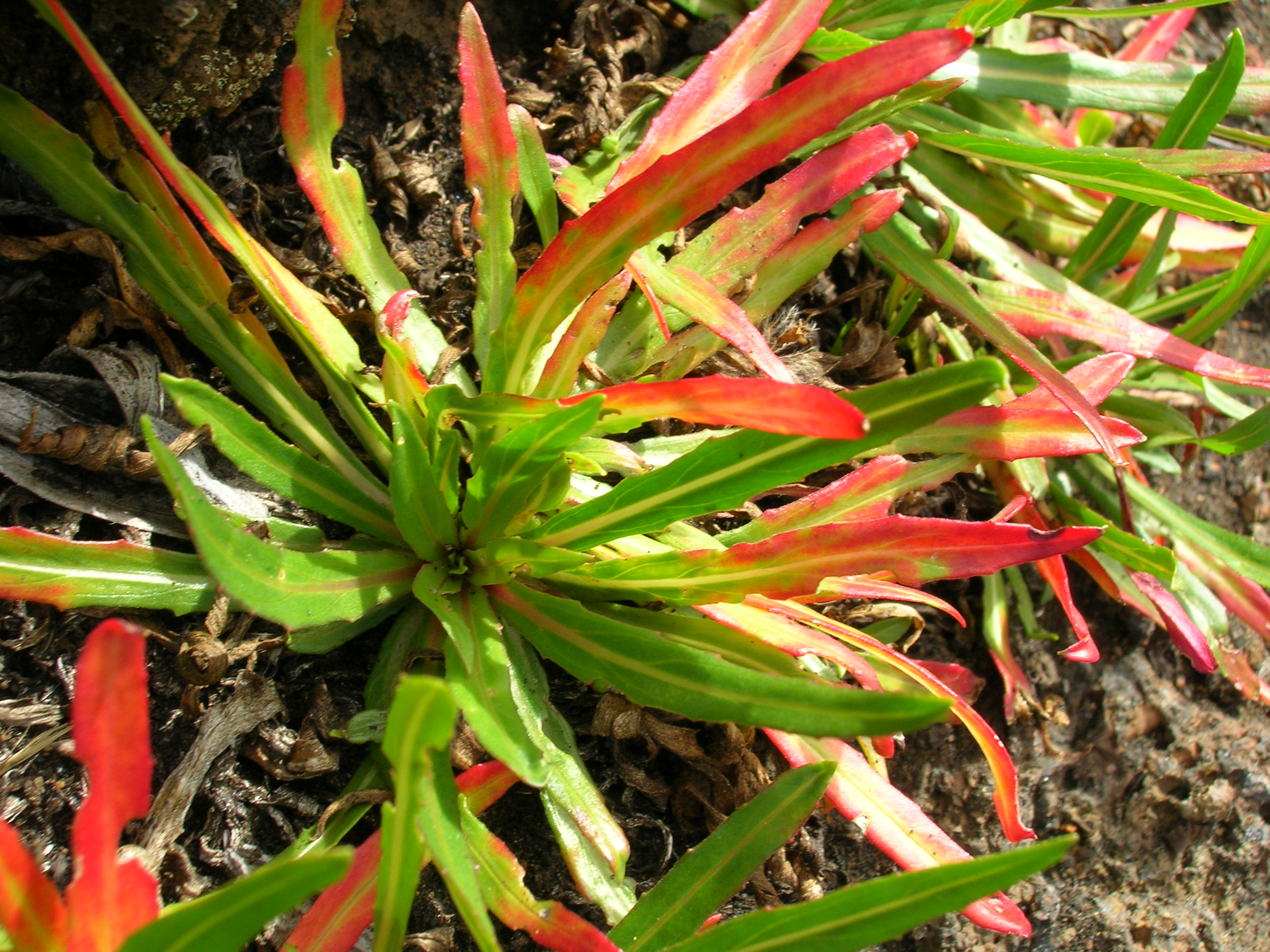
Oenothera stricta ssp. stricta

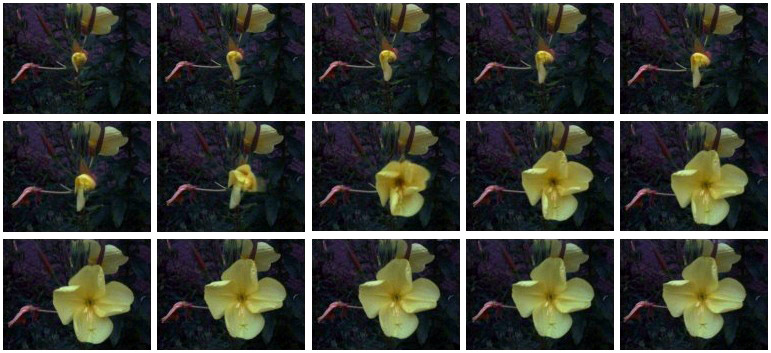
Oenothera sp. opening

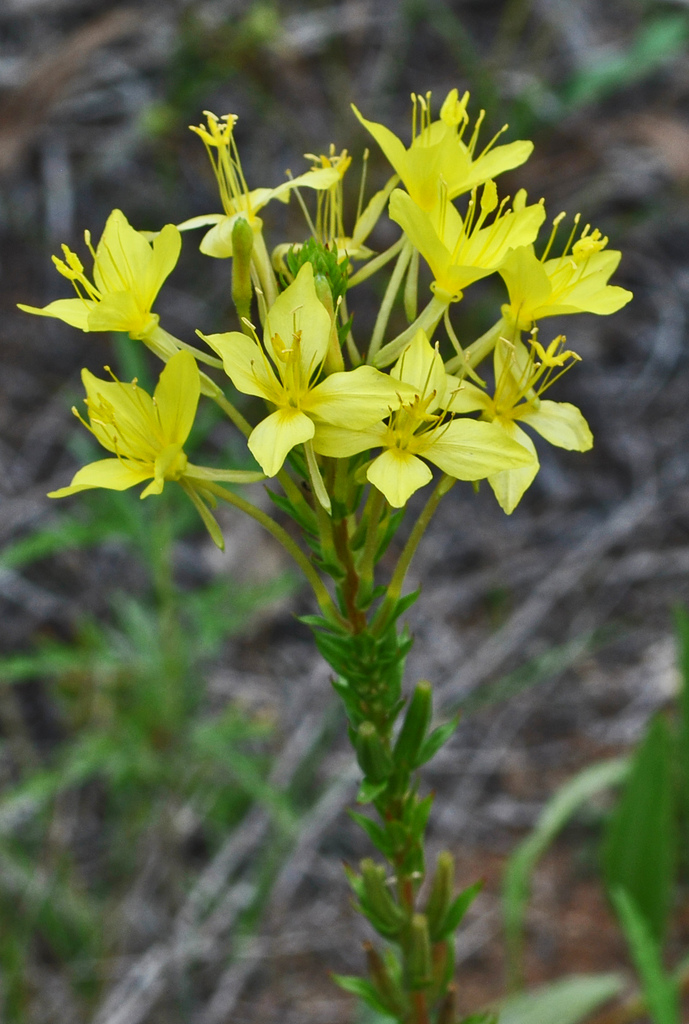
Oenothera clelandii

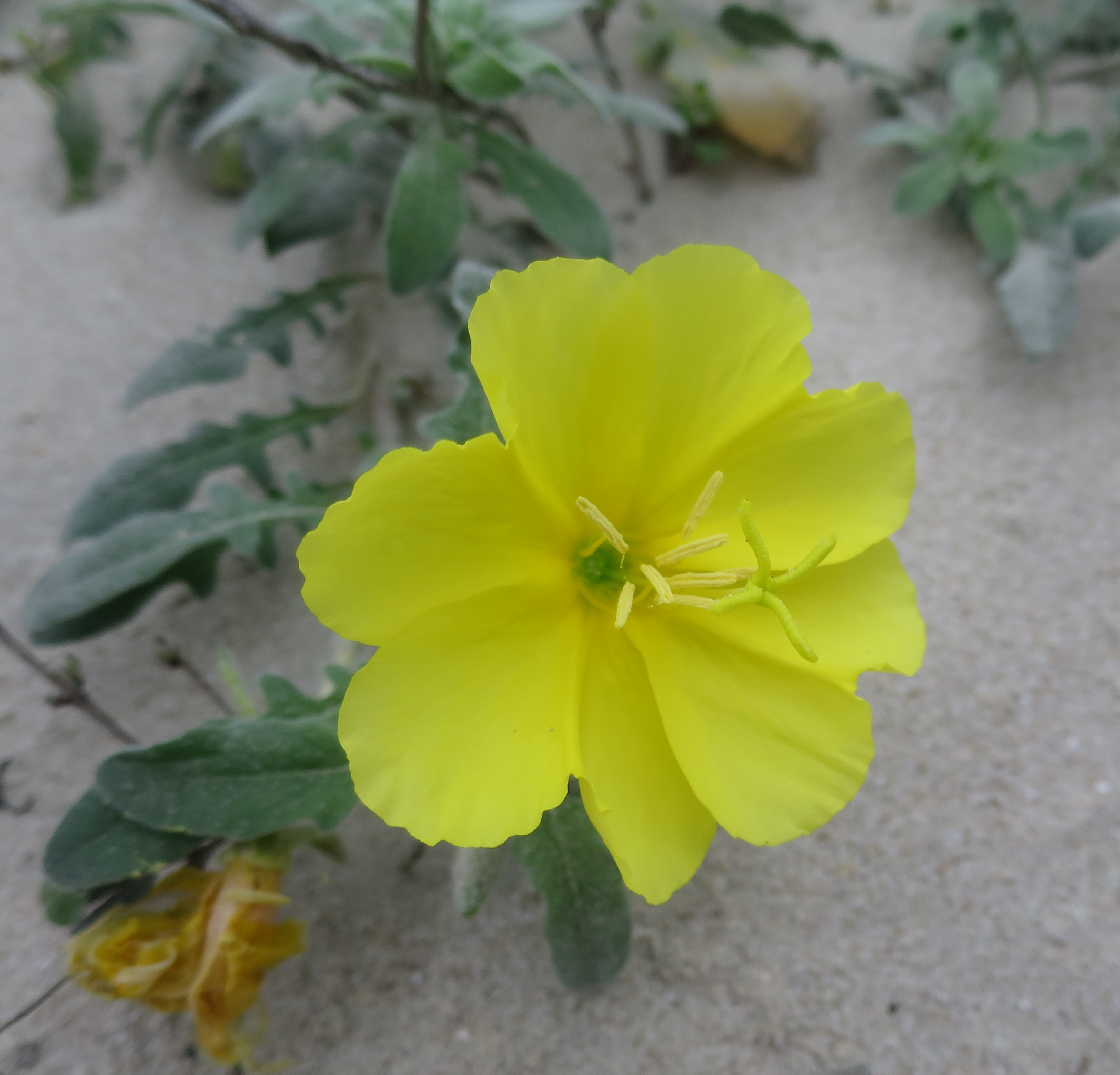
Oenothera drummondii

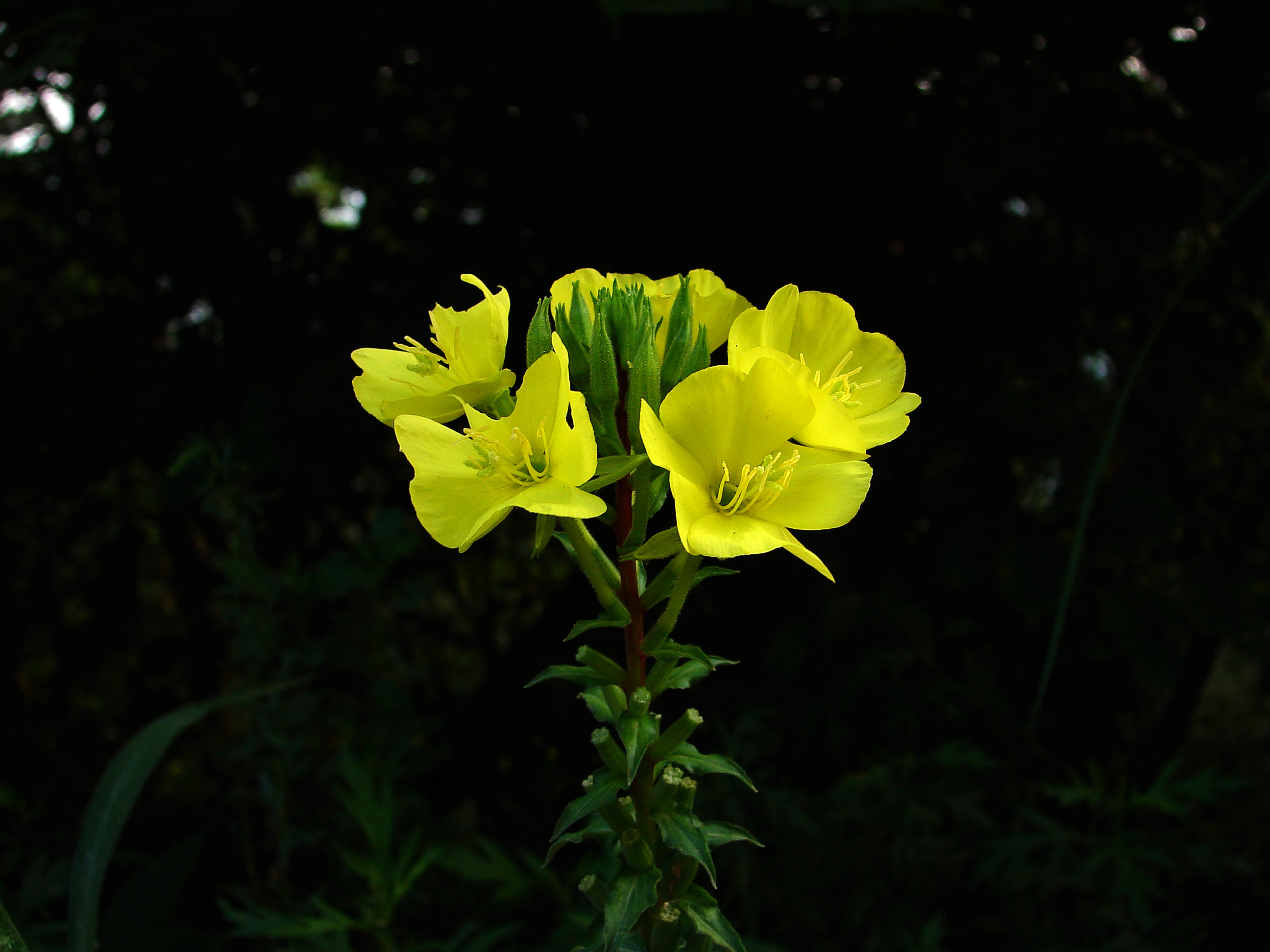
Oenothera odorata

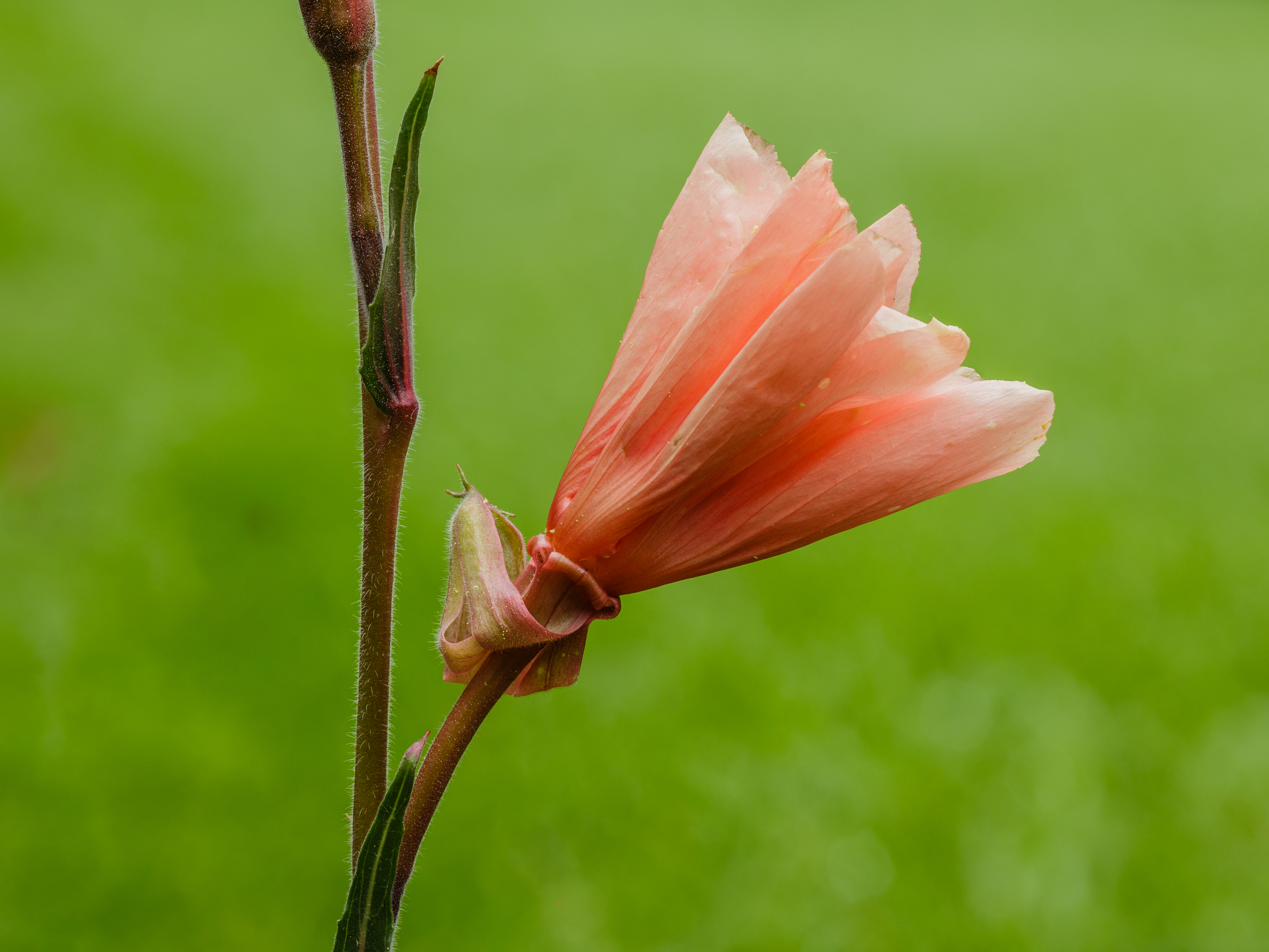
Closed flower.
