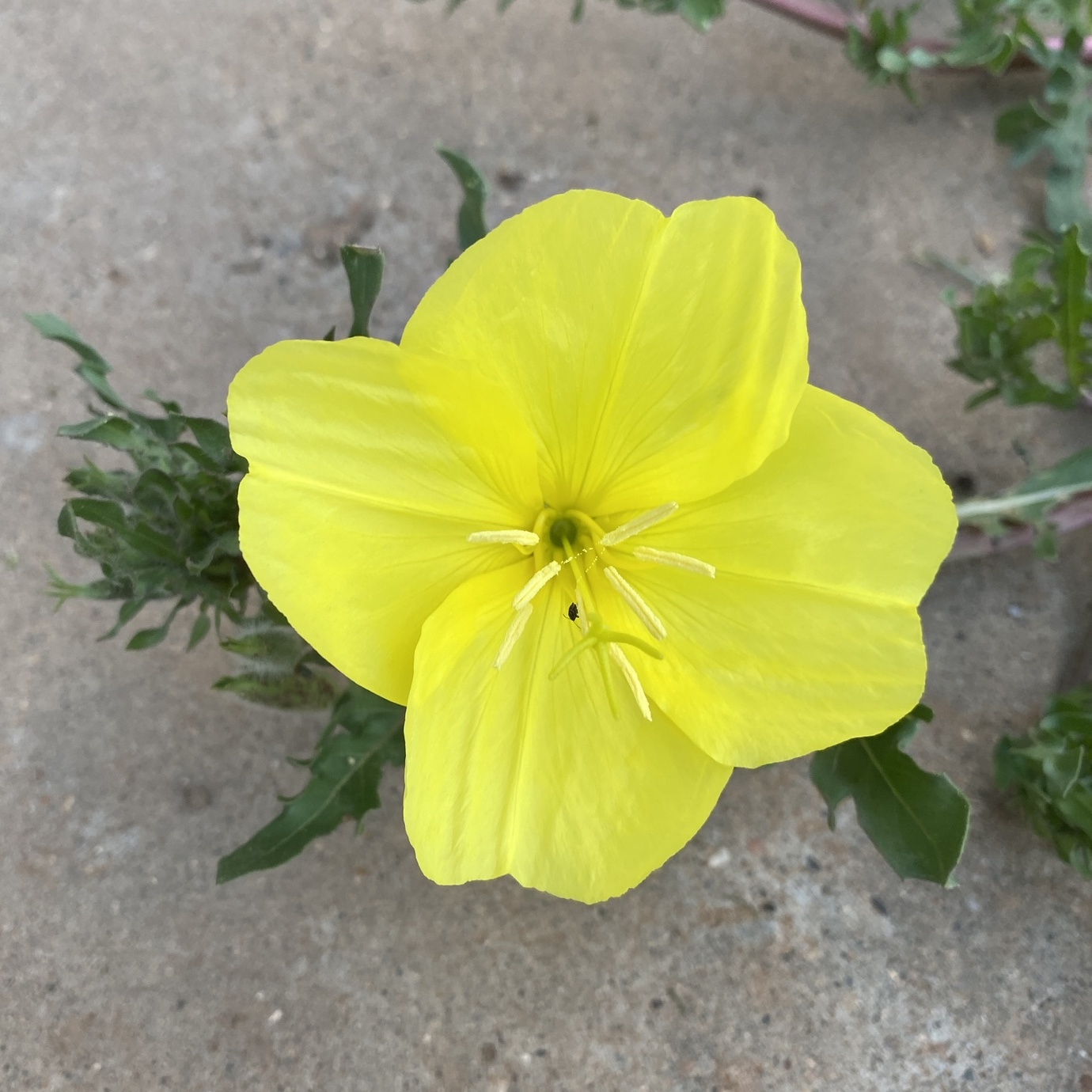

Scientific classification
- Kingdom: Plantae
- Clade: Tracheophytes
- Clade: Angiosperms
- Clade: Eudicots
- Clade: Rosids
- Order: Myrtales
- Family: Onagraceae
- Genus: Oenothera
- Species: O. grandis

Binomial name
- Oenothera grandis Smyth

Synonyms
- Raimannia grandis

= Oenothera grandis =

Plant species in the evening primrose family

Oenothera grandis, variously showy ragged evening-primrose, grand evening primrose, or large-flowered cut-leaved evening primrose, is an annual plant that is native to the southern Great Plains and parts of Mexico.

== Description ==
Showy ragged evening-primrose is an annual plant that grows a narrow taproot. It will sometimes behave as a winter annual, sprouting late in the year and blooming in the next spring or summer, though late summer seedlings can bloom by late September or October. It has stems that grow straight upward or lean out somewhat from the base of the plant before growing upwards that are typically 15 to 60 centimeters (6–24 in) tall, but occasionally can grow to as much as one meter (3.3 ft) in length. The stems often have branches that also grow upward, if a plant has branches near the base they often grow along the ground. All stems are covered with sparse hairs that point in the same direction and are glandular towards the top of the stems.

Young plants have a rosette of basal leaves. All the leaves are oblanceolate to narrowly elliptic with lobed or dentate, coarsely toothed, edges and when lobed the lobes are often dentate. The basal leaves are 5–13 cm (2.0–5.1 in) long and 1–3 cm (0.4–1.2 in) wide while leaves attached to stems are 3–10 cm (1.2–3.9 in) long and 1.5–3.5 cm (0.6–1.4 in) wide.

Its flowers have yellow petals that become somewhat pink as they fade and are 2 to 4 centimeters (0.8–1.6 in), though more typically 2.5–3.5 cm. They are found above each leaf. One to a few flowers open each day near sunset and plants can bloom anytime from March to September in its native habitat.

The fruit is a cylindrical capsule 2.5 to 5 cm (1–2 in) long and just 2 to 3 mm wide. The seeds are somewhat egg shaped and 0.9–1.2 mm and yellowish-brown.

== Taxonomy ==
Oenothera grandis was scientifically described and named in 1899 by Bernard Bryan Smyth. It is part of the genus Oenothera and classified in the Onagraceae family. It has no accepted subspecies but does have six homotypic synonyms.

Table of Synonyms
Name	Year	Rank	Notes
Oenothera laciniata var. grandiflora (S.Watson) B.L.Rob.	1908	variety	
Oenothera laciniata var. grandis Britton	1897	variety	nom. illeg., nom. superfl.
Oenothera laciniata var. occidentalis Small	1896	variety	nom. illeg.
Oenothera sinuata var. grandiflora S.Watson	1873	variety	
Oenothera sinuata var. grandis Britton	1894	variety	nom. illeg., nom. superfl.
Raimannia grandis (Smyth) Rose ex Sprague & L.Riley	1921	species	

=== Names ===
Oenothera grandis is known by the common names showy ragged evening-primrose, grand evening primrose, or large-flowered cut-leaved evening primrose. It is also known as showy evening primrose by sources such as the Natural Resources Conservation Service, however Oenothera speciosa is frequently known by this name.

== Range and habitat ==
Showy ragged evening-primrose is native from Nebraska, Colorado, and Missouri southwards in the United States and to northeastern and southwestern Mexico. The many reports in states east of the Mississippi are likely recent introductions. In Mexico it is known from just three scattered states, Durango and Tamaulipas in the north and Michoacán in the south.

== Ecology ==
Both white-tailed deer and cattle will consume the leaves. Seeds are eaten by white-winged doves and mourning doves.
