= List of Oenothera species =

Subdivisions of the genus Oenothera in the Onagraceae (evening primrose) family:

== Section Anogra ==
Oenothera sect. Angora (Spach) W.L.Wagner & Hoch – western North America in dry, sandy soils in deserts, grasslands, and forest openings, up to 2000 m. elevation.

- Oenothera arizonica (Munz) W.L.Wagner – California evening primrose (Arizona & Mexico)
- Oenothera avita (W.M.Klein) W.E.Klein – California evening primrose
  - O. avita ssp. avita
  - O. avita ssp. californica (S.Watson) W.L.Wagner & Gandhi
  - O. avita ssp. eurekensis (Munz & J.C.Roos) W.E.Klein – Eureka Dunes evening primrose
- Oenothera deltoides Torr. & Frém. – birdcage evening primrose
  - O. deltoides ssp. ambigua (Munz) W.M.Klein
  - O. deltoides ssp. cognata (Jeps.) W.M.Klein
  - O. deltoides ssp. deltoides
  - O. deltoides ssp. howellii (Munz) W.M.Klein - Antioch Dunes evening primrose
  - O. deltoides ssp. piperi (Munz) W.M.Klein
- Oenothera engelmannii (Small) Munz – Engelmann's evening primrose (south-central U.S.)
- Oenothera neomexicana (Small) Munz – New Mexico evening primrose (Arizona, New Mexico)
- Oenothera nuttallii Sweet – Nuttall's evening primrose (central North America)
- Oenothera pallida Lindl. – pale evening primrose, white buttercup (western North America)
  - O. pallida ssp. gypsophila (Eastw.) Munz & W.M.Klein – whitepole evening primrose
  - O. pallida ssp. pallida
  - O. pallida ssp. runcinata (Engelm.) Munz & W.M.Klein
  - O. pallida ssp. trichocalyx (Nutt.) Munz & W.M.Klein
- Oenothera wigginsii W.M.Klein – (Baja California in Mexico)

== Section Calylophus ==
Oenothera sect. Calylophus (Spach) W. L. Wagner & Hoch – in North American Great Plains and south to central Mexico.

=== subsect. Calylophus ===
- Oenothera berlandieri (Spach) Steud. – Mexican evening primrose
  - O. berlandieri ssp. berlandieri
  - O. berlandieri ssp. pinifolia (Engelm.) W. L. Wagner & Hoch
- Oenothera serrulata Nutt. – yellow sundrops

=== subsect. Salpingia ===
- Oenothera hartwegii Benth. – Hartweg's sundrops
  - O. hartwegii ssp. fendleri (A.Gray) W.L.Wagner & Hoch
  - O. hartwegii ssp. filifolia (Eastw.) W.L.Wagner & Hoch
  - O. hartwegii ssp. hartwegii
  - O. hartwegii ssp. maccartii (Shinners) W.L.Wagner & Hoch
  - O. hartwegii ssp. pubescens (A.Gray) W.L.Wagner & Hoch
- Oenothera lavandulifolia Torr. & A.Gray – lavenderleaf sundrops
- Oenothera toumeyi (A.Gray) Tidestr. – Toumey's sundrops
- Oenothera tubicula A.Gray – Texas sundrops
  - O. tubicula ssp. strigulosa (Towner) W.L.Wagner & Hoch
  - O. tubicula ssp. tubicula

== Section Contortae ==
Oenothera sect. Contortae W.L.Wagner – Sierra Nevadas of California, extending just into western Nevada.

- Oenothera xylocarpa Coville – woodyfruit evening primrose

== Section Eremia ==
Oenothera sect. Eremia W.L.Wagner – western North America, with a distribution in the Chihuahuan, Mojave, and Sonoran deserts.

- Oenothera primiveris A.Gray – desert evening primrose
  - O. primiveris ssp. bufonis (M.E. Jones) Munz – large yellow desert primrose
  - O. primiveris ssp. primiveris

== Section Gaura ==
Oenothera sect. Gaura (L.) W.L.Wagner & Hoch – beeblossom (includes most of the taxa formerly placed in genus Gaura)

=== subsect. Campogaura ===
- Oenothera boquillensis (P.H.Raven & D.P.Greg.) W.L.Wagner & Hoch – Rio Grande beeblossom (Texas & Mexico)
- Oenothera suffrutescens (Ser.) W.L.Wagner & Hoch – scarlet beeblossom (western North America)

=== subsect. Gaura ===
- Oenothera coloradensis (Rydb.) W.L.Wagner & Hoch (Nebraska, Wyoming, Colorado, New Mexico)
  - O. coloradensis ssp. coloradensis – Colorado beeblossom or butterfly plant
  - O. coloradensis ssp. neomexicana (Wooton) W.L.Wagner & Hoch – New Mexico beeblossom
- Oenothera demareei (P.H.Raven & D.P.Greg.) W.L.Wagner & Hoch – Demaree's beeblossom
- Oenothera filiformis (Small) W.L.Wagner & Hoch – biennial gaura
- Oenothera gaura W.L.Wagner & Hoch – (eastern North America, from Ontario to South Carolina and Minnesota to Missouri)
- Oenothera hexandra (Ortega) W.L.Wagner & Hoch
  - O. hexandra ssp. gracilis (Wooton & Standl.) W.L.Wagner & Hoch
  - O. hexandra ssp. hexandra
- Oenothera lindheimeri (Engelm. & A.Gray) W.L.Wagner & Hoch
- Oenothera patriciae W.L.Wagner & Hoch
- Oenothera simulans (Small) W.L.Wagner & Hoch
- Oenothera suffulta (Engelmann) W.L.Wagner & Hoch
  - O. suffulta ssp. suffulta
  - O. suffulta ssp. nealleyi (J. M. Coulter) W.L.Wagner & Hoch
- Oenothera triangulata (Buckley) W.L.Wagner & Hoch

=== subsect. Gauridium ===
- Oenothera anomala Curtis – anomalous Oenothera (Mexico)

=== subsect. Schizocarya ===
- Oenothera curtiflora W.L.Wagner & Hoch – lizard tail (North America)

=== subsect. Stenosiphon ===
- Oenothera glaucifolia W.L.Wagner & Hoch – false gaura (southern Great Plains of central North America)

=== subsect. Stipogaura ===
- Oenothera calcicola (P.H.Raven & D.P.Gregory) W.L.Wagner & Hoch
- Oenothera cinerea (Wooton & Standl.) W.L.Wagner & Hoch – gaura-pilosa
  - O. cinerea ssp. cinerea
  - O. cinerea ssp. parksii (Munz) W.L.Wagner & Hoch
- Oenothera filipes (Spach) W.L.Wagner & Hoch
- Oenothera mckelveyae (Munz) W.L.Wagner & Hoch
- Oenothera sinuosa W.L.Wagner & Hoch – wavy-leaf gaura

=== subsect. Xenogaura ===
- Oenothera xenogaura W.L.Wagner & Hoch – (southern North America)

=== subsect. Xerogaura ===
- Oenothera arida W.L.Wagner & Hoch – (Texas, Mexico)

== Section Gauropsis ==
Oenothera sect. Gauropsis (Torrey & Frémont) W.L.Wagner – Wyoming, western Nebraska, eastern Colorado, New Mexico, Kansas and the Texas Panhandle in the U.S. High Plains.

- Oenothera canescens Torr. & Frém. – spotted evening primrose

== Section Hartmannia ==
Oenothera sect. Hartmannia (Spach) W. L. Wagner & Hoch – Generally in Mexico, Arizona, and Texas. But O. speciosa extends into the U.S. Central Plains, and O. rosea extends to the Caribbean, and northern South America.

- Oenothera deserticola (Loes.) Munz – (Mexico)
- Oenothera platanorum P.H.Raven & D.R.Parn. – Fort Huachuca evening primrose
- Oenothera rosea L'Hér. ex Aiton – pink evening primrose, Rose of Mexico
- Oenothera speciosa Nutt. – showy evening primrose, Mexican primrose, amapola
- Oenothera texensis P.H.Raven & D.R.Parn. – Texas evening primrose

== Section Kleinia ==
Oenothera sect. Kleinia Munz – distributed over the Chihuahuan, Sonoran, and southern portions of the Great Basin deserts to the Great Plains, from southern Utah to southeastern Montana and western North Dakota, and northern Mexico.

- Oenothera albicaulis Pursh – prairie evening-primrose
- Oenothera coronopifolia Torr. & A.Gray

== Section Kneiffia ==
Oenothera sect. Kneiffia (Spach) Straley – eastern North America, at elevations up to 1900 m.

- Oenothera fruticosa L. – narrow-leaved or southern sundrops (eastern North America)
  - O. fruticosa ssp. fruticosa – (more southern distribution)
  - O. fruticosa ssp. glauca (Michx.) Straley – (more northern distribution)
- Oenothera perennis L. – little evening primrose, perennial sundrops (North America)
- Oenothera pilosella Raf. – prairie sundrops, meadow evening primrose
  - O. pilosella ssp. pilosella – (eastern North America)
  - O. pilosella ssp. sessilis (Pennell) Straley – (AR, LA, TX)
- Oenothera riparia Nutt. – riverbank sundrops
- Oenothera spachiana Torr. & A.Gray – Spach's evening-primrose (Alabama, Arkansas, Louisiana, Mississippi, Oklahoma, Texas)

== Section Lavauxia ==
Oenothera sect. Lavauxia (Spach) W. L. Wagner & Hoch – North and South America.

=== subsect. Australis ===
- Oenothera acaulis Cav. − (Chile)
- Oenothera centaurifolia (Spach) Steud. − (Uruguay, Brazil, Argentina)

=== subsect. Lavauxia ===
- Oenothera acutissima W.L.Wagner – Flaming Gorge evening primrose (Utah, Colorado)
- Oenothera flava (A. Nelson) Garrett – yellow evening primrose (west & central North America)
  - O. flava ssp. flava
  - O. flava ssp. taraxacoides (Woot. & Standl.) W.L.Wagner
- Oenothera triloba Nutt. – stemless evening primrose (North America)

== Section Leucocoryne ==
Oenothera sect. Leucocoryne W.L.Wagner & Hoch – from southern Texas, through northern Mexico to the Trans-Volcanic Belt of central Mexico, southward to Guatemala, Nicaragua, and Costa Rica.

- Oenothera dissecta A. Gray ex S. Wats. - (Chihuahuan Desert)
- Oenothera kunthiana Munz - (southern Texas to Costa Rica)
- Oenothera luciae-julianiae W.L.Wagner - (Mexico)
- Oenothera orizabae W.L.Wagner - (Mexico)
- Oenothera tetraptera Cav. - (Mexico, southern Texas)

== Section Megapterium ==
Oenothera sect. Megapterium (Spach) W.L.Wagner & Hoch – distributed in south-central North America.

- Oenothera brachycarpa A.Gray – short-fruit evening primrose (Arizona, Kansas, New Mexico, Nevada, Texas)
- Oenothera howardii (A. Nelson) W.L.Wagner – Howard's evening primrose (Colorado, Kansas, Nevada, Utah, Wyoming)
- Oenothera macrocarpa Nutt. – Missouri or big-fruit evening primrose
  - O. macrocarpa ssp. fremontii (S.Watson) W.L.Wagner – Fremont's evening primrose (Kansas, Nebraska)
  - O. macrocarpa ssp. incana (A.Gray) W.L.Wagner – big-fruit evening primrose (Kansas, Oklahoma, Texas)
  - O. macrocarpa ssp. macrocarpa – big-fruit evening primrose (Arkansas, Illinois, Kansas, Missouri, Oklahoma, Colorado, Tennessee, Texas)
  - O. macrocarpa ssp. mexicana W.L.Wagner – (Mexico)
  - O. macrocarpa ssp. oklahomensis (J.B.S.Norton) W.L.Wagner – Oklahoma evening primrose (Kansas, Oklahoma, Texas)

== Section Oenothera ==
Oenothera sect. Oenothera – distributed from Canada to Panama.

=== subsect. Candela ===
- Oenothera clelandii W.Dietr. P.H. Raven & W.L.Wagner – Cleland's evening primrose
- Oenothera curtissii Small – Curtiss' evening primrose (Alabama, Florida, Georgia, Mississippi, South Carolina)
- Oenothera heterophylla Spach – variable-leaf evening primrose
  - O. heterophylla ssp. heterophylla – (Arkansas, Louisiana, Missouri, Texas)
  - O. heterophylla ssp. orientalis W.Dietr., P.H.Raven & W.L.Wagner – (AL, Arkansas)
- Oenothera rhombipetala Nutt. ex Torr. & A.Gray

=== subsect. Emersonia ===
- Oenothera macrosceles A.Gray – (Chihuahuan Desert)
- Oenothera maysillesii Munz – (Durango)
- Oenothera organensis Munz – (New Mexico)
- Oenothera stubbei W.Dietr., P.H.Raven & W.L.Wagner – (Nuevo León)

=== subsect. Munzia ===
==== series Allochroa ====
- Oenothera affinis Cambess. – (Bolivia, Brazil, Chile)
- Oenothera arequipensis Munz & I M.Johnst. – (Chile)
- Oenothera bahia-blancae W.Dietr. – (Argentina)
- Oenothera catharinensis Cambess. – (Brazil)
- Oenothera coquimbensis Gay – (Chile)
- Oenothera featherstonei Munz & I.M.Johnst. – (Peru)
- Oenothera indecora Cambess.
  - O. indecora ssp. boliviensis W.Dietr.
  - O. indecora ssp. bonariensis W.Dietr.
  - O. indecora ssp. indecora
- Oenothera mendocinensis Gillies ex Hook. & Arn. – (Argentina)
- Oenothera mollissima L. – (Brazil)
- Oenothera montevidensis W.Dietr. – (Uruguay)
- Oenothera odorata Jacq. – (Argentina, Chile)
- Oenothera parodiana Munz
  - O. parodiana ssp. brasiliensis W.Dietr. – (Argentina, Brazil, Uruguay)
  - O. parodiana ssp. parodiana – (Argentina)
  - O. parodiana ssp. strigulosa W.Dietr. – (Argentina)
- Oenothera picensis Phil.
  - O. picensis ssp. bonariensis W.Dietr. – (Argentina)
  - O. picensis ssp. cordobensis W.Dietr. – (Argentina)
  - O. picensis ssp. picensis – (Chile)
- Oenothera ravenii W.Dietr. – (Argentina, Brazil, Chile, Uruguay)
  - O. ravenii ssp. argentinae W.Dietr. – (Argentina, Brazil)
  - O. ravenii ssp. chilensis W.Dietr. – (Chile)
  - O. ravenii ssp. ravenii – (Brazil)
- Oenothera stricta Ledeb. ex Link
  - O. stricta ssp. altissima W.Dietr. – (Argentina)
  - O. stricta ssp. argentinae W.Dietr. – (Argentina)
  - O. stricta ssp. stricta – (Chile)

==== series Clelandia ====
- Oenothera elongata Rusby – (Bolivia, Peru)
- Oenothera punae Kuntze – (Bolivia)
- Oenothera siambonensis W.Dietr. – (Argentina)
- Oenothera villaricae W.Dietr. – (Argentina, Chile)

==== series Renneria ====
- Oenothera longituba W.Dietr. – (Argentina)
- Oenothera nana Griseb. – (Argentina, Bolivia, Chile, Peru)
- Oenothera pedunculifolia W.Dietr. – (Argentina)
- Oenothera peruana W.Dietr. – (Chile, Peru)
- Oenothera sandiana Hassk. – (Chile, Ecuador)
- Oenothera santarii W.Dietr. – (Argentina)
- Oenothera scabra K.Krause
  - O. scabra ssp. scabra – (Bolivia, Peru)
  - O. scabra ssp. ucrosensis W.Dietr. – (Peru)
- Oenothera tafiensis W.Dietr.
  - O. tafiensis ssp. parviflora W.Dietr. – (Argentina)
  - O. tafiensis ssp. tafiensis – (Argentina)
- Oenothera tarijensis W.Dietr. – (Bolivia)
- Oenothera versicolor Lehm. – (Bolivia, Ecuador, Peru)

=== subsect. Nutantigemma ===
- Oenothera breedlovei W.Dietr. & W.L.Wagner - (Mexico)
- Oenothera pennellii Munz - (Mexico)
- Oenothera pubescens Willd. ex Spreng. – South American evening primrose (southwestern U.S to western South America)
- Oenothera tamrae W.Dietr. & W.L.Wagner - (Mexico)

=== subsect. Oenothera ===
- Oenothera argillicola Mack. – shale-barren evening primrose (MD, PA, VA, WV)
- Oenothera biennis L. – common evening primrose (North America)
- Oenothera elata Kunth – Hooker's evening primrose (western North America)
  - O. elata ssp. elata – (Mexico, Central America)
  - O. elata ssp. hirsutissima (A.Gray ex S.Watson) W.Dietr. – (western U.S.)
  - O. elata ssp. hookeri (Torr. & A.Gray) W.Dietr. & W.L.Wagner
  - O. elata ssp. texensis W.Dietr. & W.L.Wagner – (Texas)
- Oenothera glazioviana Micheli – red-sepal evening primrose (North America)
- Oenothera grandiflora L'Hér. – large-flower evening primrose (eastern North America)
- Oenothera jamesii Torr. & A.Gray – trumpet evening primrose (Mexico, KS, OK, TX)
- Oenothera longissima Rydb. – long-stem evening primrose (southwestern North America)
- Oenothera nutans G.F.Atk. & Bartlett – nodding evening primrose (eastern North America)
- Oenothera oakesiana (A.Gray) J.W.Robbins ex S.Watson – Oakes' evening primrose (eastern North America)
- Oenothera parviflora L. – northern evening primrose (North America)
- Oenothera villosa Thunb. – hairy evening primrose (North America)
  - O. villosa ssp. strigosa (Rydb.) W. Dietr. & P.H. Raven
  - O. villosa ssp. villosa
- Oenothera wolfii (Munz) P.H.Raven W.Dietr. & Stubbe – Wolf's evening primrose (California)

=== subsect. Raimannia ===
- Oenothera drummondii Hook. – beach evening primrose
  - O. drummondii ssp. drummondii – (Atlantic coast, North Carolina to Mexico)
  - O. drummondii ssp. thalassaphila (Brandegee) W.Dietr. & W.L.Wagner – (southern Baja California coast)
- Oenothera falfurriae W.Dietr. & W.L.Wagner – royal evening primrose (southeastern Texas)
- Oenothera grandis (Britton) Smyth – showy evening primrose (U.S. & Mexico)
- Oenothera humifusa Nutt. – sea-beach evening primrose (southeast U.S.)
- Oenothera laciniata Hill – cutleaf evening primrose (North & South America)
  - O. laciniata ssp. laciniata
  - O. laciniata ssp. pubescens (Willd. ex Spreng.) Munz – (Ecuador)
- Oenothera mexicana Spach – Mexican evening primrose (southeastern Texas)
- Oenothera resicum E.Benavides, JR.Kuethe, A.Ortiz-Alcaraz, JLL DE LA LUZ –(Mexico)

== Section Pachylophus ==
Oenothera sect. Pachylophus (Spach) W.L.Wagner – western North America.

- Oenothera brandegeei (Munz) P.H.Raven – (near Bahia de los Angeles)
- Oenothera cavernae Munz – cave-dwelling evening primrose (AZ, NV, UT)
- Oenothera cespitosa Nutt.1813
  - O. cespitosa ssp. cespitosa – tufted evening primrose (western North America)
  - O. cespitosa ssp. crinita (Rydb.) Munz – tufted evening primrose (southwest North America)
  - O. cespitosa ssp. macroglottis (Rydb.) W.L.Wagner, Stockh. & W.M.Klein – tufted evening primrose (CO, NM, UT, WY)
  - O. cespitosa ssp. marginata (Nutt. ex Hook. & Arn.) Munz – tufted evening primrose
  - O. cespitosa ssp. navajoensis W.L.Wagner, Stockh, & W.M.Klein – Navajo evening primrose (AZ, NM, NV, UT)
- Oenothera harringtonii W.L.Wagner, Stockh. & W.M.Klein – Colorado Springs evening primrose (Colorado)
- Oenothera psammophila (A.Nels. & J.F.Macbr.) W.L.Wagner, Stockh. & W.M.Klein – St. Anthony Dunes evening primrose (Idaho)

== Section Paradoxus ==
Oenothera sect. Paradoxus W. L. Wagner – distribution within the Chihuahuan Desert.

- Oenothera havardii S.Watson − Havard's evening primrose (Arizona, Texas)

== Section Peniophyllum ==
Oenothera sect. Peniophyllum (Pennell) Munz – The single species is found in the southeastern U.S.

- Oenothera linifolia Nutt. – thread-leaf evening primrose

== Section Ravenia ==
Oenothera sect. Ravenia W.L.Wagner – within Mexico.

- Oenothera muelleri Munz – (northeast Mexico)
- Oenothera riskindii W.L.Wagner – (Coahuila)
- Oenothera tubifera Ser.
  - O. tubifera ssp. macrocarpa W.L.Wagner – (Durango)
  - O. tubifera ssp. tubifera

== Section Xanthocoryne ==
Oenothera sect. Xanthocoryne W.L.Wagner & Hoch – from central Mexico to northern South America.

- Oenothera epilobiifolia Kunth – (Colombia, Mexico)
  - O. epilobiifolia ssp. cuprea (Schlecht.) P.H.Raven & D.R.Parn.
  - O. epilobiifolia ssp. epilobiifolia – (Venezuela)
- Oenothera multicaulis Ruíz & Pav. – (South America)
- Oenothera seifrizii Munz – (Colombia, Venezuela)
