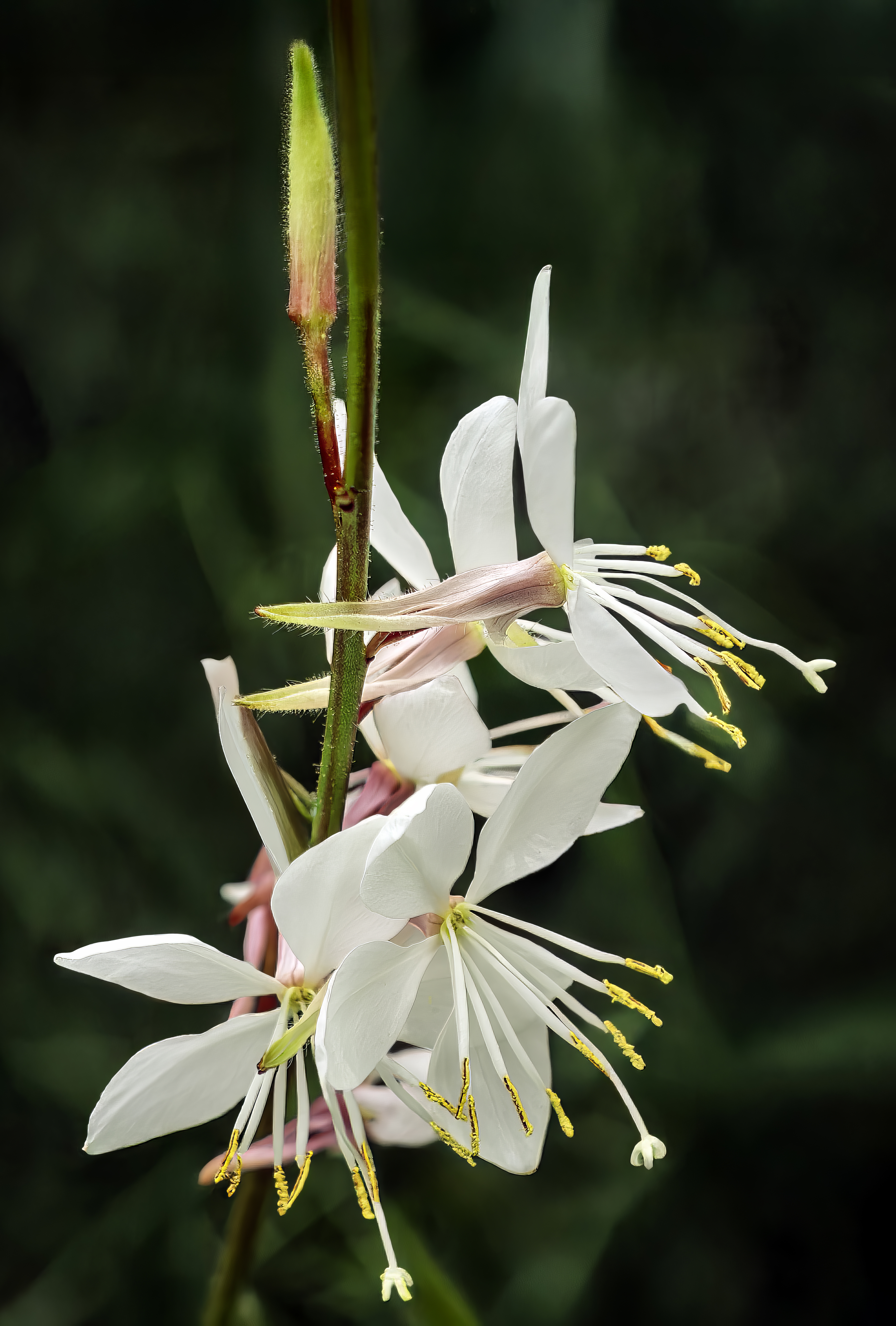
- Gaura lindheimeri

Scientific classification
- Kingdom: Plantae
- Clade: Embryophytes
- Clade: Tracheophytes
- Clade: Angiosperms
- Clade: Eudicots
- Clade: Rosids
- Order: Myrtales
- Family: Onagraceae
- Subfamily: Onagroideae
- Tribe: Onagreae
- Genus: Gaura; L.

Species
- See text

Synonyms
- Stenosiphon Spach

= Gaura =

Genus of flowering plants

Gaura was a genus of flowering plants in the family Onagraceae, native to North America. The name was derived from Greek γαῦρος (gaûros) meaning "superb" and named in reference to the stature and floral display of some species in this genus. The genus included many species known commonly as beeblossoms. Genetic research showed that the genus was paraphyletic unless the monotypic genus Stenosiphon is included within Gaura, increasing the number of species in the genus to 22. Gaura is now a synonym of Oenothera, with the bulk of the Gaura taxa in genus Oenothera sect. Gaura (L.) W.L.Wagner &Hoch.

Gauras are annual, biennial or perennial herbaceous plants; most are perennials with sturdy rhizomes, often forming dense thickets, crowding or shading out other plant species. They have a basal rosette of leaves, with erect or spreading flowering stems up to 2 m (rarely more) tall, leafy on the lower stem, branched and leafless on the upper stem. The flowers have four (rarely three) petals; they are zygomorphic, with all the petals directed somewhat upwards. The fruit is an indehiscent nut-like body containing reddish-brown seeds. It reproduces via seeds and also by rhizome growth.

Species formerly in Gaura

- Gaura angustifolia
- Gaura biennis
- Gaura boquillensis
- Gaura brachycarpa
- Gaura calcicola
- Gaura coccinea
- Gaura demareei
- Gaura drummondii
- Gaura filipes
- Gaura hexandra
- Gaura lindheimeri
- Gaura linifolia (syn. Stenosiphon linifolius)
- Gaura longiflora
- Gaura macrocarpa
- Gaura mckelveyae
- Gaura mutabilis
- Gaura neomexicana
- Gaura parviflora (syn. G. mollis)
- Gaura sinuata
- Gaura suffulta
- Gaura triangulata
- Gaura villosa

Several species of the former Gaura are regarded as noxious weeds, especially in disturbed or overgrazed areas where it easily takes hold. They can become a nuisance in situations involving disturbed habitat, such as trampled rangeland and clearings. Efforts to control Gaura focus mainly on prevention of misuse of land. There is no biological control method for plants of genus Gaura, and removing existing infestations is difficult, due in large part to the plants' ability to reproduce from bits of rhizome left in the ground.

Despite the poor reputation of these plants, some species are cultivated as garden plants, such as G. lindheimeri (white gaura).

== Synonymy ==
In 2007, Warren L. Wagner, Peter C. Hoch, and Peter H. Raven published a Revised Classification of the Onagraceae, which moved the bulk of the Gaura taxa into genus Oenothera sect. Gaura (L.) W.L.Wagner &Hoch and made Gaura a synonym of Oenothera. The following table shows where the Gaura taxa have been placed.

Synonym	Accepted Name	Common Name
Gaura L. 1753	Oenothera L. 1753	beeblossom
Oenothera sect. Gaura subsect. Gauridium
Gaura mutabilis Cav. 1795	O. anomala Curtis 1797	anomalous Oenothera
Oenothera sect. Gaura subsect. Stenosiphon
Stenosiphon virgatus Spach 1835	O. glaucifolia W.L.Wagner & Hoch 2007	false gaura
Stenosiphon linifolius (Nutt. ex E.James) Heynh. 1840	O. glaucifolia W.L.Wagner & Hoch 2007	false gaura
Oenothera sect. Gaura subsect. Schizocarya
Gaura mollis Kunth 1823	O. curtiflora W.L.Wagner & Hoch 2007	velvetweed, smallflowered gaura, velvety gaura, willow gaura
Gaura parviflora Douglas ex Lehm. 1830	O. curtiflora W.L.Wagner & Hoch 2007	velvetweed, smallflowered gaura, velvety gaura, willow gaura
G. parviflora var. lachnocarpa Weath. 1925	O. curtiflora W.L.Wagner & Hoch 2007	velvetweed, smallflowered gaura, velvety gaura, willow gaura
G. parviflora var. parviflora	O. curtiflora W.L.Wagner & Hoch 2007	velvetweed, smallflowered gaura, velvety gaura, willow gaura
Oenothera sect. Gaura subsect. Xerogaura
Gaura macrocarpa Rothr. 1866	O. arida W.L.Wagner & Hoch 2007	Trans-Pecos beeblossom
Oenothera sect. Gaura subsect. Campogaura
Gaura boquillensis P.H.Raven & D.P.Greg. 1972	O. boquillensis (P.H.Raven & D.P.Greg.); W.L.Wagner & Hoch 2007	Rio Grande beeblossom
Gaura coccinea Pursh 1814	O. suffrutescens (Ser.); W.L.Wagner & Hoch 2007	scarlet beeblossom, scarlet gaura
G. coccinea var. arizonica Munz 1938	O. suffrutescens (Ser.); W.L.Wagner & Hoch 2007	scarlet beeblossom, scarlet gaura
G. coccinea var. epilobioides (Kunth) Munz 1938	O. suffrutescens (Ser.); W.L.Wagner & Hoch 2007	scarlet beeblossom, scarlet gaura
G. coccinea var. glabra (Lehm.) Munz 1938	O. suffrutescens (Ser.); W.L.Wagner & Hoch 2007	scarlet beeblossom, scarlet gaura
G. coccinea var. parvifolia (Torr.) Rickett 1934	O. suffrutescens (Ser.); W.L.Wagner & Hoch 2007	scarlet beeblossom, scarlet gaura
G. coccinea var. coccinea	O. suffrutescens (Ser.); W.L.Wagner & Hoch 2007	scarlet beeblossom, scarlet gaura
Gaura glabra Lehm. 1830	O. suffrutescens (Ser.); W.L.Wagner & Hoch 2007	scarlet beeblossom, scarlet gaura
Gaura odorata Sessé ex Lag. 1816	O. suffrutescens (Ser.); W.L.Wagner & Hoch 2007	scarlet beeblossom, scarlet gaura
Oenothera sect. Gaura subsect. Stipogaura
Gaura calcicola P.H. Raven & D.P.Greg. 1972	O. calcicola (P.H.Raven & D.P.Greg.); W.L.Wagner & Hoch 2007	Texas beeblossom
Gaura villosa Torr.	O. cinerea (Wooton & Standl.); W.L.Wagner & Hoch 2007	woolly beeblossom, woolly gaura
G. villosa ssp. villosa Torr. 1827	O. cinerea ssp. cinerea (Wooton & Standl.); W.L.Wagner & Hoch 2007	woolly beeblossom
G. villosa var. villosa	O. cinerea ssp. cinerea (Wooton & Standl.); W.L.Wagner & Hoch 2007	woolly beeblossom
G. villosa var. arenicola Munz 1938	O. cinerea ssp. cinerea (Wooton & Standl.); W.L.Wagner & Hoch 2007	woolly beeblossom
G. villosa ssp. parksii (Munz) P.H.Raven & D.P.Greg. 1972	O. cinerea ssp. parksii (Munz); W.L.Wagner & Hoch 2007	hairy gaura, Parks' beeblossom
G. villosa var. parksii Munz 1938	O. cinerea ssp. parksii (Munz); W.L.Wagner & Hoch 2007	hairy gaura, Parks' beeblossom
G. villosa var. mckelveyae Munz 1938	O. mckelveyae (Munz); W.L.Wagner & Hoch 2007	Mckelvey's beeblossom
Gaura mckelveyae (Munz) P.H.Raven & D.P.Greg. 1972	O. mckelveyae (Munz); W.L.Wagner & Hoch 2007	Mckelvey's beeblossom
Gaura filipes Spach 1835	O. filipes (Spach); W.L.Wagner & Hoch 2007	slenderstalk beeblossom
G. filipes var. major Torr. & A. Gray 1840	O. filipes (Spach); W.L.Wagner & Hoch 2007	slenderstalk beeblossom
Gaura michauxii Spach 1835	O. filipes (Spach); W.L.Wagner & Hoch 2007	slenderstalk beeblossom
Gaura sinuata Nutt. ex Ser. 1828	O. sinuosa W.L.Wagner & Hoch 2007	wavyleaf beeblossom, wavyleaf gaura
Oenothera sect. Gaura subsect. Xenogaura
Gaura drummondii (Spach) Torr. & A. Gray 1840	O. xenogaura W.L.Wagner & Hoch 2007	Drummond's beeblossom, scented gaura
Oenothera sect. Gaura subsect. Gaura
Gaura neomexicana Wooton 1898	O. coloradensis ssp. neomexicana (Wooton) W.L.Wagner & Hoch 2007	New Mexico beeblossom
G. neomexicana ssp. neomexicana	O. coloradensis ssp. neomexicana (Wooton) W.L.Wagner & Hoch 2007	New Mexico beeblossom
G. neomexicana var. neomexicana	O. coloradensis ssp. neomexicana (Wooton) W.L.Wagner & Hoch 2007	New Mexico beeblossom
G. neomexicana ssp. coloradensis (Rydb.) P.H.Raven & D.P.Greg. 1972	O. coloradensis ssp. coloradensis (Rydb.) W.L.Wagner & Hoch 2007	Colorado beeblossom, Colorado butterfly plant
G. neomexicana var. coloradensis (Rydb.) Munz 1938	O. coloradensis ssp. coloradensis (Rydb.) W.L.Wagner & Hoch 2007	Colorado beeblossom, Colorado butterfly plant
Gaura demareei P.H.Raven & D.P.Greg. 1972	O. demareei (P.H.Raven & D.P.Greg.); W.L.Wagner & Hoch 2007	Demaree's beeblossom
Gaura biennis L. 1743	O. gaura W.L.Wagner & Hoch 2007	biennial beeblossom
G. biennis var. pitcheri Torr. & A. Gray 1840	O. filiformis (Small); W.L.Wagner & Hoch 2007	longflower beeblossom
Gaura pitcheri (Torr. & A.Gray) Small 1903	O. filiformis (Small); W.L.Wagner & Hoch 2007	longflower beeblossom
Gaura filiformis Small 1898	O. filiformis (Small); W.L.Wagner & Hoch 2007	longflower beeblossom
Gaura longiflora Spach 1835	O. filiformis (Small); W.L.Wagner & Hoch 2007	longflower beeblossom
Gaura tripetala Cav. 1797	O. hexandra ssp. hexandra (Ortega) W.L.Wagner & Hoch 2007	harlequin bush, slender gaura
Gaura hexandra Ortega 1797	O. hexandra ssp. hexandra (Ortega) W.L.Wagner & Hoch 2007	harlequin bush, slender gaura
G. hexandra var. hexandra	O. hexandra ssp. hexandra (Ortega) W.L.Wagner & Hoch 2007	harlequin bush, slender gaura
G. hexandra ssp. hexandra	O. hexandra ssp. hexandra (Ortega) W.L.Wagner & Hoch 2007	harlequin bush, slender gaura
G. hexandra ssp. gracilis (Wooton & Standl.) P.H.Raven & D.P.Greg. 1972	O. hexandra ssp. gracilis (Wooton & Standl.); W.L.Wagner & Hoch 2007	harlequin bush
Gaura gracilis Wooton & Standl. 1913	O. hexandra ssp. gracilis (Wooton & Standl.); W.L.Wagner & Hoch 2007	harlequin bush
G. hexandra var. coryi (Munz) Munz 1965	O. patriciae W.L.Wagner & Hoch 2007	plains beeblossom
G. tripetala var. coryi Munz 1938	O. patriciae W.L.Wagner & Hoch 2007	plains beeblossom
Gaura brachycarpa Small 1903	O. patriciae W.L.Wagner & Hoch 2007	plains beeblossom
G. hexandra var. triangulata (Buckley) Munz 1965	O. triangulata (Buckley); W.L.Wagner & Hoch 2007	prairie beeblossom, three-petal gaura
Gaura triangulata Buckley 1862	O. triangulata (Buckley); W.L.Wagner & Hoch 2007	prairie beeblossom, three-petal gaura
G. tripetala var. triangulata (Buckley) Munz 1938	O. triangulata (Buckley); W.L.Wagner & Hoch 2007	prairie beeblossom, three-petal gaura
Gaura angustifolia Michx. 1803	O. simulans (Small); W.L.Wagner & Hoch 2007	southern beeblossom
Gaura eatonii Small 1913	O. simulans (Small); W.L.Wagner & Hoch 2007	southern beeblossom
Gaura simulans Small 1905	O. simulans (Small); W.L.Wagner & Hoch 2007	southern beeblossom
Gaura suffulta Engelm. ex A. Gray 1850	O. suffulta (Engelm.); W.L.Wagner & Hoch 2007	kisses, roadside gaura
G. suffulta ssp. suffulta	O. suffulta (Engelm.); W.L.Wagner & Hoch 2007	kisses, roadside gaura
G. suffulta ssp. nealleyi (J.M. Coult.) P.H.Raven & D.P.Greg. 1972	O. suffulta ssp. nealleyi (J.M. Coult.) W.L.Wagner & Hoch 2007	Nealley's kisses
Gaura nealleyi J.M. Coult. 1890	O. suffulta ssp. nealleyi (J.M. Coult.) W.L.Wagner & Hoch 2007	Nealley's kisses
Gaura lindheimeri Engelm. & A.Gray 1845	O. lindheimeri (Engelm. & A.Gray); W.L.Wagner & Hoch 2007	Lindheimer's beeblossom, white gaura
Clarkia sect. Phaeostoma subsect. Heterogaura
Gaura heterandra Torr. 1857	C. heterandra (Torr.); F.H.Lewis & P.H.Raven 1992	mountain clarkia
Eremothera
Gaura decorticans Hook. & Arn. 1841	E. boothii ssp. decorticans (Hook. & Arn.); W.L.Wagner & Hoch 2007	Shredding suncup
