= Stenosiphon =

Stenosiphon is the scientific name of two genera of organisms and may refer to:

- Stenosiphon (cephalopod), a prehistoric genus of nautiloids
- Stenosiphon (plant), a genus of plants in the family Onagraceae
