= Warren Wagner =

Warren Wagner may refer to:

- Warren H. Wagner (1920–2000), American botanist
- Warren Lambert Wagner (born 1950), American botanist
