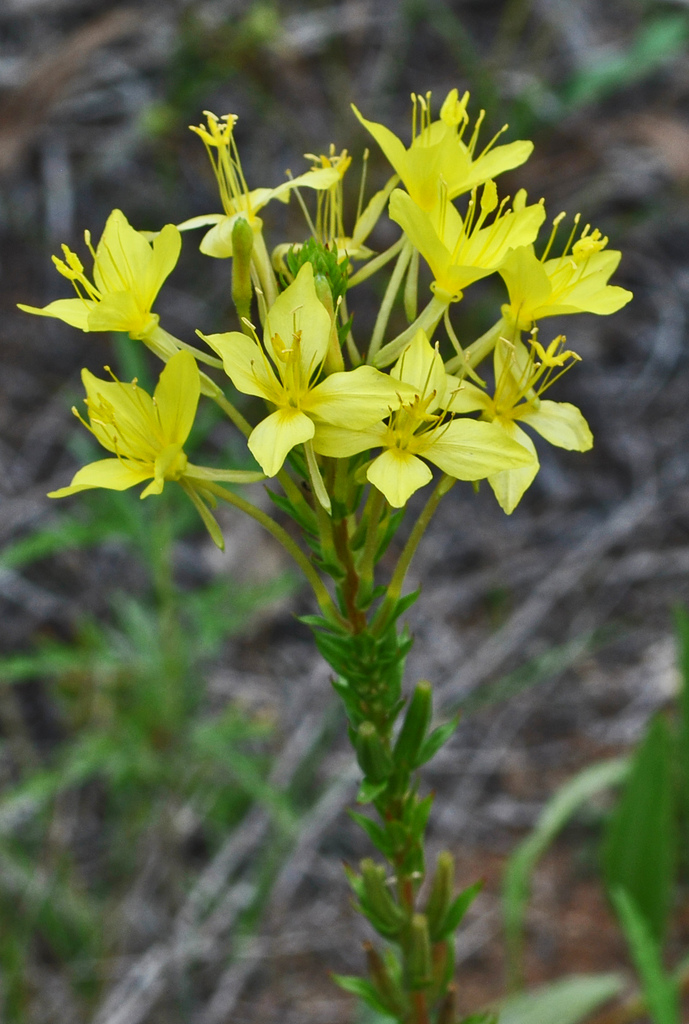
- Flowers

Scientific classification
- Kingdom: Plantae
- Clade: Tracheophytes
- Clade: Angiosperms
- Clade: Eudicots
- Clade: Rosids
- Order: Myrtales
- Family: Onagraceae
- Genus: Oenothera
- Species: O. clelandii

Binomial name
- Oenothera clelandii W.Dietr., P.H.Raven & W.L.Wagner

= Oenothera clelandii =

Species of plant

Oenothera clelandii, or the lesser four-point evening-primrose, is a species of flowering plant in the family Onagraceae. It is native to Ontario, Canada, and the east-central United States. A perennial or biennial reaching 40 in (1 m), it prefers to grow in sandy soils in prairies and fields.
