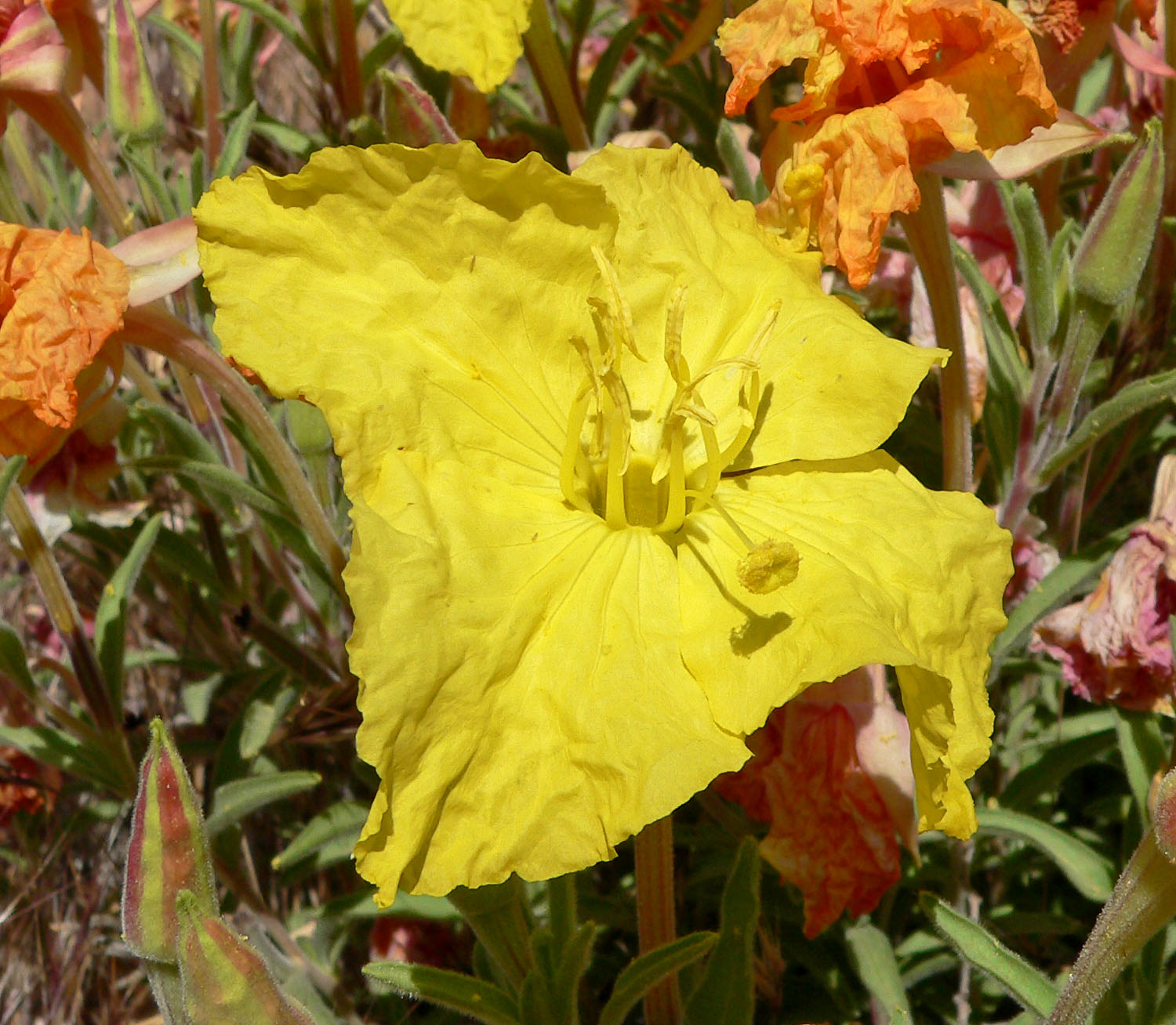

Scientific classification
- Kingdom: Plantae
- Clade: Tracheophytes
- Clade: Angiosperms
- Clade: Eudicots
- Clade: Rosids
- Order: Myrtales
- Family: Onagraceae
- Genus: Oenothera
- Species: O. lavandulifolia

Binomial name
- Oenothera lavandulifolia Torr. & A.Gray

Synonyms
- List: Calylophus hartwegii subsp. lavanulifolia; Calylophus hartwegii var. lavanulifolia; Calylophus lavandulifolia; Galpinsia lavandulifolia; Oenothera hartwegii var. lavandulifolia; Oenothera lavandulifolia var. typica

= Oenothera lavandulifolia =

Plant species in the evening primrose family

Oenothera lavandulifolia, commonly called lavender leaf sundrops, is a low-growing perennial plant in the evening primrose family found in the Colorado Plateau and Canyonlands region of the southwestern United States.

== Inflorescence and fruit ==
From May to July it blooms with striking yellow flowers that fade to shades of orange or lavender as the flower dries up.

== Taxonomy ==
Oenothera lavandulifolia was scientifically described and named by John Torrey and Asa Gray in 1840. It is part of the genus Oenothera in the family Onagraceae. It has no accepted subspecies or varieties, but it has 6 synonyms. It has, at times, been considered a variety or subspecies of Oenothera hartwegii.

Table of Synonyms
Name	Year	Rank	Notes
Calylophus hartwegii subsp. lavanulifolia (Torr. & A.Gray) Towner & Raven	1970	subspecies	≡ hom.
Calylophus hartwegii var. lavanulifolia (Torr. & A.Gray) Shinners	1964	variety	≡ hom.
Calylophus lavandulifolia (Torr. & A.Gray) P.H.Raven	1964	species	≡ hom.
Galpinsia lavandulifolia (Torr. & A.Gray) Small	1903	species	= het.
Oenothera hartwegii var. lavandulifolia (Torr. & A.Gray) S.Watson	1873	variety	= het.
Oenothera lavandulifolia var. typica Munz	1929	variety	= het., not validly publ.
Notes: ≡ homotypic synonym; = heterotypic synonym

== Habitat and range ==
It grows in blackbrush scrub and mixed desert shrub up into pinyon juniper woodland and ponderosa pine forest communities, as far north as South Dakota, and up to 8,500 feet (2,600 m) in elevation in the southwest.
