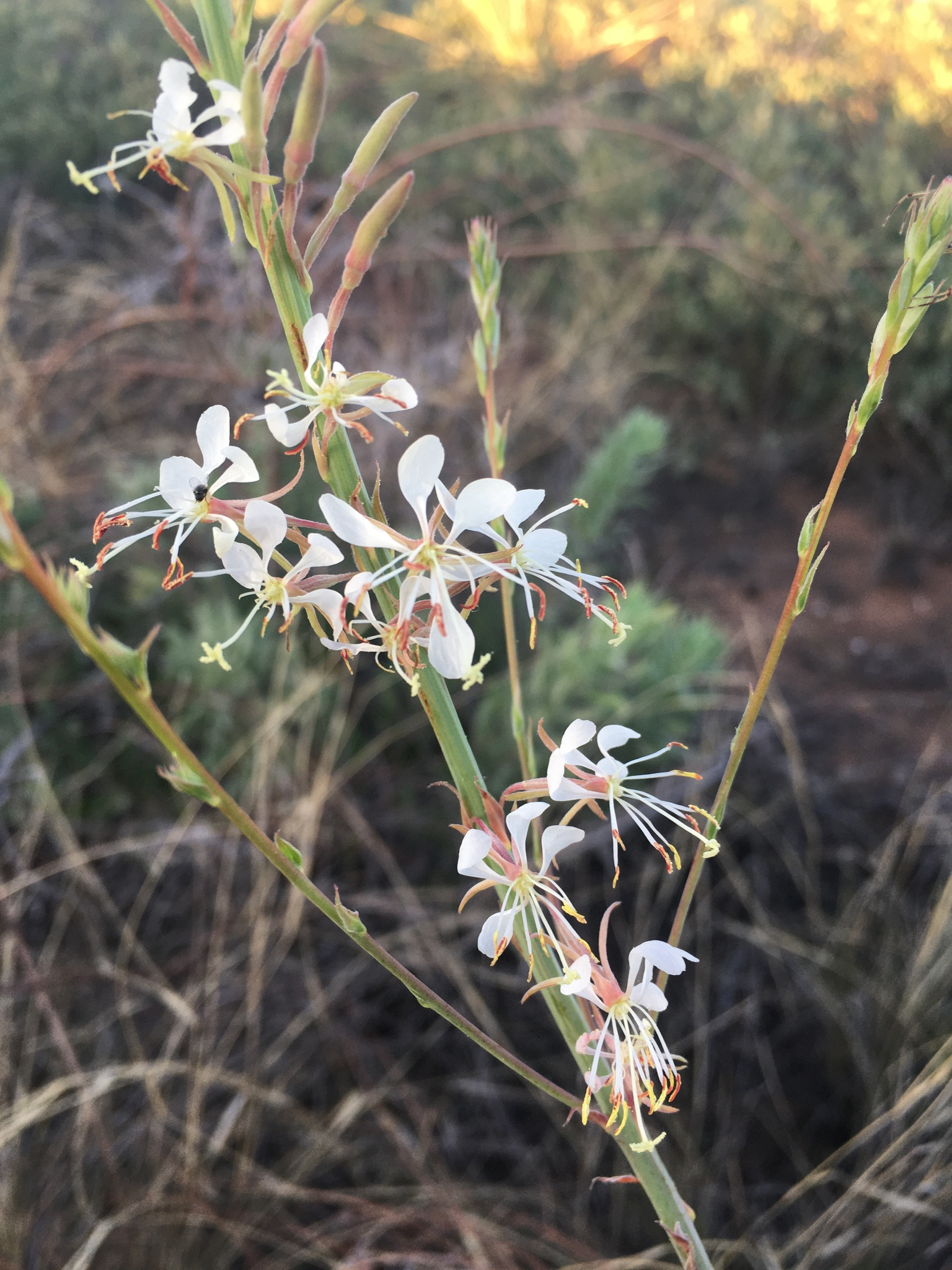
- Southeast of Carlsbad in Eddy County, New Mexico

Scientific classification
- Kingdom: Plantae
- Clade: Tracheophytes
- Clade: Angiosperms
- Clade: Eudicots
- Clade: Rosids
- Order: Myrtales
- Family: Onagraceae
- Genus: Oenothera
- Species: O. cinerea

Binomial name
- Oenothera cinerea (Wooton & Standl.) W.L.Wagner & Hoch

Subspecies
- O. c. subsp. cinerea; O. c. subsp. parksii

Synonyms
- Gaura cinerea Wooton & Standl.; Gaura villosa Torr.

= Oenothera cinerea =

Plant species in the evening-primrose family

Oenothera cinerea, the woolly beeblossom or High Plains beeblossom, is a species of flowering plant in the family Onagraceae. It is native to the US states of Colorado, New Mexico, Kansas, Oklahoma, and Texas, and it has been introduced to New Jersey. A perennial subshrub capable of reaching 2.4 m (8 ft), its flowers start out white and fade to pink.

== Taxonomy ==
In 1913 the botanists E. O. Wooton and Paul Carpenter Standley published a description of a species they named Gaura cinerea. In 2007 Warren Lambert Wagner and Peter Coonan Hoch moved it to the genus Oenothera, giving the species its accepted name.

It has two accepted subspecies:

- Oenothera cinerea subsp. cinerea – entire range, introduced to New Jersey
- Oenothera cinerea subsp. parksii (Munz) W.L.Wagner & Hoch – southern Texas

Oenothera cinerea has 6 synonyms of the species or one of its two subspecies.

Table of Synonyms
| Name | Year | Rank | Synonym of: | Notes |
|---|---|---|---|---|
| Gaura cinerea Wooton & Standl. | 1913 | species | O. cinerea | ≡ hom. |
| Gaura villosa Torr. | 1827 | species | subsp. cinerea | = het. |
| Gaura villosa var. arenicola Munz | 1938 | variety | subsp. cinerea | = het. |
| Gaura villosa subsp. parksii (Munz) P.H.Raven & D.P.Greg. | 1972 | subspecies | subsp. parksii | = het. |
| Gaura villosa var. parksii Munz | 1938 | variety | subsp. parksii | = het. |
| Gaura villosa var. typica Munz | 1938 | variety | subsp. cinerea | = het., not validly publ. |
Notes: ≡ homotypic synonym; = heterotypic synonym
