= Oenothera filipes =

Scientific classification
- Kingdom: Plantae
- Clade: Tracheophytes
- Clade: Angiosperms
- Clade: Eudicots
- Clade: Rosids
- Order: Myrtales
- Family: Onagraceae
- Genus: Oenothera
- Species: O. filipes

Binomial name
- Oenothera filipes (Spach) W.L.Wagner & Hoch

Species of flowering plant

Oenothera filipes, the slenderstalk beeblossom, is a flowering plant in the genus Oenothera. It is a perennial dicot. It is native to parts of the southeastern United States as well as Illinois and Indiana. It was previously categorized in the genus Gaura.

This species reaches a height of 1.5 meters (approximately 4.9 feet). Its flowers are white to pink in color.

O. filipes has been observed growing in dry and well-drained sandy soils. It requires either full sun or only partial shade.
