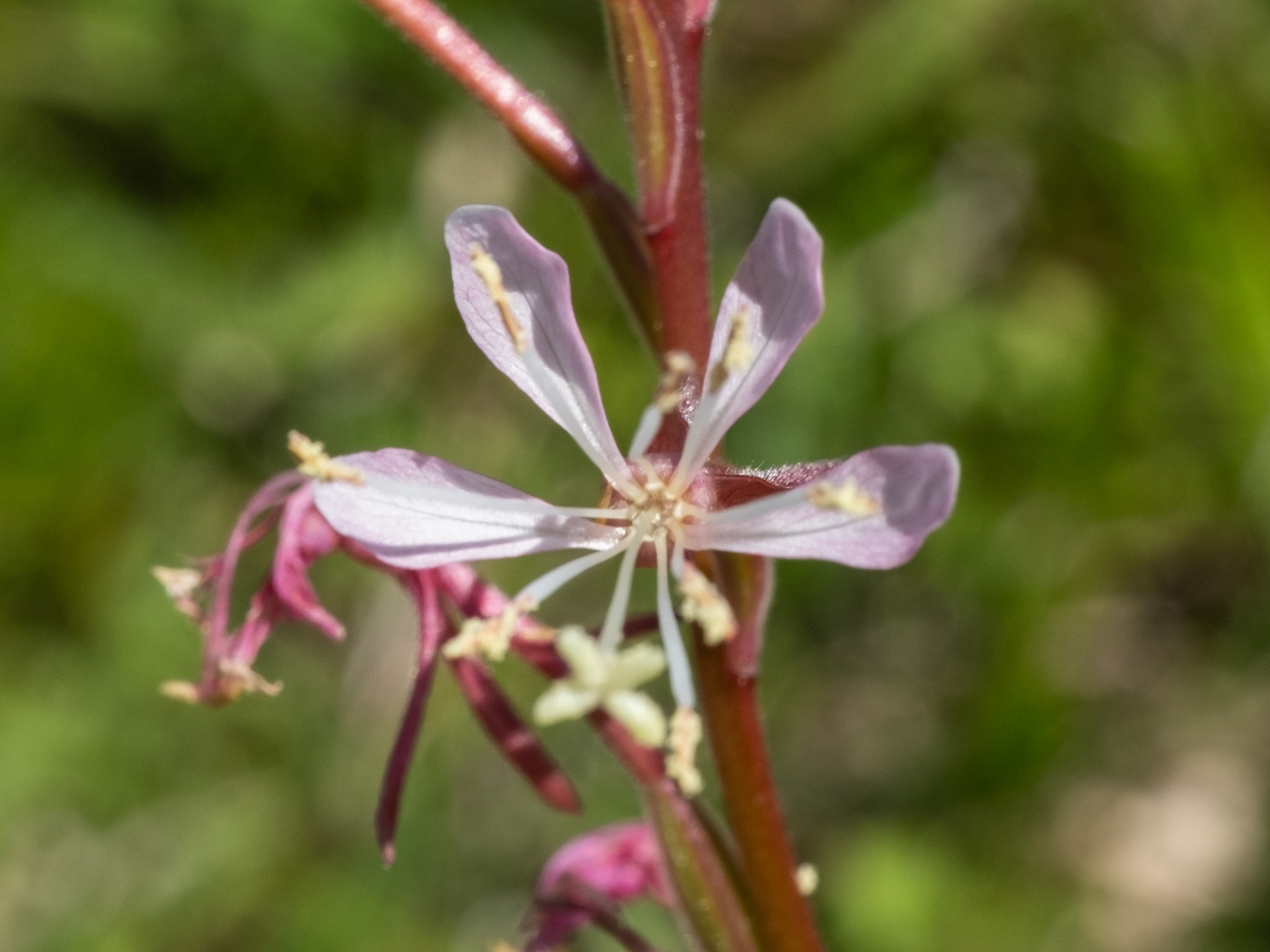

Scientific classification
- Kingdom: Plantae
- Clade: Tracheophytes
- Clade: Angiosperms
- Clade: Eudicots
- Clade: Rosids
- Order: Myrtales
- Family: Onagraceae
- Genus: Oenothera
- Species: O. simulans

Binomial name
- Oenothera simulans (Small) W.L.Wagner & Hoch

Synonyms
- List: Gaura angustifolia Michx.; Gaura angustifolia var. eatonii (Small) Munz; Gaura angustifolia var. simulans (Small) Munz; Gaura angustifolia var. strigosa Munz; Gaura angustifolia var. typica Munz; Gaura eatonii Small; Gaura fruticosa Jacq.; Gaura simulans Small; Gaura undulata Desf.

= Oenothera simulans =

Species of plant

Oenothera simulans, the southern beeblossom, is a species of flowering plant in the family Onagraceae. It is native to the Bahamas and the southeastern United States. An annual reaching 6 ft (1.8 m), it prefers sandy soils and is found growing in dunes, open woodlands, fields, and roadsides.
