= Ann Sakai =

Botanist

Ann K. Sakai
- Education: University of Michigan
- Scientific career
- Thesis: Ecological and evolutionary aspects of sex expression in silver maple (Acer saccharinum L.) (1978)

Ann Kiku Sakai is a plant biologist at the University of California, Irvine known for her work on plant breeding and speciation. She is an elected fellow of the American Association for the Advancement of Science.

== Education and career ==
Sakai received a B.A. from Oberlin College in 1972. She went on to earn a master's degree and a Ph.D. from the University of Michigan working on the ecology of silver maple trees. Following her Ph.D., she held positions at Oakland University and the University of Chicago before moving to the University of California, Irvine where she has been a professor since 2002.

From 1993 until 1994 Sakai was a program officer in the Division of Environmental Biology at the National Science Foundation.

== Research ==
Sakai is known for her work on plant breeding systems and how they have evolved over time. Her research uses two plants as model systems: the genus of Schiedea where she examines dioecy and pollination and the genus Oxalis where she studies heterostyly or variations in shape. Sakai's early research examined the role of temperature in plant survival. She went on to examine spatial patterns in sex of silver maple trees and aspen trees. Sakai has examined sex expression and inbreeding in Schiedea flowering plants. She has also used Hawaiian plants as a model to examine dioecy, or the presentation of separate male and female plants. Some of the plants Sakai researches are endangered species, and she has examined the reasons for declining plant populations and the population genetics of invasive species. Her work includes collaborations with Stephen Weller, including the observation that pollination of Schiedea flowering plants occurs through the actions of a Hawaiian moth. Her work on conservation of Schiedea kauaiensis was portrayed in a 2019 video describing how she is studying and protecting rare plants in Kaua'i, Hawaii, through her work with students, amateur botanists, and the National Tropical Botanical Garden.

Sakai has defined the conditions that lead to a lack of retention of women in science and has sought to broaden participation of underrepresented groups. In 2011, Sakai received funding from the National Science Foundation to establish the PLANTS program (Preparing Leaders and Nurturing Tomorrow's Scientists) which aims to broaden participation of underrepresented groups in botany. In the period from 2011 until 2015, more than 60 students were able to use this funding to attend a botany meeting and interact with mentors in the field.

== Selected publications ==
- Sakai, Ann K.; Allendorf, Fred W.; Holt, Jodie S.; Lodge, David M.; Molofsky, Jane; With, Kimberly A.; Baughman, Syndallas; Cabin, Robert J.; Cohen, Joel E.; Ellstrand, Norman C.; McCauley, David E.; O'Neil, Pamela; Parker, Ingrid M.; Thompson, John N.; Weller, Stephen G. (1 November 2001). "The Population Biology of Invasive Species". Annual Review of Ecology and Systematics. 32 (1): 305–332. doi:10.1146/annurev.ecolsys.32.081501.114037. ISSN 0066-4162.
- Sakai, Ann K.; Wagner, Warren L.; Mehrhoff, Loyal A. (1 March 2002). "Patterns of Endangerment in the Hawaiian Flora". Systematic Biology. 51 (2): 276–302. doi:10.1080/10635150252899770. ISSN 1076-836X. PMID 12028733.
- Sakai, Ann K.; Weller, Stephen G. (1999). Gender and Sexual Dimorphism in Flowering Plants: A review of Terminology, Biogeographic Patterns, Ecological Correlates, and Phylogenetic Approaches. pp. 1–31. doi:10.1007/978-3-662-03908-3_1. ISBN 978-3-642-08424-9.
- Culley, Theresa M.; Weller, Stephen G.; Sakai, Ann K. (2002). "The evolution of wind pollination in angiosperms". Trends in Ecology & Evolution. 17 (8): 361–369. doi:10.1016/S0169-5347(02)02540-5.
- Sakai, Ann K.; Wagner, Warren L.; Ferguson, Diane M.; Herbst, Derral R. (1995). "Origins of Dioecy in the Hawaiian Flora". Ecology. 76 (8): 2517–2529. doi:10.2307/2265825. JSTOR 2265825.

== Awards and honors ==
Sakai was elected a fellow of the American Association for the Advancement of Science in 2012. In 2019, Sakai was named a Distinguished Fellow of the Botanical Society of America, the highest honor bestowed by the society.
