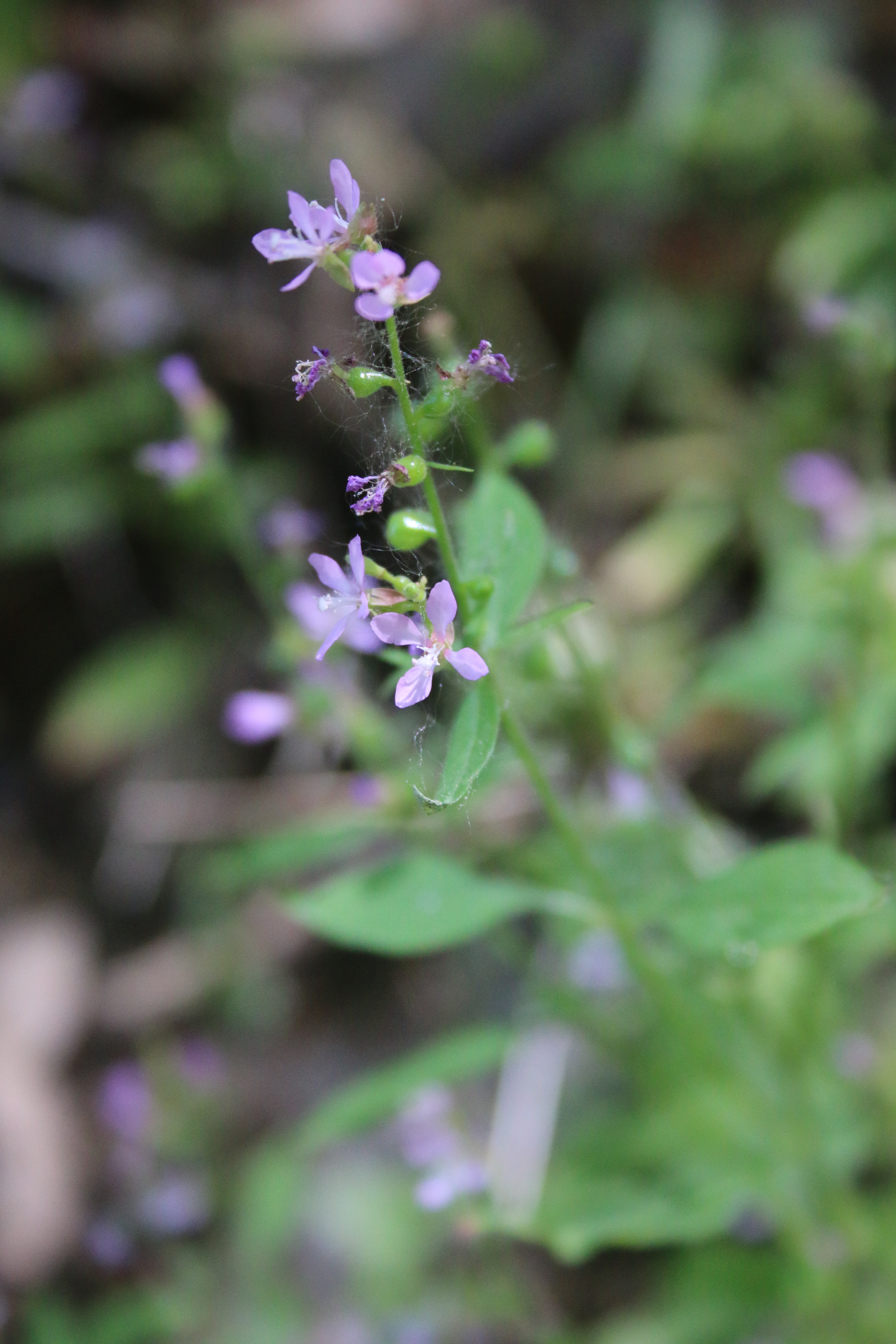

Scientific classification
- Kingdom: Plantae
- Clade: Tracheophytes
- Clade: Angiosperms
- Clade: Eudicots
- Clade: Rosids
- Order: Myrtales
- Family: Onagraceae
- Genus: Clarkia
- Species: C. heterandra

Binomial name
- Clarkia heterandra (Torr.) F.H.Lewis & P.H.Raven

Synonyms
- Gaura heterandra Torr.

= Clarkia heterandra =

Species of flowering plant

Clarkia heterandra is a species of flowering plant in the family Onagraceae known by the common name mountain clarkia. It is endemic to California, where it is from the forests and woodlands of several of eastern and western mountain ranges. It is an annual herb producing an erect, glandular stem to around half a meter in maximum height. The lance-shaped to oval leaves are up to 8 centimeters long and are borne on petioles of up to 2 centimeters. The top of the stem is occupied by the inflorescence, with open flowers and closed buds. The sepals remain fused as the flower blooms from one side. The pink petals are oval in shape and just a few millimeters long. There are 8 stamens, some large and some small and sterile. The fruit is a small, hard body 2 or 3 millimeters long containing 1 or 2 seeds.
