= Oenothera hispida =

Conservation status
- Secure (NatureServe)

Scientific classification
- Kingdom: Plantae
- Clade: Embryophytes
- Clade: Tracheophytes
- Clade: Spermatophytes
- Clade: Angiosperms
- Clade: Eudicots
- Clade: Rosids
- Order: Myrtales
- Family: Onagraceae
- Genus: Oenothera
- Species: O. hispida

Binomial name
- Oenothera hispida (Benth.) W.L.Wagner, Hoch & Zarucchi

Synonyms
- Gaura hispida Benth. Schizocarya drummondii Spach; Gaura drummondii (Spach) Torr. & Gray; Oenothera xenogaura W.L.Wagner & Hoch

Species of flowering plant

Oenothera hispida (known as Gaura drummondii prior to 2007) is a species of flowering plant in the evening primrose family known by the common names Drummond's beeblossom and scented gaura. It is native to Mexico, and its range extends into Texas. It can be found in parts of the southern and southwestern United States where it is an introduced species and is a minor weed in some areas. This is a mat-forming perennial herb growing from rhizomes. Stems reach 10 or 12 centimeters in height can be plentiful and tightly clumped. Leaves are about one to nine centimeters long and linear to slightly oval-shaped. The stems and foliage are covered in hairs. The plant produces small spike inflorescences with centimeter-long sepals and smaller spoon-shaped petals which are white, fading to pink. The fruit is an erect, woody capsule about a centimeter long with a base shaped like a stalk with a bulge at the center.

In 2007 W.L.Wagner & Hoch moved Gaura drummondii to the genus Oenothera. In the new genus, the name Oenothera drummondii was already occupied by Oenothera drummondii Hook. (1834), and Wagner & Hoch coined the nomen novum Oenothera xenogaura. In doing so, they overlooked the heterotypic synonym Gaura hispida Benth. (1849), which was an available name in Oenothera. In 2015 they corrected their mistake, and published the new combination Oenothera hispida (Benth.) W.L.Wagner, Hoch & Zarucchi.
