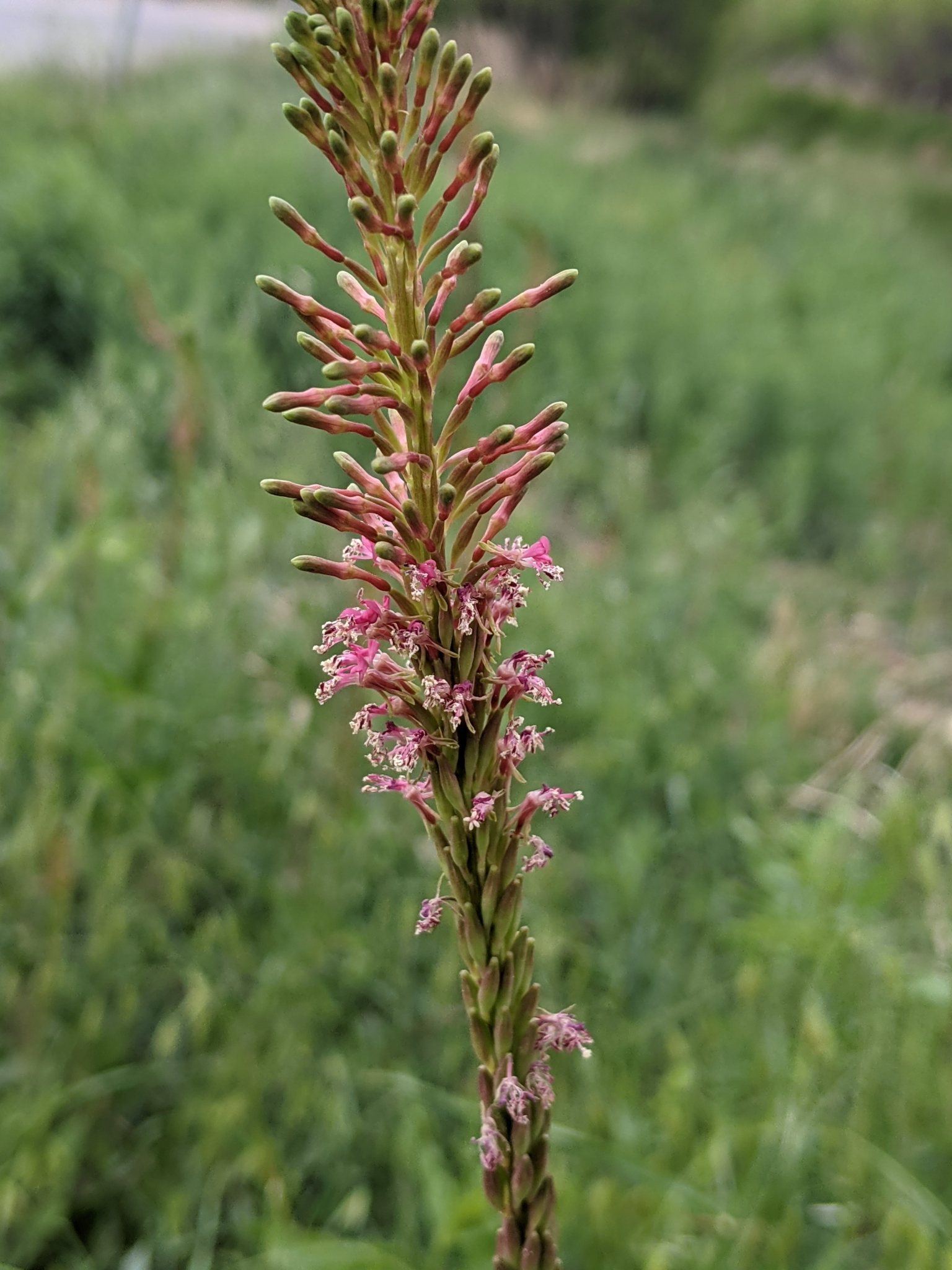

Conservation status
- Apparently Secure (NatureServe)

Scientific classification
- Kingdom: Plantae
- Clade: Tracheophytes
- Clade: Angiosperms
- Clade: Eudicots
- Clade: Rosids
- Order: Myrtales
- Family: Onagraceae
- Genus: Oenothera
- Species: O. curtiflora

Binomial name
- Oenothera curtiflora W.L.Wagner & Hoch

Synonyms
- List: Gaura australis; Gaura hirsuta; Gaura micrantha; Gaura mollis; Gaura parviflora; Schizocarya micrantha

= Oenothera curtiflora =

Plant species in the evening primrose family

Oenothera curtiflora (syn. Gaura parviflora), known as velvetweed, velvety gaura, downy gaura, or smallflower gaura, is a species of flowering plant native to the central United States and northern Mexico, from Nebraska and Wyoming south to Durango and Nuevo Leon.

== Taxonomy ==
Oenothera curtiflora was long known as Gaura parviflora, this name being published in 1830 and for a long time considered the correct name for the species. However, an overlooked but validly published name G. mollis had been published earlier by Edwin James in 1823. A proposal was made to conserve the name G. parviflora over G. mollis, and this was accepted by the International Botanical Congress Committee for Spermatophyta. In 2007 it was moved to the genus Oenothera by Warren Lambert Wagner and Peter Coonan Hoch as Oenothera curtiflora. The genus Gaura created by Carl Linnaeus in 1753 is a synonym of Oenothera according to Plants of the World Online (POWO).

Oenothera curtiflora has 9 synonyms, six of them species, according to POWO.

Table of Synonyms
| Name | Year | Rank | Notes |
|---|---|---|---|
| Gaura australis Griseb. | 1879 | species | = het. |
| Gaura hirsuta Scheele | 1848 | species | = het. |
| Gaura micrantha (Spach) D.Dietr. | 1840 | species | = het. |
| Gaura mollis E.James | 1823 | species | = het., nom. utique rej. |
| Gaura parviflora Douglas ex Lehm. | 1830 | species | ≡ hom. |
| Gaura parviflora var. typica Munz | 1938 | variety | ≡ hom. |
| Gaura parviflora f. glabra Munz | 1938 | form | = het. |
| Gaura parviflora var. lachnocarpa Weath. | 1925 | variety | = het. |
| Schizocarya micrantha Spach | 1835 | species | = het. |
Notes: ≡ homotypic synonym; = heterotypic synonym

== Description ==
It is an annual plant growing to 0.2–2 m (rarely 3 m) tall, unbranched, or if branched, only below the flower spikes. The leaves are 2–20 cm (0.79–7.87 in) long, lance-shaped, and are covered with soft hair. The flower spikes are 20–30 cm (7.9–11.8 in) long, covered with green flower buds, which open at night or before dawn with small flowers 5 mm (0.20 in) diameter with four pink petals.

== Uses ==
Among the Zuni people, fresh or dried root would be chewed by medicine man before sucking snakebite and poultice applied to wound.

== Introduction ==
It is naturalized and often invasive in other parts of the United States, and in Australia, China, Japan, and South America.
