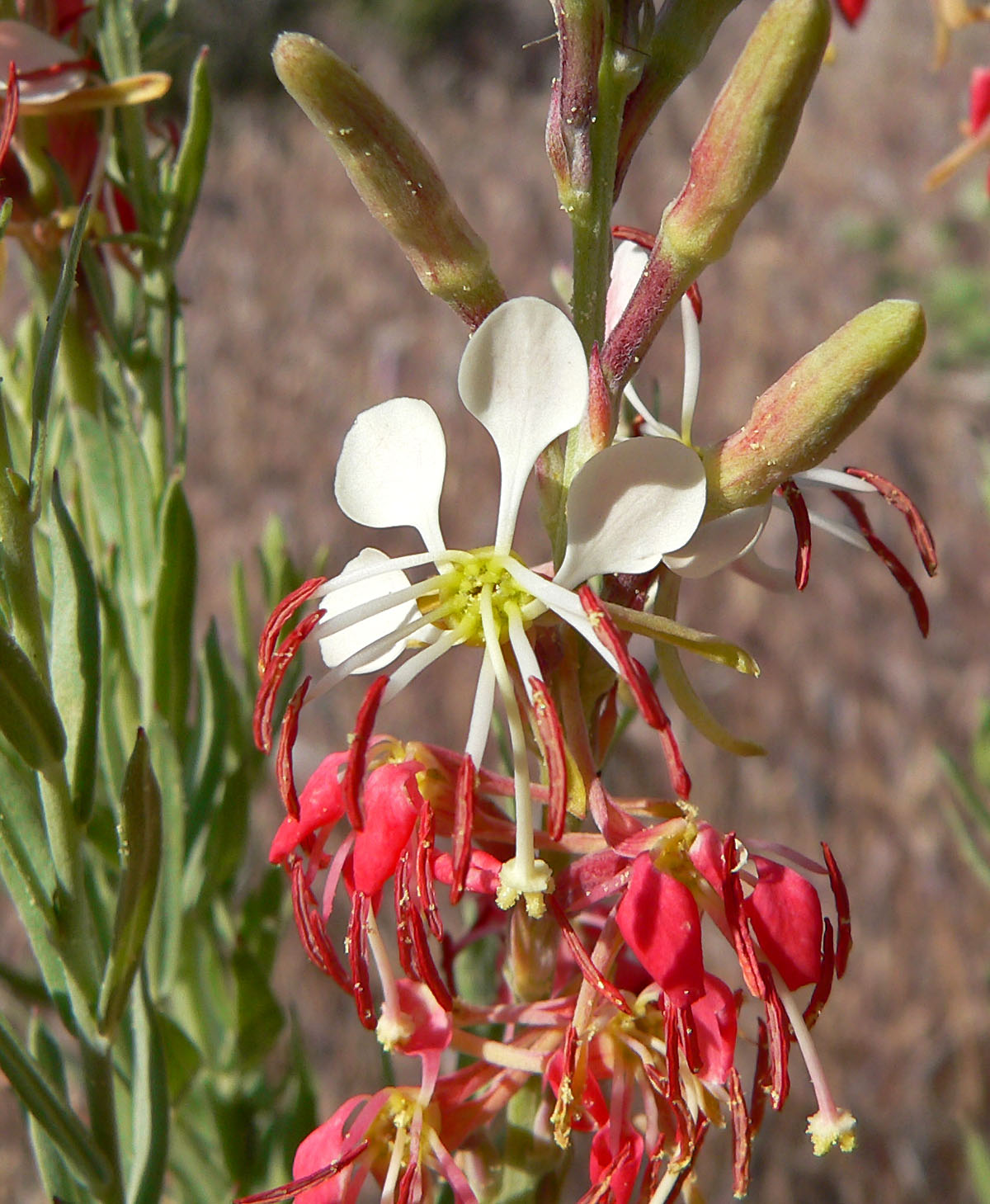

Conservation status
- Secure (NatureServe)

Scientific classification
- Kingdom: Plantae
- Clade: Tracheophytes
- Clade: Angiosperms
- Clade: Eudicots
- Clade: Rosids
- Order: Myrtales
- Family: Onagraceae
- Genus: Oenothera
- Species: O. suffrutescens

Binomial name
- Oenothera suffrutescens (Moc. & Sessé ex Ser.) W.L.Wagner & Hoch

Synonyms
- Gaura suffrutescens

= Oenothera suffrutescens =

Plant species in the evening primrose family

Oenothera suffrutescens (syn. Gaura coccinea) is a species of flowering plant in the evening primrose family known as scarlet beeblossom and scarlet gaura.

== Description ==
Scarlet beeblossom is a perennial herb growing from a woody base and heavy roots. The stems may reach anywhere from 10 centimeters in height to over a meter and sprawling, and they are often covered in small, stiff hairs. The thin to thick clumps of stems are covered in linear to somewhat oval-shaped leaves one to seven centimeters long. Atop the stems are spike inflorescences of several flowers each. The flower has four long, stiff sepals which open and fall away from the flower to lie reflexed toward the stem. There are four spoon-shaped petals which are white to yellowish and may turn pink with age. Each flower has eight long stamens with large red, pink, or yellowish anthers arranged around a long stigma. The flowers are strongly scented. The fruit is a woody capsule under a centimeter long.

== Taxonomy ==
The name Oenothera suffrutescens was created in 2007 when Gaura suffrutescens was moved to the genus Oenothera by Warren Lambert Wagner and Peter Coonan Hoch. It is classified in the family Onagraceae. It has no accepted subspecies, but it has 20 synonyms according to Plants of the World Online.

Table of Synonyms
Name	Year	Rank	Notes
Gaura bracteata Ser.	1828	species	= het.
Gaura coccinea Nutt. ex Pursh	1813	species	= het.
Gaura coccinea var. arizonica Munz	1938	variety	= het.
Gaura coccinea var. epilobioides (Kunth) Munz	1938	variety	= het.
Gaura coccinea var. glabra (Lehm.) Torr. & A.Gray ex Munz	1938	variety	= het.
Gaura coccinea var. integerrima Torr.	1827	variety	= het.
Gaura coccinea var. parvifolia Rickett	1934	variety	= het.
Gaura coccinea var. parvifolia (Torr.) F.C.Gates	1939	variety	= het.
Gaura coccinea var. typica Munz	1939	variety	= het., not validly publ.
Gaura epilobioides Kunth	1823	species	= het.
Gaura glabra Lehm.	1830	species	= het.
Gaura induta Wooton & Standl.	1913	species	= het.
Gaura linearis Wooton & Standl.	1913	species	= het.
Gaura marginata Lehm.	1832	species	= het.
Gaura multicaulis Raf.	1832	species	= het.
Gaura odorata Lag.	1816	species	= het.
Gaura parvifolia Torr.	1827	species	= het.
Gaura spicata Sessé & Moc.	1888	species	= het.
Gaura suffrutescens Moc. & Sessé ex Ser.	1828	species	≡ hom.
Schizocarya kunthii Spach	1835	species	= het., nom. superfl.
Notes: ≡ homotypic synonym; = heterotypic synonym

== Distribution ==
The plant is native to much of North America, especially the western and central sections. It can be found in many habitats and is occasionally seen in urban areas. In 2016 NatureServe assessed Oenothera suffrutescens under the name Gaura coccinea as globally secure (G5).

== Cultivation ==
Scarlet beeblossom is occasionally grown in wildflower gardens for the resemblance of its flowers to butterflies and the pleaseant scent they produce when blooming. However, some like the author Claude A. Barr dislike that it spreads by deep rhizomes making it difficult to control in a garden setting.
