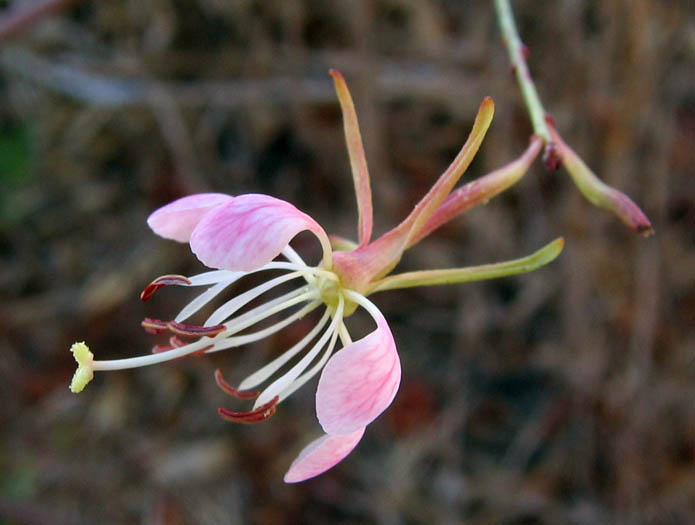

Conservation status
- Apparently Secure (NatureServe)

Scientific classification
- Kingdom: Plantae
- Clade: Tracheophytes
- Clade: Angiosperms
- Clade: Eudicots
- Clade: Rosids
- Order: Myrtales
- Family: Onagraceae
- Genus: Oenothera
- Species: O. sinuosa

Binomial name
- Oenothera sinuosa W.L.Wagner & Hoch

Synonyms
- Gaura sinuata Nutt. ex Ser.

= Oenothera sinuosa =

Plant species in the evening primrose family

Oenothera sinuosa is a species of flowering plant in the evening primrose family known by the common names wavyleaf beeblossom and Red River gaura. The species was previously treated as Gaura sinuata, but in 2007 the species, along with the genus Gaura was reclassified in the genus Oenothera. This species then becomes O. sinuosa in Oenothera Section Gaura.

It is native to Mexico and its native range extends as far north into the United States as Oklahoma. It can be found across the southern half of the United States where it is an introduced species and occasionally weedy. This is a tough mat-forming perennial herb with branching, sprawling stems 20 to 60 centimeters long and covered in hairs. The leaves are 1 to 10 centimeters long and are generally toothed along the edges. The plant produces spike inflorescences of small flowers with white to pinkish spoon-shaped petals which darken as they age, often to a deep red. The fruit is a winged, woody capsule with a tapered end, up to 1.5 centimeters in length.

The species is tetraploid, probably of hybrid origin. Its potential for invasive spread through seed is limited by its self-incompatibility.
