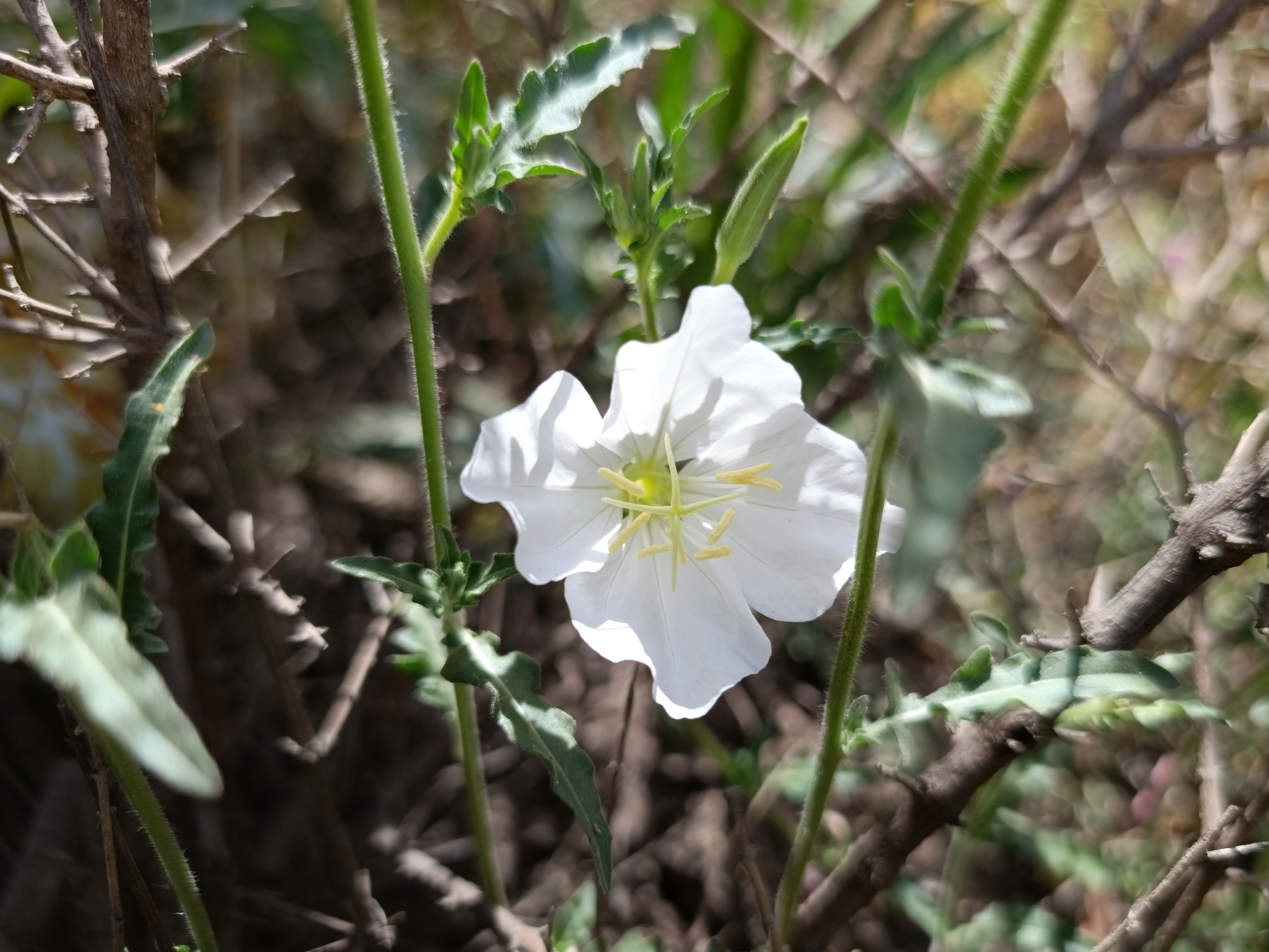

Scientific classification
- Kingdom: Plantae
- Clade: Tracheophytes
- Clade: Angiosperms
- Clade: Eudicots
- Clade: Rosids
- Order: Myrtales
- Family: Onagraceae
- Genus: Oenothera
- Species: O. kunthiana

Binomial name
- Oenothera kunthiana (Spach) Munz

Synonyms
- List: Hartmannia domingensis Urb. & Ekman; Hartmannia kunthiana Spach; Hartmannia parviflora Spach; Oenothera actopanensis F.Dietr.; Oenothera coronopifolia A.Gray; Oenothera domingensis (Urb. & Ekman) Munz; Oenothera fissifolia Steud.; Oenothera humboldtii Engelm.; Oenothera micrantha Walp.; Oenothera pinnatifida Kunth; Oenothera purshiana Steud.; Oenothera walpersii Donn.Sm.

= Oenothera kunthiana =

Species of plant

Oenothera kunthiana, Kunth's evening primrose, is a species of flowering plant in the family Onagraceae. It is native to southern Texas, Mexico, Central America, and Hispaniola, and it has been introduced to Hawaii. It is an annual reaching 40 cm (16 in).
