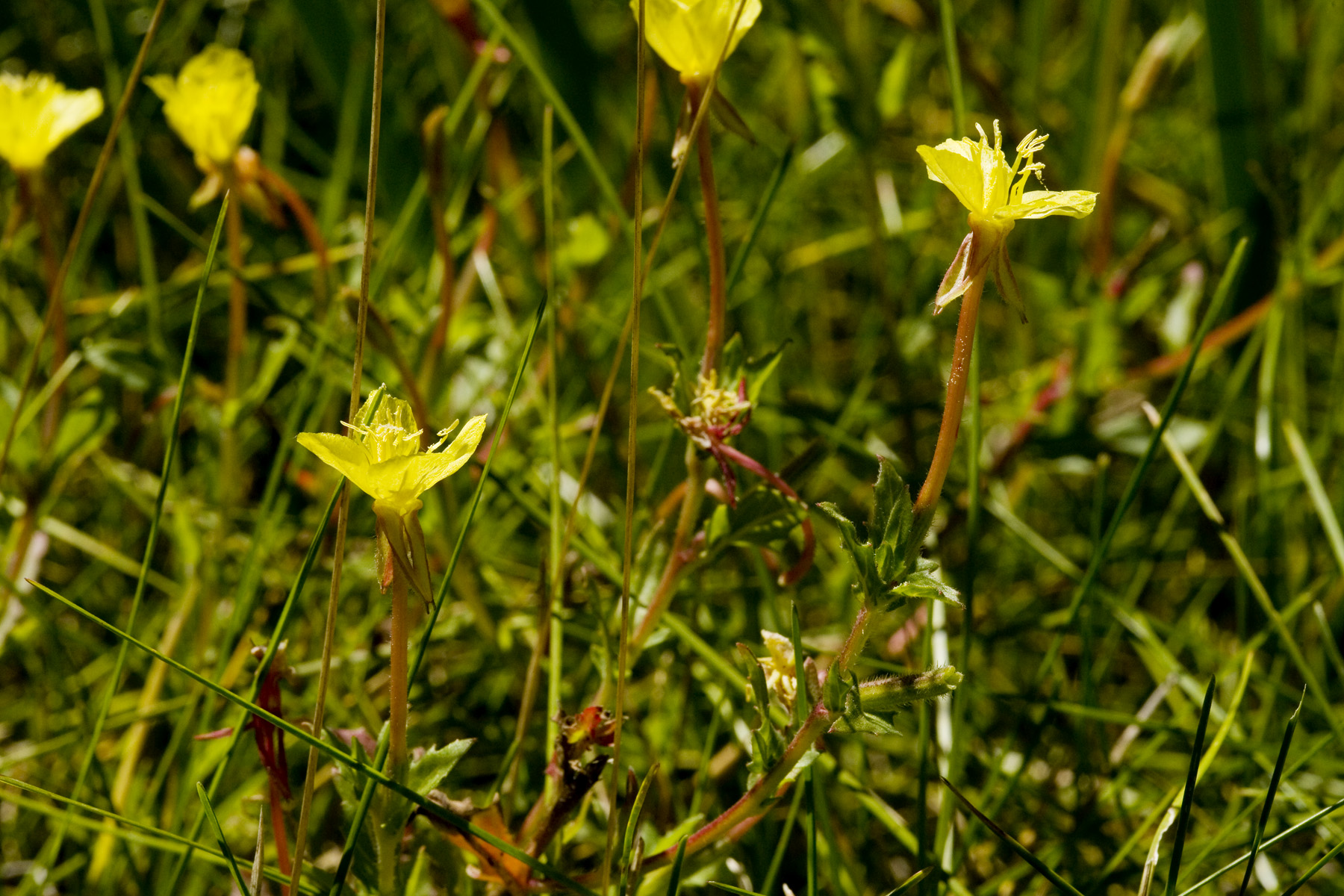

Scientific classification
- Kingdom: Plantae
- Clade: Tracheophytes
- Clade: Angiosperms
- Clade: Eudicots
- Clade: Rosids
- Order: Myrtales
- Family: Onagraceae
- Genus: Oenothera
- Species: O. pubescens

Binomial name
- Oenothera pubescens Willd. ex Spreng.

Synonyms
- O. laciniata spp. pubescens (Willd. ex Spreng.) Munz

= Oenothera pubescens =

South American evening-primrose

Species of plant

Oenothera pubescens, known commonly as the South American evening-primrose, is a plant in the evening primrose family native to the Southwestern U.S. (southeastern California, Arizona, New Mexico, and western Texas); Mexico (more than 20 states); Guatemala; and Western South America (Colombia, Ecuador, and Peru). It is used locally in folk medicine.
