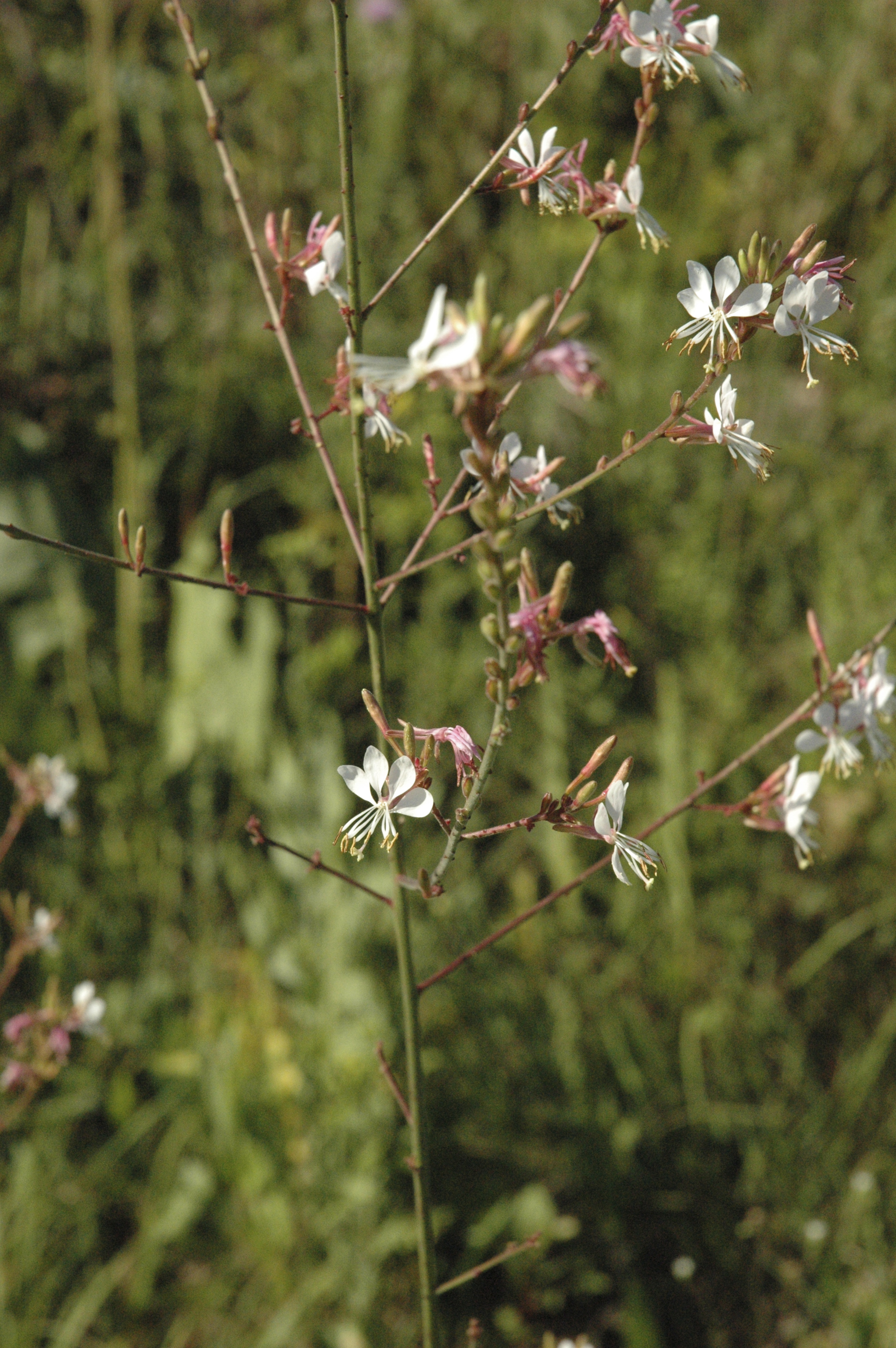
- Flowering gaura at the James Woodworth Prairie Preserve

Scientific classification
- Kingdom: Plantae
- Clade: Tracheophytes
- Clade: Angiosperms
- Clade: Eudicots
- Clade: Rosids
- Order: Myrtales
- Family: Onagraceae
- Genus: Oenothera
- Species: O. gaura

Binomial name
- Oenothera gaura W.L.Wagner & Hoch

Synonyms
- Gaura biennis L.; Gaura pitcheri Small; Gaura pitcheri Pickering ex Torr. & A.Gray

= Oenothera gaura =

Species of flowering plant

Oenothera gaura, formerly known as Gaura biennis, the biennial gaura or biennial beeblossom, is a North American flowering plant that can reach 6 ft (1.8 m) in height at maturity. Its upper half is made up of flowering stems, which are covered with soft, white hairs. It has light pink colored flowers, which turn a vibrant red/pink color in the late summer to early fall seasons (typically August to September). These colors make this plant attractive to butterflies and bees, and are in full bloom just before many fall plant species begin to bloom.

Research has been done in order to test the hybridization between different species of the section Oenothera sect. Gaura and to describe why many members of this group are so similar morphologically. According to Carr et al., readily crossbreeds with Gaura longiflora (now called Oenothera filiformis), and showed it is a direct derivative from G. longiflora, but the specialized feature of permanent translocation heterozygosity set Oenothera gaura apart as a unique genetic system amongst the genus.

== Distribution ==
Biennial gaura naturally occurs throughout eastern and central North America, and extends as far north as Quebec, Canada. Some of the states in the U.S. it can be found in include: Connecticut, Delaware, Georgia, Illinois, Kentucky, Massachusetts, North Carolina, South Carolina, New York, Texas, and Virginia.

== Description ==
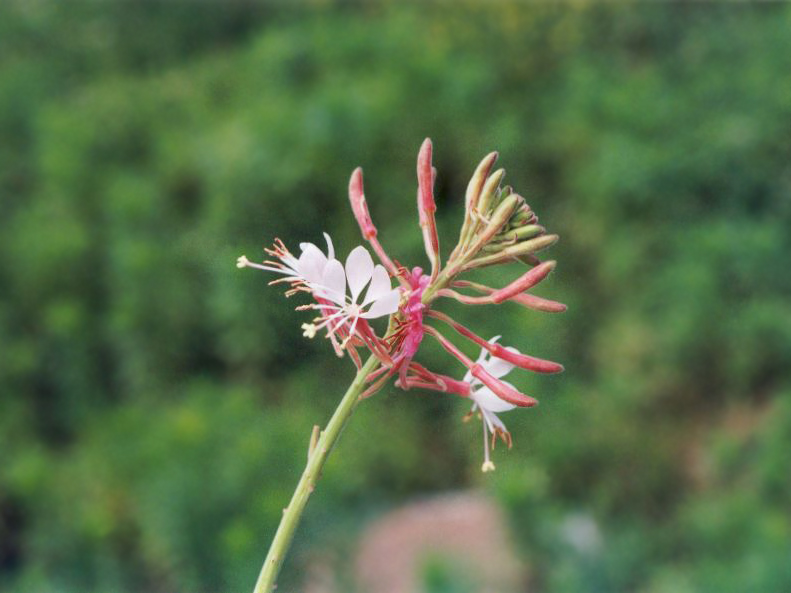
Flowers

Individuals of this species are tall and weedy, with white to light pink flowers during blooming season, and leaves that turn a red color when mature. The flimsy makeup of the plant allows it to sway in the wind, which makes seed dispersal easier. A few hair-covered stems exit from the top of the plant where the flowers grow, which is the easiest way to tell that the species is the biennial beeblossom. Flowers usually have 4 petals, 8 stamens, and 1 pistil. It starts as a small plant, but grows anywhere from 0.9–1.8 m (3–6 feet) during its second year.

The flowers are attractive white to light pink color. They have 4 petals, 8 stamens, and 1 pistil, which are mostly pollinated by bees and other insects. The fruits are capsules, ribbed or ridged, and are occasionally woody. It produces small seeds that are easily dispersed by wind and other methods.

== Habitat and ecology ==
Oenothera gaura is a biennial plant, meaning it completes its life cycle over the course of two growing seasons, in which it will usually reach full maturity towards the end of the second growing season. It lives mostly in prairies throughout North America, and in dry, rocky places and deserts. It prefers sunny, dry areas, but has the capability of adapting to a wide range of habitats because of its ability to grow deep roots. In order to survive wet winters, it needs a dry spot in light soil.
