= Oenothera dodgeniana =

Conservation status
- Vulnerable (NatureServe)

Scientific classification
- Kingdom: Plantae
- Clade: Tracheophytes
- Clade: Angiosperms
- Clade: Eudicots
- Clade: Rosids
- Order: Myrtales
- Family: Onagraceae
- Genus: Oenothera
- Species: O. dodgeniana

Binomial name
- Oenothera dodgeniana Krakos & W.L.Wagner

Synonyms
- Gaura neomexicana Wooton; Gaura neomexicana var. typica Munz; Oenothera coloradensis subsp. neomexicana (Wooton) W.L.Wagner & Hoch

Species of flowering plant

Oenothera dodgeniana is a species of flowering plant in the evening primrose family known by the common names New Mexico beeblossom or New Mexico gaura. It is native to the west central United States.
