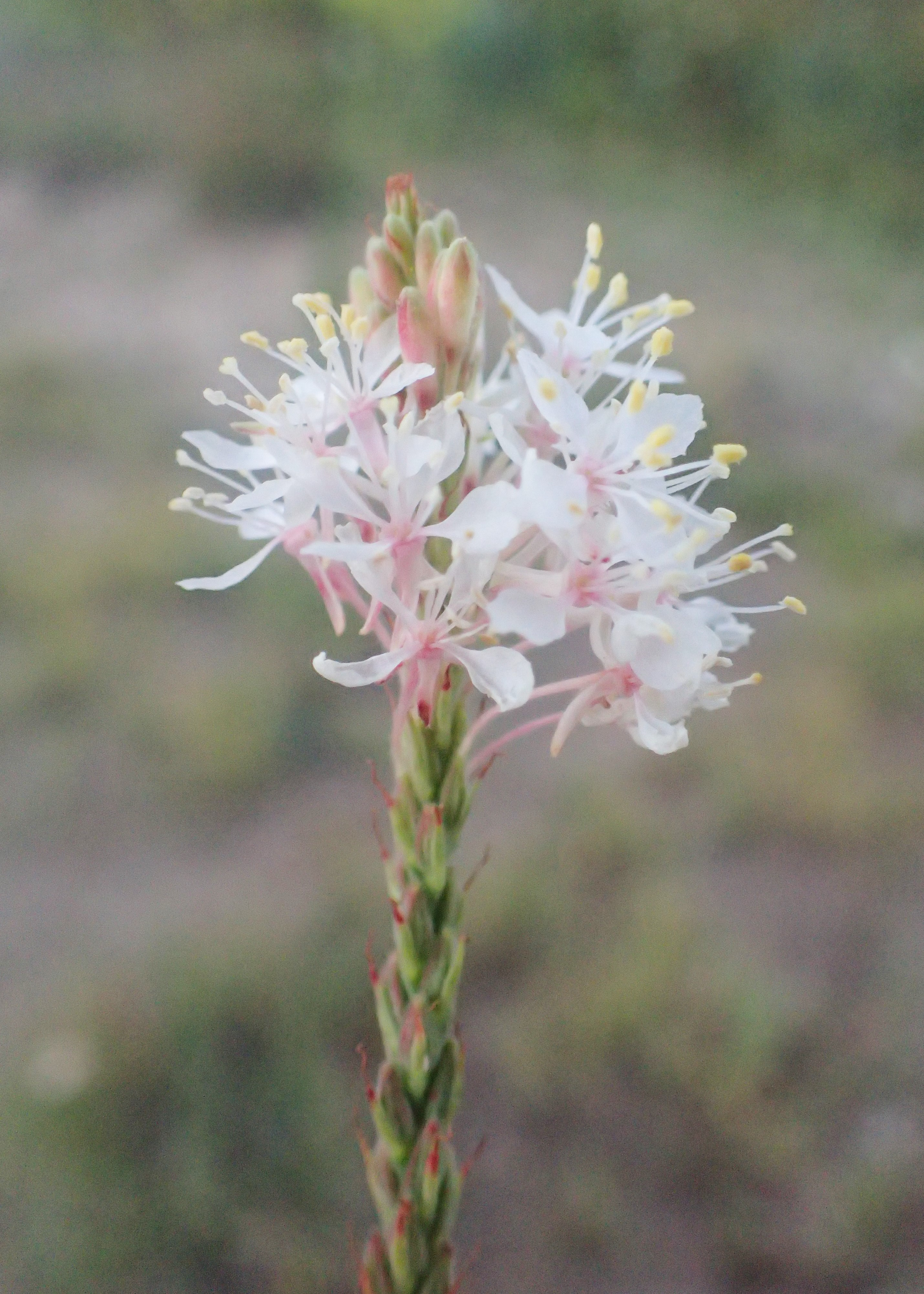
- Raceme
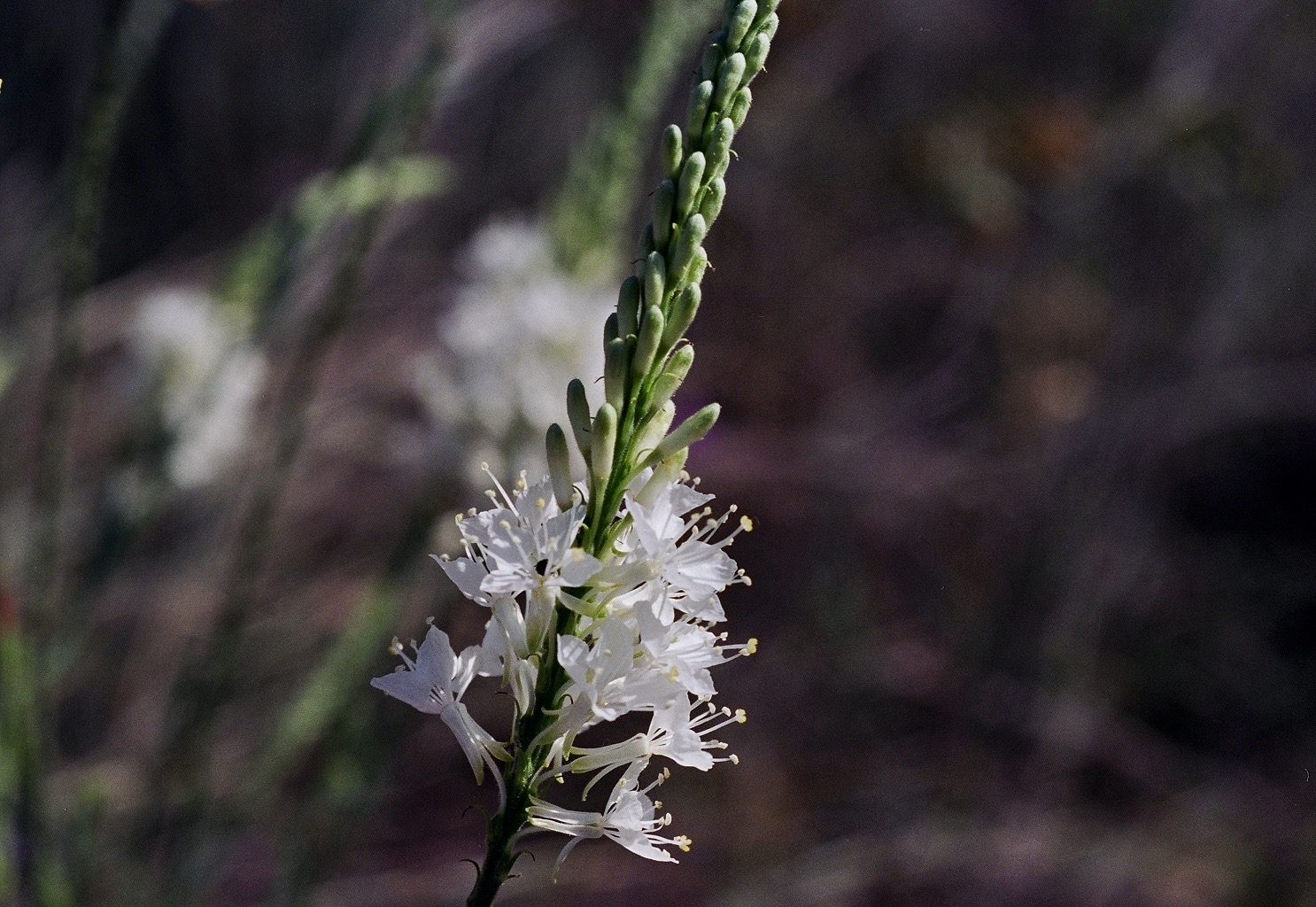
- At the Fort Worth Nature Center and Refuge

Conservation status
- Secure (NatureServe)

Scientific classification
- Kingdom: Plantae
- Clade: Tracheophytes
- Clade: Angiosperms
- Clade: Eudicots
- Clade: Rosids
- Order: Myrtales
- Family: Onagraceae
- Genus: Oenothera
- Species: O. glaucifolia

Binomial name
- Oenothera glaucifolia W.L.Wagner & Hoch

Synonyms
- Antogoeringia linifolia Kuntze; Gaura linifolia Nutt. ex E.James; Stenosiphon bracteatus M.E.Jones ex Johans.; Stenosiphon linifolium (Nutt. ex E.James) Heynh.; Stenosiphon virgatum Spach

= Oenothera glaucifolia =

Plant species in the evening primrose family

Oenothera glaucifolia, the false gaura, is a species of flowering plant in the family Onagraceae. It is native to the west-central United States, and to Coahuila in Mexico. A probable biennial, it can reach 3 m (10 ft).
