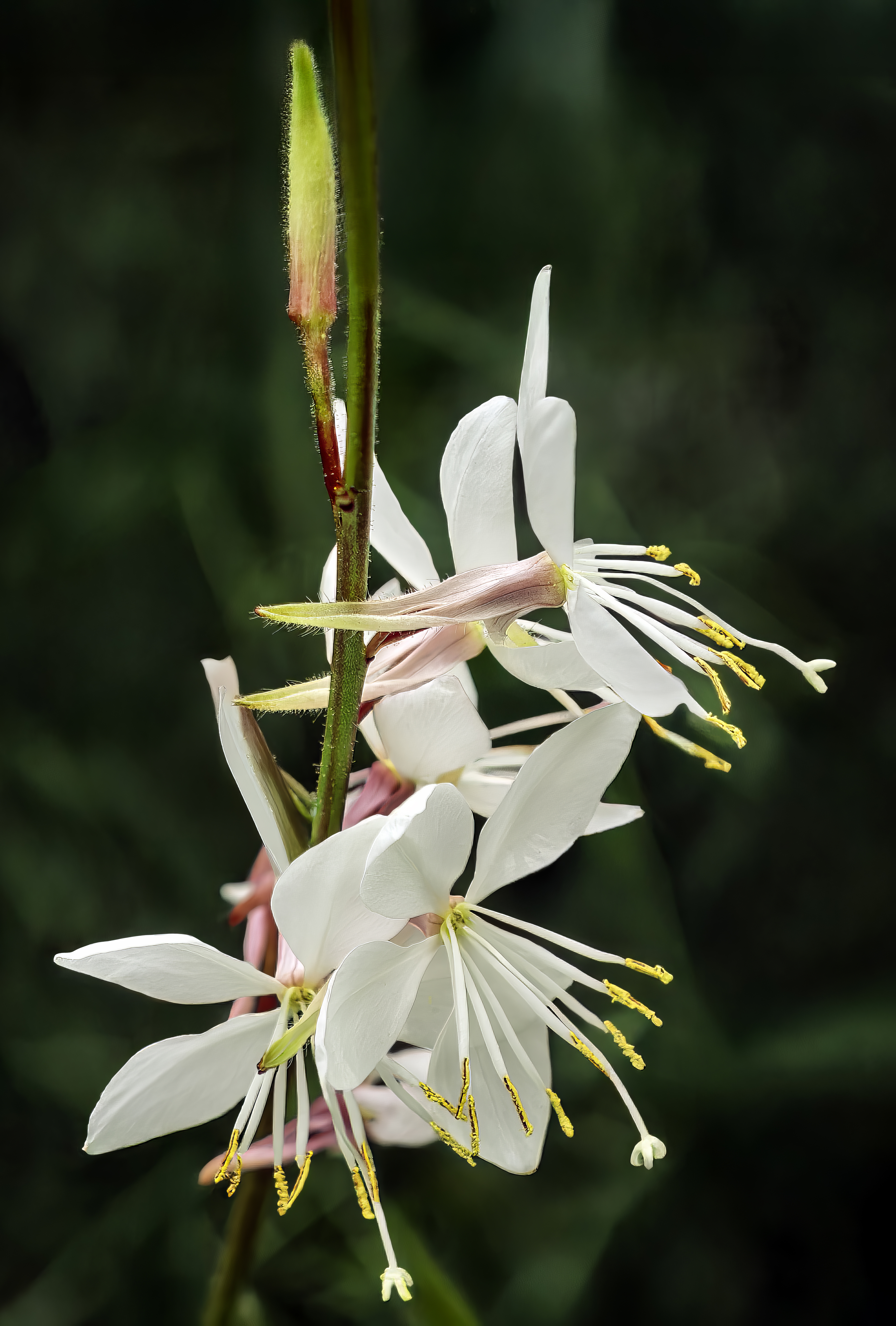
- Inflorescence

Scientific classification
- Kingdom: Plantae
- Clade: Embryophytes
- Clade: Tracheophytes
- Clade: Angiosperms
- Clade: Eudicots
- Clade: Rosids
- Order: Myrtales
- Family: Onagraceae
- Genus: Oenothera
- Species: O. lindheimeri

Binomial name
- Oenothera lindheimeri (Engelm. & A.Gray) W.L.Wagner & Hoch

Synonyms
- Gaura filiformis var. munzii Cory; Gaura lindheimeri Engelm. & A.Gray

= Oenothera lindheimeri =

Species of flowering plant

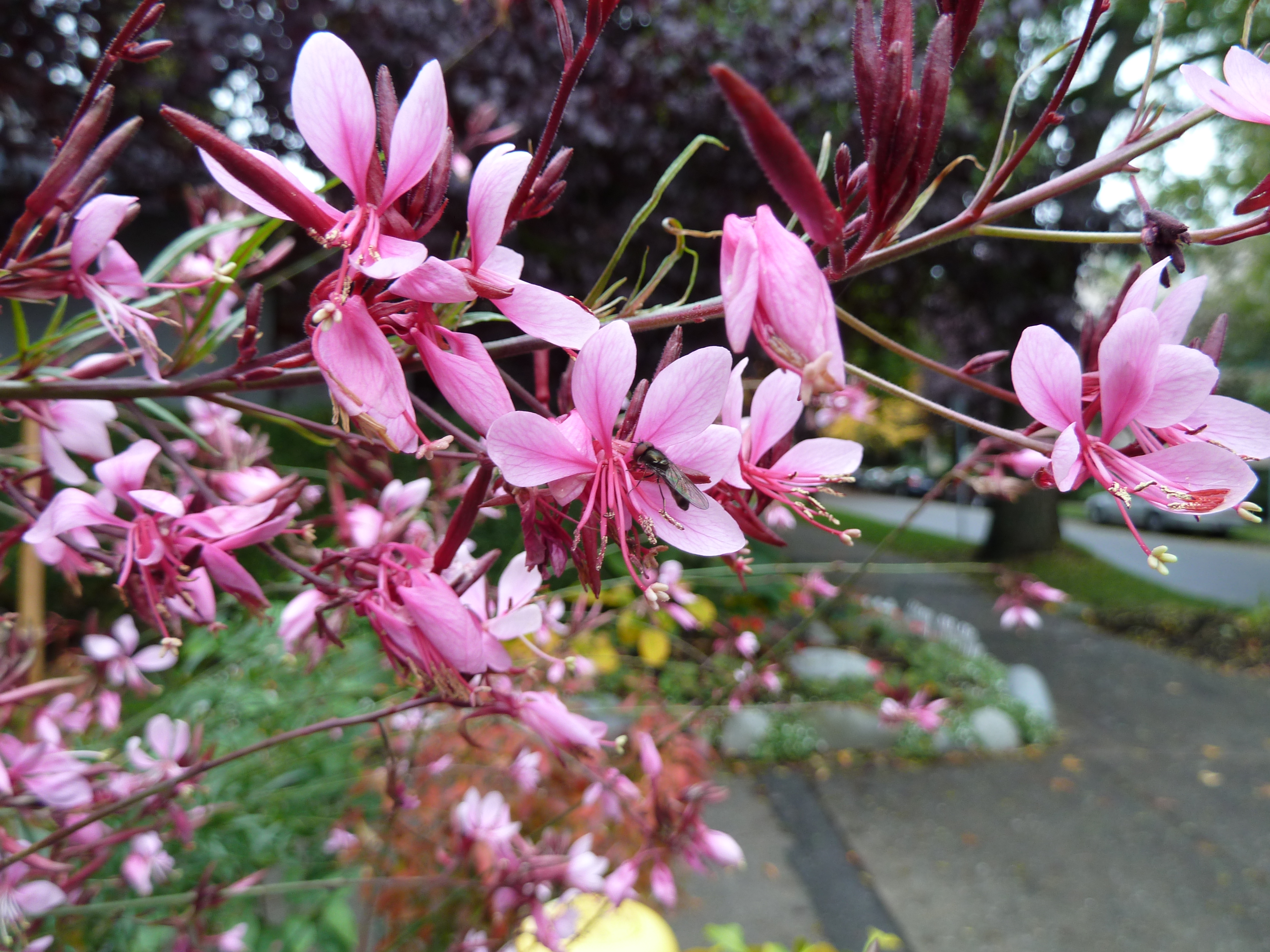
Oenothera lindheimeri 'Siskiyou Pink'

Oenothera lindheimeri, commonly known as Lindheimer's beeblossom, white gaura, pink gaura, Lindheimer's clockweed, and Indian feather, is a species of Oenothera. Several of its common names derive from the genus Gaura, in which this species was formerly placed.

The perennial plant is native to southern Louisiana and Texas. The specific epithet is after Ferdinand Jacob Lindheimer, a German-American botanist who extensively studied the plants of Texas for Harvard University professor Asa Gray. It is somewhat commonly grown as an ornamental plant in North America.

== Description ==
Oenothera lindheimeri is a perennial herbaceous plant growing to 50 to 150 centimeters (20–60 in) tall, with densely clustered branched stems growing from an underground rhizome. The leaves are finely hairy, lanceolate, 1 to 9 cm (1/2–3 1/2 in) long and 1 to 13 mm (1/16–1/2 in) broad, with a coarsely toothed margin.

The flowers are produced on a 10-to-80-centimeter-long (5–30 in) inflorescence; they are pink or white, 2 to 3 cm (3/4–1 1/4 in) in diameter, with four petals 10 to 15 mm (3/8–5/8 in) long and long hairlike stamens, and are produced from the beginning of spring until the first frost.

== Cultivation ==
Oenothera lindheimeri is an ornamental plant. It is used in either garden beds or pots. It grows best in full sun and can survive lengthy periods of drought.

Several cultivars have been selected for varying flower color, from nearly pure white in 'Whirling Butterflies' to darker pink in 'Cherry Brandy' and 'Siskiyou Pink'. In some cultivars, the petals are white at dawn then turn pink before falling off at dusk.

Although a perennial rated USDA Zone 6-9 for hardiness it may not overwinter reliably, and is often treated as an annual. In colder climates a heavy winter mulch is necessary.

This plant has gained the Royal Horticultural Society's Award of Garden Merit.

== Etymology ==
Oenothera: Etymology is uncertain, but it is believed to be derived from the Greek phrase οίνος θήρα (oinos thera) meaning "wine seeker".

Gaura: Derived from Greek γαῦρος (gaûros) meaning "superb". Named in reference to the stature and floral display of some species in this genus.

Lindheimeri: The plant is named for German-American botanist Ferdinand Lindheimer (1801–79).
