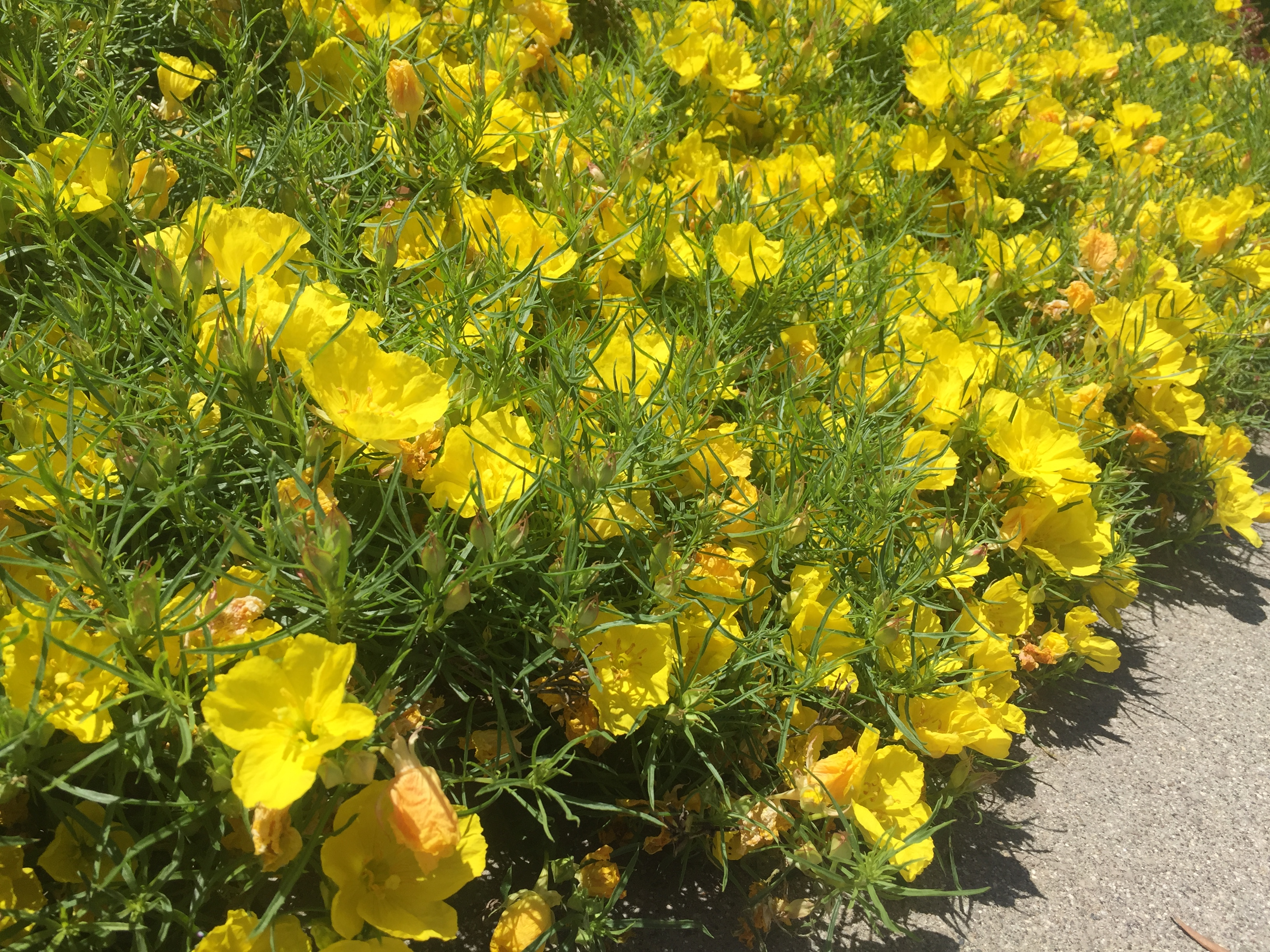
- At the Huntington Library, Art Museum and Botanical Gardens
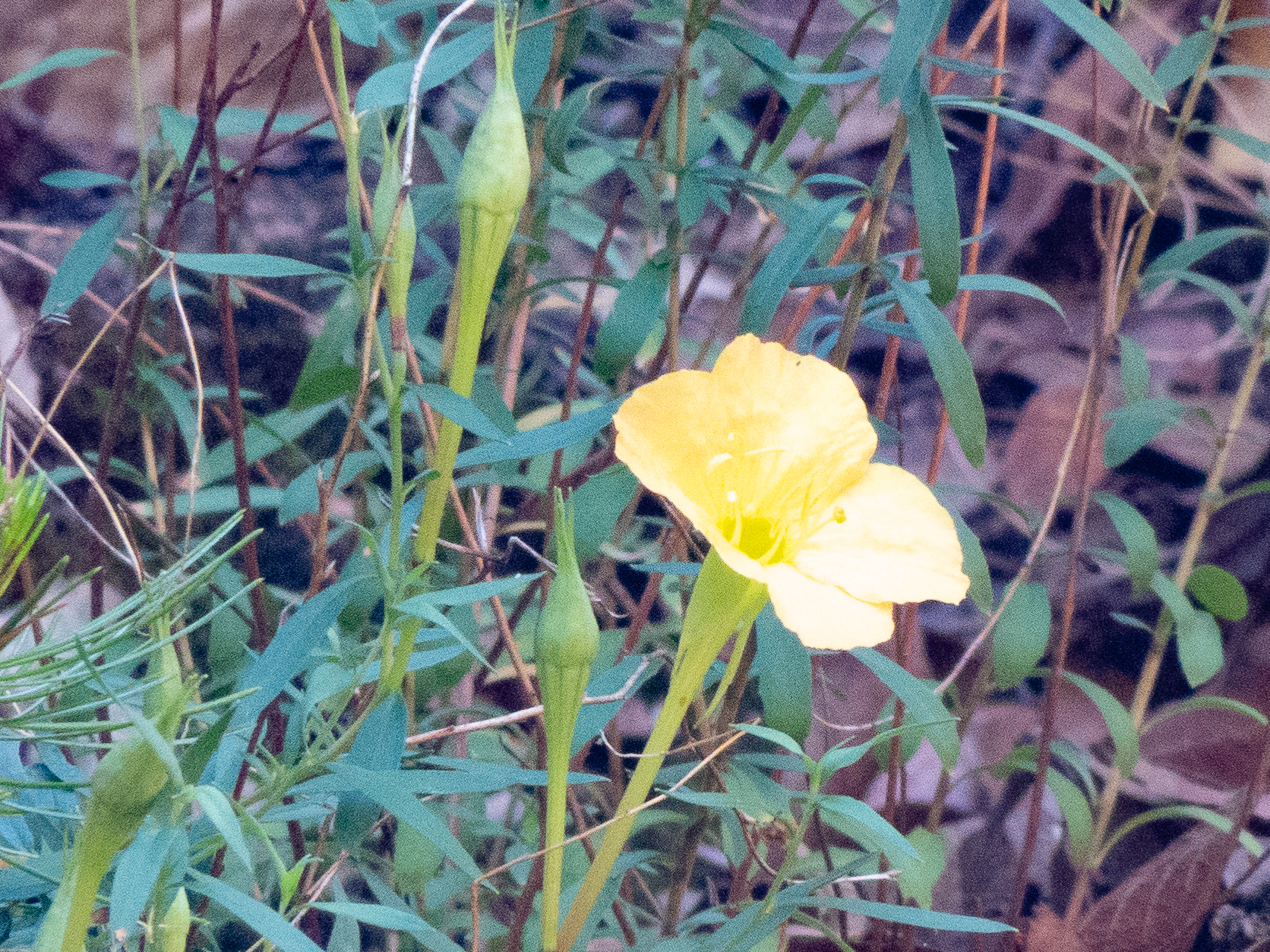
- Near Sierra Vista, Arizona

Conservation status
- Apparently Secure (NatureServe)

Scientific classification
- Kingdom: Plantae
- Clade: Tracheophytes
- Clade: Angiosperms
- Clade: Eudicots
- Clade: Rosids
- Order: Myrtales
- Family: Onagraceae
- Genus: Oenothera
- Species: O. hartwegii

Binomial name
- Oenothera hartwegii Benth.

Synonyms
- List: Calylophus hartwegii (Benth.) P.H.Raven; Calylophus hartwegii subsp. fendleri (A.Gray) Towner & Raven; Calylophus hartwegii subsp. filifolia (Eastw.) Towner & Raven; Calylophus hartwegii var. filifolia (Eastw.) Munz; Calylophus hartwegii var. maccartii Shinners; Calylophus hartwegii subsp. maccartii (Shinners) Towner & Raven; Calylophus hartwegii var. pubescens (A.Gray) Shinners; Calylophus hartwegii subsp. pubescens (A.Gray) Towner & Raven; Galpinsia camporum Wooton & Standl.; Galpinsia fendleri (A.Gray) A.Heller; Galpinsia filifolia (Eastw.) A.Heller; Galpinsia greggii (A.Gray) Small; Galpinsia hartwegii (Benth.) Britton; Galpinsia hartwegii var. fendleri (A.Gray) Small; Galpinsia interior Small; Galpinsia lampasana (Buckley) Wooton & Standl.; Galpinsia lavandulifolia var. glandulosa (Munz) Moldenke; Oenothera camporum (Wooton & Standl.) Tidestr.; Oenothera fendleri A.Gray; Oenothera filifolia (Eastw.) Tidestr.; Oenothera greggii A.Gray; Oenothera greggii var. lampasana (Buckley) Munz; Oenothera greggii var. pringlei Munz; Oenothera greggii var. pubescens A.Gray; Oenothera greggii var. typica Munz; Oenothera hartwegii subvar. filifolia (Eastw.) H.Lév.; Oenothera hartwegii var. filifolia (Eastw.) Munz; Oenothera hartwegii var. fendleri (A.Gray) A.Gray; Oenothera hartwegii var. pubescens (A.Gray) Allred; Oenothera hartwegii f. thymifolia H.Lév.; Oenothera hartwegii var. typica Munz; Oenothera interior (Small) G.W.Stevens; Oenothera lampasana Buckley; Oenothera lavandulifolia var. glandulosa Munz; Oenothera pringlei (Munz) Munz; Oenothera tubicula var. filifolia Eastw.; Salpingia hartwegii (Benth.) Raim.

= Oenothera hartwegii =

Plant species in the evening primrose family

Oenothera hartwegii (syn. Calylophus hartwegii), Hartweg's sundrops, is a species of flowering plant in the evening primrose family Onagraceae. It is native to the desert southwest of the United States, and to northern and western Mexico. A perennial usually 30 to 45 cm (12 to 18 in) tall and 60 cm (24 in) wide, it is used locally as a drought-resistant ground cover.

== Subtaxa ==
The following subspecies are accepted:

- Oenothera hartwegii subsp. fendleri (A.Gray) W.L.Wagner & Hoch – Arizona, New Mexico, Kansas, Oklahoma, Texas, northeastern Mexico
- Oenothera hartwegii subsp. filifolia (Eastw.) W.L.Wagner & Hoch – New Mexico, Texas, northeastern Mexico
- Oenothera hartwegii subsp. hartwegii – Colorado, Texas, northern and western Mexico
- Oenothera hartwegii subsp. maccartii (Shinners) W.L.Wagner & Hoch – Texas, northeastern Mexico
- Oenothera hartwegii subsp. pubescens (A.Gray) W.L.Wagner & Hoch – Arizona, New Mexico, Colorado, Kansas, Oklahoma, Texas, northeastern Mexico
