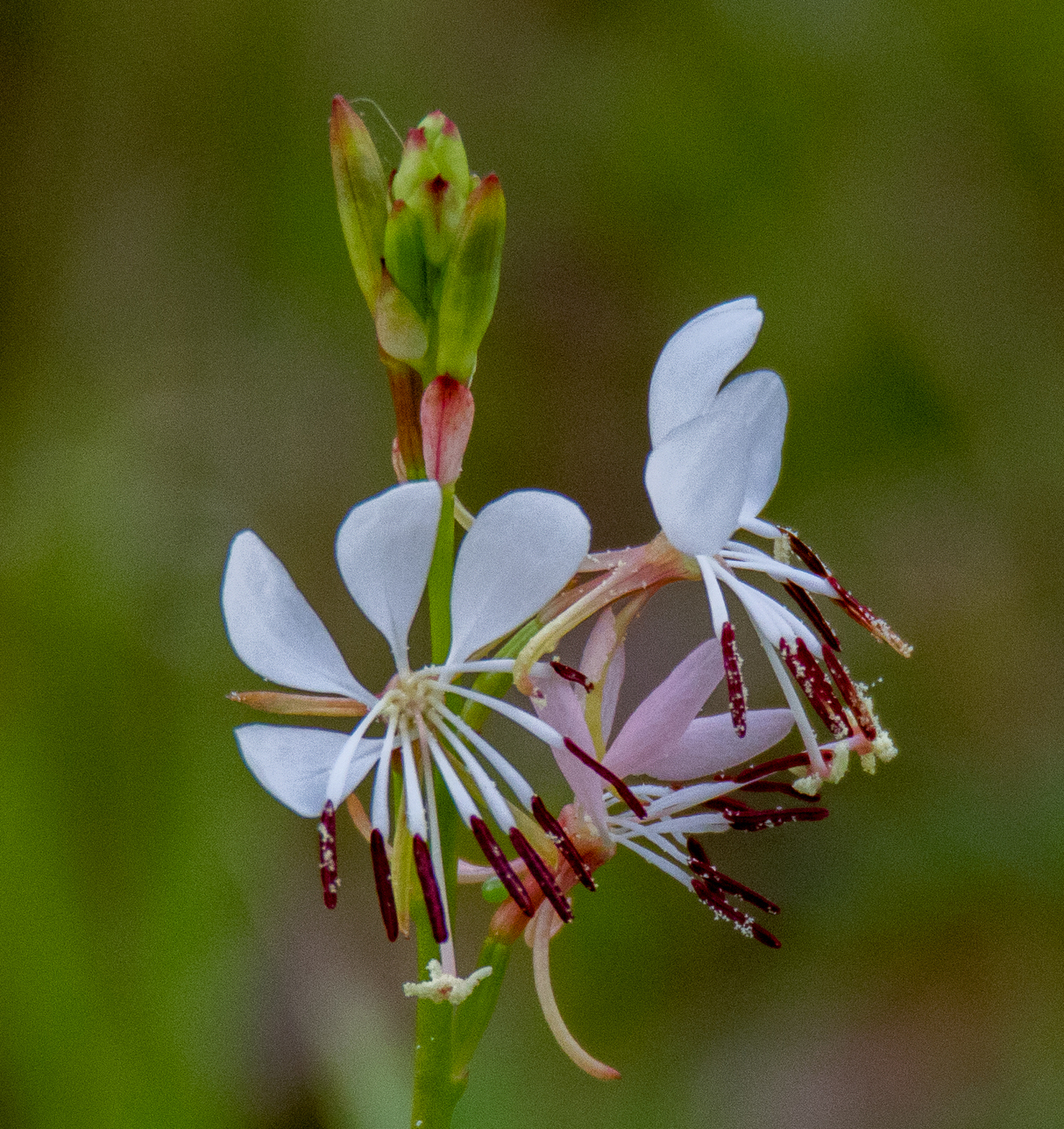
- In Denton County, Texas

Scientific classification
- Kingdom: Plantae
- Clade: Tracheophytes
- Clade: Angiosperms
- Clade: Eudicots
- Clade: Rosids
- Order: Myrtales
- Family: Onagraceae
- Genus: Oenothera
- Section: O. sect. Gaura
- Species: O. suffulta

Binomial name
- Oenothera suffulta (Engelm.) W.L.Wagner & Hoch

= Oenothera suffulta =

Species of plant

Oenothera suffulta, known as roadside gaura, honeysuckle gaura, or kisses, is a flowering plant in the primrose family, Onagraceae. It is endemic to the United States, in Texas (excluding the Trans-Pecos) and southern Oklahoma.

== Taxonomy ==
Roadside gaura was first formally named in 1850 as Gaura suffulta. It was transferred to the genus Oenothera in 2007.

It is most closely related to Oenothera patriciae and Oenothera triangulata.

== Description ==
Oenothera suffulta is an annual herb, of open, sandy places. It grows up to 120 cm (3.9 ft) tall. The basal leaves form a rosette; each leaf is up to 11 cm (4.3 in) long and 2.3 cm (0.91 in) across. The stem leaves (cauline leaves) are alternate, simple, and range from 1–9 cm (0.4–3.5 in) long, with smooth, wavy, or toothed edges. The lower leaf surface is softly, velvety hairy.

Roadside gaura flowers from April to June. Each plant produces a spike of closely packed flowers; several flowers open each day, around sunset. The flowers are relatively scentless. The flower has four long, white petals, each petal 10–15 mm (0.4–0.6 in) long and narrowed at the base. The fruit is a woody, indehiscent capsule with broad wings on the angles.
