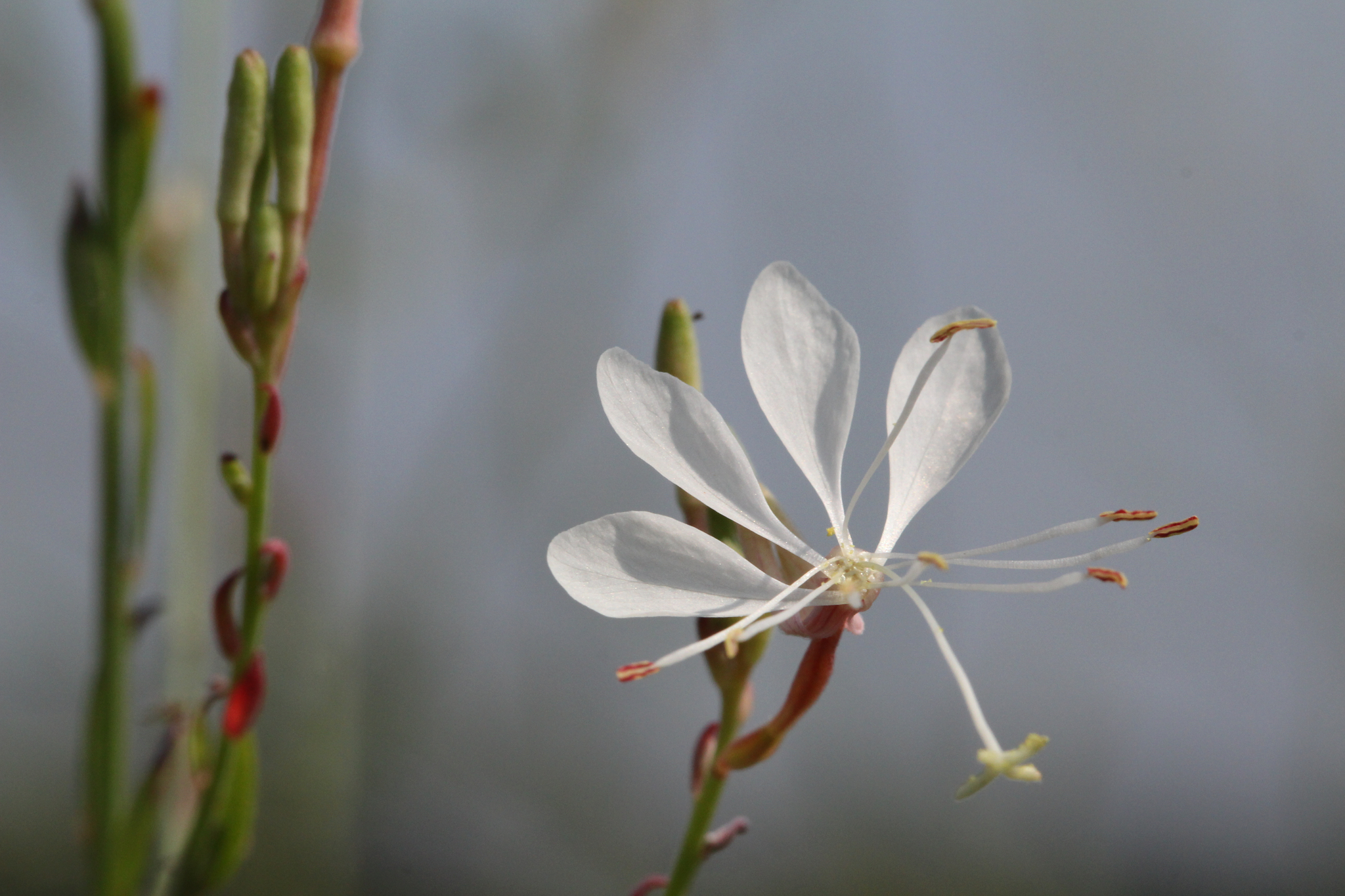
- Longflower beeblossom in Oktibbeha County, Mississippi

Conservation status
- Apparently Secure (NatureServe)

Scientific classification
- Kingdom: Plantae
- Clade: Tracheophytes
- Clade: Angiosperms
- Clade: Eudicots
- Clade: Rosids
- Order: Myrtales
- Family: Onagraceae
- Genus: Oenothera
- Species: O. filiformis

Binomial name
- Oenothera filiformis (Small) W.L.Wagner & Hoch

Synonyms
- List: Gaura exaltata; Gaura filiformis; Gaura longiflora

= Oenothera filiformis =

Plant species in the evening primrose family

Oenothera filiformis, the longflower beeblossom, is a species of flowering plant in the family Onagraceae. It is native to the central United States. An annual, biennial, or perennial, it can reach 12 ft (3.7 m) tall. It has simple leaves that are alternate in arrangement. Flowers have four petals that are white or pink to red in color.

== Taxonomy ==
Oenothera filiformis was scientifically described John Kunkel Small in 1898 and named Gaura filiformis. In 2007 it was moved to the genus Oenothera by the botanists Warren Lambert Wagner and Peter Coonan Hoch. It has no accepted subspecies or varieties according to Plants of the World Online. It has 6 synonyms.

Table of synonyms
Name	Year	Rank	Notes
Gaura biennis var. pitcheri Torr. & A.Gray	1840	variety	= het.
Gaura exaltata Engelm. & A.Gray	1845	species	= het.
Gaura filiformis Small	1898	species	≡ hom.
Gaura filiformis var. kearneyi Munz	1938	variety	= het.
Gaura filiformis var. typica Munz	1939	variety	≡ hom., not validly publ.
Gaura longiflora Spach	1835	species	= het.
Notes: ≡ homotypic synonym; = heterotypic synonym
