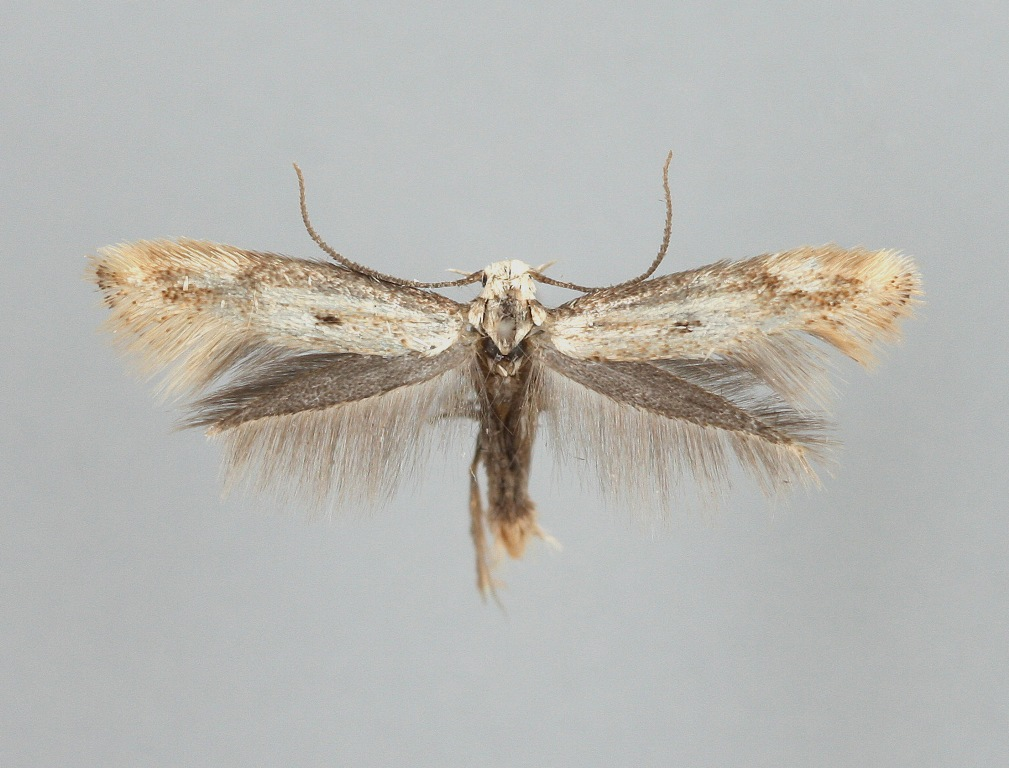

Scientific classification
- Domain: Eukaryota
- Kingdom: Animalia
- Phylum: Arthropoda
- Class: Insecta
- Order: Lepidoptera
- Family: Elachistidae
- Genus: Elachista
- Species: E. albidella

Binomial name
- Elachista albidella Nylander, 1848

Synonyms
- Biselachista albidella (Nylander, 1848); Aphelosetia rhynchosporella Stainton, 1848; Elachista rhynchosporella (Stainton, 1848); Elachista tanyopis Meyrick, 1932; Poeciloptilia uliginosella Herrich-Schäffer, 1855

= Elachista albidella =

Species of moth

Elachista albidella is a moth of the family Elachistidae, described by William Nylander in 1848. Its wingspan ranges from 9–10 millimetres (0.35–0.39 in).The head is white. Forewings are white, costa and sometimes dorsum suffused with fuscous; plical stigma large, elongate, black; an angulated fuscous fascia beyond middle, angle acutely produced towards apex; small fuscous costal and dorsal spots near apex. Hindwings are rather dark grey. The larva is greenish-grey, more yellowish anteriorly; head dark brown.

Elachista albidella is found in various locations across Europe; example habitat locations include Fennoscandia, northern Russia, the Pyrenees, Italy, Hungary, Ireland and Ukraine. It is also found in North America.

The larvae feed on Calamagrostis arundinacea, Carex acuta, Carex acutiformis, Carex riparia, Deschampsia cespitosa, Deschampsia flexuosa, Eleocharis palustris, Eriophorum angustifolium, Melica nutans, Poa palustris and Scirpus caespitosus.
