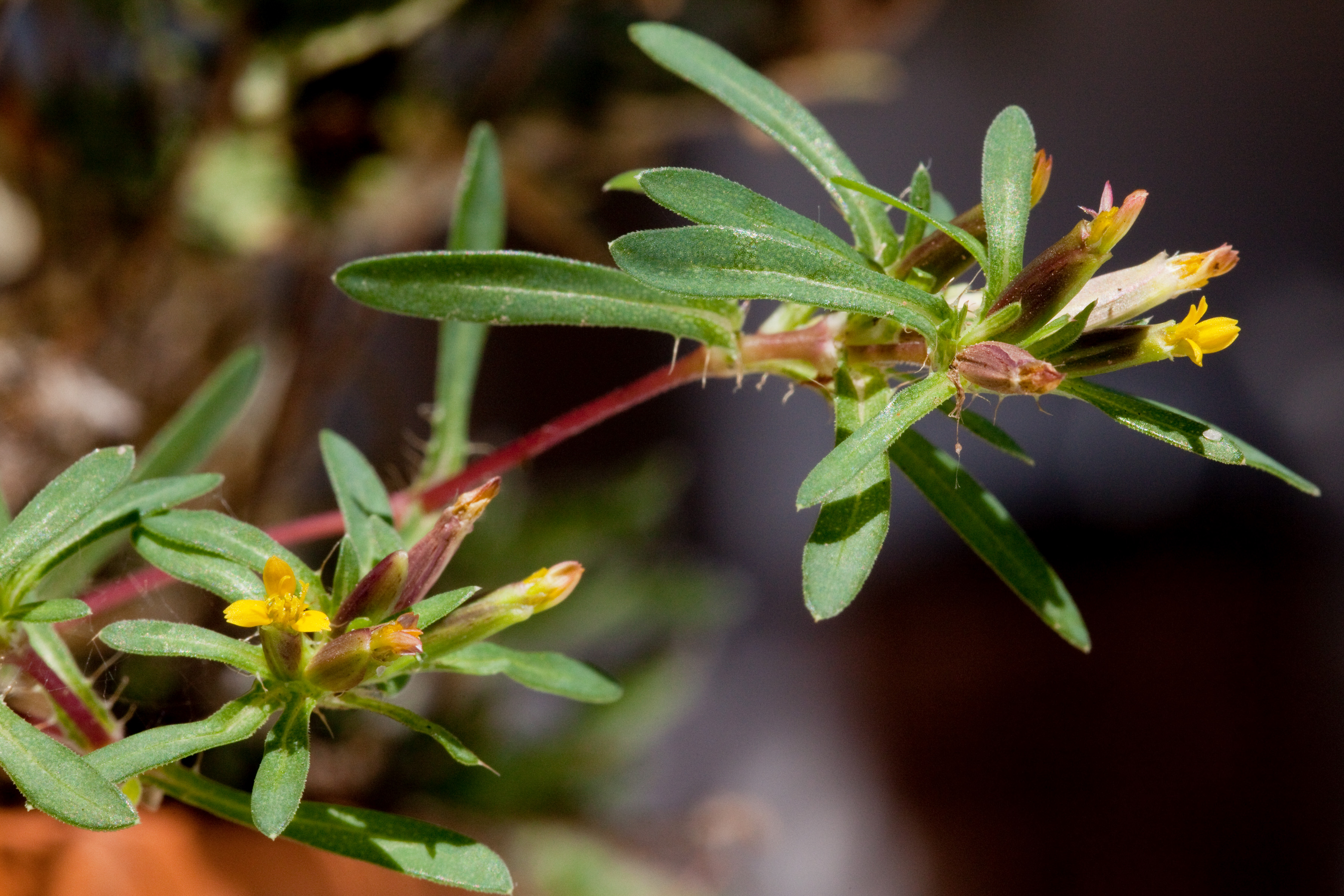

Scientific classification
- Kingdom: Plantae
- Clade: Tracheophytes
- Clade: Angiosperms
- Clade: Eudicots
- Clade: Asterids
- Order: Asterales
- Family: Asteraceae
- Genus: Pectis
- Species: P. cylindrica

Binomial name
- Pectis cylindrica (Fernald) Rydberg in N. L. Britton et al.

Synonyms
- Pectis prostrata var. cylindrica Fernald

= Pectis cylindrica =

Species of flowering plant

Pectis cylindrica, the Sonoran cinchweed, is an annual plant and species of Pectis. Pectis cylindrica is native to the southwestern United States (Arizona, New Mexico and Texas) and in northwestern Mexico (Baja California Sur, Chihuahua, Coahuila, Durango, Nuevo León, Sinaloa, Sonora).

Pectis cylindrica is similar to Pectis prostrata and the two occasionally grow together. Some herbaria contain mixed collections of the two although no evidence is available of hybrids between them.
