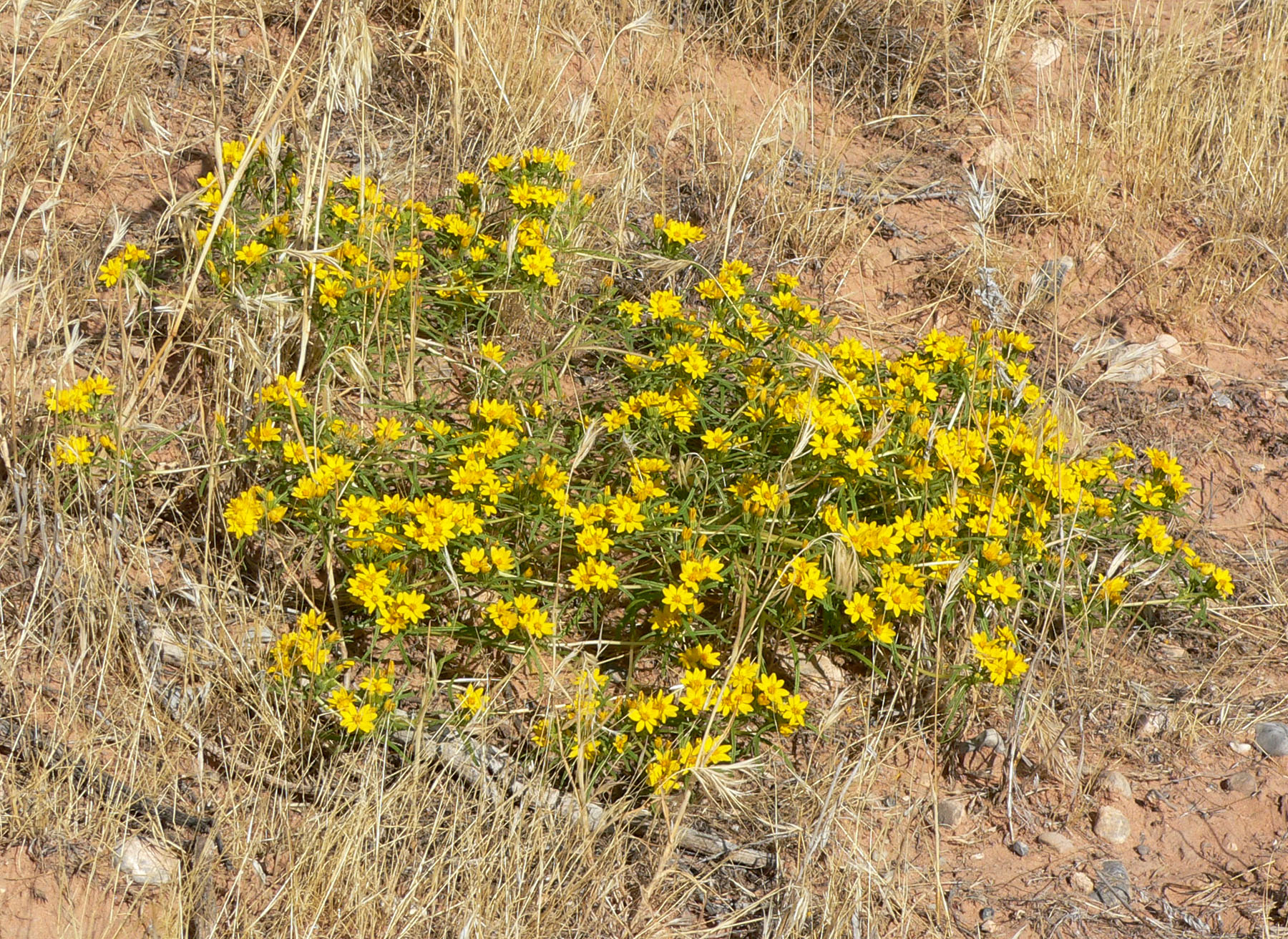
- Pectis papposa var. papposa

Conservation status
- Secure (NatureServe)

Scientific classification
- Kingdom: Plantae
- Clade: Tracheophytes
- Clade: Angiosperms
- Clade: Eudicots
- Clade: Asterids
- Order: Asterales
- Family: Asteraceae
- Genus: Pectis
- Species: P. papposa

Binomial name
- Pectis papposa Harv. & A. Gray

= Pectis papposa =

Species of flowering plant

Pectis papposa is a North American species of flowering plant in the family Asteraceae. Common names include cinchweed, common chinchweed, many-bristle chinchweed, and many-bristle fetid-marigold.

== Description ==
Pectis papposa grows to 5–20 centimetres (2–8 in) in height with branched stems. The leaves are 4 cm (1 1/2 in) long and less than 3 millimetres (1/8 in) wide. Blooming from July to October, the yellow flower heads are 1.5 cm (1/2 in) wide, with 7–9 rays around a small central disk; the bracts have 3–7 glands. The fruit is a narrow seed. Large groups of flowers can produce an odour of lemons.

=== Similar species ===
Pectis angustifolia is similar, but its bracts each have only one gland at the tip.

== Distribution and habitat ==
Pectis papposa is an annual herb that generally flowers following summer monsoon rains in the desert of southwestern United States as far east as Texas and northern Mexico. In favorable years, it becomes an aspect dominant, coloring wide areas of the desert.

== Ecology ==
It is a host plant of the beet leafhopper.

== Uses ==
It can be found in Mexican markets sold as limoncillo. It is used in moderation to flavor meat.

=== Among indigenous peoples ===
The Seri call the plant casol, casol heecto ("small casol"), casol ihasii tiipe ("fragrant casol"), and cacatajc ("what causes vomiting") and use it medicinally. The Pima use a decoction of the plant or the dried plant itself as a laxative. The Zuni people take an infusion of the whole plant as a carminative, and use an infusion of the flowers as eye drops for snowblindness. They also use the chewed flowers as perfume before dancing in ceremonies of "the secret fraternities". The Havasupai parch and grind the seeds and use them to make mush and soup. They also dip the fresh plant in salt water and eat it with mush or cornmeal as a condiment. The Pueblo use it as a spice.
