= Pectis filipes =

Scientific classification
- Kingdom: Plantae
- Clade: Tracheophytes
- Clade: Angiosperms
- Clade: Eudicots
- Clade: Asterids
- Order: Asterales
- Family: Asteraceae
- Genus: Pectis
- Species: P. filipes

Binomial name
- Pectis filipes Harv. & A.Gray

Species of flowering plant

Pectis filipes, the fivebract cinchweed, is a summer blooming annual plant of the family Asteraceae. It occurs in Texas, New Mexico, Arizona, and northern Mexico.

Pectis filipes is the more southern species of Pectis found in the Gila National Forest.
