= Pectis tenuicaulis =

Scientific classification
- Kingdom: Plantae
- Clade: Embryophytes
- Clade: Tracheophytes
- Clade: Angiosperms
- Clade: Eudicots
- Clade: Asterids
- Order: Asterales
- Family: Asteraceae
- Genus: Pectis
- Species: P. tenuicaulis

Binomial name
- Pectis tenuicaulis Urb.

Species of flowering plant

Pectis tenuicaulis, the island cinchweed, is a summer blooming annual plant in the genus Pectis.
