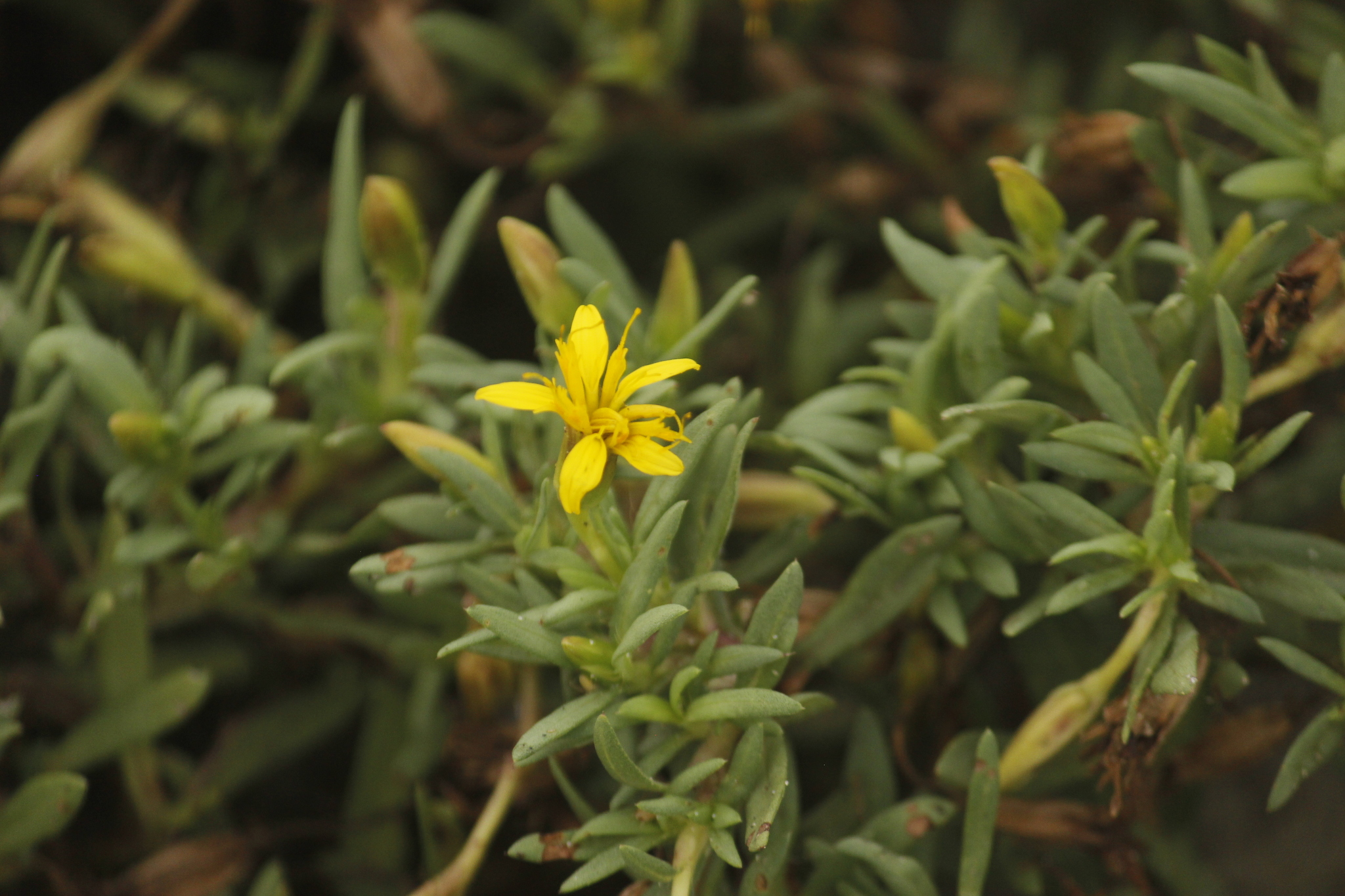

Scientific classification
- Kingdom: Plantae
- Clade: Embryophytes
- Clade: Tracheophytes
- Clade: Spermatophytes
- Clade: Angiosperms
- Clade: Eudicots
- Clade: Asterids
- Order: Asterales
- Family: Asteraceae
- Genus: Pectis
- Species: P. multiflosculosa

Binomial name
- Pectis multiflosculosa (DC.) Sch.Bip.

= Pectis multiflosculosa =

Species of flowering plant

Pectis multiflosculosa is a species of flowering plant in the genus Pectis. It can be found across the Americas, from Mexico to Ecuador, bordering the Pacific Ocean. It was described in 1856.

== Description ==
The oblanceolate leaves grow along on purple-red or green stems. All of the florets are bright yellow. The ray florets have space between each other. It is commonly found in sandy soils near beaches and spreads low as groundcover.
