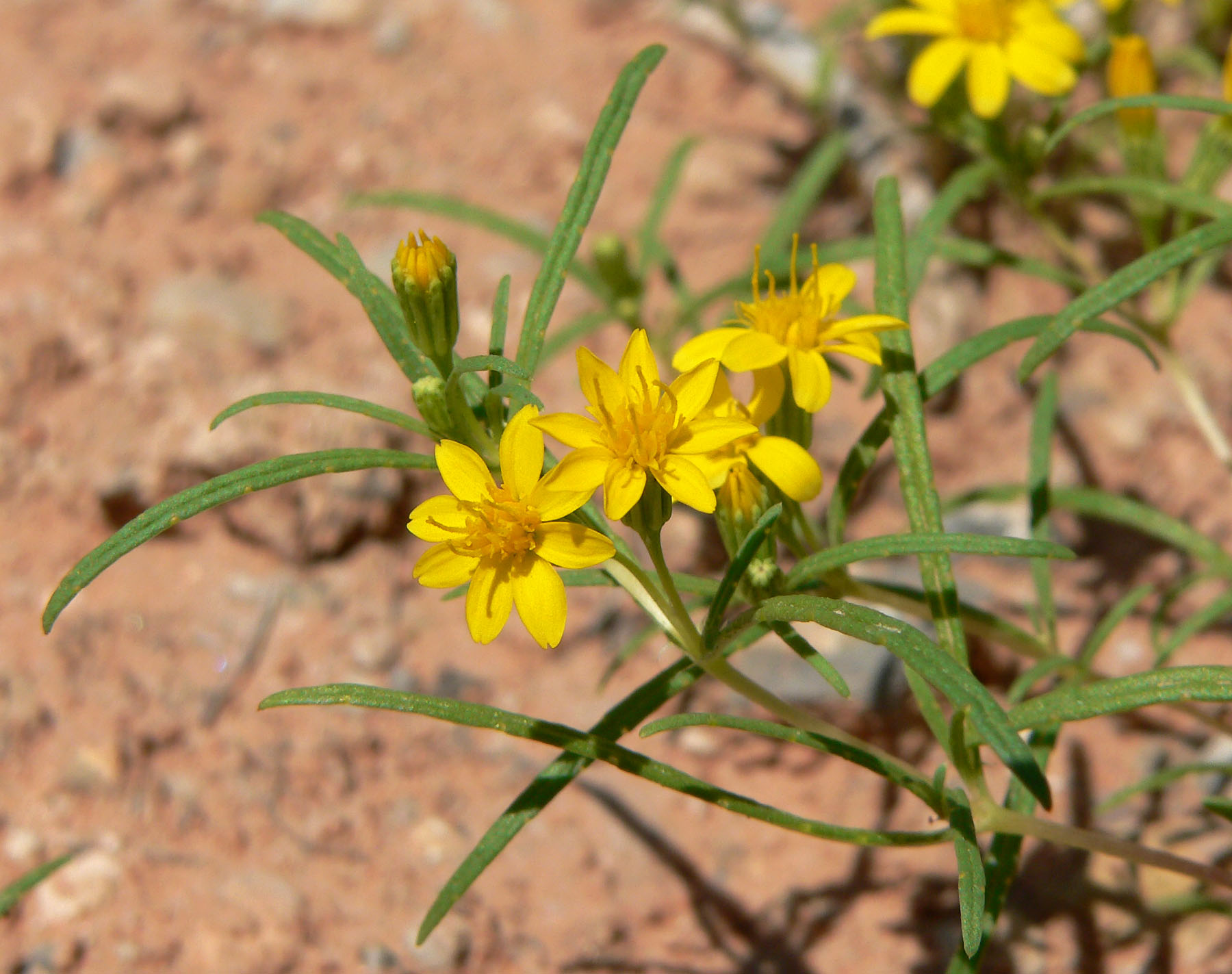
- Pectis papposa

Scientific classification
- Kingdom: Plantae
- Clade: Tracheophytes
- Clade: Angiosperms
- Clade: Eudicots
- Clade: Asterids
- Order: Asterales
- Family: Asteraceae
- Subfamily: Asteroideae
- Tribe: Tageteae
- Subtribe: Pectidinae
- Genus: Pectis; L.

Type species
- Pectis linifolia L.

Synonyms
- Lorentea Lag.; Tetracanthus A.Rich.; Chthonia Cass.; Cryptopetalon Cass.; Helioreos Raf.; Seala Adans.; Cryptopetalum Cass.; Stammarium Willd. ex DC.; Cheilodiscus Triana; Lorentea Less.; Pectidium Less.; Pascalia Orteg.; Pectidopsis DC.

= Pectis =

Genus of flowering plants

Pectis is a genus of flowering plants in the family Asteraceae described as a genus by Linnaeus in 1759.

The name is derived from the Latin word pecten, meaning "comb." It refers to the marginally-bristled leaves or the pappus form. These plants vary in appearance but they usually bear yellow daisy-like flower heads. Members of the genus are known generally as cinchweeds (current usage) or chinchweeds (older name).

They are native to the Americas, including the West Indies.

Species accepted by Plants of the World Online as of December 2022:

- Pectis amplifolia D.J.Keil
- Pectis angustifolia Torr.
- Pectis arida D.J.Keil
- Pectis barberi Greenm.
- Pectis berlandieri DC.
- Pectis bonplandiana Kunth
- Pectis brachycephala Urb.
- Pectis brevicaulis Urb.
- Pectis brevipedunculata Sch.Bip.
- Pectis burchellii Baker
- Pectis cajamarcana D.J.Keil
- Pectis canescens Kunth
- Pectis capillipes (Benth.) Hemsl.
- Pectis carthusianorum Less.
- Pectis caymanensis (Urb.) Rydb.
- Pectis christii Urb.
- Pectis ciliaris L.
- Pectis congesta Sch.Bip.
- Pectis coulteri Harv. & A.Gray
- Pectis cubensis Griseb.
- Pectis cylindrica Rydb.
- Pectis decemcarinata McVaugh
- Pectis decumbens Sch.Bip.
- Pectis depressa Fernald
- Pectis diffusa Hook. & Arn.
- Pectis domingensis Urb.
- Pectis elongata Kunth
- Pectis ericifolia D.J.Keil
- Pectis exilis D.J.Keil
- Pectis exserta McVaugh
- Pectis fasciculiflora DC.
- Pectis filipes Harv. & A.Gray
- Pectis × floridana D.J.Keil
- Pectis gardneri Baker
- Pectis glaucescens (Cass.) D.J.Keil
- Pectis gracilis Baker
- Pectis guaranitica Chodat
- Pectis haenkeana Sch.Bip.
- Pectis harryi D.J.N.Hind & Frisby
- Pectis hassleri D.J.Keil
- Pectis havanensis Urb.
- Pectis holochaeta (S.F.Blake) D.J.Keil
- Pectis humifusa Sw.
- Pectis imberbis A.Gray
- Pectis incisifolia I.M.Johnst.
- Pectis juniperina Rydb.
- Pectis latisquama Sch.Bip. ex Greenm.
- Pectis leavenworthii Standl. ex Leavenw.
- Pectis leonis Rydb.
- Pectis liebmannii Sch.Bip. ex Hemsl.
- Pectis linearifolia Urb.
- Pectis linearis La Llave
- Pectis linifolia L.
- Pectis longipes A.Gray
- Pectis luckoviae D.J.Keil
- Pectis masonii Cuatrec.
- Pectis monocephala Cuatrec.
- Pectis mornicola Urb. & Ekman
- Pectis multiceps Urb.
- Pectis multiflosculosa (DC.) Sch.Bip.
- Pectis multiseta Benth.
- Pectis odorata Griseb.
- Pectis oligocephala Sch.Bip.
- Pectis papposa Harv. & A.Gray
- Pectis peruviana D.J.Keil
- Pectis pimana Laferr. & D.J.Keil
- Pectis pinosia Urb.
- Pectis pringlei Fernald
- Pectis propetes Greenm.
- Pectis prostrata Cav.
- Pectis pumila D.J.Keil
- Pectis purpurascens Urb. & Ekman
- Pectis purpurea Brandegee
- Pectis pusilla Urb.
- Pectis pygmaea Kunth
- Pectis repens Brandegee
- Pectis rigida Baker
- Pectis ritlandii R.A.Howard & W.R.Briggs
- Pectis rusbyi Greene ex A.Gray
- Pectis samanensis Urb.
- Pectis saturejoides (Mill.) Sch.Bip.
- Pectis schaffneri Sch.Bip. ex A.Gray
- Pectis sessiliflora Sch.Bip.
- Pectis sinaloensis Fernald
- Pectis stella Malme
- Pectis stenophylla A.Gray
- Pectis subeglandulosa Urb. & Ekman
- Pectis subsquarrosa Sch.Bip.
- Pectis substriata Rusby
- Pectis tenuicaulis Urb.
- Pectis tenuifolia Sch.Bip.
- Pectis uniaristata DC.
- Pectis vandevenderi B.L.Turner
- Pectis vollmeri Wiggins
