= Pectis humifusa =

Scientific classification
- Kingdom: Plantae
- Clade: Tracheophytes
- Clade: Angiosperms
- Clade: Eudicots
- Clade: Asterids
- Order: Asterales
- Family: Asteraceae
- Genus: Pectis
- Species: P. humifusa

Binomial name
- Pectis humifusa Sw.

Species of flowering plant

Pectis humifusa, the yerba de San Juan, is a summer blooming annual plant of the genus Pectis. In the Lesser Antilles, it occurs most frequently in the salt spray zone near the seashore; on some islands, it occurs inland as well. Its floral region is Puerto Rico, The Virgin Islands and Florida.
