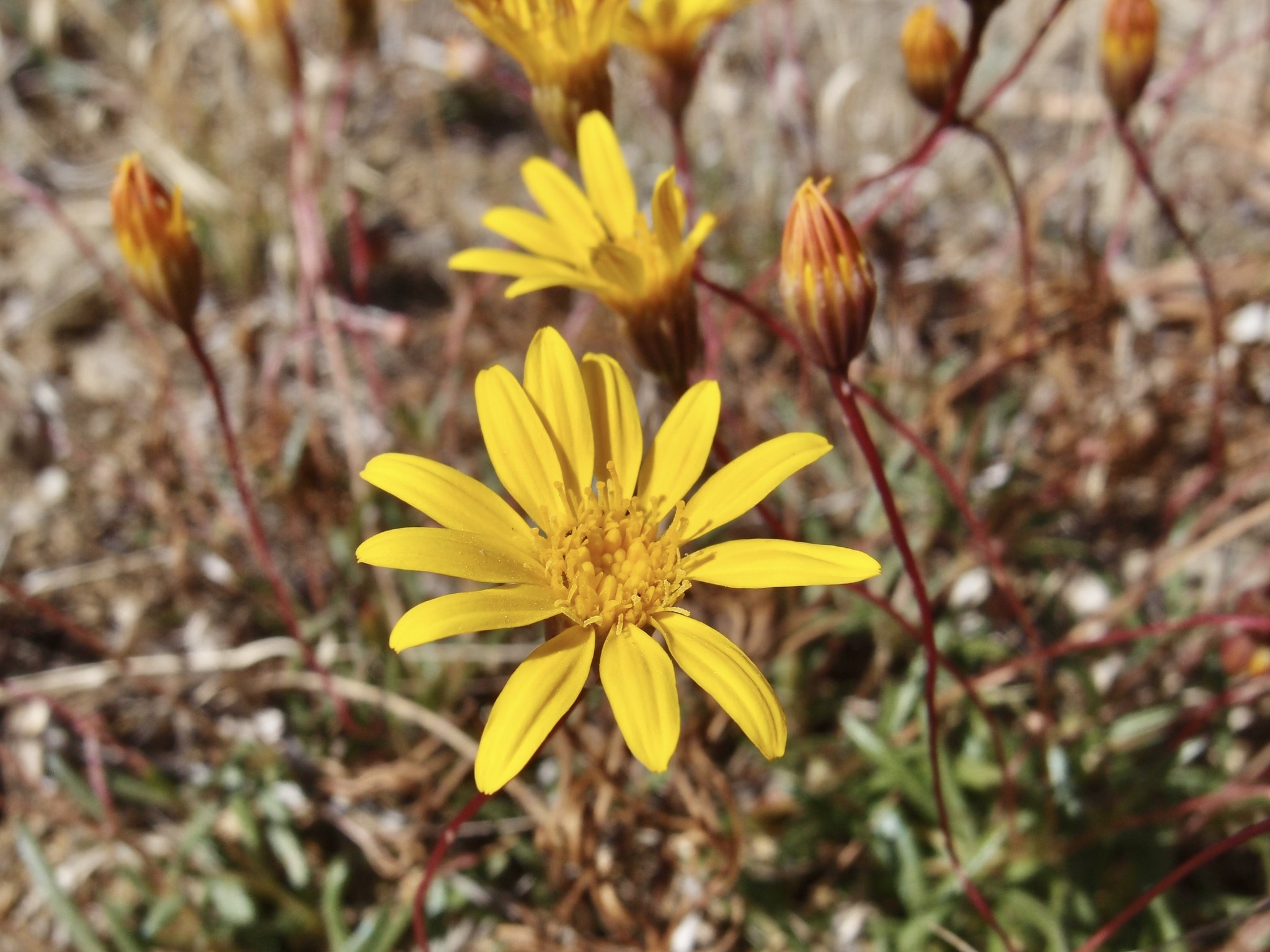

Scientific classification
- Kingdom: Plantae
- Clade: Tracheophytes
- Clade: Angiosperms
- Clade: Eudicots
- Clade: Asterids
- Order: Asterales
- Family: Asteraceae
- Genus: Pectis
- Species: P. longipes

Binomial name
- Pectis longipes A.Gray

= Pectis longipes =

Longstalk cinchweed

Species of flowering plant

Pectis longipes, the longstalk cinchweed, is a summer blooming perennial plant in the family Asteraceae. It is found in the US states of Arizona and New Mexico.
