= Pectis carthusianorum =

Scientific classification
- Kingdom: Plantae
- Clade: Tracheophytes
- Clade: Angiosperms
- Clade: Eudicots
- Clade: Asterids
- Order: Asterales
- Family: Asteraceae
- Genus: Pectis
- Species: P. carthusianorum

Binomial name
- Pectis carthusianorum Less.

Species of flowering plant

Pectis carthusianorum, the Caribbean cinchweed, is a summer blooming annual plant of the genus Pectis, found in Puerto Rico. It is also native to Cuba, Dominican Republic, Haiti, and Venezuela.
