= Pectis elongata =

Scientific classification
- Kingdom: Plantae
- Clade: Tracheophytes
- Clade: Angiosperms
- Clade: Eudicots
- Clade: Asterids
- Order: Asterales
- Family: Asteraceae
- Genus: Pectis
- Species: P. elongata

Binomial name
- Pectis elongata Kunth

Synonyms
- Chthonia elongata Cass.; Lorentea polycephala Gardner; Pectis elongata var. divaricata Hieron.; Pectis elongata var. floribunda (A. Rich.) D.J. Keil; Pectis elongata var. oerstediana (Rydb.) D.J. Keil; Pectis floribunda A. Rich.; Pectis oerstediana Rydb.; Pectis plumieri Griseb.

Species of flowering plant

Pectis elongata, the tropical cinchweed, is a summer blooming annual plant of the genus Pectis, found in the West Indies as well as in South and Central America. Tropical cinchweed is burned as a mosquito repellent.
