= Pectis linearis =

Scientific classification
- Kingdom: Plantae
- Clade: Tracheophytes
- Clade: Angiosperms
- Clade: Eudicots
- Clade: Asterids
- Order: Asterales
- Family: Asteraceae
- Genus: Pectis
- Species: P. linearis

Binomial name
- Pectis linearis La Llave

Synonyms
- Pectis capillaris DC.; Pectis densa Rusby; Pectis elongata var. schottii Fernald; Pectis febrifuga H.C. Hall; Pectis graveolens Klatt; Pectis rosea Rusby; Pectis schottii (Fernald) Millsp. & Chase

Species of flowering plant

Pectis linearis, the West Indian cinchweed, is a summer blooming annual plant in the genus Pectis. Its floral region is generally Puerto Rico and the Virgin Islands.
