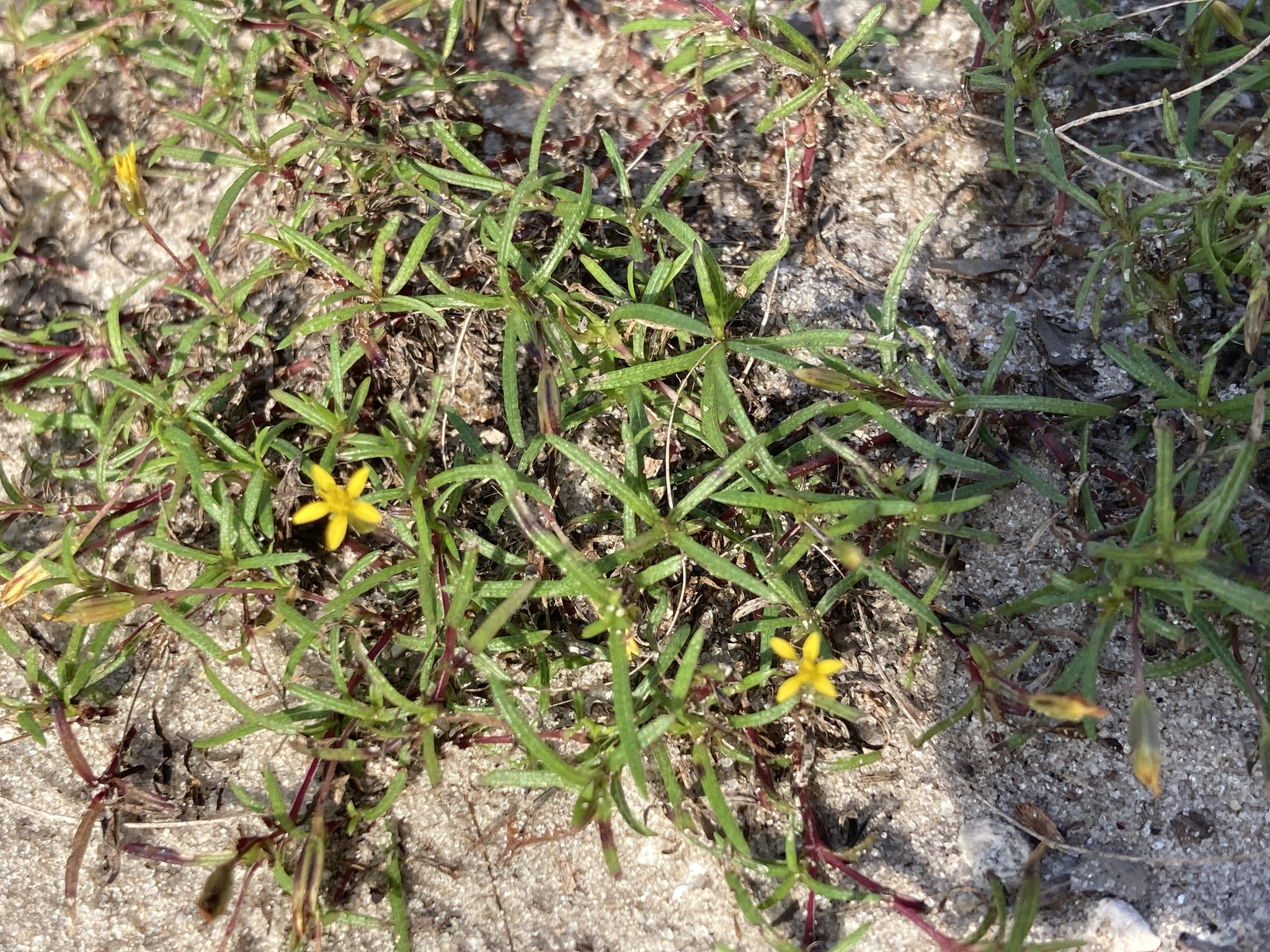

Scientific classification
- Kingdom: Plantae
- Clade: Tracheophytes
- Clade: Angiosperms
- Clade: Eudicots
- Clade: Asterids
- Order: Asterales
- Family: Asteraceae
- Genus: Pectis
- Species: P. glaucescens

Binomial name
- Pectis glaucescens (Cass.) Keil

Synonyms
- Chthonia glaucescens Cass.; Chthonia leptocephala Cass.; Pectis lephocephala (Cass.) Urb.; Pectis lessingiiFernald

= Pectis glaucescens =

Species of flowering plant

Pectis glaucescens, the sanddune cinchweed or tea blinkum, is a species of summer blooming annual plant in the family Asteraceae. It is native to Florida, Hispaniola, Jamaica and the Bahamas.

Pectis glaucescens is a freely-branching annual weed with opposing leaves in narrow rows. Leaves contain rows of oil glands on the lower surface. It has long-stalked yellow flowers with two to five small-scale fruits.
