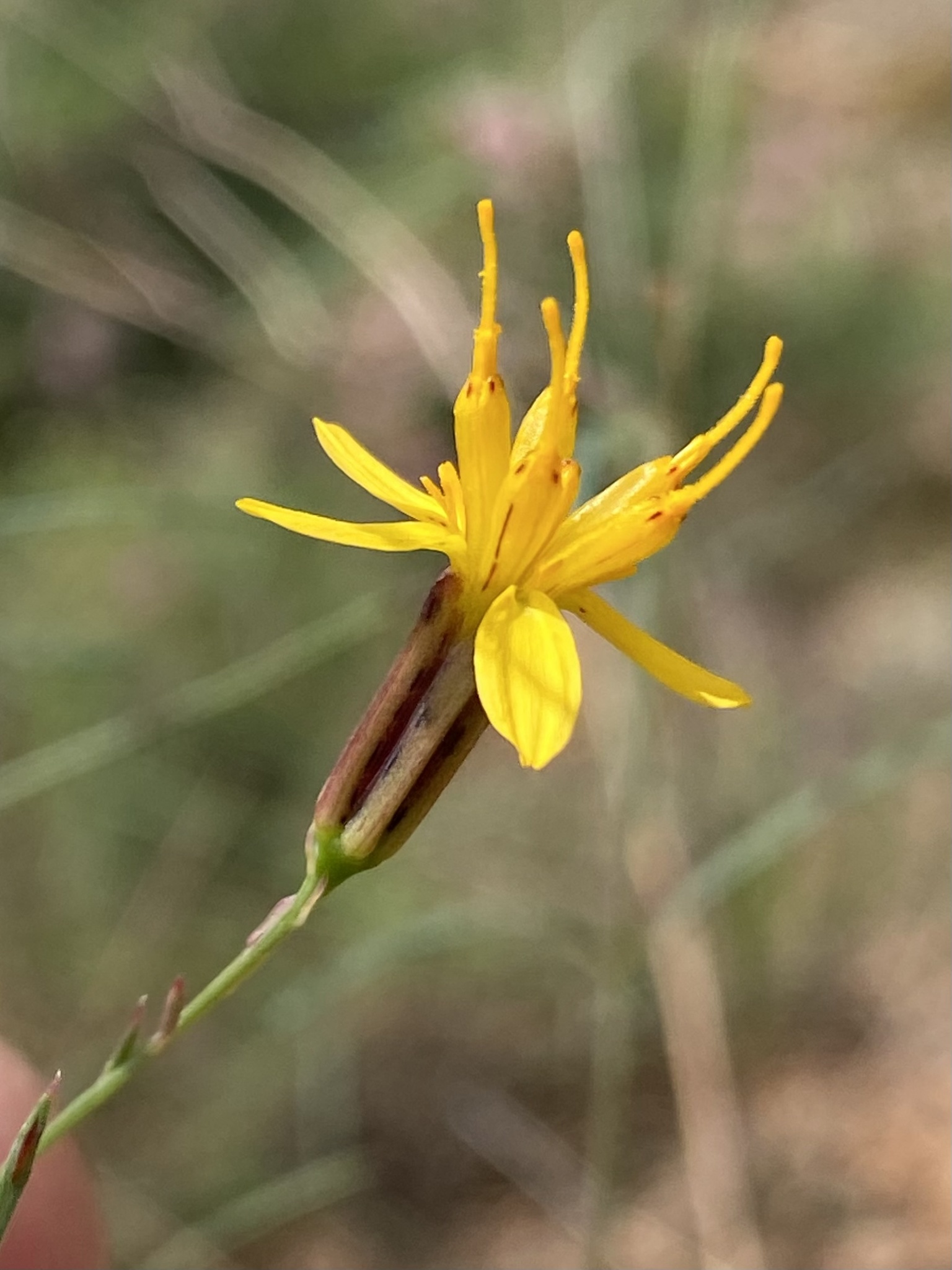

Conservation status
- Vulnerable (NatureServe)

Scientific classification
- Kingdom: Plantae
- Clade: Tracheophytes
- Clade: Angiosperms
- Clade: Eudicots
- Clade: Asterids
- Order: Asterales
- Family: Asteraceae
- Genus: Pectis
- Species: P. imberbis

Binomial name
- Pectis imberbis A. Gray

= Pectis imberbis =

Species of flowering plant

Pectis imberbis is a species of flowering plant in the family Asteraceae. It is native to Chihuahua and Sonora in Mexico and Arizona in the United States. It is known by the common names beardless chinchweed, beardless fetid-marigold, hierba de venado, and tall chinchweed.

This species is a perennial herb growing erect up to 1.2 meters tall from a woody caudex. The linear leaves are up to 5 centimeters long and only 1 or 2 millimeters wide. Flower heads are borne singly or in loose arrays. Each flower head has a cylindrical body lined with glandular phyllaries. It contains 5 yellow ray florets with a few disc florets at the center. The florets may turn reddish or purple with age. Flowering occurs after summer rainfall in August through October.

This plant grows in many kinds of habitat, including woodland, grassland, and dry shrubland. It can generally thrive in disturbed habitat, but overgrazing may eliminate populations.
