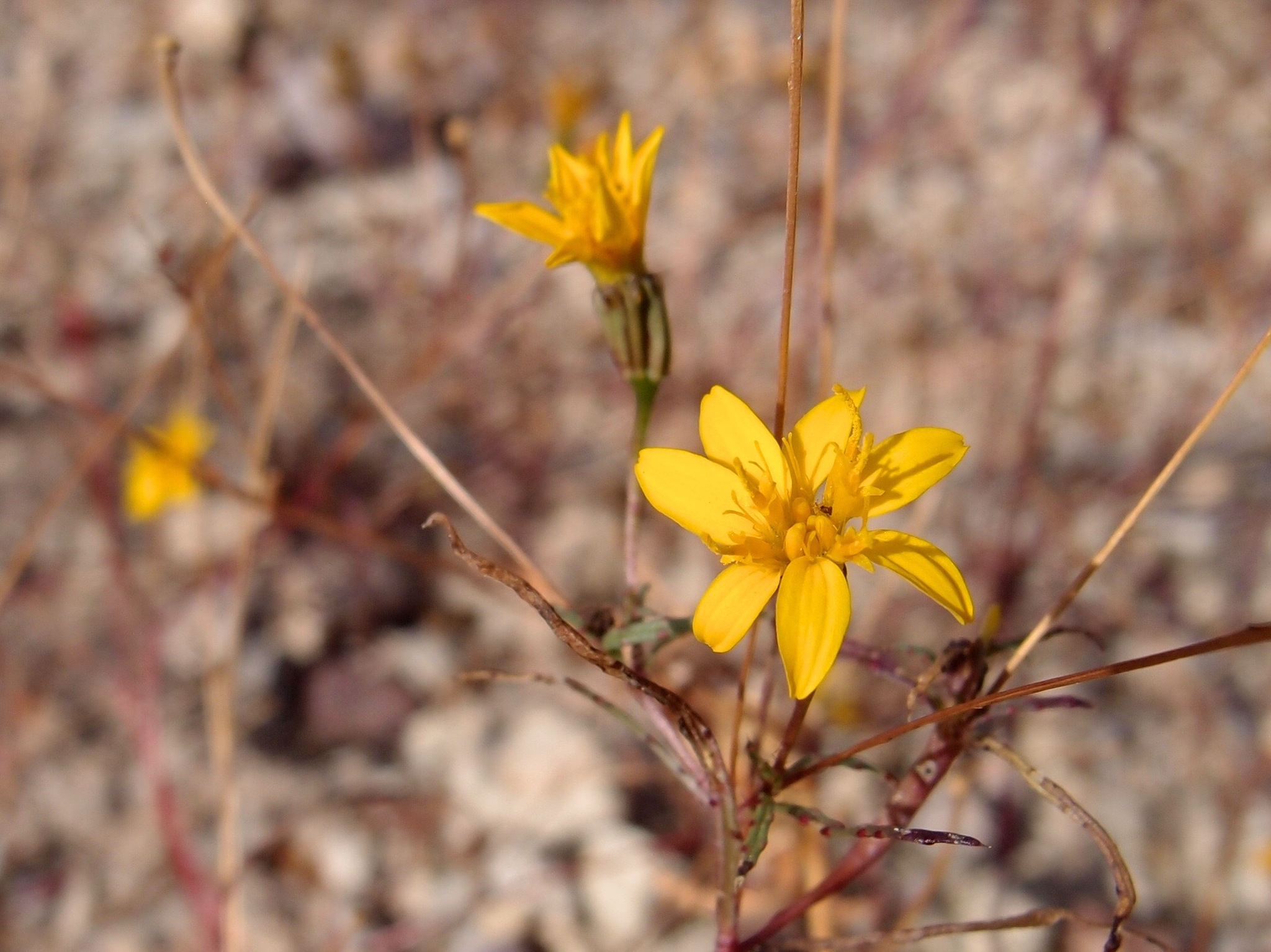

Scientific classification
- Kingdom: Plantae
- Clade: Tracheophytes
- Clade: Angiosperms
- Clade: Eudicots
- Clade: Asterids
- Order: Asterales
- Family: Asteraceae
- Genus: Pectis
- Species: P. rusbyi

Binomial name
- Pectis rusbyi Greene ex A.Gray

= Pectis rusbyi =

Species of flowering plant

Pectis rusbyi, or Rusby's cinchweed, is a summer blooming annual plant in the genus Pectis. Its floral region is Arizona.
