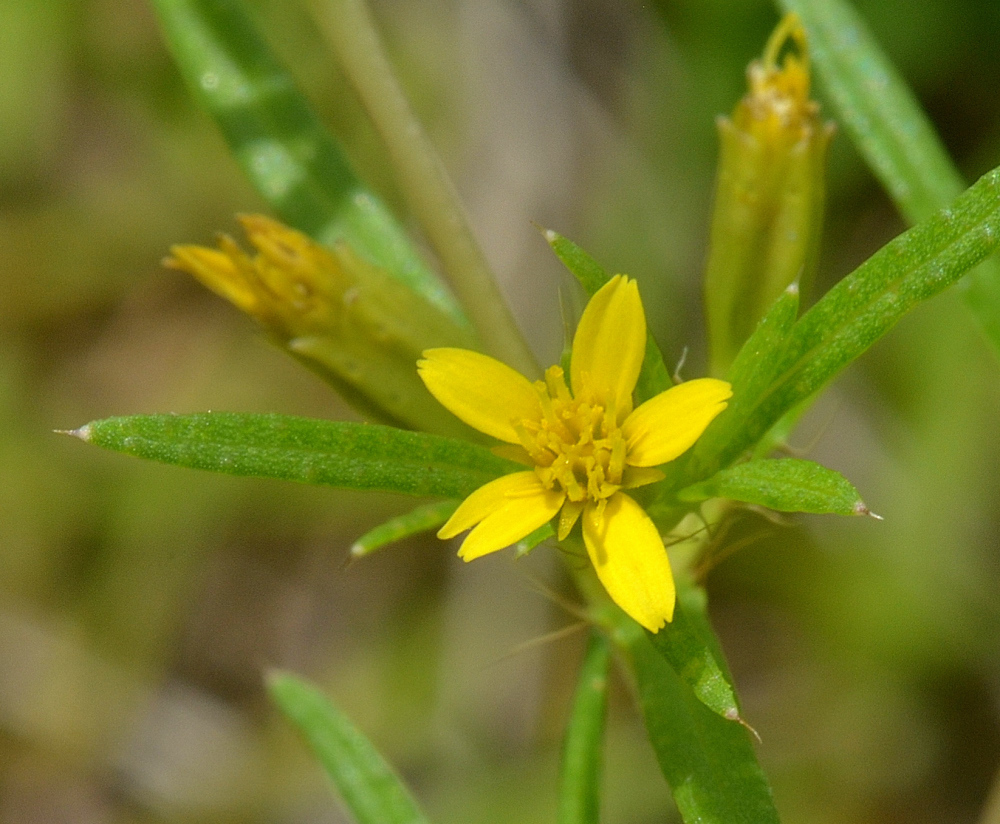

Scientific classification
- Kingdom: Plantae
- Clade: Tracheophytes
- Clade: Angiosperms
- Clade: Eudicots
- Clade: Asterids
- Order: Asterales
- Family: Asteraceae
- Genus: Pectis
- Species: P. linearifolia

Binomial name
- Pectis linearifolia Urban

= Pectis linearifolia =

Species of flowering plant

Pectis linearifolia, the Florida cinchweed, is a summer blooming annual plant in the genus Pectis. Although the plant exhibits the ecology of an introduced non-native plant, it is known with certainty only from south Florida, and must be regarded as native in view of current distribution data. It has also reputedly been found in Jamaica, but the Jamaican reports are evidently somewhat doubtful.
