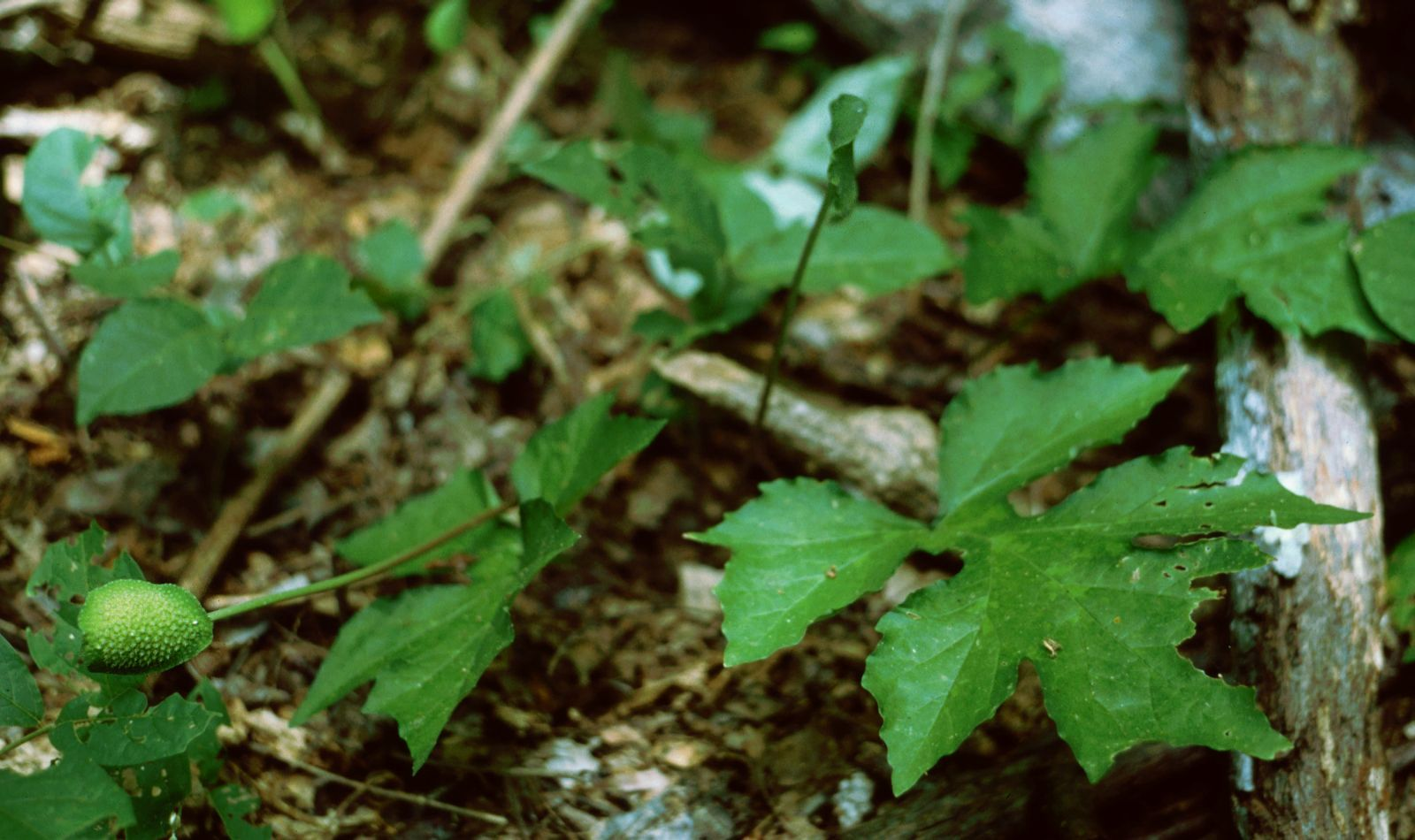
- Santa Rosa National Park, Guanacaste Province, Costa Rica

Scientific classification
- Kingdom: Plantae
- Clade: Tracheophytes
- Clade: Angiosperms
- Clade: Eudicots
- Clade: Rosids
- Order: Rosales
- Family: Moraceae
- Genus: Dorstenia
- Species: D. drakena

Binomial name
- Dorstenia drakena L.

Synonyms
- Dorstenia ovalis Stokes; Dorstenia mexicana Benth. Dorstenia crispata S.Watson

= Dorstenia drakena =

Atlantic Dorstenia

Species of plant

Dorstenia drakena, the atlantic dorstenia, is a plant species in the family Moraceae which is native to Mexico and Central America.
