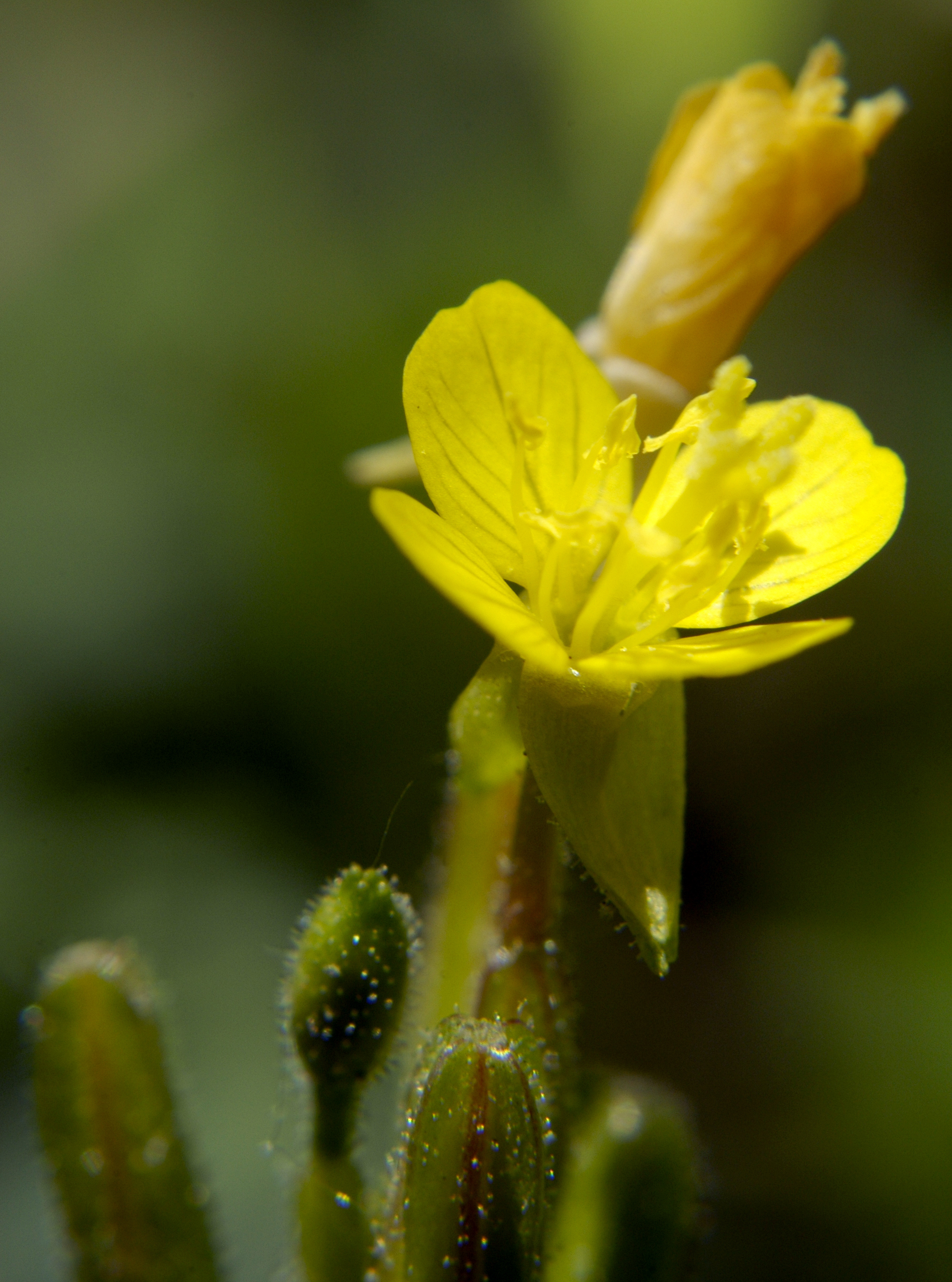

Conservation status
- Secure (NatureServe)

Scientific classification
- Kingdom: Plantae
- Clade: Tracheophytes
- Clade: Angiosperms
- Clade: Eudicots
- Clade: Rosids
- Order: Myrtales
- Family: Onagraceae
- Genus: Oenothera
- Species: O. perennis

Binomial name
- Oenothera perennis L.

= Oenothera perennis =

Species of flowering plant

Oenothera perennis is a species of flowering plant in the family Onagraceae and is native to the eastern United States and Canada. Its common names include little evening primrose, small sundrops, and small evening primrose. Its native habitats include shaly slopes, moist or dry fields, pastures and roadsides. Oenothera perennis is a perennial herb. It has yellow flowers that open during the day and close at night. Each flower has four petals that are notched at the tip with veins radiating from the base.
