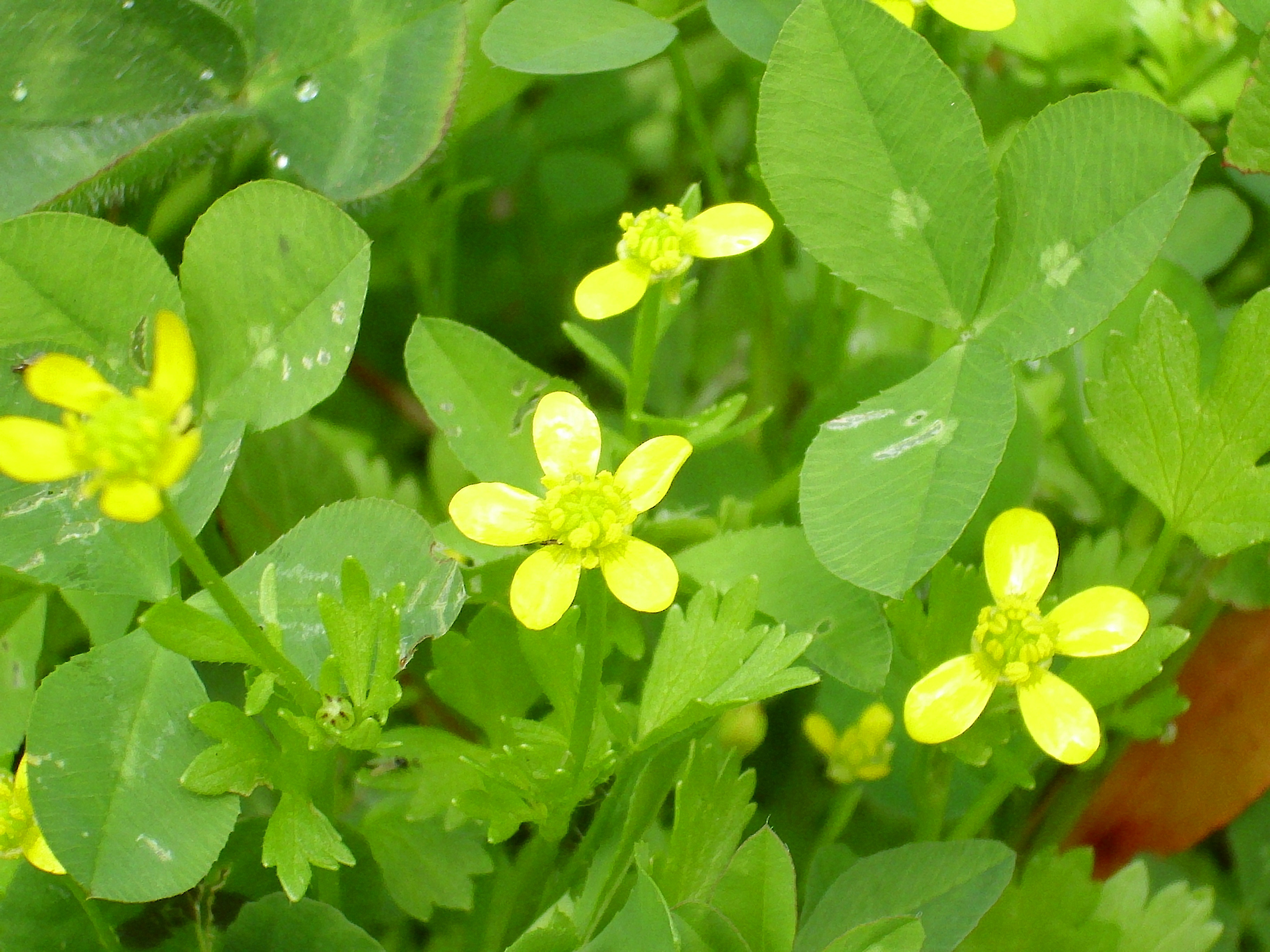

Scientific classification
- Kingdom: Plantae
- Clade: Tracheophytes
- Clade: Angiosperms
- Clade: Eudicots
- Order: Ranunculales
- Family: Ranunculaceae
- Genus: Ranunculus
- Species: R. parviflorus

Binomial name
- Ranunculus parviflorus L.

= Ranunculus parviflorus =

Species of flowering plant

Ranunculus parviflorus is a species of buttercup known by the common name smallflower buttercup. It is native to Europe, but it is known on other areas of the world as an introduced species and sometimes a roadside weed, for example, in parts of Australia and the United States.

== Description ==
It is an annual herb producing a mostly erect stem up to 40 centimeters in maximum height. It is coated in soft hairs. The leaves have rounded blades which are toothed, deeply cut, or divided into lobes, which in turn are toothed. The leaves are borne on long petioles, the longest near the base of the plant. Flowers are 3 to 6 mm across and occur singly in leaf axils. Each flower has a few tiny yellow petals no more than 2 millimeters long; some flowers lack petals. The sepals are bent backwards. The fruit is an achene borne in a spherical cluster of usually 10 to 20.

== Habitat ==
In Ireland found in fields of some southern counties, becoming rarer.
