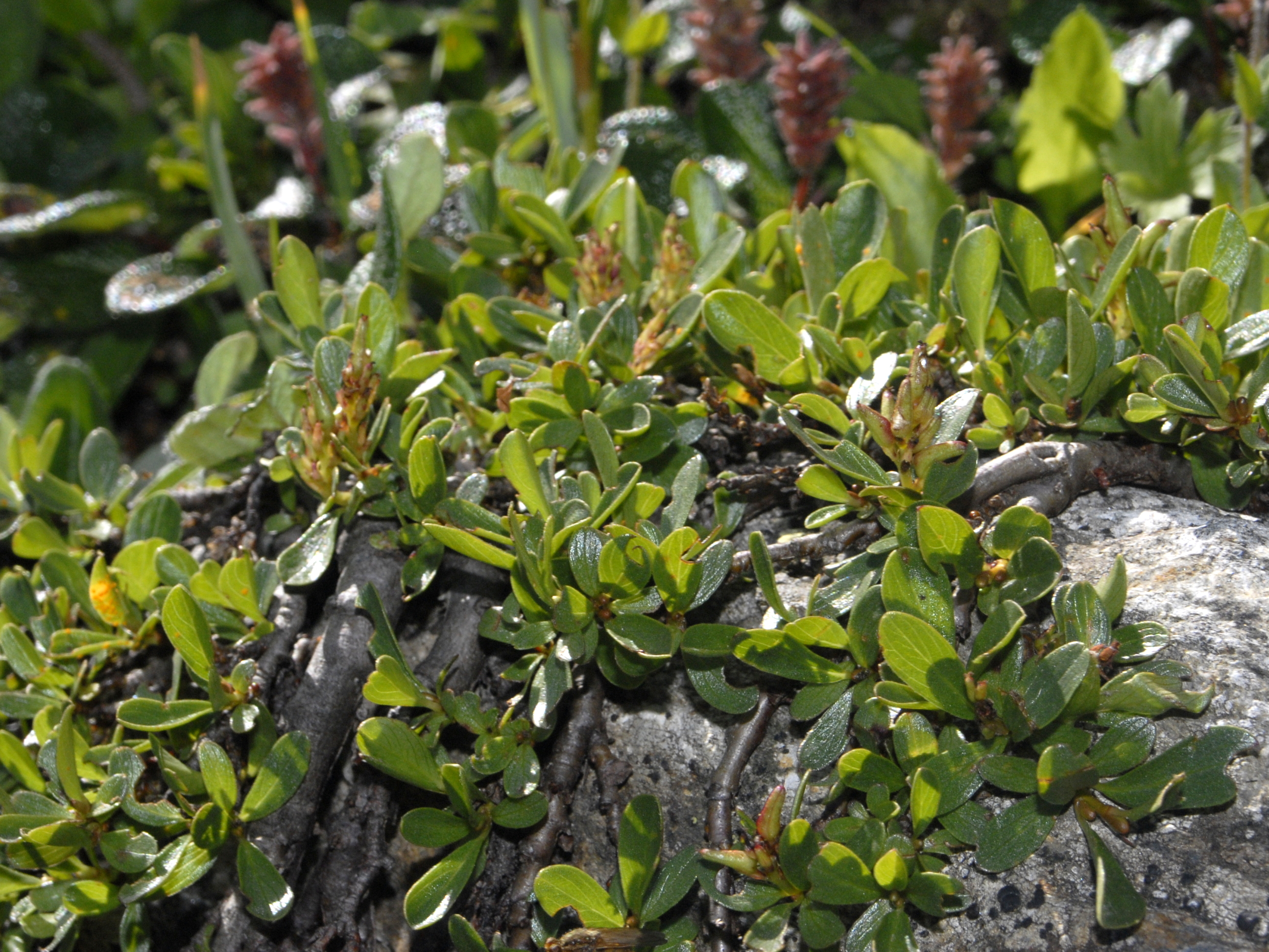
- Salix retusa at the Giardino Botanico Alpino Chanousia

Scientific classification
- Kingdom: Plantae
- Clade: Tracheophytes
- Clade: Angiosperms
- Clade: Eudicots
- Clade: Rosids
- Order: Malpighiales
- Family: Salicaceae
- Genus: Salix
- Species: S. retusa

Binomial name
- Salix retusa L.

= Salix retusa =

Retuse-leaved WIllow

Species of flowering plant

Salix retusa, the retuse-leaved willow, is a species of flowering plant in the family Salicaceae.

== Description ==
Salix retusa can reach a height of 10–30 centimetres (3.9–11.8 in). This plant usually develops creeping stems, rarely erect. The dull green leaves are obovate, lanceolate or elliptic, with entire margins, 2 × 1 cm, with very short petioles. Like all willows this species is dioecious. Catkins are broadly cylindrical, with yellow anthers. Flowers bloom from June to July.

== Distribution ==
It is present in the mountains of central and southern Europe including the Pyrenees and the mountains of Bulgaria.

== Habitat ==
This species can be found in rock crevices and screes at elevation of 2,000–2,700 metres (6,600–8,900 ft) above sea level.
