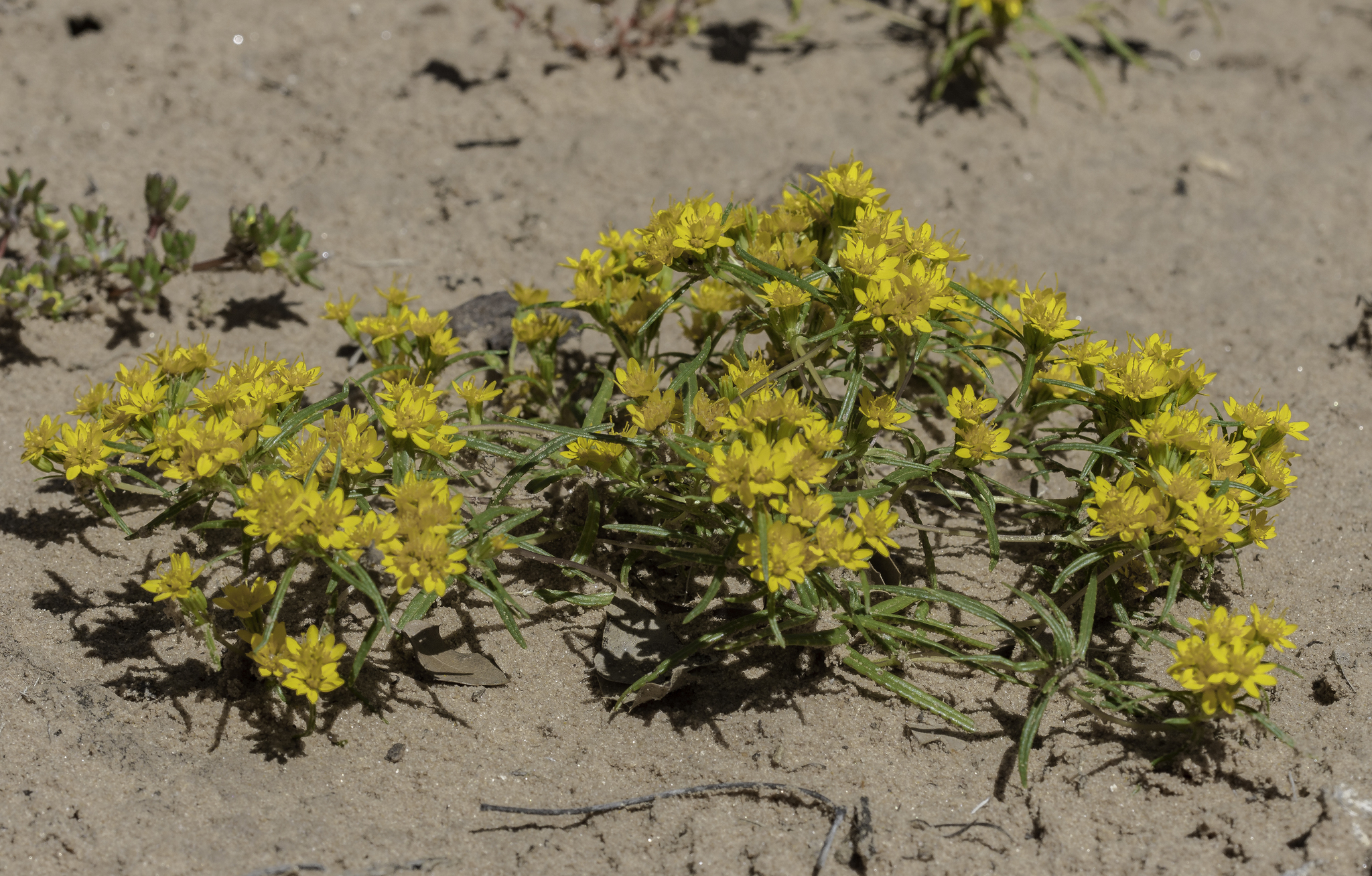

Conservation status
- Apparently Secure (NatureServe)

Scientific classification
- Kingdom: Plantae
- Clade: Tracheophytes
- Clade: Angiosperms
- Clade: Eudicots
- Clade: Asterids
- Order: Asterales
- Family: Asteraceae
- Genus: Pectis
- Species: P. angustifolia

Binomial name
- Pectis angustifolia Torr.

Synonyms
- Pectis angustifolia var. fastigiata (A.Gray) D.J.Keil; Pectis angustifolia var. subaristata A. Gray; Pectis fastigiata A. Gray; Pectis papposa var. sessilis M.E. Jones; Pectis texana Cory

= Pectis angustifolia =

Species of flowering plant

Pectis angustifolia, the lemonscented cinchweed, is a summer blooming annual plant which is found in Western North America, generally from Nebraska and Colorado to Arizona and Mexico. It is in flower from July to October, and the seeds ripen from September to October. Lemonscented cinchweed cannot grow in the shade. The plant is carminative and emetic. The crushed leaves have been used in the treatment of stomach aches.

Among the Hopi of Arizona it was known as taichima and was eaten boiled with green corn.

== Bibliography ==
- p161. Yanovsky. E. Food Plants of the N. American Indians. Publication no. 237
- p177. Kunkel. G. Plants for Human Consumption
- p216. Whiting. A. F. Ethnobotany of the Hopi
- p235. Britton. N. L. Brown. A. An Illustrated Flora of the Northern United States and Canada
- p245. Genders. R. Scented Flora of the World.
- p257. Moerman. D. Native American Ethnobotany
- p274. Diggs, Jnr. G.M.; Lipscomb. B. L. & O'Kennon. R. J. Illustrated Flora of North Central Texas
