= Pectis ciliaris =

Scientific classification
- Kingdom: Plantae
- Clade: Tracheophytes
- Clade: Angiosperms
- Clade: Eudicots
- Clade: Asterids
- Order: Asterales
- Family: Asteraceae
- Genus: Pectis
- Species: P. ciliaris

Binomial name
- Pectis ciliaris L.

Species of flowering plant

Pectis ciliaris, the donkeyweed, is a species of Pectis and is an annual plant. Its floral region is the Caribbean, mainly Puerto Rico.
