= Pectis linifolia =

Conservation status
- Secure (NatureServe)

Scientific classification
- Kingdom: Plantae
- Clade: Tracheophytes
- Clade: Angiosperms
- Clade: Eudicots
- Clade: Asterids
- Order: Asterales
- Family: Asteraceae
- Genus: Pectis
- Species: P. linifolia

Binomial name
- Pectis linifolia L.

Synonyms
- Pectidium punctatum (Jacq.) Less.; Pectis linifolia var. hirtella S.F. Blake; Pectis linifolia var. marginalis Fernald; Pectis punctata Jacq.; Tetracanthus linearifolius A. Rich.; Verbesina linifolia L. (Illegitimate)

Species of flowering plant

Pectis linifolia, the romero macho, is a summer blooming annual plant in the genus Pectis. It is widespread throughout Mexico, Central America, South America and the West Indies. In the mainland United States, it has been reported only from Arizona and Florida.
