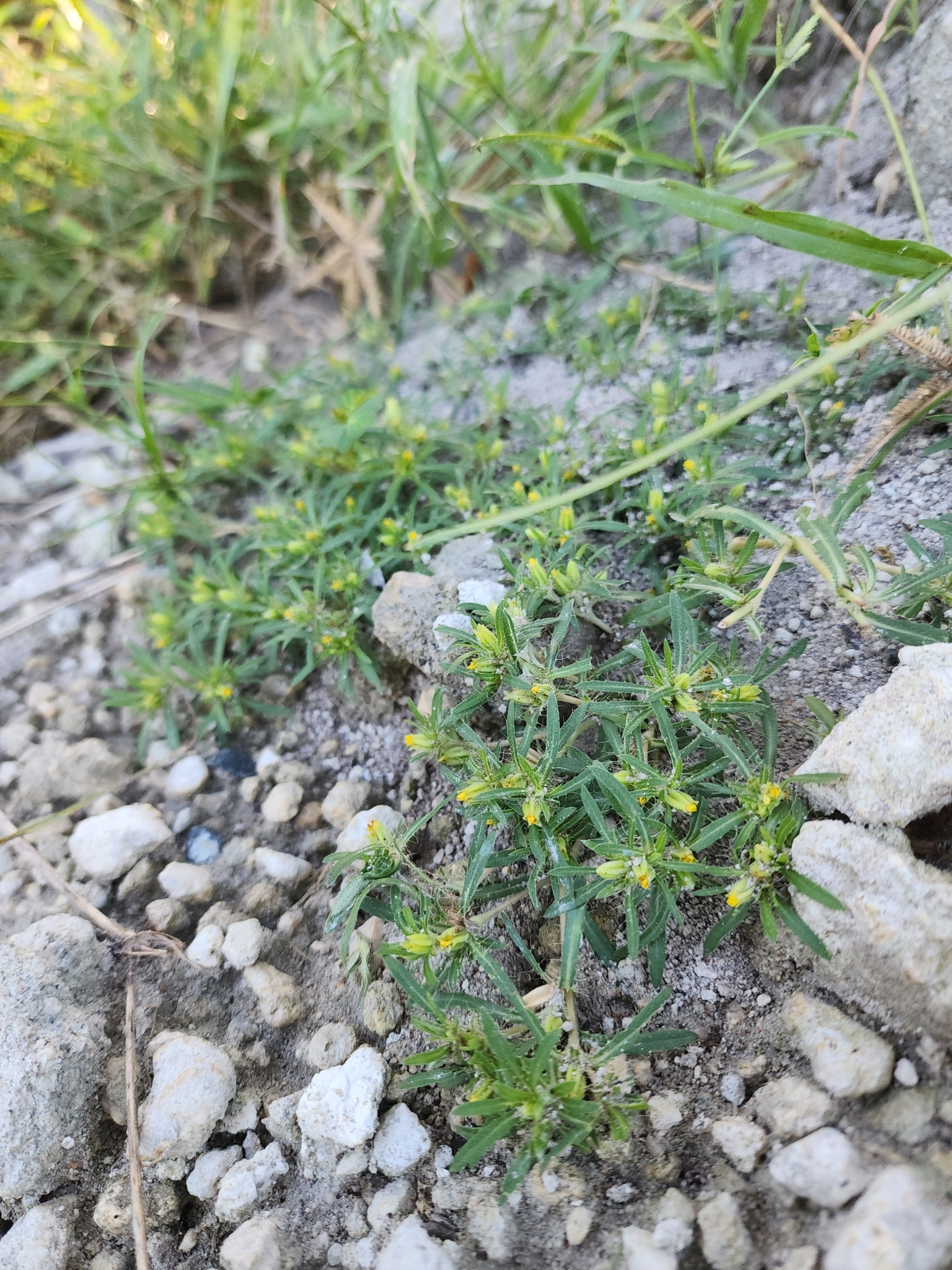
- Growing on a heap of limerock roadfill

Conservation status
- Apparently Secure (NatureServe)

Scientific classification
- Kingdom: Plantae
- Clade: Tracheophytes
- Clade: Angiosperms
- Clade: Eudicots
- Clade: Asterids
- Order: Asterales
- Family: Asteraceae
- Genus: Pectis
- Species: P. prostrata

Binomial name
- Pectis prostrata Cav.

= Pectis prostrata =

Species of flowering plant

Pectis prostrata, the spreading cinchweed, is a summer blooming annual plant of the genus Pectis. The development of roads and highways has created ideal habitats for Pectis prostrata. Its range is expanding along the coasts of Florida, it was recently discovered in Louisiana. It is expected to spread along the Gulf Coast and also northward along the Atlantic Coast. Autogamy has assisted Pectis prostrata to spread rapidly as suitable new habitats have become available.
