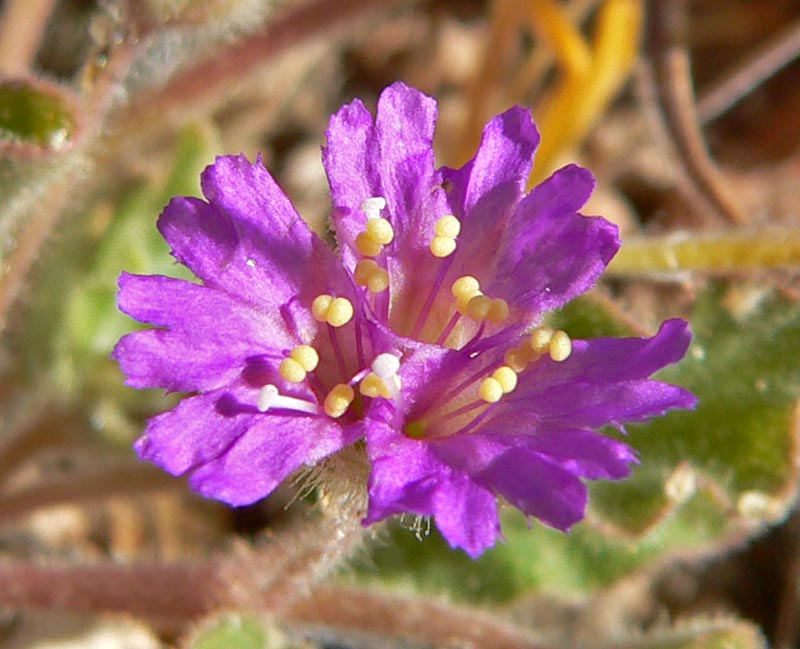
- In Nevada

Scientific classification
- Kingdom: Plantae
- Clade: Tracheophytes
- Clade: Angiosperms
- Clade: Eudicots
- Order: Caryophyllales
- Family: Nyctaginaceae
- Genus: Allionia
- Species: A. incarnata

Binomial name
- Allionia incarnata L.

Varieties
- A. i. var. incarnata; A. i. var. nudata; A. i. var. villosa

Synonyms
- List: Allionia bandurriae Phil.; Allionia craterimorpha Rusby; Allionia cristata (Standl.) Standl.; Allionia jarae Phil.; Allionia malacoides Benth.; Allionia mendocina Phil.; Allionia puberula Phil.; Wedelia cristata Standl.; Wedelia incarnata (L.) L.; Wedelia malachroides Benth.; Wedeliella cristata (Standl.) Cockerell; Wedeliella incarnata (L.) Cockerell

= Allionia incarnata =

Plant species in the four o'clock family

Allionia incarnata is a flowering plant in the four o'clock family (Nyctaginaceae) native to the Caribbean, the southern United States, and south through Central America and most of western South America. It is a perennial (sometimes annual) herbaceous plant with dark pink flowers. Allionia incarnata is known as pink three-flower, pink windmills, trailing allionia, trailing four-o'clock, and trailing windmills.

Three varieties are accepted:

- Allionia incarnata var. incarnata L.
- Allionia incarnata var. nudata (Standl.) Munz
- Allionia incarnata var. villosa (Standl.) B.L.Turner
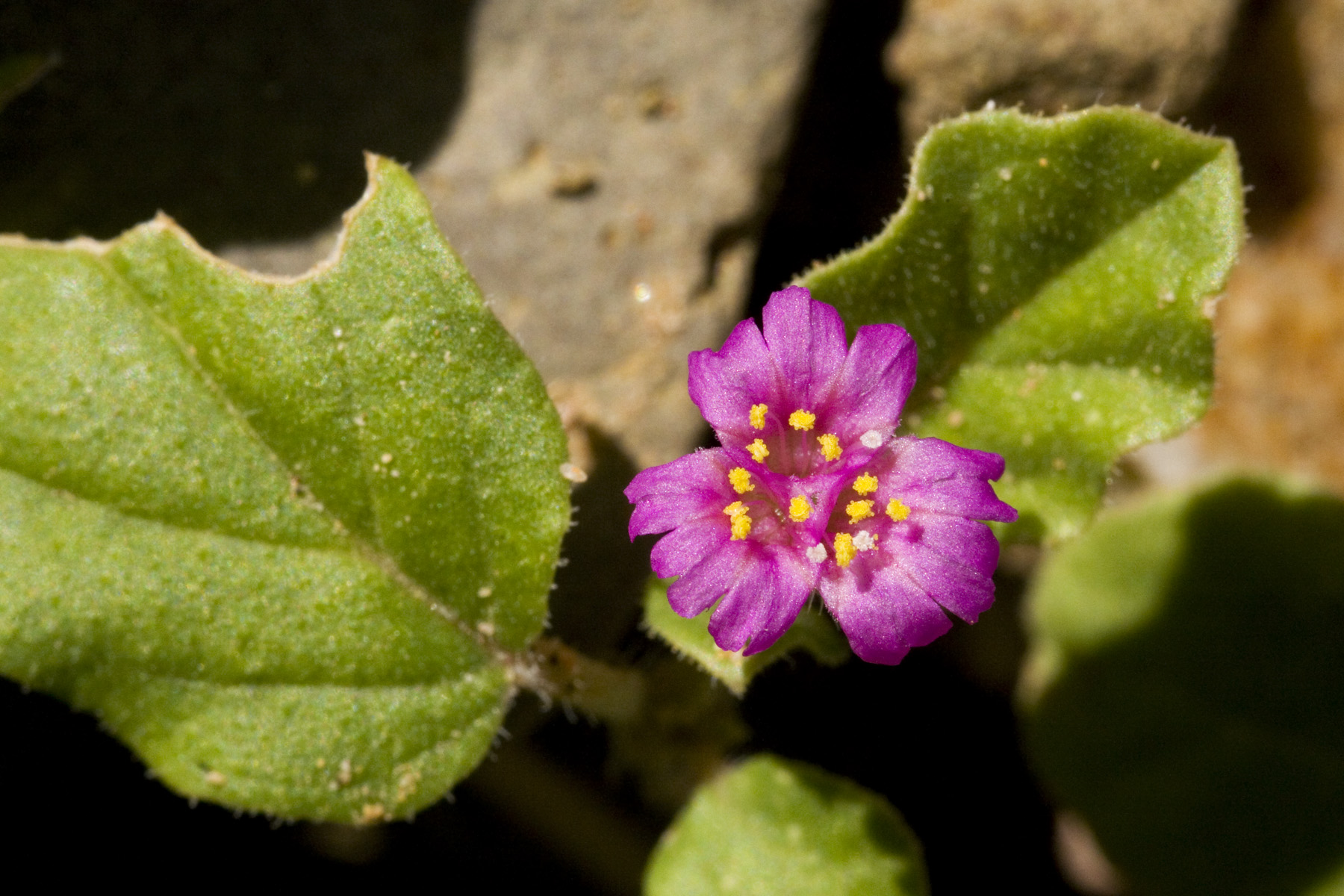
Allionia incarnata var. incarnata flower

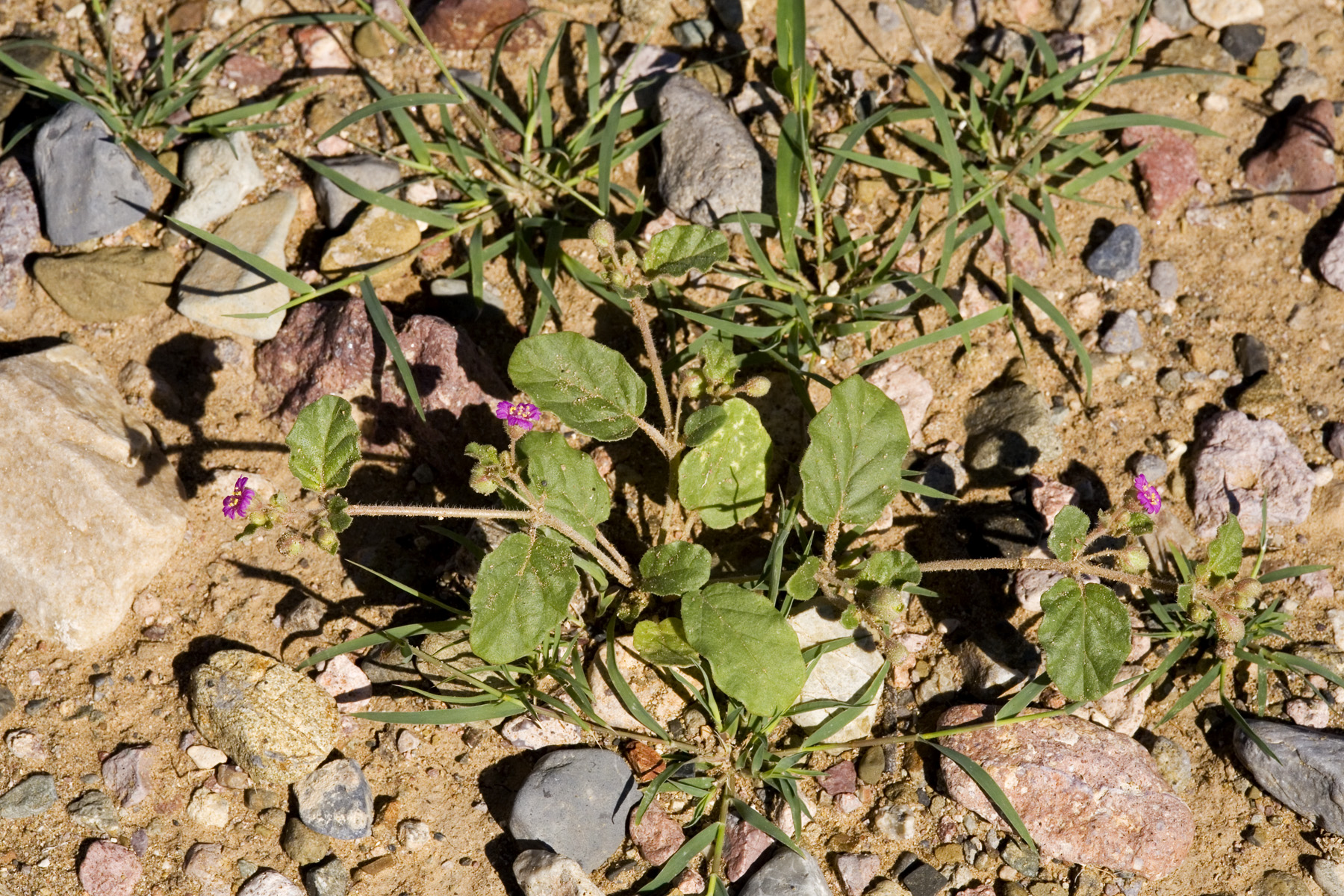
Entire plant

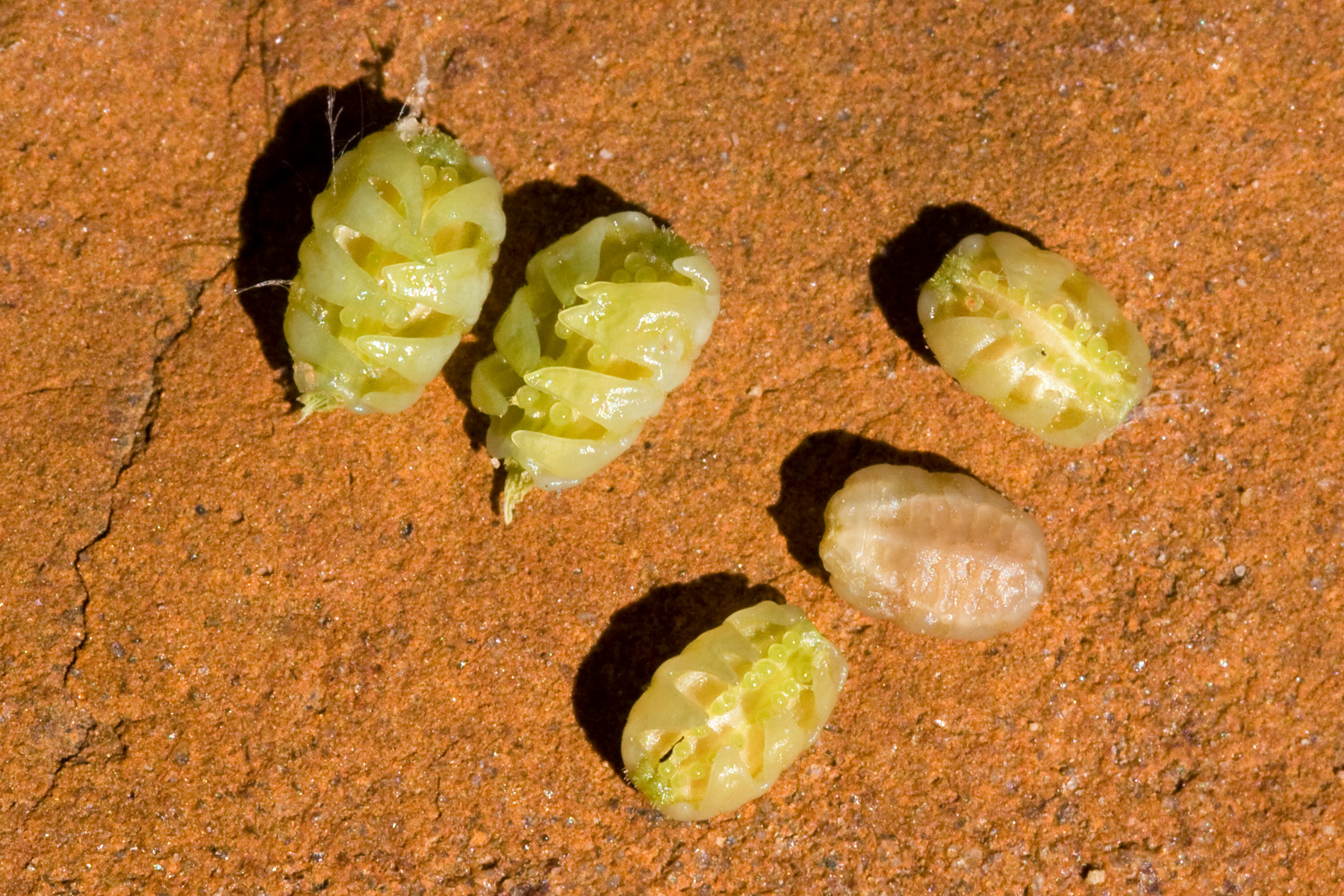
Fruits
