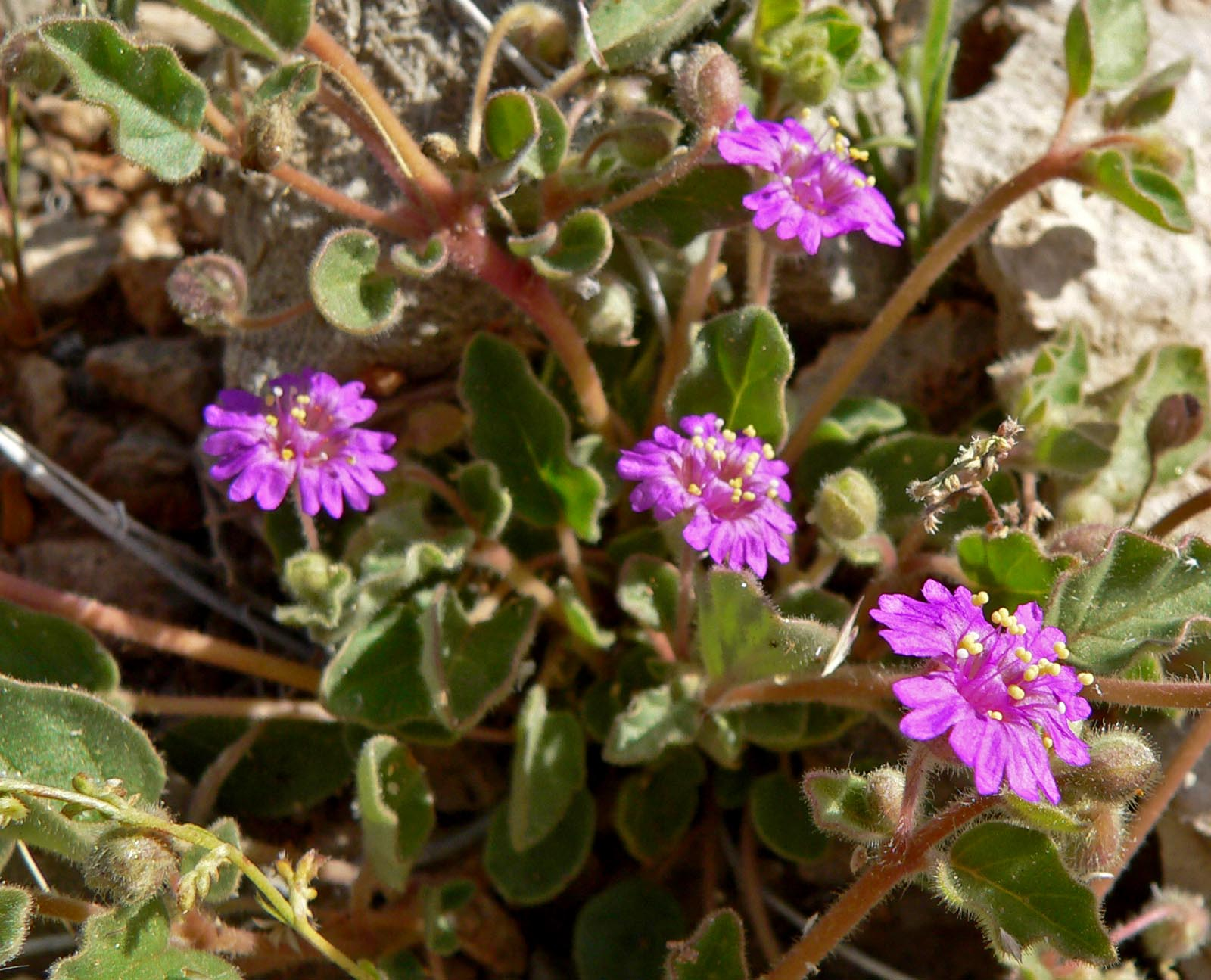
- Allionia incarnata

Scientific classification
- Kingdom: Plantae
- Clade: Tracheophytes
- Clade: Angiosperms
- Clade: Eudicots
- Order: Caryophyllales
- Family: Nyctaginaceae
- Tribe: Nyctagineae
- Genus: Allionia; L.

Species
- Allionia choisyi; Allionia incarnata

= Allionia =

Genus of flowering plants

Allionia, commonly known as windmills or trailing four o'clock, is a genus of two plant species widespread in the Western Hemisphere. Both species are unusual in their blooms, which consist of three separate flowers appearing to be a single flower.

The plants are finely pubescent annuals or short-lived perennials, with trailing, recumbent stems up to one metre in length, often threading through other vegetation. The leaves range from oval to oblong, under 4 cm long. The inflorescences are axillary, consisting of three flowers with petals varying in color from red to purple, symmetrically arranged and superficially appearing to be a single flower 3–15 mm across. The individual flowers are bisexual and bilaterally symmetric with a distinct oblique funnel. The 5–7 stamens may be somewhat exserted, along with the style. The boat-shaped anthocarps are morphologically distinct from those of other members of their family. These fruits have five ribs and two rows of inward pointing teeth on the concave side.

Molecular evidence supports Allionia as sister to the least inclusive clade containing both Boerhavia and Cyphomeris.

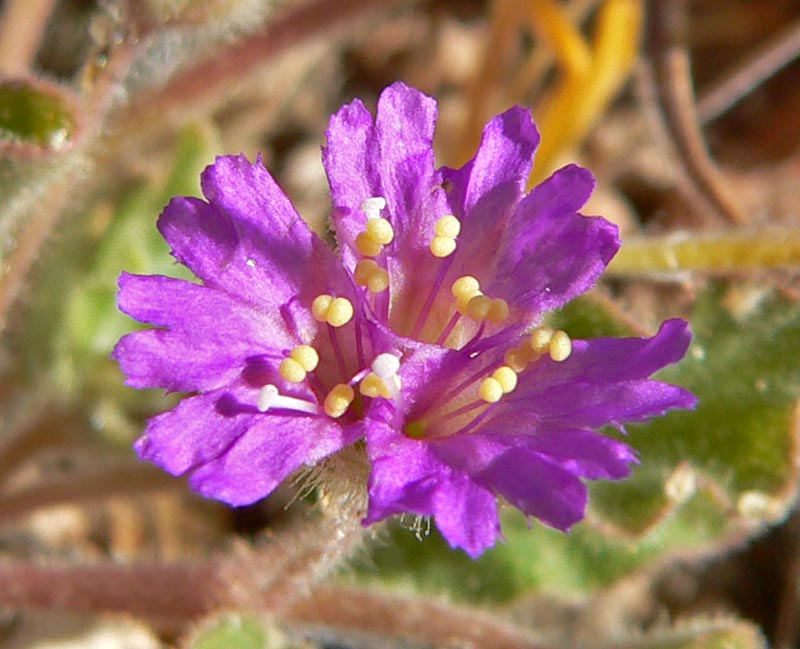
Close-up showing triple arrangement of the flowers

The range of Allionia incarnata L. includes North America, the West Indies, Central America, and South America, while Allionia choisyi Standley is more restricted in North America, occurring only in Arizona, Utah, New Mexico, and Texas. The two species can only be reliably distinguished by characteristics of their fruits, and even those may be found intergraded where the species' ranges overlap. Carl Linnaeus named the genus after Italian botanist Carlo Allioni (1725–1804).
