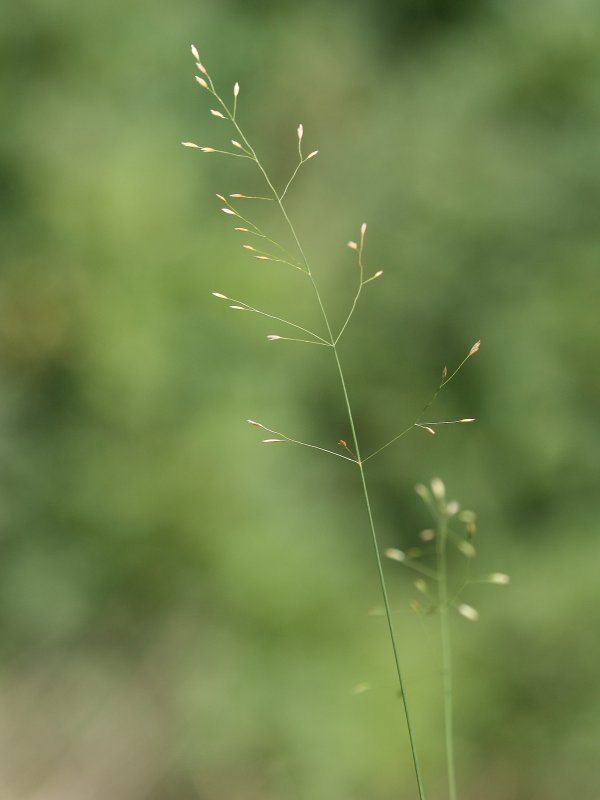

Conservation status
- Least Concern (IUCN 3.1)

Scientific classification
- Kingdom: Plantae
- Clade: Tracheophytes
- Clade: Angiosperms
- Clade: Monocots
- Clade: Commelinids
- Order: Poales
- Family: Poaceae
- Subfamily: Pooideae
- Genus: Poa
- Species: P. palustris

Binomial name
- Poa palustris L.

= Poa palustris =

Species of grass

Poa palustris (fowl bluegrass, fowl meadowgrass, swamp meadowgrass, woodland bluegrass) is a species of grass native to Asia, Europe and Northern America. This plant is used as fodder and forage, and it also used for erosion control or revegetation.
