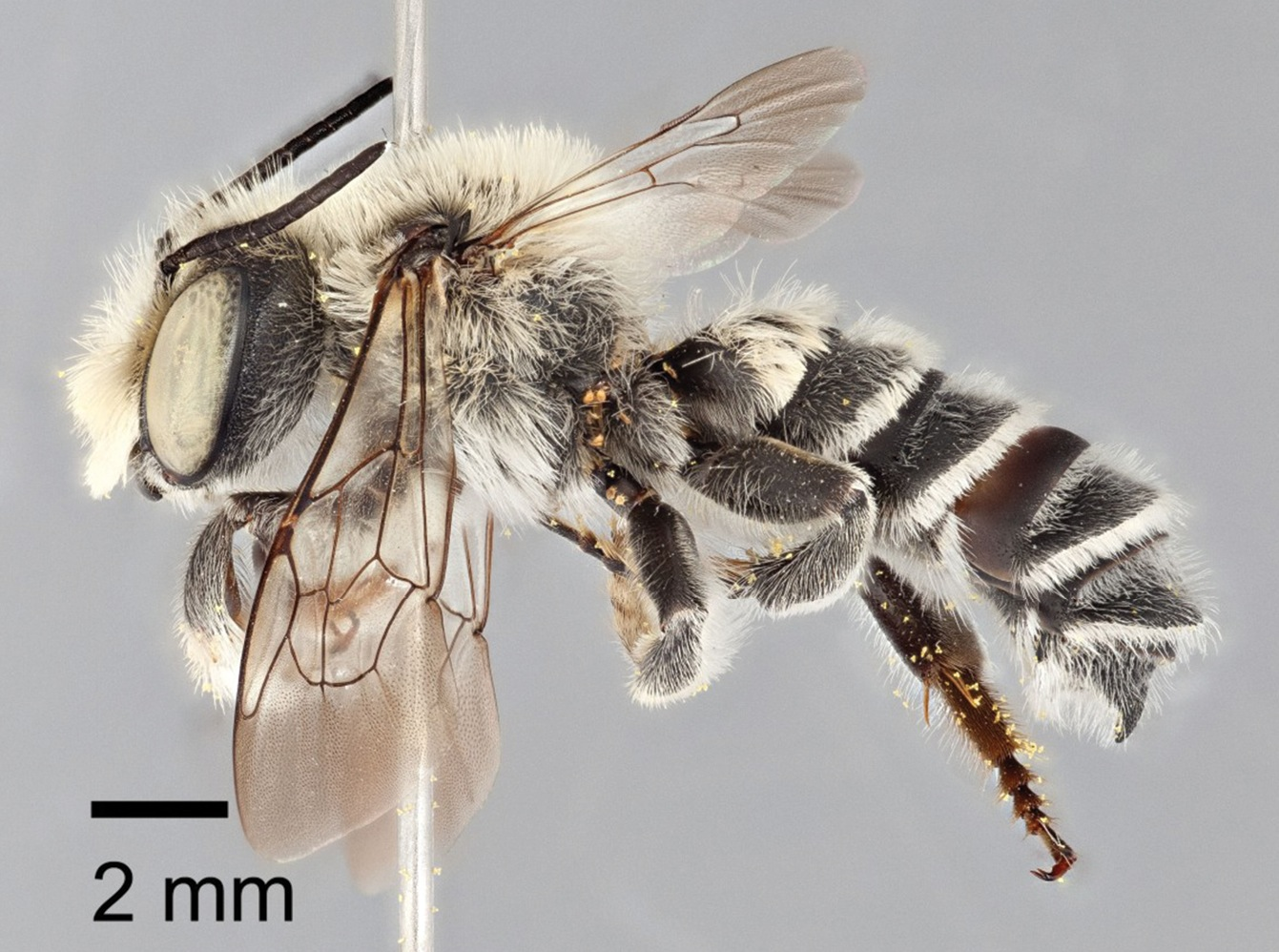
- Male (holotype)
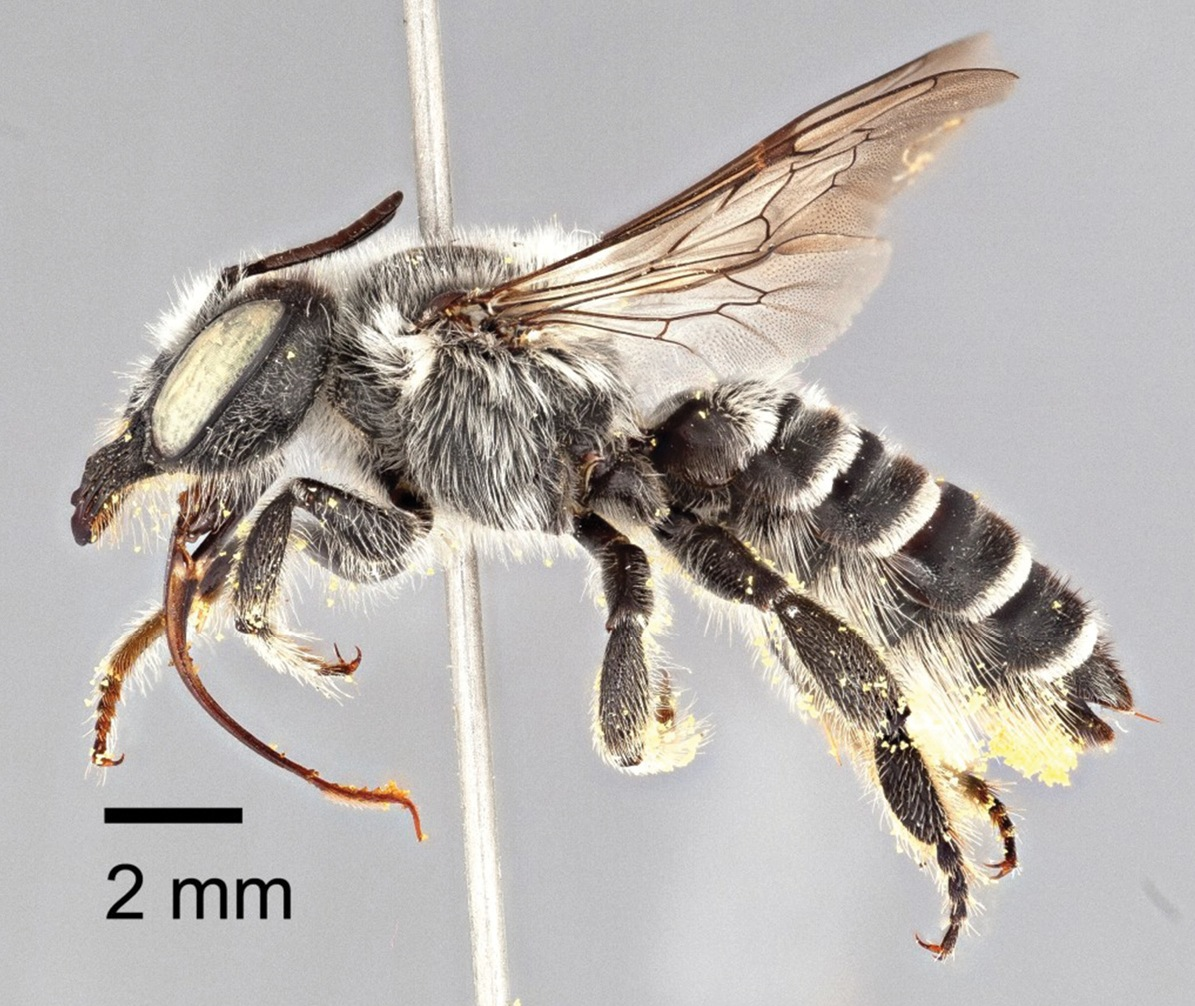
- Female (paratype)

Scientific classification
- Kingdom: Animalia
- Phylum: Arthropoda
- Clade: Pancrustacea
- Class: Insecta
- Order: Hymenoptera
- Family: Megachilidae
- Genus: Megachile
- Subgenus: Megachiloides
- Species: M. chomskyi

Binomial name
- Megachile chomskyi Sheffield, 2013
- Locations where M. chomskyi specimens in the type series were collected. Type locality is in orange.

= Megachile chomskyi =

Species of bee

Megachile (Megachiloides) chomskyi is a species of leafcutter bee found in Texas. It is in the oenotherae species group. It is likely a specialist pollinator of plants in the family Onagraceae. Cory S. Sheffield described the species in 2013 and named the specific name in honor of Noam Chomsky.

== Taxonomic history ==
Royal Saskatchewan Museum entomologist Cory S. Sheffield wrote the species description for M. chomskyi in a 2013 paper in the journal ZooKeys. Sheffield concurrently published the specimen data via GBIF's Integrated Publishing Toolkit.

All nineteen of the M. chomskyi specimens Sheffield based his description on were provided by Jack Neff of the Central Texas Melittological Institute. Neff and Allan W. Hook collected most of the specimens. In all there were two male specimens and seventeen female specimens: one male was designated the holotype, one female was designate an allotype, and the rest were designated paratypes. Neff had initially identified these specimen as all being M. amica. Sheffield placed M. chomskyi in the oenotherae species group of the subgenus Megachiloides, which also includes M. amica, M. oenotherae, and M. umatillensis.

The specific name chomskyi honors Noam Chomsky. Sheffield wrote he commemorated Chomsky "for his many academic achievements and contributions as a linguist, philosopher, cognitive scientist, historian, political critic, activist and global champion of human rights and freedoms". Sheffield also has stated that he has been "a huge fan and follower of his writings, lectures, and political views for a long time". The magazine Science News included Megachile chomskyi in its list of "unusual new species names of 2013", and the Israeli newspaper Haaretz included this species in a 2016 article listing taxa named after Jews.

== Distribution ==
M. chomskyi is found in the American state of Texas. The type locality, where the holotype was collected, is in Winkler County. Other counties specimens were collected include Ward County, Kleberg County, and Travis County. Collection areas included the Monahans Sandhills State Park on the border of Ward and Winkler Counties. Sheffield has suggested that the range might extend to Arizona and Kansas, raising the possibility that some specimens identified as M. amica might in fact be M. chomskyi.

== Description and diagnosis ==
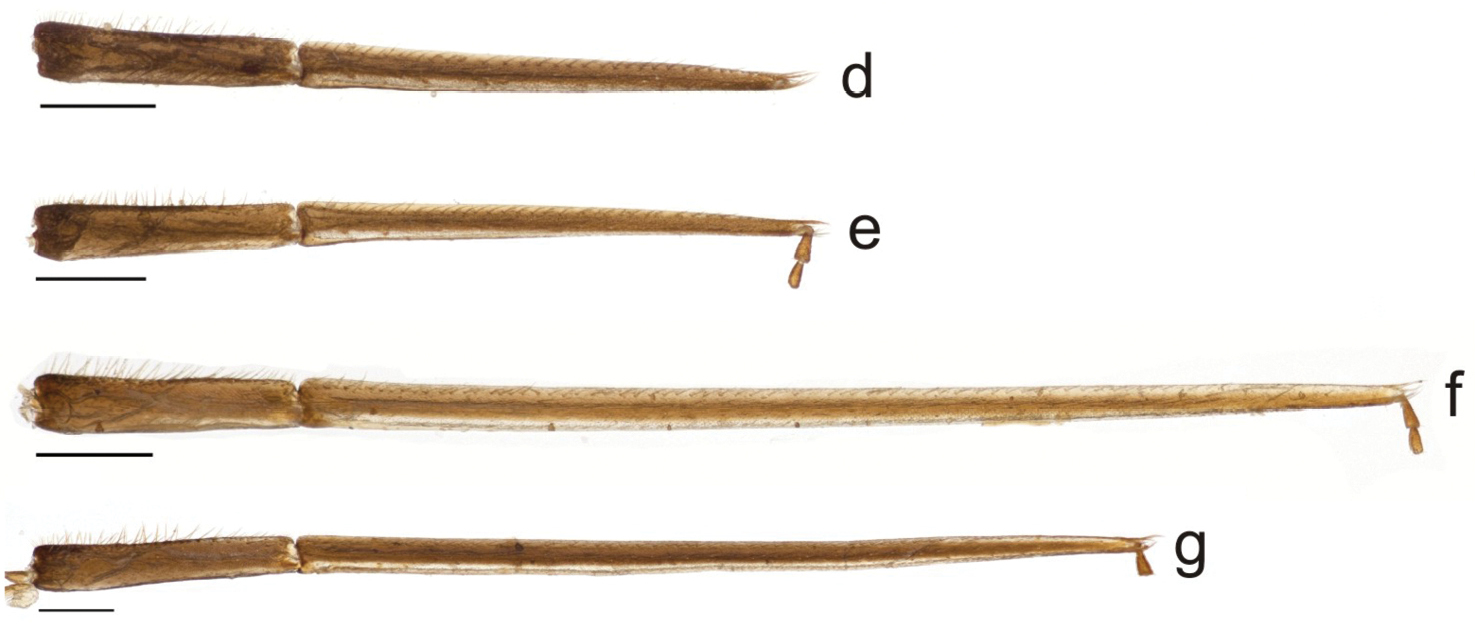
Tongues of: (d) M. amica; (e) M. chomskyi; (f) M. oenotherae; and (g) M. umatillensis. (Note: Scale bar represents 0.5 mm (0.020 in). Tongues have different scales so that the basal palpomeres (on left) are all the same size.)

Species in the oenotherae group have long tongues, although M. chomskyi's tongue is not as long as those of M. umatillensis and M. oenotherae. Both sexes of M. chomskyi have a tongue length of 7.2 mm (0.28 in), making it more than half the length of the body. For both sexes, the tongue's first palpomere is 55% the length of the second.

M. chomskyi is most morphologically similar to M. amica. However, M. chomskyi are larger than M. amica and M. oenotherae so their body length can be used as a diagnostic. The body length is 13 mm (0.51 in) for males and 13–13.5 mm (0.51–0.53 in) for females. Males have a forewing length of 10 mm (0.39 in) while females have a forewing length of 8.5 mm (0.33 in). The females of M. chomskyi and M. amica can also be distinguished by their hair. The dark pubescence on female M. chomskyi is composed entirely of short hair, whereas the dark hair on M. amica is of varied lengths.

== Biology ==
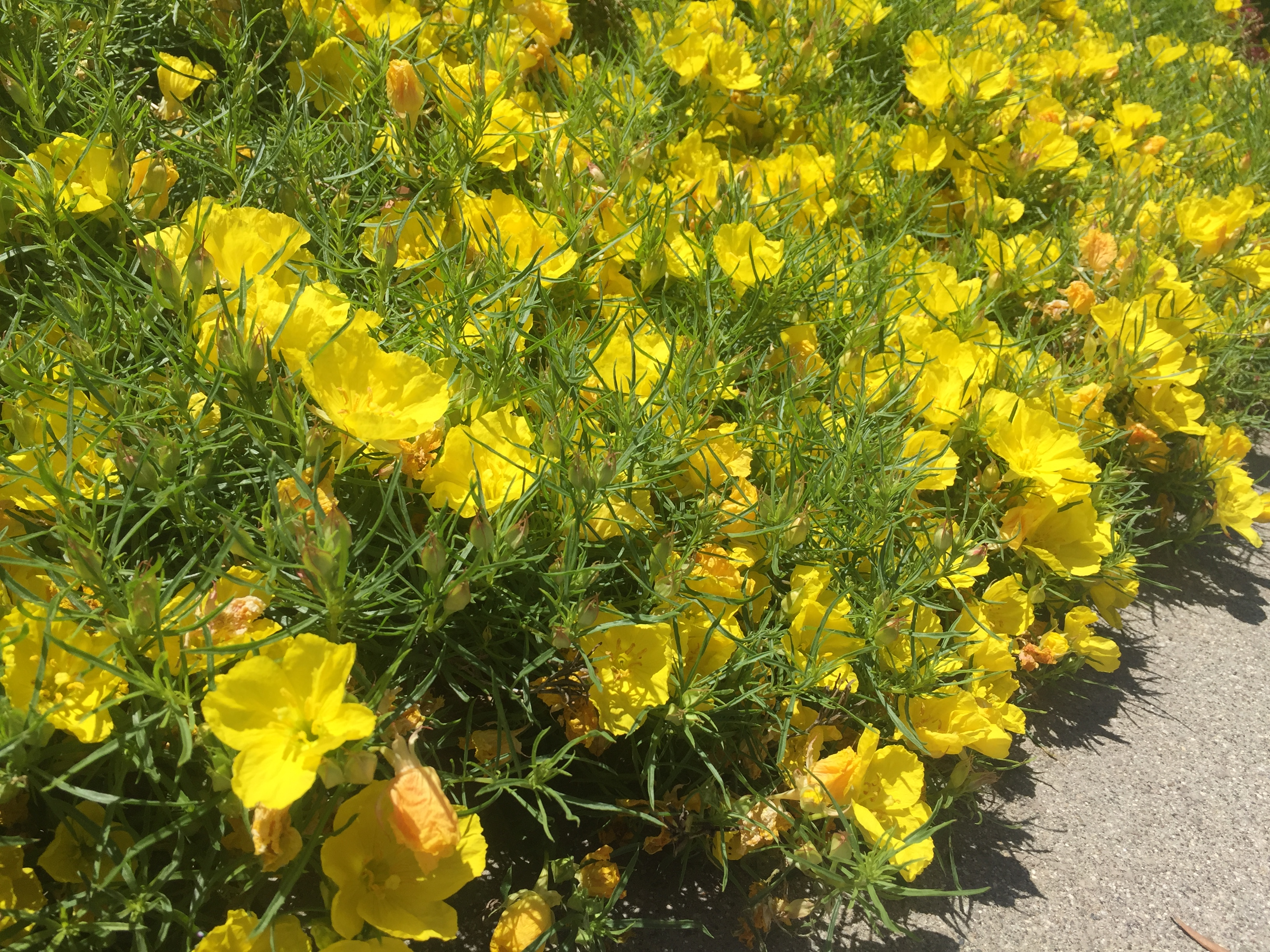
C. hartwegii flowers (Hartweg's sundrops)

Fifteen specimens of M. chomskyi were collected on the flowers of Calylophus hartwegii (Hartweg's sundrops, Hartweg evening primrose) and one was collected from the flowers of Oenothera drummondii. Sheffield suggests that, like other members of the oenotherae species group, M. chomskyi is oligolectic, exclusively pollinating plants in the family Onagraceae. The M. chomskyi specimens were collected as early as late April and as late as June.

== Conservation status ==
In 2016, NatureServe gave M. chomskyi a conservation status of "GU", denoting they could not assign a conservation rank due to insufficient data.

== Genetics ==
An analysis of the Cytochrome oxidase I gene showed a 7.8% difference between M. chomskyi and M. amica; each species had intraspecific variation of less than 0.8%.
