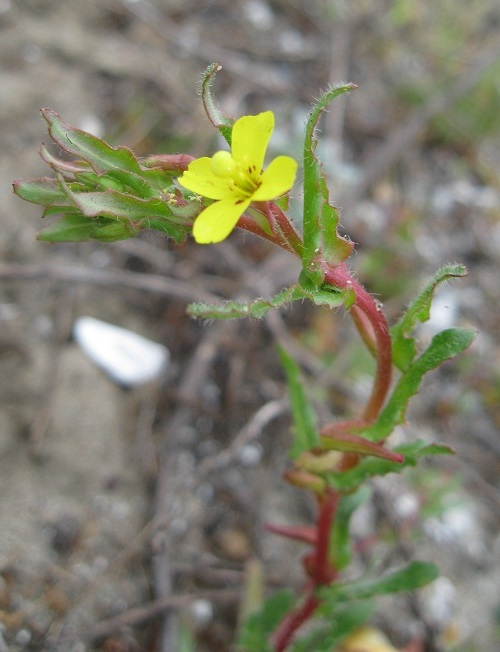

Scientific classification
- Kingdom: Plantae
- Clade: Tracheophytes
- Clade: Angiosperms
- Clade: Eudicots
- Clade: Rosids
- Order: Myrtales
- Family: Onagraceae
- Genus: Camissoniopsis
- Species: C. lewisii

Binomial name
- Camissoniopsis lewisii (P.H.Raven) W.L.Wagner & Hoch

Synonyms
- Camissonia lewisii P.H.Raven

= Camissoniopsis lewisii =

Species of flowering plant

Camissoniopsis lewisii is a species of evening primrose known by the common name Lewis' evening primrose. It is native to southern California and Baja California, where it grows in coastal habitat and on the grasslands of the inland mountain ranges. as an example occurrence in Baja California, C. lewisii occurs in association with Mimulus aridus and Adiantum jordanii.

== Description ==
This is an annual herb producing a hairy stem up to about half a meter long which may be erect and unbranched or spreading along the ground and branching. The leaves are arranged in a basal rosette and are several centimeters long; there are also leaves along the stem. The nodding inflorescence produces flowers with yellow petals a few millimeters long with one or two red spots at the bases. The fruit is coiled and one to two centimeters long.
