= Beach evening primrose =

Beach evening-primrose or beach evening primrose is a common name for multiple plant species and may refer to:

- Camissoniopsis cheiranthifolia
- Oenothera drummondii
