= C. intermedia =

C. intermedia may refer to:

- Camissonia intermedia, the intermediate suncup, a plant species native to California and Baja California
- Cattleya intermedia, the intermediate cattleya, an orchid species
- Cavia intermedia, the Santa Catarina's Guinea pig or Moleques do Sul Guinea pig, a mammal species found in Brazil on the small island of Moleques do Sul in the state of Santa Catarina
- Clathrina intermedia, a sponge species
- Clidemia intermedia, a flowering plant species in the genus Clidemia
- Corymbia intermedia, the pink bloodwood, a plant species native to Queensland and New South Wales
- Crepis intermedia, the limestone hawksbeard, a flowering plant species native to western North America
- Cryptantha intermedia, the common cryptantha, clearwater cryptantha and nievitas, a wildflower species native from British Columbia to Baja California
- Cucullia intermedia, the dusky hooded owlet, intermediate cucullia, goldenrod cutworm or intermediate hooded owlet, a moth species found in North America
- Cunninghamella intermedia, a fungus species
- Cyclopia intermedia, the honeybush, a plant species used to make an infusion in the same manner as tea in the southwest and southeast of South Africa

== Synonyms ==
- Caecilia intermedia, a synonym for Caecilia nigricans, an amphibian species found in Colombia, Ecuador and Panama

== See also ==
- Intermedia (disambiguation)
