= C. maritima =

C. maritima may refer to:

- Cakile maritima, the European searocket, a common plant species
- Calendula maritima, the sea marigold, a very rare plant species
- Calidris maritima, the purple sandpiper, a small shorebird species
- Cicindela maritima, a ground beetle species native to Europe
- Coreopsis maritima, the sea dahlia or beach coreopsis, a plant species
- Crambe maritima, the sea kale, a halophytic perennial plant that grows wild along the coasts of Europe

== Synonyms ==
- Canavalia maritima, a synonym for Canavalia rosea, the beach bean, bay bean, seaside bean, coastal jackbean or MacKenzie bean
- Cattleya maritima, a synonym for Cattleya intermedia
- Cineraria maritima, a synonym for Jacobaea maritima, also commonly known as Senecio cineraria, a plant species
- Clypeola maritima, a synonym for Lobularia maritima, a plant species

== See also ==
- Maritima (disambiguation)
