= Small evening primrose =

Small evening primrose is a common name for several flowering plants and may refer to:

- Camissoniopsis micrantha, endemic to California
- Eremothera minor (syn. Camissonia minor)
- Oenothera perennis, native to the eastern United States and Canada
