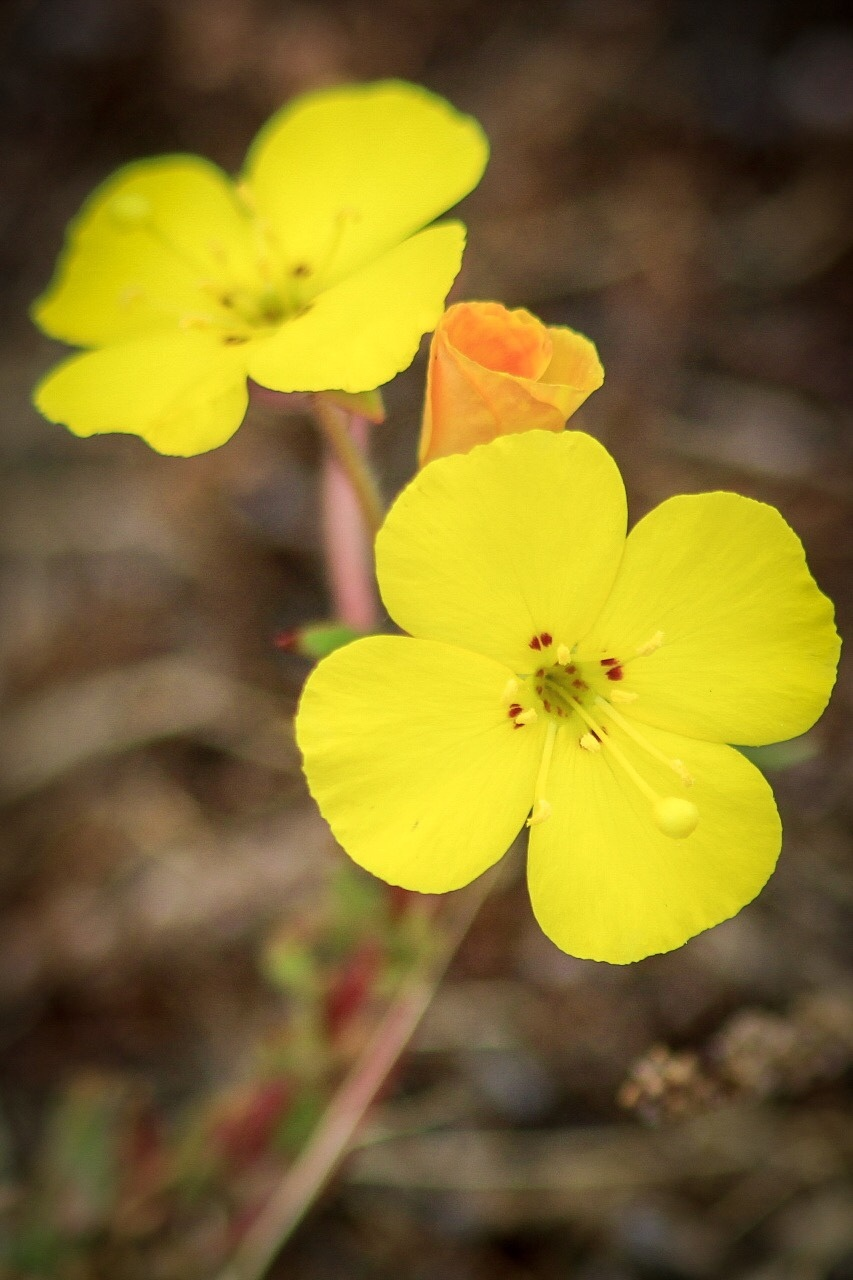

Conservation status
- Vulnerable (NatureServe)

Scientific classification
- Kingdom: Plantae
- Clade: Tracheophytes
- Clade: Angiosperms
- Clade: Eudicots
- Clade: Rosids
- Order: Myrtales
- Family: Onagraceae
- Genus: Camissoniopsis
- Species: C. bistorta

Binomial name
- Camissoniopsis bistorta (Nutt. ex Torr. & A.Gray) W.L.Wagner & Hoch

Synonyms
- Camissonia bistorta (Nutt. ex Torr. & A.Gray) P.H.Raven; Oenothera bistorta Nutt. ex Torr. & A.Gray; Sphaerostigma bistortum (Nutt. ex Torr. & A.Gray) Walp.

= Camissoniopsis bistorta =

Species of flowering plant

Camissoniopsis bistorta is a species of flowering plant in the evening primrose family known by the common names southern suncup and California suncup. It is native to southern California and Baja California, where it grows in several types of plant community along the coast and in the coastal hills and mountain ranges. This is a hairy annual or short-lived perennial herb spreading from a basal rosette, with stems reaching up to 80 centimeters long. The leaves are narrow and sometimes toothed, and 1 to 12 centimeters in length. Toward the end of the spreading stems are nodding inflorescences of flowers, each flower with four bright yellow petals dotted with red at their bases.

== Description ==
This herbaceous plant grows as an annual or short-lived perennial. It can be found in a wide range of sizes, with the young plants having a mean size of approximately 2 to 3 cm (0.79 to 1.18 in). It is covered in strigose or spreading hairs. The plant is occasionally simple, but most often several stems are present. The slender stems are prostrate or decumbent to relatively ascending, reaching 50 to 80 cm (20 to 31 in) in length, with older epidermis peeling.

The leaves are alternately-arranged and measure 1.2 to 12 cm (0.47 to 4.72 in) long. Sometimes the leaves have a constriction on them, giving them a spatulate end with less hair. The basal leaves arise on petioles up to 4 cm (1.6 in) from a rosette, and are shaped narrowly elliptic. The cauline leaves tend to be (sub)sessile, and are generally shaped lanceolate, with the margins being minutely dentate (toothed) to roughly entire (smooth).

The inflorescence is a spike that is nodding in bud. The hairs on the inflorescence are short and erect. The flowers are self-incompatible, and open at dawn. The hypanthium is 2 to 6 mm (0.079 to 0.236 in) long. There are 4 sepals, which are 5 to 8 mm (0.20 to 0.31 in) long. There are 4 yellow, fading red petals, which are 7 to 15 mm (0.28 to 0.59 in) long, with 1 to 2 red spots near the base. There are 8 stamens, with the anthers attached at the middle. The stigma exceeds the anthers and is held well above them at anthesis. The fruits measure 12 to 40 mm (0.47 to 1.57 in) in length, and 1.5 to 2.5 mm (0.059 to 0.098 in) in width. The fruits are more or less quadrangular, and are generally straight or slightly wavy and twisted. The seeds are 0.9 to 1 mm (0.035 to 0.039 in) large.

== Taxonomy ==
The type specimen was collected by Thomas Nuttall on his 1836 voyage to San Diego. The name bistorta means "twice-twisted," referring to the fact that the fruit does a double turn. Phylogenetic analysis place this species in a clade with Camissoniopsis hirtella and Camissoniopsis cheiranthifolia. It hybridizes with C. cheiranthifolia subsp. suffruticosa.

== Distribution and habitat ==
This species is native to California in the United States and Baja California in Mexico. In California, it is found in the southwestern portion of the state, from Kern and Ventura counties south to San Diego County and inland to the Peninsular Ranges and Transverse Ranges. In Baja California, this species is found from the border to inland to Tecate south to the Colonet area. Hybrids with Camissoniopsis cheiranthifolia are found on Pacific beaches between Tijuana and Ensenada.

This species is commonly found growing in sandy fields near the coast, but is also found in clay soils in grasslands to openings in coastal sage scrub and chaparral. In some locations in San Diego County, it occurs with deceptively similar looking (when young) rare plants such as Chorizanthe orcuttiana and Mucronea californica.

== Gallery ==
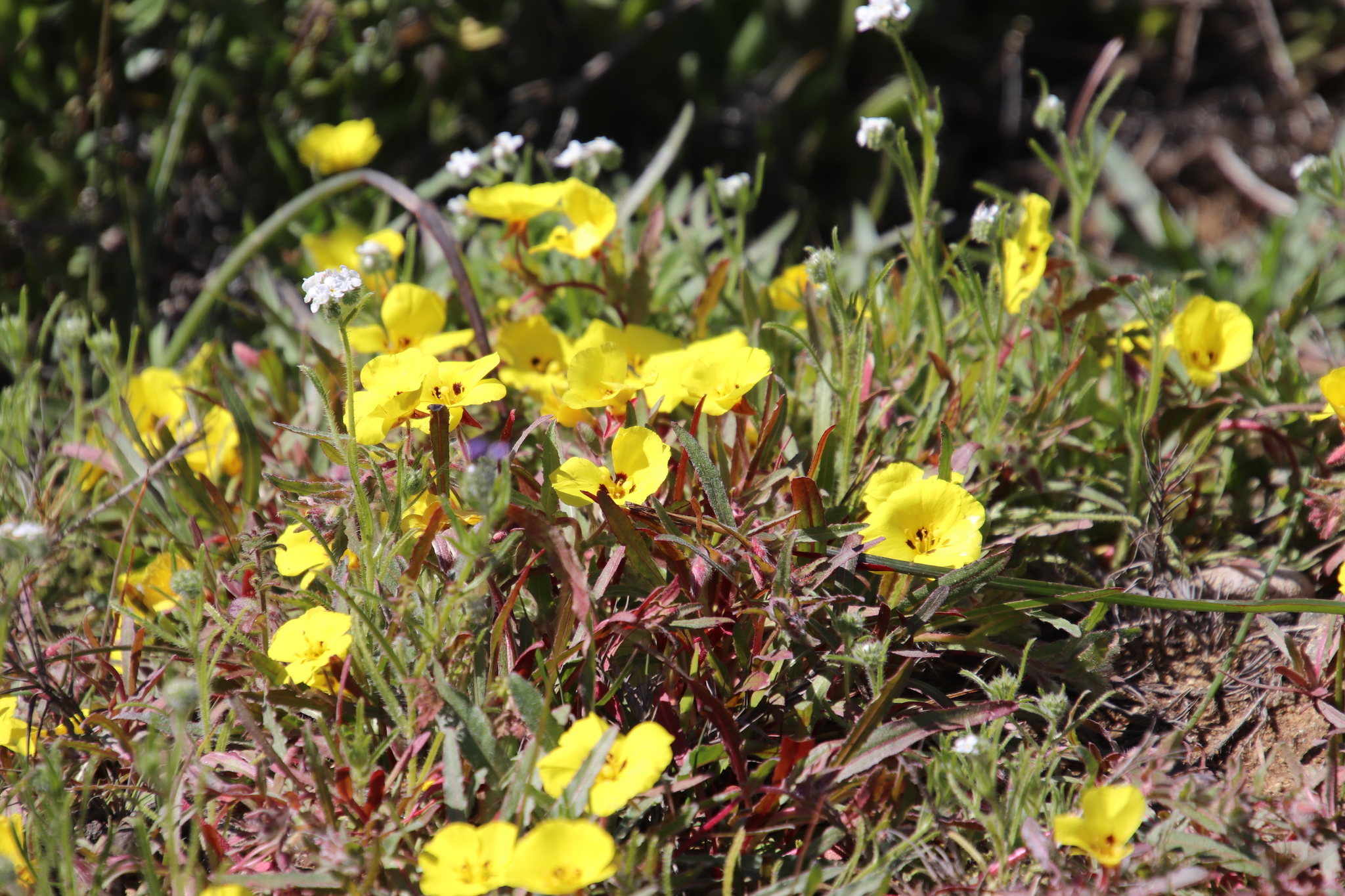
The flowers on their stalks

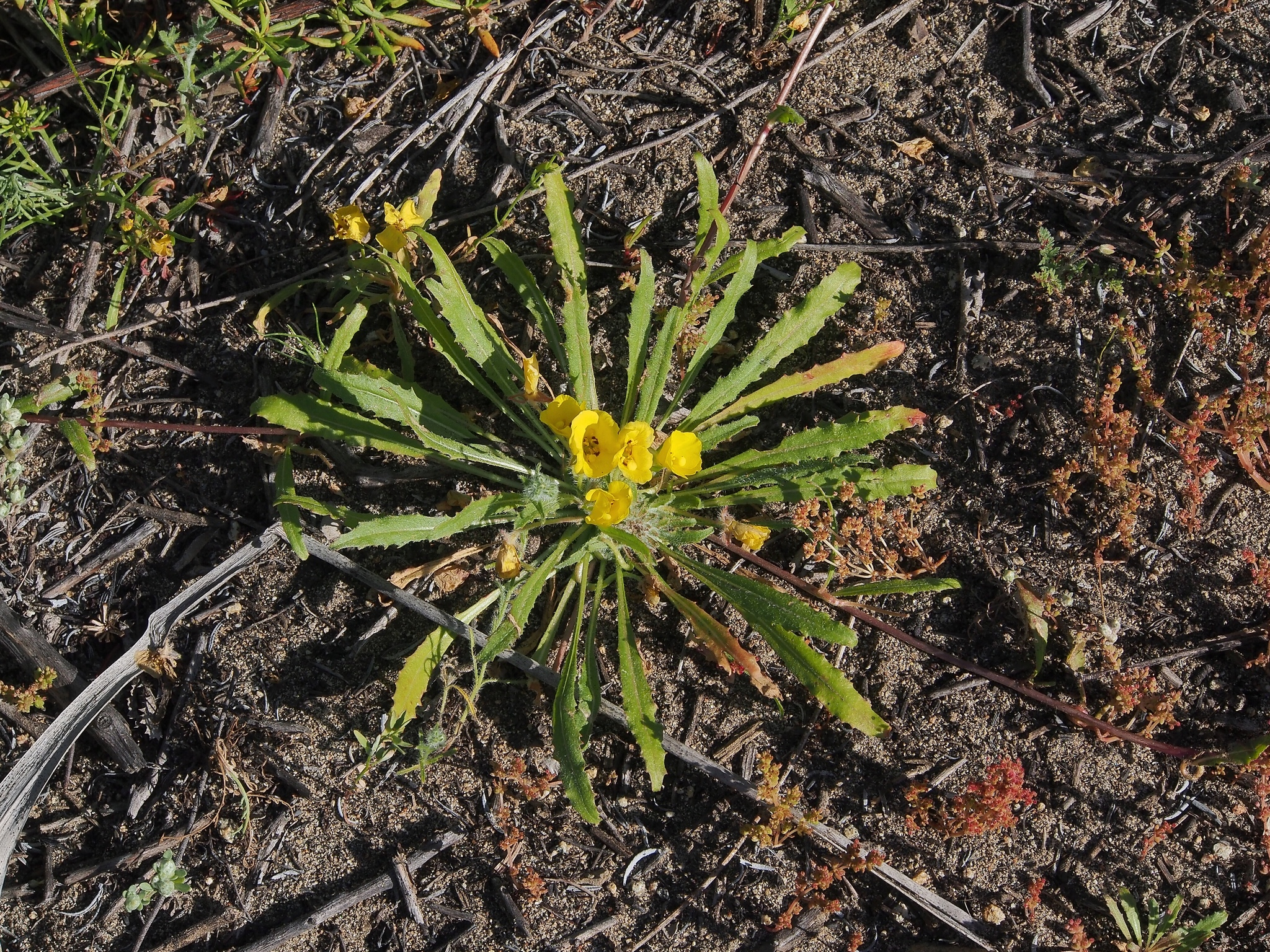
The characteristic rosette

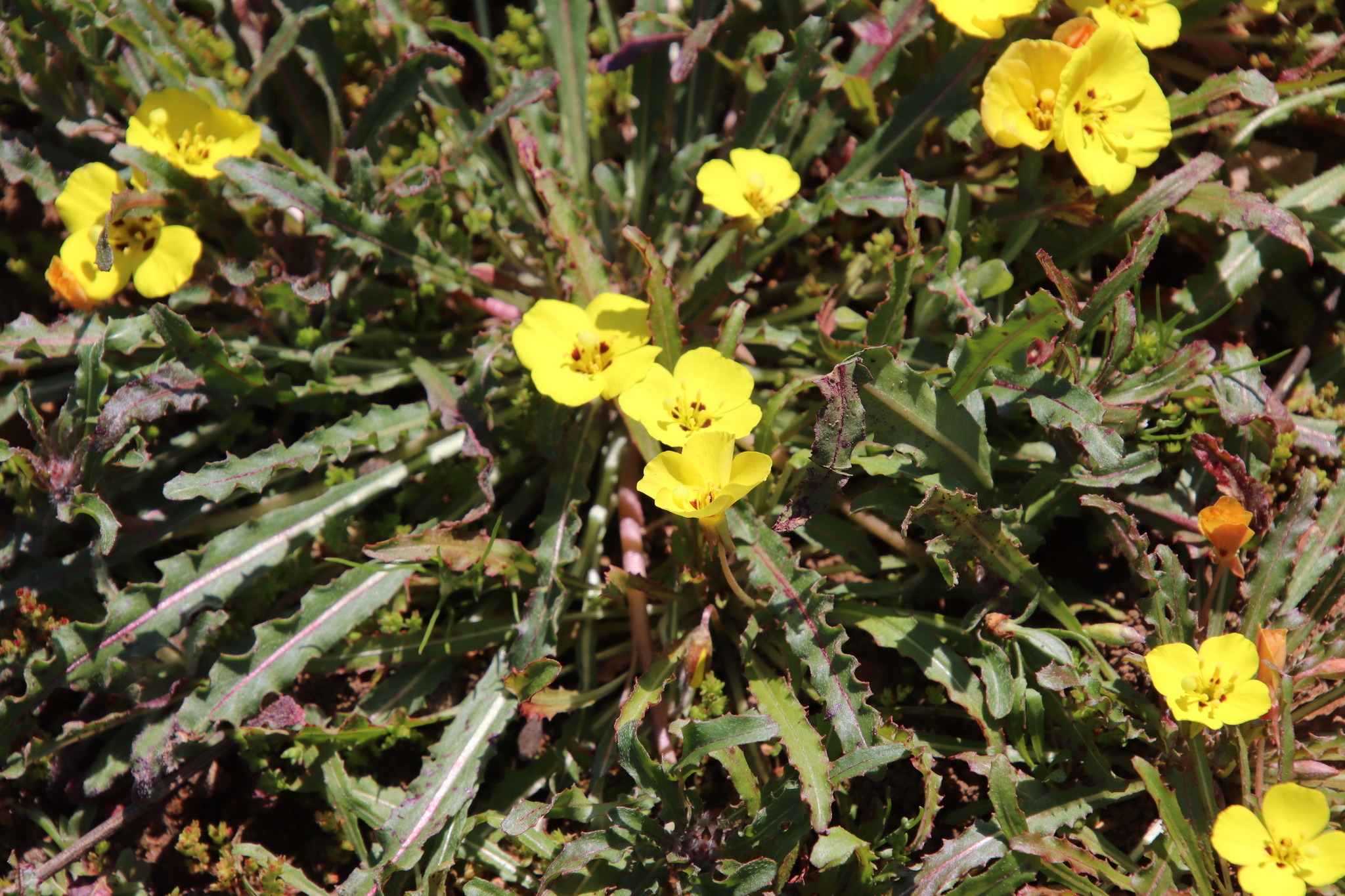
The plant with numerous inflorescences and flowers

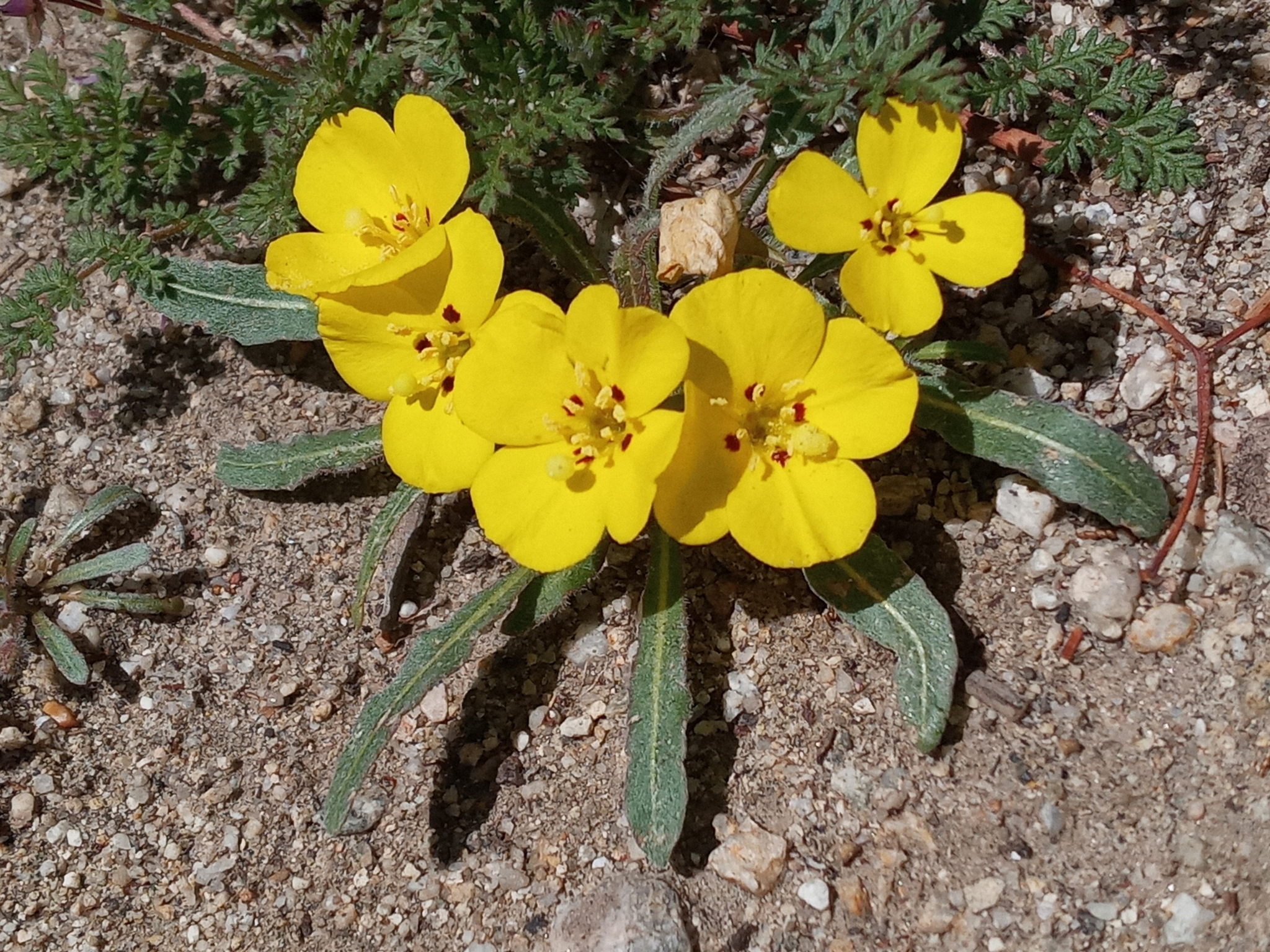
Flowers over a basal rosette of leaves

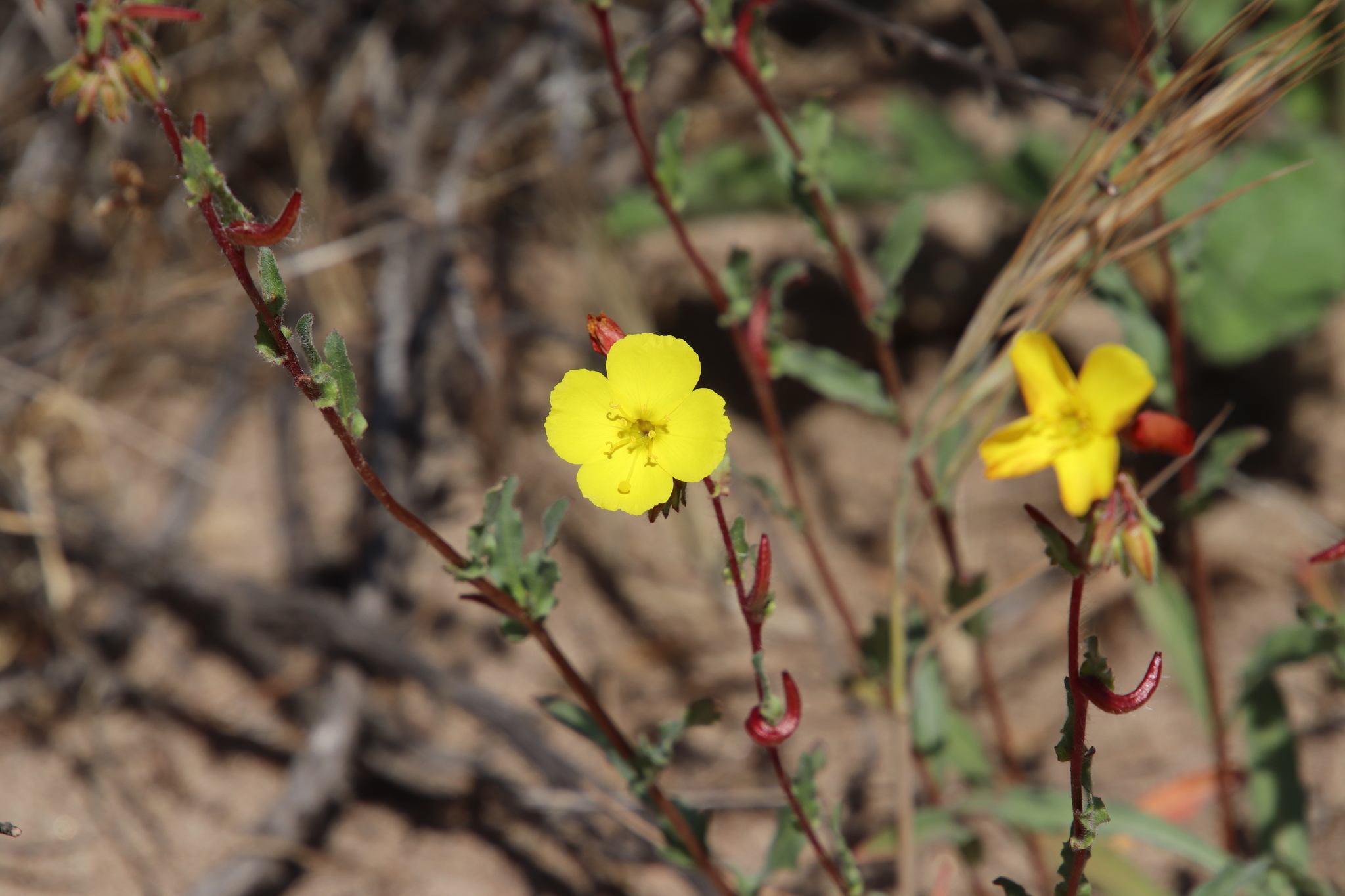
Flowers on ascending stems
