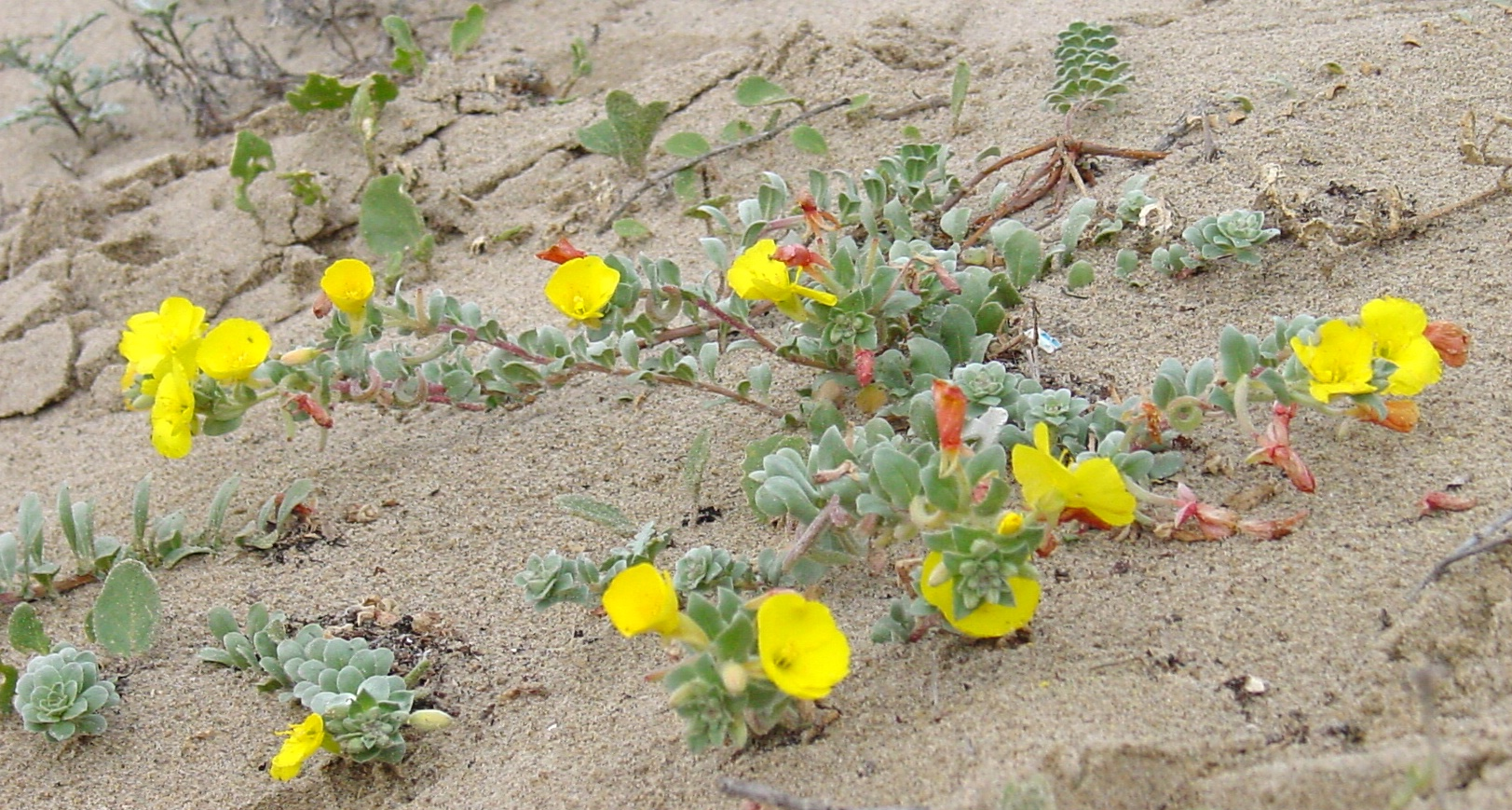

Scientific classification
- Kingdom: Plantae
- Clade: Tracheophytes
- Clade: Angiosperms
- Clade: Eudicots
- Clade: Rosids
- Order: Myrtales
- Family: Onagraceae
- Genus: Camissoniopsis
- Species: C. cheiranthifolia

Binomial name
- Camissoniopsis cheiranthifolia (Hornem. ex Spreng.) W.L.Wagner & Hoch

Synonyms
- Agassizia cheiranthifolia (Hornem. ex Spreng.) Spach; Camissonia cheiranthifolia (Hornem. ex Spreng.) Raim.; Holostigma cheiranthifolium (Hornem. ex Spreng.) Spach; Oenothera cheiranthifolia Hornem. ex Spreng.

= Camissoniopsis cheiranthifolia =

Species of flowering plant

Camissoniopsis cheiranthifolia, the beach suncup or beach evening primrose, is a species of the evening primrose family and is native to open dunes and sandy soils of coastal California, Baja California and Oregon.

== Description ==
The beach suncup grows prostrate along the beach surface, forming mats more than 1 m across. It forms long stems growing from a central crown, lined with silvery grey-green leaves. The prostrate form and swinging stems allow the plant to survive well on the windy, shifting sands of the coast. The four-petalled flowers open in the morning (typical among suncups) and are bright yellow, fading to reddish.

== Taxonomy ==
This plant is a well-defined diploid (2n = 14) species that has varying floral traits over its geographic distribution.

The specific epithet cheiranthifolia refers to the leaves having the appearance of Cheiranthus, an old name for a wallflower genus.

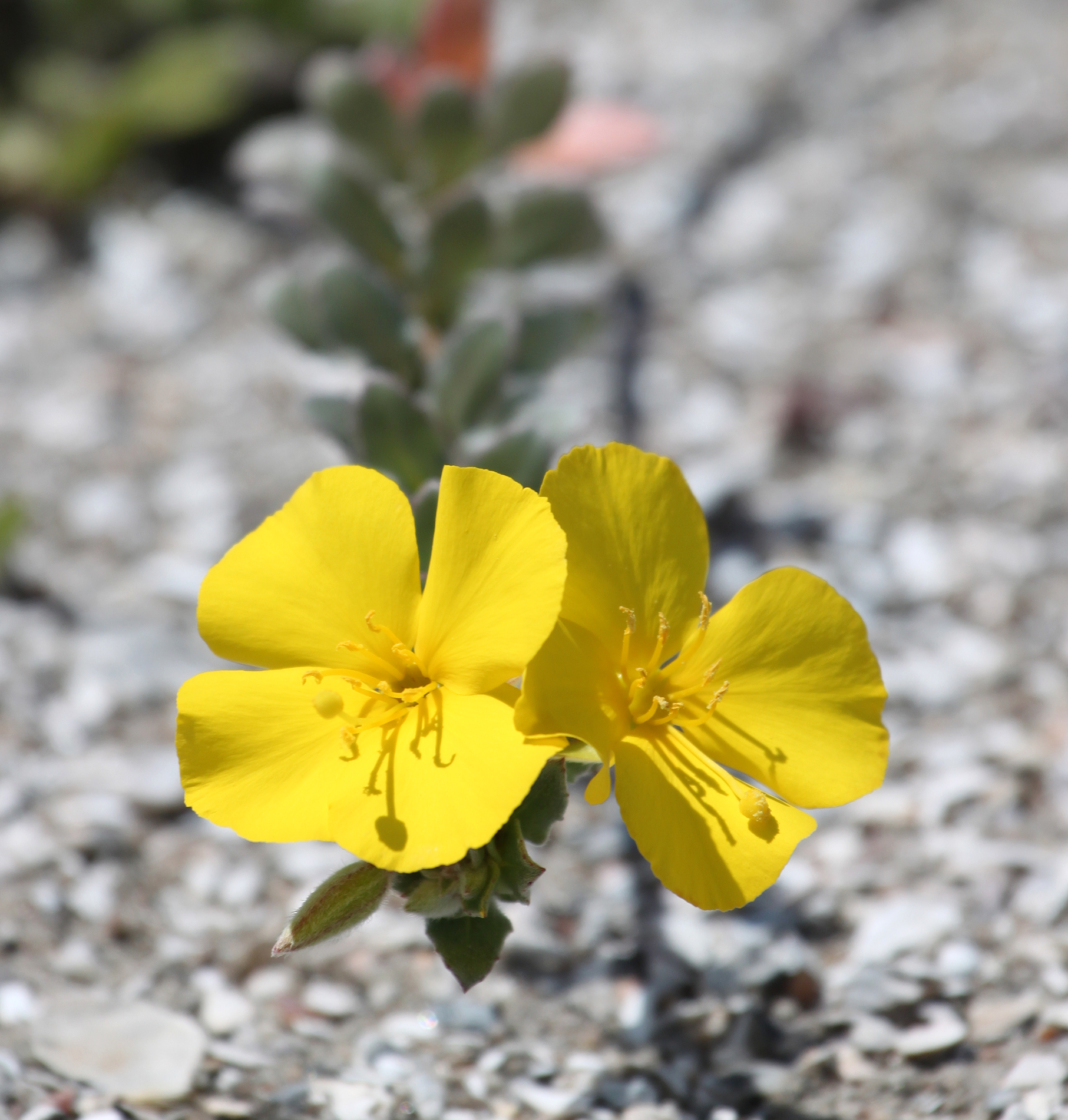
Beach evening primrose flowers

The two subspecies are:

- Camissoniopsis cheiranthifolia subsp. cheiranthifolia – A perennial herb that rarely has dense and silvery hairs, distributed from the Channel Islands to Oregon. This subspecies is generally self-pollinated.
- Camissoniopsis cheiranthifolia subsp. suffruticosa (S.Watson) W.L.Wagner & Hoch – A subshrub that generally has dense and silvery hairs, distributed from Baja California to Point Conception. This species is usually cross-pollinated and self-incompatible, and it hybridizes widely with Camissoniopsis bistorta.

== Distribution and habitat ==
This species grows on the coastal dunes and sandy soils from southern Oregon through California and southwards towards El Rosario in Baja California.
