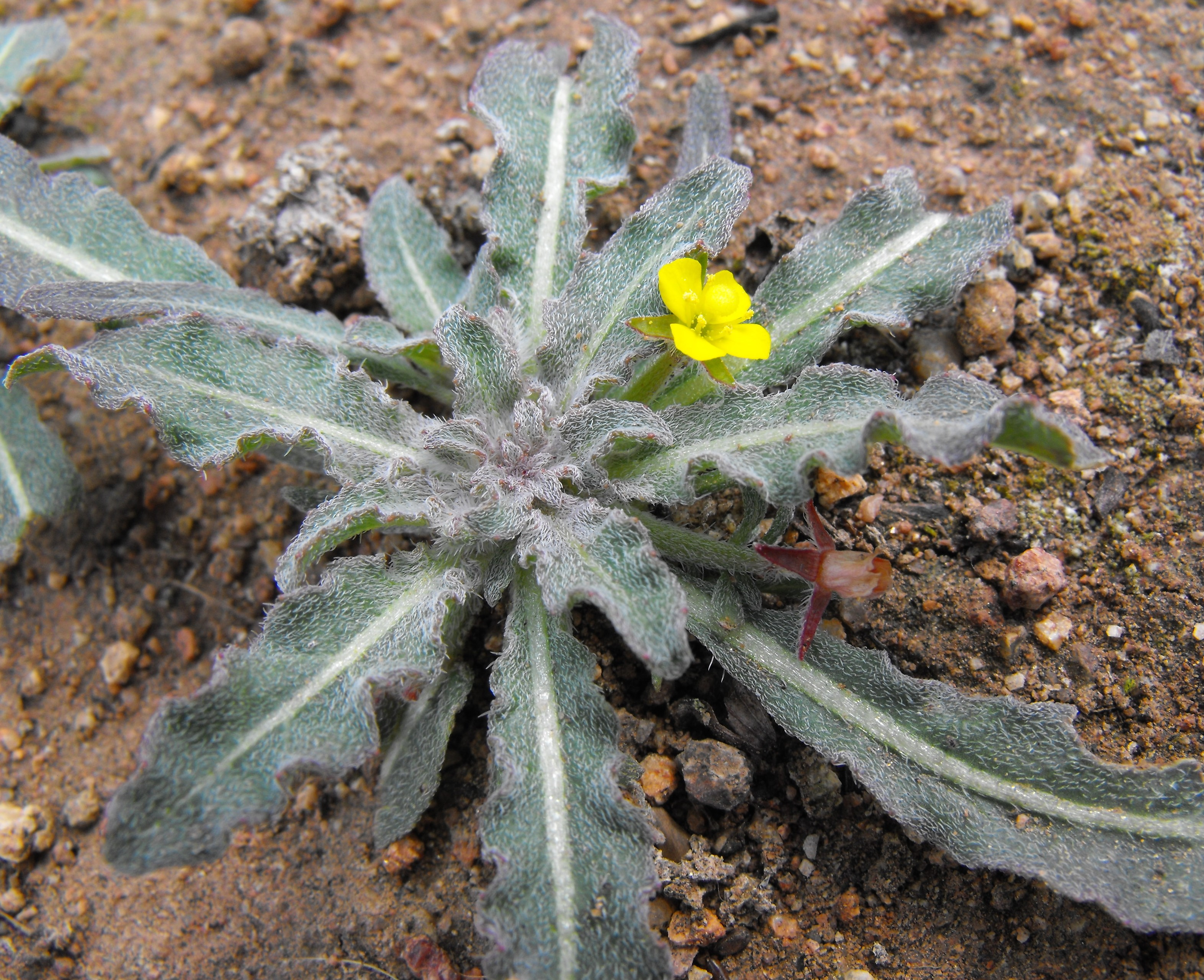

Conservation status
- Vulnerable (NatureServe)

Scientific classification
- Kingdom: Plantae
- Clade: Tracheophytes
- Clade: Angiosperms
- Clade: Eudicots
- Clade: Rosids
- Order: Myrtales
- Family: Onagraceae
- Genus: Camissoniopsis
- Species: C. micrantha

Binomial name
- Camissoniopsis micrantha (Hornem. ex Spreng.) W.L.Wagner & Hoch

Synonyms
- Camissonia micrantha (Hornem. ex Spreng.) P.H.Raven; Holostigma micranthum (Hornem. ex Spreng.) Spach; Oenothera micrantha Hornem. ex Spreng.; Sphaerostigma micranthum (Hornem. ex Spreng.) Walp.

= Camissoniopsis micrantha =

Species of flowering plant

Camissoniopsis micrantha is a species of flowering plant in the evening primrose family known by the common names miniature suncup or small evening primrose. This is a small, hairy annual herb producing a basal rosette of leaves. It is characterized by small yellow flowers with petals less than 5 millimeters long. The flowers dry to a reddish color as they close. This species is found in Arizona and California in the United States, along with Baja California in Mexico. It grows in sandy areas in a number of habitats, from beaches to inland slopes. It is the smallest member of the genus Camissoniopsis.

== Description ==
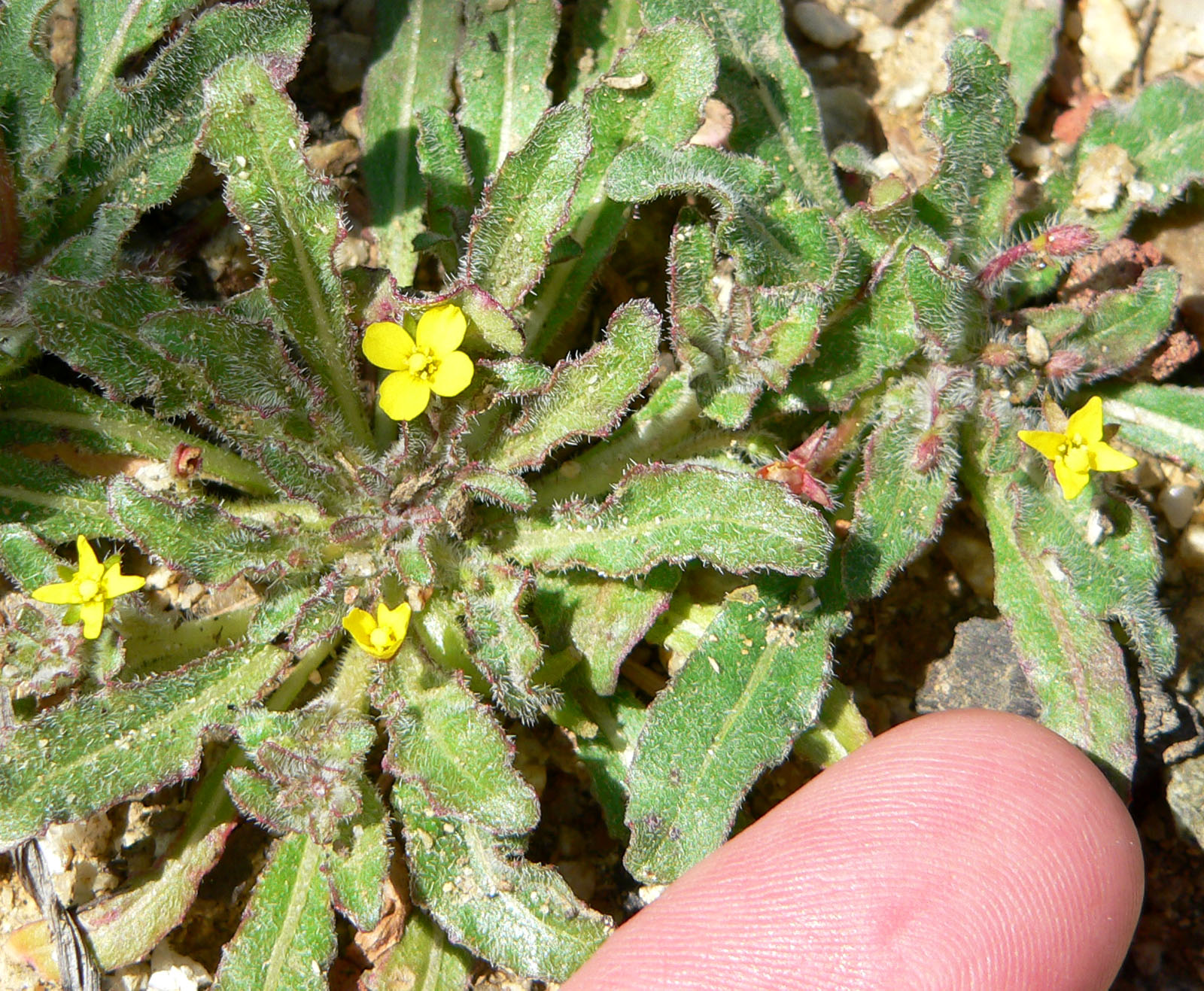
In comparison with a human finger

This species is an annual herbaceous plant that forms a basal rosette of leaves. It is covered in dense, grayish, spreading hairs. The stems are decumbent and branched or erect and simple, and are usually less than 60 cm (24 in) long. The dark green leaves are 1 to 12 cm (0.39 to 4.72 in) long. The basal (on the rosette) leaves are the largest. The cauline leaves are generally shaped narrowly lanceolate, with minutely dentate (toothed) margins, and are sessile.

Like other members of the genus, the inflorescence is a spike which is nodding in bud. The hairs on the inflorescence are non-glandular. The flowers have a hypanthium 1.2 to 2 mm (0.047 to 0.079 in) long. The 4 sepals are 1 to 2.5 mm (0.039 to 0.098 in). The 4 yellow petals are 1.4 to 4.5 mm (0.055 to 0.177 in) long, with up to 2 red spots near the base. The fruits are 13 to 25 mm (0.51 to 0.98 in) long by 1.1 to 1.8 mm (0.043 to 0.071 in) wide, shaped cylindric. The seeds are 0.7 to 1.1 mm (0.028 to 0.043 in) large.

== Distribution and habitat ==
This species is distributed in Arizona and California in the United States, and also Baja California in Mexico. In Baja California, this species is very rare and is only found near Ojos Negros and San Quintín.

This species can be found growing in canyons, coastal dunes, beaches, sandy fields, and washes.
