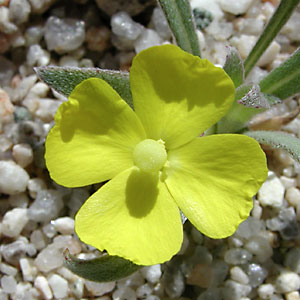

Conservation status
- Vulnerable (NatureServe)

Scientific classification
- Kingdom: Plantae
- Clade: Tracheophytes
- Clade: Angiosperms
- Clade: Eudicots
- Clade: Rosids
- Order: Myrtales
- Family: Onagraceae
- Genus: Camissoniopsis
- Species: C. pallida

Binomial name
- Camissoniopsis pallida (Abrams) W.L.Wagner & Hoch

Synonyms
- Camissonia pallida (Abrams) P.H.Raven; Sphaerostigma pallidum Abrams

= Camissoniopsis pallida =

Species of flowering plant

Camissoniopsis pallida is a low growing, yellow-flowered annual plant in the evening primrose family, Onagraceae. It is known by the common names pale primrose or pale yellow suncup. It is native to the desert and scrub habitat of the region where Arizona, California, and Nevada meet. It is a roughly hairy annual herb growing in a low patch on the ground, sometimes producing an erect stem from the basal rosette. The herbage is gray-green to reddish green. The leaves are lance-shaped and up to 3 centimeters long. The nodding inflorescence produces flowers with yellow petals 2 to 13 millimeters long, each with small red markings near the bases. The fruit is a straight to tightly coiled capsule.
