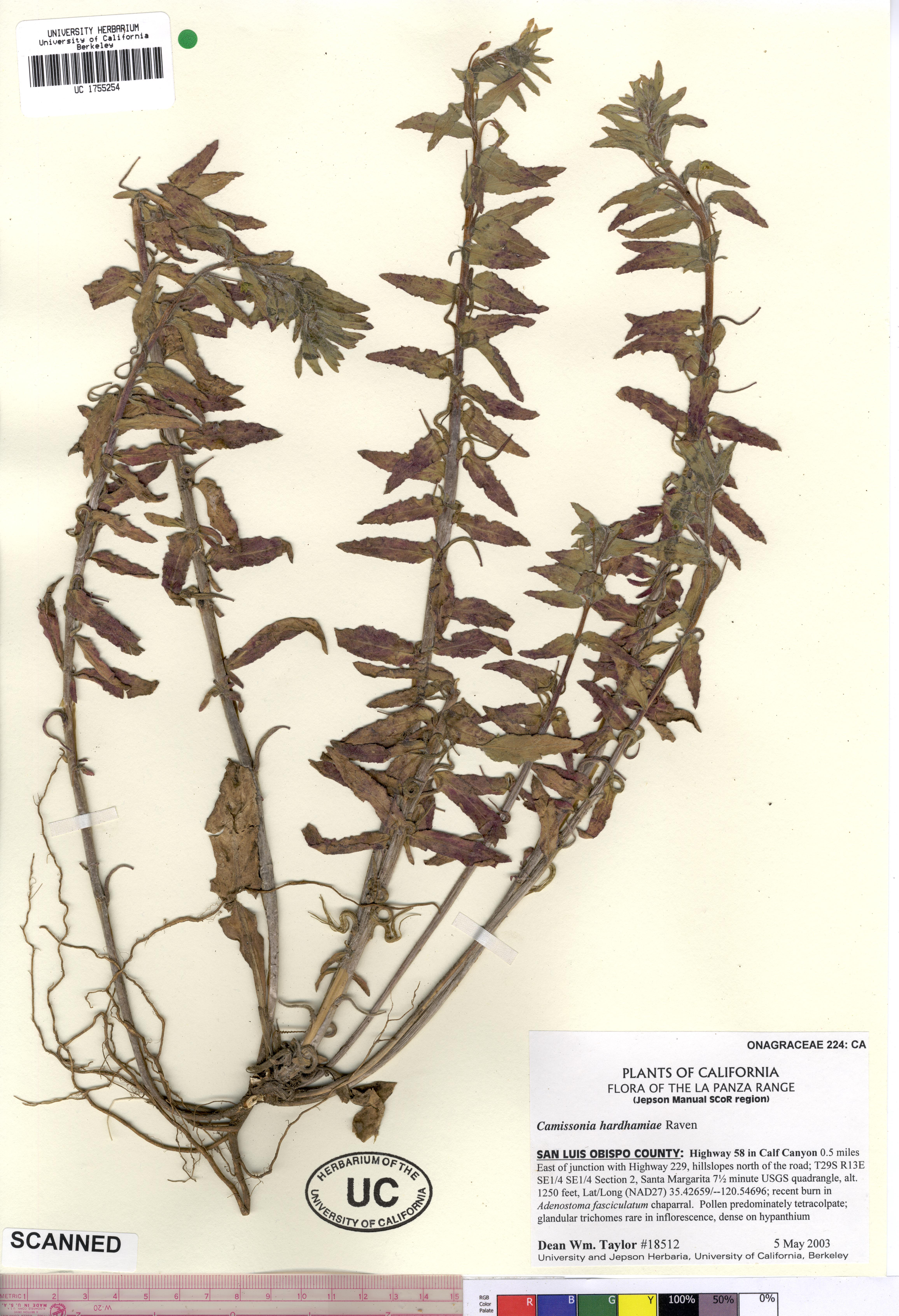

Scientific classification
- Kingdom: Plantae
- Clade: Tracheophytes
- Clade: Angiosperms
- Clade: Eudicots
- Clade: Rosids
- Order: Myrtales
- Family: Onagraceae
- Genus: Camissoniopsis
- Species: C. hardhamiae

Binomial name
- Camissoniopsis hardhamiae (P.H.Raven) W.L.Wagner & Hoch

Synonyms
- Camissonia hardhamiae P.H.Raven

= Camissoniopsis hardhamiae =

Species of flowering plant

Camissoniopsis hardhamiae is a species of evening primrose known by the common name Hardham's evening primrose. It is endemic to California, where it grows in the chaparral and woodland of San Luis Obispo and Monterey Counties. It is a robust annual herb producing a hairy stem up to about half a meter tall. The leaves are lance-shaped to narrowly oval and up to 12 centimeters long. The nodding inflorescence bears flowers with yellow petals each a few millimeters long. The fruit is a cylindrical capsule up to 2.5 centimeters long containing several dark-colored seeds.
