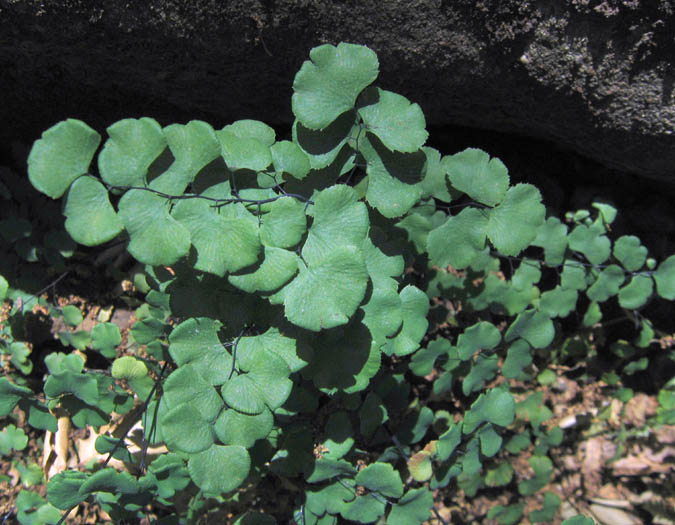

Conservation status
- Apparently Secure (NatureServe)

Scientific classification
- Kingdom: Plantae
- Clade: Embryophytes
- Clade: Tracheophytes
- Division: Polypodiophyta
- Class: Polypodiopsida
- Order: Polypodiales
- Family: Pteridaceae
- Genus: Adiantum
- Species: A. jordanii

Binomial name
- Adiantum jordanii C.H.Mull.

= Adiantum jordanii =

Species of fern

Adiantum jordanii is a perennial species of maidenhair fern, in the Vittarioideae subfamily of the Pteridaceae. The species is known by the common name California maidenhair.

It is native to California and Baja California. A. jordanii is found in the southernmost part of its range in Baja California with such flora associates as Mimulus aridus and Daucus pusillus.

Each trailing leaf may reach over half a meter in length and is made up of many rounded green segments. Each segment has two to four lobes and it may split between the lobes, the underside of each segment bearing one to four sori.

Adiantum jordanii is a carrier of the fungus-like oomycete, Phytophthora ramorum, which causes Sudden Oak Death. The USDA enforces an import control, focusing intensely on areas (CA, OR, NY in U.S.) that are infected with Sudden Oak death. When sold, they must be identified by place of origin and must also be accompanied by a phytosanitary certificate. The USDA warns to not take cuttings from wild specimens.

Adiantum jordanii, from native plant nurseries, is used in native plant and wildlife gardens.

== Uses ==
Ohlone people used the plant as a decoction to treat stomach ailments, as a blood purifier, for "pain below the shoulders", and to aid placental expulsion. In the early 1900s, it was reported that in Salinan land, indigenous people boiled the plant into a tea and consumed it to aid difficult childbirths, induce menstruation, stop hemorrhage, and for the liver.

== Culture ==
Following the colonization of California, A. jordanii came to be known by the Spanish name culantrillo, a diminutive of culantro. Its use by Californios in blood disorders and menstrual regulation is similar to the use of the related A. capillus-veneris, also called culantrillo, which Cephas L. Bard described as a practice introduced to California from the rest of Mexico. As a medicinal plant, it forms a part of the ethnobotany of indigenous people in its range, including Ohlone, Salinan, and possibly Chumash people. Culantrillo is one of the herbs whose uses by indigenous Californians were documented and compiled in the early 1900s by Andreu Garriga, a parish priest who administered the then abandoned San Antonio de Padua Mission.
