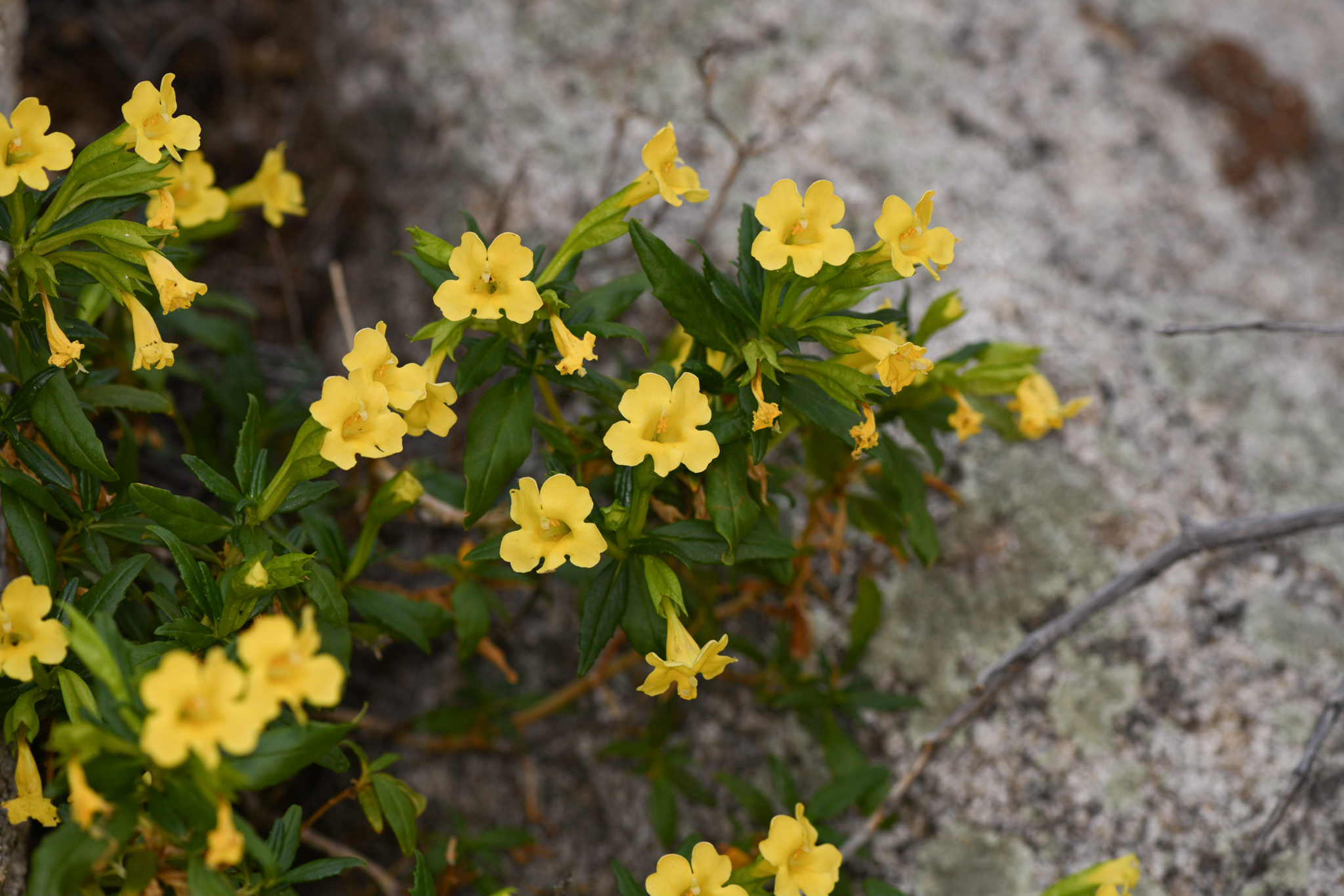
- San Diego County, California, 2022

Conservation status
- Apparently Secure (NatureServe)

Scientific classification
- Kingdom: Plantae
- Clade: Embryophytes
- Clade: Tracheophytes
- Clade: Angiosperms
- Clade: Eudicots
- Clade: Asterids
- Order: Lamiales
- Family: Phrymaceae
- Genus: Diplacus
- Species: D. aridus

Binomial name
- Diplacus aridus Abrams

Synonyms
- Diplacus aurantiacus var. aridus (Abrams) D.J.Keil; Mimulus aridus (Abrams) A.L.Grant; Mimulus aurantiacus var. aridus (Abrams) D.M.Thomps.

= Diplacus aridus =

Species of flowering plant

Diplacus aridus, is a species of monkeyflower with yellow blossoms. It was formerly known as Mimulus aridus.

== Distribution ==
This species is native to San Diego County in Southern California, and to Baja California. In Baja California, Mimulus aridus occurs in association with Daucus pusillus and Adiantum jordanii.
