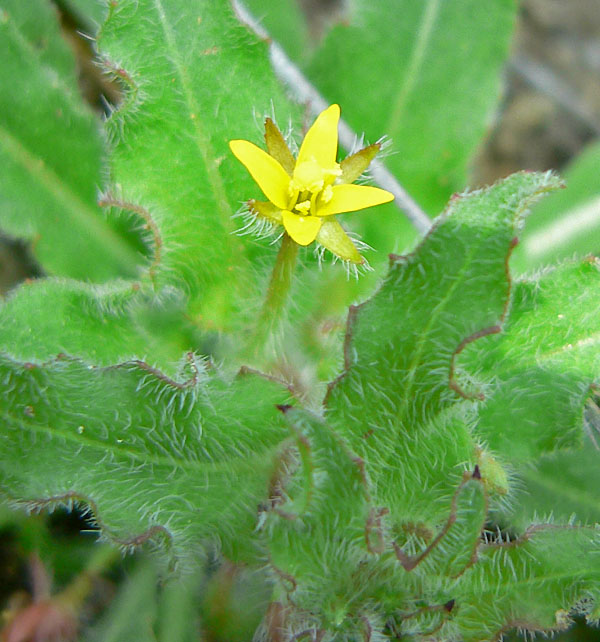
- Camissoniopsis micrantha

Scientific classification
- Kingdom: Plantae
- Clade: Tracheophytes
- Clade: Angiosperms
- Clade: Eudicots
- Clade: Rosids
- Order: Myrtales
- Family: Onagraceae
- Subfamily: Onagroideae
- Tribe: Onagreae
- Genus: Camissoniopsis; W.L.Wagner & Hoch

Species
- See text

= Camissoniopsis =

Genus of flowering plants

Camissoniopsis is a plant genus in the evening primrose family (Onagraceae).

== Species ==
As of February 2015 The Plant List recognises 17 taxa (of species and infraspecific names):

- Camissoniopsis bistorta (Nutt. ex Torr. & A.Gray) W.L.Wagner & Hoch
- Camissoniopsis cheiranthifolia (Hornem. ex Spreng.) W.L.Wagner & Hoch
  - subsp. suffruticosa (S.Watson) W.L.Wagner & Hoch
- Camissoniopsis confusa (P.H.Raven) W.L.Wagner & Hoch
- Camissoniopsis guadalupensis (S.Watson) W.L.Wagner & Hoch
  - subsp. clementina (P.H.Raven) W.L.Wagner & Hoch
- Camissoniopsis hardhamiae (P.H.Raven) W.L.Wagner & Hoch
- Camissoniopsis hirtella (Greene) W.L.Wagner & Hoch
- Camissoniopsis ignota (Jeps.) W.L.Wagner & Hoch
- Camissoniopsis intermedia (P.H.Raven) W.L.Wagner & Hoch
- Camissoniopsis lewisii (P.H.Raven) W.L.Wagner & Hoch
- Camissoniopsis luciae (P.H.Raven) W.L.Wagner & Hoch
- Camissoniopsis micrantha (Hornem. ex Spreng.) W.L.Wagner & Hoch
- Camissoniopsis pallida (Abrams) W.L.Wagner & Hoch
  - subsp. hallii (Davidson) W.L.Wagner & Hoch
- Camissoniopsis proavita (P.H.Raven) W.L.Wagner & Hoch
- Camissoniopsis robusta (P.H.Raven) W.L.Wagner & Hoch
