= Camissoniopsis luciae =

Scientific classification
- Kingdom: Plantae
- Clade: Tracheophytes
- Clade: Angiosperms
- Clade: Eudicots
- Clade: Rosids
- Order: Myrtales
- Family: Onagraceae
- Genus: Camissoniopsis
- Species: C. luciae

Binomial name
- Camissoniopsis luciae (P.H.Raven) W.L.Wagner & Hoch

Synonyms
- Camissonia luciae P.H.Raven

Species of flowering plant

Camissoniopsis luciae is a species of evening primrose known by the common name Santa Lucia suncup. It is endemic to California, where it grows in the mountains of the Central Coast, mainly in chaparral habitat. It is a hairy annual herb producing an erect stem up to half a meter tall from a basal rosette. The hairy leaves have lightly toothed edges and are up to about 5 centimeters long. The nodding inflorescence produces flowers with yellow petals a few millimeters long with red markings near the bases. The fruit is a straight or coiling capsule.
