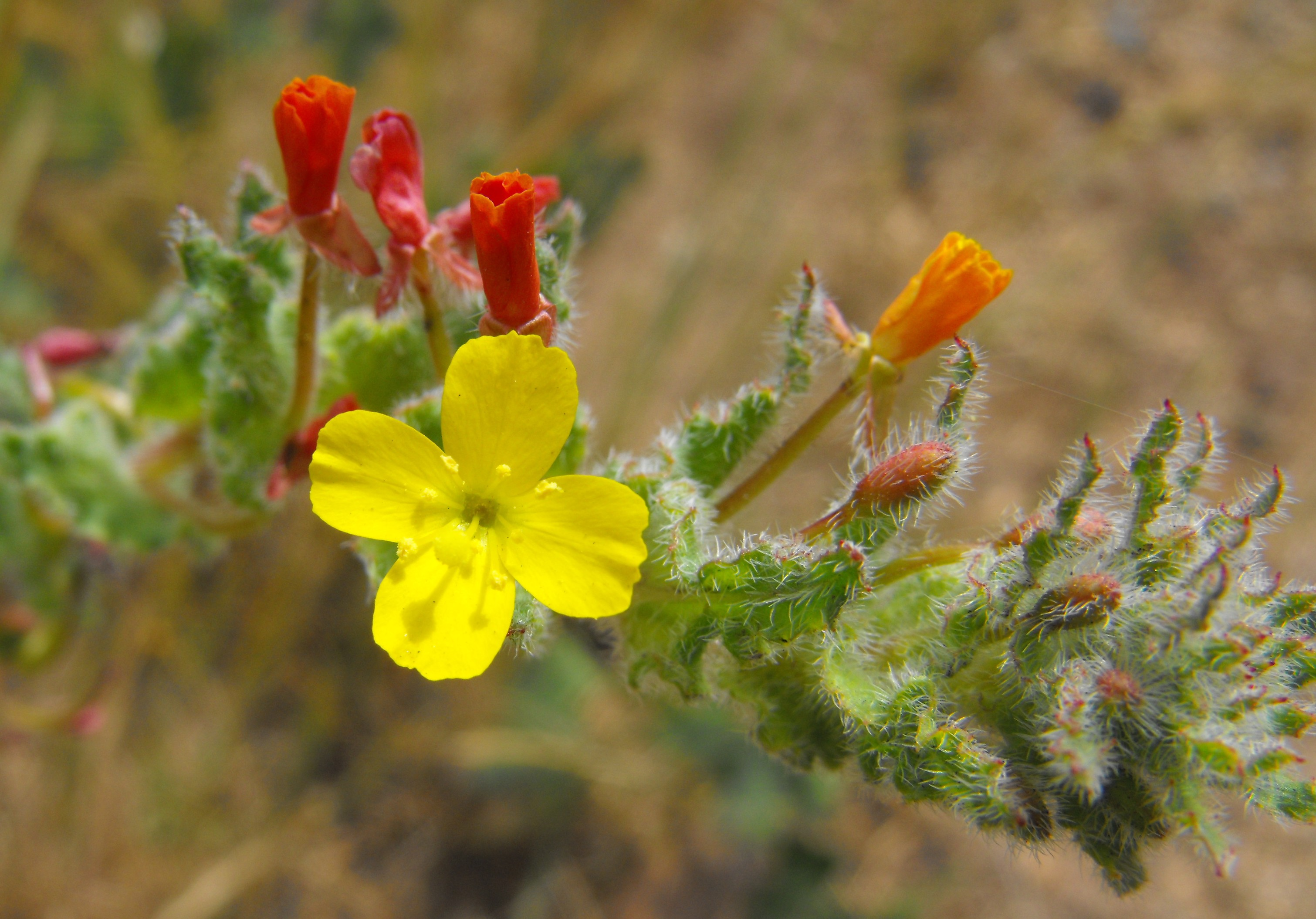

Scientific classification
- Kingdom: Plantae
- Clade: Tracheophytes
- Clade: Angiosperms
- Clade: Eudicots
- Clade: Rosids
- Order: Myrtales
- Family: Onagraceae
- Genus: Camissoniopsis
- Species: C. hirtella

Binomial name
- Camissoniopsis hirtella (Greene) W.L.Wagner & Hoch

Synonyms
- Camissonia hirtella (Greene) P.H.Raven; Oenothera hirtella Greene; Sphaerostigma hirtellum (Greene) Small

= Camissoniopsis hirtella =

Species of evening primrose

Camissoniopsis hirtella is a species of evening primrose known by the common name Santa Cruz Island suncup. It is native to California and Baja California, where it grows on the slopes of coastal and inland hills and mountains, especially in areas that have recently burned. It is an annual herb producing a hairy stem up to about half a meter in height. Most of the leaves are located in a basal rosette at ground level and are oval in shape and a few centimeters in length. The nodding inflorescence produces flowers with sepals coated in long, glandular hairs, and bright yellow petals under a centimeter long each. The petals sometimes have red dots at their bases. The fruit is a coiling capsule up to 2 centimeters long.
