= Real del Castillo Airstrip =

- IATA: none; ICAO: none; LID: RCO

Summary
- Airport type: Public
- Location: Ojos Negros, Baja California
- Elevation AMSL: 2,455 ft / 748 m
- Coordinates: 31°52′51″N 116°11′55″W

Map
- Location of airport in Mexico

Runways
Direction	Length		Surface
Direction	ft	m	Surface
08/26	9,073	2,765	Soil

Statistics (2018)
- Total passengers: N/A
- Source: Dirección General de Aeronáutica Civil

Real del Castillo Airstrip or Ojos Negros Airstrip is a public dirt airstrip located in Ojos Negros, Municipality of Ensenada, Baja California, Mexico, a town located 38 km East of Ensenada, in the middle of Ojos Negros Valley. The airstrip is used solely for general aviation purposes, and it has been used as an alternate airstrip to Ensenada Airport during the time of the Baja 1000 road race. The RCO code is used as an identifier.

== Operations ==
- Northwest Aeronautical Institute (Ensenada, Tijuana) - training flights only
