= Megachile umatillensis =

Conservation status
- Vulnerable (NatureServe)

Scientific classification
- Domain: Eukaryota
- Kingdom: Animalia
- Phylum: Arthropoda
- Class: Insecta
- Order: Hymenoptera
- Family: Megachilidae
- Genus: Megachile
- Species: M. umatillensis

Binomial name
- Megachile umatillensis (Mitchell, 1927)

Species of bee

Megachile umatillensis is a species of bee in the family Megachilidae. It was described by Mitchell in 1927.

== Description ==
Megachile umatillensis is a solitary, robust, non-metallic bee. The basal section of tergum is concave towards the front and is without ridges. The species is black in colour and its dorsal metathorax (metanotum) is almost perpendicular with the rear of its propodeum. The margin at the posterior is roughly straight and it has a broad scutellum. The bee's tubercles and pleura are without carinae (elevated ridges). It has linear notaulices. The front coxae of males are often spinose. The two recurrent veins of the front wings are attached to a submarginal cell. The species has dentate mandibles; these are large in females. It has four visible sternites (ventrites) as well as four sternites that are not visible. Megachile species have three maxillary palps, and male specimens have larger tarsi at the front.

A female Megachile umatillensis takes pollen and nectar to its nest to create a "bee loaf" (saliva, pollen and nectar). Once this bee loaf is substantial, a female will deposit an egg upon this and chew up leaves to form a small, round cavity around the bee loaf and egg. The female will continue doing this until it completely fills its nest with eggs; it will then construct a thick wall around the nest from leaves. When the eggs hatch, the bees will feed on these bee loaves until they reach maturity, and will gnaw at the walls the following spring to leave the nest. Females carry pollen under their abdomina.

As a leaf-cutter bee, females of Megachile umatillensis may cut sections of leaves in oval or circular shapes to line the cells of its nest. Alternatively, they might use dried plant resin to line nest cells, which it carries in its mandible. The species creates its nests in soil, in stems of plants, in twigs, or will tunnel through rotting wood to create nests. It does not produce honey and has a weak sting which it uses in defence. The species pollinates wild plants and crops and is a small or medium-sized bee. The genus name Megachile comes from Greek words mega (large; μεγας) and cheil (lips; χειλ), which refers to mouthparts of species in the genus.
