= Megachile amica =

Conservation status
- Imperiled (NatureServe)

Scientific classification
- Domain: Eukaryota
- Kingdom: Animalia
- Phylum: Arthropoda
- Class: Insecta
- Order: Hymenoptera
- Family: Megachilidae
- Genus: Megachile
- Species: M. amica

Binomial name
- Megachile amica Cresson, 1872

Species of leafcutter bee (Megachile)

Megachile amica is a species of bee in the family Megachilidae. It was described by Ezra Townsend Cresson in 1872.
