= Camissoniopsis intermedia =

Conservation status
- Vulnerable (NatureServe)

Scientific classification
- Kingdom: Plantae
- Clade: Tracheophytes
- Clade: Angiosperms
- Clade: Eudicots
- Clade: Rosids
- Order: Myrtales
- Family: Onagraceae
- Genus: Camissoniopsis
- Species: C. intermedia

Binomial name
- Camissoniopsis intermedia (P.H.Raven) W.L.Wagner & Hoch

Synonyms
- Camissonia intermedia P.H.Raven

Species of evening primrose

Camissoniopsis intermedia is a species of evening primrose known by the common name intermediate suncup. It is native to California and Baja California, where it grows on the slopes of coastal and inland hills and mountains, especially in areas that have recently burned. It is an annual herb producing an erect, hairy stem up to about half a meter in height. Most of the leaves are located in a basal rosette at ground level and are oval to lance-shaped and up to 12 centimeters in length. The hairy, nodding inflorescence produces flowers with yellow petals just a few millimeters in length. The petals have one or two red dots at their bases. The fruit is a straight or coiling, wormlike capsule up to 2.5 centimeters long.
