= Rudolf Raimann (botanist) =

Austrian botanist (1863–1896)

Rudolf Raimann (1863 – 5 December 1896 in Vienna) was an Austrian botanist.

In 1889 he received his doctorate from the University of Vienna, where his influences included botanist Julius Wiesner. He worked as a volunteer in the department of botany at the Imperial Natural History Museum, and for a period of time taught classes in natural history at the Handelsakademie (school of business and commerce) in Vienna. The plant genus Raimannia (J.N. Rose ex N.L. Britton & A. Brown, 1913) of the family Onagraceae commemorates his name.

== Published works ==
He made contributions in regards to the section on Onagraceae in Engler and Prantl's Die Natürlichen Pflanzenfamilien. A few of his other writings include:

- Mittheilungen über Fichtenformen aus der Umgebung von Lunz (1888).
- Über unverholzte Elemente in der innersten Xylemzone der Dicotyledonen (1889).
- Ueber einige Krankheitserscheinungen der Nadelhölzer (1890).
