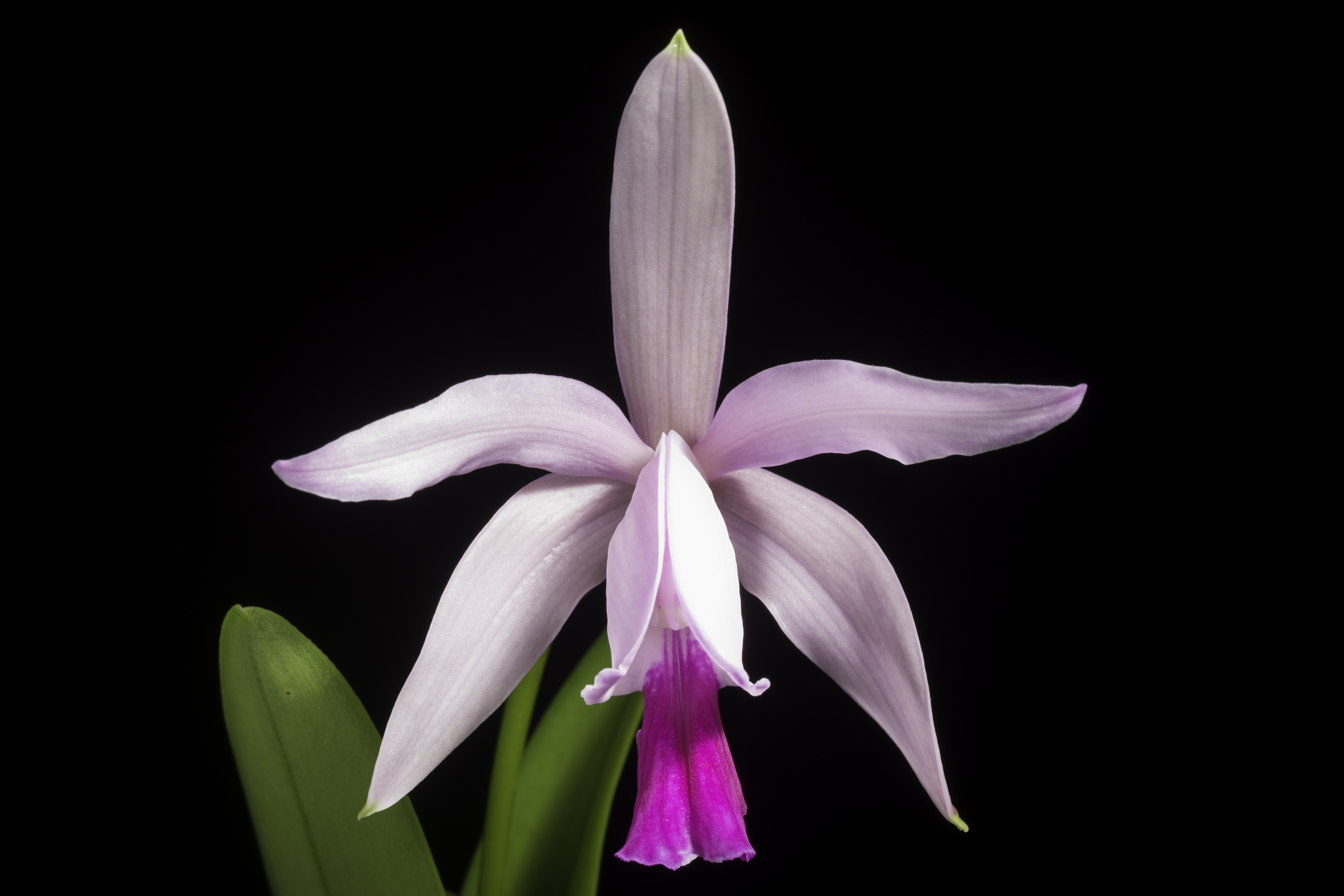

Scientific classification
- Kingdom: Plantae
- Clade: Tracheophytes
- Clade: Angiosperms
- Clade: Monocots
- Order: Asparagales
- Family: Orchidaceae
- Subfamily: Epidendroideae
- Genus: Cattleya
- Subgenus: Cattleya subg. Intermediae
- Species: C. intermedia

Binomial name
- Cattleya intermedia Graham ex Hook.

Synonyms
- Cattleya maritima Lindl.; Cattleya ovata Lindl.; Cattleya amethystina C.Morren; Cattleya loddigesii var. amethystina C. Morren ex Lem.; Cattleya lindleyana Rchb.f.; Cattleya amabilis Lindl. ex Buyss.; Cattleya gibeziae Linden & Rodigas; Cattleya aquinii Barb.Rodr.; Cattleya intermedia var. punctatissima Sander; Cattleya intermedia var. amethystina (C.Morren ex Lem.) Fowlie

= Cattleya intermedia =

Species of orchid

Cattleya intermedia, the intermediate cattleya, is a bifoliate Cattleya species of orchid. The diploid chromosome number of C. intermedia has been determined as 2n = 40.
