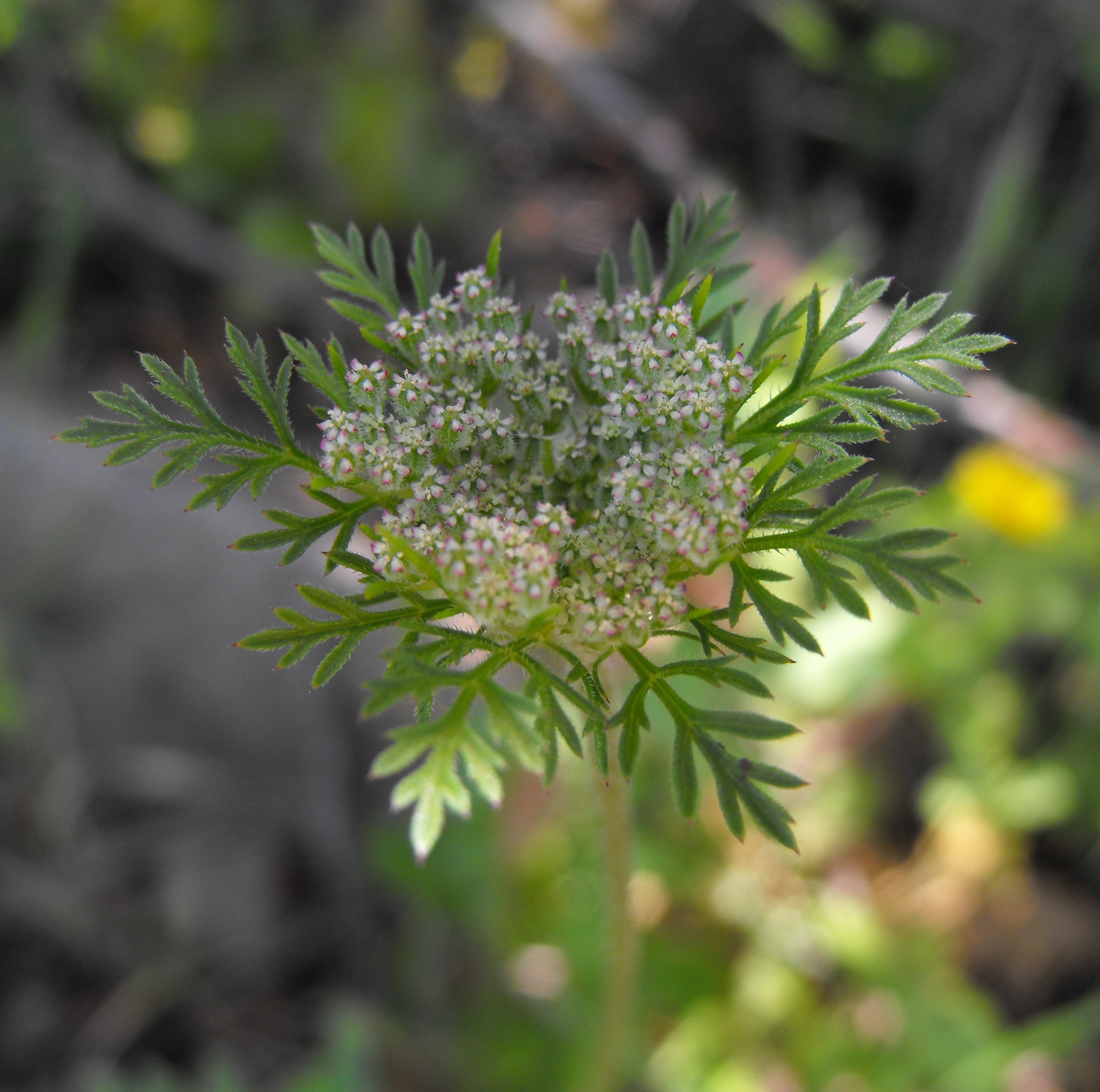

Conservation status
- Least Concern (IUCN 3.1)

- Secure (NatureServe)

Scientific classification
- Kingdom: Plantae
- Clade: Tracheophytes
- Clade: Angiosperms
- Clade: Eudicots
- Clade: Asterids
- Order: Apiales
- Family: Apiaceae
- Genus: Daucus
- Species: D. pusillus

Binomial name
- Daucus pusillus Michx.

Synonyms
- Babiron pusillum Raf.; Daucus brevifolius Raf.; Daucus hispidifolius Clos; Daucus montevidensis Link ex Spreng.; Daucus scaber Larrañaga; Daucus scaber Nutt.; Daucus scadiophylus Raf.

= Daucus pusillus =

Species of flowering plant

Daucus pusillus is a species of wild carrot known by the common names American wild carrot and rattle-snake-weed. Its Latin name means "little carrot", or "tiny carrot". It is similar in appearance to other species and subspecies of wild carrot, with umbels of white or pinkish flowers. The taproots are small, edible carrots. It should not be confused with Conium maculatum, which is highly poisonous.

== Distribution and habitat ==
Daucus pusillus has a amphitropical distribution, and is found in both North and South America. This is a common plant found in North America in the Southern United States and along the west coast from Baja California to British Columbia. In South America, this species is found in southern Brazil, northern and central Argentina, and Chile. It grows in rocky or sandy places.

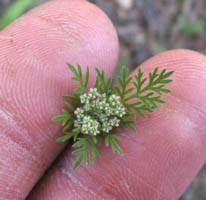
