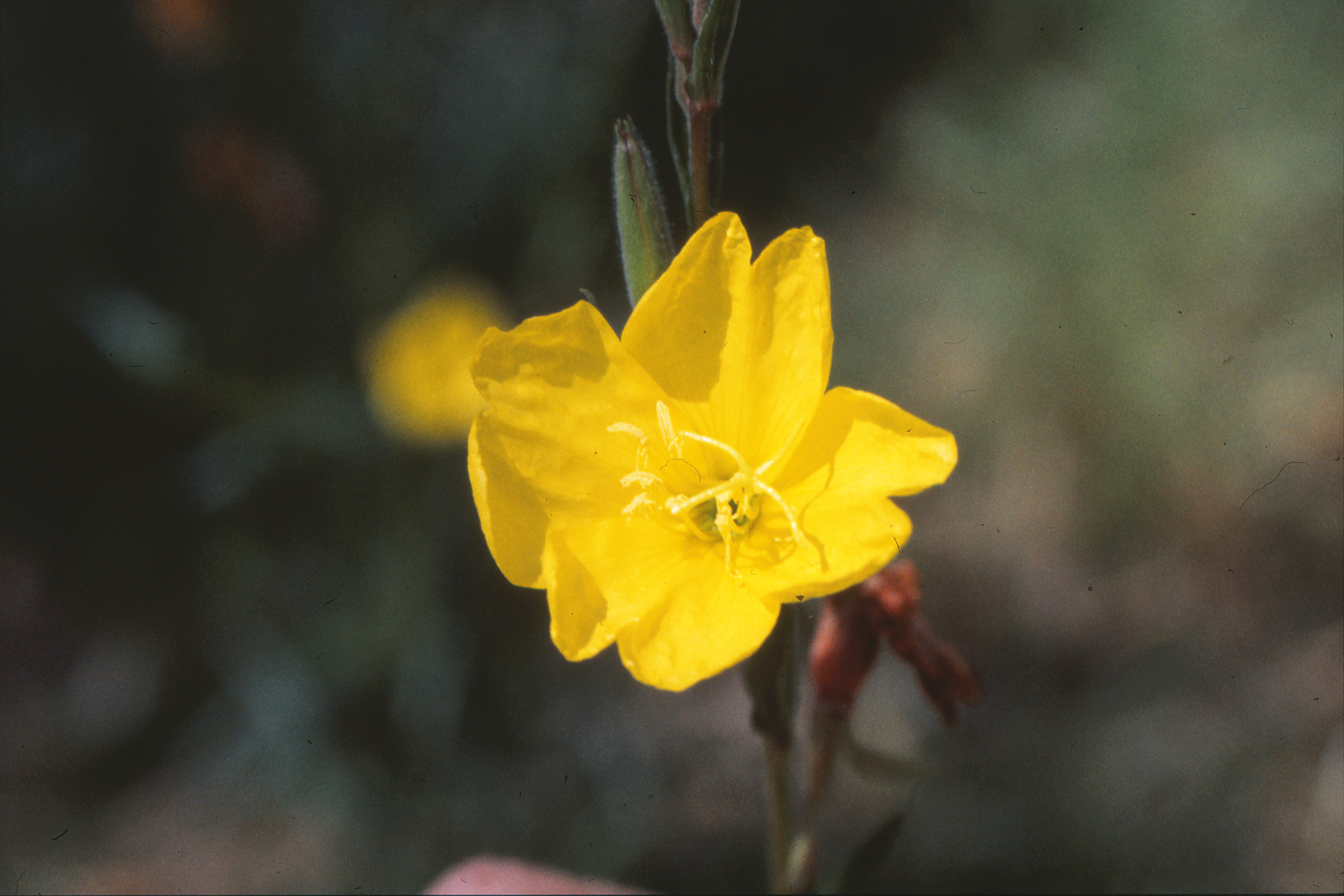
- Close up of flower
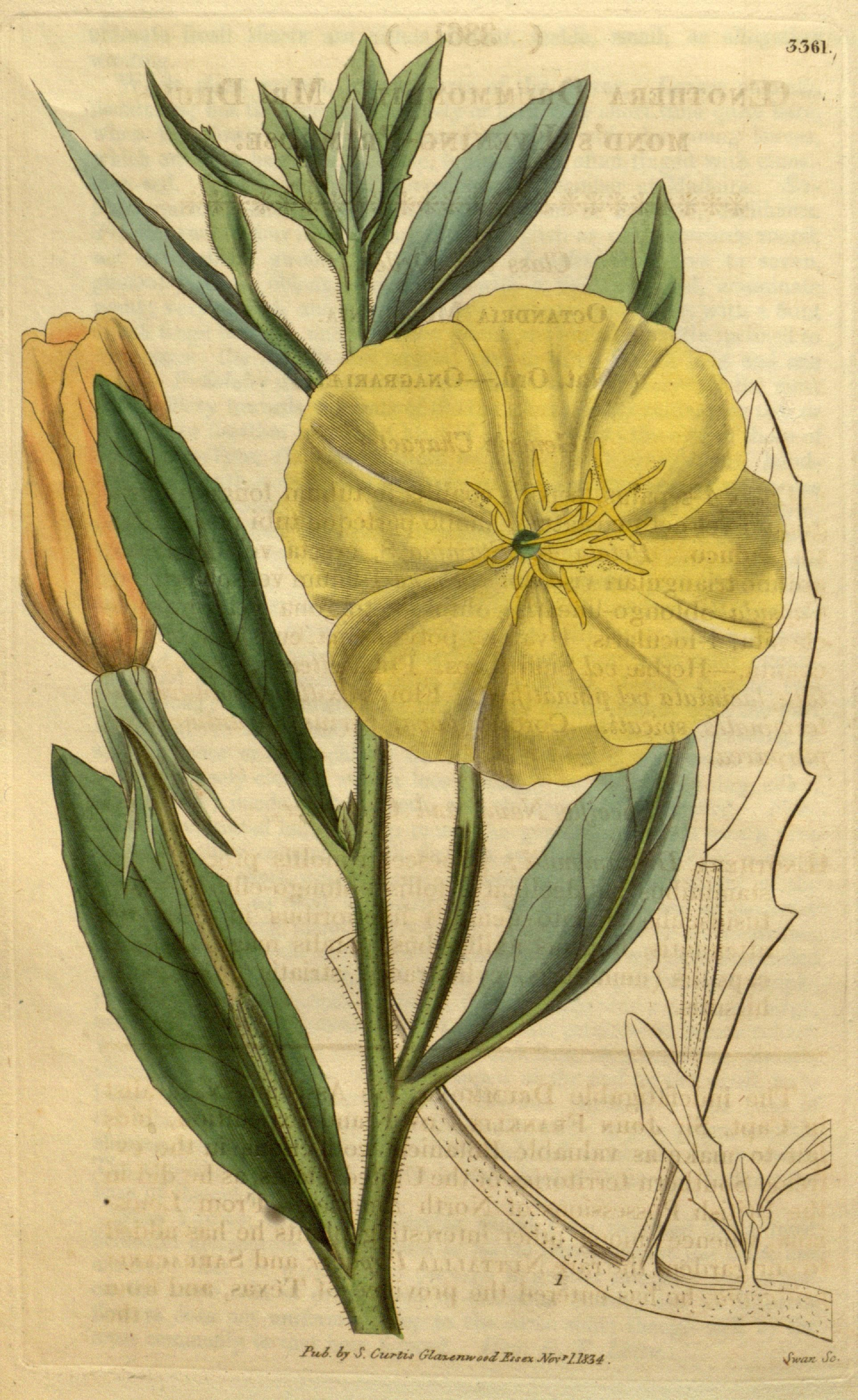
- Botanical illustration

Scientific classification
- Kingdom: Plantae
- Clade: Tracheophytes
- Clade: Angiosperms
- Clade: Eudicots
- Clade: Rosids
- Order: Myrtales
- Family: Onagraceae
- Genus: Oenothera
- Species: O. drummondii

Binomial name
- Oenothera drummondii Hook.

Synonyms
- List: Oenothera drummondii var. helleriana H.Lév.; Oenothera drummondii nana T.Moore; Oenothera drummondii nana-alba Barr & Sugden; Oenothera drummondii nana-albida J.Carter ex J.Dix; Oenothera drummondii var. thalassaphila (Brandegee) Munz; Oenothera littoralis Schltdl.; Oenothera thalassaphila Brandegee; Raimannia littoralis (Schltdl.) Rose ex Sprague & L.Riley

= Oenothera drummondii =

Species of plant

Oenothera drummondii, the beach evening-primrose or Drummond's evening-primrose, is a species of flowering plant in the family Onagraceae. It is native to Mexico and the southeastern United States, and it has been introduced to many locations around the world. It is found on coastal dunes and other disturbed sandy areas at elevations below 400 m (1,300 ft).

== Subtaxa ==
The following subspecies are accepted:

- Oenothera drummondii subsp. drummondii – Texas, Louisiana, Florida, South Carolina, North Carolina, Mexico Northeast, Mexico Gulf, Mexico Southeast, introduced worldwide
- Oenothera drummondii subsp. thalassaphila (Brandegee) W.Dietr. & W.L.Wagner – southern Baja California
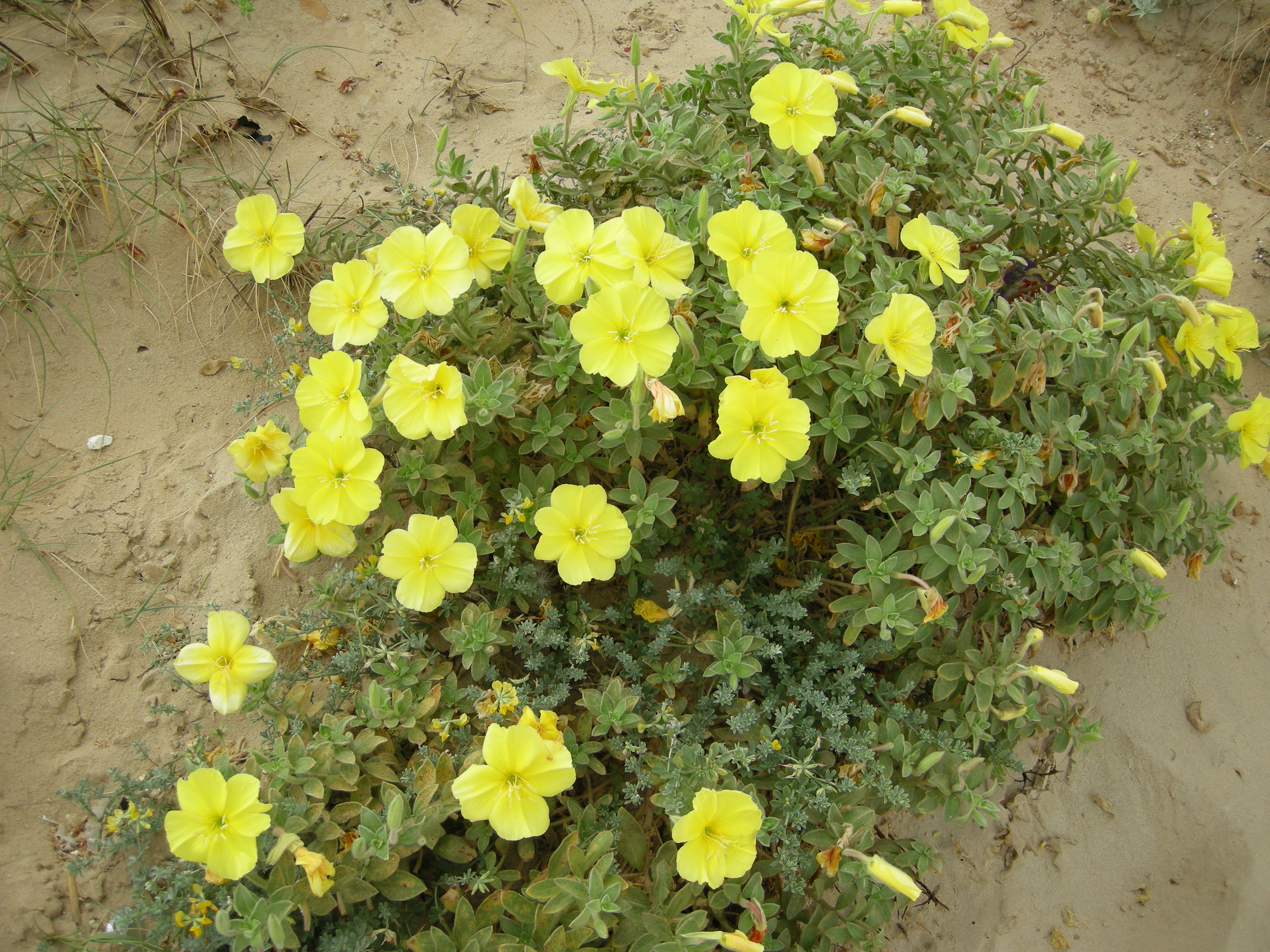
Habit

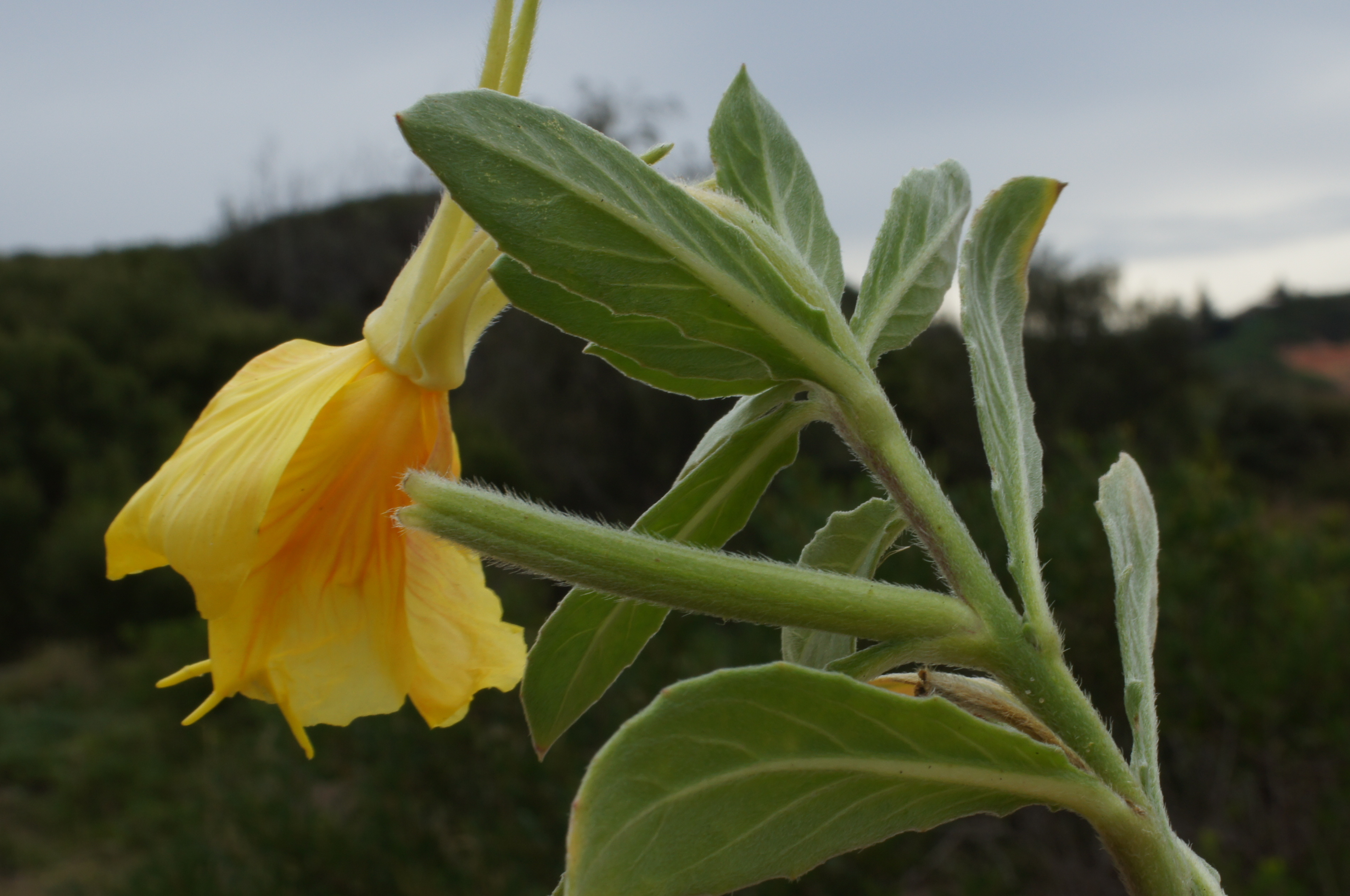
Side view of flower and leaves

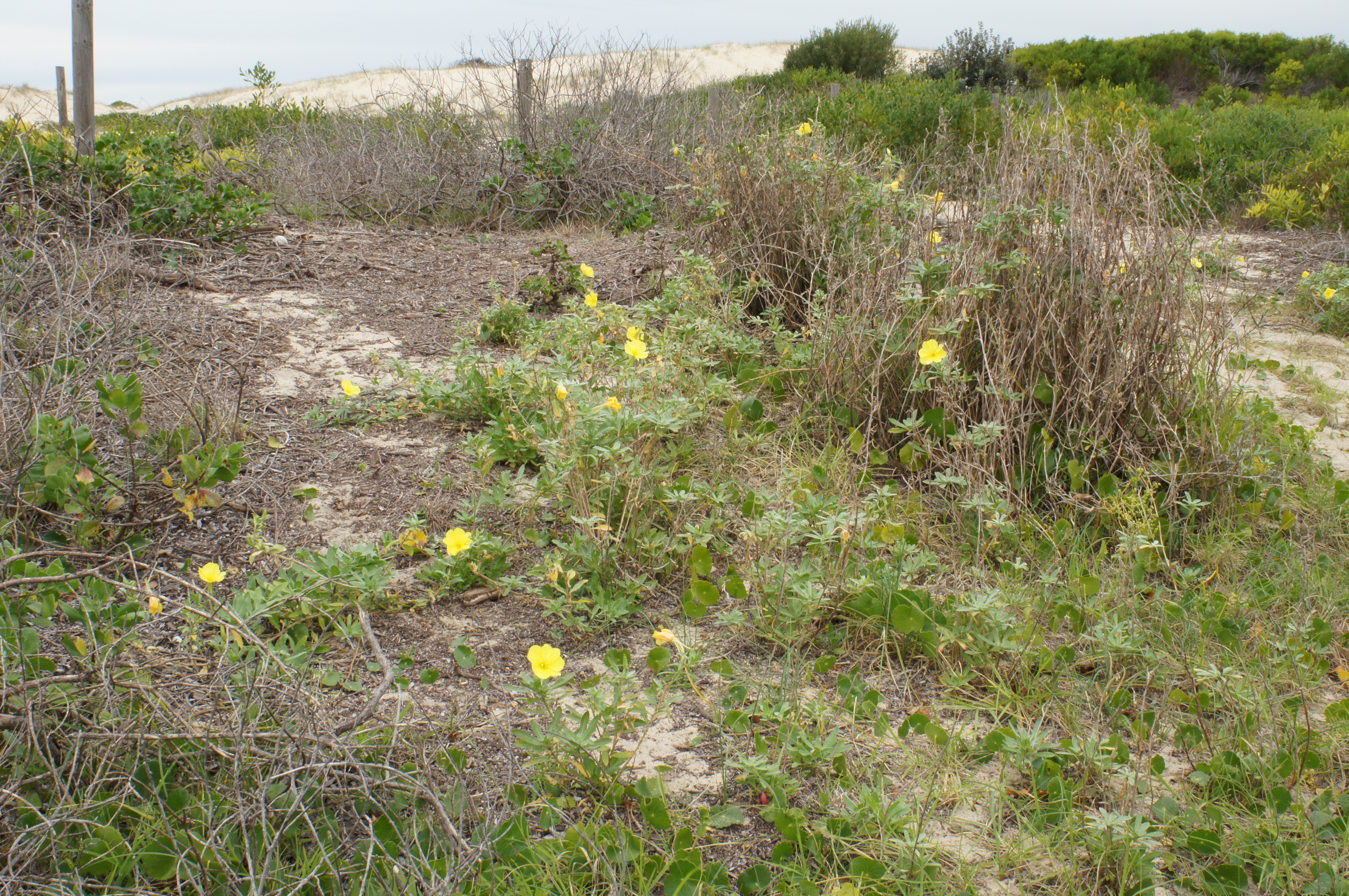
On a beach in Australia

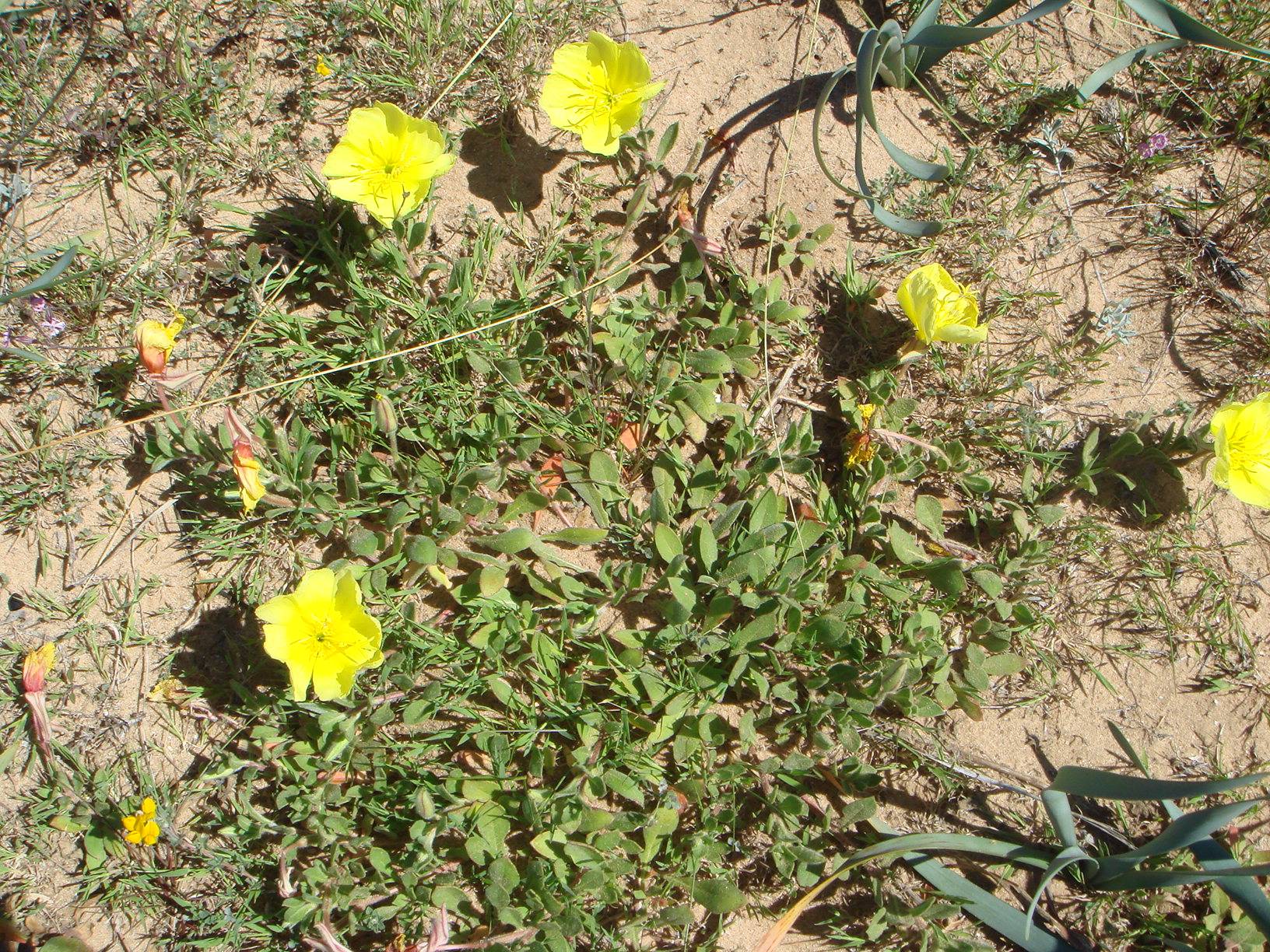
Prostrate on a beach in Spain

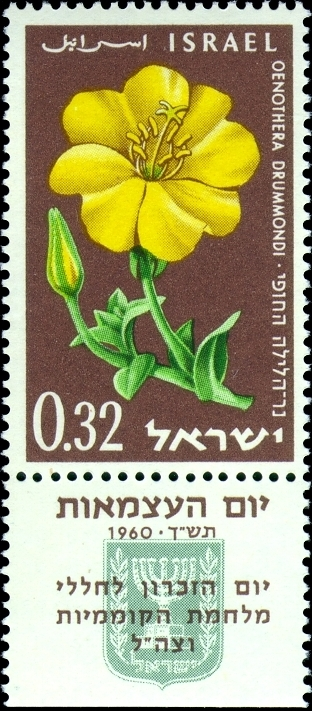
On an Israeli postage stamp
