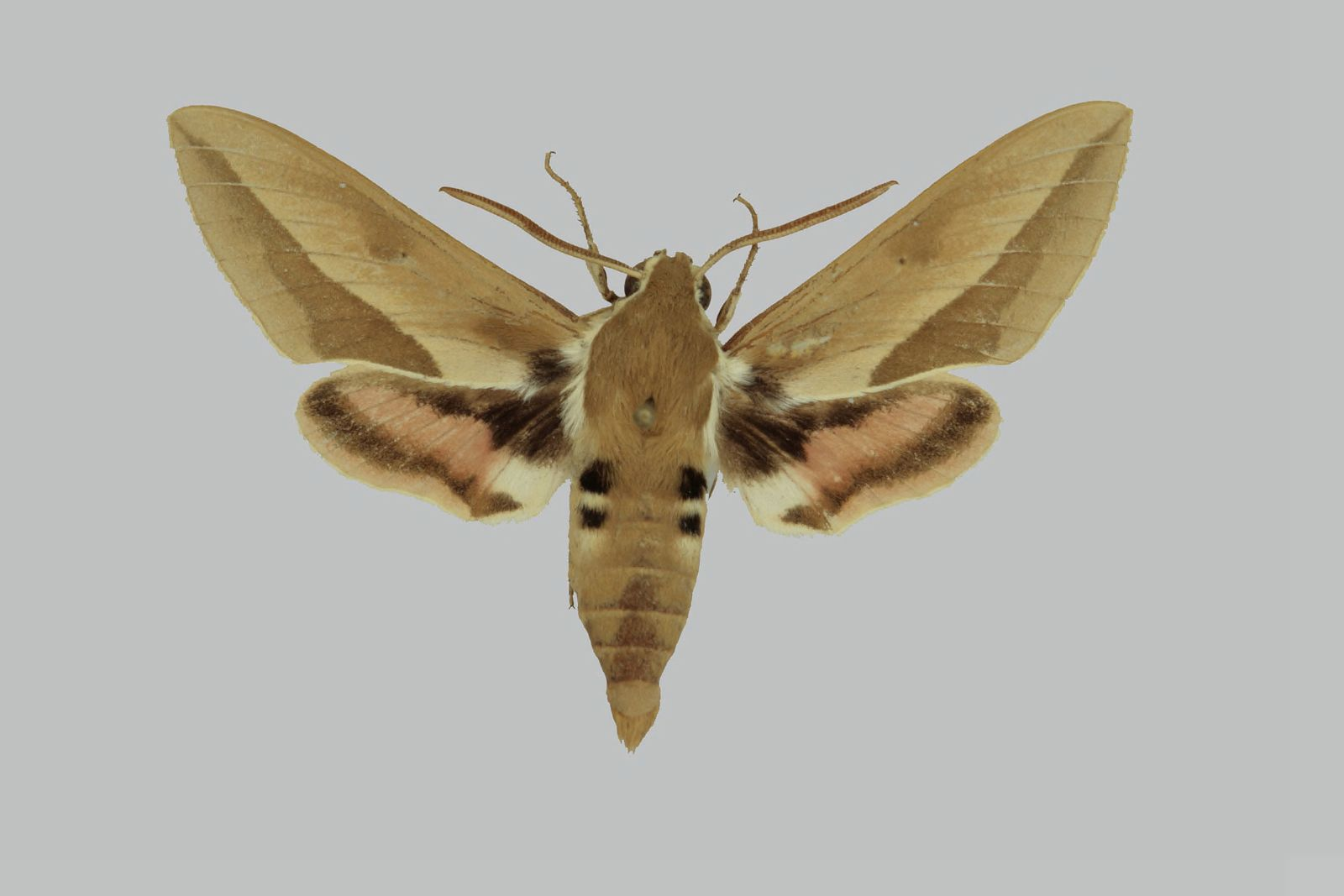
- Male

Scientific classification
- Kingdom: Animalia
- Phylum: Arthropoda
- Class: Insecta
- Order: Lepidoptera
- Family: Sphingidae
- Genus: Hyles
- Species: H. x apocyni

Binomial name
- Hyles x apocyni (Shchetkin, 1956)

Synonyms
- Celerio apocyni Shchetkin, 1956

= Hyles apocyni =

Species of moth

Hyles x apocyni is a moth of the family Sphingidae. It is known from Tajikistan and Turkmenistan.

The larvae feed on Apocynum species. While a close relationship to Hyles chamyla has long been suspected, a combination of DNA sequencing and comparative morphology places this species as a hybrid of Hyles chamyla with Hyles hippophaes bienerti.
