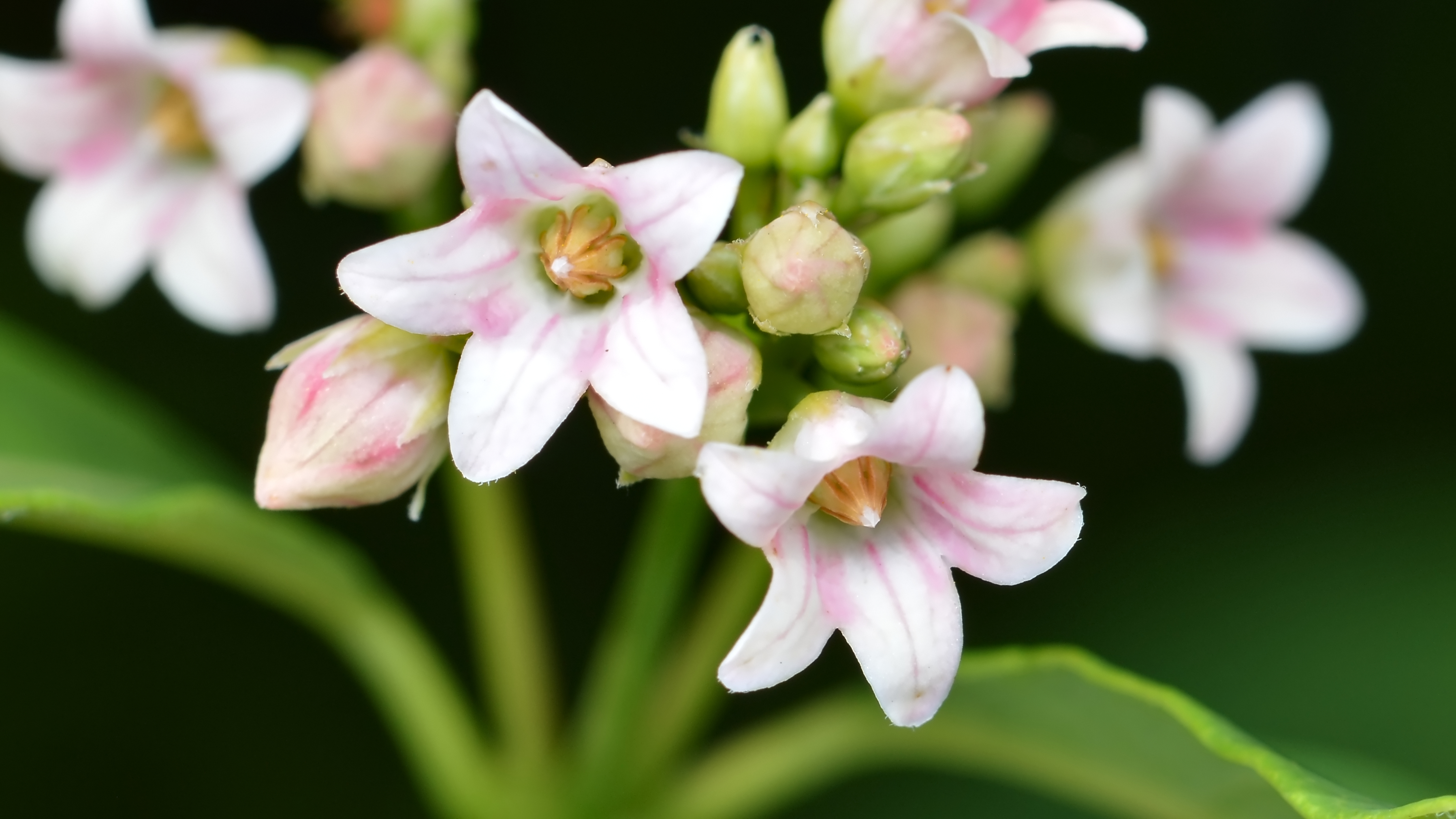

Scientific classification
- Kingdom: Plantae
- Clade: Embryophytes
- Clade: Tracheophytes
- Clade: Spermatophytes
- Clade: Angiosperms
- Clade: Eudicots
- Clade: Asterids
- Order: Gentianales
- Family: Apocynaceae
- Genus: Apocynum
- Species: A. × floribundum

Binomial name
- Apocynum × floribundum Greene 1893

Synonyms
- Apocynum × vestitum Greene 1894; Apocynum × medium Greene 1897; Apocynum × speciosum G.S.Mill. 1900; Apocynum × urceolifer G.S.Mill. 1900; Apocynum × lividum Greene 1901; Apocynum × milleri Britton 1901; Apocynum × andrewsii Greene 1902; Apocynum × divergens Greene 1902; and many more

= Apocynum × floribundum =

Intermediate dogbane

Species of flowering plant

Apocynum × floribundum, the intermediate dogbane, is a member of the family Apocynaceae. It is widespread across Canada, the United States, and northern Mexico.

Intermediate dogbane is believed to be of hybrid origin because its characteristics are intermediate between A. cannabinum (dogbane) and A. androsaemifolium (spreading dogbane).
