= Cymarin =

Chemical compound

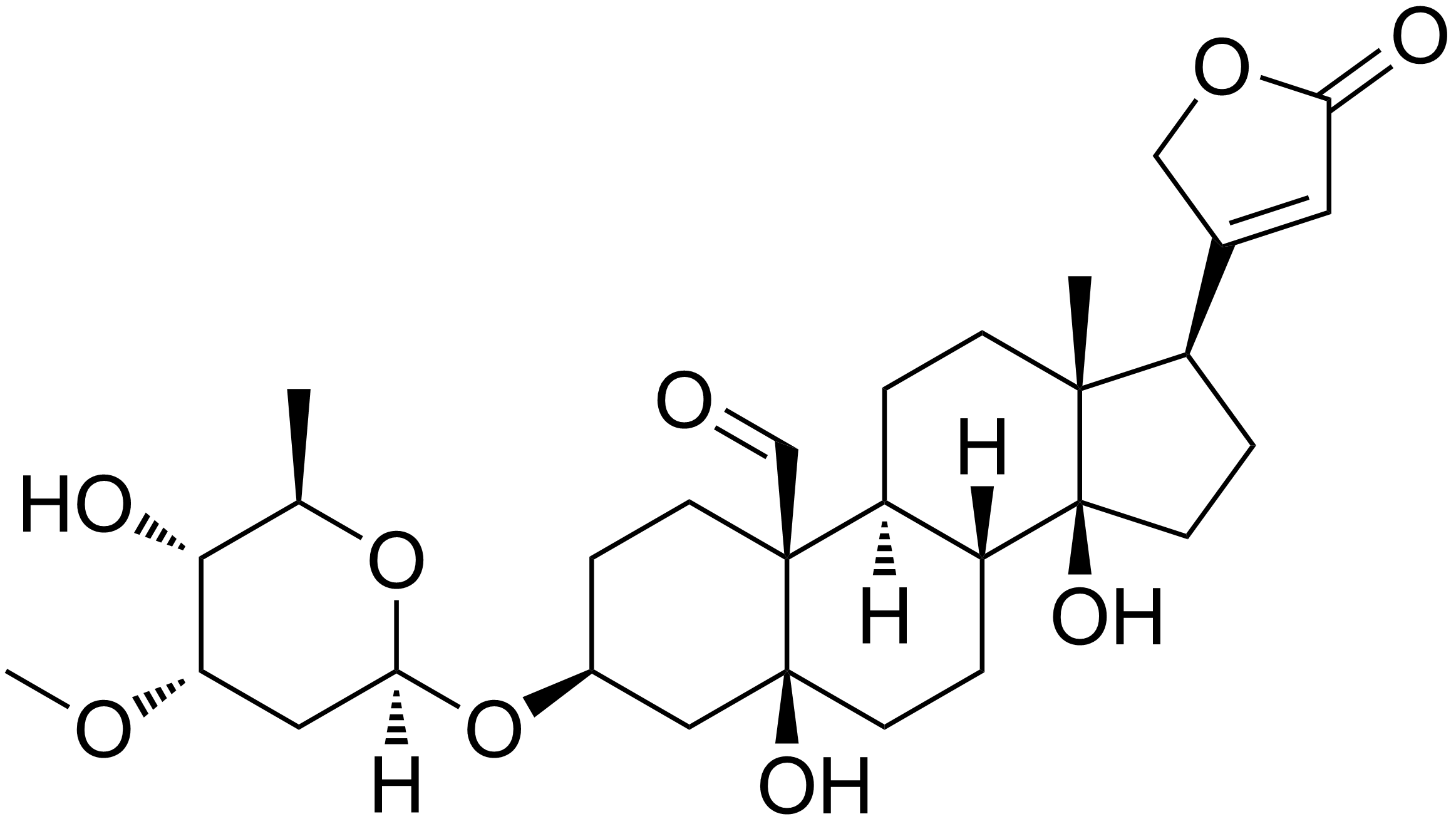

Clinical data
- Other names: Cymarine; K-Strophanthin-α; NSC 7522; Strophantin K; WV 90043a; k-Strophanthin-α
- ATC code: C01AC03 (WHO)

Identifiers
- IUPAC name: (3S,5S,8R,10S,13R,14S,17R)-5,14-dihydroxy-3-((2R,4S,5S,6R)-5-hydroxy-4-methoxy-6-methyltetrahydro-2H-pyran-2-yloxy)-13-methyl-17-(5-oxo-2,5-dihydrofuran-3-yl)hexadecahydro-1H-cyclopenta[a]phenanthrene-10-carbaldehyde
- CAS Number: 508-77-0
- PubChem CID: 441853
- ChemSpider: 390429
- UNII: UK3LS8435E
- ChEMBL: ChEMBL1651908
- CompTox Dashboard (EPA): DTXSID20871714
- ECHA InfoCard: 100.007.353

Chemical and physical data
- Formula: C_{30}H_{44}O_{9}
- Molar mass: 548.673 g·mol^{−1}
- 3D model (JSmol): Interactive image
- Melting point: 148 °C (298 °F)
- SMILES: O=C\1OC/C(=C/1)[C@H]2CC[C@@]6(O)[C@]2(C)CC[C@H]4[C@H]6CC[C@]5(O)C[C@@H](O[C@@H]3O[C@@H]([C@@H](O)[C@@H](OC)C3)C)CC[C@]45C=O
- InChI: InChI=1S/C30H44O9/c1-17-26(33)23(36-3)13-25(38-17)39-19-4-9-28(16-31)21-5-8-27(2)20(18-12-24(32)37-15-18)7-11-30(27,35)22(21)6-10-29(28,34)14-19/h12,16-17,19-23,25-26,33-35H,4-11,13-15H2,1-3H3/t17-,19+,20-,21+,22-,23+,25+,26-,27-,28+,29+,30+/m1/s1; Key:XQCGNURMLWFQJR-ZNDDOCHDSA-N

Cymarin (or cymarine) is a cardiac glycoside. Plants of the genus Apocynum, including Apocynum cannabinum and Apocynum venetum, contain cymarin. Cymarin is a cardiac glycoside and an anti-arrhythmia and cardiotonic agent.
