= Streptomyces apocyni =

Scientific classification
- Domain: Bacteria
- Kingdom: Bacillati
- Phylum: Actinomycetota
- Class: Actinomycetia
- Order: Streptomycetales
- Family: Streptomycetaceae
- Genus: Streptomyces
- Species: S. apocyni

Binomial name
- Streptomyces apocyni Liu et al. 2020

Type strain
- TRM 66233

Species of bacterium

Streptomyces apocyni is a bacterium species from the genus Streptomyces which has been isolated from the plant Apocynum venetum from Xinjiang in China.

== See also ==
- List of Streptomyces species
