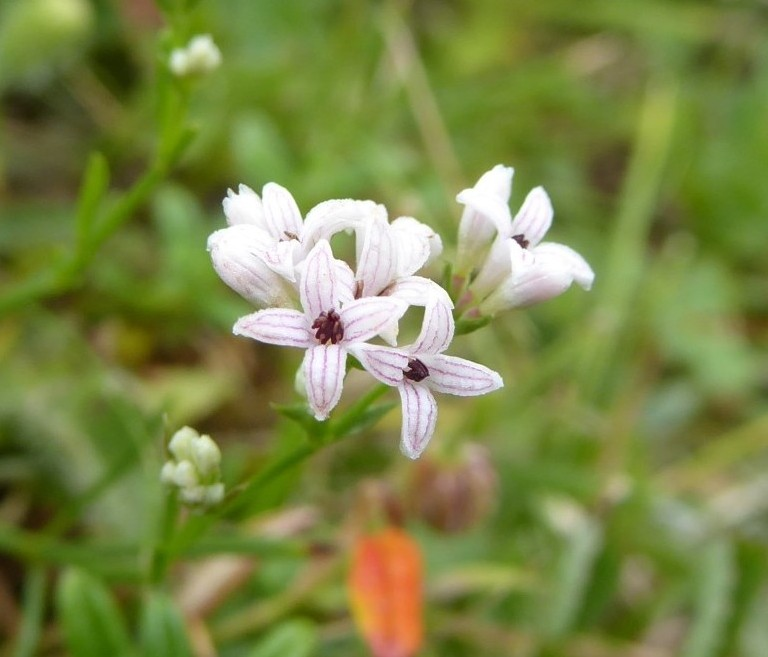

Scientific classification
- Kingdom: Plantae
- Clade: Tracheophytes
- Clade: Angiosperms
- Clade: Eudicots
- Clade: Asterids
- Order: Gentianales
- Family: Rubiaceae
- Genus: Cynanchica
- Species: C. pyrenaica

Binomial name
- Cynanchica pyrenaica (L.) P. Caputo & Del Guacchio

Synonyms
- List: Asperula cynanchica L.; Asperula collina Salisb.; Asperula heteroclada Hausskn.; Asperula kerneri Procupiu ex O. Deg.; Asperula macroclada A. Huet; Asperula minor Gray; Asperula multiflora Lapeyr.; Asperula pyrenaica L.; Asperula rubeola Gratel.; Asperula saxatilis Lam.; Asperula semiamicta Klokov; Asperula subalpina Schur; Asperula tenuiflora Jord.; Asperula tinctoria var. adhaerens Gren.; Asperula tinctoria var. pyrenaica (L.) Rouy; Asperula trabutii Sennen; Galium cynanchicum (L.) Scop.

= Cynanchica pyrenaica =

Squinancywort

Species of plant

Cynanchica pyrenaica (syn. Asperula cynanchica), commonly known as squinancywort, is a species of flowering plant in the family Rubiaceae. It is native to much of southern and central Europe from Spain and Ireland to Russia, where it grows in calcareous and coastal grasslands. Its peculiar common name is an anglicisation of the scientific one.

== Description ==
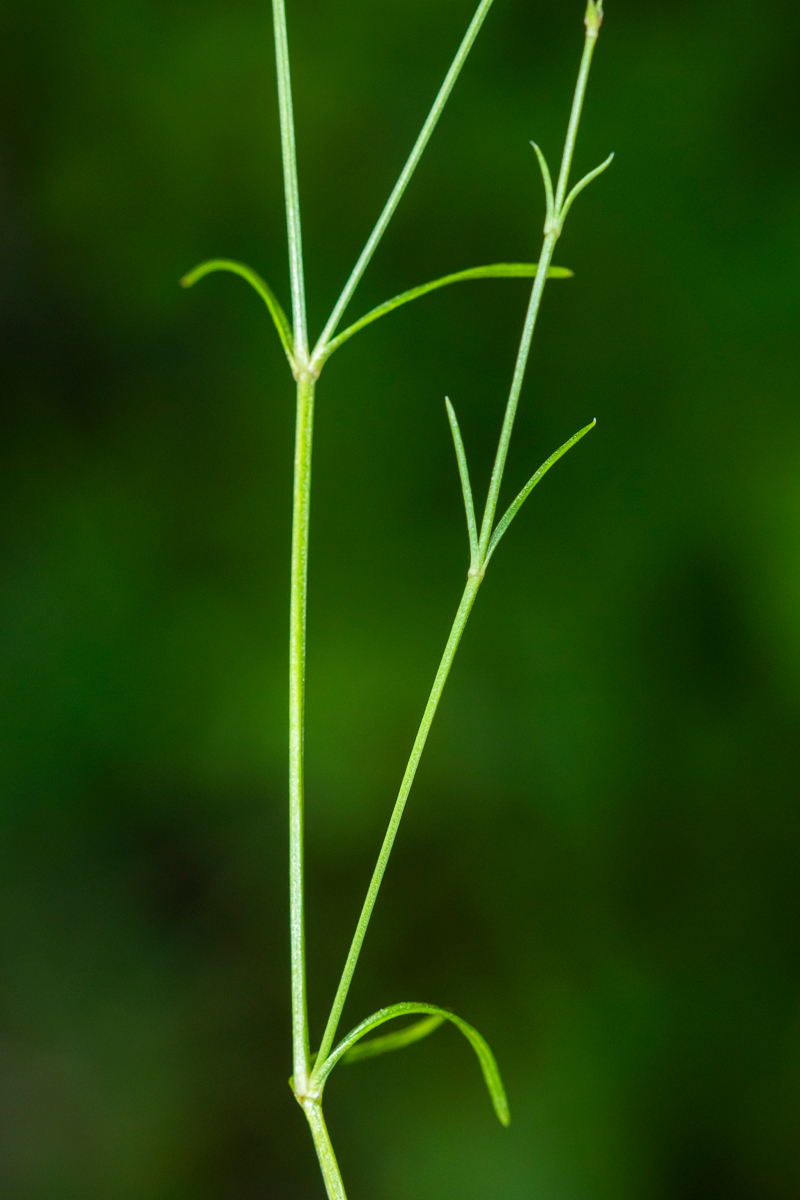
The leaves are in pairs or whorls of four.

Squinancywort is a delicate, prostrate to ascending herbaceous perennial plant with weak stems that sprawl across the ground or scramble amongst other vegetation. Plants are rhizomatous and typically form a loose patch up to 40 cm across (exceptionally up to 1 m), interspersed with other plants and often rather concealed within a grassland. The green, much-branched stems are square in section with winged corners, roughly hairy below and glabrous towards the tips.

The lower leaves are elliptical and the upper ones narrow and linear, entire (i.e. unlobed and untoothed) and tapered towards a pointed tip. They appear to grow in whorls of 4 although, technically, at each node there are 2 leaves about 20 mm long, and 2-4 leaf-like stipules, with the stipules often much shorter than the leaves. They are hairless.

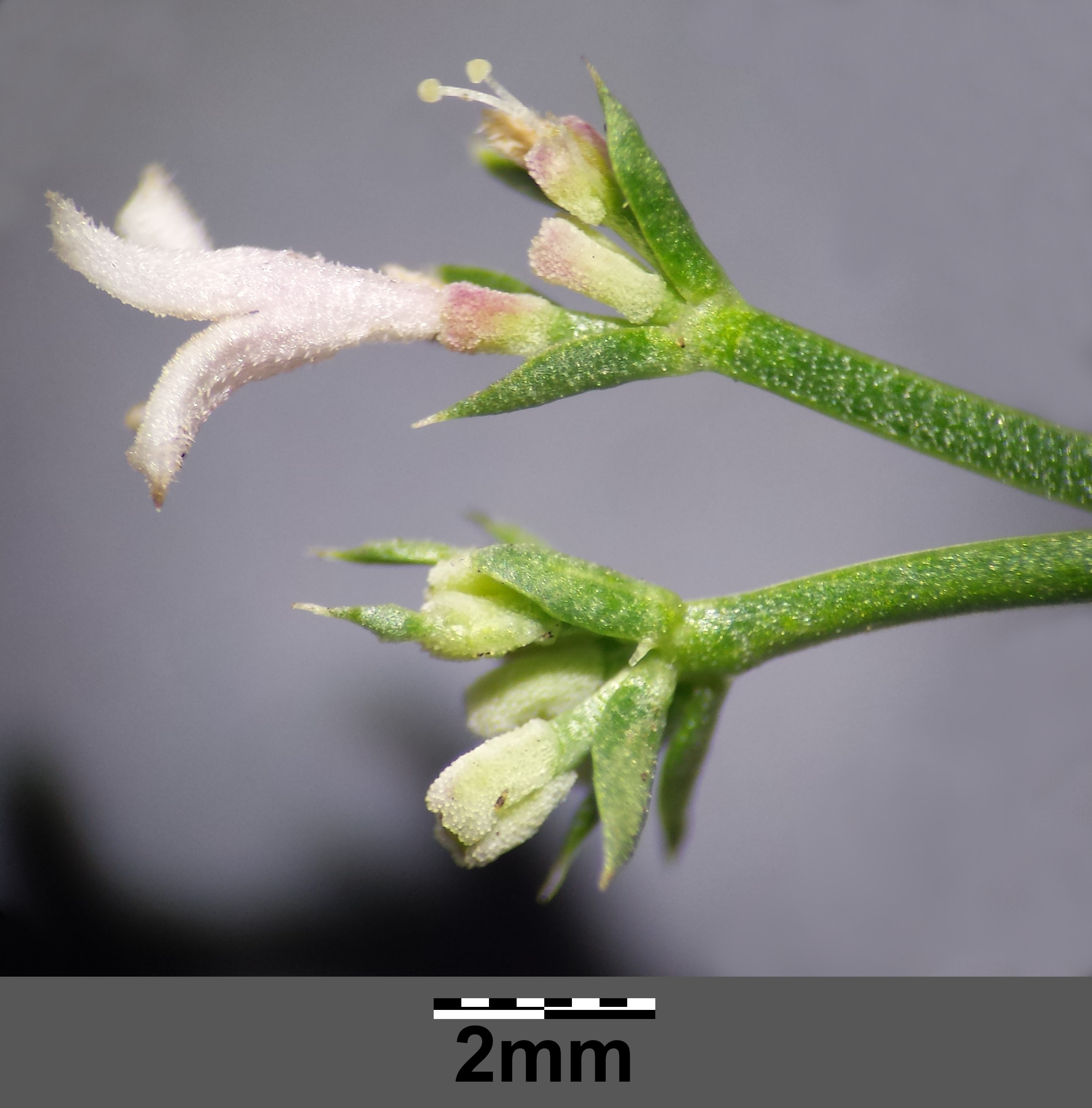
Side view of the flowers

The inflorescences arise in the leaf axils and at the tips of the stems, in few-flowered cymes. The individual flowers are small, 3–4 mm across, and are typically white (pinkish on the backs of the petals) and often with a pattern of darker pink veins on the corolla lobes. Each flower is a tube about 5 mm long with 4-5 lobes at the mouth, and vanilla-scented. The calyx is shorter with 4 shallow lobes. Within each bisexual flower there are 4 stamens and one style, with an inferior ovary. The fruits are warty nutlets.

== Taxonomy ==
The original name (basionym) of this species is Asperula cynanchica, given by Linnaeus in Species Plantarum, 1753, p. 104. He, in turn, took the name from earlier publications such as Adrianus van Royan's Florae Leydensis Prodromus of 1740, where it is Asperula folii linearibus quaternis, summis oppositis (the asperula with linear leaves in fours, opposite at the top) and Bauhin's Pinax theatri botanici of 1623, which calls it Rubia cynanchica. Linnaeus's name for it was retained until 2000, by which time numerous DNA studies had revealed that the genus was polyphyletic. In order to conserve the evolutionary link between the species and their names, the genus Cynanchica was created.

Squinancy and Cynanchica are both ultimately derived from the ancient Greek κυνάγχη (kunánkhē) which means a dog's collar or (by analogy) a painful sore throat. The name Cynanche was used by Dioscorides for a medicinal shrub thought to have been sword-leaf dogbane and then re-used by Bauhin for this plant. The English name squinancywort is simply a corruption of the scientific name, with the suffix "wort" added, meaning a plant.

There are currently four accepted subspecies:

- Cynanchica pyrenaica subsp. cynanchica (L.) P. Caputo & Del Guacchio. This is the common plant, found throughout the range. It is recognised by the corolla tube being up to twice as long as the lobes.
- Cynanchica pyrenaica subsp. neglecta (Guss.) P. Caputo & Del Guacchio, which occurs only in Italy.
- Cynanchica pyrenaica subsp. occidentalis (Rouy) P. Caputo & Del Guacchio, which is found on dunes in south Wales, western Ireland and NW Spain. It has orange (not brown) rhizomes and a corolla tube as long as the lobes.
- Cynanchica pyrenaica subsp. pyrenaica, from which the type is taken. It is restricted to the Pyrenees and mountains of northern Spain.

There are no recorded hybrids of squinancywort.

Its chromosome number is 2n = 40.

== Distribution and status ==
Squinancywort is native to Europe, western Asia and parts of North Africa, wherever there is chalk, limestone or coastal sand. It is not rare or threatened, globally.

It is generally a lowland plant, being found between sea level 305 m in Ireland, but it grows above 2,300 m in the Pyrenees.

In Britain it is considered an indicator of unimproved grassland and is regarded as an axiophyte in any county in which it occurs. It is thought to be threatened by agricultural improvement, and in decline, although it is as widespread as it has ever been.

== Habitat and ecology ==
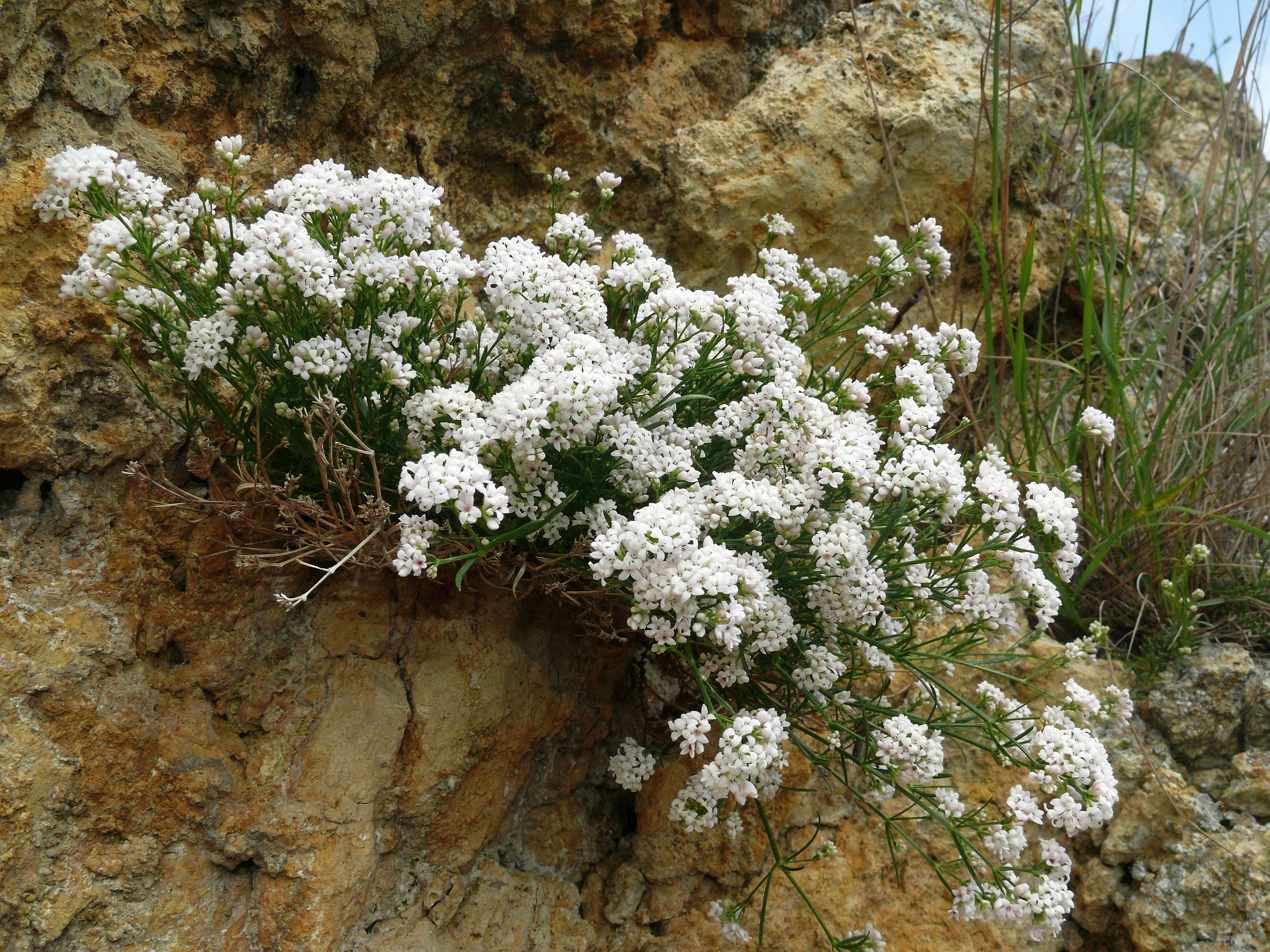
A clump of squinancywort growing on a soft cliff.

Squinancywort grows in short, species-rich grassland established over chalk or limestone, in CG2 Festuca ovina - Avenula pratensis grassland in Britain. It is also found on dunes in south Wales. Under the Universal adaptive strategy theory, it is a strongly stress-tolerant plant, albeit more of a ruderal when on sand (some authorities consider the latter plants a separate taxon, ssp. occidentalis). Its environmental preferences are reflected in its high Ellenberg-type indicator values for light (7) and pH (8), meaning it favours full sunlight and alkalinity, and low values for moisture (3), nutrients (2) and salt (0). A study of plants associated with the hills of yellow meadow ants in Oxfordshire found that, while it can occasionally grow on anthills, there was no statistically significant relationship. The seeds do not have an elaiosome, which suggests that they are not dispersed by ants.

Pests of squinancywort include:

- Cataclysme riguata and Watsonarctia deserta, micromoths whose larvae feed on the leaves
- Timarcha tenebricosa, a beetle which feeds exclusively on bedstraws, including squinancywort
- Several species of fungi, including Puccinia asperulae-cynanchicae, which is a rust specific to this genus
- Aculus minutus, a mite which galls the inflorescence, turning the flowers green and leaf-like
- Schizomyia galiorum, a midge which forms galls of the flowers, where they swell up to form a green or violet ball
- Dodder, a plant which parasitises the stems.

Only the latter three have been recorded in Britain.

== Uses ==
It is not apparent that squinancywort was ever used to cure quinsy. A few modern writers seem to have made this assumption, presumably based on the name, although Mrs Grieve in the 1920s reported that it was "no longer applied in medicine" and Geoffrey Grigson in 1955 simply stated that it was an old remedy. Researchers of folklore offer no support for such a claim, and botanical names do not necessarily carry a meaning. The name was probably used because of a superficial resemblance between the flowers of squinancywort and those of sword-leaved dogbane, the latter being used in Ancient Rome, apparently, to kill dogs and leopards, and dissolve their lips.

Early herbalists such as Culpeper do not attribute it with such properties. He recommended cudweed, hyssop, orpine, ragwort and blackberry as cures for quinsy, but not squinancywort. The name cynanchica appears to have been first applied to this plant by Bauhin in 1623, but he considered it efficacious only against angina, "when taken and applied".

Mrs Grieve reported that in Sweden the roots have been used as a red dyeing agent.
