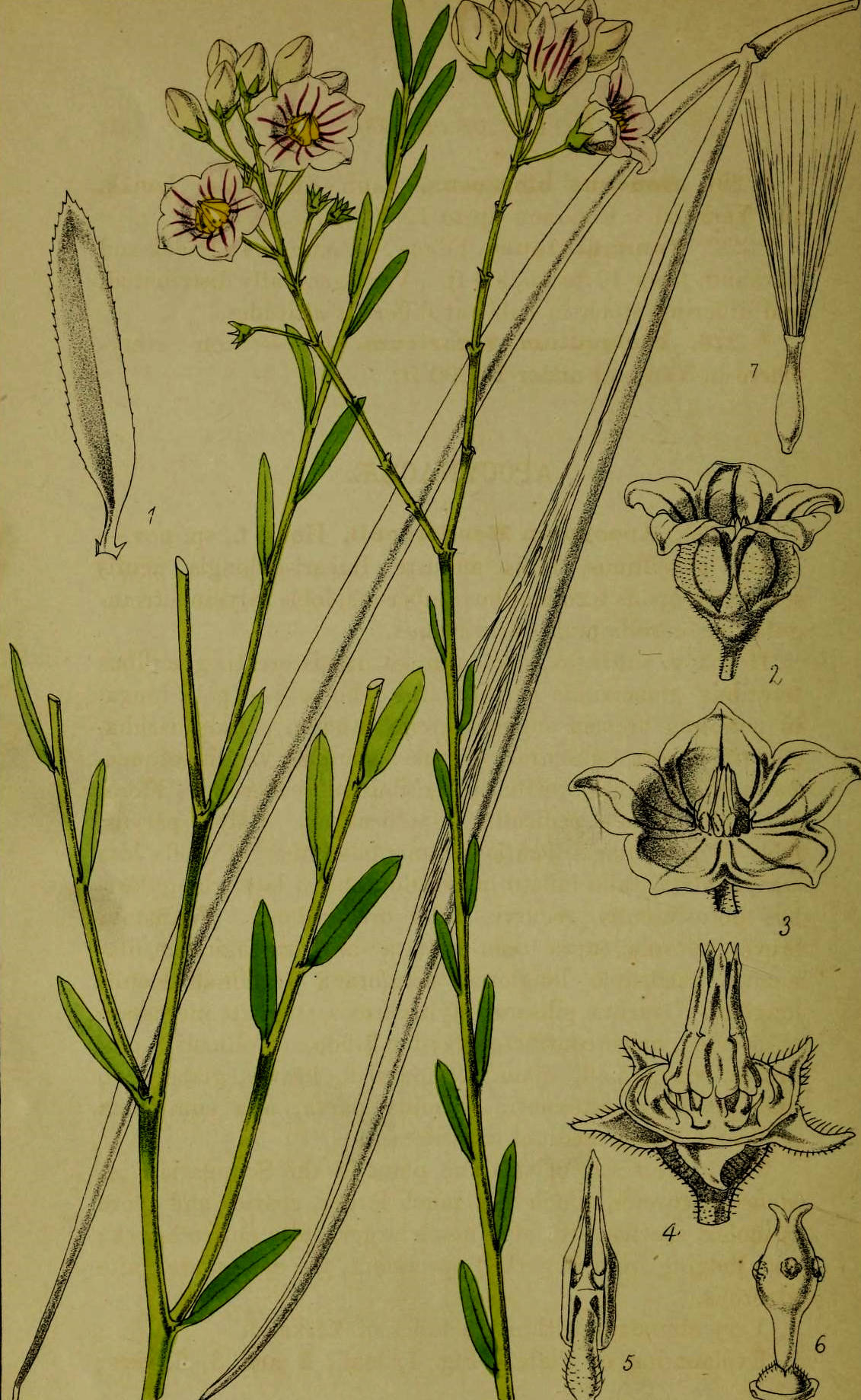
- Scientific illustration of Apocynum pictum (titled with synonym Apocynum hendersonii)

Scientific classification
- Kingdom: Plantae
- Clade: Tracheophytes
- Clade: Angiosperms
- Clade: Eudicots
- Clade: Asterids
- Order: Gentianales
- Family: Apocynaceae
- Genus: Apocynum
- Species: A. pictum

Binomial name
- Apocynum pictum Schrenk

Synonyms
- Poacynum pictum (Schrenk) Baill.; Apocynum grandiflorum Danguy; Apocynum hendersonii Hook.f.; Poacynum hendersonii (Hook.f.) Woodson

= Apocynum pictum =

Species of flowering plant

Apocynum pictum is a species of plant in the Apocynaceae family. It is native to China, Kazakhstan, Kyrgyzstan, Mongolia, and Tajikistan. Alexander von Schrenk, the naturalist who first formally described the species, named it after colored (pictus in Latin) flowers.

== Description ==
It is a perennial herbaceous plant reaching 2 meters in height. Its young, light green branches are covered in soft hairs but become hairless with age. The oblong, egg-shaped, alternating leaves are 1.5–6 by 0.2–2.3 centimeters. The leaves are slightly rough. The tips of the leaves come to gradual tip, and the bases are wedge-shaped. The leaves' margins have dense, minute rounded teeth. Its petioles are 2–5 cm long. Its inflorescences occur at the ends of stems and branches. Each inflorescence has numerous flowers. Each flower is on a pedicel that is 4–5 millimeters long. The arched, recurved pedicels are densely covered in short, white hairs. The pedicels have lance-shaped bracts that are 2–3 millimeters long. Its flowers have oval to triangular sepals that are 1.5–4 millimeters long. Its petals form a basin-shaped tube that is 2.5–7 millimeters long with pink to purplish-red lobes that have distinct darker patterning. The lobes of the flower are triangular and come to a long, gradual point. Its narrow, pendulous, hairless fruit are 10–30 by 3–4 millimeters. The oval, brown seeds are 4–5 by 0.5–1 millimeters that are tufted with 1.5–2.5 centimeters long yellow hairs.

=== Reproductive biology ===
The pollen of Apocynum pictum is shed as permanent tetrads.

=== Distribution and habitat ===
It has been observed growing in sandy, silty soils along streams and rivers and at desert margins.

== Uses ==
It has been recorded as being used in central Asia as a textile fiber, and in Traditional Chinese Medicine as a tea for hypertension and hyperlipidemia.
