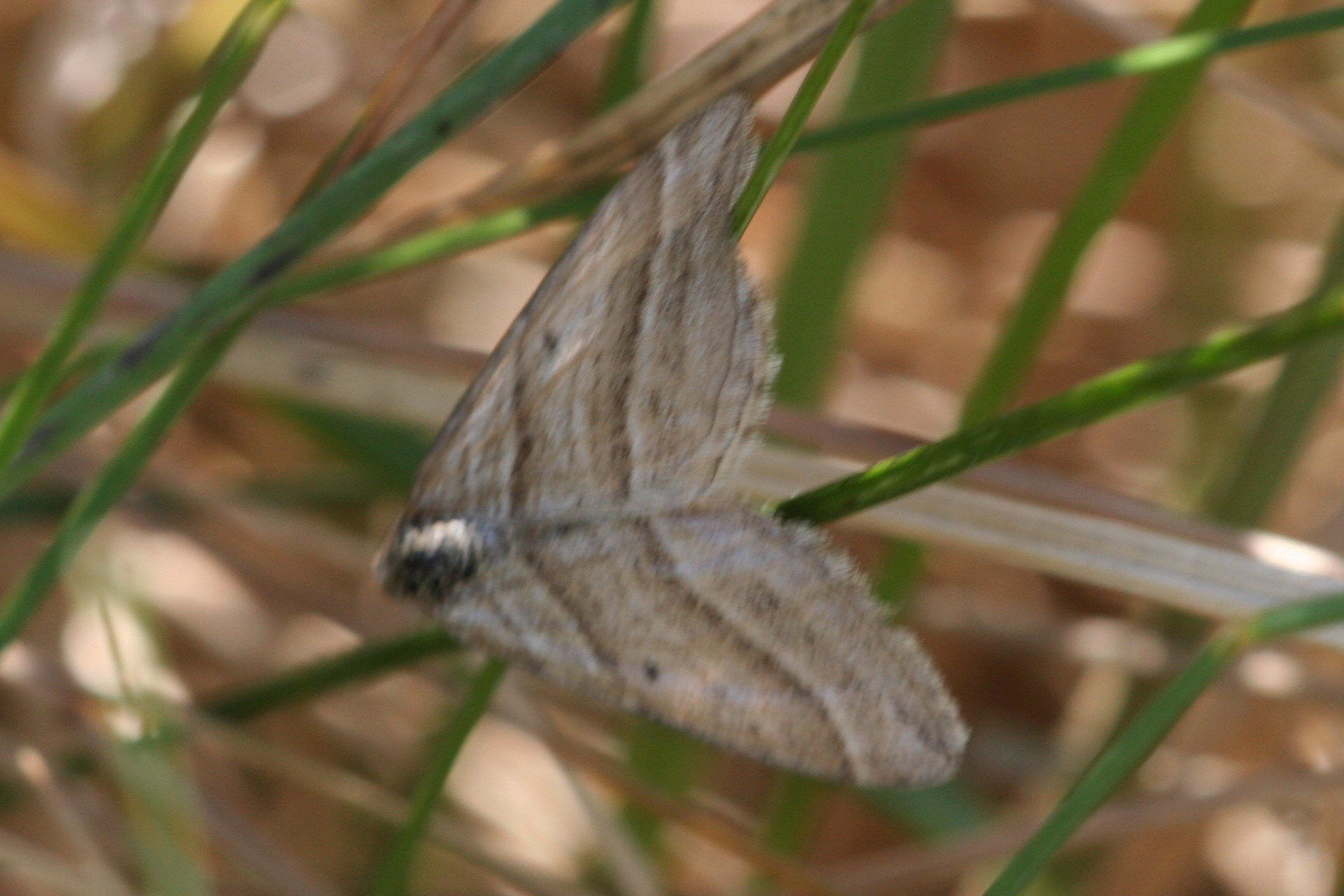

Scientific classification
- Kingdom: Animalia
- Phylum: Arthropoda
- Class: Insecta
- Order: Lepidoptera
- Family: Geometridae
- Tribe: Cataclysmiini
- Genus: Phibalapteryx
- Species: P. virgata

Binomial name
- Phibalapteryx virgata (Hufnagel, 1767)

= Phibalapteryx virgata =

Species of moth

Phibalapteryx virgata, the oblique striped, is a moth of the family Geometridae. The species was first described by Johann Siegfried Hufnagel in 1767 and it is found throughout Europe.

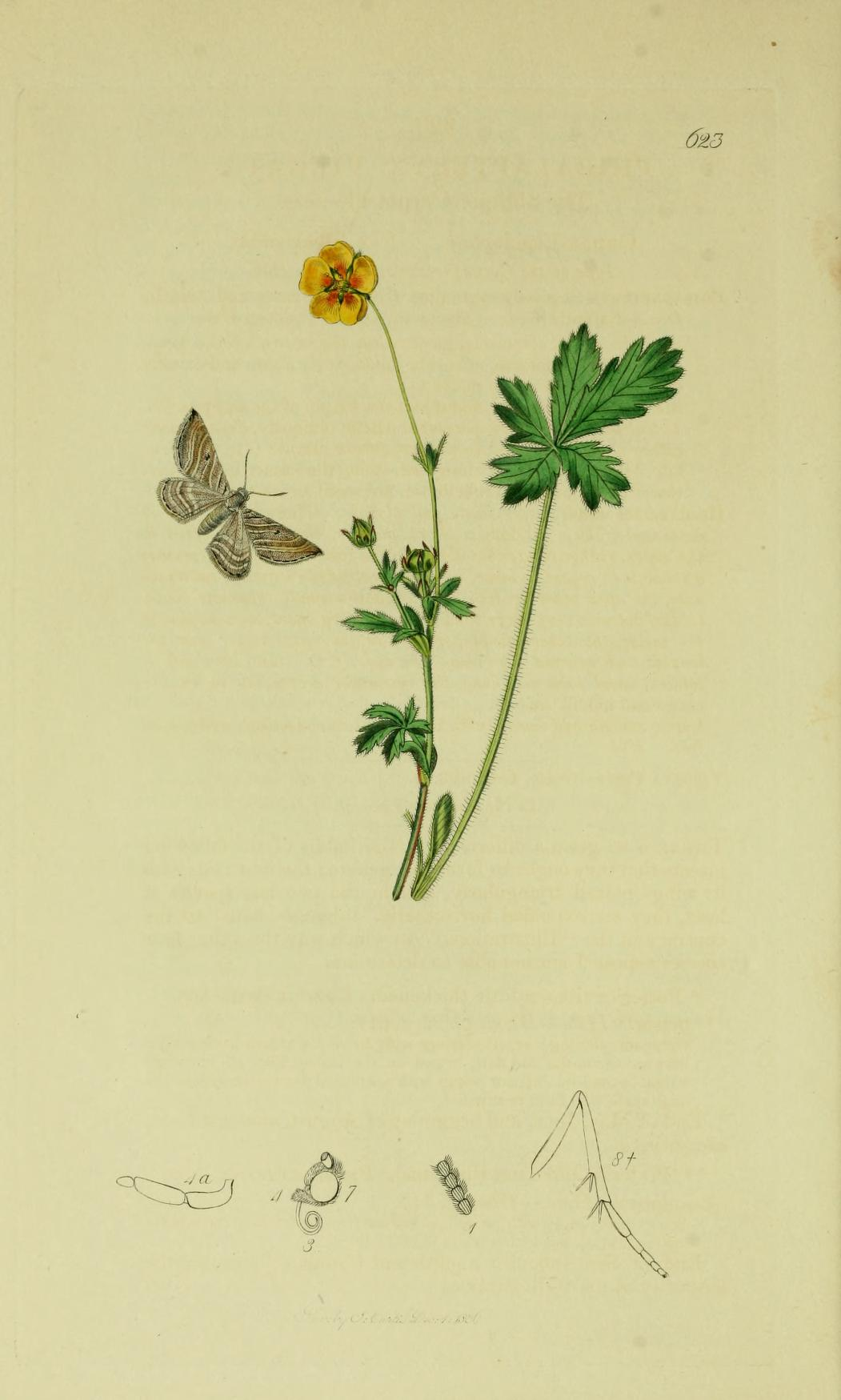
Illustration from John Curtis's British Entomology Volume 6

The length of the forewings is 22–25 mm. The moth resembles Orthonama vittata, but has a lighter colour. The moth flies in two or three generations from April to September.

The larva mainly feeds on lady's bedstraw.

== Notes ==
1. The flight season refers to Belgium and the Netherlands. This may vary in other parts of the range.
