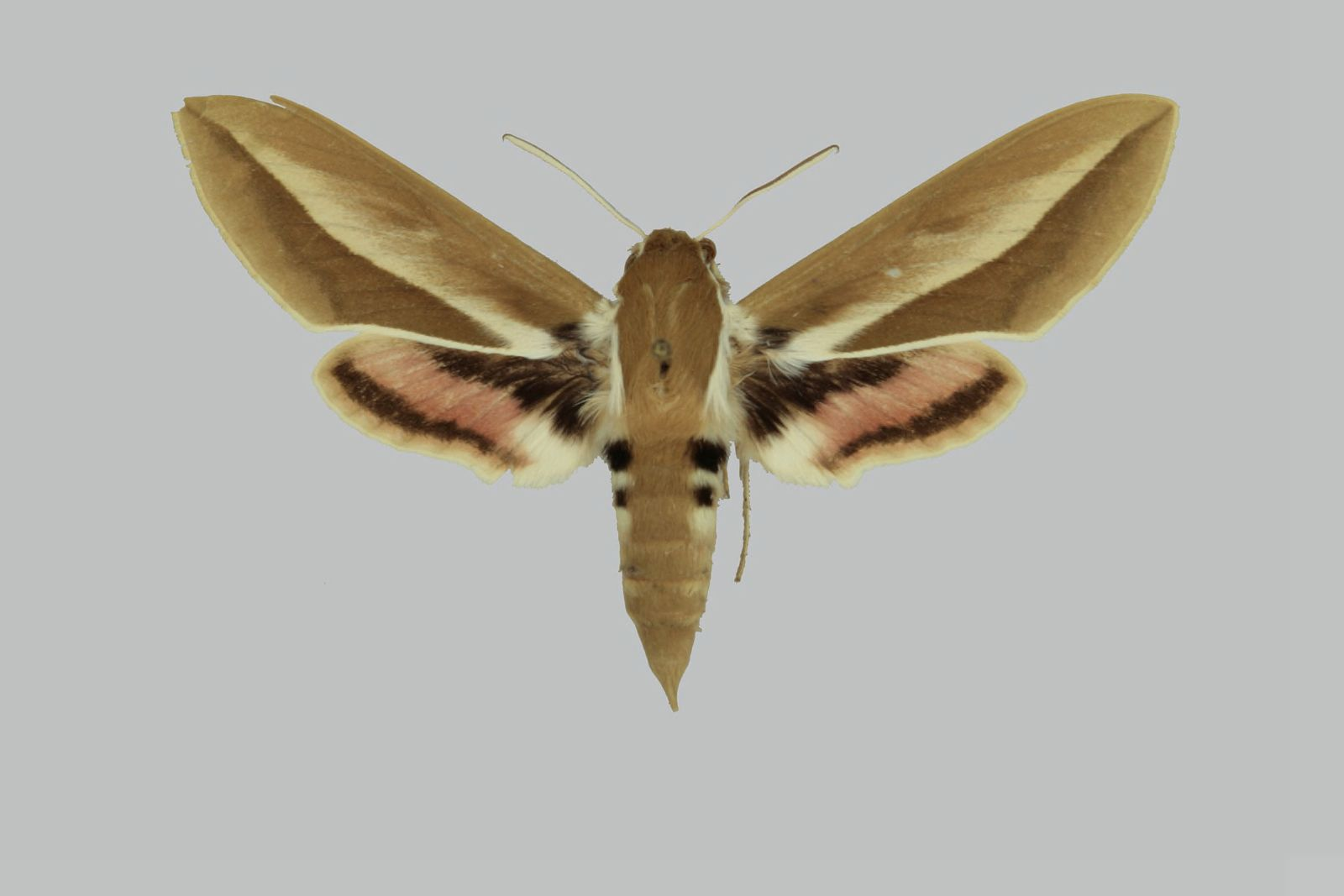
- Female

Scientific classification
- Kingdom: Animalia
- Phylum: Arthropoda
- Class: Insecta
- Order: Lepidoptera
- Family: Sphingidae
- Genus: Hyles
- Species: H. chamyla

Binomial name
- Hyles chamyla (Denso, 1913)

Synonyms
- Celerio chamyla Denso, 1913

= Hyles chamyla =

Species of moth

Hyles chamyla, the dogbane hawkmoth, is a moth of the family Sphingidae. It is only known from Xinjiang in China.

The wingspan is 52–75 mm. It is a variable species. The pink area of the hindwing can be intense or faint.

The larvae possibly feed on Apocynum species.
