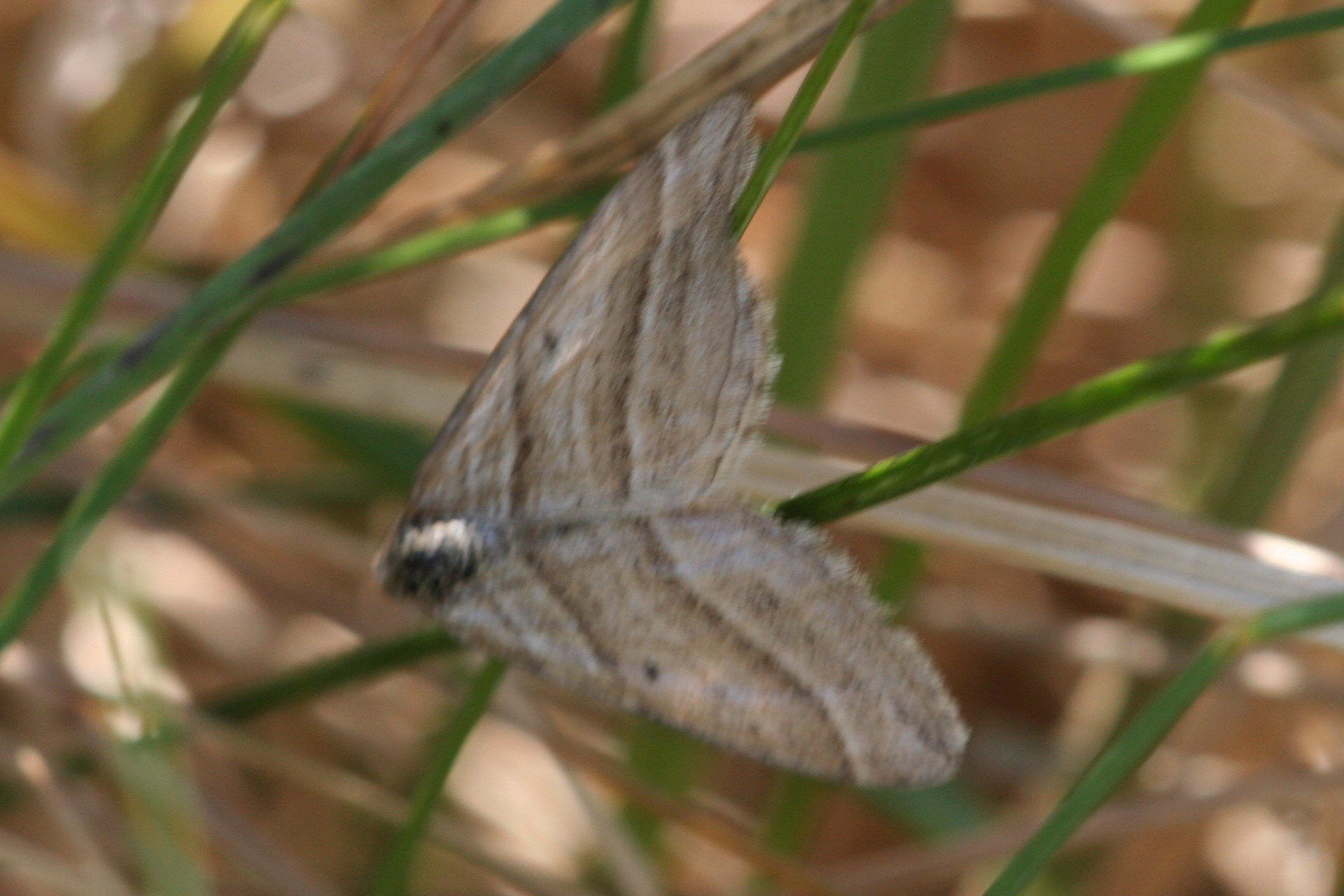
- Phibalapteryx virgata

Scientific classification
- Kingdom: Animalia
- Phylum: Arthropoda
- Clade: Pancrustacea
- Class: Insecta
- Order: Lepidoptera
- Family: Geometridae
- Tribe: Cataclysmiini
- Genus: Phibalapteryx; Stephens, 1829

= Phibalapteryx =

Genus of butterflies

Phibalapteryx is a genus of butterflies belonging to the family Geometridae.

Species:

- Phibalapteryx virgata (Hufnagel, 1767)
