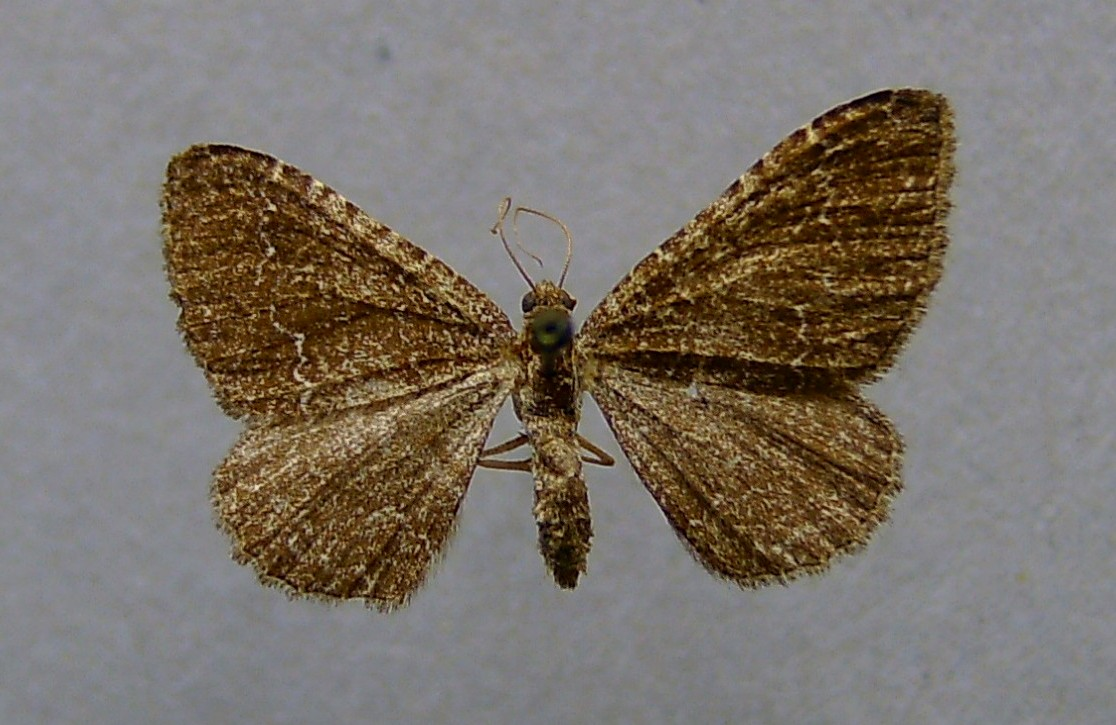

Scientific classification
- Kingdom: Animalia
- Phylum: Arthropoda
- Class: Insecta
- Order: Lepidoptera
- Family: Geometridae
- Genus: Cataclysme
- Species: C. riguata

Binomial name
- Cataclysme riguata (Hübner, 1813)

Synonyms
- Geometra riguata Hubner, 1813; Cataclysme elbursica Wagner, 1937; Cidaria festivata Staudinger, 1892

= Cataclysme riguata =

Species of moth

Cataclysme riguata is a moth of the family Geometridae. It is found from the Iberian Peninsula through western and central Europe to the mountains of Central Asia.

The wingspan is about 20–23 mm. Adults are on wing from the end of April to the beginning of June and again from July to August, producing two generations per year.

The larvae feed on Asperula cynanchica, Bellis perennis and Galium. The species overwinters as a pupa.
