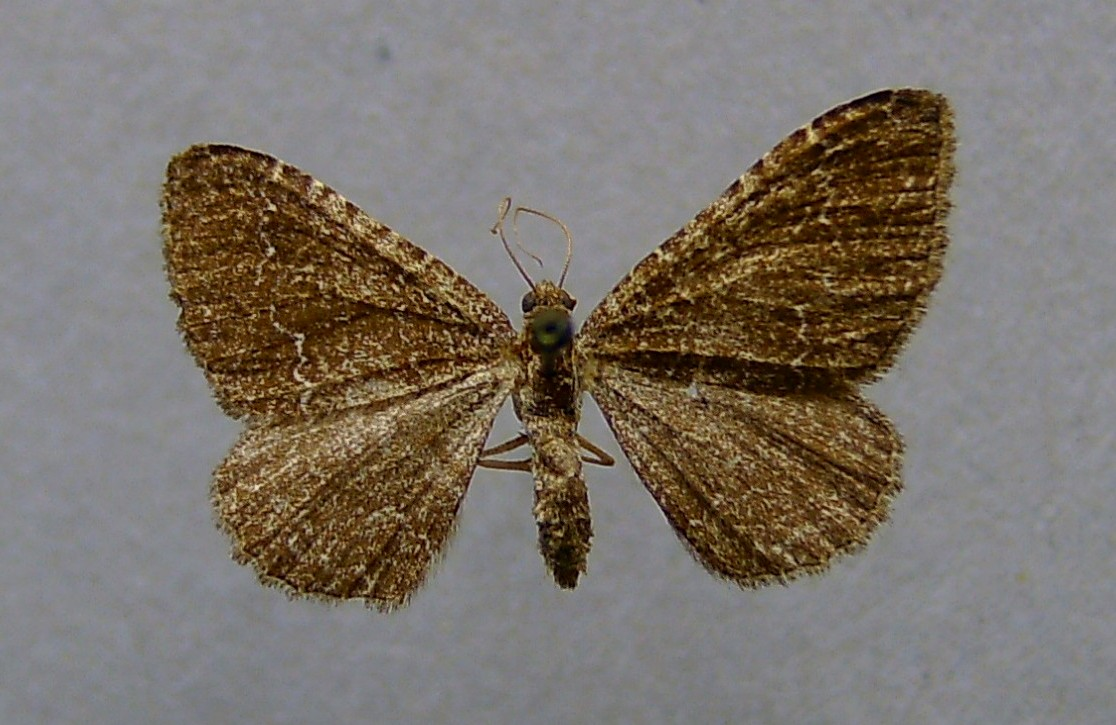
- Cataclysme riguata

Scientific classification
- Kingdom: Animalia
- Phylum: Arthropoda
- Clade: Pancrustacea
- Class: Insecta
- Order: Lepidoptera
- Family: Geometridae
- Tribe: Cataclysmiini
- Genus: Cataclysme; Hübner, 1825

Synonyms
- Paraplaneta Warren, 1895

= Cataclysme =

Genus of moths

Cataclysme is a genus of moths in the family Geometridae.

== Selected species ==
- Cataclysme dissimilata (Rambur, 1833)
- Cataclysme riguata (Hübner, [1813])
- Cataclysme shirniensis Ebert, 1965
- Cataclysme uniformata (Bellier, 1862)
