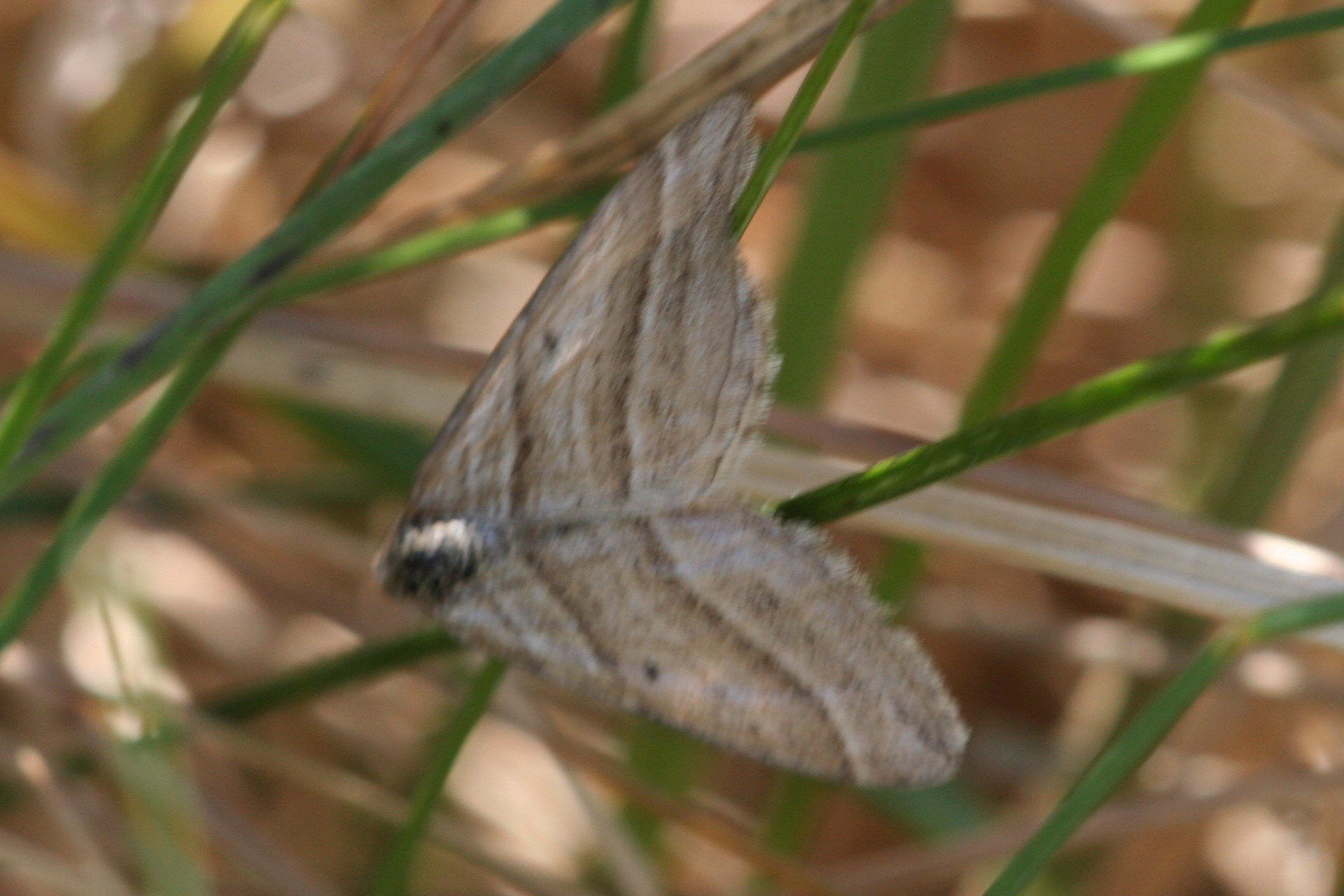
- Phibalapteryx virgata

Scientific classification
- Domain: Eukaryota
- Kingdom: Animalia
- Phylum: Arthropoda
- Class: Insecta
- Order: Lepidoptera
- Family: Geometridae
- Subfamily: Larentiinae
- Tribe: Cataclysmiini

Diversity
- About 118 species in 4 genera

= Cataclysmiini =

Tribe of moths

Cataclysmiini is a tribe of geometer moths in subfamily Larentiinae.

== Taxonomy ==
Genera included in this tribe are:

- Cataclysme Hübner, 1825
- Paraplaneta Warren, 1895
- Phibalapteryx Stephens, 1829
- Piercia Janse, 1933
