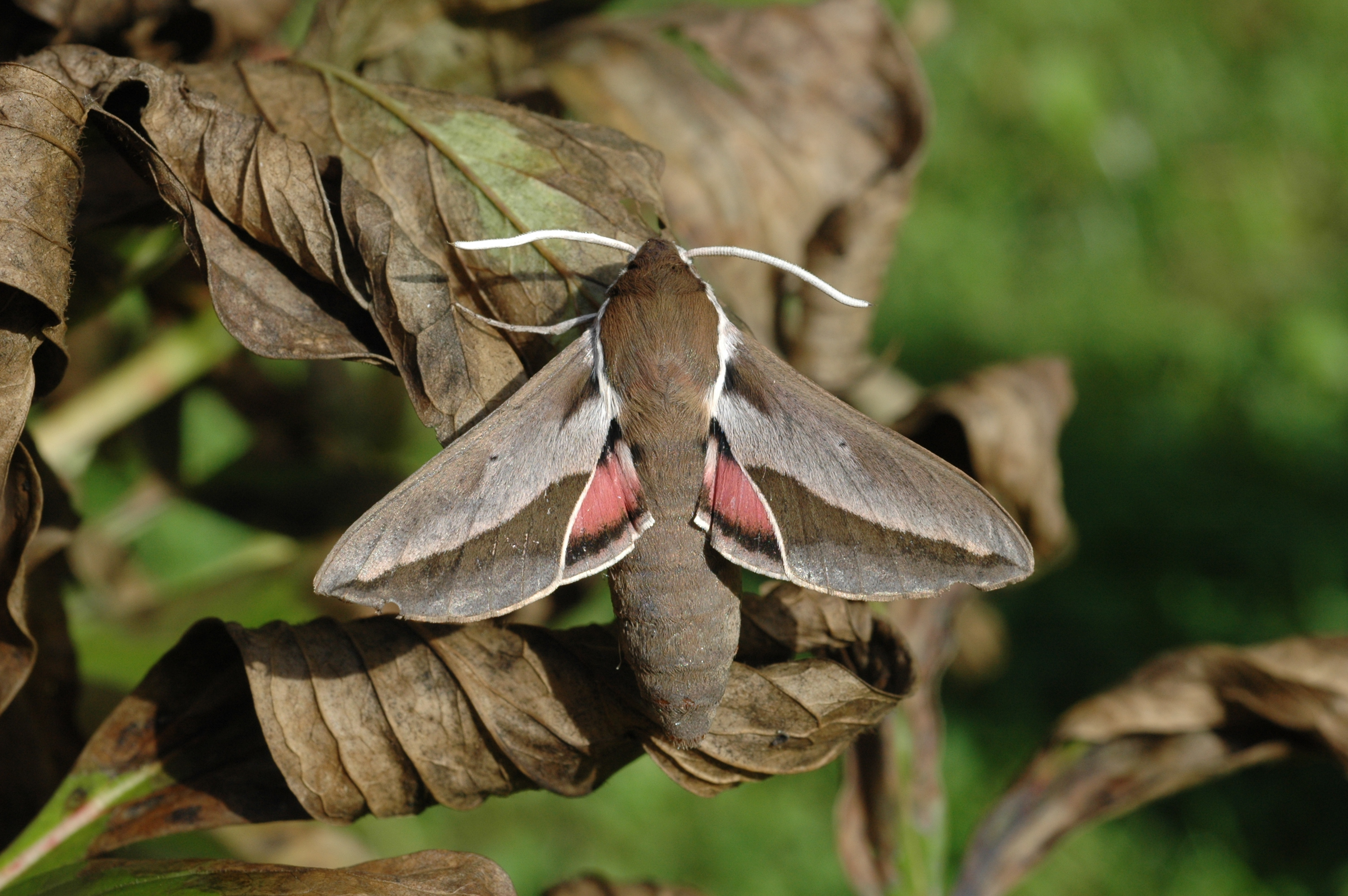

Conservation status
- Data Deficient (IUCN 2.3)

Scientific classification
- Kingdom: Animalia
- Phylum: Arthropoda
- Class: Insecta
- Order: Lepidoptera
- Family: Sphingidae
- Genus: Hyles
- Species: H. hippophaes

Binomial name
- Hyles hippophaes (Esper, 1789)

Synonyms
- Sphinx hippophaes Esper, 1789; Deilephila insidiosa Erschoff, 1874; Celerio hippophaes teriolensis Dannehl, 1929; Celerio hippophaes obscurata Dannehl, 1929; Celerio hippophaes kiortsii Koutsaftikis, 1974; Celerio hippophaes flava Denso, 1913; Celerio hippophaes expallidata Dannehl, 1933; Celerio hippophaes crocea Rebel, 1910; Deilephila hippophaes bienerti Staudinger, 1874; Celerio hippophaes shugnana Sheljuzhko, 1933; Celerio hippophaes ornatus Gehlen, 1930; Celerio hippophaes malatiatus Gehlen, 1934; Celerio hippophaes caucasica Clark, 1922; Celerio hippophaes bucharana Sheljuzhko, 1933; Celerio hippophaes baltistana O. Bang-Haas, 1939; Celerio hippophaes anatolica Rebel, 1933; Hyles hippophaes transcaucasica Gehlen, 1932; Hyles hippophaes caucasica Denso, 1913

= Hyles hippophaes =

Seathorn hawk-moth

Species of moth

Hyles hippophaes, the seathorn hawk-moth, is a species of moth in the family Sphingidae. The species was first described by Eugenius Johann Christoph Esper in 1789.

== Distribution ==
It is found in Afghanistan, Armenia, Azerbaijan, China, France, Georgia, Germany, Greece, Iran, Iraq, Kazakhstan, Kyrgyzstan, Mongolia, Pakistan, Romania, Serbia and Montenegro, Spain, Switzerland, Syria, Tajikistan, Turkey, Turkmenistan, and Uzbekistan.

== Description ==
The wingspan is 65–80 mm.

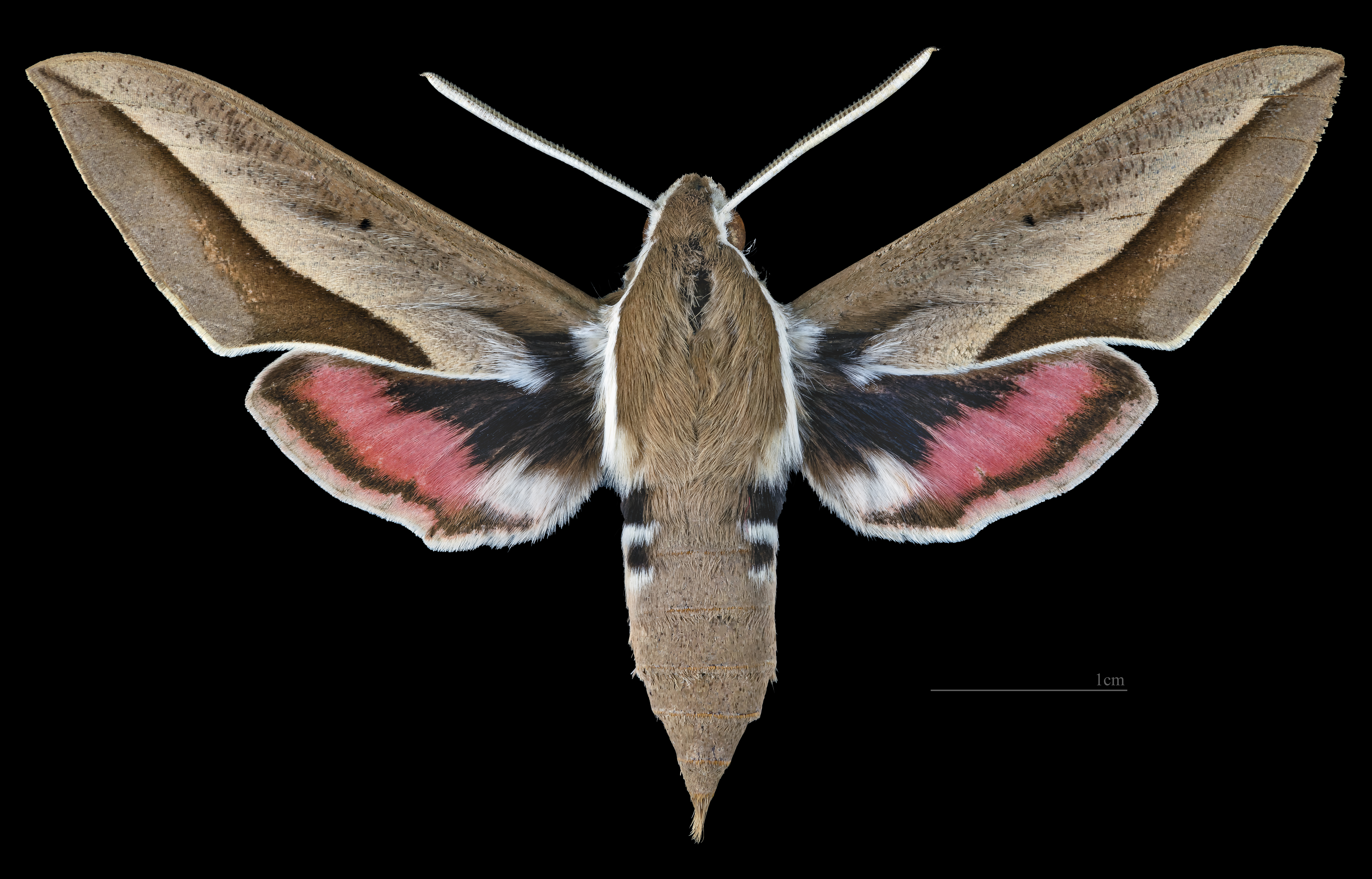
Hyles hippophaes ♂

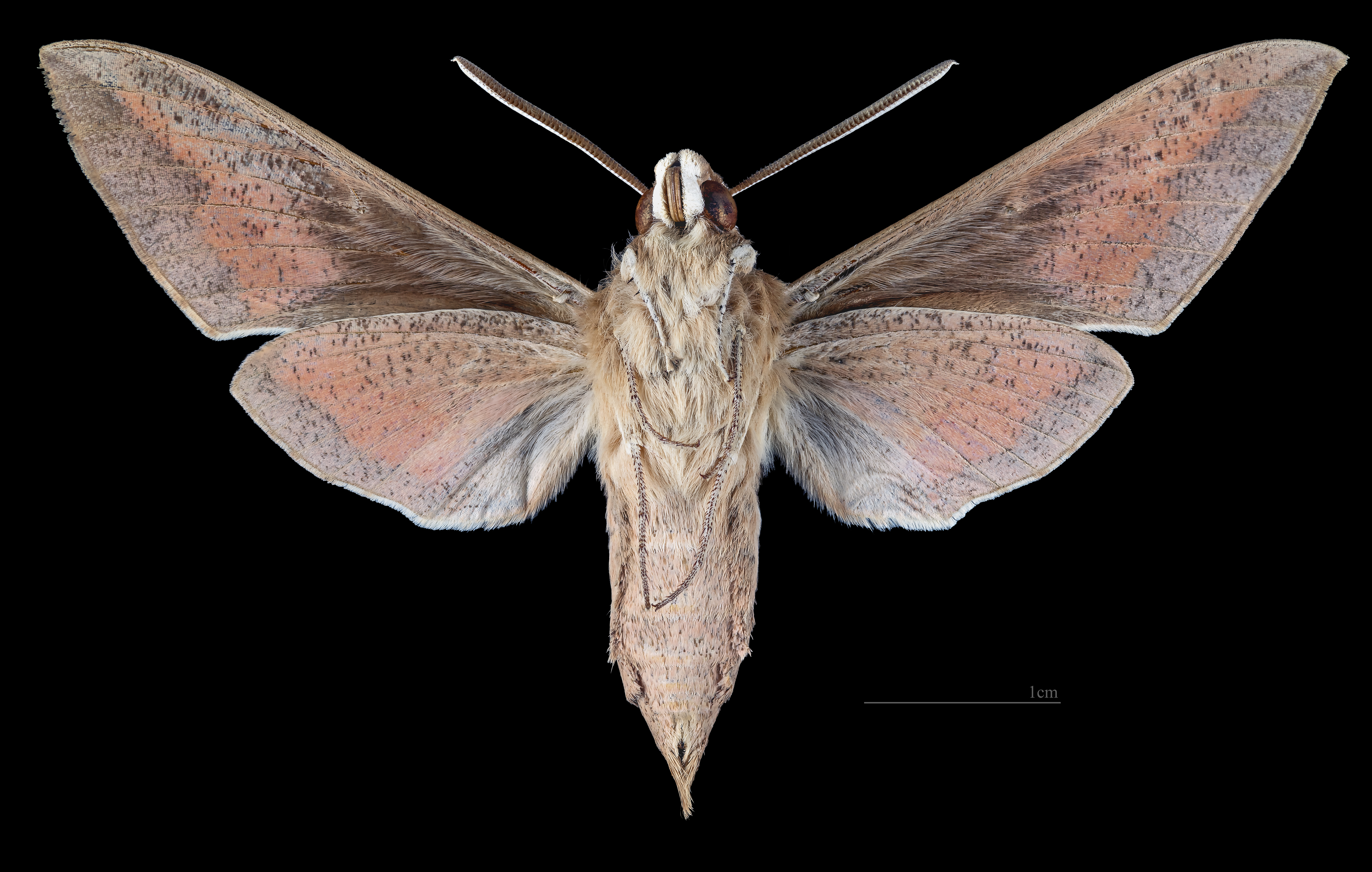
Hyles hippophaes ♂ △

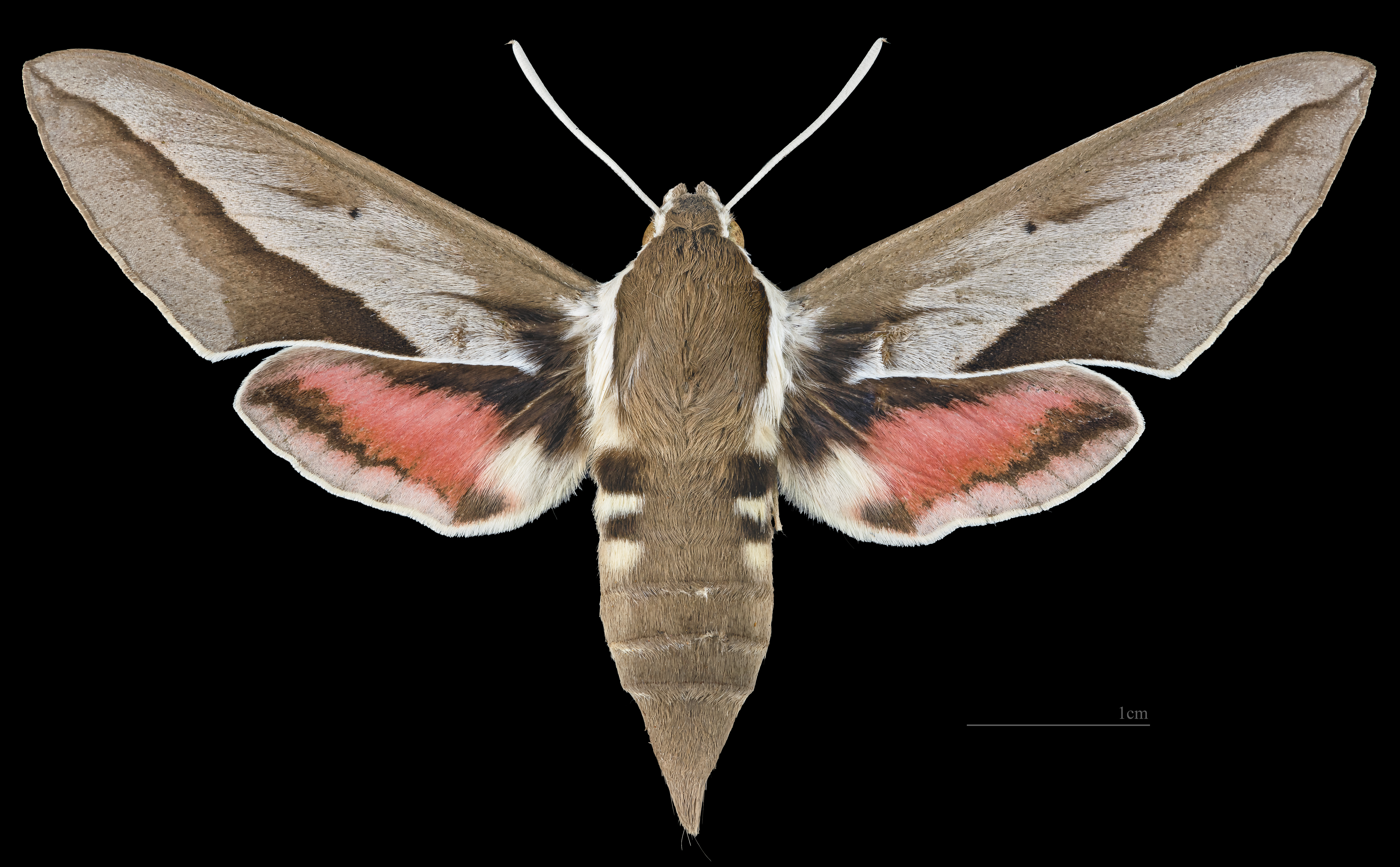
Hyles hippophaes ♀

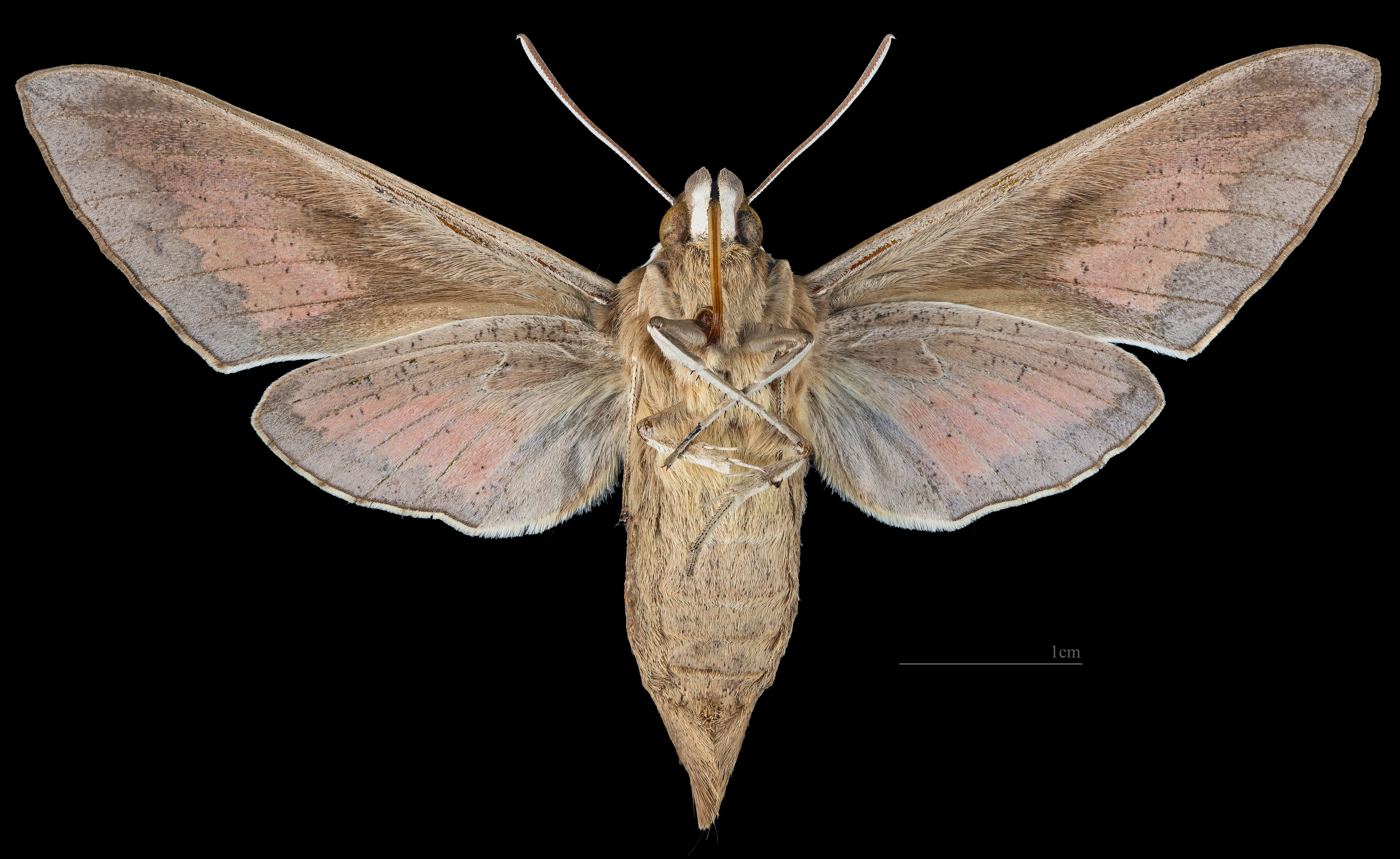
Hyles hippophaes ♀ △

== Biology ==
Larvae of subspecies H. h. bienerti have been recorded on Elaeagnus angustifolia and Hippophae rhamnoides in China and Tajikistan.

== Subspecies ==
- Hyles hippophaes hippophaes
- Hyles hippophaes bienerti (Staudinger, 1874) (from Turkey, the Caucasus and southern Russia, east through Iran, Turkmenistan, Uzbekistan, Tajikistan, Afghanistan to Kashmir and north-western India, and north-east through Kyrgyzstan and eastern Kazakhstan to northern China, Mongolia, Lake Baikal and Tuva in Russia)
- Hyles hippophaes miatleuskii Eitschberger & Saldaitis, 2000 (Kazakhstan)
