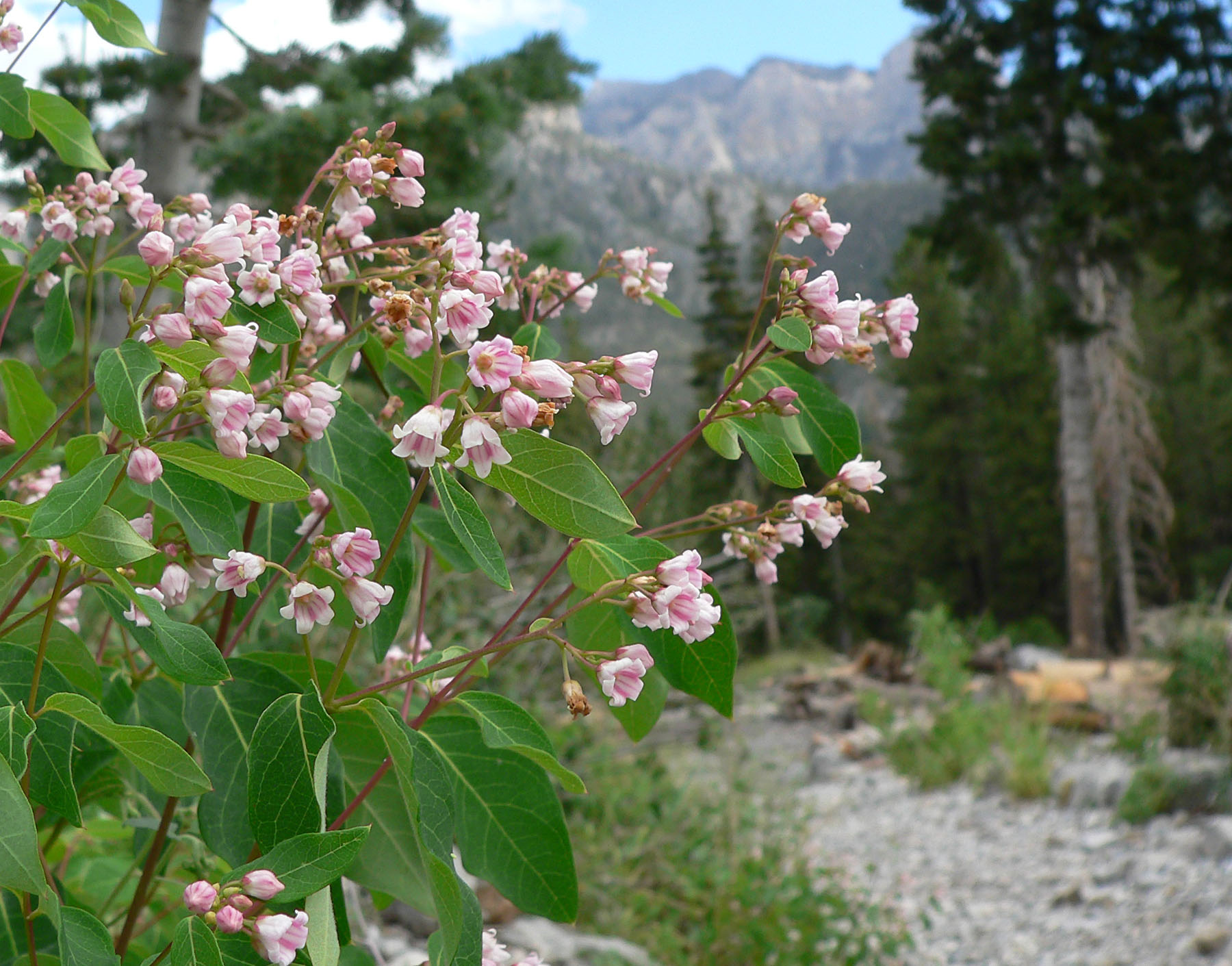
- A. androsaemifolium var. androsaemifolium in the Spring Mountains, southern Nevada, about 2,400 m (7,900 ft) above sea level

Conservation status
- Secure (NatureServe)

Scientific classification
- Kingdom: Plantae
- Clade: Embryophytes
- Clade: Tracheophytes
- Clade: Angiosperms
- Clade: Eudicots
- Clade: Asterids
- Order: Gentianales
- Family: Apocynaceae
- Genus: Apocynum
- Species: A. androsaemifolium

Binomial name
- Apocynum androsaemifolium L.

Synonyms
- Cynopaema androsaemifolium (L.) Lunell; Apocynum ambigens Greene; Apocynum macranthum Rydb.; Apocynum griseum Greene; Apocynum muscipulum Moench; Apocynum clandestinum Raf.; Apocynum rhomboideum Greene; Apocynum scopulorum Greene ex Rydb.; Apocynum silvaticum Greene; Apocynum tomentellum Greene; Apocynum arcuatum Greene; Apocynum cinereum A.Heller; Apocynum diversifolium Greene; Apocynum polycardium Greene; Apocynum pulchellum Greene

= Apocynum androsaemifolium =

Spreading dogbane

Species of plant

Apocynum androsaemifolium, the fly-trap dogbane or spreading dogbane, is a flowering plant in the Gentianales order. It is common across Canada and much of the United States excepting the deep southeast.

== Description ==
Apocynum androsaemifolium is a perennial herb with branching stems, hairs on the underside of the leaves, and no hair on the stems. It grows to 20–30 centimetres (8–12 inches), exceptionally 50 cm (20 in). Milky sap appears on broken stems.

Its leaves appear as pointed ovals, with entire leaf margins and alternate venation. Pairs of pink flowers bloom at the end of stalks between June and September. Two seed pods 12.5–17.5 cm (5–7 in) in length contain silky-haired seeds.

== Taxonomy ==
=== Subspecies and varieties ===
Subspecies and varieties include:

1. Apocynum androsaemifolium subsp. androsaemifolium – E Canada, W United States
2. Apocynum androsaemifolium var. griseum (Greene) Bég. & Belosersky – Ontario, British Columbia, Washington State, Oregon, Idaho, Indiana, Michigan
3. Apocynum androsaemifolium var. incanum A.DC. – widespread in Canada, United States, NE Mexico
4. Apocynum androsaemifolium var. intermedium Woodson – Colorado
5. Apocynum androsaemifolium subsp. pumilum (A.Gray) B.Boivin – British Columbia, Washington State, Oregon, Idaho, California, Utah, Montana, Wyoming, Nevada
6. Apocynum androsaemifolium var. tomentellum (Greene) B.Boivin – British Columbia, Washington State, Oregon, Idaho, California, Nevada
7. Apocynum androsaemifolium var. woodsonii B.Boivin – Alberta, British Columbia, Washington State, Wyoming, Nevada, Idaho

=== Etymology ===
Apocynum androsaemifolium Linnaeus. From the Greek 'apo': far from and 'kyôn': dog, because of its toxic effects on dogs; Androsema-leaved androsaemifolium (Hypericum androsaemum).

== Distribution and habitat ==
The plant is widespread across most of Canada, the United States (including Alaska but excluding Florida), and northeast Mexico. Its native habitats include forests, woodlands, forest edges, prairies, meadows, and fields. It prefers dry soils at low to medium elevations.

== Ecology ==
Animals naturally avoid the plant.

== Toxicity ==
The plant is poisonous due to the cardiac glycosides and resins it contains. Escalating doses usually cause vomiting and diarrhea. Other symptoms include dizziness, colour hallucinations, cold sweats, and excessive urination. In extreme cases, the heart rate may slow before fatal convulsions. Young milkweed shoots must be distinguished from those of Apocynum androsaemifolium because they appear at the same time.

== Uses ==
Native Americans used spreading dogbane in numerous ways. The plant was used as a medicine to treat ailments including headaches, convulsions, ear ache, heart palpitations, colds, insanity, dizziness, rheumatism, scrofula, and syphilis. The plant can also be used as a contraceptive. Among the Ojibwe, the root was used as a gynecological, oral, and throat aid, as well as an analgesic for headaches and a diuretic during pregnancy. The Ojibwe also consumed the root of the plant during the medicine lodge ceremony. The Forest Potawatomi made medicinal use of the roots as well, and the Prairie Potawatomi used the plant's fruits to treat heart and kidney problems. The stem fibers of the plant are very strong, and Native Americans used them as a thread for sewing. Outside of the Americas, spreading dogbane was also used to treat heart disease in Europe during the first half of the 20th century.
