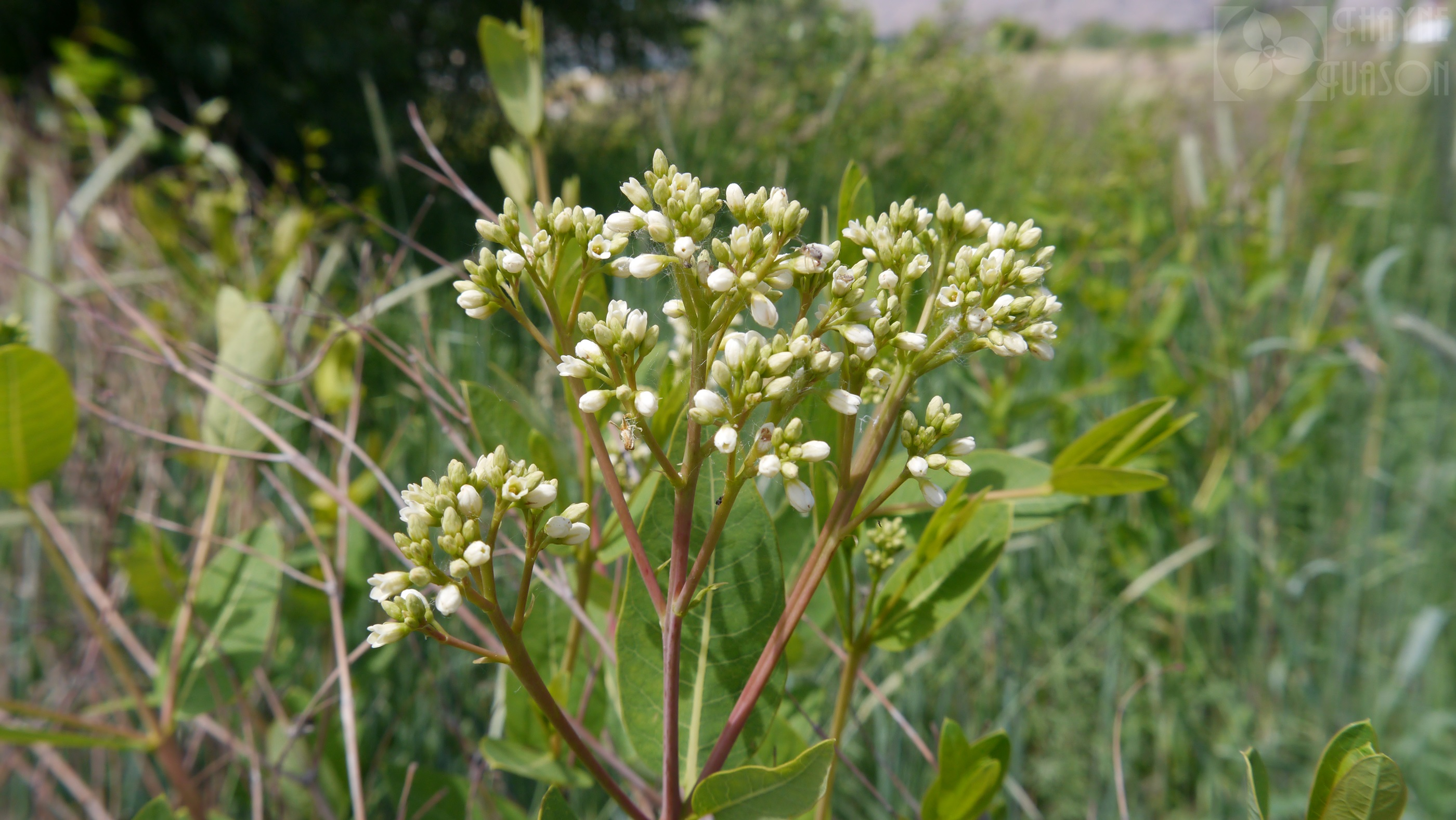
- Apocynum cannabinum in flower

Conservation status
- Secure (NatureServe)

Scientific classification
- Kingdom: Plantae
- Clade: Tracheophytes
- Clade: Angiosperms
- Clade: Eudicots
- Clade: Asterids
- Order: Gentianales
- Family: Apocynaceae
- Genus: Apocynum
- Species: A. cannabinum

Binomial name
- Apocynum cannabinum L.
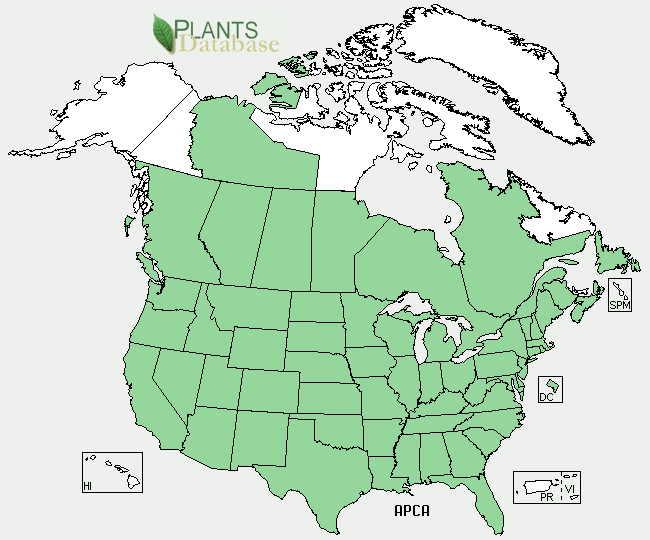
- Natural range in North America

Synonyms
- Cynopaema cannabinum

= Apocynum cannabinum =

Plant species in the dogbane family

Apocynum cannabinum (dogbane, amy root, hemp dogbane, prairie dogbane, Indian hemp, hemp dogsbane, rheumatism root, dogsbane, or wild cotton) is a perennial herbaceous plant that grows throughout much of North America—in the southern half of Canada and throughout the United States. It is poisonous to humans, dogs, cats, and horses. All parts of the plant contain toxic cardiac glycosides that can cause potentially fatal cardiac arrhythmias if ingested. Some Lepidoptera can withstand the toxins and feed on this plant.

== Description ==
Apocynum cannabinum grows up to 1 m (3 ft 3 in) tall. The stems are reddish and contain a milky latex. The leaves are opposite, simple, broad, and lanceolate, 7–15 cm (2 3/4–6 in) long and 3–5 cm (1 1/4–2 in) broad, entire, and smooth on top with white hairs on the underside. It flowers from July to August, has large sepals, and a five-lobed white corolla. The flowers are hermaphrodite, with both male and female organs. The seeds have white, silky hairs to aid in wind dispersal, but the lightweight seed is also able to disperse via water due to its light weight. The root system consists of short rhizomes and horizontal roots.

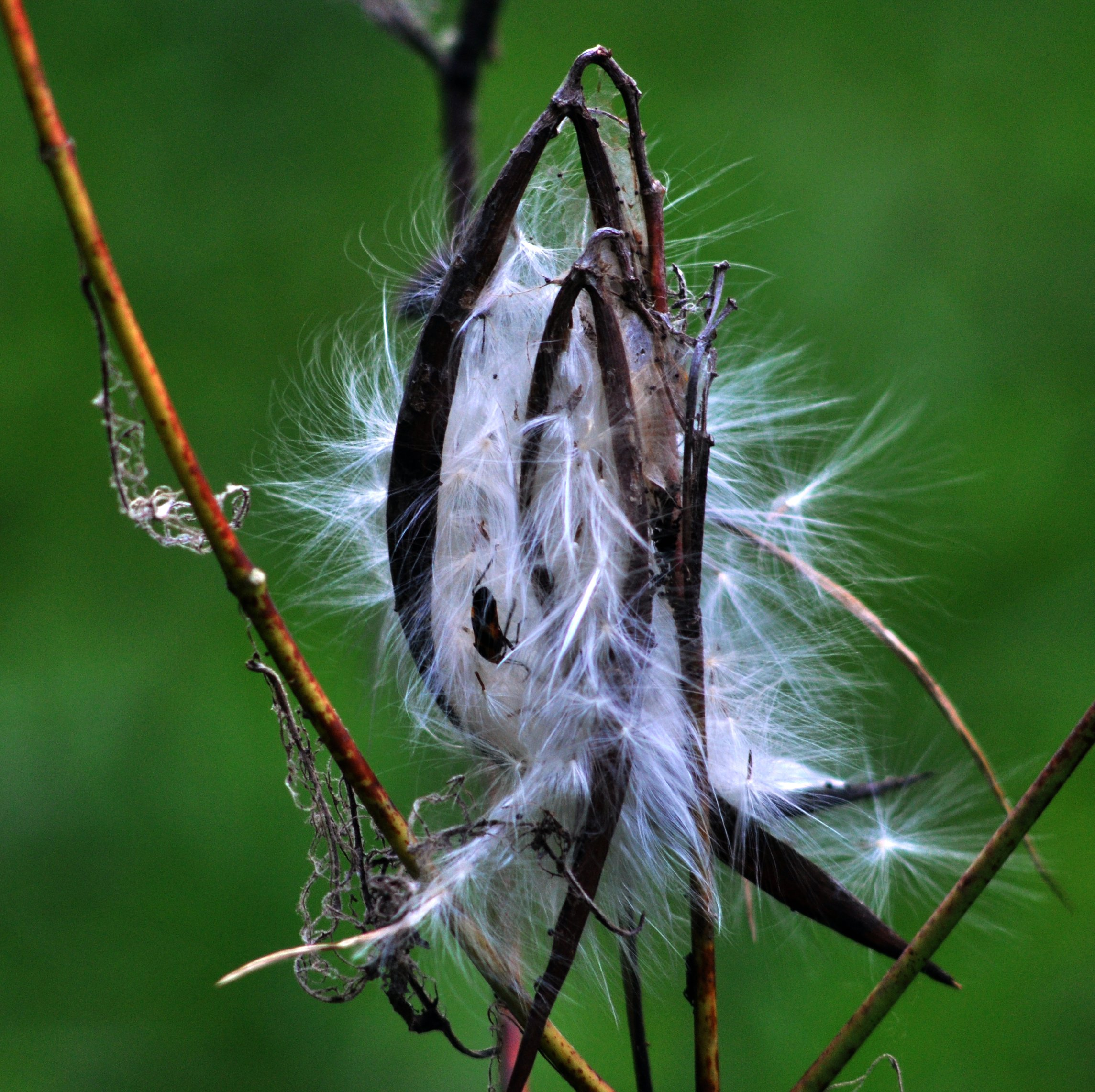
Apocynum cannabinum fruits and seeds

== Taxonomy ==
Apocynum cannabinum was described and named by Carl Linnaeus in 1753. It is classified in the genus Apocynum, a part of the family Apocynaceae. It has no accepted subspecies, but it has 90 synonyms.

Table of Synonyms
Name	Year	Rank	Notes
Apocynum album Greene	1897	species	= het.
Apocynum angustifolium Wooton	1913	species	= het., nom. illeg.
Apocynum arenarium Greene	1912	species	= het.
Apocynum bebbianum Greene	1912	species	= het.
Apocynum bolanderi Greene	1912	species	= het.
Apocynum breweri Greene	1912	species	= het.
Apocynum canadense Shecut	1806	species	= het.
Apocynum cannabinum var. album (Greene) Bég. & Belosersky	1913	variety	= het.
Apocynum cannabinum var. angustifolium N.H.Holmgren	1984	variety	= het.
Apocynum cannabinum f. arenarium (Greene) B.Boivin	1966	form	= het.
Apocynum cannabinum var. bolanderi (Greene) Bég. & Belosersky	1913	variety	= het.
Apocynum cannabinum subsp. cordigerum (Greene) Á.Löve & D.Löve	1982	subspecies	= het.
Apocynum cannabinum var. estellinum (Greene) Bég. & Belosersky	1913	variety	= het.
Apocynum cannabinum var. floribundum Bég. & Belosersky	1913	variety	= het.
Apocynum cannabinum var. glaberrimum A.DC.	1844	variety	= het.
Apocynum cannabinum var. greeneanum (Bég. & Belosersky) Woodson	1930	variety	= het.
Apocynum cannabinum var. hypericifolium (Aiton) A.Gray	1848	variety	= het.
Apocynum cannabinum var. incanum Bég. & Belosersky	1913	variety	= het.
Apocynum cannabinum var. isophyllum (Greene) Bég. & Belosersky	1913	variety	= het.
Apocynum cannabinum var. lanceolatum Durand & Hilg.	1854	variety	= het.
Apocynum cannabinum var. nemorale (G.S.Mill.) Fernald	1908	variety	= het.
Apocynum cannabinum var. oliganthum Bég. & Belosersky	1913	variety	= het.
Apocynum cannabinum var. palustre Bég. & Belosersky	1913	variety	= het.
Apocynum cannabinum f. pennsilvanicum Bég. & Belosersky	1913	form	= het.
Apocynum cannabinum var. puberulum Bég. & Belosersky	1913	variety	= het.
Apocynum cannabinum f. pubescens (Mitch. ex R.Br.) Voss	1894	form	= het.
Apocynum cannabinum var. pubescens (Mitch. ex R.Br.) A.DC.	1844	variety	= het.
Apocynum cannabinum var. suksdorfii (Greene) Bég. & Belosersky	1913	variety	= het.
Apocynum cannabinum var. typicum Bég. & Belosersky	1913	variety	≡ hom., not validly publ.
Apocynum carolinii Nieuwl.	1913	species	= het.
Apocynum cervinum Greene	1912	species	= het.
Apocynum cinereum Nieuwl.	1913	species	= het., nom. illeg.
Apocynum cordigerum Greene	1911	species	= het.
Apocynum cuspidatum Greene ex Bég. & Belosersky	1913	species	= het.
Apocynum densiflorum Greene	1912	species	= het.
Apocynum dictyotum Greene	1912	species	= het.
Apocynum dimidiatum Raf.	1840	species	= het.
Apocynum estellinum Greene	1912	species	= het.
Apocynum farwellii Greene	1912	species	= het.
Apocynum farwellii f. anomalum Farw.	1916	form	= het.
Apocynum farwellii var. glaucum Farw.	1916	variety	= het.
Apocynum farwellii f. ternarium Farw.	1916	form	= het.
Apocynum farwellii f. verticillare Farw.	1916	form	= het.
Apocynum greeneanum Bég. & Belosersky	1913	species	= het.
Apocynum hypericifolium Aiton	1789	species	= het.
Apocynum hypericifolium var. angustifolium Bég. & Belosersky	1913	variety	= het.
Apocynum hypericifolium f. arenarium (Greene) F.C.Gates	1911	form	= het.
Apocynum hypericifolium var. cordigerum (Greene) Bég. & Belosersky	1913	variety	= het.
Apocynum hypericifolium var. farwellii (Greene) Woodson	1930	variety	= het.
Apocynum hypericifolium var. intermedium Bég. & Belosersky	1913	variety	= het.
Apocynum hypericifolium var. myrianthum (Greene) Bég. & Belosersky	1913	variety	= het.
Apocynum hypericifolium var. nevadense (Goodd.) Bég. & Belosersky	1913	variety	= het.
Apocynum hypericifolium var. oblongum (Greene) Bég. & Belosersky	1913	variety	= het.
Apocynum hypericifolium var. salignum (Greene) Bég. & Belosersky	1913	variety	= het.
Apocynum hypericifolium var. typicum Bég. & Belosersky	1913	variety	= het., not validly publ.
Apocynum isophyllum Greene	1912	species	= het.
Apocynum ithacense Greene	1912	species	= het.
Apocynum laurinum Greene	1902	species	= het.
Apocynum littorale Greene	1912	species	= het.
Apocynum longifolium Greene	1912	species	= het.
Apocynum macounii Greene ex Bég. & Belosersky	1913	species	= het.
Apocynum missouriense Greene	1912	species	= het.
Apocynum myrianthum Greene	1904	species	= het.
Apocynum nemorale G.S.Mill.	1900	species	= het.
Apocynum neogeum Bég. & Belosersky	1913	species	= het.
Apocynum nevadense Goodd.	1904	species	= het.
Apocynum oblongum Greene	1902	species	= het.
Apocynum oliganthum Greene	1904	species	= het.
Apocynum palustre Greene	1904	species	= het.
Apocynum piscatorium Douglas ex A.DC	1844	species	= het.
Apocynum platyphyllum Greene	1912	species	= het.
Apocynum procerum Greene	1912	species	= het.
Apocynum pubescens Mitch. ex R.Br.	1811	species	= het.
Apocynum purpureum Tausch	1836	species	= het.
Apocynum salignum Greene	1902	species	= het.
Apocynum sibiricum Jacq.	1777	species	= het.
Apocynum sibiricum f. arenarium (Greene) Fernald	1935	form	= het.
Apocynum sibiricum var. cordigerum (Greene) Fernald	1935	variety	= het.
Apocynum sibiricum var. farwellii (Greene) Woodson	1938	variety	= het.
Apocynum sibiricum var. salignum (Greene) Fernald	1935	variety	= het.
Apocynum subuligerum Greene	1912	species	= het.
Apocynum suksdorfii Greene	1902	species	= het.
Apocynum suksdorfii var. angustifolium (Bég. & Belosersky) Woodson	1930	variety	= het.
Apocynum suksdorfii var. typicum Greene	1902	variety	= het., not validly publ.
Apocynum thermale Greene	1912	species	= het.
Apocynum tomentulosum Nieuwl.	1913	species	= het.
Apocynum venetum A.DC.	1844	species	= het., nom. illeg.
Cynopaema cannabinum (L.) Lunell	1916	species	≡ hom.
Cynopaema hypericifolium (Aiton) Lunell	1916	species	= het.
Forsteronia pavonii A.DC.	1844	species	= het.
Notes: ≡ homotypic synonym; = heterotypic synonym

=== Etymology ===
Apocynum means "poisonous to dogs". The specific epithet cannabinum, and the common names hemp dogbane and Indian hemp refer to its similarity to Cannabis as a source of fiber. It likely got its name from its resemblance to a European species of the same name. It is called qéemu [qǽːmu] in Nez Perce and [taxʷɨ́s] in Sahaptin. The Maidu Concow people call the plant pö (Konkow language).

== Distribution and habitat ==
Apocynum cannabinum grows in open wooded areas, ditches, and hillsides. It is found in gravelly or sandy soil, mainly near streams in shady or moist places. It is also found in human-disturbed habitats. It is native to much of North America—in the southern half of Canada and throughout the United States.

== Ecology ==
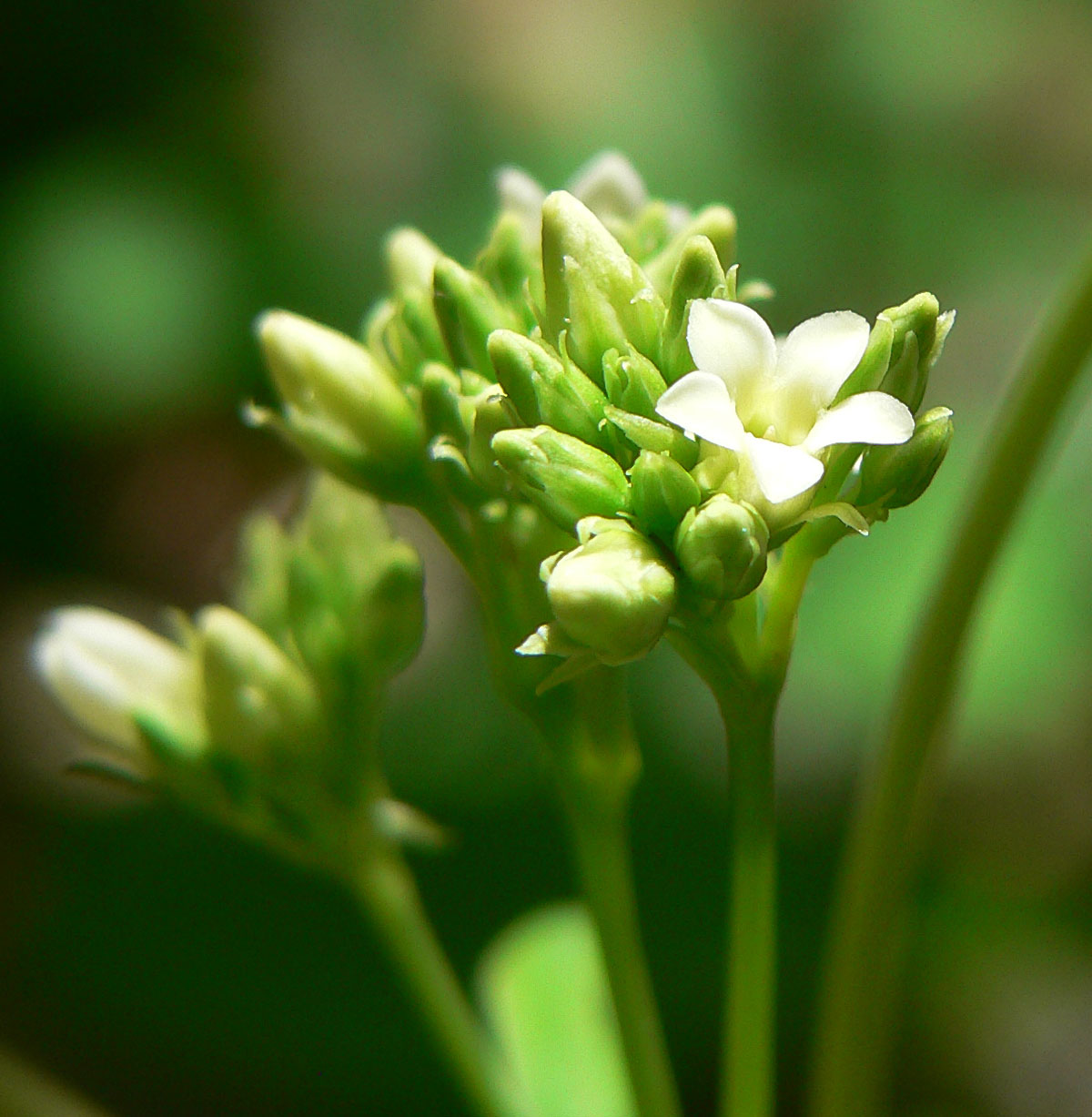
Apocynum cannabinum flowers

The plant serves as a larval host for the snowberry clearwing (Hemaris diffinis), which is a pollinator that resembles a small hummingbird. It is also a host plant for the dogbane tiger moth (Cycnia tenera) and the zebra caterpillar (Melanchra picta). The larvae of Marmara apocynella feed on the stems, making a "long whitish serpentine mine". Apocynum cannabinum is primarily pollinated by insects that are attracted to the fragrance and nectar of the flower.

== Toxicity ==
It is poisonous to humans, dogs, cats, and horses. All parts of the plant are toxic and contain cardiac glycosides. The plant is toxic both green and dried. The stems contain a white sap capable of causing skin blisters.

== Uses ==
=== Fiber ===
Much like flax and hemp, Apocynum cannabinum contains long fibers in the stems, known as bast fibers, which can be extracted and used to create textiles. The fibers are very fine and strong, with a silky texture, and easier to process than hemp. The stalks of this plant have been used as a source of fiber by Native Americans to make bows, fire-bows, nets, tie-down straps, hunting nets, fishing lines, bags, and clothing. According to Craig Bates of the Yosemite Museum, five stalks of the plant are needed to make one foot of cordage. A large bag used for storing roots would take one to three months to complete. The stems should be harvested in the fall, after the leaves have fallen and the stalks have turned a deep reddish-brown color. Since cutting the stalks promotes regrowth in the spring, as much as possible should be harvested. Unused stems are traditionally cleared away by burning, which causes the plant to grow back taller and straighter in spring.

=== Food ===
The seeds have an edible use as a meal (raw or cooked) when ground into a powder.

=== Chewing gum ===
The plant's latex sap can be squeezed from the plant and allowed to stand overnight to harden into a white gum which can be used (sometimes mixed with clean clay) as chewing gum.

=== Phytoremediation ===
Apocynum cannabinum can be used to sequester lead in its biomass by taking it up from the soil through its roots. This process, called phytoremediation, could help clean sites contaminated with lead.

=== Medicinal ===
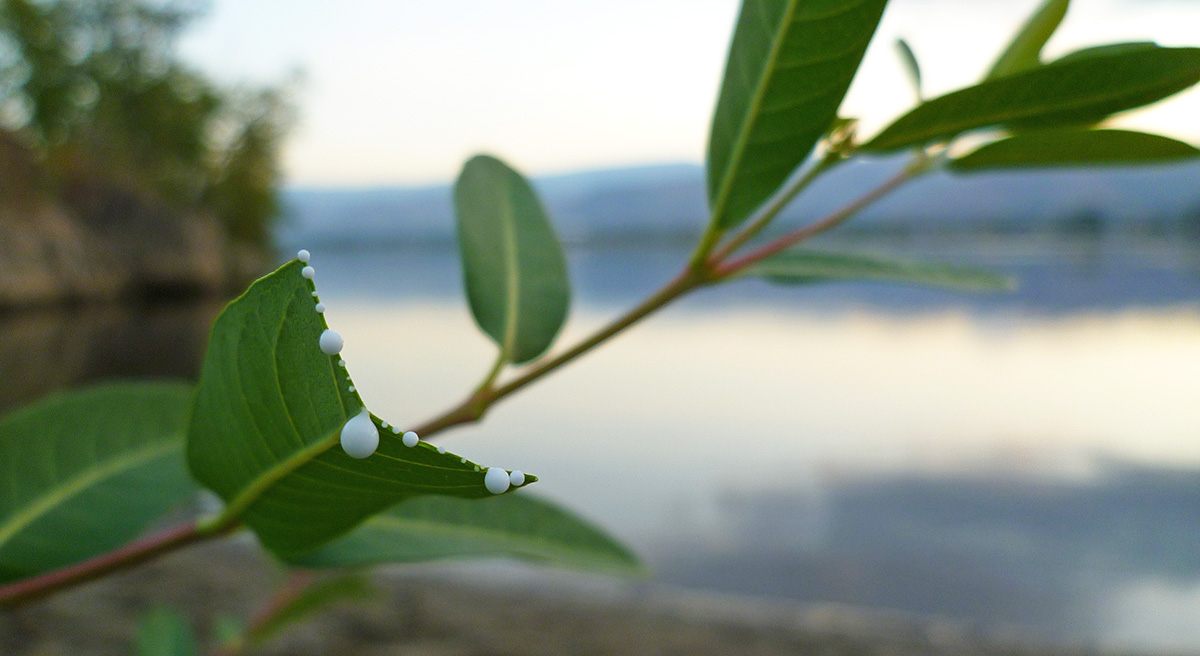
Apocynum cannabinum showing sap from a broken leaf

It is used in herbal medicine to treat fever and to slow the pulse. Apocynum cannabinum has been employed by various Native American tribes to treat a wide variety of complaints including rheumatism, coughs, pox, whooping cough, asthma, internal parasites, diarrhea, and to increase lactation. The root has been used as a tonic, cardiotonic, diaphoretic, diuretic, an emetic (to induce vomiting), and an expectorant. It is harvested in the autumn and dried for later use. The fresh root is medicinally the most active part. A weak tea made from the dried root has been used for cardiac diseases and as a vermifuge (an agent that expels parasitic worms). The milky sap is a folk remedy for genital warts. However, both illness and deaths have resulted from use as a medicine.
