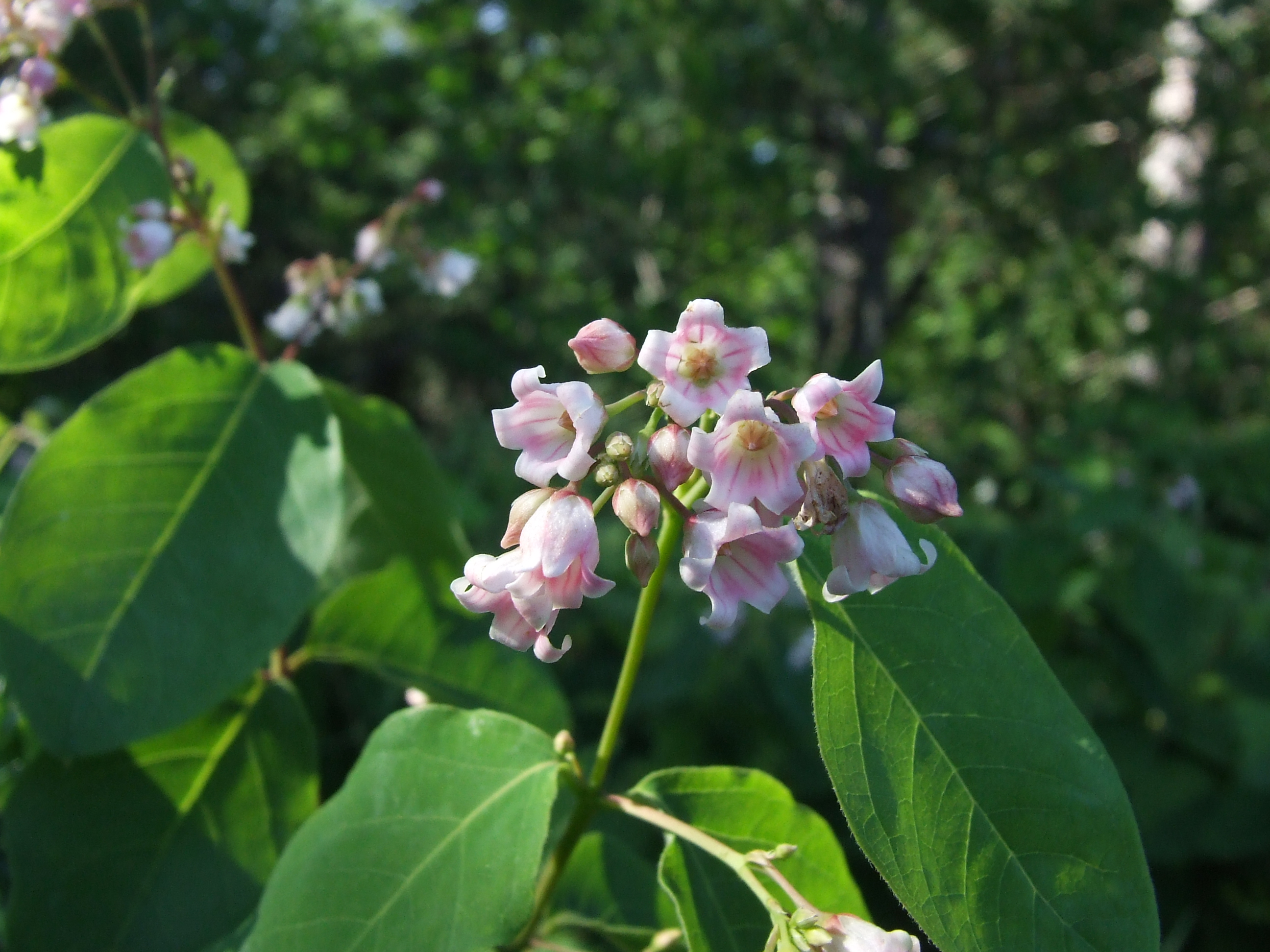
- Apocynum androsaemifolium

Scientific classification
- Kingdom: Plantae
- Clade: Tracheophytes
- Clade: Angiosperms
- Clade: Eudicots
- Clade: Asterids
- Order: Gentianales
- Family: Apocynaceae
- Subfamily: Apocynoideae
- Tribe: Apocyneae
- Genus: Apocynum; L.

Synonyms
- Apocynastrum Heist. ex Fabr.; Cynopaema Lunell; Poacynum Baill.; Trachomitum Woodson

= Apocynum =

Genus of flowering plants

Apocynum, commonly known as dogbane or Indian hemp, is a small genus of the flowering plant family Apocynaceae. Its name comes from Ancient Greek ἀπόκυνον, from ἀπο- apo- "away" and κύων kyōn "dog", referring to dogbane (Cionura erecta), which was used to poison dogs. The genus is native to North America, temperate Asia, and southeastern Europe.

Apocynum species are used as food plants by the larvae of some Lepidoptera species, including the queen butterfly and the mouse moth.

== Uses ==
Apocynum cannabinum is used as a source of fiber by Native Americans. Apocynum venetum (Chinese: 羅布麻) is used as an herbal tea in China. Dogbane contains cymarin, a cardiotonic agent formerly used to treat cardiac arrhythmia in humans.

== Species ==
Almost 300 names have been proposed in the genus for species, subspecies, and forms. As of 2019, only the following five species and hybrids are currently recognized, with several subspecies and varieties accepted for A. androsaemifolium and A. venetum (see their respective species pages).

- Apocynum androsaemifolium L. – Canada, United States, northeastern Mexico
- Apocynum cannabinum L. – Canada, United States
- Apocynum × floribundum Greene (a hybrid of A. androsaemifolium and A. cannabinum) – Canada, United States, northern Mexico
- Apocynum pictum Schrenk – China, Mongolia, Kazakhstan, Kyrgyzstan, Tajikistan
- Apocynum venetum L. – southeastern Europe and Asia
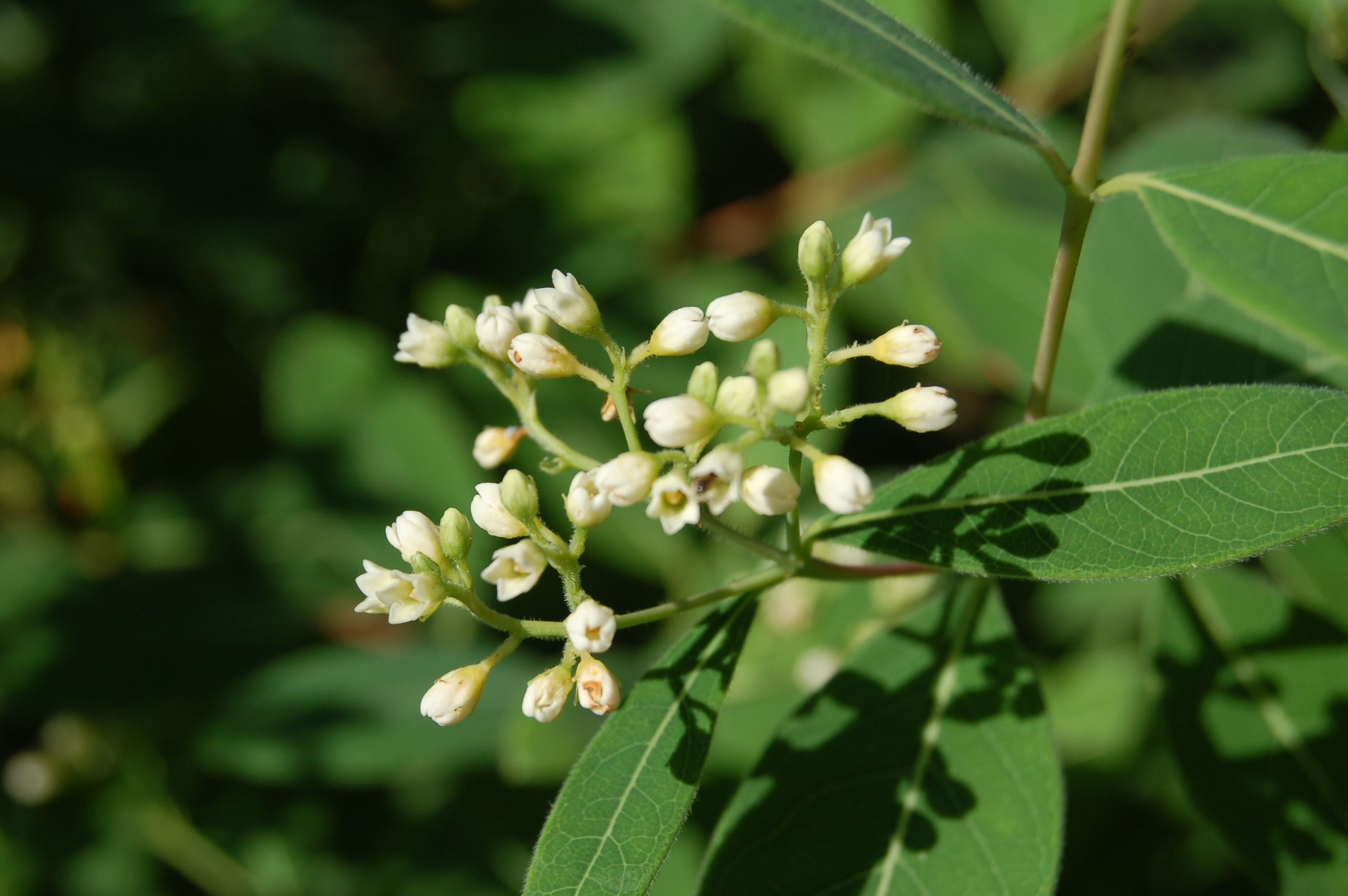
Flowers of Apocynum cannabinum

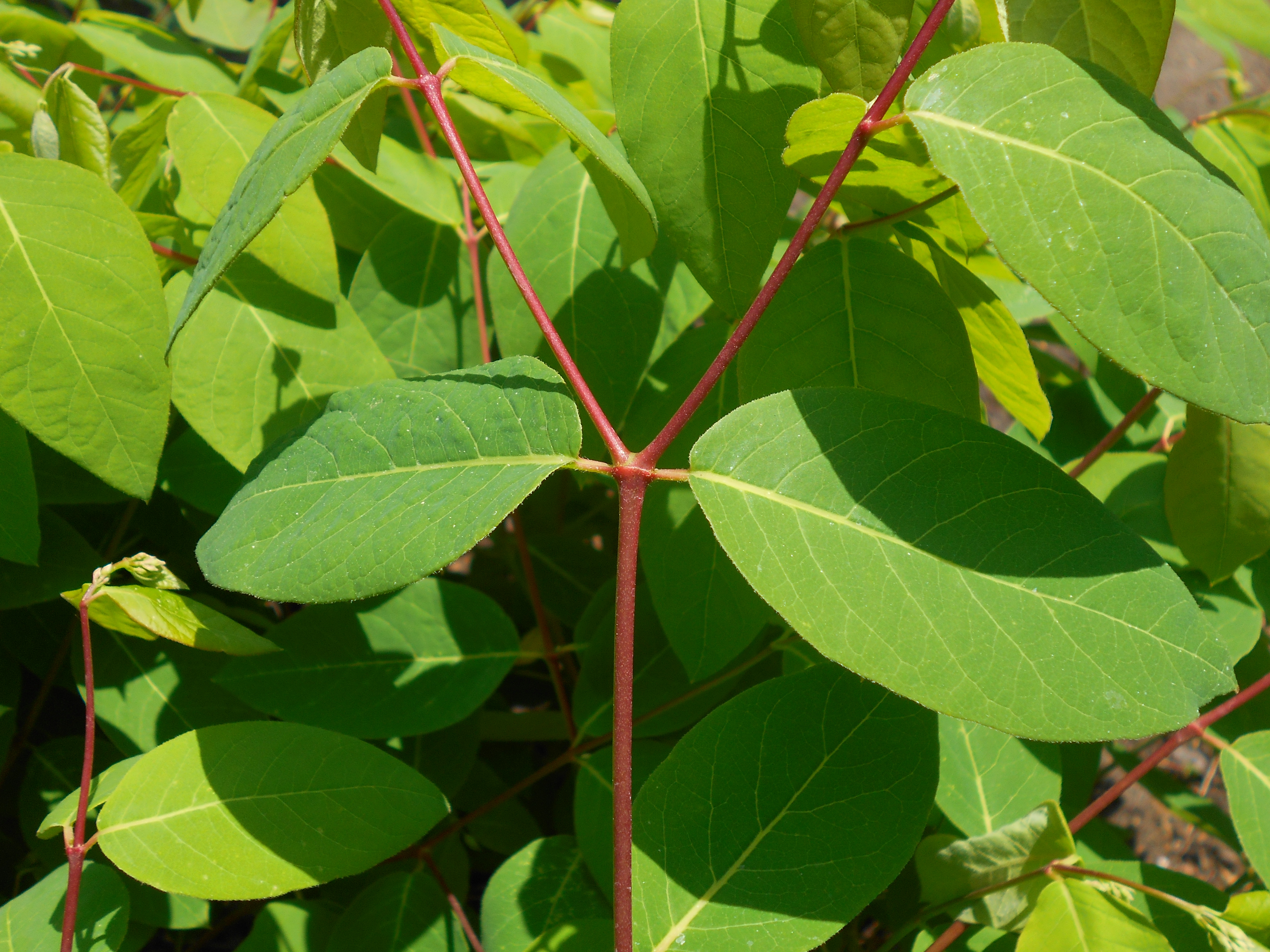
Leaves of Apocynum androsaemifolium

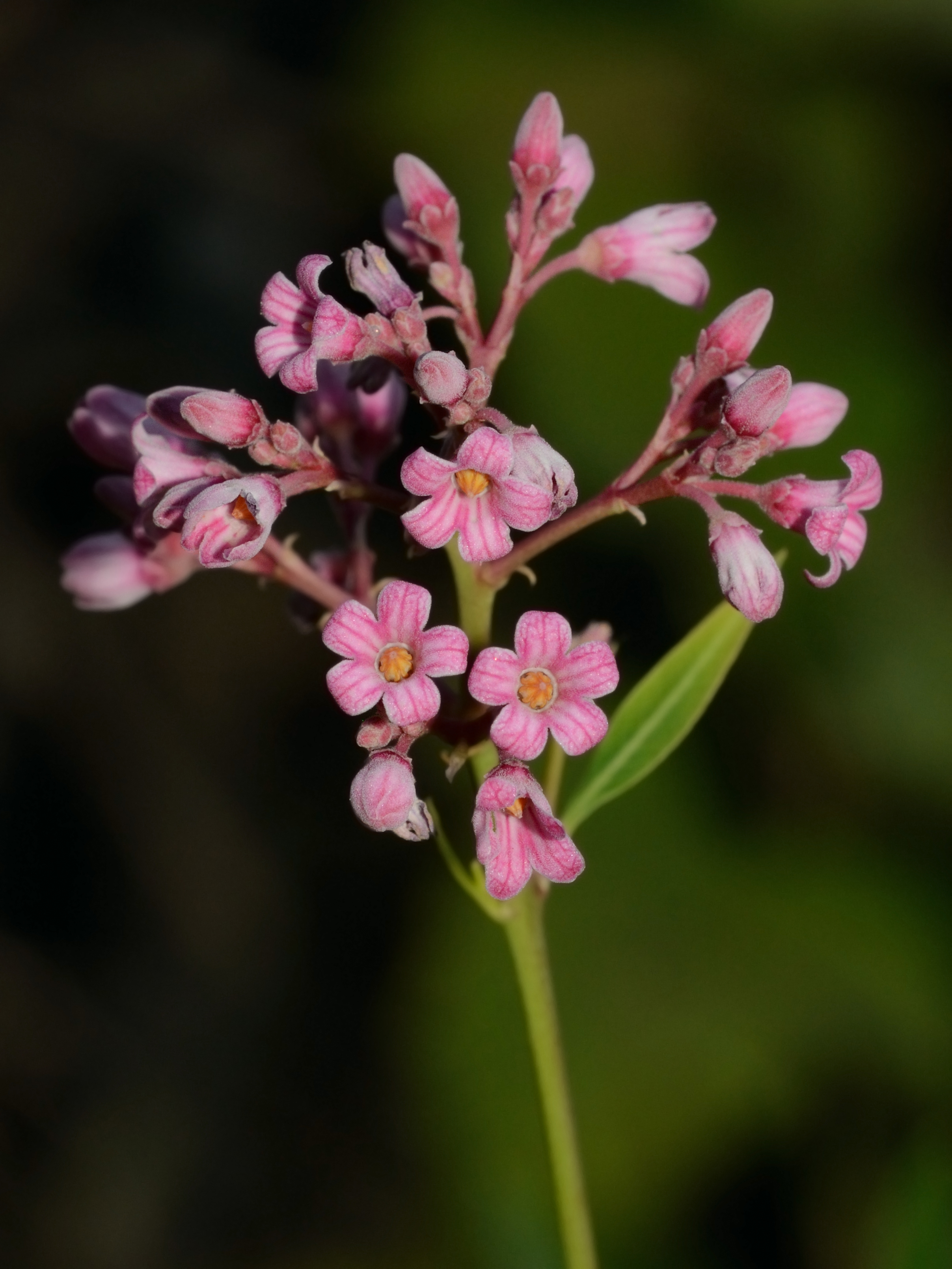
Apocynum venetum
