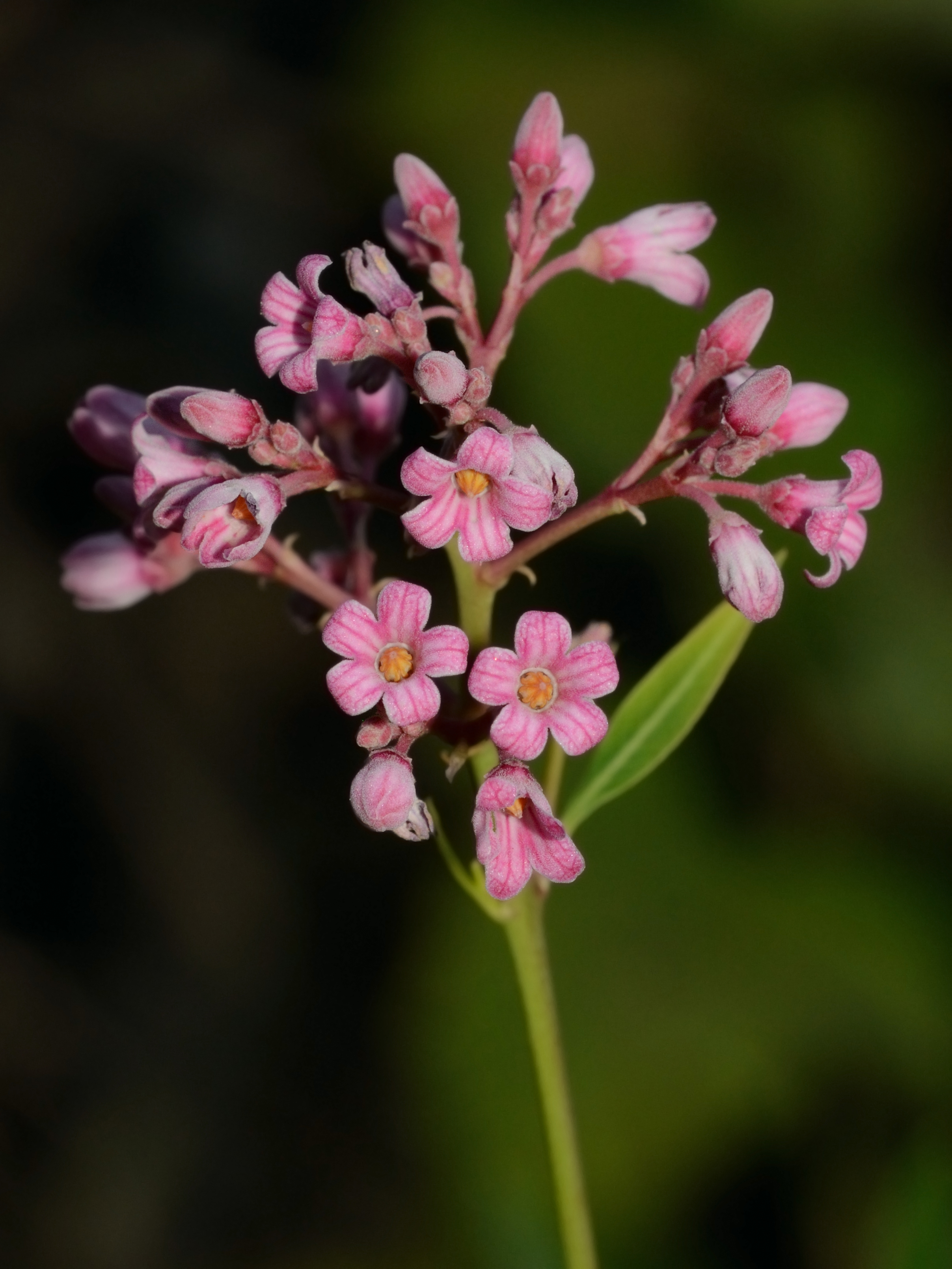

Scientific classification
- Kingdom: Plantae
- Clade: Embryophytes
- Clade: Tracheophytes
- Clade: Angiosperms
- Clade: Eudicots
- Clade: Asterids
- Order: Gentianales
- Family: Apocynaceae
- Genus: Apocynum
- Species: A. venetum

Binomial name
- Apocynum venetum L.

Synonyms
- Trachomitum venetum (L.) Woodson; Apocynum armenum Pobed.; Trachomitum armenum (Pobed.) Pobed.; Apocynum basikurumon H.Hara; Apocynum lancifolium Russanov; Trachomitum lancifolium (Russanov) Pobed.; Nerium antidysentericum Lepech. 1790 not L. 1753 nor Lepech. 1795; Nerium sibiricum Medik.; Apocynum sibiricum Pall. ex Roem. & Schult. 1819 not Jacq. 1770; Apocynum compressum Moench; Trachomitum sarmatiense Woodson; Apocynum sarmatiense (Woodson) O.Wissjul.; Apocynum scabrum Russanov; Trachomitum scabrum (Russanov) Pobed.; Apocynum tauricum Pobed.; Trachomitum tauricum (Pobed.) Pobed.

= Apocynum venetum =

Species of plant

Apocynum venetum, commonly known as sword-leaf dogbane, is a plant species in the dogbane family that is poisonous but used as a source of fiber, medicine, and nectar for production of honey.

== Distribution and habitat ==
Apocynum venetum is considered to be native to a wide range in northern Asia and Southeast Europe: Italy, Bulgaria, Romania, Ex-Yugoslavia, Turkey, Ukraine, Russia, Iraq, Cyprus, Iran, Central Asia, Pakistan, Afghanistan, Siberia, China, and Japan. It grows in swamps, wet places, and maritime sands.

== Uses ==
Apocynum venetum is a valuable bast fibre, compared favorably to silk, ramie, cashmere, and cotton. Apocynum venetum leaves have been used in traditional medicine for the treatment of hypertension.

== Subspecies ==
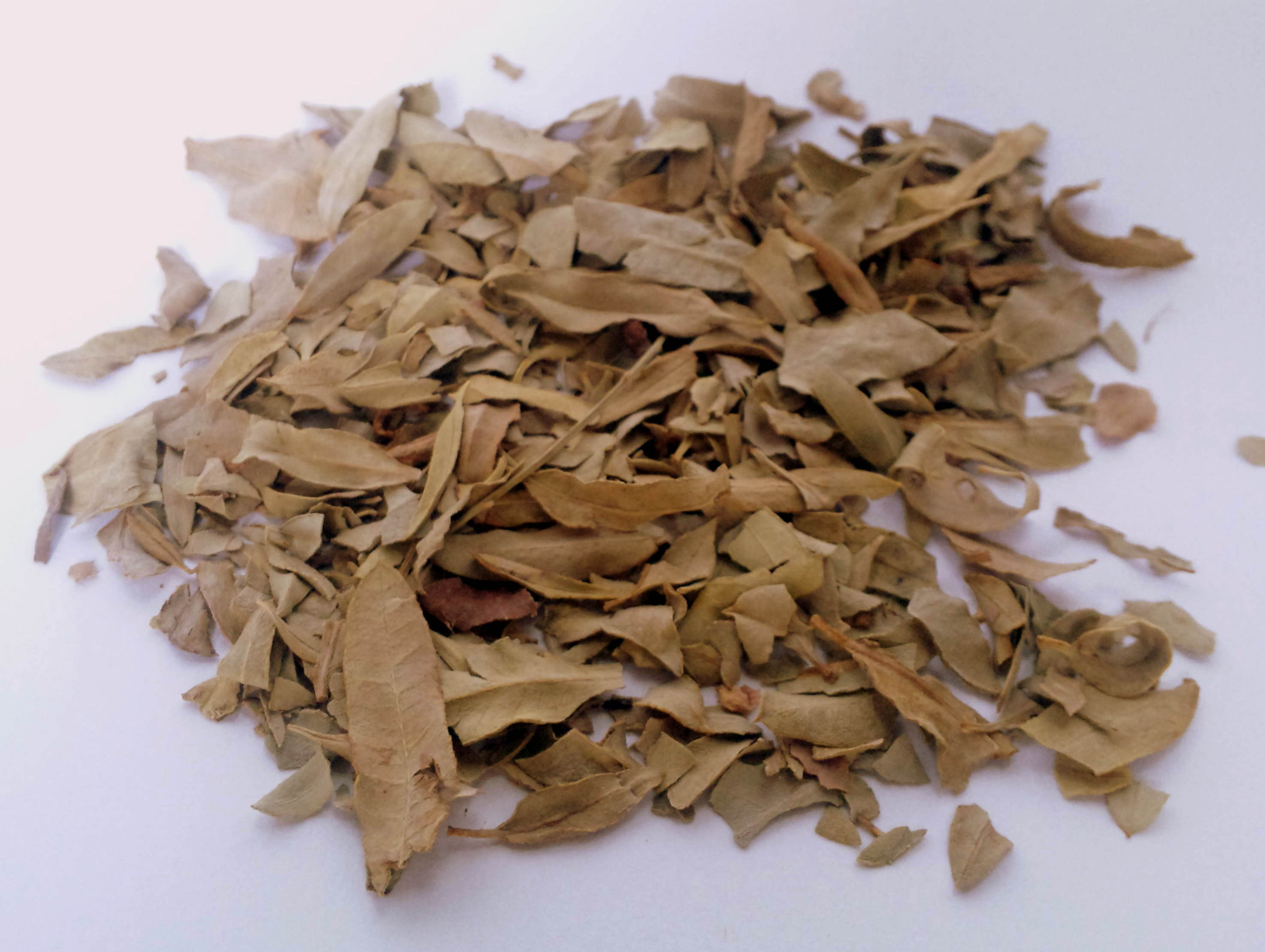
Dried Apocynum venetum tea leaves ("Luobuma")

Subspecies include:

1. Apocynum venetum subsp. armenum (Pobed.) ined. – Turkey, Iran, Caucasus
2. Apocynum venetum subsp. basikurumon (H.Hara) ined. – Japan
3. Apocynum venetum subsp. lancifolium (Russanov) ined. – Siberia, China (including Tibet + Xinjiang), Mongolia, Kazakhstan, Kyrgyzstan, Uzbekistan
4. Apocynum venetum subsp. russanovii (Pobed.) ined. – Ostriv Dzharylhach Peninsula in Ukraine
5. Apocynum venetum subsp. sarmatiense (Woodson) ined. – Bulgaria, Russia, Ukraine, Turkey, Iran, Iraq, Caucasus
6. Apocynum venetum subsp. scabrum (Russanov) ined. – Kazakhstan, Turkmenistan, Tajikistan, Afghanistan, Iran, Pakistan
7. Apocynum venetum subsp. tauricum (Pobed.) ined. – Cape St. Ilya in Crimea
8. Apocynum venetum subsp. venetum – Italy
