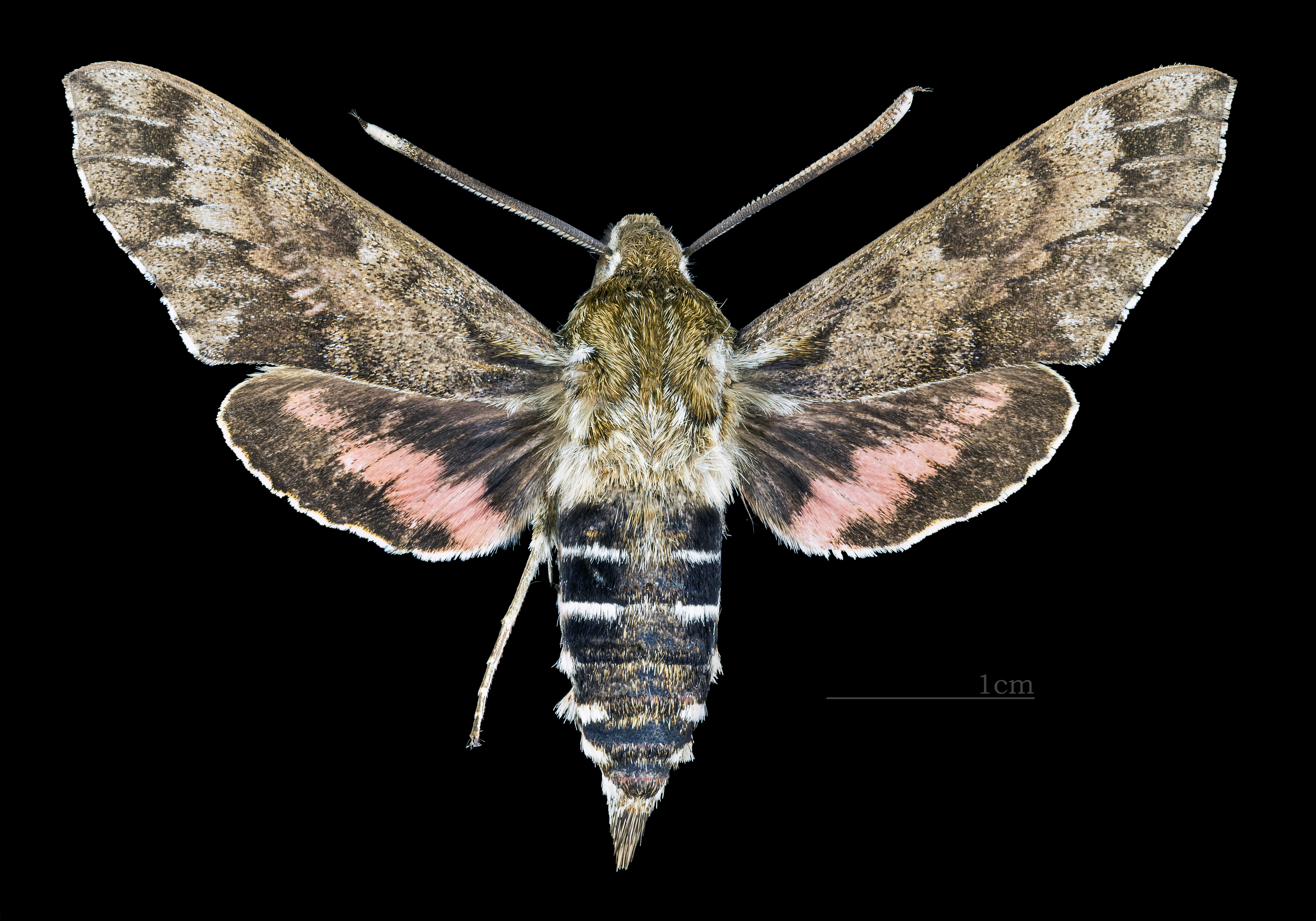
- Dorsal view
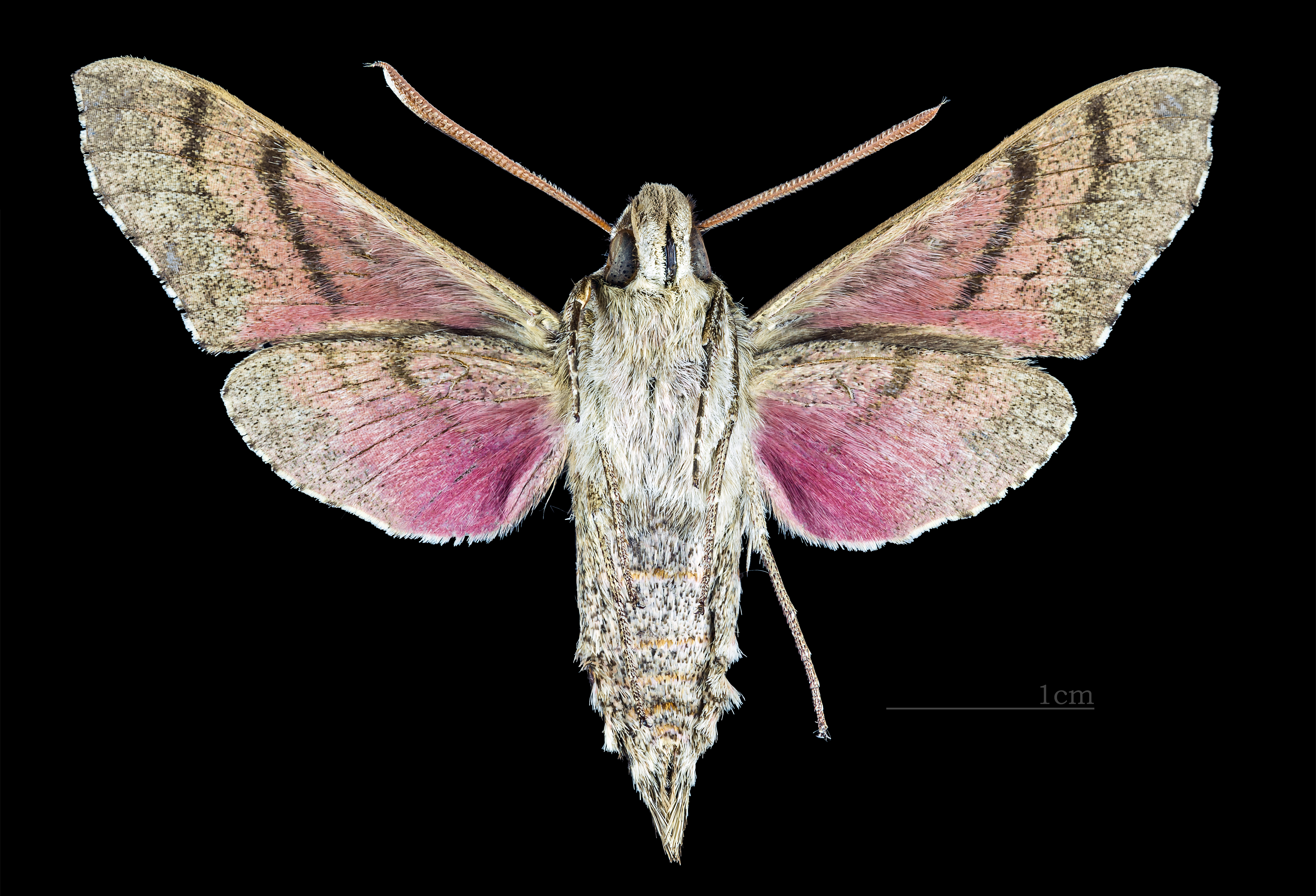
- Ventral view

Scientific classification
- Kingdom: Animalia
- Phylum: Arthropoda
- Class: Insecta
- Order: Lepidoptera
- Family: Sphingidae
- Genus: Hyles
- Species: H. perkinsi

Binomial name
- Hyles perkinsi (Swezey, 1920)

Synonyms
- Celerio perkinsi Swezey, 1920; Hawaiina perkinsi; Hyles wilsoni perkinsi

= Hyles perkinsi =

Perkin's sphinx

Species of moth

Hyles perkinsi, or Perkins' Sphinx Moth, is a species of moth of the family Sphingidae. It was described by Otto Herman Swezey in 1920. It is endemic to the Hawaiian islands of Oahu and Molokai.

Larvae have been recorded on Euphorbia, Kadua, Straussia kaduana and other Straussia species.

== Taxonomy ==
Ian J. Kitching and Jean-Marie Cadiou have elevated it to full species status. It was formerly a subspecies of Hyles wilsoni.
