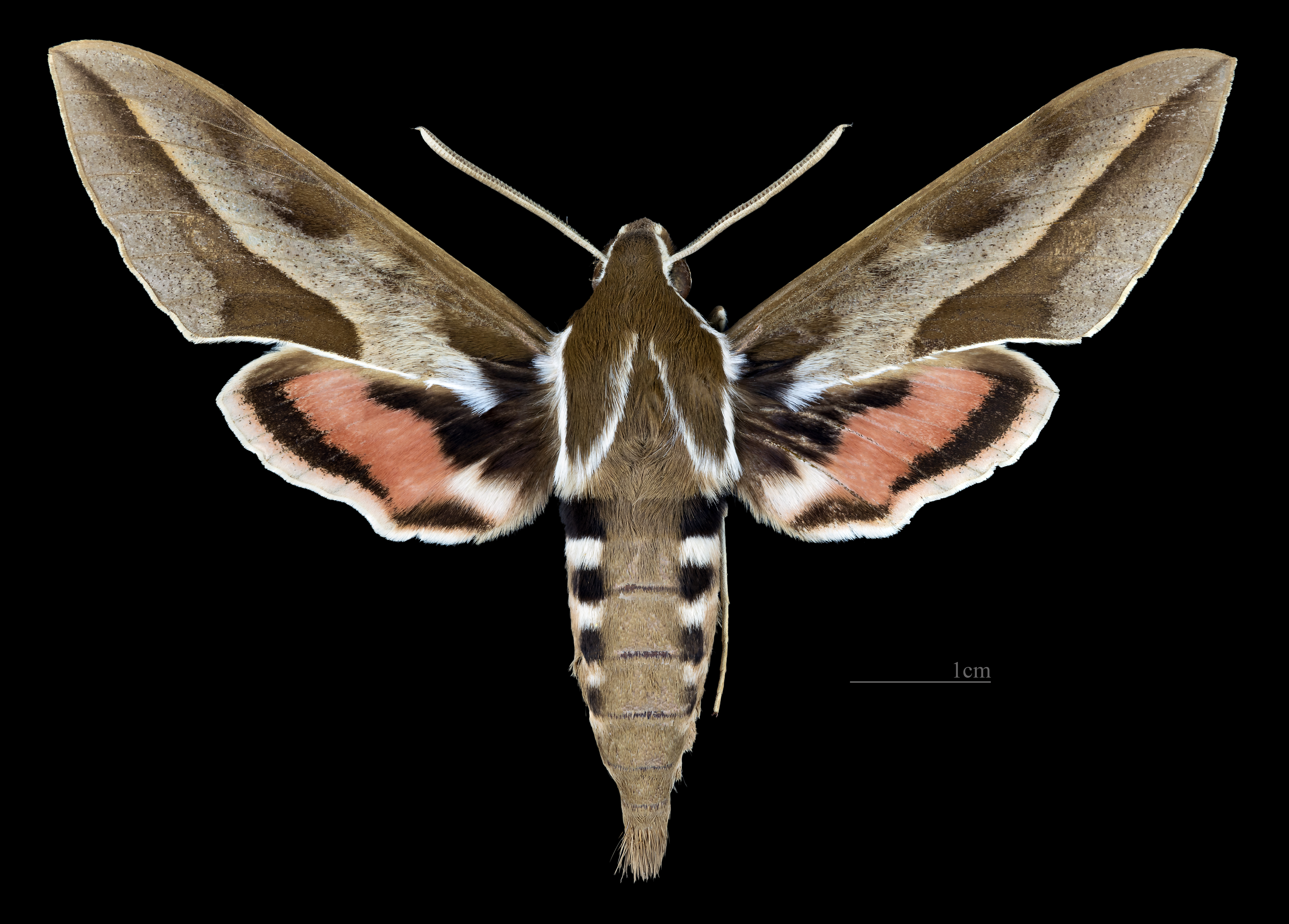
- Male dorsal
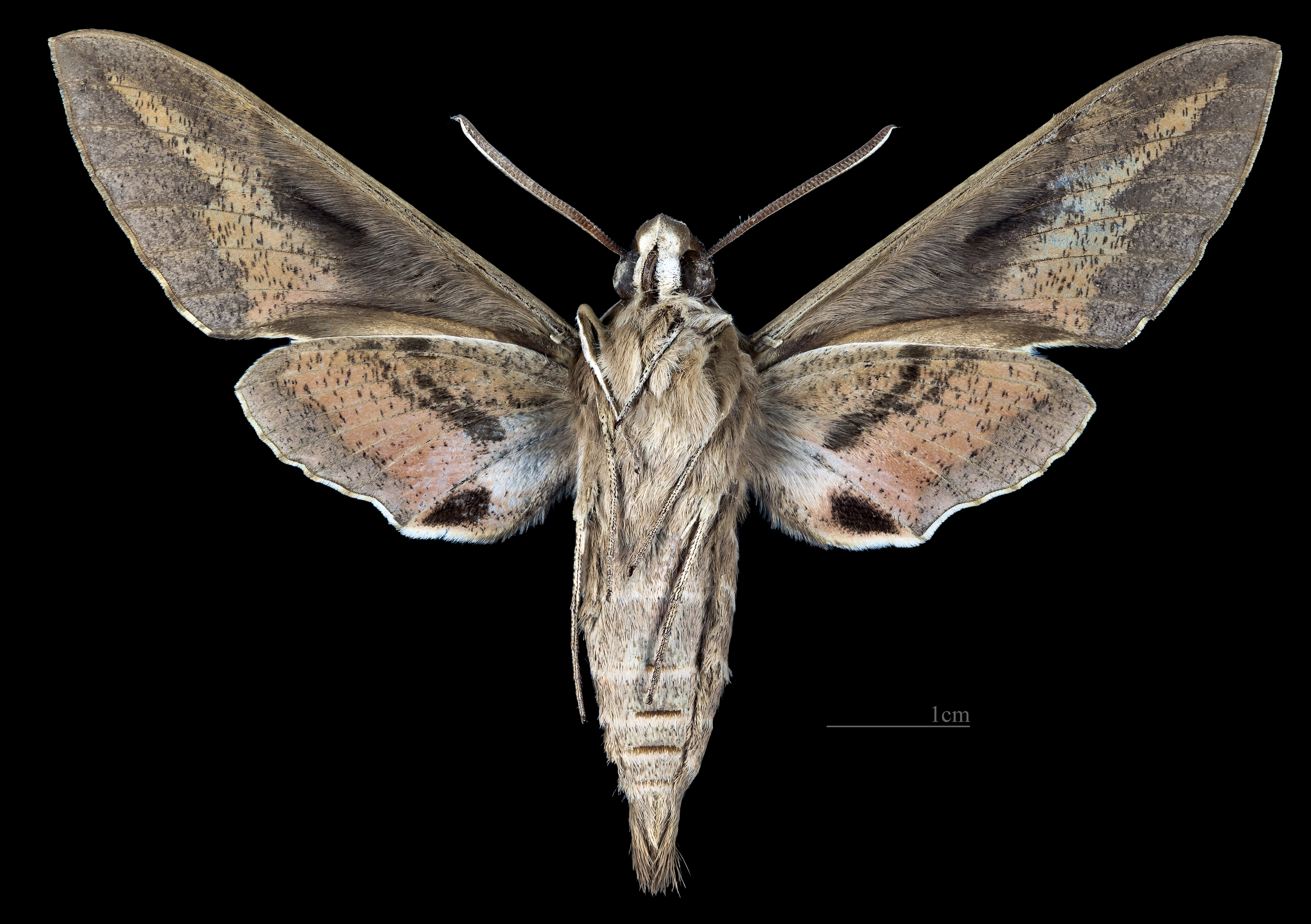
- Male ventral

Scientific classification
- Kingdom: Animalia
- Phylum: Arthropoda
- Class: Insecta
- Order: Lepidoptera
- Family: Sphingidae
- Genus: Hyles
- Species: H. annei

Binomial name
- Hyles annei (Guerin-Meneville, 1839)

Synonyms
- Sphinx annei Guérin-Méneville, 1839

= Hyles annei =

Species of moth

Hyles annei is a moth of the family Sphingidae.

== Distribution ==
It is known from Chile, Bolivia, western Peru and Argentina.

== Description ==
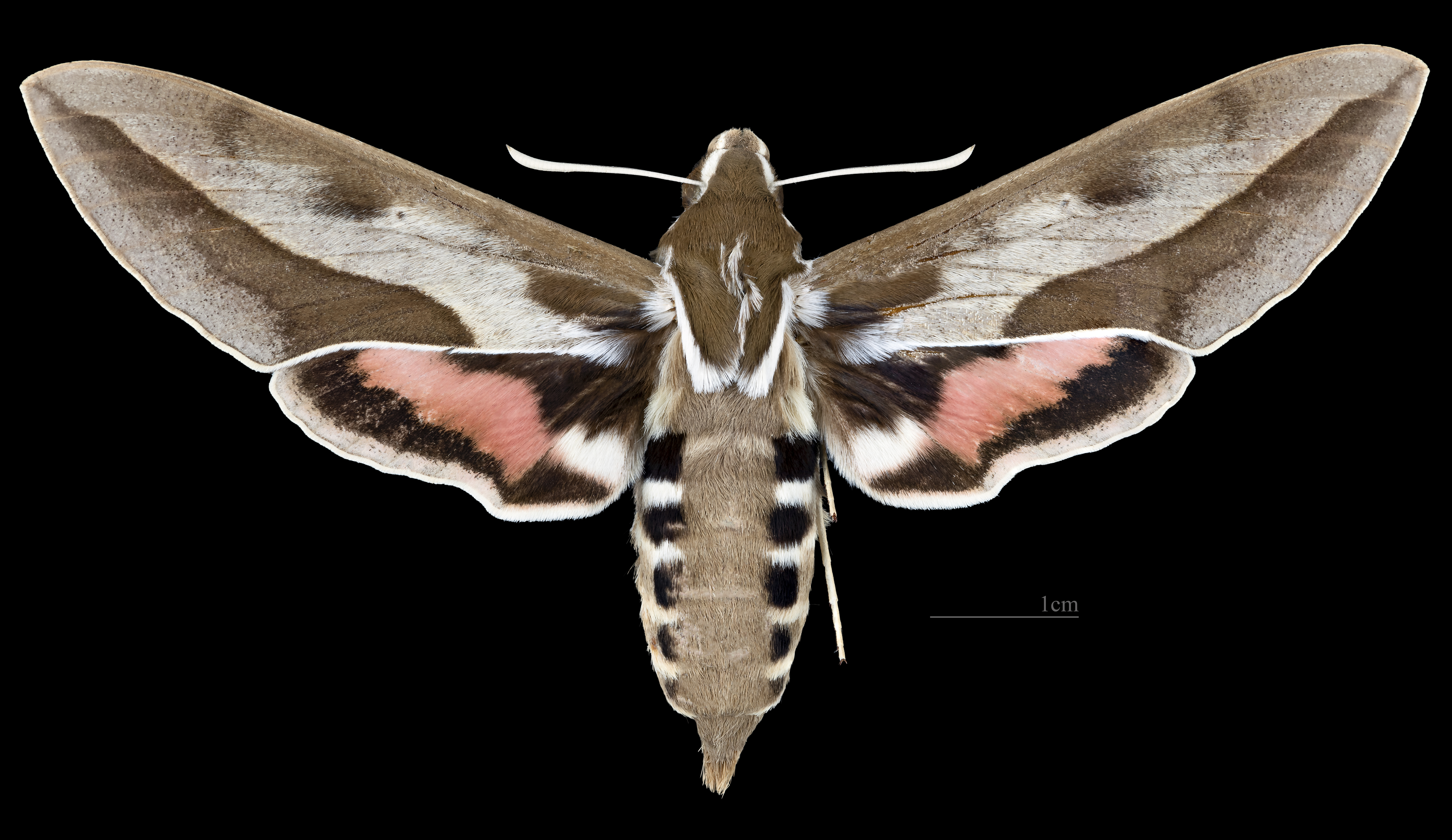
Hyles annei ♀

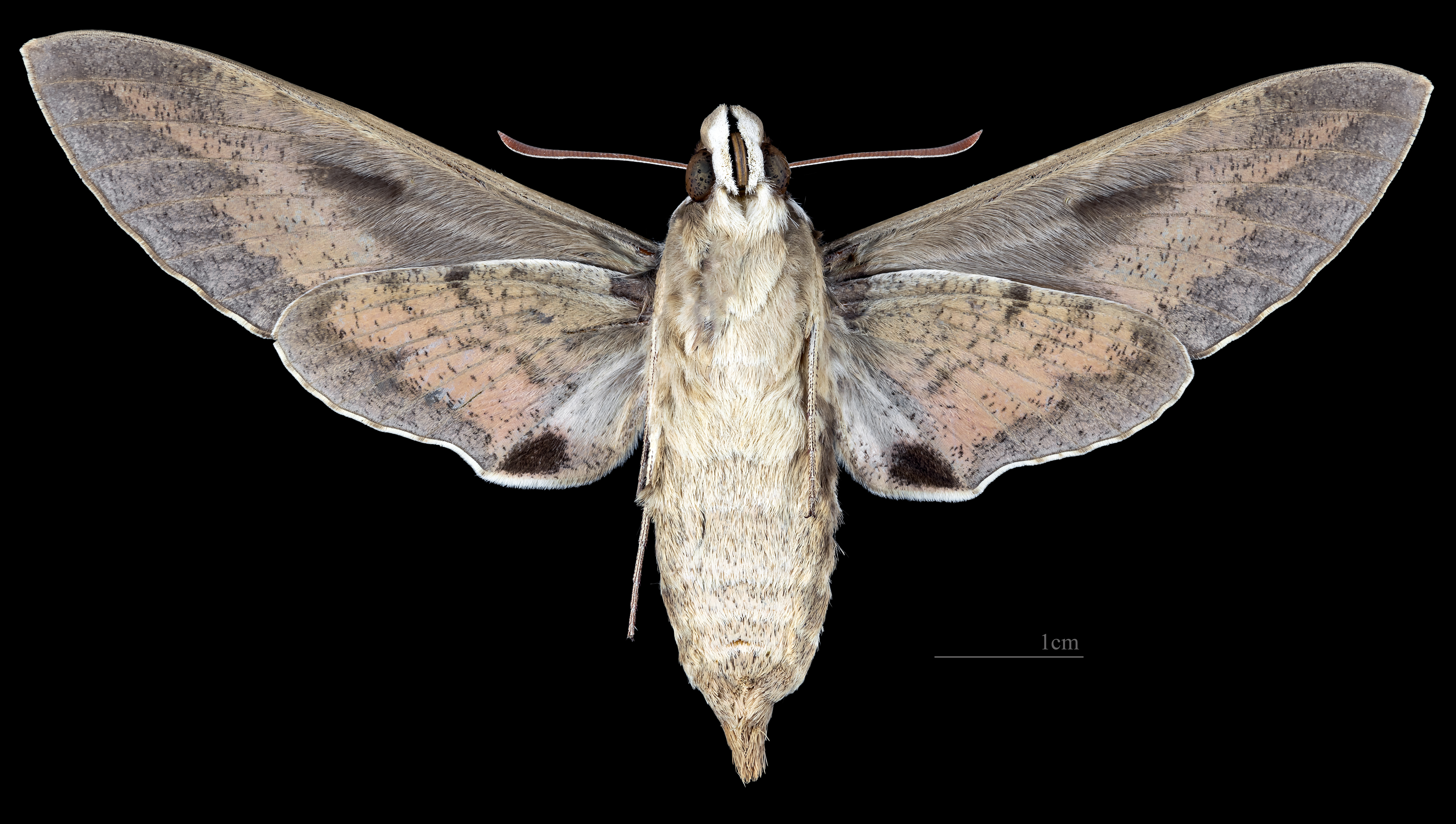
Hyles annei ♀ △

== Biology ==
Adults are on wing in January, August and probably other months.

The larval hosts are unknown, but they will probably feed on a wide range of plants including Epilobium, Mirabilis, Oenothera, Vitis, Lycopersicon, Portulaca, Fuchsia, Gaura lindheimerii, Alternanthera pungens and Euphorbia dentata or related plants found in a dry climate.
