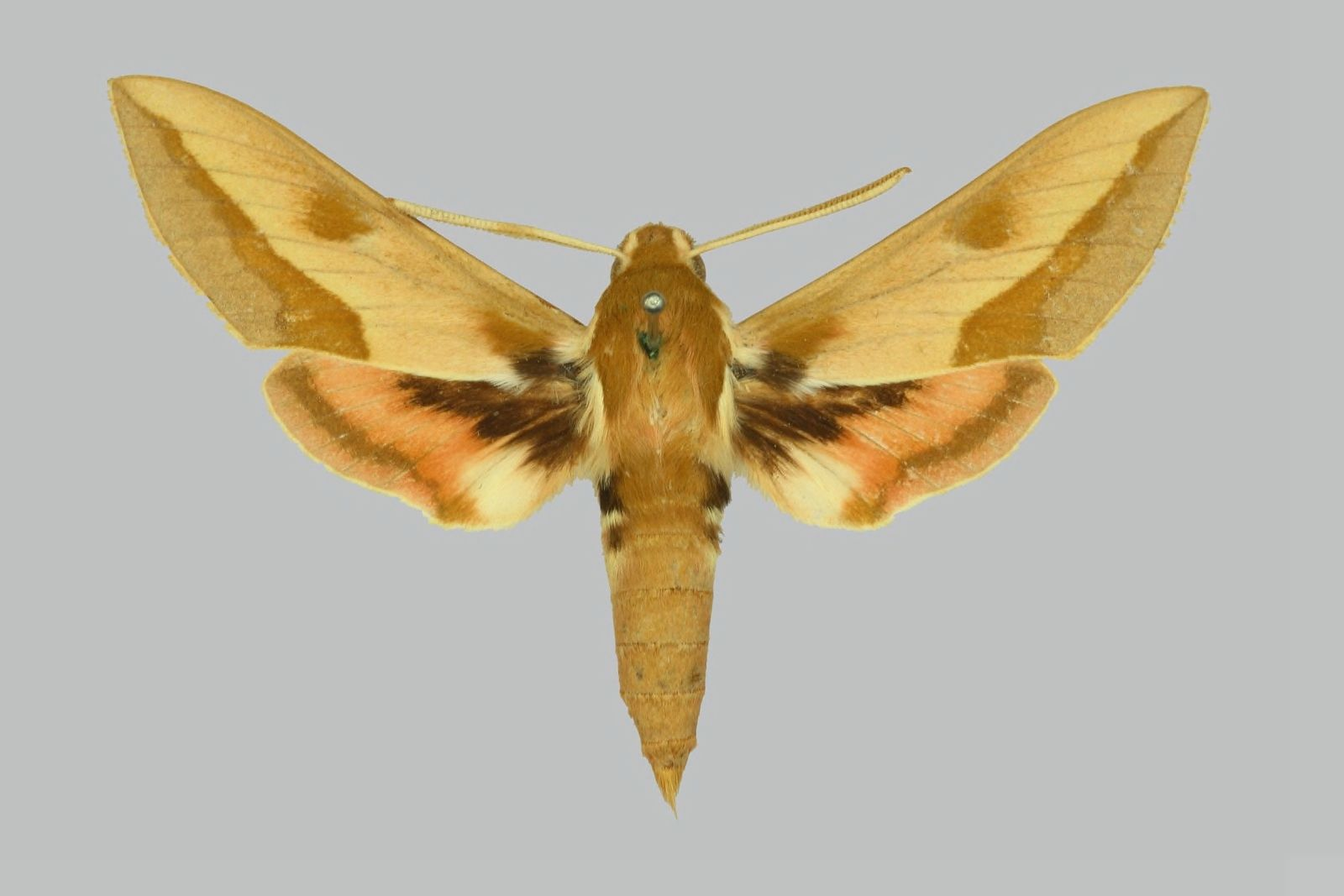
- Male

Scientific classification
- Kingdom: Animalia
- Phylum: Arthropoda
- Class: Insecta
- Order: Lepidoptera
- Family: Sphingidae
- Genus: Hyles
- Species: H. centralasiae

Binomial name
- Hyles centralasiae (Staudinger, 1887)

Synonyms
- Deilephila centralasiae Staudinger, 1887; Celerio centralasiae transcaspica O. Bang-Haas, 1936

= Hyles centralasiae =

Species of moth

Hyles centralasiae, the eastern foxtail-lily hawkmoth, is a moth of the family Sphingidae. The species was first described by Otto Staudinger in 1887.

== Distribution ==
It is found from eastern Turkey and Armenia east across northern Iraq, northern Iran, southern Turkmenistan, the mountainous areas of eastern Uzbekistan and southern Kazakhstan to Tajikistan, Kyrgyzstan, Afghanistan and northern Xinjiang in China.

== Description ==
The wingspan is 60–75 mm.
