= Hyles salangensis =

Salang hawkmoth

Scientific classification
- Kingdom: Animalia
- Phylum: Arthropoda
- Class: Insecta
- Order: Lepidoptera
- Family: Sphingidae
- Genus: Hyles
- Species: H. salangensis

Binomial name
- Hyles salangensis (Ebert, 1969)

Synonyms
- Celerio salangensis Ebert, 1969

Species of moth

Hyles salangensis, the Salang hawkmoth, is a moth of the family Sphingidae. The species was first described by G. Ebert in 1969. It is only known from the Salang Pass and surrounding mountains in Afghanistan.

The wingspan is 55–70 mm. Adults are on wing in early July.
