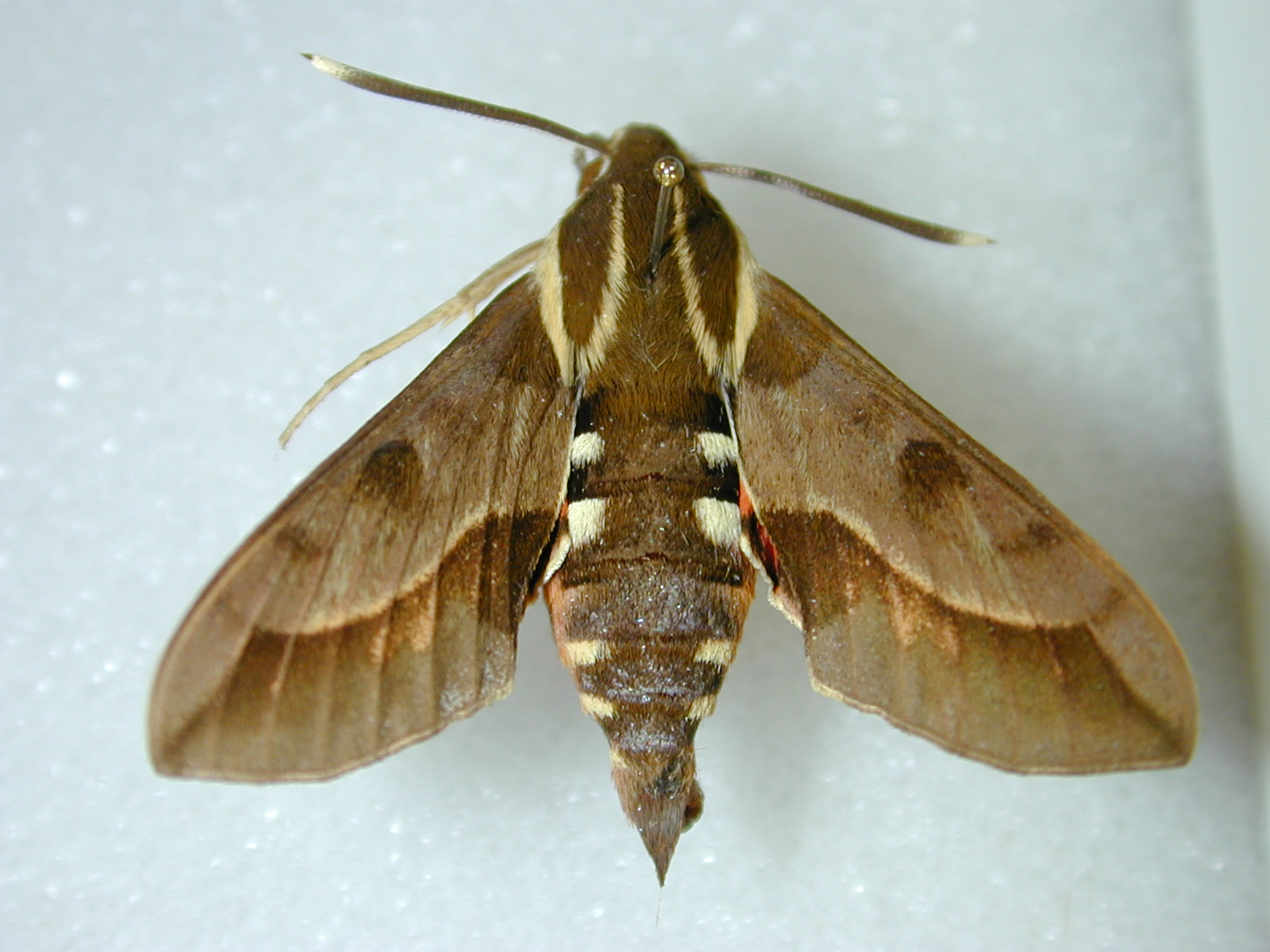

Scientific classification
- Kingdom: Animalia
- Phylum: Arthropoda
- Clade: Pancrustacea
- Class: Insecta
- Order: Lepidoptera
- Family: Sphingidae
- Genus: Hyles
- Species: H. calida

Binomial name
- Hyles calida (Butler, 1881)

Synonyms
- Deilephila calida Butler, 1881; Celerio calida; Hawaiina calida; Celerio calida hawaiiensis Rothschild & Jordan, 1915

= Hyles calida =

Hawaiian sphinx

Species of moth

Hyles calida, the Hawaiian sphinx, is a moth of the family Sphingidae. The species was first described by Arthur Gardiner Butler in 1881. It is endemic to Kauai, Oahu, Molokai and Hawaii.

The larvae feed on Bobea elatior, Coprosma, Gardenia, and Psychotria. Adults feed on flowers of Lantana, Metrosideros and others.

== Description ==
Larvae are about 60 mm long.

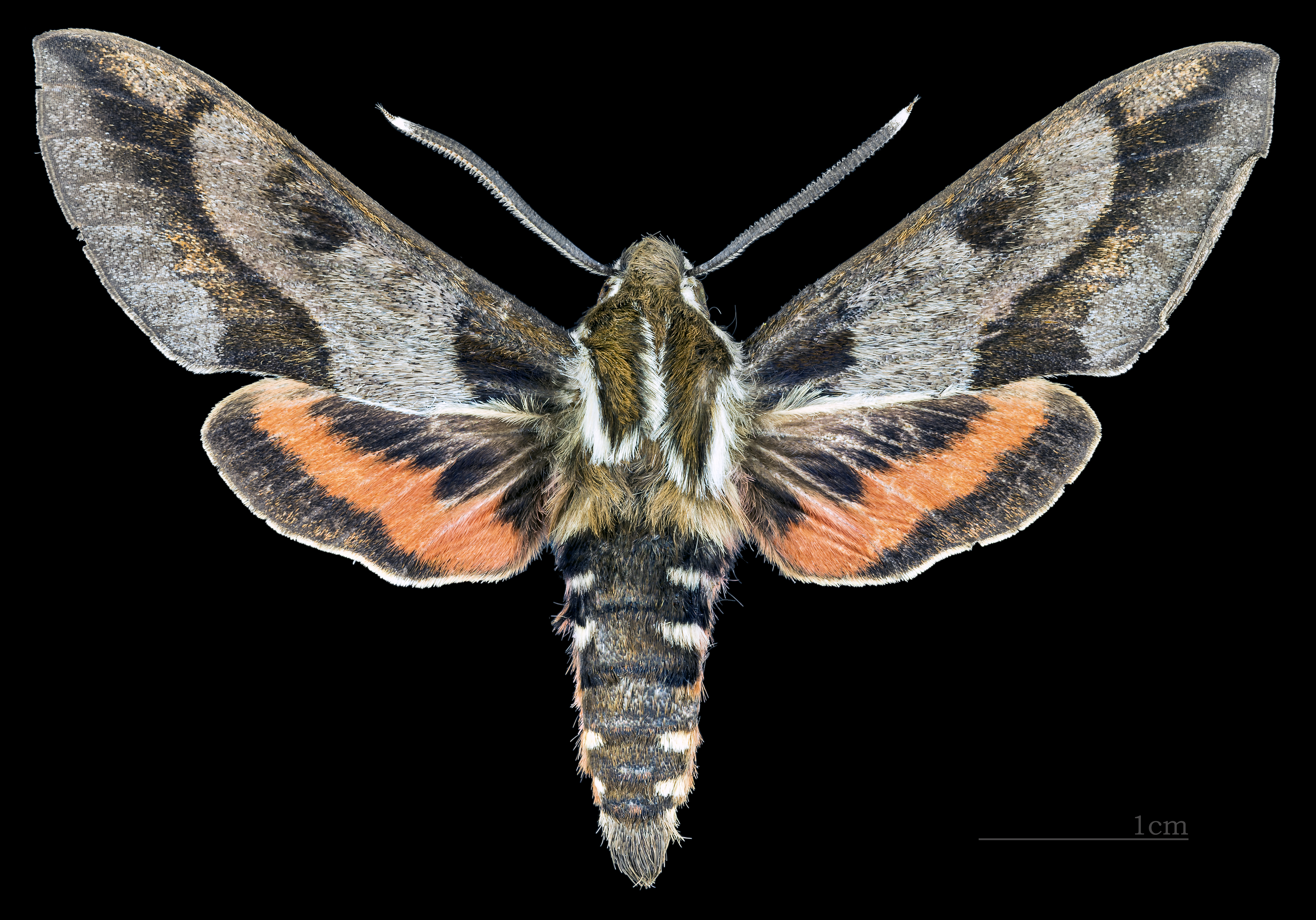
Male dorsal view

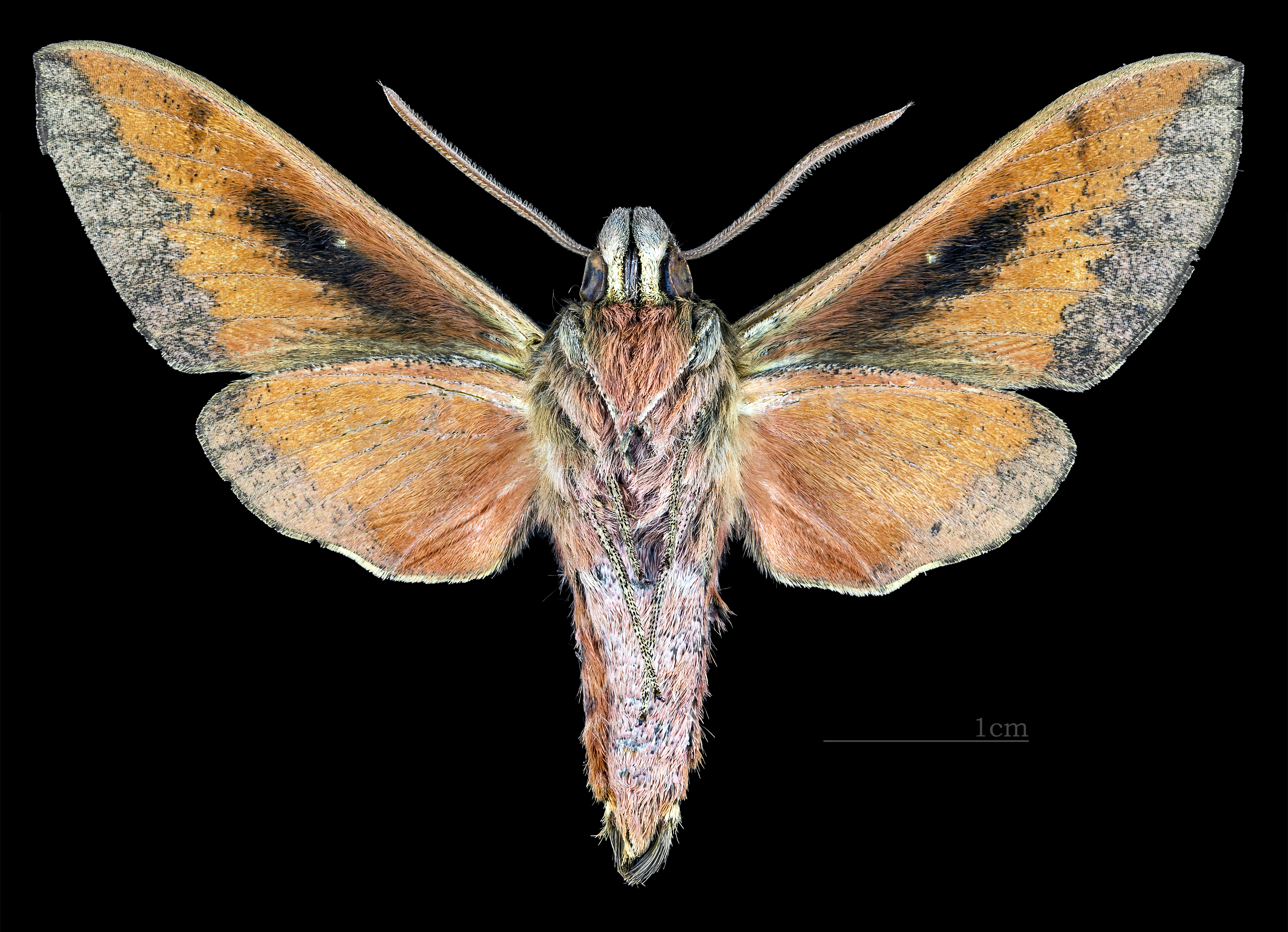
Male ventral view

== Subspecies ==
- Hyles calida calida (Kauai, Oahu and Molokai)
- Hyles calida calida hawaiiensis Rothschild and Jordan, 1915 (Hawaii)
