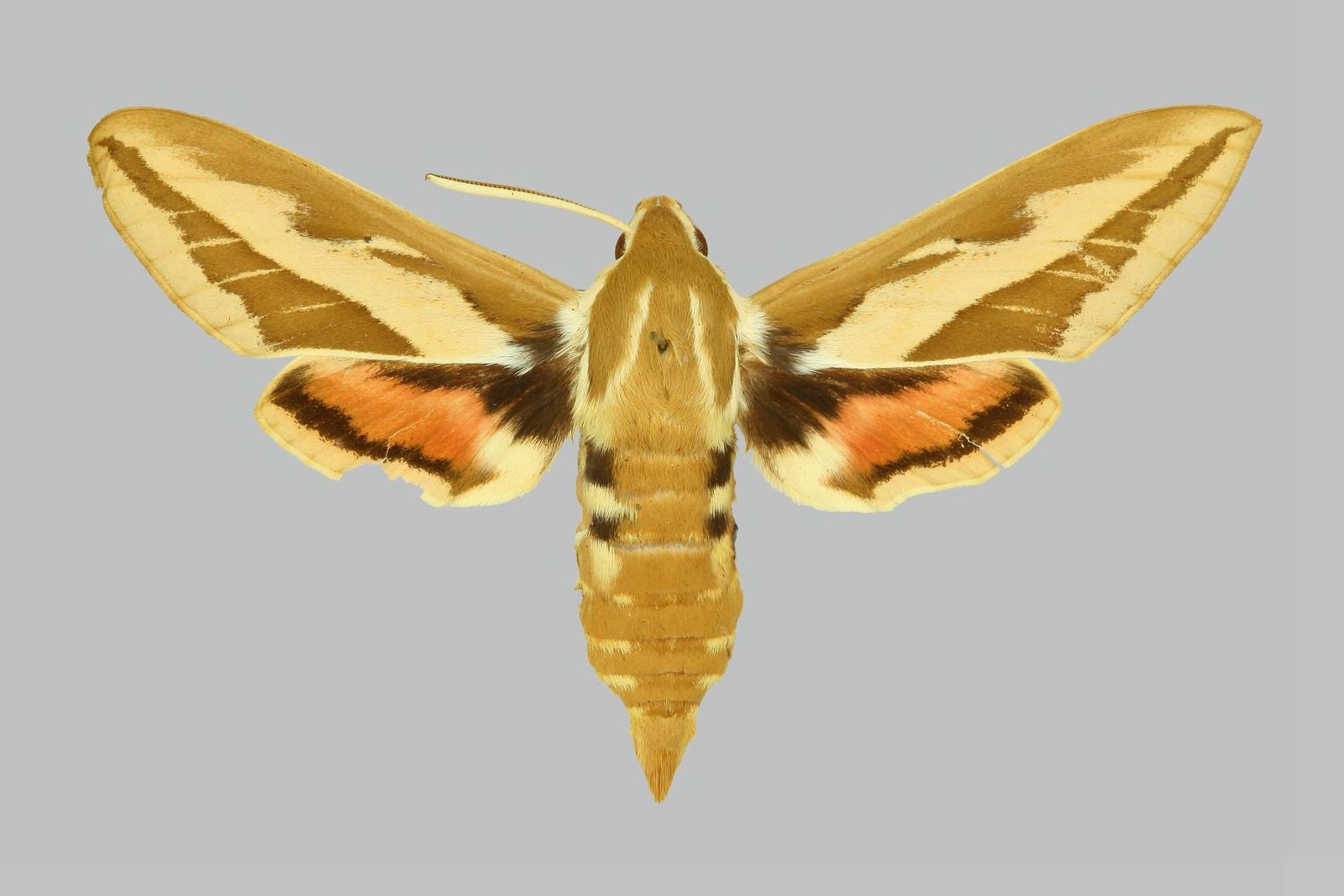
- Hyles exilis, male, upperside.

Scientific classification
- Kingdom: Animalia
- Phylum: Arthropoda
- Class: Insecta
- Order: Lepidoptera
- Family: Sphingidae
- Genus: Hyles
- Species: H. chuvilini

Binomial name
- Hyles chuvilini Eitschberger, Danner & Surholt, 1998

= Hyles chuvilini =

Species of moth

Hyles chuvilini is a moth of the family Sphingidae. It is known from Mongolia, north-eastern China and adjacent areas of Russia and also further south in China, in Shaanxi and Shandong. This species is probably much more widely distributed in northern China.

There are two generations in northern China, with adults on wing from June to September.
