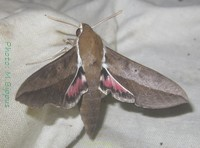

Scientific classification
- Kingdom: Animalia
- Phylum: Arthropoda
- Clade: Pancrustacea
- Class: Insecta
- Order: Lepidoptera
- Family: Sphingidae
- Genus: Hyles
- Species: H. biguttata

Binomial name
- Hyles biguttata (Walker, 1856)

Synonyms
- Deilephila biguttata Walker, 1856; Celerio biguttata; Deilephila eleagni Boisduval, 1875; Deilephila euphorbioides Swinhoe, 1892

= Hyles biguttata =

Species of moth

Hyles biguttata is a moth of the family Sphingidae. It is known to be from Madagascar and Réunion.

The larvae feed on Agarista salicifolia and Agarista buxifolia.
