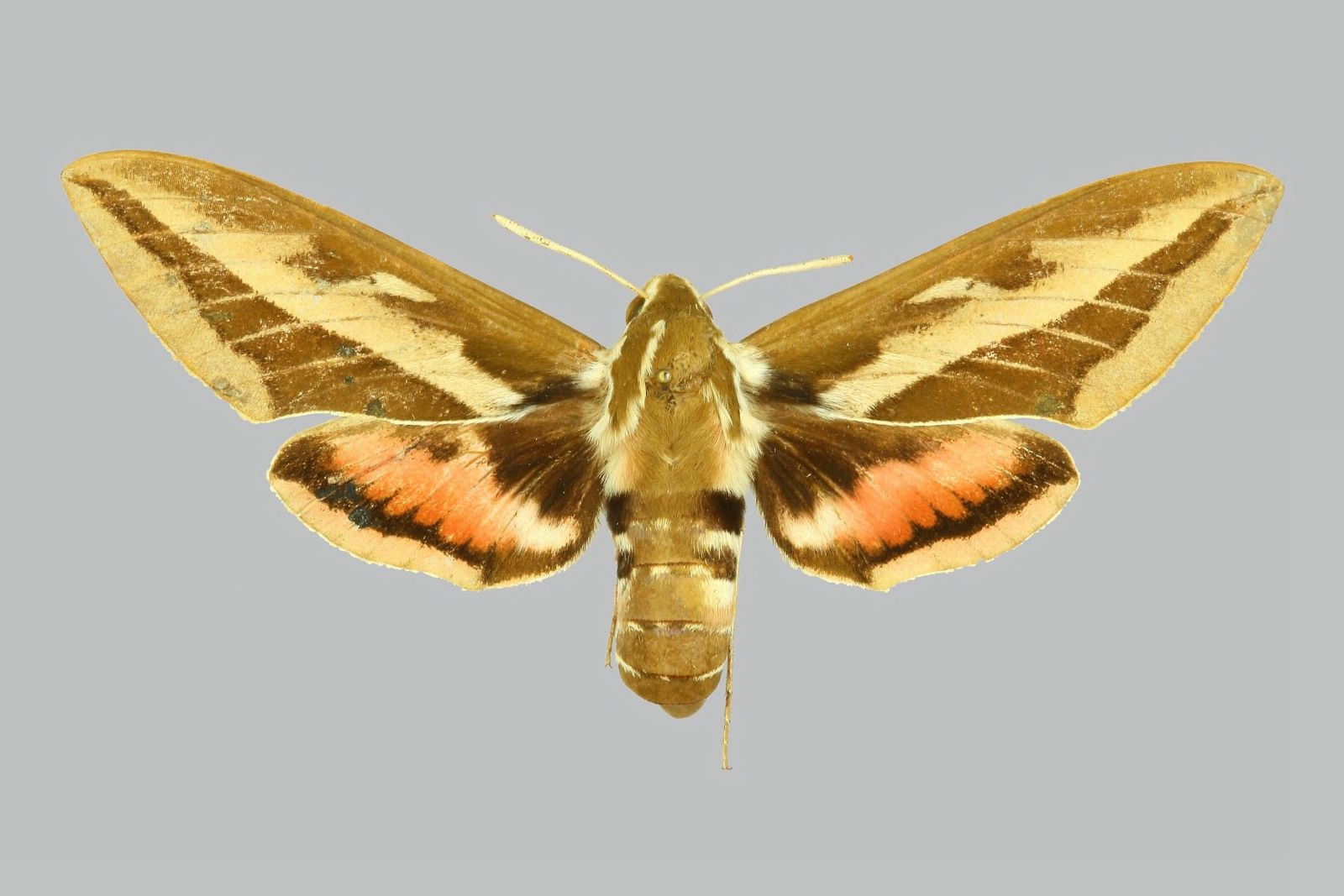

Scientific classification
- Kingdom: Animalia
- Phylum: Arthropoda
- Class: Insecta
- Order: Lepidoptera
- Family: Sphingidae
- Genus: Hyles
- Species: H. costata

Binomial name
- Hyles costata (von Nordmann, 1851)

Synonyms
- Sphinx costata von Nordmann, 1851; Hyles costata solida Derzhavets, 1979; Hyles costata exilis Derzhavets, 1979; Celerio costata confusa (Gehlen, 1928)

= Hyles costata =

Species of moth

Hyles costata is a species of moth in the family Sphingidae. It is known from Mongolia and adjacent areas of Russia. There are also records from further east and south in China (Heilongjiang and Gansu). It is probably much more widely distributed in northern China.

The wingspan is 70–82 mm. In China, adults are on wing in July. In Mongolia and Russia, they are on wing from June to August.

The larvae feed on Koenigia (syn. Aconopogon), Polygonum and Rumex species.
