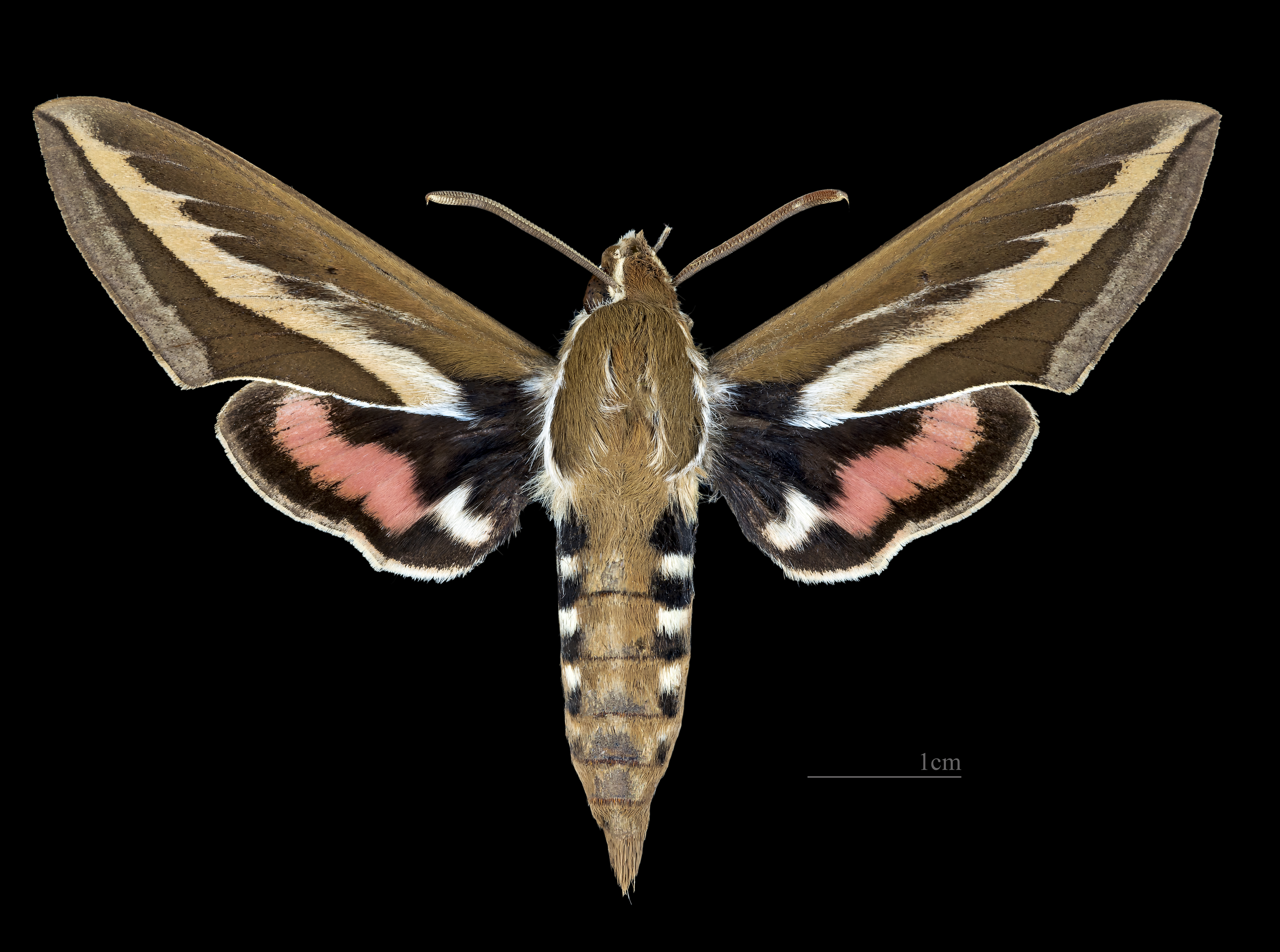
- male dorsal
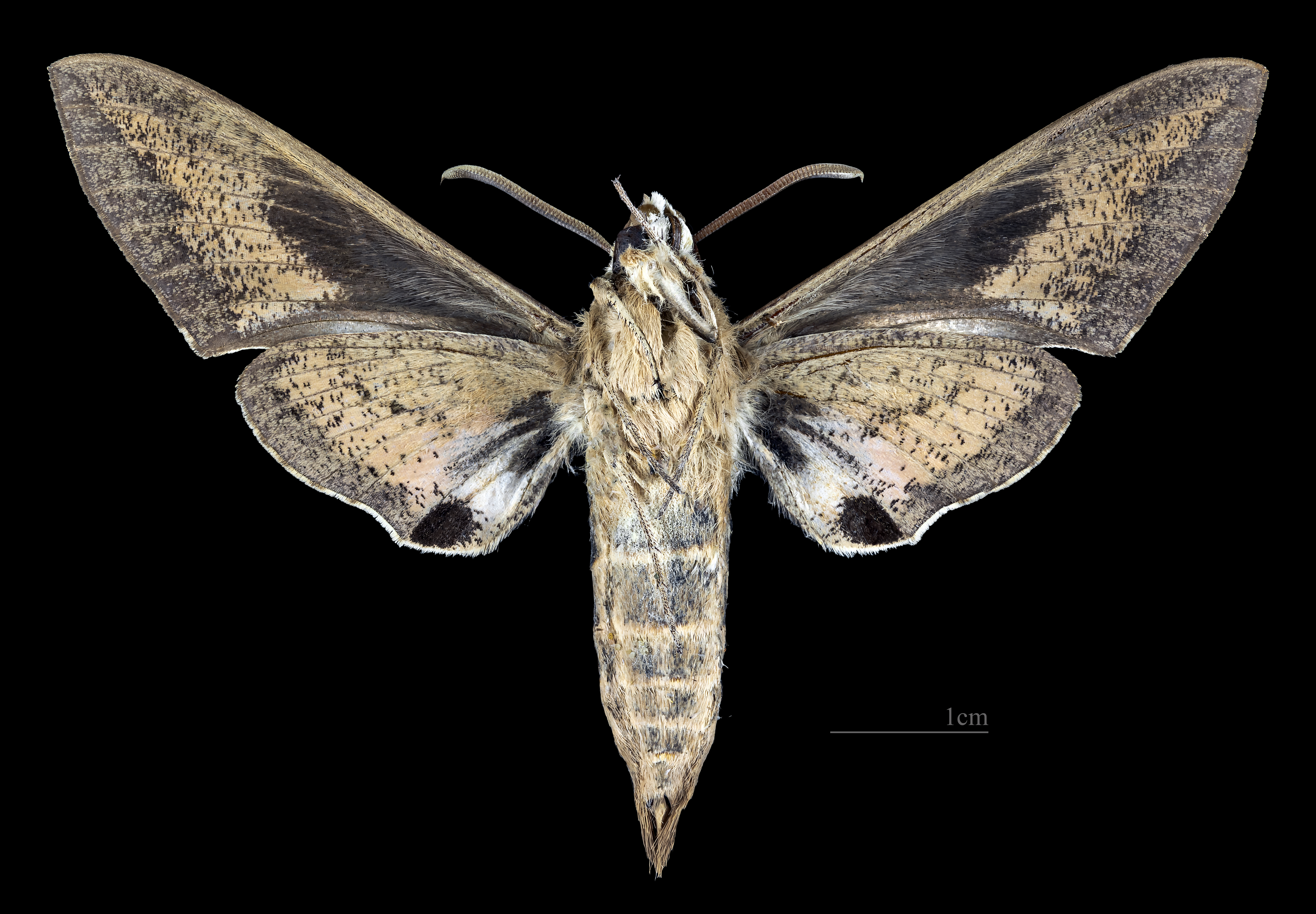
- male ventral

Scientific classification
- Kingdom: Animalia
- Phylum: Arthropoda
- Class: Insecta
- Order: Lepidoptera
- Family: Sphingidae
- Genus: Hyles
- Species: H. euphorbiarum

Binomial name
- Hyles euphorbiarum (Guerin-Meneville & Percheron, 1835)

Synonyms
- Sphinx euphorbiarum Guérin-Méneville & Percheron, 1835; Deilephila celeno Boisduval, 1875; Deilephila spinifascia Butler, 1881

= Hyles euphorbiarum =

Species of moth

Hyles euphorbiarum is a moth of the family Sphingidae.

== Distribution ==
It is known from Chile, Argentina, the Falklands, Uruguay, Paraguay and southern Brazil.

== Description ==
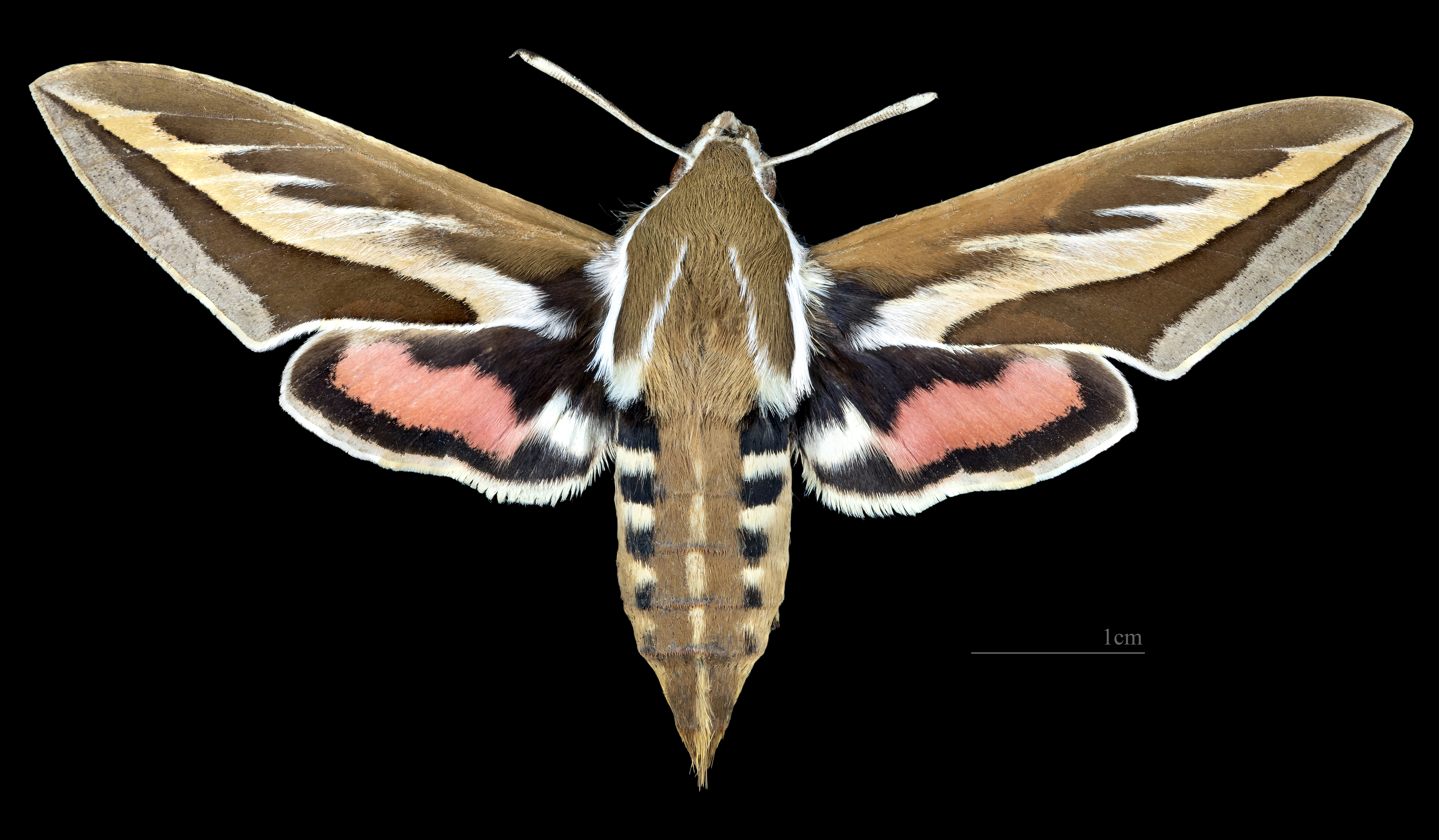
Female dorsal

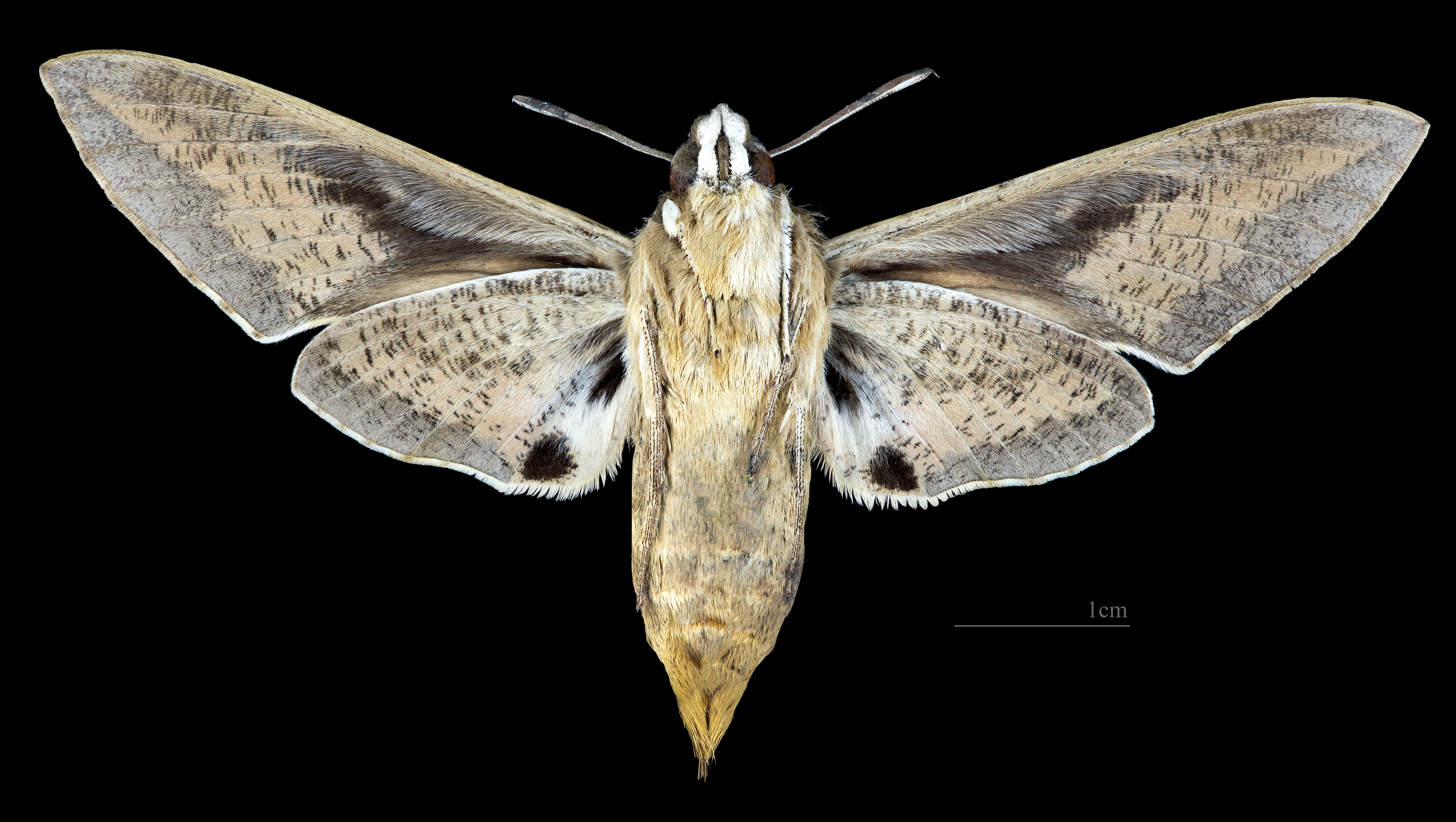
Female ventral

== Biology ==
Adults have been recorded in March, July, September and November, but are probably on wing throughout the year.

The larvae feed on Fabaceae, Nyctaginaceae, Onagraceae, Polygonaceae, Portulacaceae, Solanaceae and possibly Euphorbiaceae species.
