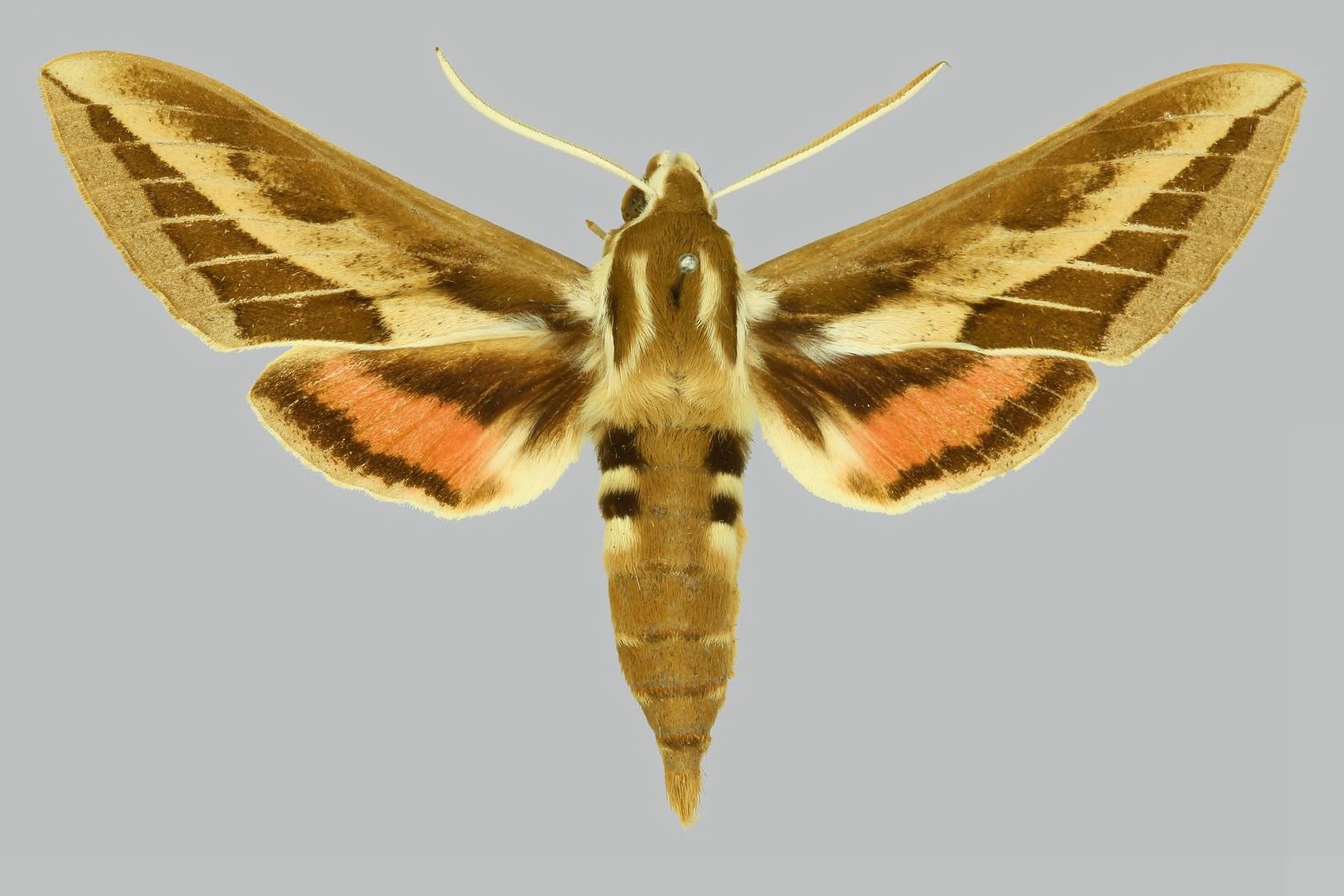
- Male

Scientific classification
- Kingdom: Animalia
- Phylum: Arthropoda
- Class: Insecta
- Order: Lepidoptera
- Family: Sphingidae
- Genus: Hyles
- Species: H. nervosa

Binomial name
- Hyles nervosa (Rothschild & Jordan, 1903)

Synonyms
- Celerio nervosa Rothschild & Jordan, 1903; Celerio euphorbiae nervosa Rothschild & Jordan, 1903

= Hyles nervosa =

Ladakh hawkmoth

Species of moth

Hyles nervosa, the Ladakh hawkmoth, is a moth of the family Sphingidae. The species was first described by Walter Rothschild and Karl Jordan in 1903. It is found in eastern Afghanistan, northern and western India, northern Pakistan and the extreme west of the Tibet.

The wingspan is 68–87 mm. Adults are on wing from March to May, June to July and in September. There are three generations per year.

The larvae feed on herbaceous Euphorbia species.
