= Hyles churkini =

Scientific classification
- Domain: Eukaryota
- Kingdom: Animalia
- Phylum: Arthropoda
- Class: Insecta
- Order: Lepidoptera
- Family: Sphingidae
- Genus: Hyles
- Species: H. churkini

Binomial name
- Hyles churkini Saldaitis & Ivinskis, 2006

Species of moth

Hyles churkini is a moth of the family Sphingidae which is endemic to Mongolia.
