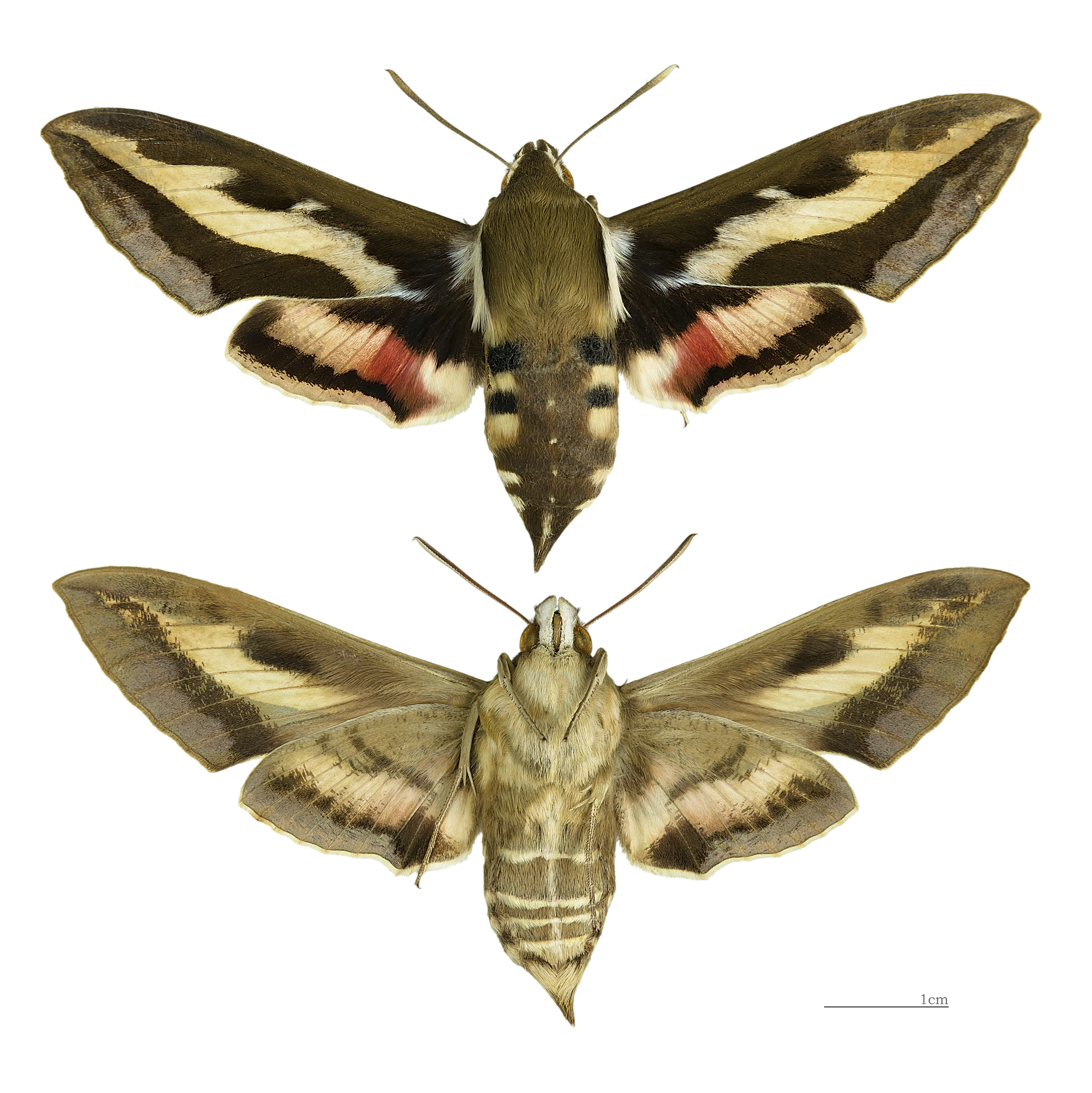
- Hyles gallii - MHNT
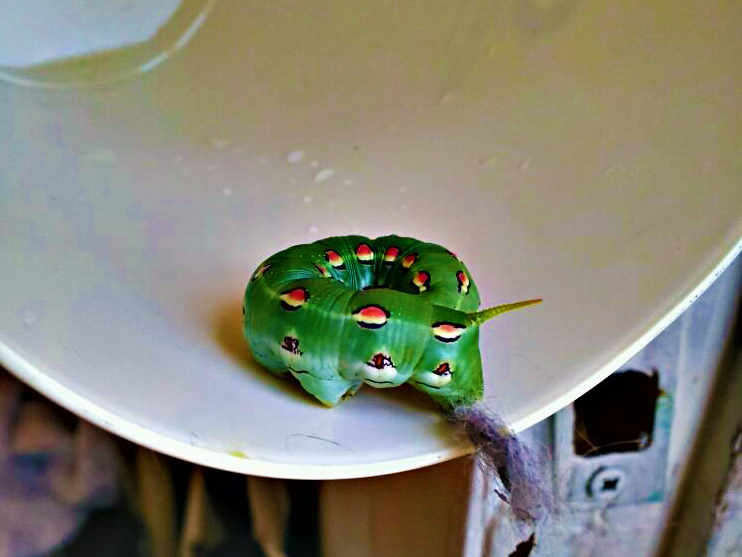
- The larvae of this species are considered hornworms, in this case a hummingbird moth caterpillar, Hyles lineata

Scientific classification
- Domain: Eukaryota
- Kingdom: Animalia
- Phylum: Arthropoda
- Class: Insecta
- Order: Lepidoptera
- Family: Sphingidae
- Subfamily: Macroglossinae
- Tribe: Macroglossini
- Subtribe: Choerocampina
- Genus: Hyles; Hübner, 1819

Species
- See text

Synonyms
- Celerio Agassiz, 1846; Celerio Oken, 1815; Danneria Eitschberger & Zolotuhin, 1998; Eremohyles Eitschberger & Zolotuhin, 1998; Hawaiina Tutt, 1903; Hippohyles Eitschberger & Zolotuhin, 1998; Rommeliana Eitschberger & Zolotuhin, 1998; Surholtia Eitschberger & Zolotuhin, 1998; Thaumas Hübner, 1819; Turneria Tutt, 1903; Weismannia Tutt, 1904

= Hyles (moth) =

Genus of moths

Hyles is a genus of moths in the family Sphingidae.

== Species ==
- H. annei (Guerin-Meneville, 1839)
- H. apocyni (Shchetkin, 1956)
- H. biguttata (Walker, 1856)
- H. calida (Butler, 1856)
- H. centralasiae (Staudinger, 1887)
- H. chamyla (Denso, 1913)
- H. churkini Saldaitis & Ivinskis, 2006
- H. chuvilini Eitschberger, Danner & Surholt, 1998
- H. costata (von Nordmann, 1851)
- H. cretica Eitschberger, Danner & Surholt, 1998
- H. dahlii (Geyer, 1828)
- H. euphorbiae (Linnaeus, 1758)
- H. euphorbiarum (Guerin-Meneville & Percheron, 1835)
- H. gallii (Rottemburg, 1775)
- H. hippophaes (Esper, 1789)
- H. lineata (Fabricius, 1775)
- H. livornica (Esper, 1780)
- H. livornicoides (Lucas, 1892)
- H. malgassica (Denso, 1944)
- H. nervosa Rothschild & Jordan, 1903
- H. nicaea (von Prunner, 1798)
- H. perkinsi (Swezey, 1920)
- H. renneri Eitschberger, Danner & Surholt, 1998
- H. robertsi (Butler, 1880)
- H. salangensis (Ebert, 1969)
- H. sammuti Eitschberger, Danner & Surholt, 1998
- H. siehei (Pungeler, 1903)
- H. stroehlei Eitschberger, Danner & Surholt, 1998
- H. tithymali (Boisduval, 1834)
- H. vespertilio (Esper, 1780)
- H. wilsoni (Rothschild, 1894)
- H. zygophylli (Ochsenheimer, 1808)
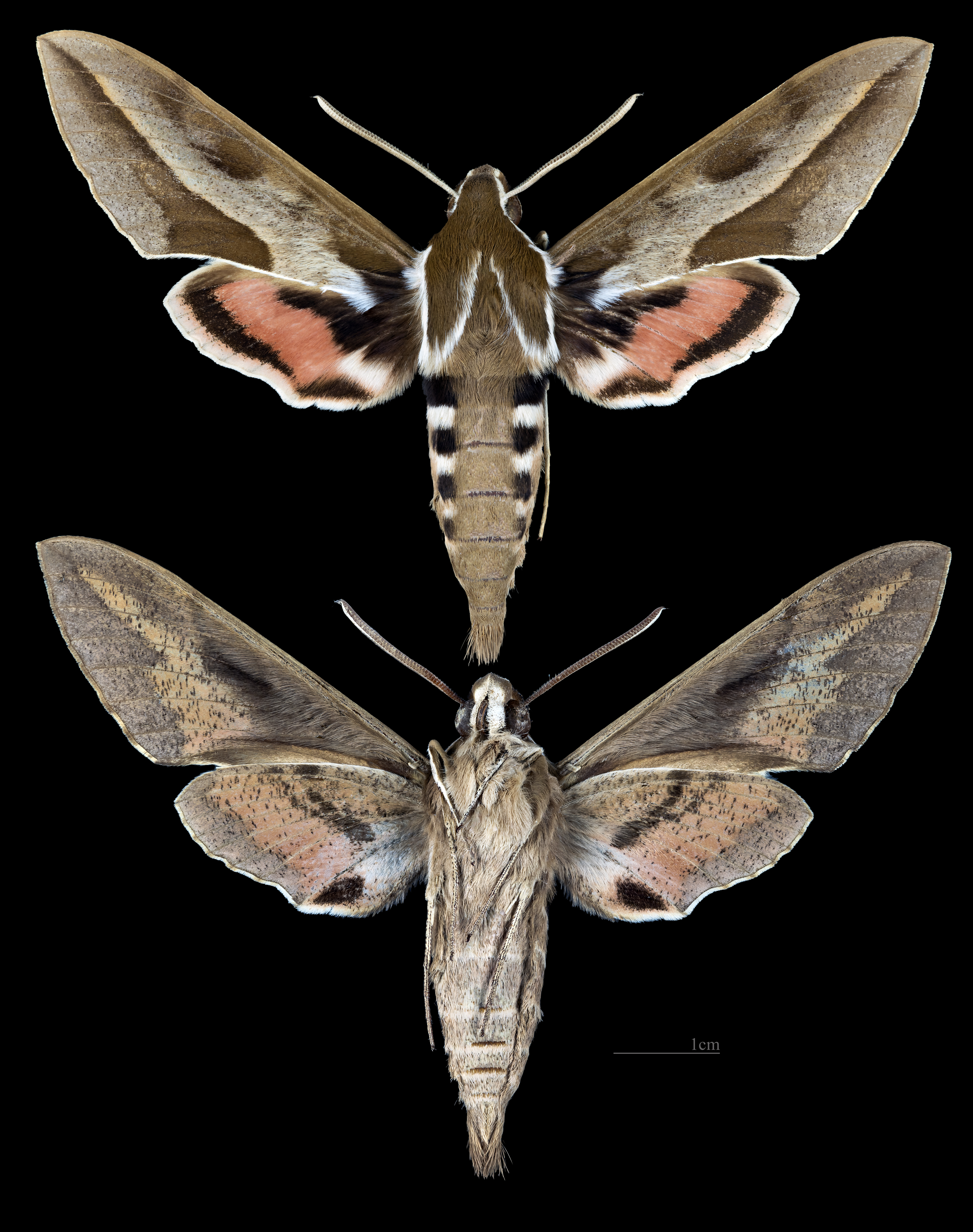
Hyles annei

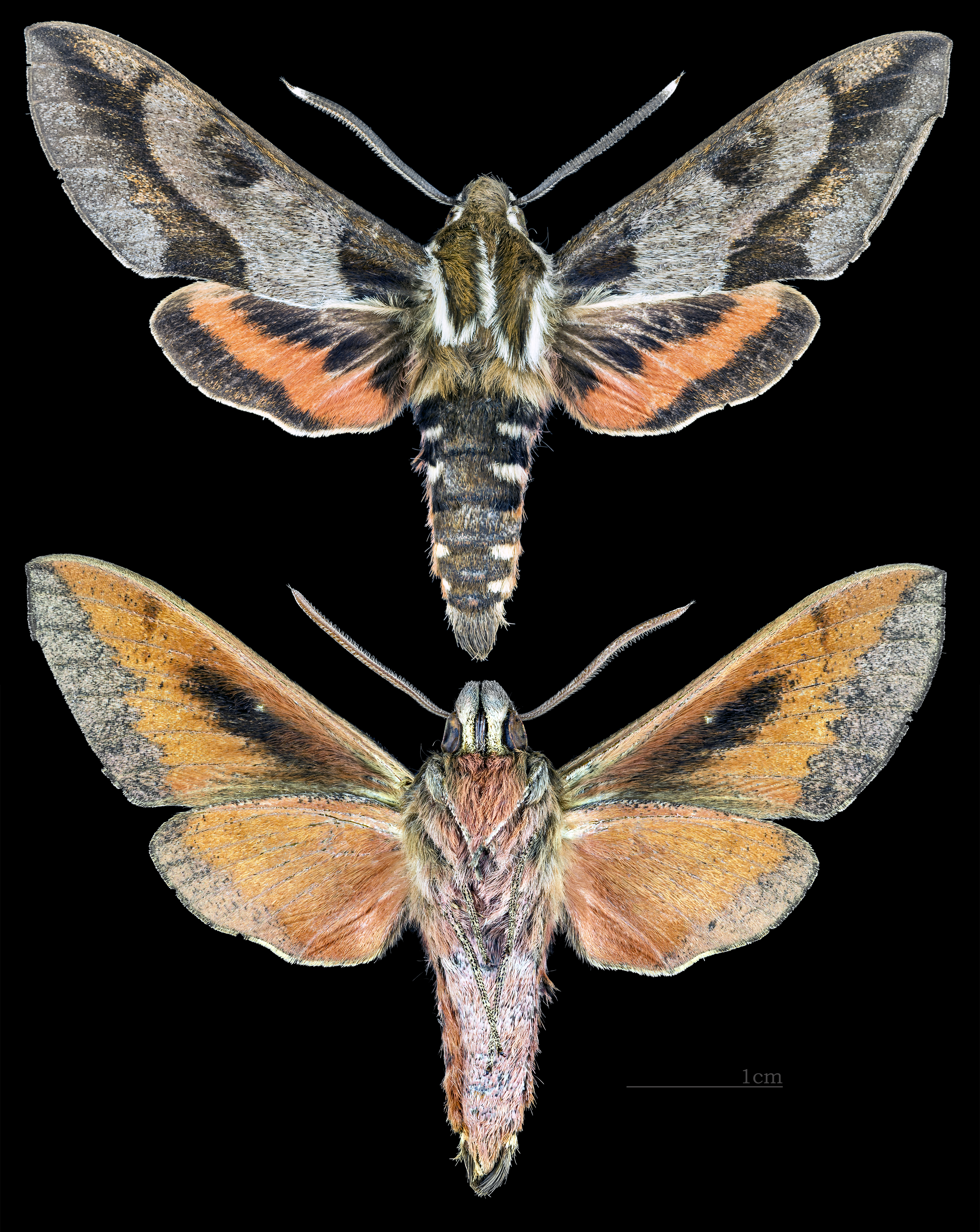
Hyles calida

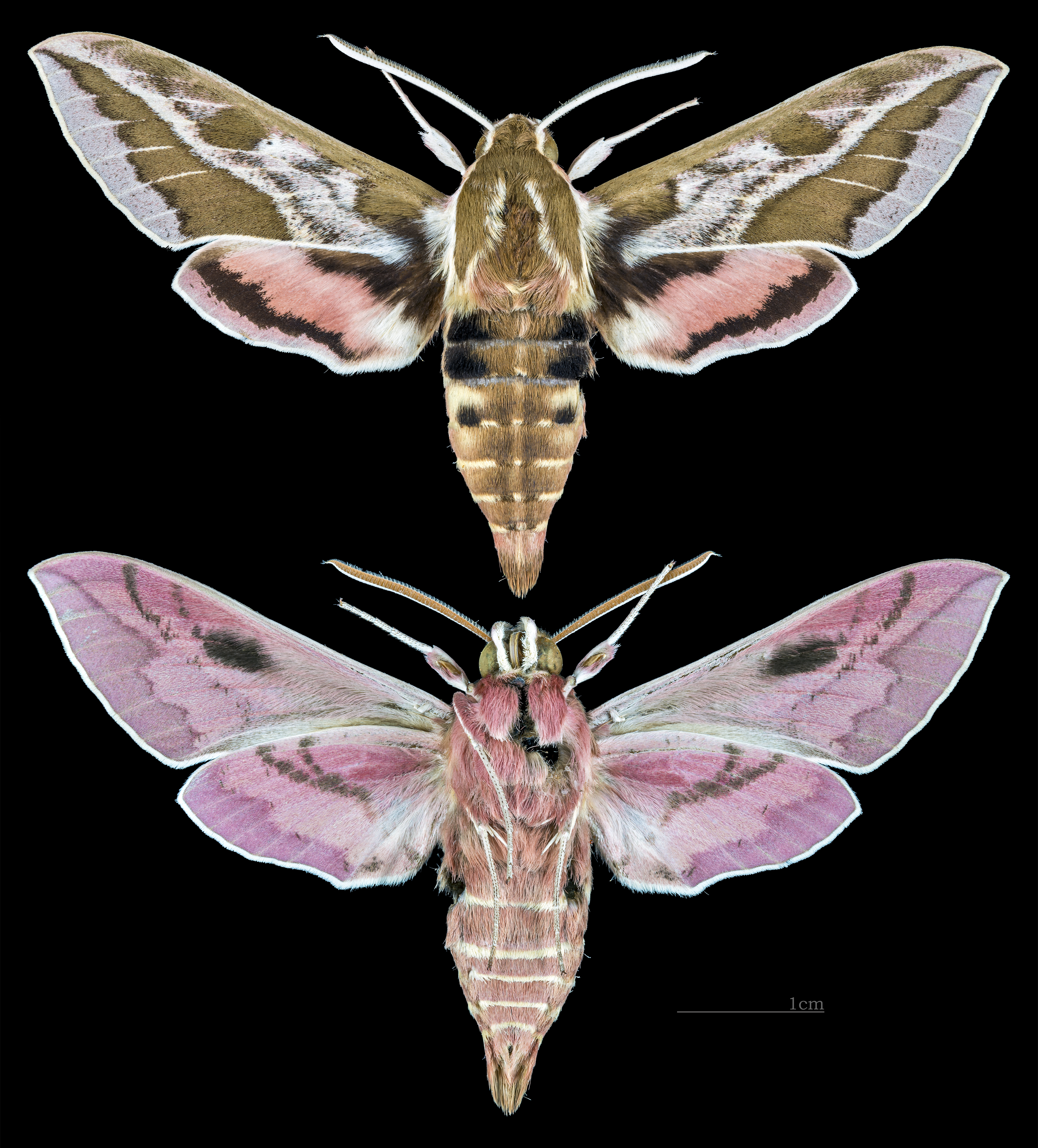
Hyles dahlii

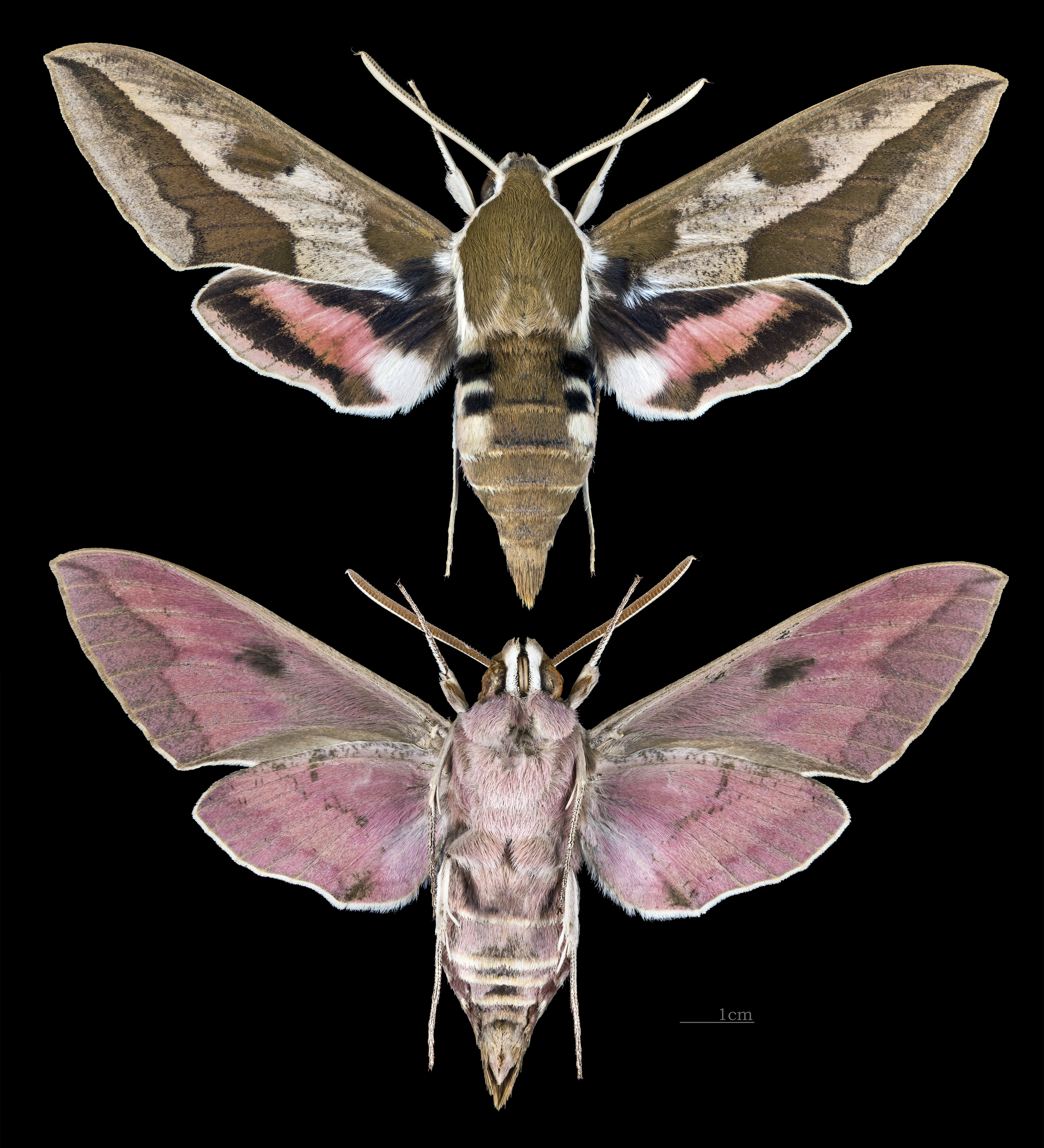
Hyles euphorbiae

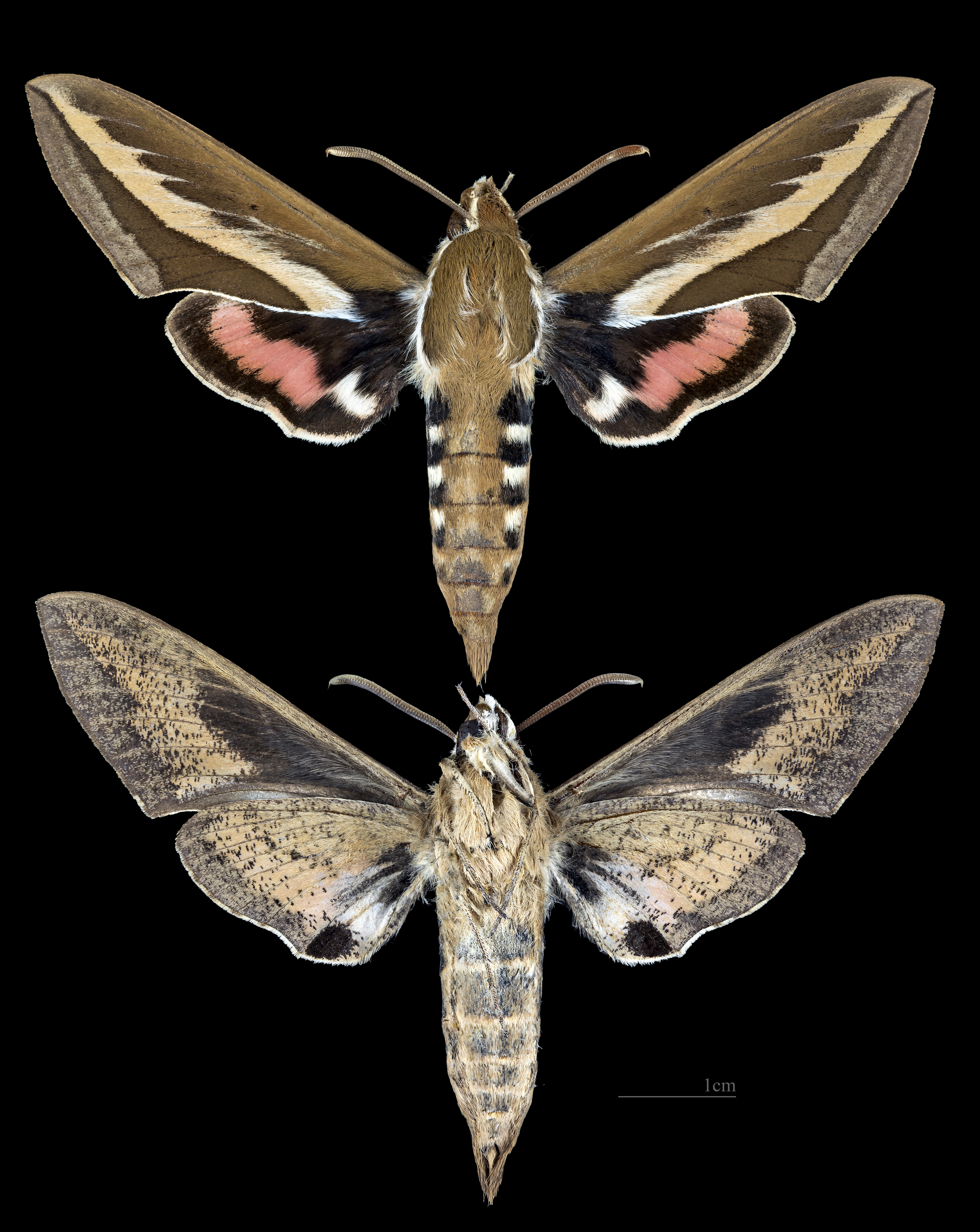
Hyles euphorbiarum

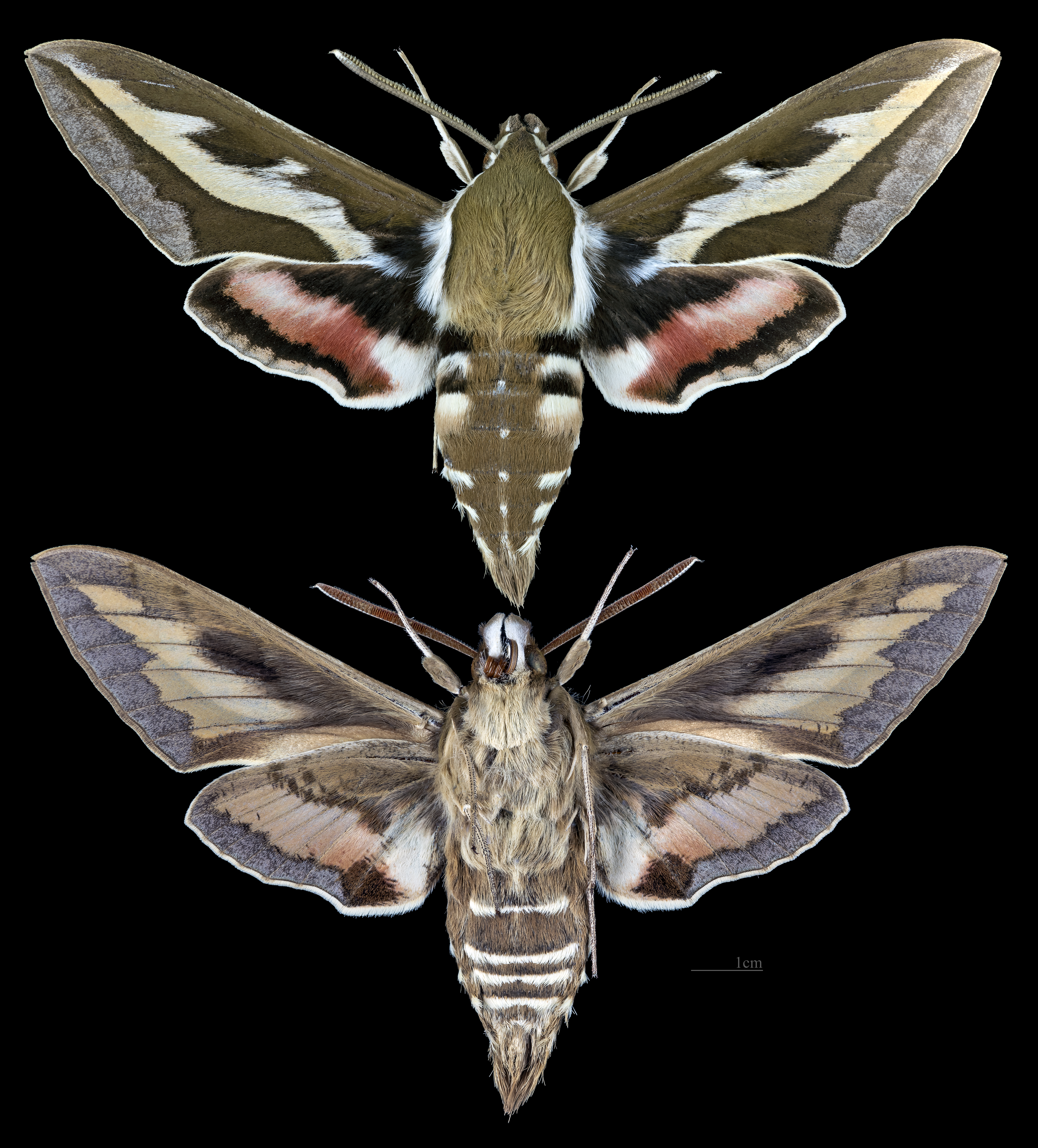
Hyles gallii

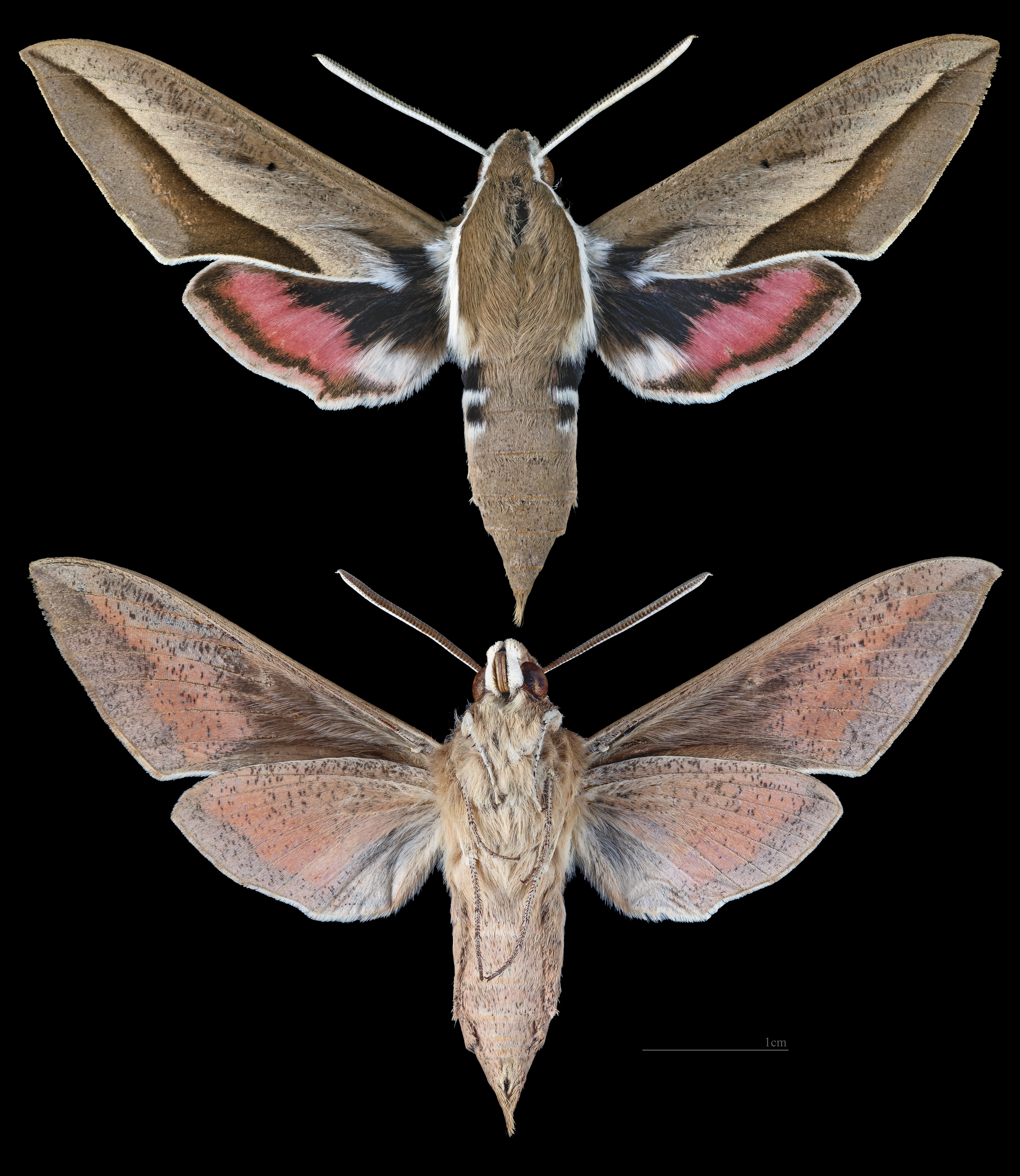
Hyles hippophaes

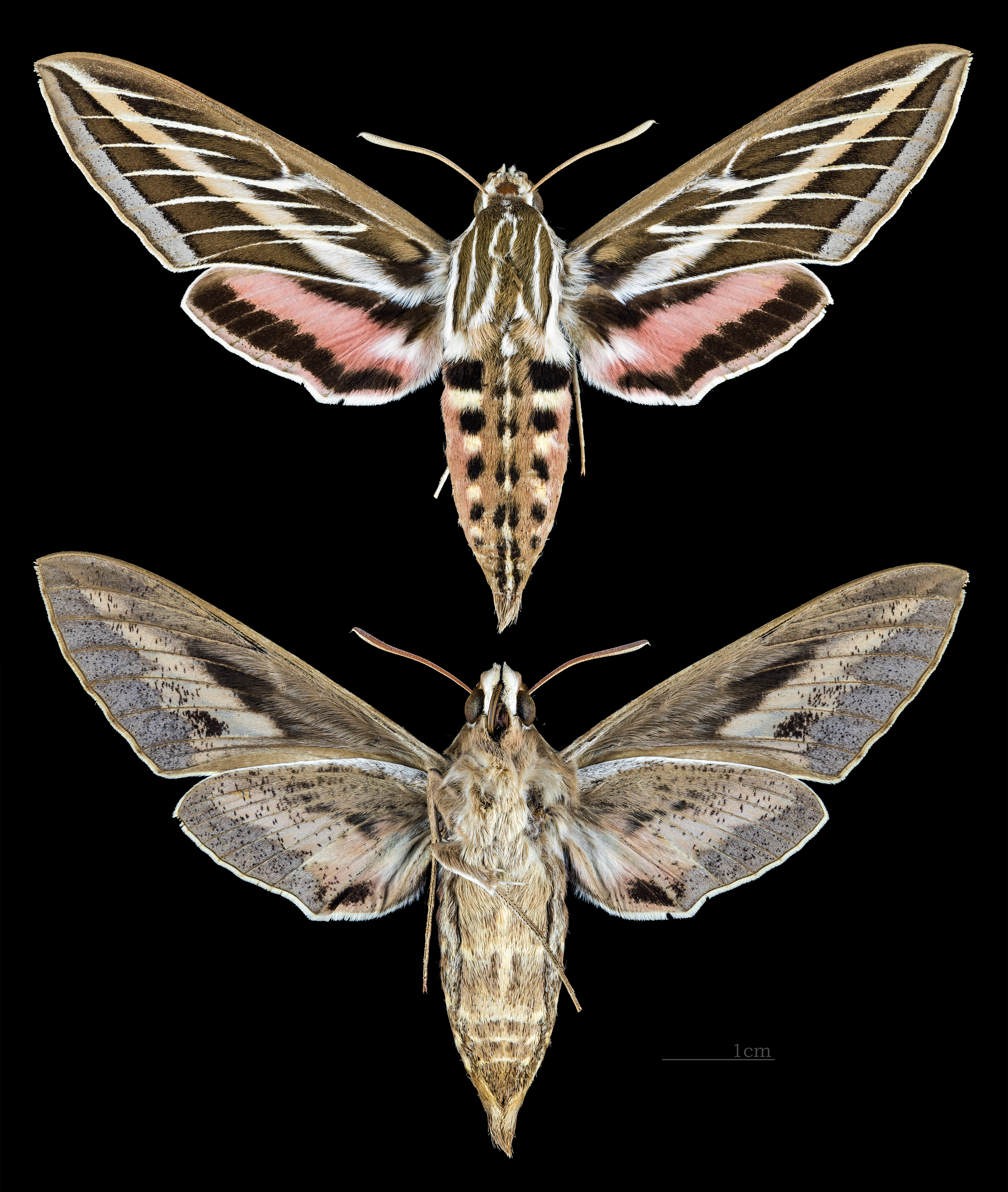
Hyles lineata

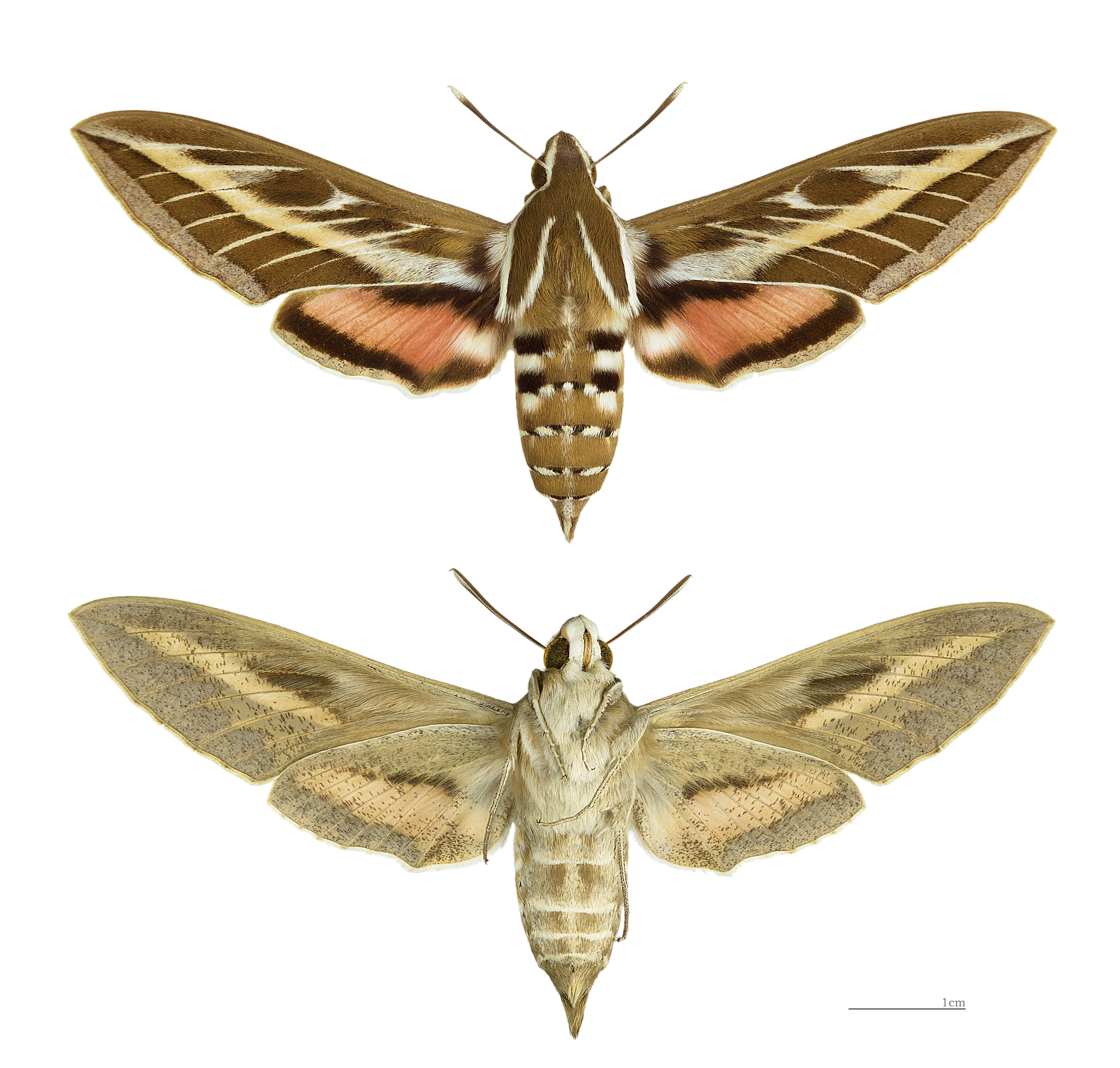
Hyles livornica

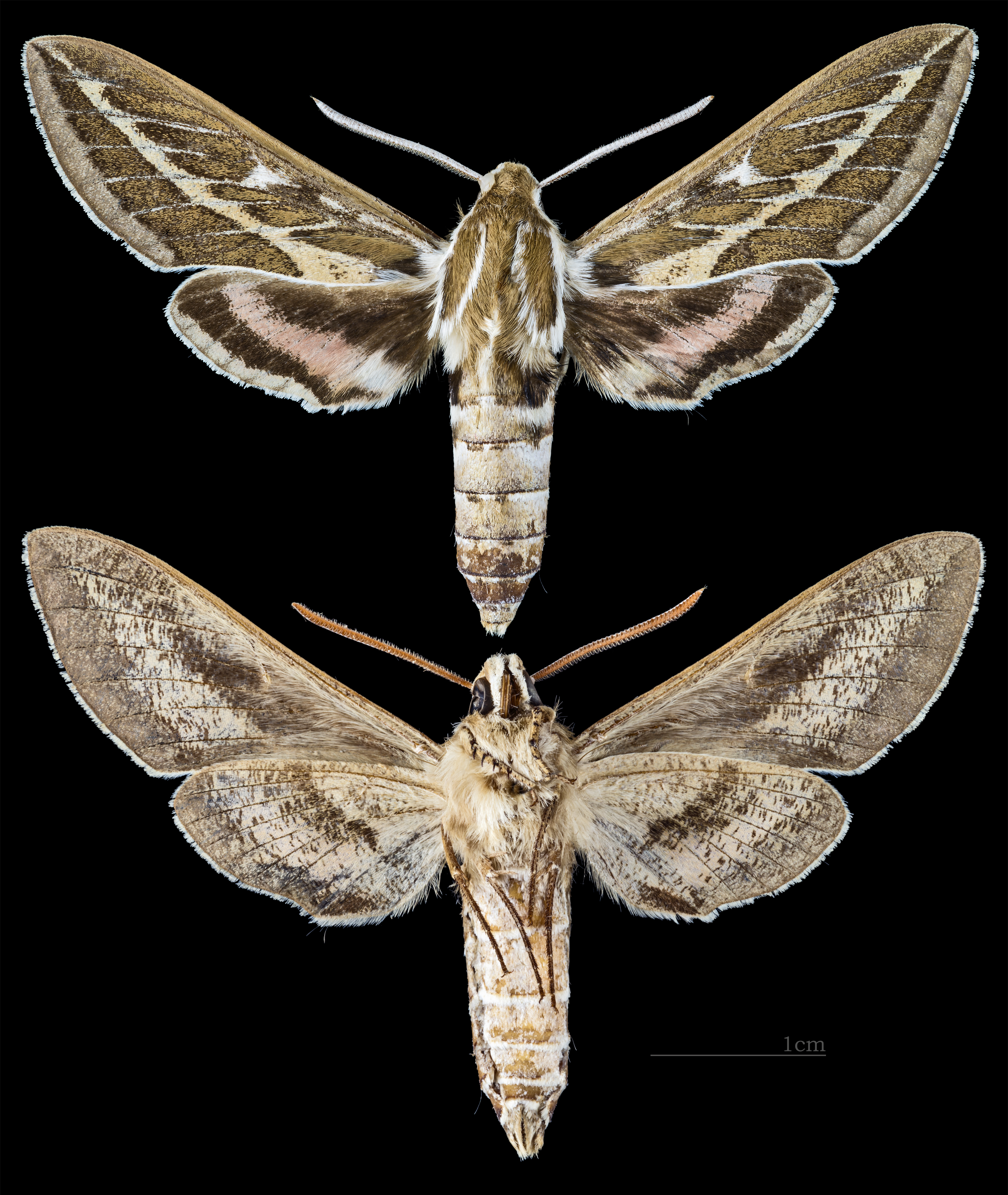
Hyles livornicoides

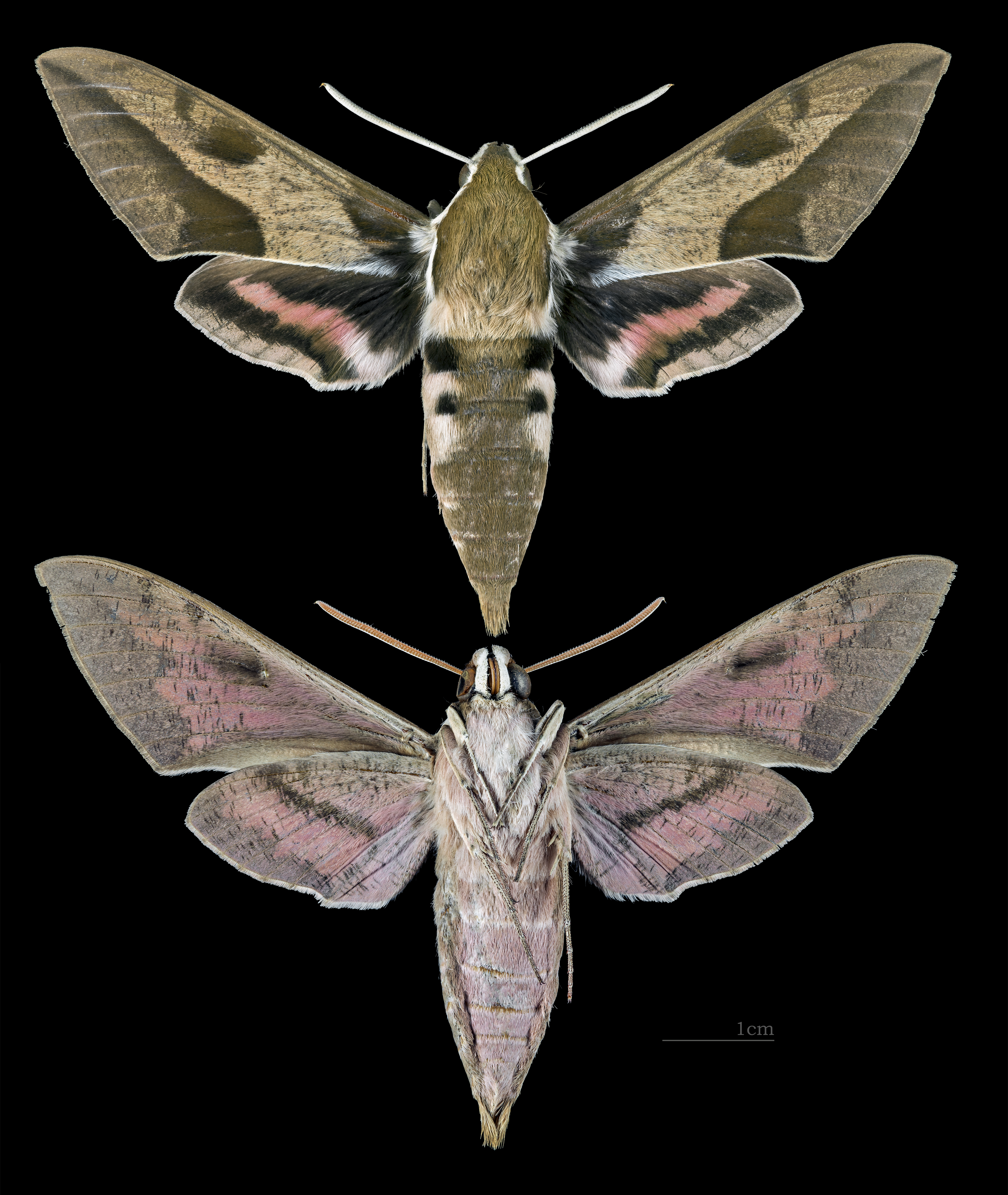
Hyles nicaea

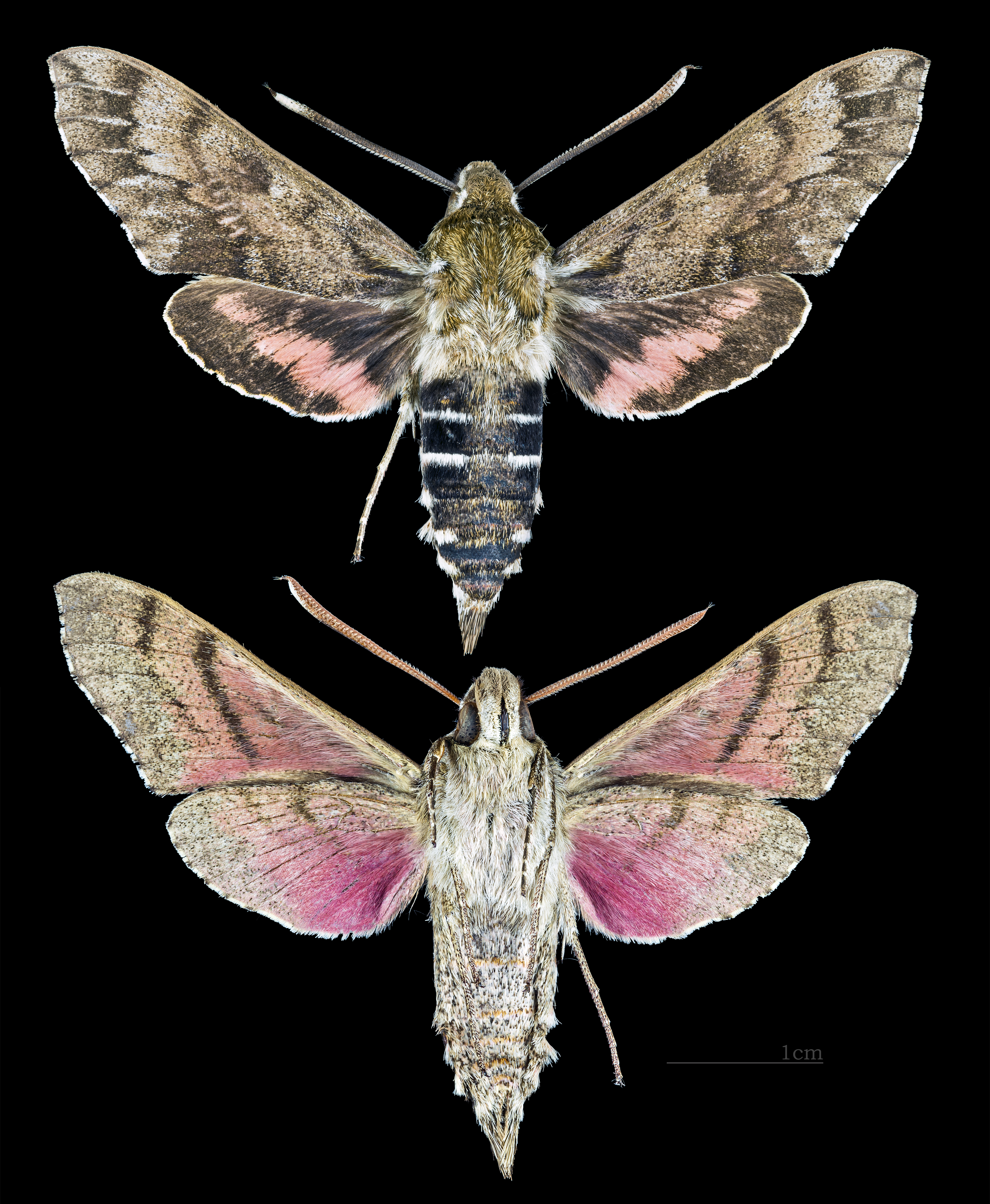
Hyles perkinsi

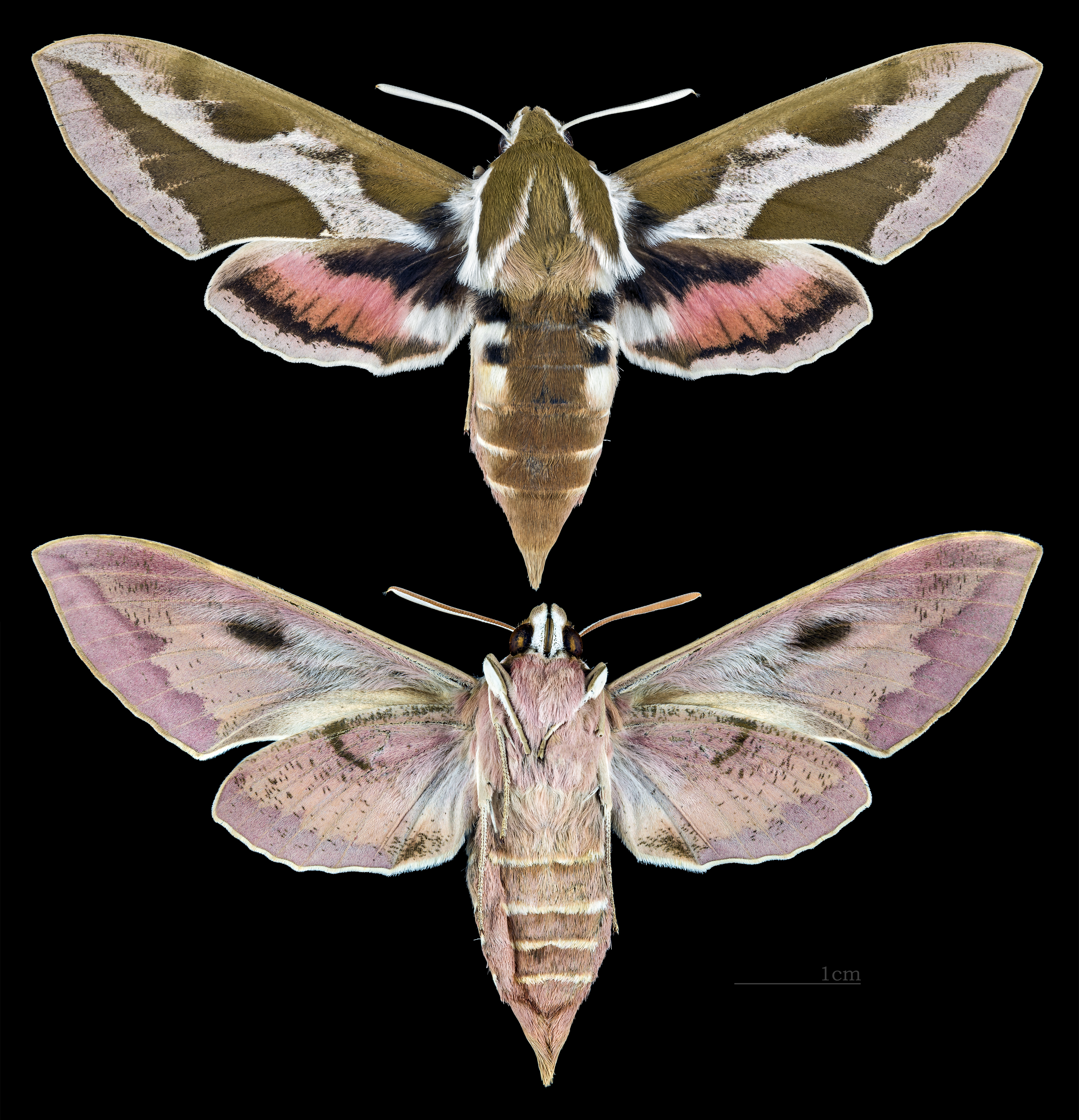
Hyles tithymali

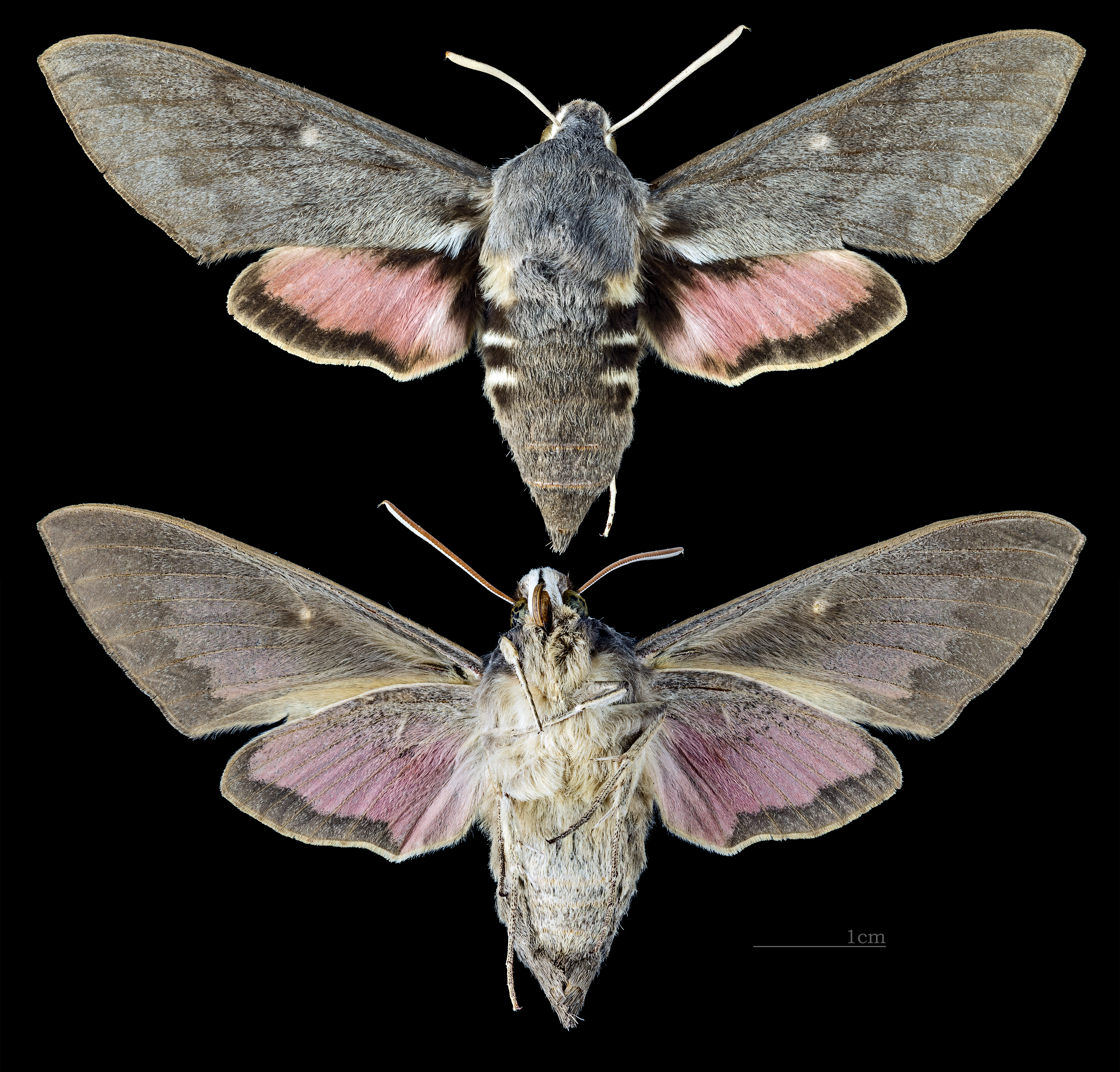
Hyles vespertilio
