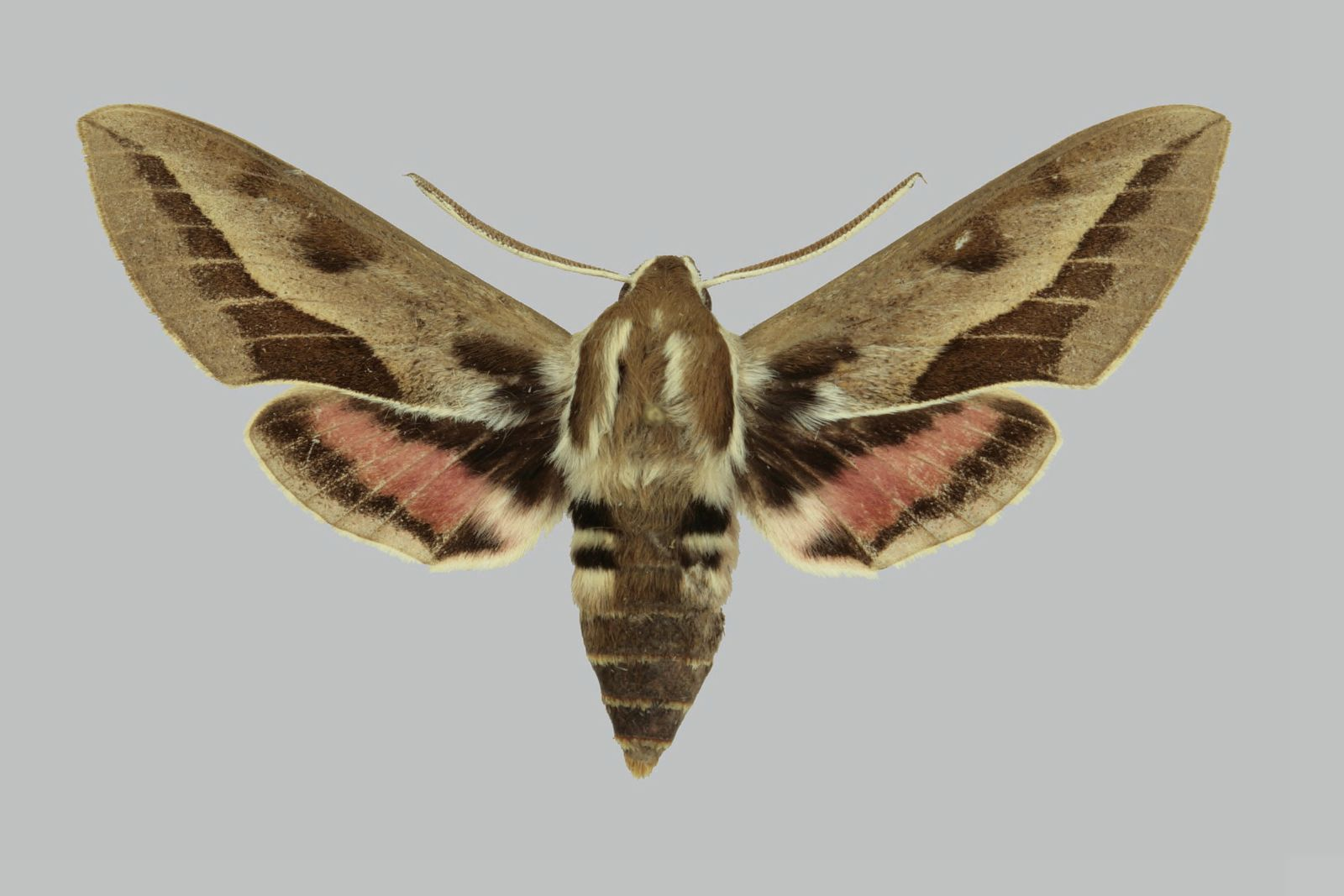
- Male

Scientific classification
- Kingdom: Animalia
- Phylum: Arthropoda
- Class: Insecta
- Order: Lepidoptera
- Family: Sphingidae
- Genus: Hyles
- Species: H. stroehlei

Binomial name
- Hyles stroehlei Eitschberger, Danner & Surholt, 1998

= Hyles stroehlei =

Hindu Kush hawkmoth

Species of moth

Hyles stroehlei, the Hindu Kush hawkmoth, is a moth of the family Sphingidae. It is only known from the Hindu Kush mountains and Kohistan, Swat, Pakistan. The wingspan is 55–70 mm. Adults are on wing from late June to early July. The species was first described by Ulf Eitschberger, Fritz Danner and Bernhard Surholt in 1998.
