= Hyles malgassica =

Scientific classification
- Kingdom: Animalia
- Phylum: Arthropoda
- Class: Insecta
- Order: Lepidoptera
- Family: Sphingidae
- Genus: Hyles
- Species: H. malgassica

Binomial name
- Hyles malgassica (Denso, 1944)

Synonyms
- Celerio malgassica Denso, 1944

Species of moth

Hyles malgassica is a moth of the family Sphingidae. It is known from Madagascar.
