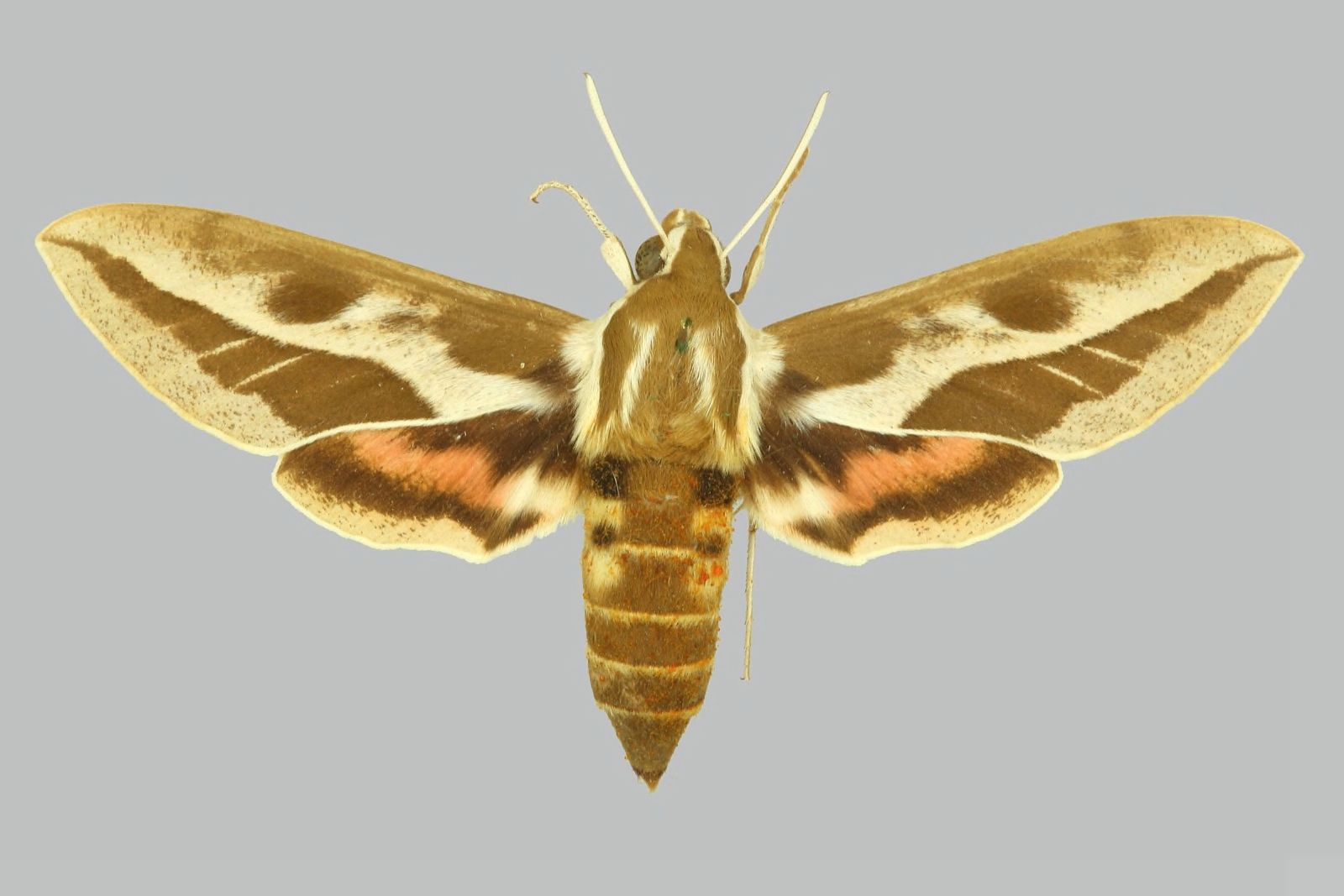
- Female

Scientific classification
- Kingdom: Animalia
- Phylum: Arthropoda
- Class: Insecta
- Order: Lepidoptera
- Family: Sphingidae
- Genus: Hyles
- Species: H. robertsi

Binomial name
- Hyles robertsi (Butler, 1880)

Synonyms
- Deilephila robertsi Butler, 1880; Deilephila robertsi peplidis Christoph, 1894; Celerio robertsi orientalis Ebert, 1969; Hyles euphorbiae robertsi

= Hyles robertsi =

Spurge hawkmoth

Species of moth

Hyles robertsi, the spurge hawkmoth, is a moth of the family Sphingidae. The species was first described by Arthur Gardiner Butler in 1880. It is known from Iran, the Kopet Dag Mountains of Turkmenistan, eastward to central and eastern Afghanistan, Kashmir and the Pamirs. It is also known from western Pakistan. Some authors consider it to be a subspecies of Hyles euphorbiae.

The wingspan is 65–85 mm. It is very similar to Hyles euphorbiae euphorbiae.

The larvae feed on herbaceous Euphorbia species.

== Subspecies ==
- Hyles robertsi robertsi
- Hyles robertsi elisabethae Ebert, 1996 (Pakistan)
- Hyles robertsi peplidis (Christoph, 1894) (Iran)
