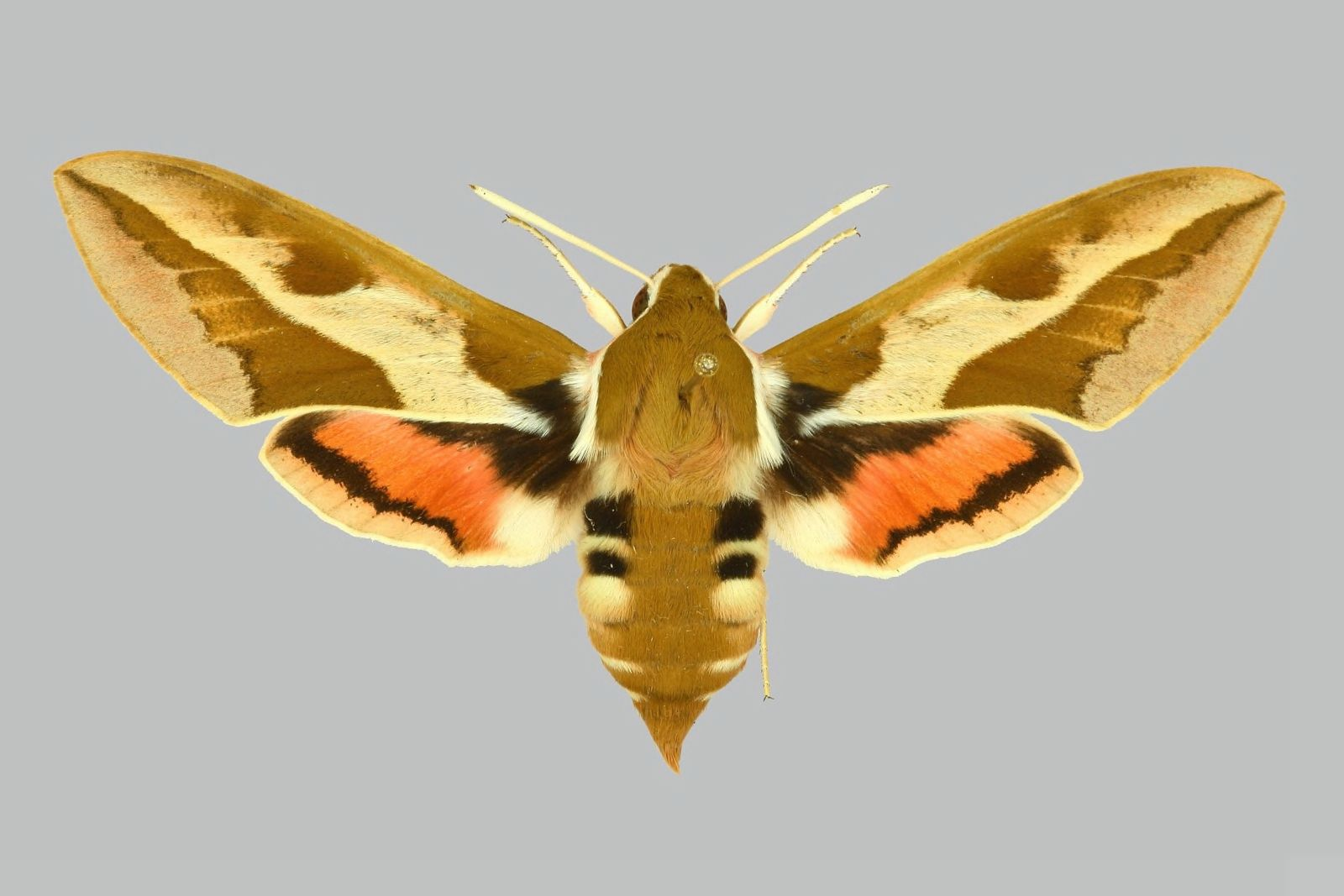
- Female

Scientific classification
- Kingdom: Animalia
- Phylum: Arthropoda
- Class: Insecta
- Order: Lepidoptera
- Family: Sphingidae
- Genus: Hyles
- Species: H. sammuti

Binomial name
- Hyles sammuti Eitschberger, Danner & Surholt, 1998

Synonyms
- Hyles tithymali sammuti

= Hyles sammuti =

Species of moth

Hyles sammuti is a moth of the family Sphingidae. Kitching and Cadiou (2000) treat it as a valid species, while Pittaway treats it as a subspecies of Hyles tithymali, seeing the larvae are very similar to Hyles tithymali mauretanica. Based on studies of the mitochondrial DNA, Hyles sammuti probably hybridises with Hyles euphorbiae.

The wingspan is 63–75 mm. There are multiple generations per year with adults on wing from February to October.

The larvae feed on Euphorbia spinosa, Euphorbia pinea and Euphorbia dendroides.
