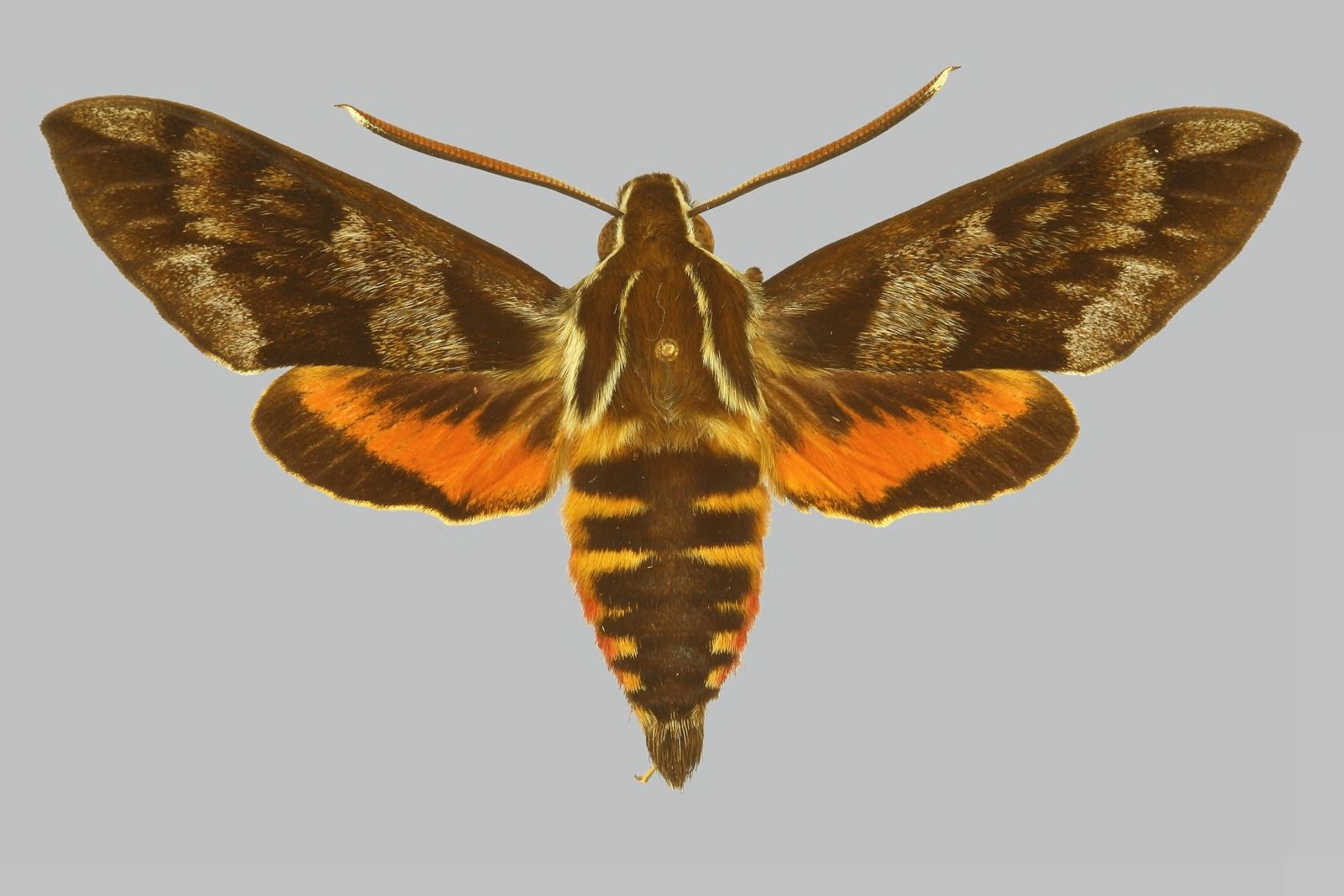
- Male

Scientific classification
- Kingdom: Animalia
- Phylum: Arthropoda
- Class: Insecta
- Order: Lepidoptera
- Family: Sphingidae
- Genus: Hyles
- Species: H. wilsoni

Binomial name
- Hyles wilsoni (Rothschild, 1894)

Synonyms
- Deilephila wilsoni Rothschild, 1894; Deilephila pyrias Meyrick, 1899; Celerio wilsoni; Hawaiina wilsoni

= Hyles wilsoni =

Wilson's sphinx

Species of moth

Hyles wilsoni, or Wilson's sphinx, is a species of moth of the family Sphingidae. It was described by Walter Rothschild in 1894. It is endemic to the island of Hawaii.

In wet districts the moth is freely on the wing at all hours of the day, visiting the flowers of Metrosideros, as well as those of cultivated plants. In drier localities it flies more freely at dusk.

Larvae have been recorded on Acacia koa, Bobea, Euphorbia, Metrosideros, Pelea and Straussia.
