= Stonesthrow Lake =

Lake in Washington (state)

- Location within Washington (state) Location within the United States
- Location: Kittitas County, Washington, United States
- Coordinates: 47°22′46″N 121°19′41″W
- Primary outflows: Unnamed
- Basin countries: United States
- Surface area: 1.5 acres (0.0061 km^{2})
- Surface elevation: 4,423 ft (1,348 m)

Stonesthrow Lake is a small freshwater lake located within the Alpine Lakes Wilderness in a valley on the eastern slope of Rampart Ridge in Kittitas County, Washington, United States. Because of its close proximity to Snoqualmie Pass, Interstate 90 and several cirque on both sides of Rampart Ridge, the lake is a common area for hiking, swimming, and fishing cutthroat trout and rainbow trout. Keechelus Ridge is a short distance south on trail 4934 which covers the length of the ridge. Stonesthrow Lake is between Keechelus Lake on the West and Kachess Lake further East.

== Location ==
Stonesthrow Lake sits on the eastern aspect of the meadow valley. It shares with Margaret Lake on the eastern skirt of Mount Margaret. Swan Lake and Rock Rabbit Lakes are a short distance southeast, on the north aspect of Keechelus ridge.

Access to Stonesthrow Lake is through Lake Lillian Trail #1332, which starts at a trailhead for Mt Margaret and Lake Lillian off National Forest Development Road 4934. The trail goes through tree plantations and old-growth forests until it reaches the ridge of the mountain where it branches off as Lake Margaret Trail #1332.1. The parking at Lake Lillian Trail is adequate for 20 vehicles. The trailhead is approximately half-mile from the start of Rd 4934 off of Forest Road 4832. The trail down the ridge towards Margaret Lake first crosses Lake Yvonne. Stonesthrow Lake is in a meadows area where it is east of Lake Margaret down a mountain slope.

== Flora ==
Major flora growing within the Stonesthrow marsh area and prominent in the summer months include huckleberry bushes and wildflowers such as bear grass, lupins, paintbrush lilies, tiger lilies, and fireweed.

== See also ==
- List of lakes of the Alpine Lakes Wilderness
