= Fireweed (disambiguation) =

Fireweed (Epilobium angustifolium or Chamaenerion angustifolium) is a perennial herbaceous plant in the willowherb family (Onagraceae).

Fireweed: may also refer to:

== Plants ==
- A species of plant in the genus Chamaenerion
- A common name for Erechtites hieraciifolius, a plant in the sunflower family
- A common name for Senecio madagascariensis in Australia and Hawaii
- Crassocephalum crepidioides (ebolo), an annual herbaceous plant in the sunflower family (Asteraceae)
- Mexican fireweed, Bassia scoparia, a shrub in family Amaranthaceae
- Apalochlamys spectabilis, a plant in the family Asteraceae, from Australia
- A folk name for dodder
- Chamaenerion latifolium, known as dwarf fireweed

== Other uses ==
- Aglaophenia cupressina, a hydrozoa
- Lyngbya majuscula, a cyanobacterium
- Fireweed (periodical), a feminist literary magazine founded in Toronto, Canada, in 1978
