= Swan Lake (Washington) =

Lake in Washington (state)

- Location within Washington (state) Location within the United States
- Location: Kittitas County, Washington, United States
- Coordinates: 47.3755°N 121.3203°W
- Primary inflows: Gale Creek
- Primary outflows: Gale Creek
- Basin countries: United States
- Surface area: 7.3 acres (0.030 km^{2})
- Surface elevation: 4,029 ft (1,228 m)

Swan Lake is an alpine freshwater lake located within the Alpine Lakes Wilderness in a valley on the northern slope of Keechelus Ridge in Kittitas County, Washington, United States. Because of its close proximity to Rampart Ridge, Interstate 90 and several cirque on both sides of Keechelus Ridge, the lake is a common area for hiking, swimming, and fishing cutthroat trout. Keechelus Ridge is accessed through trail 4934 which covers the length of the ridge. Swan Lakes is between Keechelus Lake on the West and Kachess Lake further East.

== Location ==
Swan Lake sits on the north aspect of the valley it shares with Rock Rabbit Lakes. Stonesthrow Lake is on the north ridge of the valley, with Margaret Lake a short distance west at the skirt of Mount Margaret.

== Flora ==
Major flora growing within the lake and prominent in the summer months include huckleberry bushes and wildflowers such as bear grass, lupins, paintbrush lilies, tiger lilies, and fireweed.

== See also ==
- List of lakes of the Alpine Lakes Wilderness
