= Epilobium rosmarinifolium =

Epilobium rosmarinifolium is a botanical synonym of two species of plant:

- Chamaenerion dodonaei published in 1788 by Thaddäus Haenke (1761–1817)
- Epilobium leptophyllum published in 1813 by Frederick Traugott Pursh (1774–1820)
