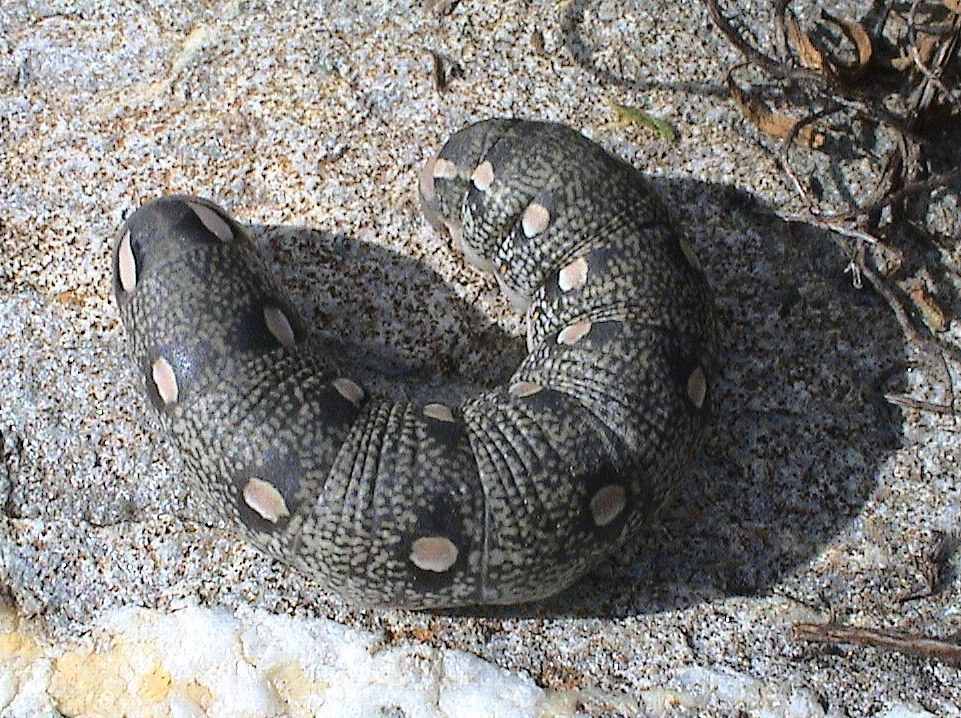
- Caterpillar

Scientific classification
- Kingdom: Animalia
- Phylum: Arthropoda
- Clade: Pancrustacea
- Class: Insecta
- Order: Lepidoptera
- Family: Sphingidae
- Genus: Hyles
- Species: H. vespertilio

Binomial name
- Hyles vespertilio (Esper, 1780)

Synonyms
- Sphinx vespertilio Esper, 1780; Hyles salmonea (Oberthür, 1894); Hyles flava (Blachier, 1905); Hyles murina (Austaut, 1905); Hyles explicata (Dannehl, 1933); Deilephila vespertilio burckhardti (Mory, 1901)

= Hyles vespertilio =

Species of moth

Hyles vespertilio is a moth of the family Sphingidae.

== Distribution ==
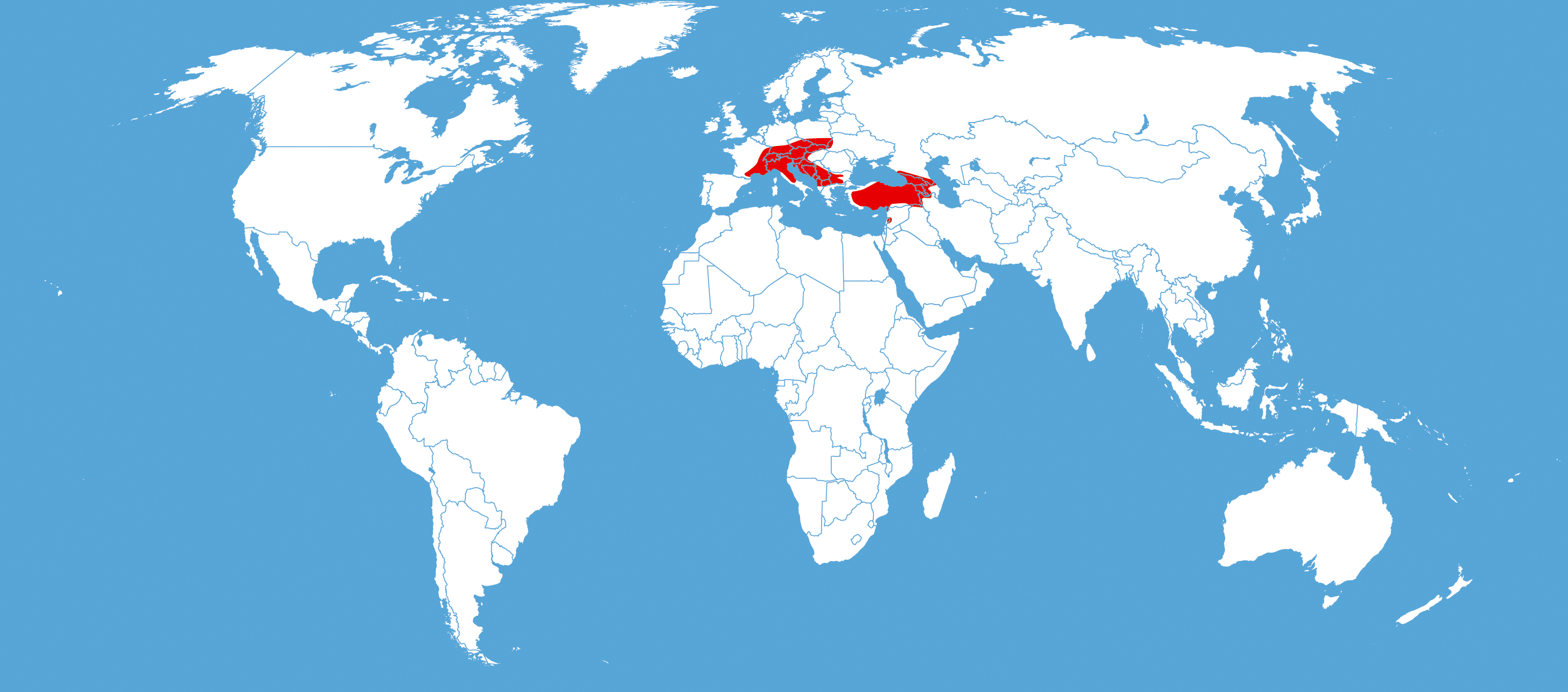
Range

It is found in central Europe and the Balkan Peninsula, as well as from Anatolia to the Caucasus.

== Description ==
The wingspan is 60–80 mm.

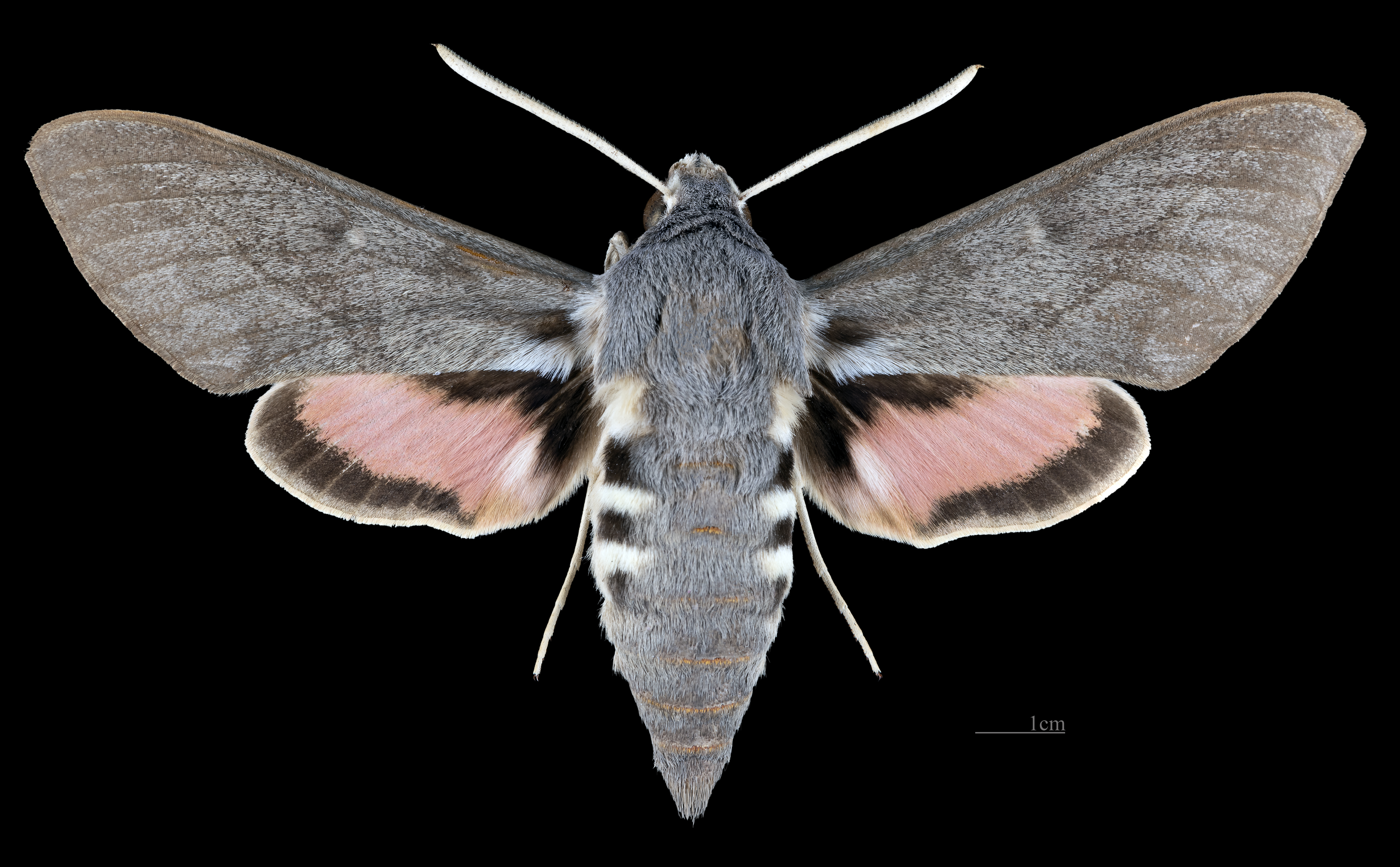
Male dorsal

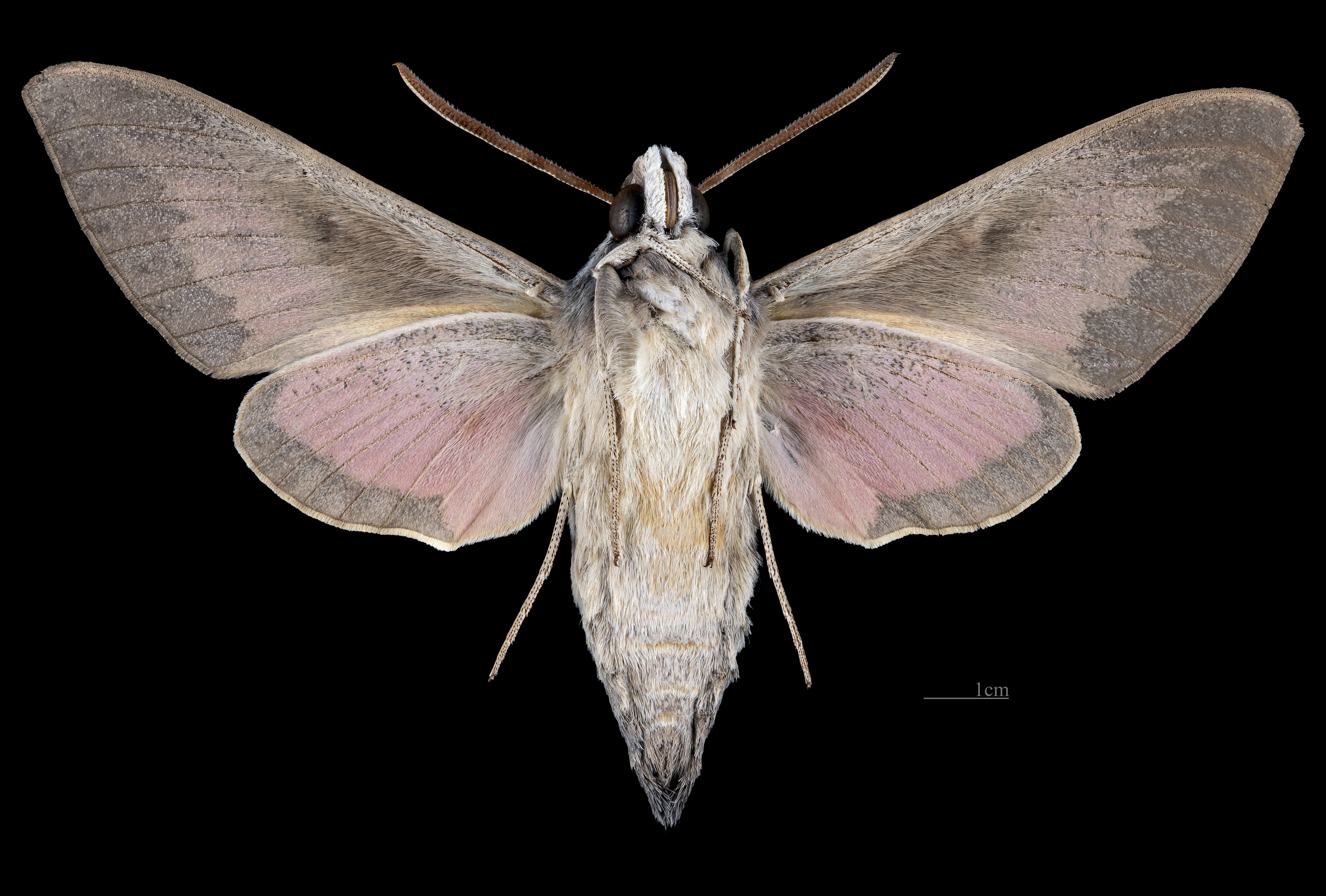
Male ventral

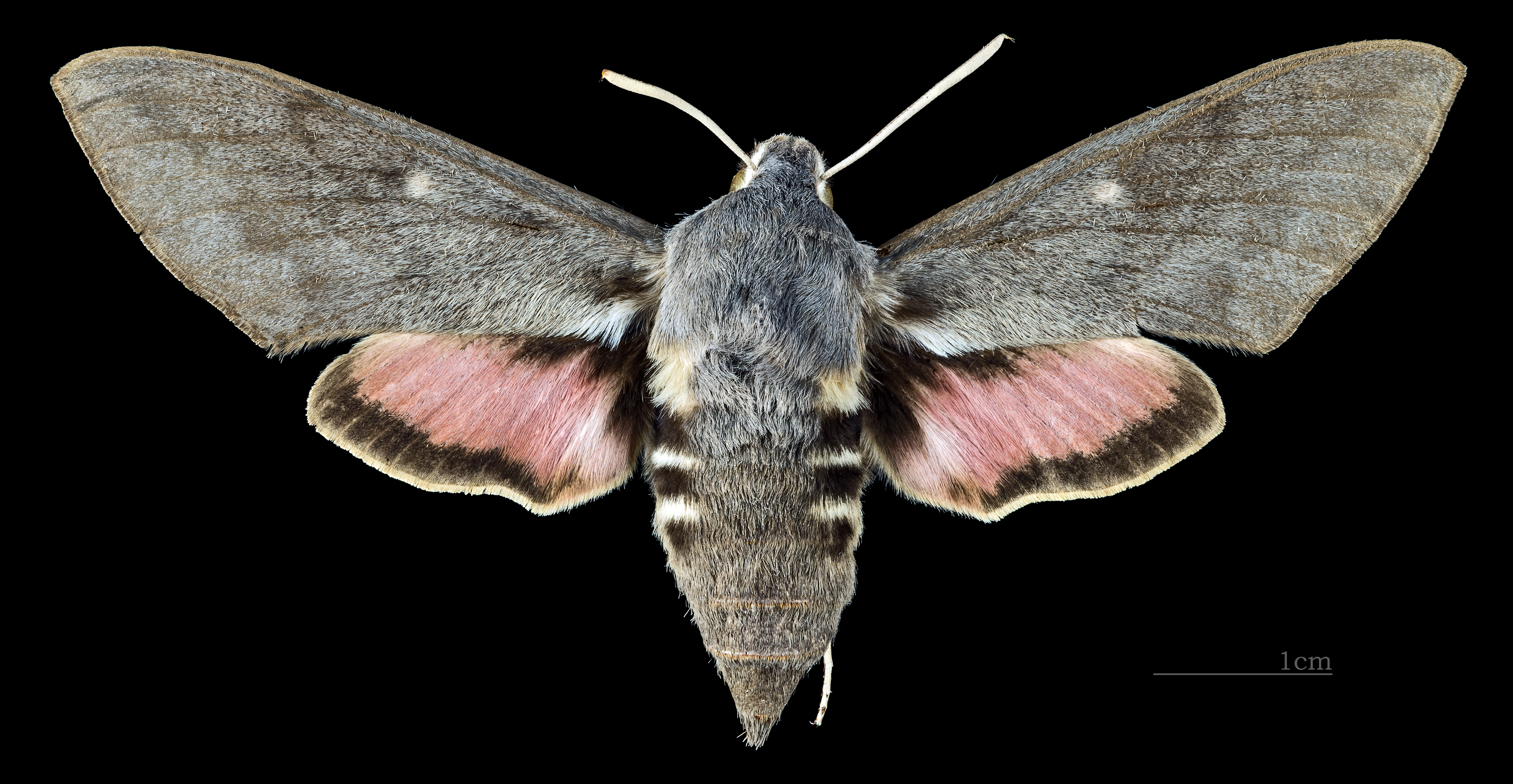
Female dorsal

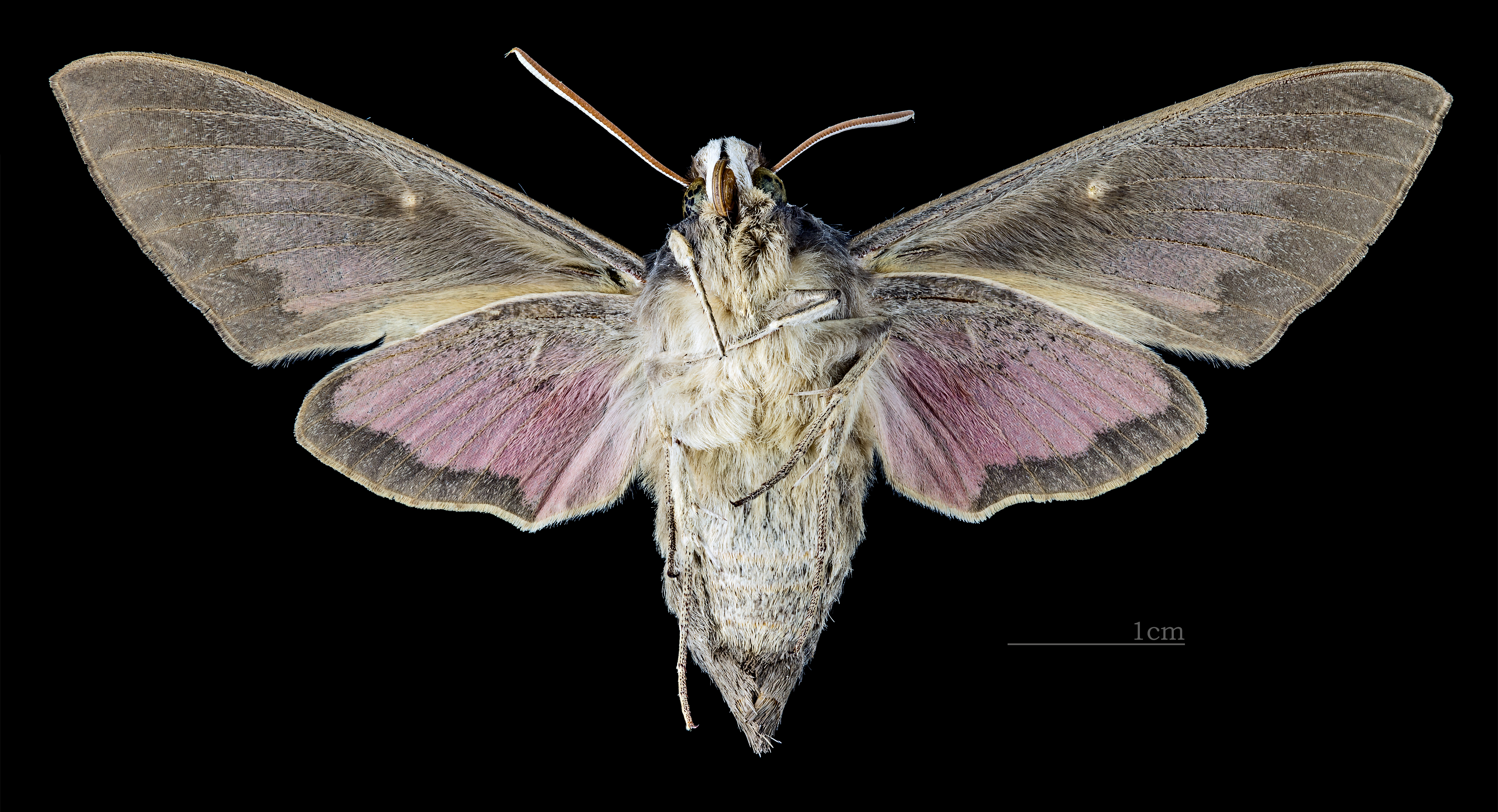
Female ventral

== Biology ==
Adults are on wing from May to June and from August to September in a partial second generation in most of the range. On high altitudes in central Europe and Bulgaria, there is only one generation from June to July.

The larvae feed on Epilobium species (including Epilobium dodonaei), Oenothera and Galium.
