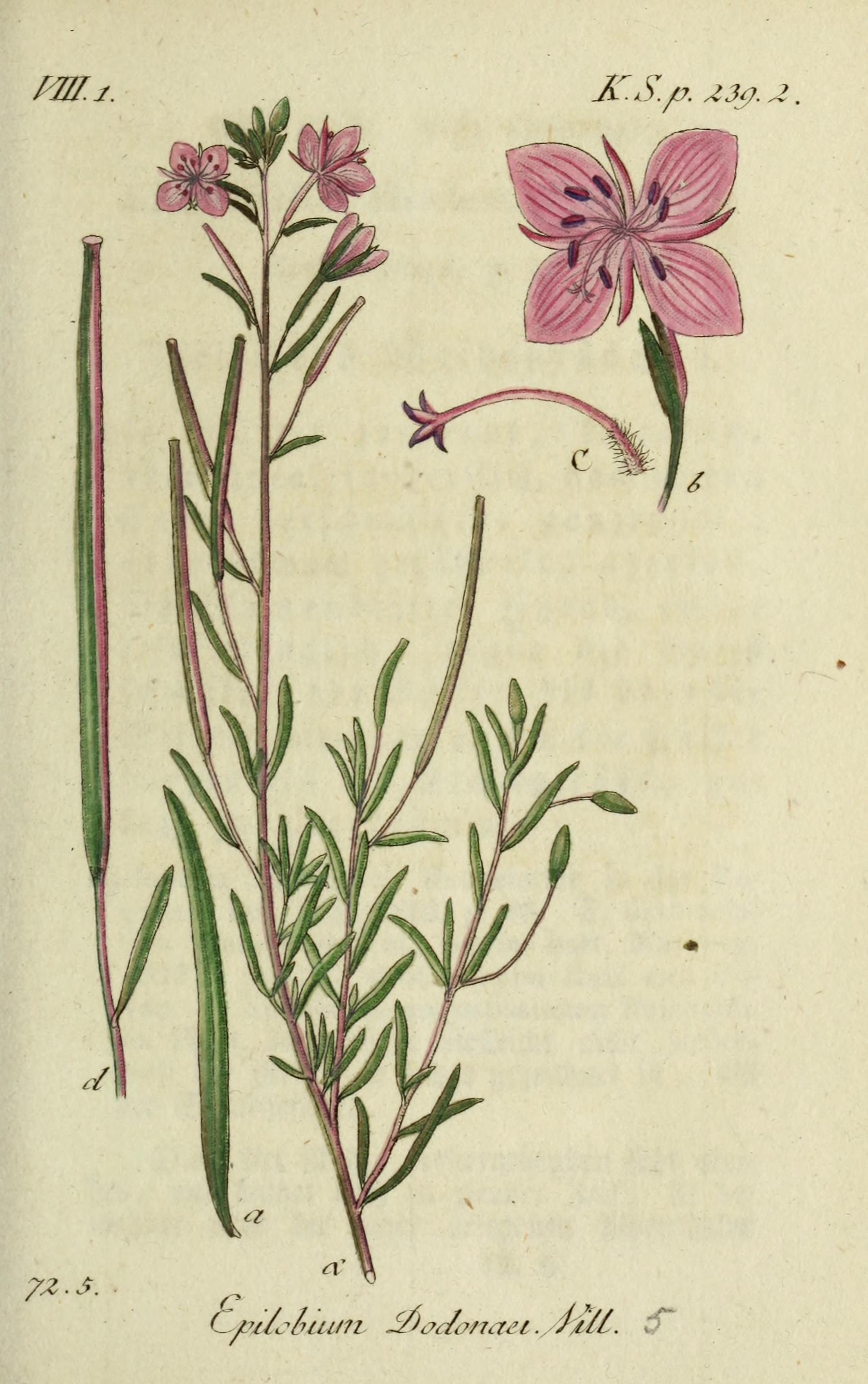
- Illustration by Jacob Sturm

Scientific classification
- Kingdom: Plantae
- Clade: Tracheophytes
- Clade: Angiosperms
- Clade: Eudicots
- Clade: Rosids
- Order: Myrtales
- Family: Onagraceae
- Genus: Chamaenerion
- Species: C. dodonaei

Binomial name
- Chamaenerion dodonaei (Vill.) Schur ex Fuss.

Synonyms
- Chamerion dodonaei (Vill.) Holub; Epilobium dodonaei Vill.; Epilobium rosmarinifolium Haenke

= Chamaenerion dodonaei =

Genus of flowering plants in the willowherb family

Chamaenerion dodonaei is a perennial herbaceous flowering plant in the willowherb family, Onagraceae.

== Description ==
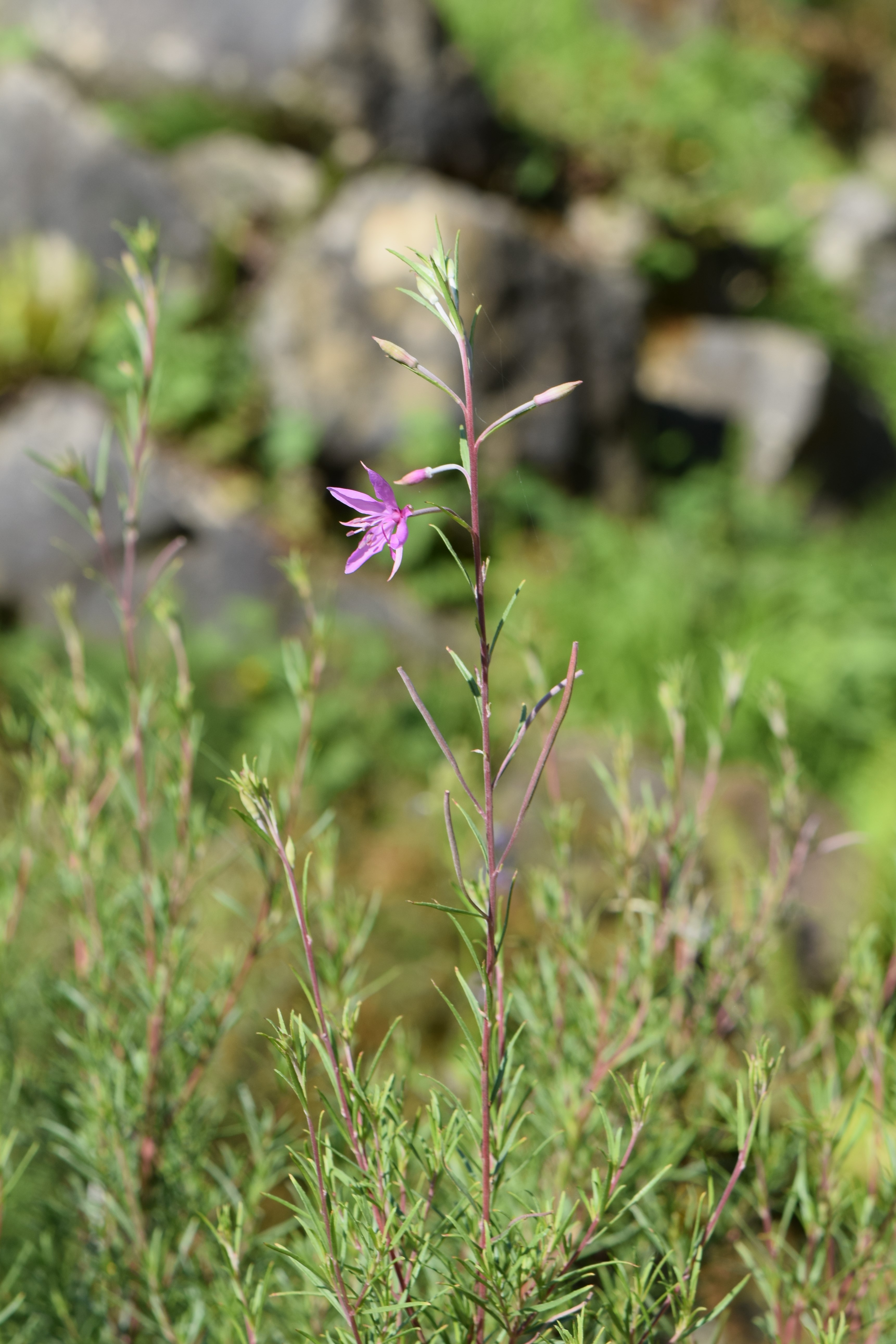
Habitus

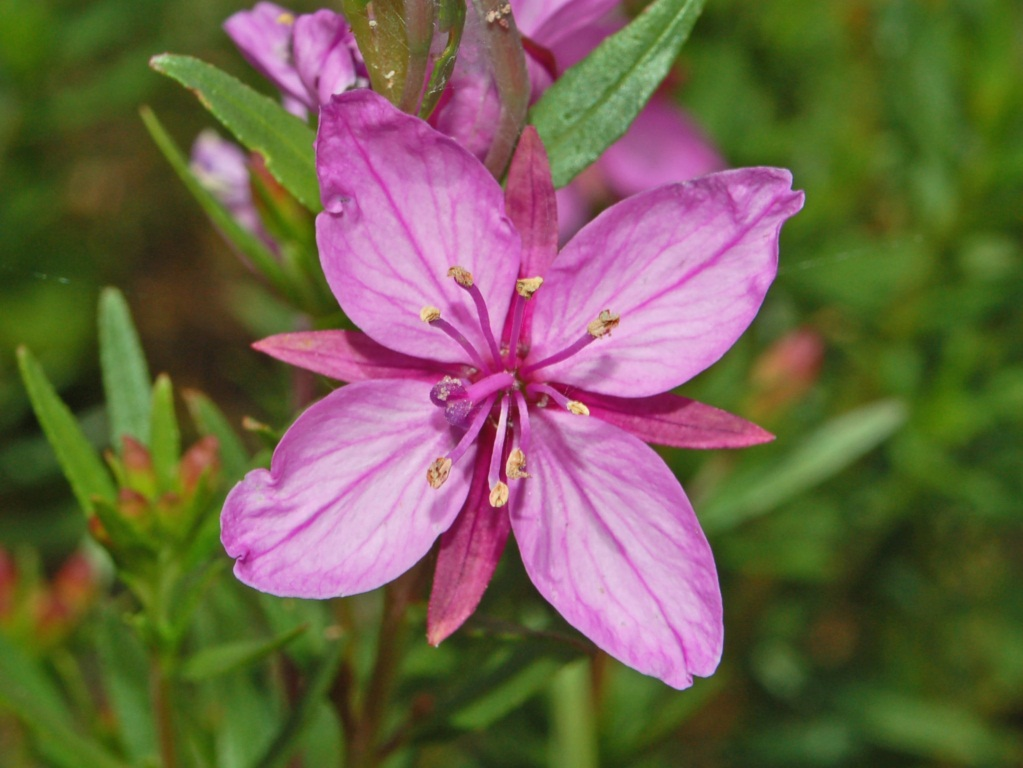
Inflorescence

=== Lookalikes ===
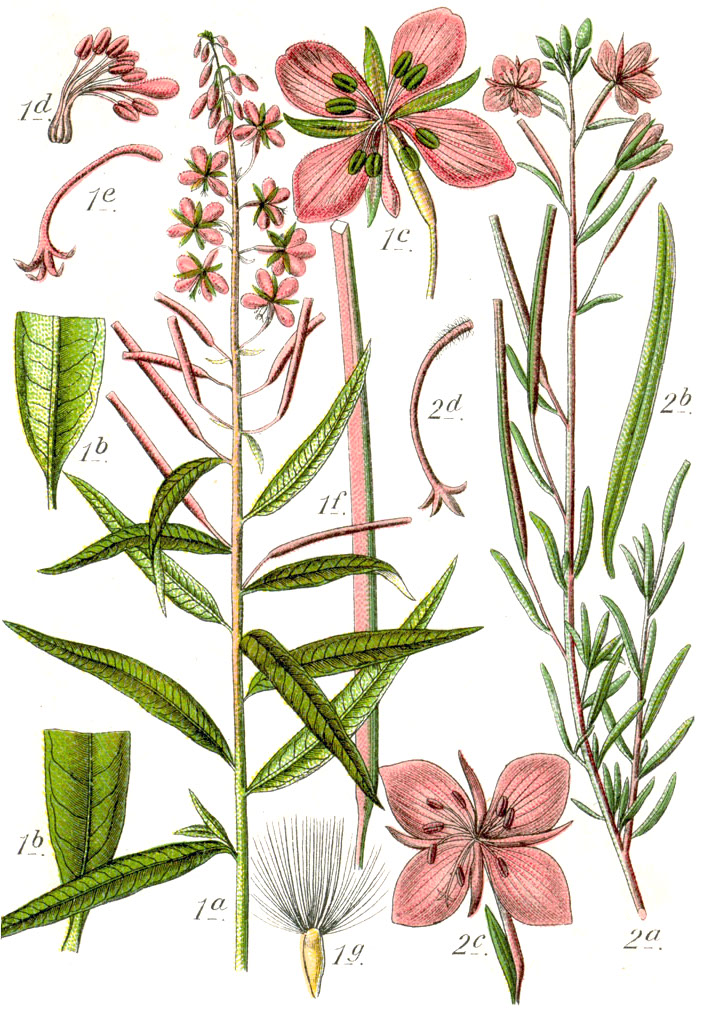
C. angustifolium (1) vs C. dodonaei (2).

It is a common species within its range and easily distinguished from other species, although it is sometimes confused with C. angustifolium.

== Distribution and habitat ==
Within the Pannonian macroregion, it is absent from the east, but present in the west. It also extends to the Dalmatian Coast.

It is found in sandy and rocky places, and on dry ruderal sites.

== Bibliography ==
- COL (2025-04-10). "Chamaenerion dodonaei (Vill.) Schur ex Fuss". Catalogue of Life.
- Kew (2023). "Arum rupicola Boiss". International Plant Names Index and World Checklist of Vascular Plants.
- Strgulc Krajšek, Sumona; Šegedin, Tamara; Jogan, Nejc (2009-06-30). "Revision of Epilobium and Chamerion in the Croatian herbaria ZA and ZAHO". Natura Croatica. 18 (1): 155–167. eISSN 1848-7386.
