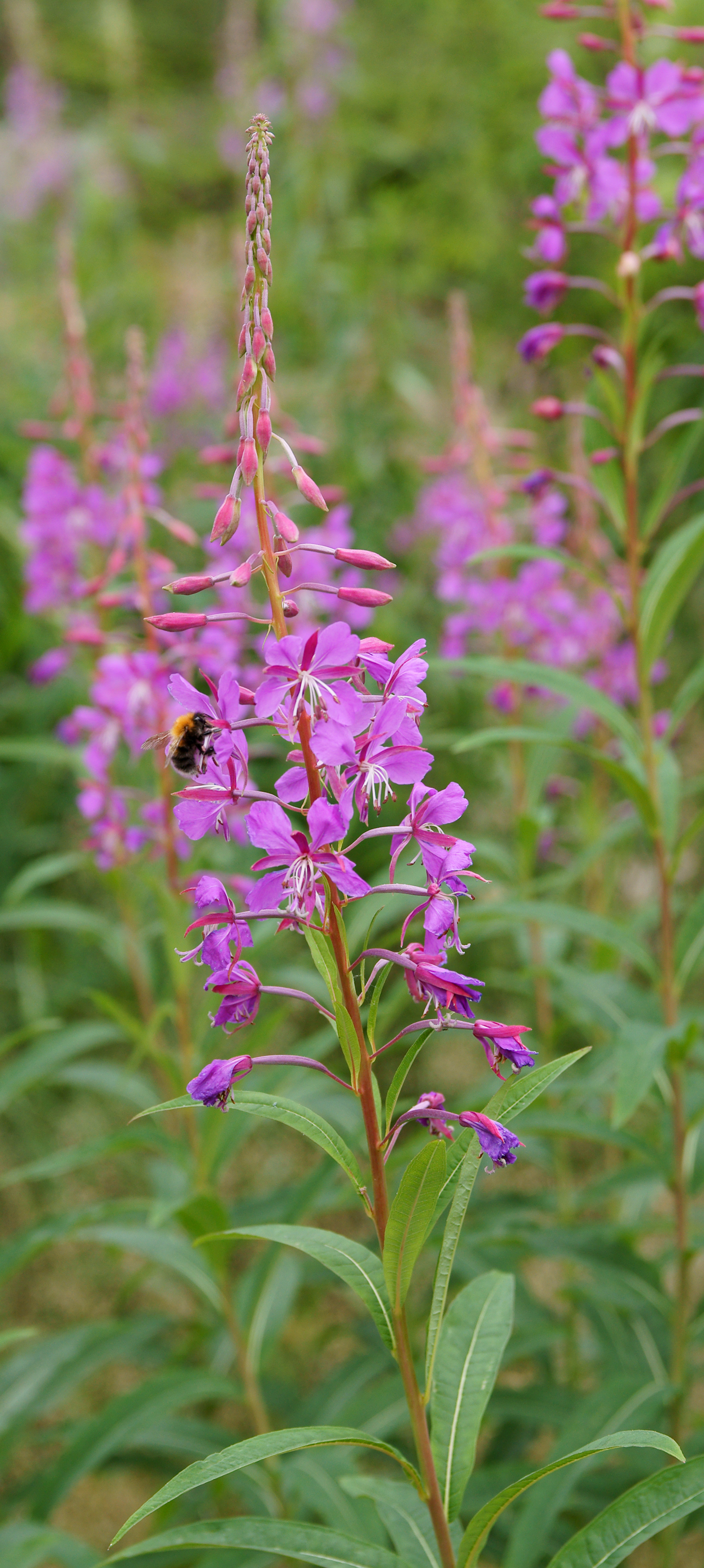

Conservation status
- Secure (NatureServe)

Scientific classification
- Kingdom: Plantae
- Clade: Tracheophytes
- Clade: Angiosperms
- Clade: Eudicots
- Clade: Rosids
- Order: Myrtales
- Family: Onagraceae
- Genus: Chamaenerion
- Species: C. angustifolium

Binomial name
- Chamaenerion angustifolium (L.) Scop.

Synonyms
- Epilobium angustifolium L.; Chamerion angustifolium (L.) Holub

= Chamaenerion angustifolium =

Species of flowering plant

Chamaenerion angustifolium is a perennial herbaceous flowering plant in the willowherb family, Onagraceae. It is known in North America as fireweed and in the British Isles as both fireweed and rosebay willowherb. It is also known by the taxonomic synonyms Chamerion angustifolium and Epilobium angustifolium. It is native throughout the temperate Northern Hemisphere, including large parts of the boreal forests.

== Description ==
The reddish stems of this herbaceous perennial are usually simple, erect, smooth, 0.5–2 metres (1 1/2–6 1/2 feet) high with scattered alternate leaves. The leaves are spirally arranged, entire, narrowly lanceolate, and pinnately veined, the secondary leaf veins anastomosing, joining together to form a continuous marginal vein just inside the leaf margins.

The inflorescence is a symmetrical terminal raceme that blooms progressively from bottom to top, producing a gracefully tapered shape. The flowers are 2 to 3 centimetres (3/4 to 1 1/4 inches) in diameter, slightly asymmetrical, with four magenta to pink petals and four narrower pink sepals behind. The protruding style has four stigmas. The floral formula is ✶/↓ K4 C4 A4+4 or 4+0 Ğ(4).

The upright, reddish-brown linear seed capsule splits from the apex and curls open. It bears many minute brown seeds, about 300 to 400 per capsule and 80,000 per plant. The seeds have silky hairs to aid wind dispersal and are very easily spread by the wind, often becoming a weed and a dominant species on disturbed ground. Once established, the plants also spread extensively by underground roots, an individual plant eventually forming a large patch.

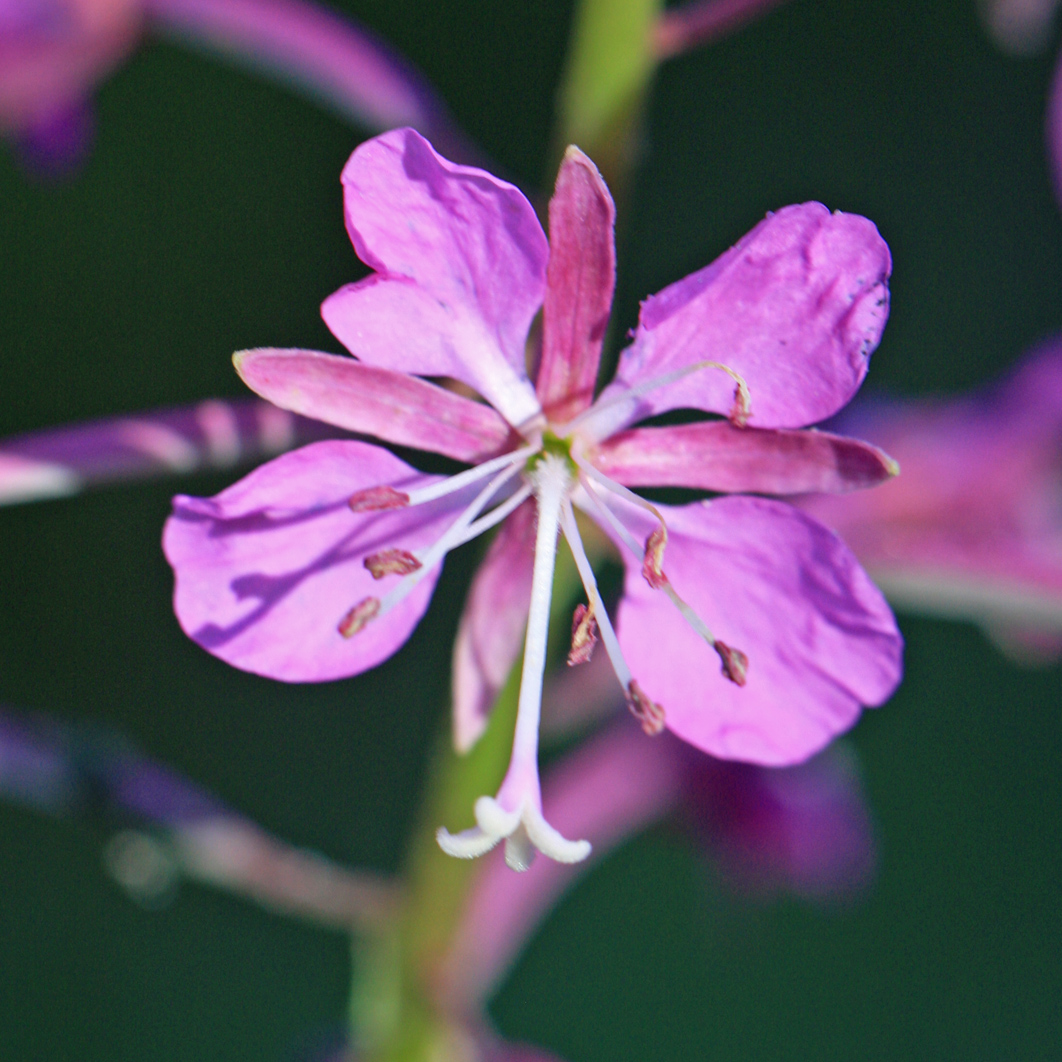
Close-up of flower

Seed capsule splits from the apex and bursts open when squeezed gently at the tip

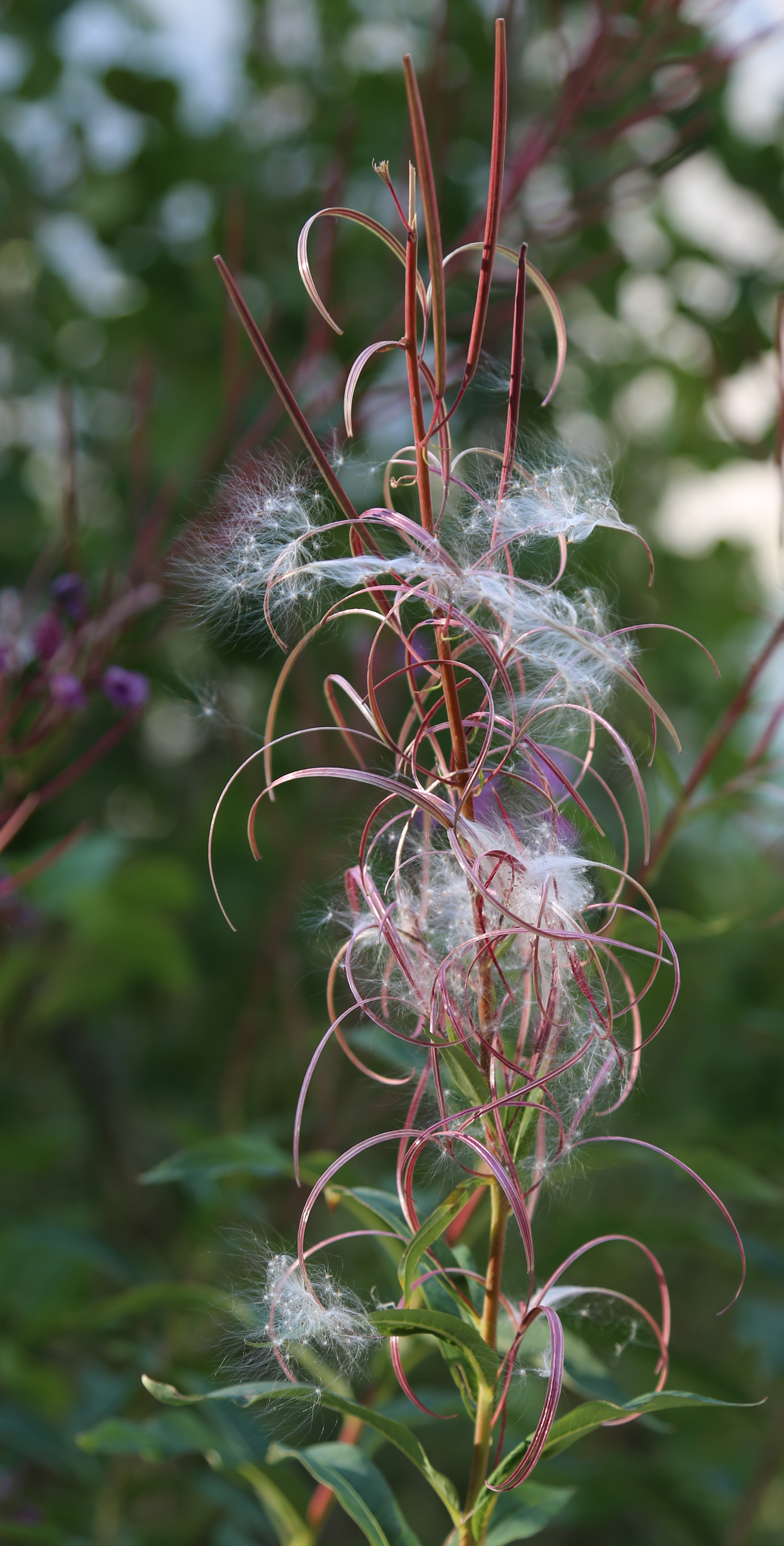
Capsule and seed stage

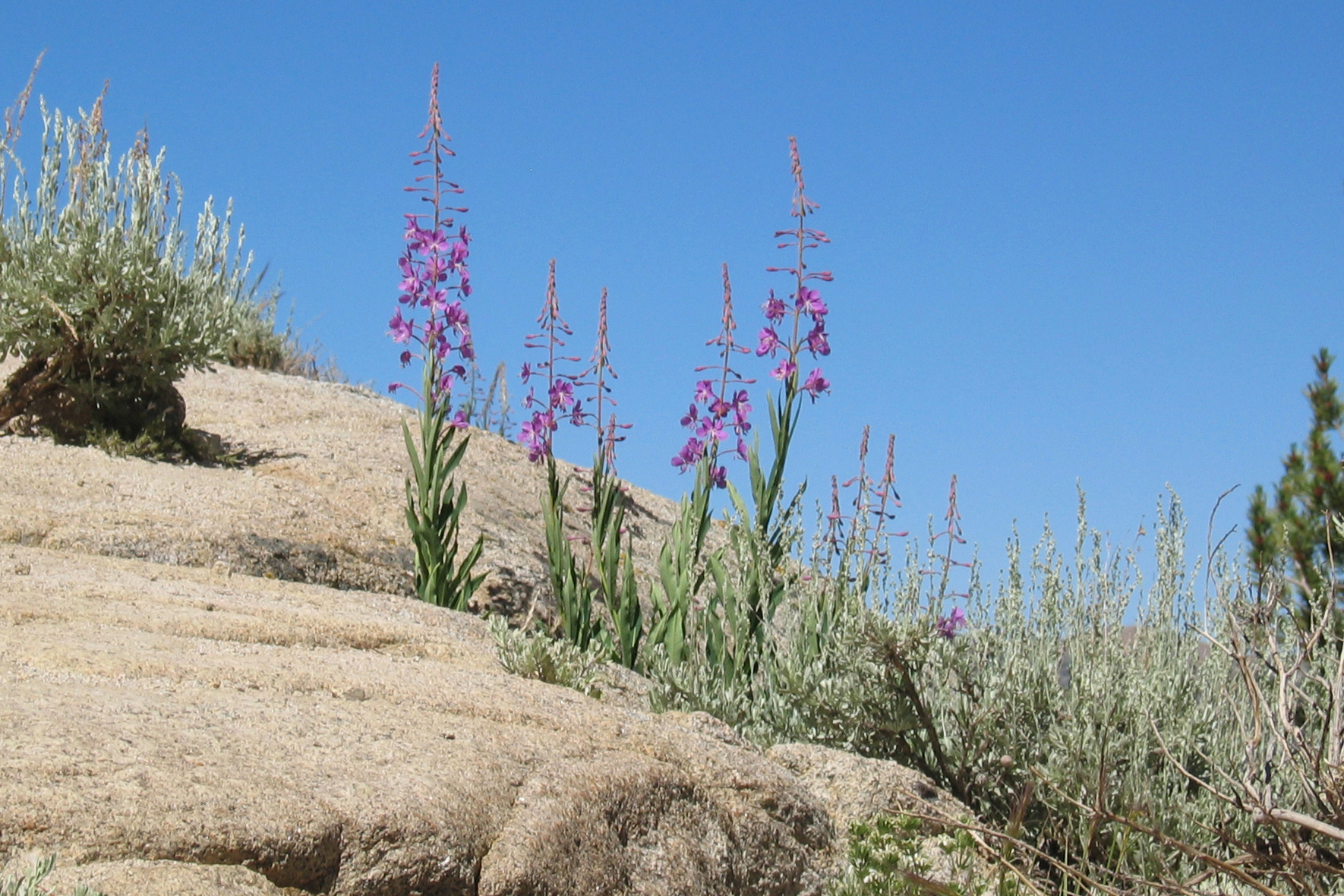
Growing on granite

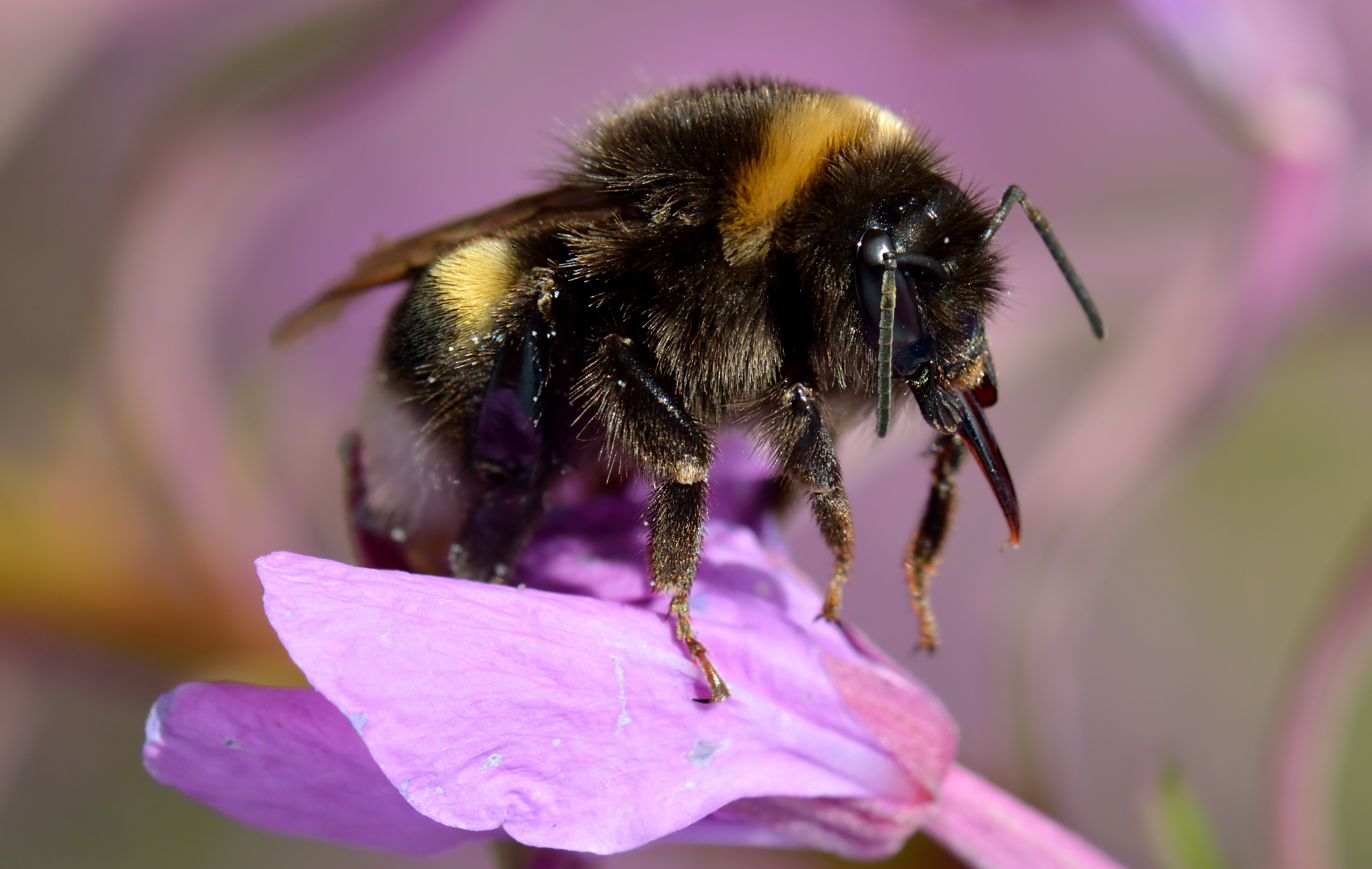
White-tailed bumblebee on a flower

== Taxonomy ==
This species has been placed in the genus Chamaenerion (sometimes given as Chamerion) rather than Epilobium based on several morphological distinctions: spiral (rather than opposite or whorled) leaf arrangement; absence (rather than presence) of a hypanthium; subequal stamens (rather than stamens in two unequal whorls); zygomorphic (rather than actinomorphic) stamens and stigma. Under this taxonomic arrangement, Chamaenerion and Epilobium are monophyletic sister genera.

Two subspecies are recognized as valid:

- Chamaenerion angustifolium subsp. angustifolium
- Chamaenerion angustifolium subsp. circumvagum (Mosquin) Hoch

=== Etymology ===
The generic name Chamaenerion means "dwarf rosebay" in allusion to the outward similarity to rosebay, Nerium oleander, while the specific epithet angustifolium means "narrow-leaved". It is commonly known in Britain as "rosebay willowherb", for the same reason. The common American name "fireweed" derives from the species' abundance as a colonizer on burnt sites after forest fires and other disturbances.

== Distribution and habitat ==
This plant is found throughout the northern hemisphere, from 30 to 68 °F (−1 to 20 °C), but is most common in temperate climates. The species is present in the Pannonian macroregion, confirmed with herbarium specimens.

== Ecology ==
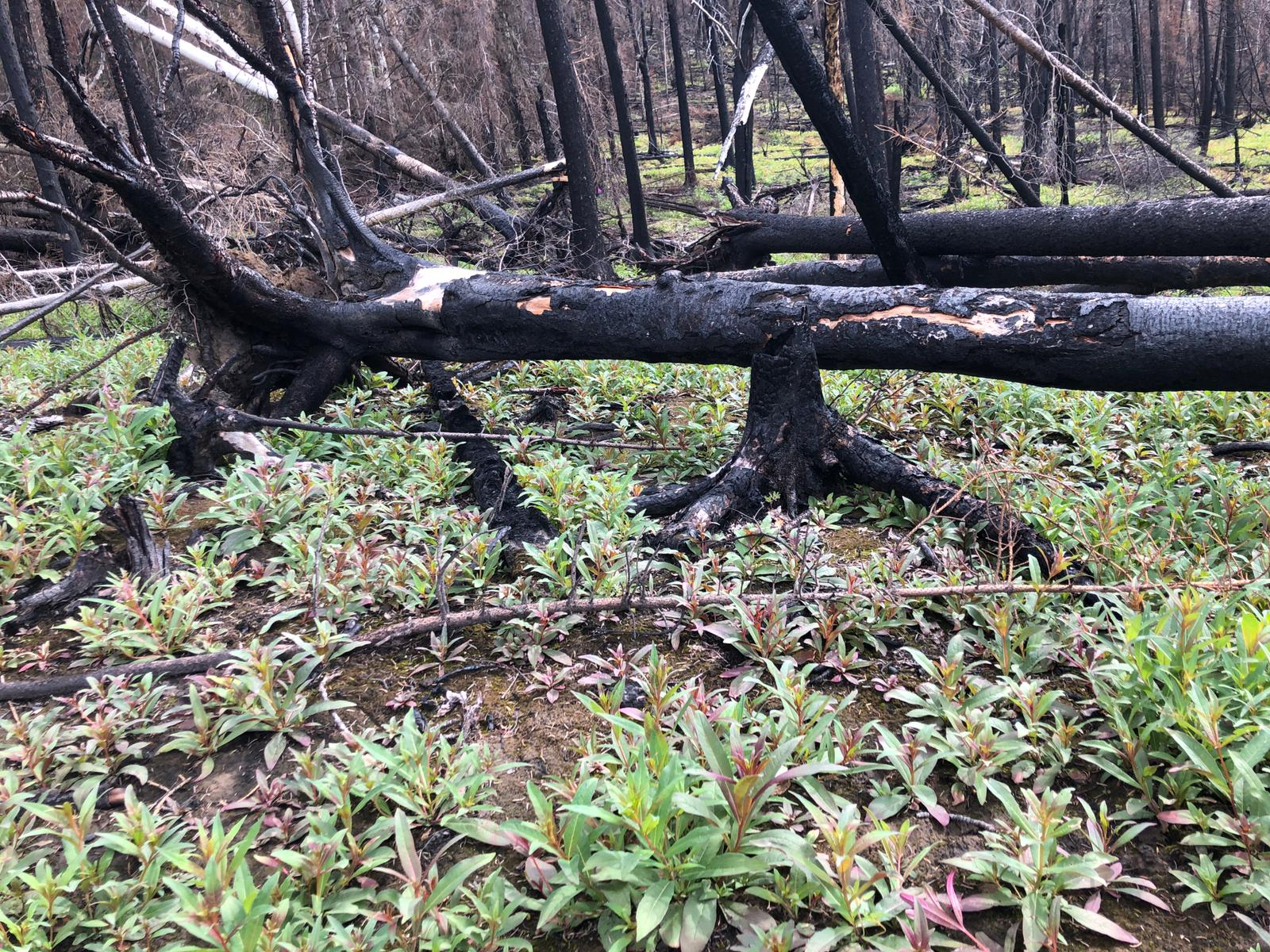
C. angustifolium dominating the forest floor about one year after the 2019 Swan Lake Fire

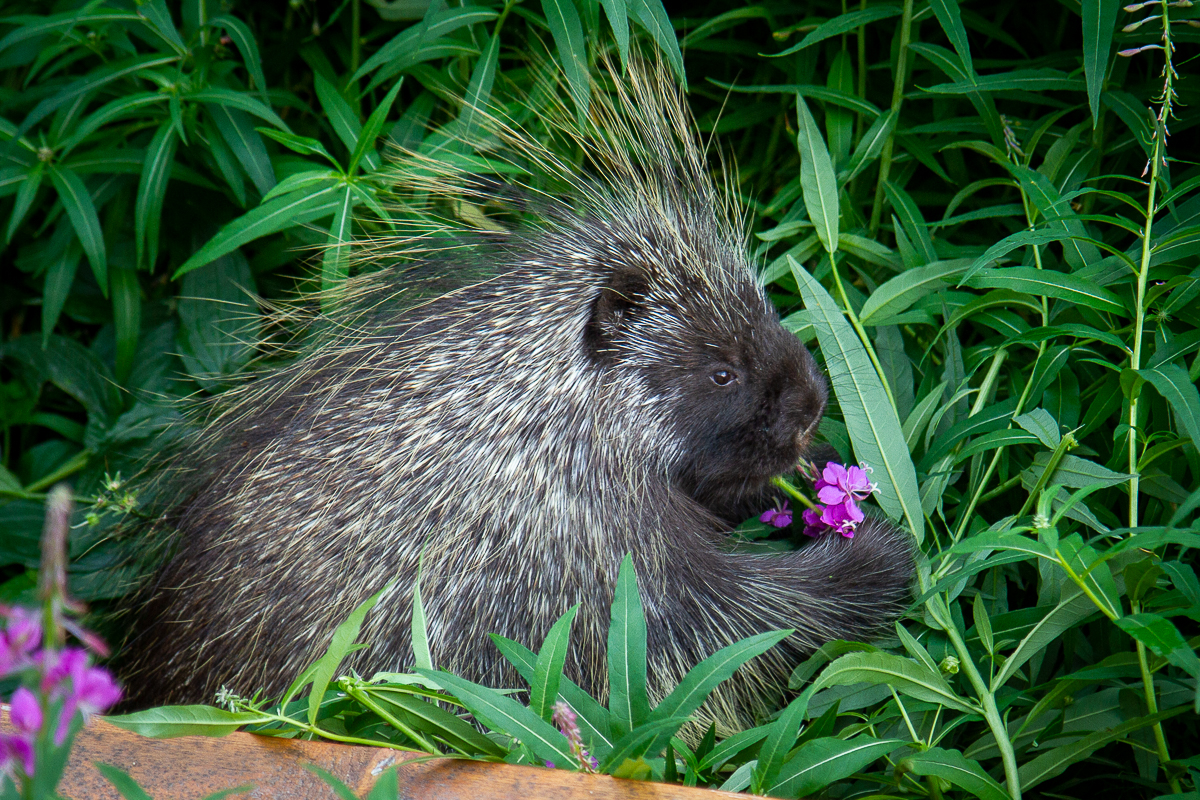
Porcupine eating fireweed in Alaska

Fireweed is often abundant in wet calcareous to slightly acidic soils in open fields, pastures, and particularly burned-over lands. It is a pioneer species that quickly colonizes open areas with little competition, such as the sites of volcanos, forest fires and forest clearings. Plants grow and flower as long as there is open space and plenty of light. Fireweed reaches its average peak colonization after five years and then begins to be replaced as trees and brush grow larger. When a new fire or other disturbance occurs that opens up the ground to light again, the seeds germinate. Some areas with heavy seed counts in the soil can, after burning, be covered with pure dense stands of this species and when in flower the landscape is turned into fields of color.

Fireweed is an effective colonizer; it may not be present until after a fire has moved through a landscape. Because of its very high dispersal capacity, "propagule pressure" from its regional presence will let it quickly colonize a disturbed area. Once seedlings are established, the plant quickly reproduces and covers the disturbed area via seeds and rhizomes. It is somewhat adapted to fire as well and so can prevent the reintroduction of fire to the landscape. Fireweed is well adapted to seed in severely burned areas as well, because the mineral soil that is exposed due to the removal of organic soil layers provides a good seedbed.

In Britain the plant was considered a rare species in the 18th century, and one confined to a few locations with damp, gravelly soils. It was misidentified as great hairy willowherb in contemporary floras. The plant's rise from local rarity to widespread abundance seems to have occurred at the same time as the expansion of the railway network and the associated soil disturbance. The plant became locally known as 'bombweed' due to its rapid colonization of bomb craters during World War II.

Bears and elk are known to favor the plant as food.

=== Pollination ===
The flowers are visited by a wide variety of insects (the generalised pollination syndrome). Some species in the insect order Lepidoptera frequently use the willowherb as their primary larval host-plant, examples including the elephant hawk moth (Deilephila elpenor), bedstraw hawk moth (Hyles gallii), and the white-lined sphinx moth (Hyles lineata).

== Uses ==
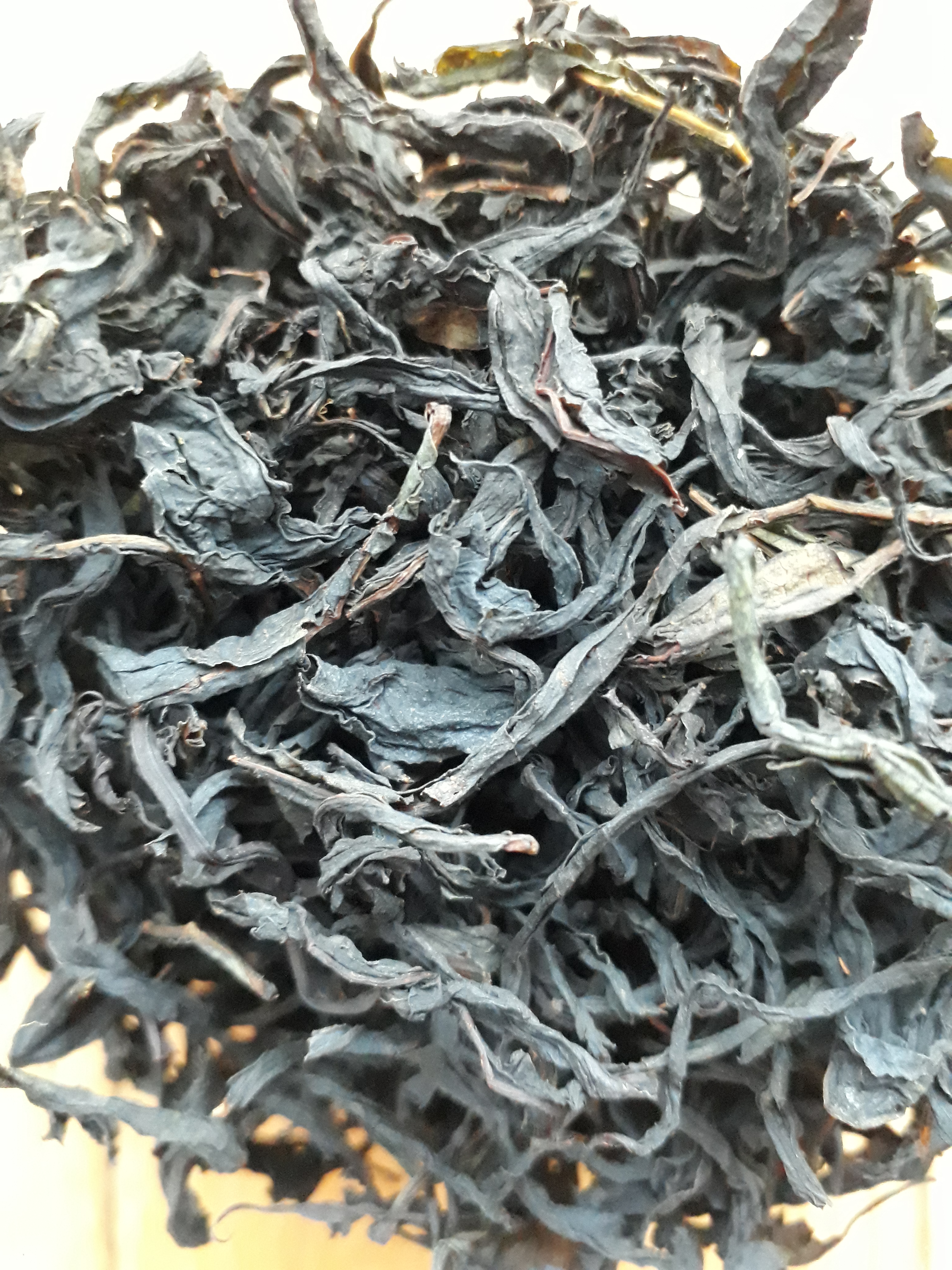
Leaves used as fermented tea

The plant is not considered palatable, but the young shoots and leaves can be cooked and eaten. Fresh leaves can be eaten raw. The young flowers are also edible (being made into jelly in the Yukon) and the stems of older plants can be split to extract the edible raw pith. The root can be roasted after scraping off the outside, but often tastes bitter. To mitigate this, the root is collected before the plant flowers and the brown thread in the middle removed. The stem centers can also be prepared by splitting the outer stalk, and eaten raw.

Traditionally the young shoots are collected in the spring by Native American and Siberian people and mixed with other greens. As the plant matures, the leaves become tough and somewhat bitter. Fireweed petals are made into jelly, and mature leaves are dried for use as tea. Roots are traditionally eaten raw by Siberian Native people. The Denaʼina add fireweed to their dogs' food. The Nlaka'pamux use the blooming of fireweed as a temporal indicator that mule deers have just given birth, meaning it is a good time to hunt for them.

The leaves can be used to make tea. In Russia, fireweed is made into a tea known as Ivan-Chai (Ivan-Tea) or Koporsky tea (from the town of Koporye, where it has been produced since the 13th century). The popularity of fireweed tea perhaps stems from the similarity of its production to that of common black tea (Camellia sinensis), leading to a richly flavoured and deeply coloured herbal tea, with no caffeine. It is commercially sold in a blend with mint or thyme.

The honey produced from fireweed is highly valued for its quality. Most fireweed honey is produced in locations in cool climates, such as the Pacific Northwest in the United States and Scandinavian countries in Europe.

Fireweed's natural variation in ploidy has prompted its use in scientific studies of the possible effects of polyploidy on adaptive potential and species diversification.

Because fireweed can colonize disturbed sites, even following an old oil spill, it is often used to re-establish vegetation.

It is also grown as an ornamental plant. A white form, C. angustifolium 'Album', is listed by the Royal Horticultural Society.

=== Land management ===
Because of its rapid establishment on disturbed land, fireweed can be used for land management purposes. Events such as logging, fires and mass wasting can leave the land barren and without vegetation. This causes the land to be more susceptible to erosion because of the lack of root structure in the soil. Fireweed is a useful tool that can be utilized after prescribed fires and logging events because of its fire resistance and ability to recycle the nutrients left in the soil after a fire. It is also able to quickly establish a root system for reproduction and through this can prevent mass wasting and erosion events from occurring on burned or logged hillsides. Reestablishment of vegetation is crucial in the recovery time of disturbed lands. In many cases, fireweed establishes itself on these disturbed lands, but implementing the introduction of fireweed to a disturbed area as a management practice could prove useful in speeding up the recovery of disturbed lands. Disturbed and burned over lands are generally unpleasant to look at and pose a risk to habitats and nearby communities because of their susceptibility to mass wasting events. Fireweed can quickly establish itself across the landscape and prevent further damage, while providing a blanket of vegetation for recovering fauna to create new habitats in and for pollinators to foster the re-establishment of a diverse set of flora.

== In culture ==
The Flag of Yukon features fireweed.

Fireweed has been referred to in poetry and prose since at least the 19th century. Rudyard Kipling wrote, "The fire-weed glows in the centre of the drive ways". In The Fellowship of the Ring (1954), J. R. R. Tolkien lists fireweed as one of the flowering plants returning to the site of a bonfire inside the Old Forest.

As the first plant to colonise waste ground, fireweed is often mentioned in postwar British literature. The children's novel Fireweed by Jill Paton Walsh is set during the Blitz and features two runaway teenagers who meet on bomb sites where fireweed is growing profusely. Another children's novel, A Reflection of Rachel features a protagonist attempting to restore an old garden that used "Rose Pink Willow Herb" as an ornamental plant and mentions its notoriety for growing on abandoned bomb sites. As such, it was also referred to as "bombweed". Cicely Mary Barker's 1948 book Flower Fairies of the Wayside included an illustration of 'The Rose-Bay Willow-Herb Fairy', with the accompanying verse "On the breeze my fluff is blown; So my airy seeds are sown. Where the earth is burnt and sad, I will come to make it glad. All forlorn and ruined places, All neglected empty spaces, I can cover—only think!— With a mass of rosy pink."

Rosebay Willowherb was voted the county flower of London in 2002 following a poll by the wild plant conservation charity Plantlife. Fireweed is the floral emblem of Yukon.

Several songs have been made in Finland about Chamaenerion angustifolium. But one of the well-known is Rentun Ruusu from 1988, which was written by lyricist Vexi Salmi and composed by Irwin Goodman.
