= Rock Rabbit Lakes =

Lake in Washington (state)

Rock Rabbit Lake
- Location within Washington (state) Location within the United States
- Location: Kittitas County, Washington, United States
- Coordinates: 47.3711°N 121.3238°W
- Basin countries: United States
- Surface area: 4.2 acres (0.017 km^{2})
- Surface elevation: 4,190 ft (1,280 m)

Rock Rabbit Lakes are two small freshwater lakes located within the Alpine Lakes Wilderness in a valley on the northern slope of Keechelus Ridge between Keechelus Lake and Kachess Lake in Kittitas County, Washington, United States. Because of its close proximity to Rampart Ridge, Interstate 90 and several cirque on both sides of Keechelus Ridge, the lake is a common area for hiking, swimming, and fishing rainbow trout. Keechelus Ridge is accessed through trail 4934 which covers the length of the ridge. A short distance north is Swan Lake, Stonethrow Lake, and Margaret Lake.

== See also ==
- List of lakes of the Alpine Lakes Wilderness
