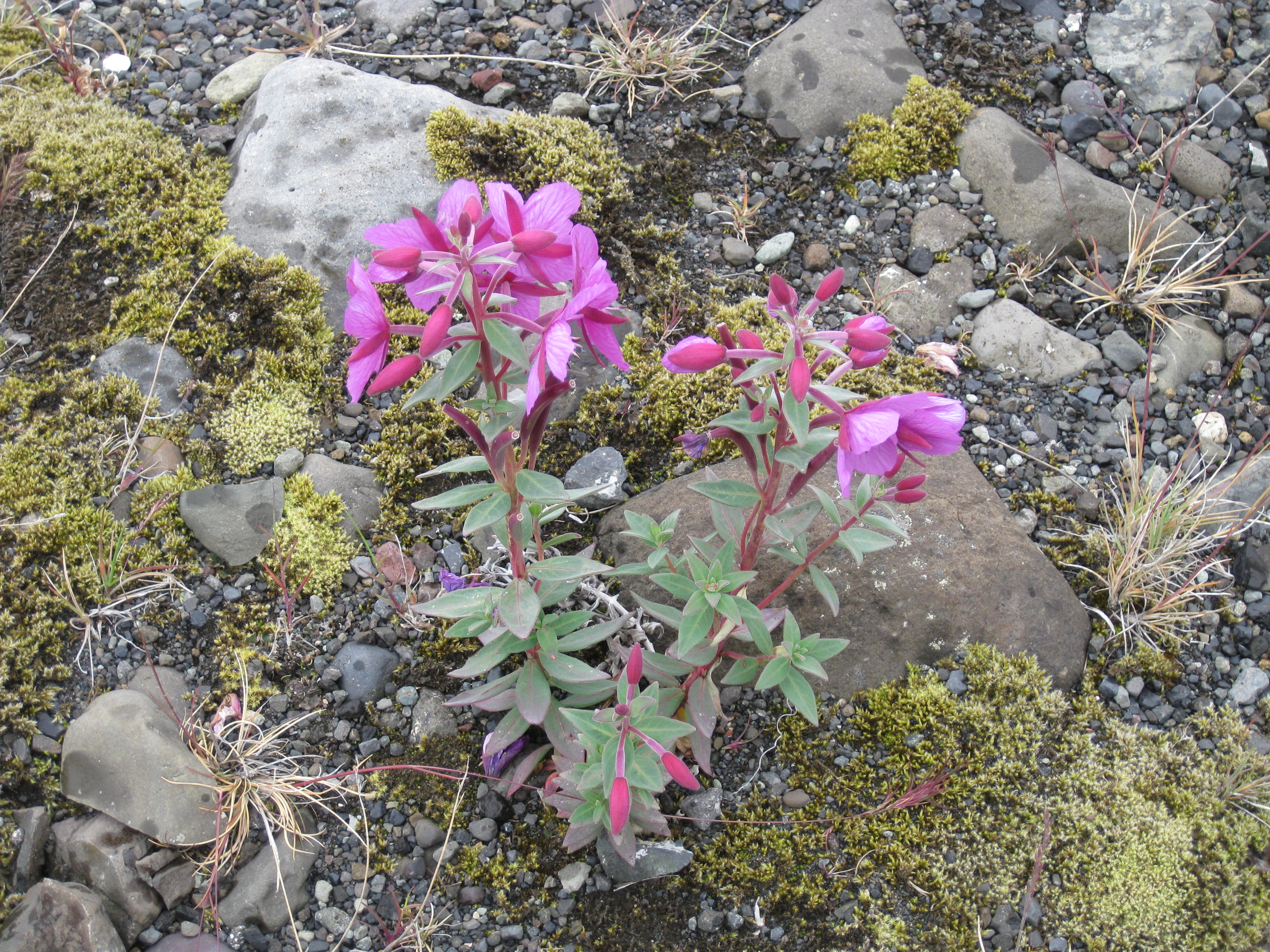

Conservation status
- Secure (NatureServe)

Scientific classification
- Kingdom: Plantae
- Clade: Tracheophytes
- Clade: Angiosperms
- Clade: Eudicots
- Clade: Rosids
- Order: Myrtales
- Family: Onagraceae
- Genus: Chamaenerion
- Species: C. latifolium

Binomial name
- Chamaenerion latifolium (L.) Sweet

Synonyms
- Epilobium latifolium L.; Chamerion latifolium (L.) Holub

= Chamaenerion latifolium =

Plant species in the willowherb family

Chamaenerion latifolium (formerly Epilobium latifolium, also called Chamerion latifolium) is a species of flowering plant in the evening primrose family known by the English common names dwarf fireweed and river beauty willowherb. It has a circumboreal distribution, appearing throughout the northern regions of the Northern Hemisphere, including alpine, sub-Arctic, and Arctic areas such as snowmelt-flooded gravel bars and talus, in a wide range of elevations. This is a perennial herb growing in clumps of leaves variable in size, shape, and texture above a woody caudex. The leaves are 1 to 10 centimeters long, lance-shaped to oval, pointed or rounded at the tips, and hairy to hairless and waxy. The inflorescence is a rough-haired raceme of nodding flowers with bright to deep pink, and occasionally white, petals up to 3 centimeters long. Behind the opened petals are pointed sepals. The fruit is an elongated capsule which may exceed 10 centimeters in length.

In the Arctic, this plant provides valuable nutrition for the Inuit, who eat the leaves raw, boiled with fat, or steeped in water for tea, the flowers and fruits raw, and as a salad with meals of seal and walrus blubber. The leaves and shoots are edible, tasting much like spinach, and is also known in the Canadian tundra as River Beauty.

It is the national flower of Greenland with the Greenlandic name niviarsiaq ("young girl").

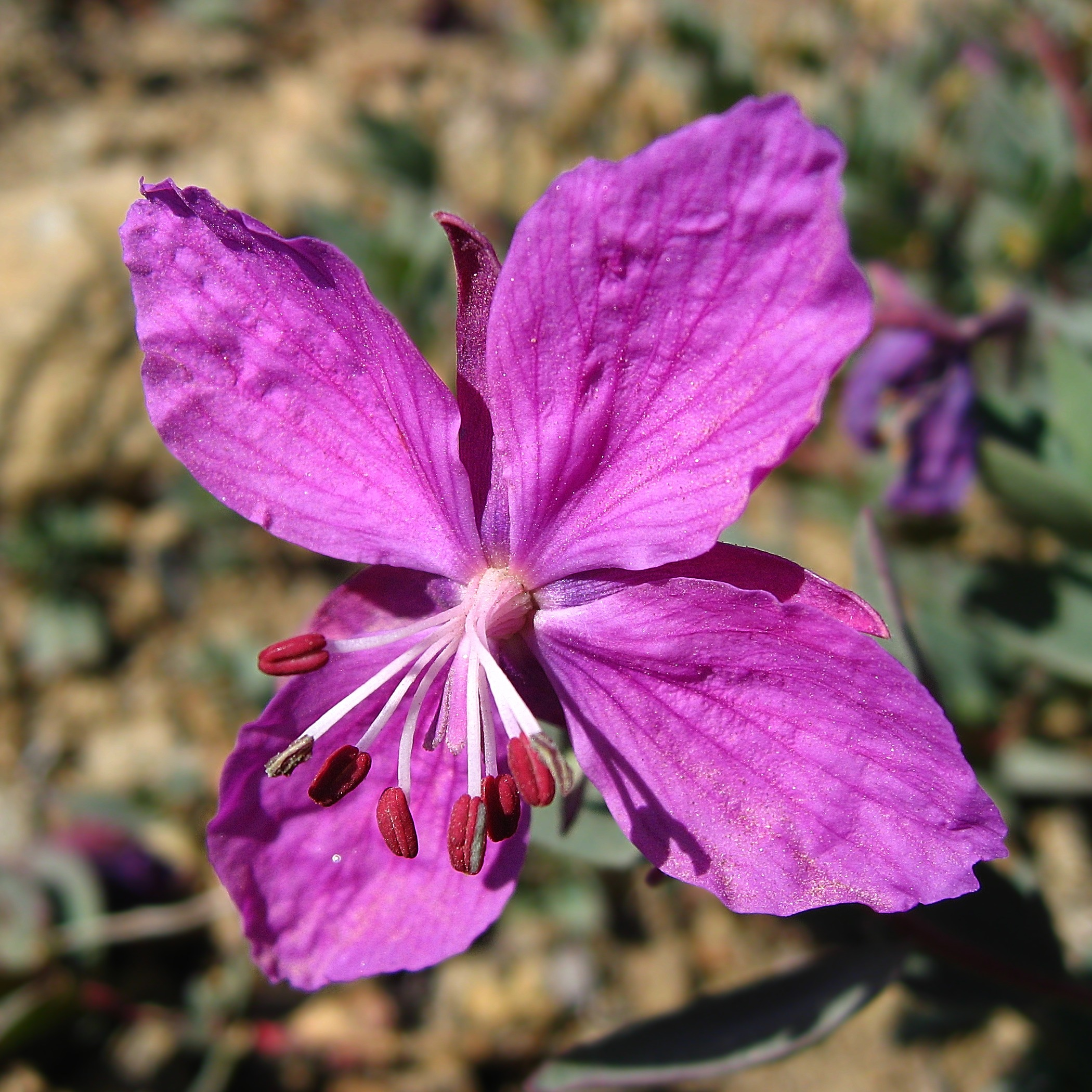
Flower of Chamerion latifolium
