= Willowherb =

Willowherbs are annual or perennial herbaceous plants in the flowering plant family Onagraceae. Willowherb may refer to:

- A species of willowherb in the genus Epilobium
- A species of willowherb in the genus Chamaenerion
