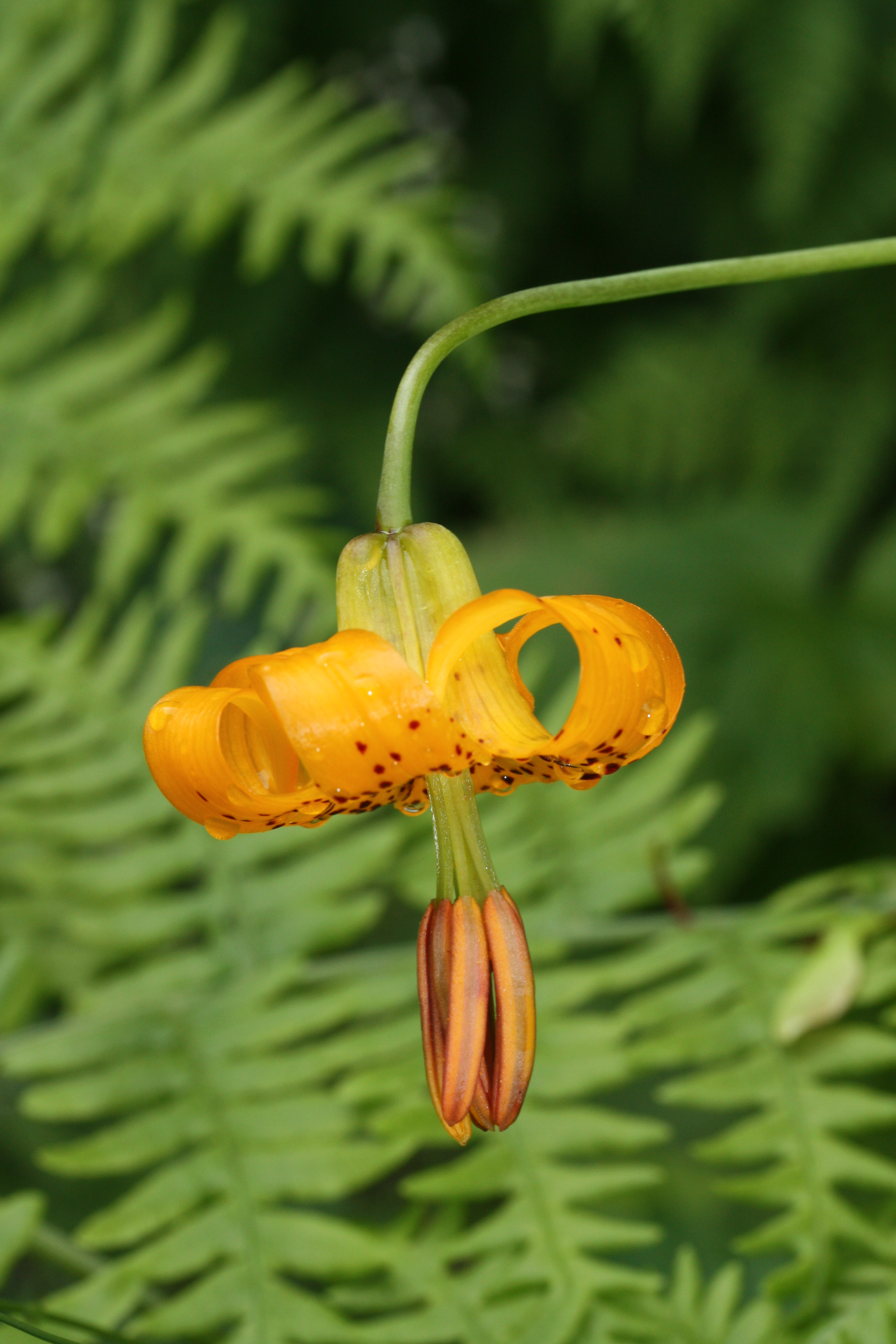
- Mount Baker-Snoqualmie National Forest

Scientific classification
- Kingdom: Plantae
- Clade: Tracheophytes
- Clade: Angiosperms
- Clade: Monocots
- Order: Liliales
- Family: Liliaceae
- Subfamily: Lilioideae
- Tribe: Lilieae
- Genus: Lilium
- Species: L. columbianum

Binomial name
- Lilium columbianum Leichtlin 1871 not Hanson 1874

Synonyms
- Synonymy: Lilium canadense var. minus Alph.Wood; Lilium canadense var. walkeri Alph.Wood; Lilium californicum Duch.; Lilium sayi Nutt. ex Duch.; Lilium canadense var. californicum (Duch.) Bol.; Lilium parviflorum (Hook.) W.G.Sm.; Lilium lucidum Kellogg; Lilium nitidum W.Bull ex Baker; Lilium bakeri Purdy; Lilium purdyi Waugh

= Lilium columbianum =

Species of lily

Lilium columbianum is a lily native to western North America. It is also known as the Columbia lily, Columbia tiger lily, or simply tiger lily (sharing the latter common name with several other lily species in its genus).

== Distribution and habitat ==
Lilium columbianum occurs in lowland and montane forest openings and meadows from southern British Columbia in Canada south to northern California and east to Montana in the northwestern United States. Mostly occurring below 2,000 m (6,600 ft), it usually blooms in June through early August. There are a few isolated populations at high elevations in the Sierra Nevada as far south as Fresno County.

== Description ==
Lilium columbianum is a perennial herb that grows up to 1.2 metres (3.9 ft) tall, and bears from few to numerous orange flowers with darker spots. The tepals are 3 to 6 cm long and the flowers are lightly scented. Like many true lilies, the leaves are arranged in whorls around the stem of the plant.

== Uses ==
=== Food ===
Coast Salish, Nuu-chah-nulth and most western Washington peoples steamed, boiled or pit-cooked its bulbs. Bitter or peppery-tasting, they were mostly used as a flavoring, often in soup with meat or fish.

=== Horticulture ===
From seed, Lilium columbianum requires three to five years to mature. Cultivated bulbs can be divided or bulb scales may be used to generate new plants more quickly.

== Gallery ==
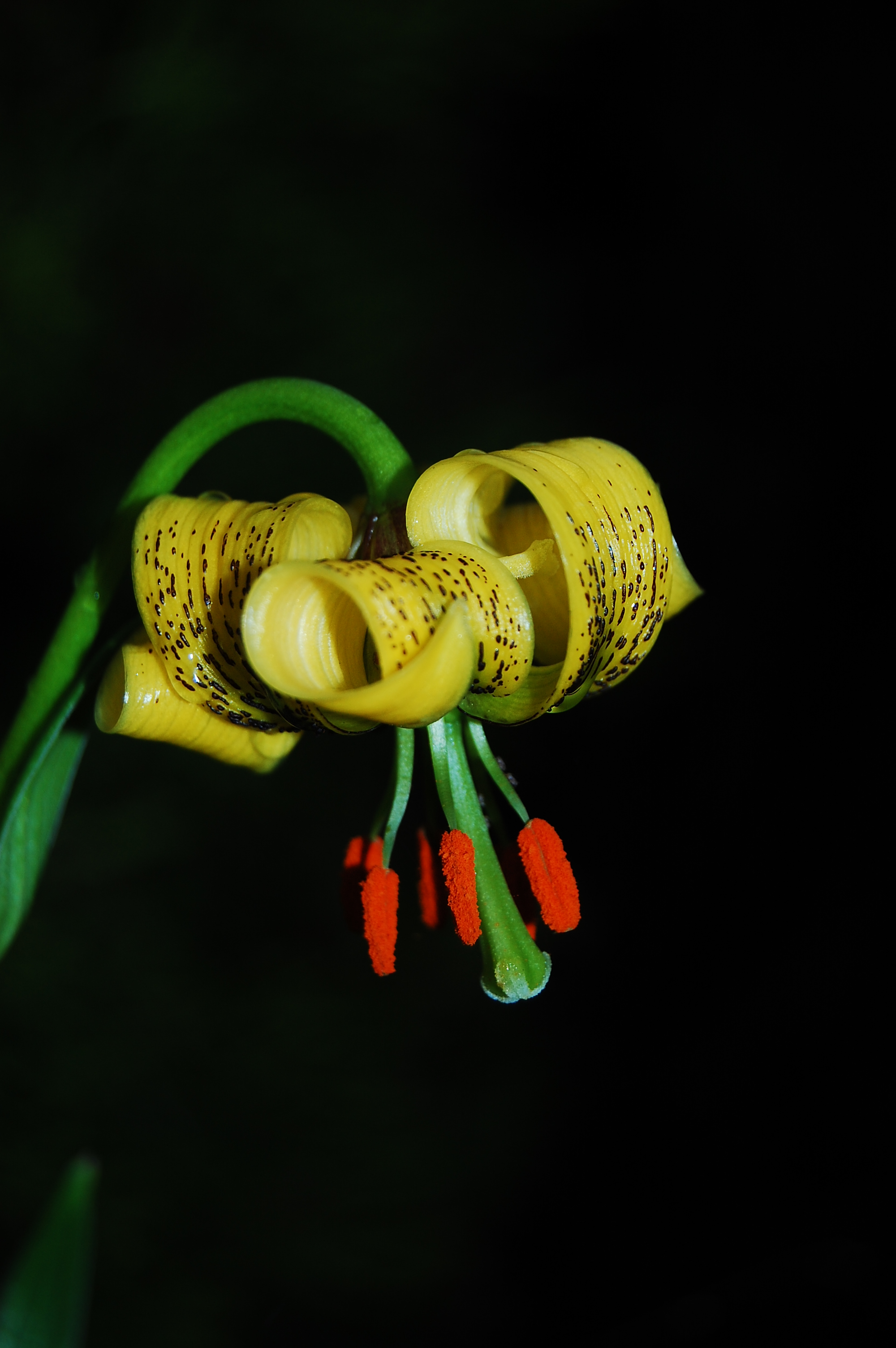
Lilium columbianum flower, from a garden in Scotland.

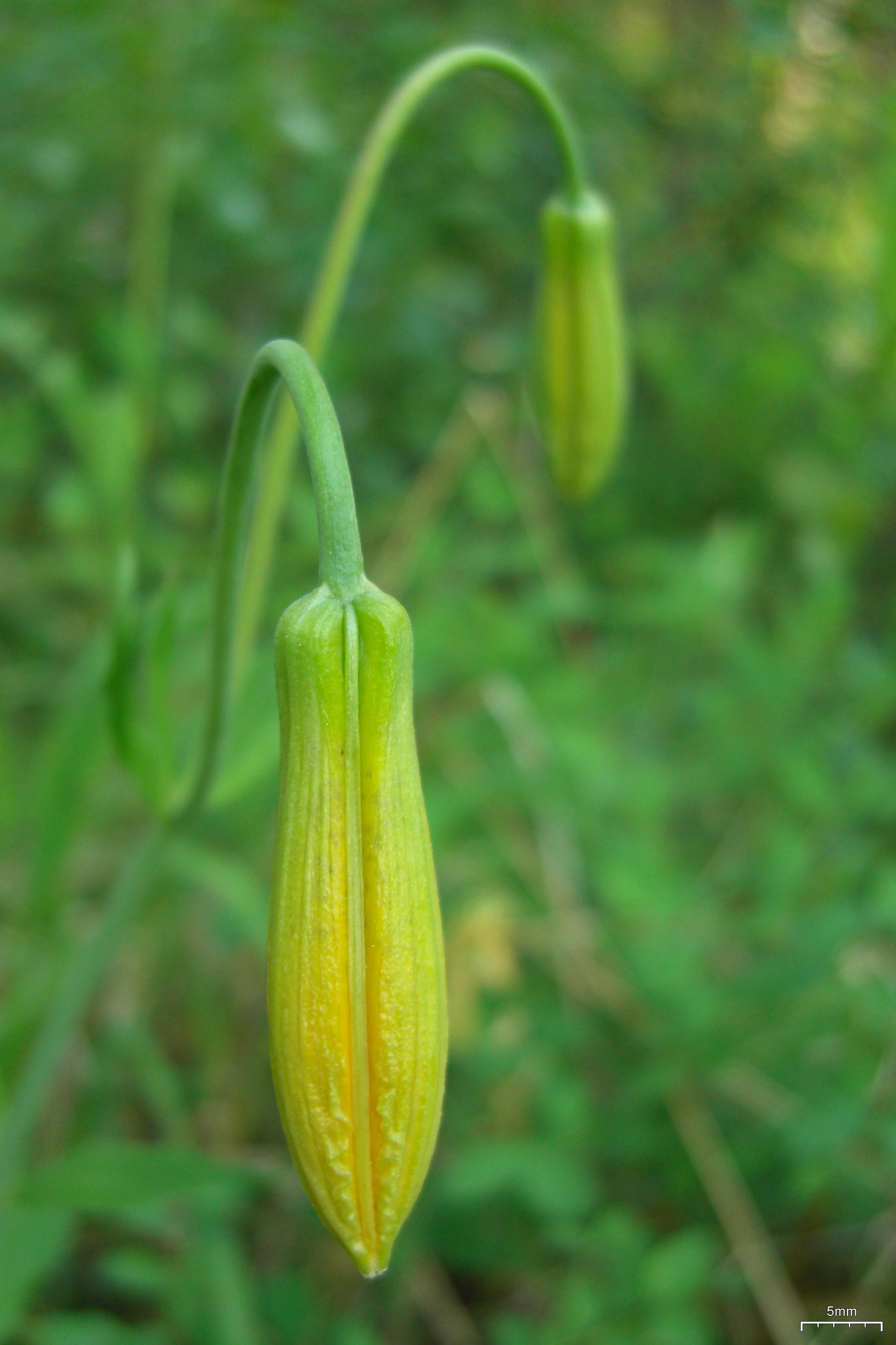
Columbia Lily Buds

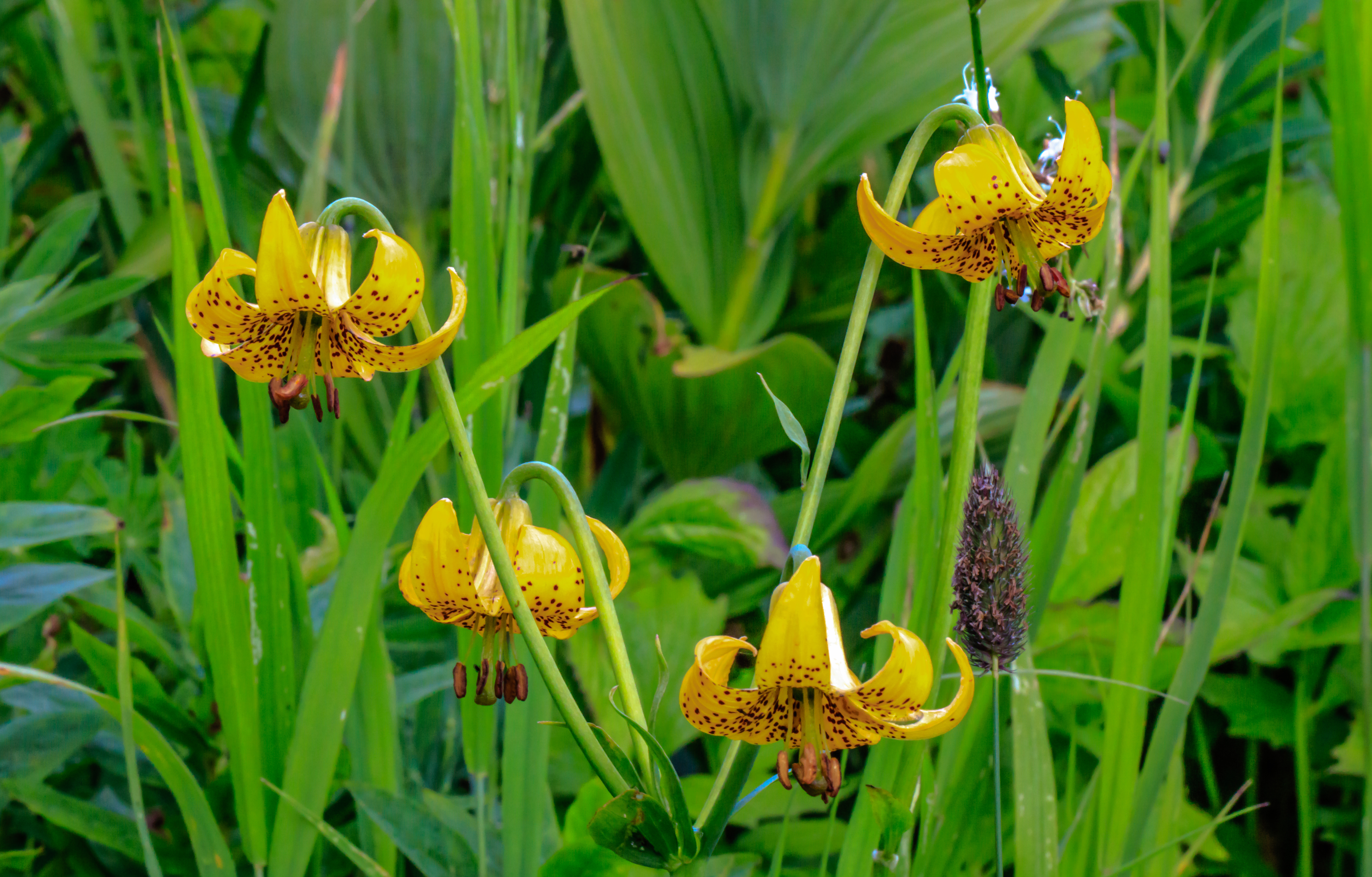

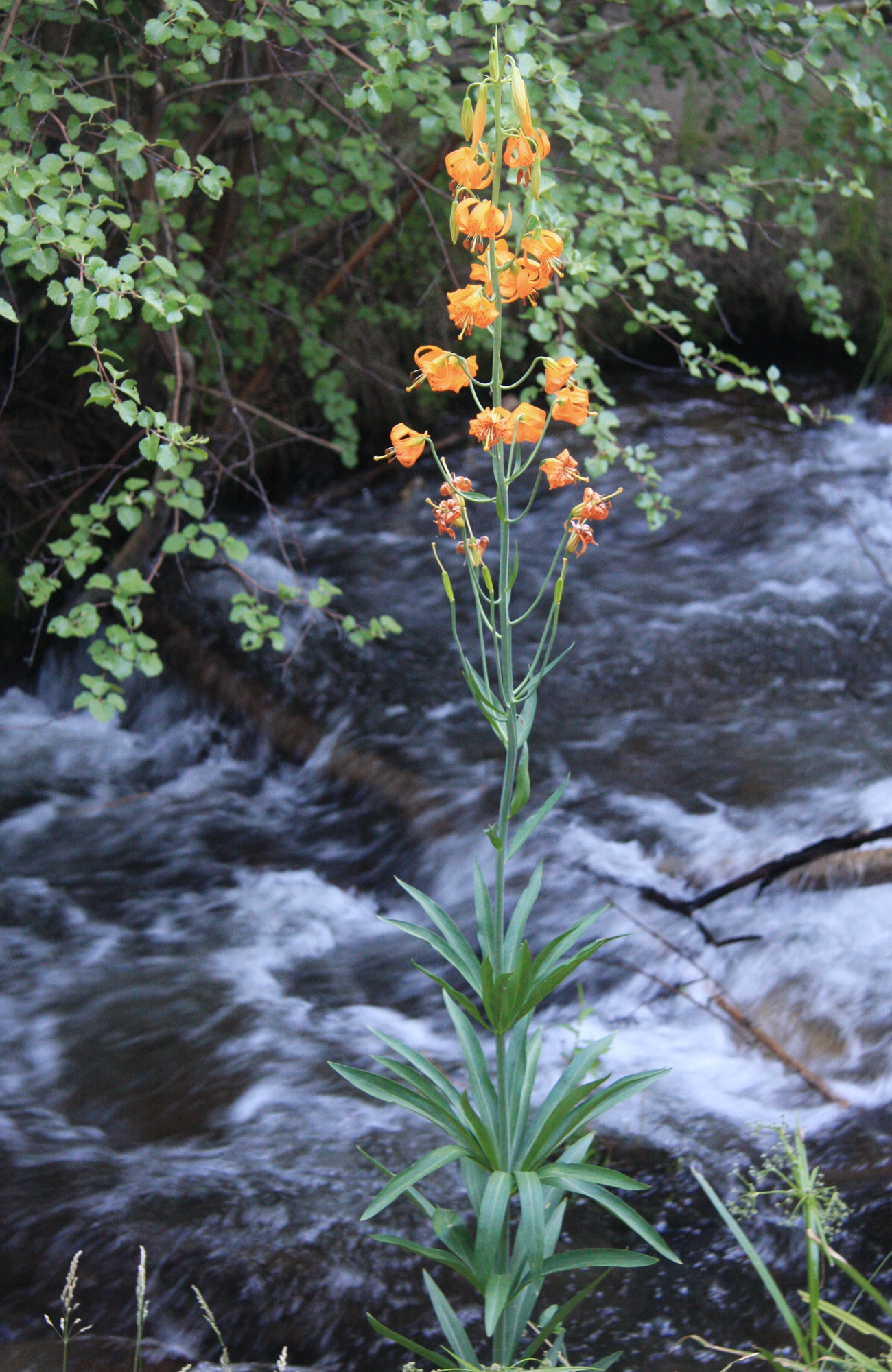
Lilium columbianum by creek

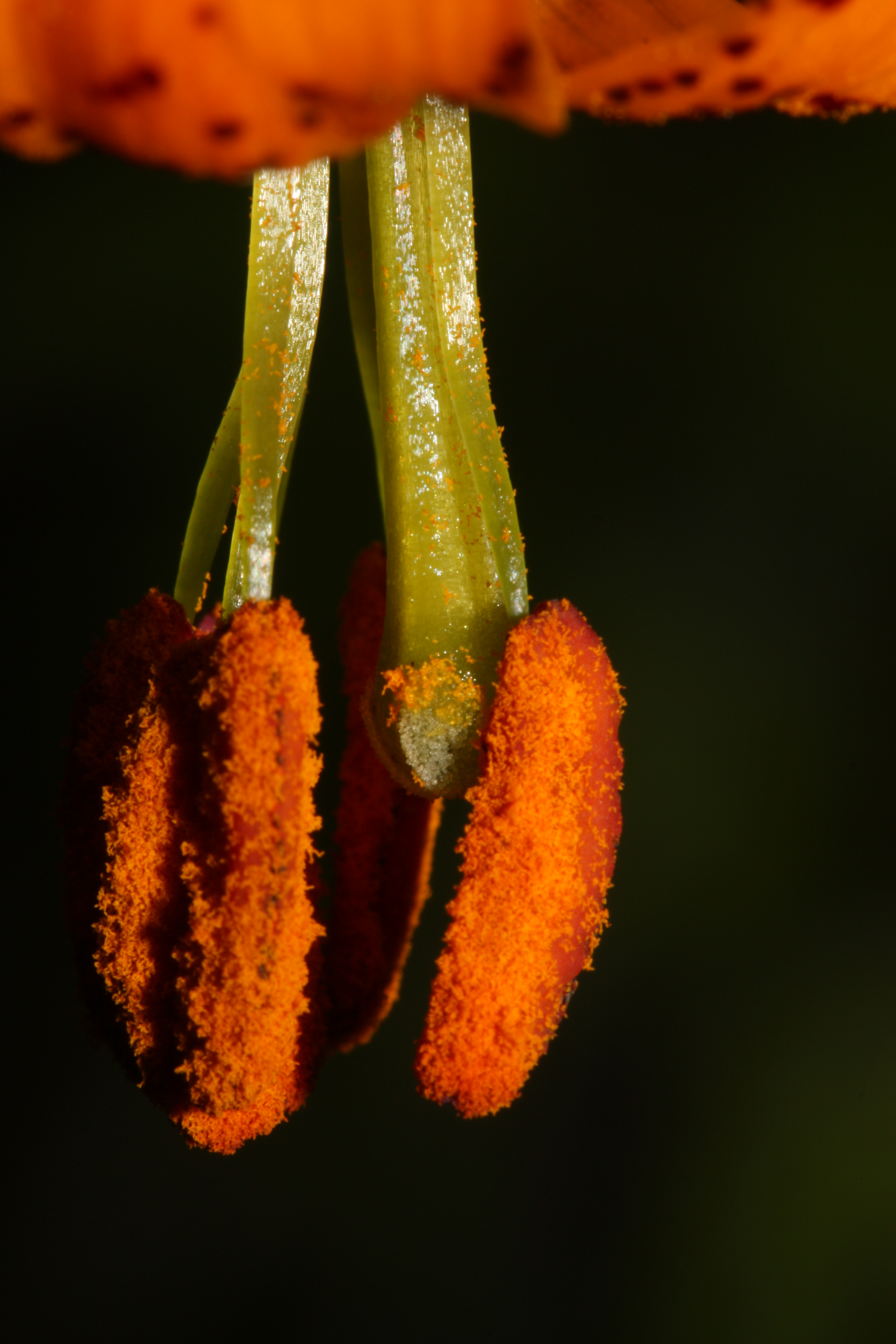
Lilium columbianum anthers

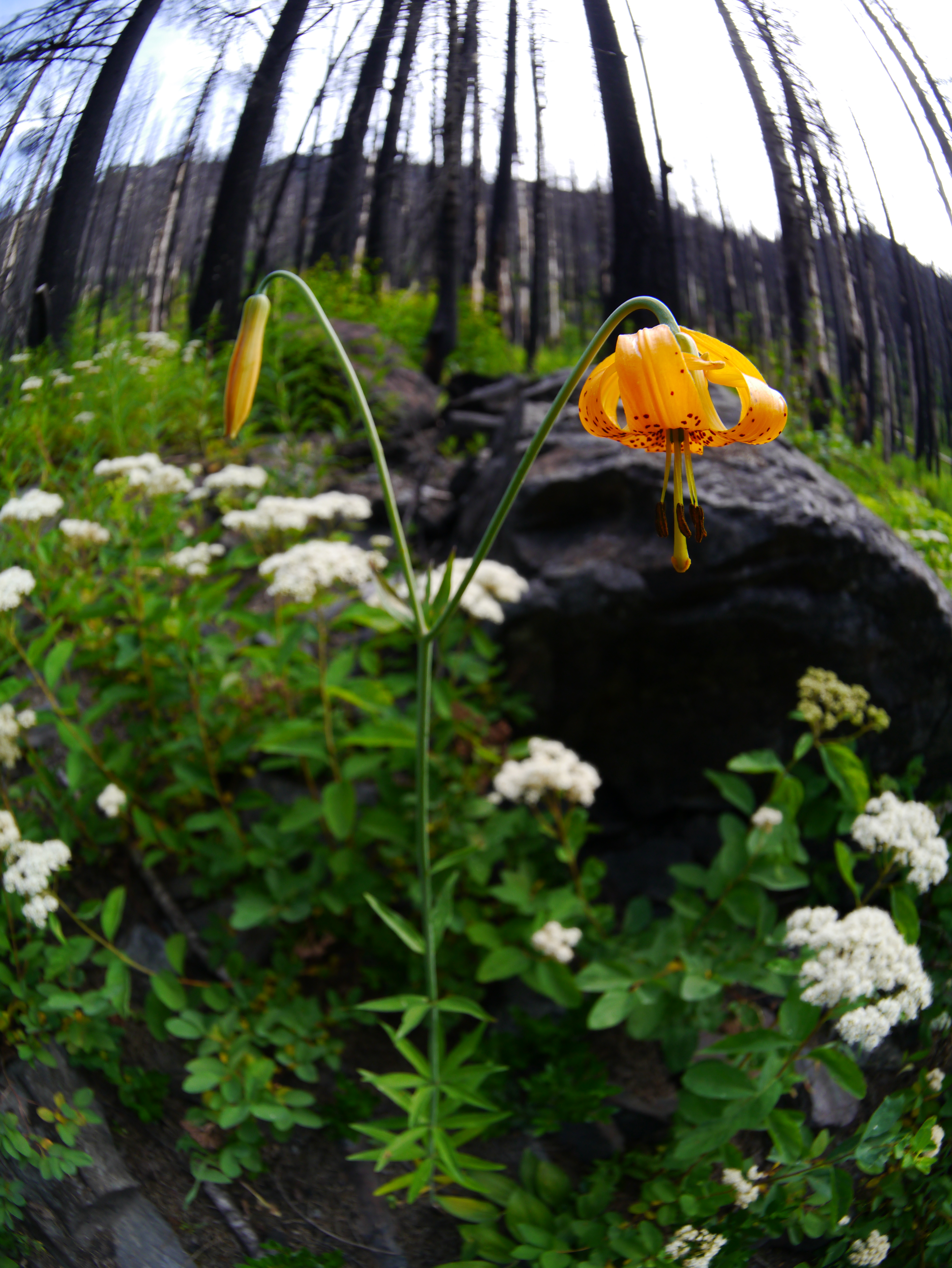
Lilium columbianum in burned area

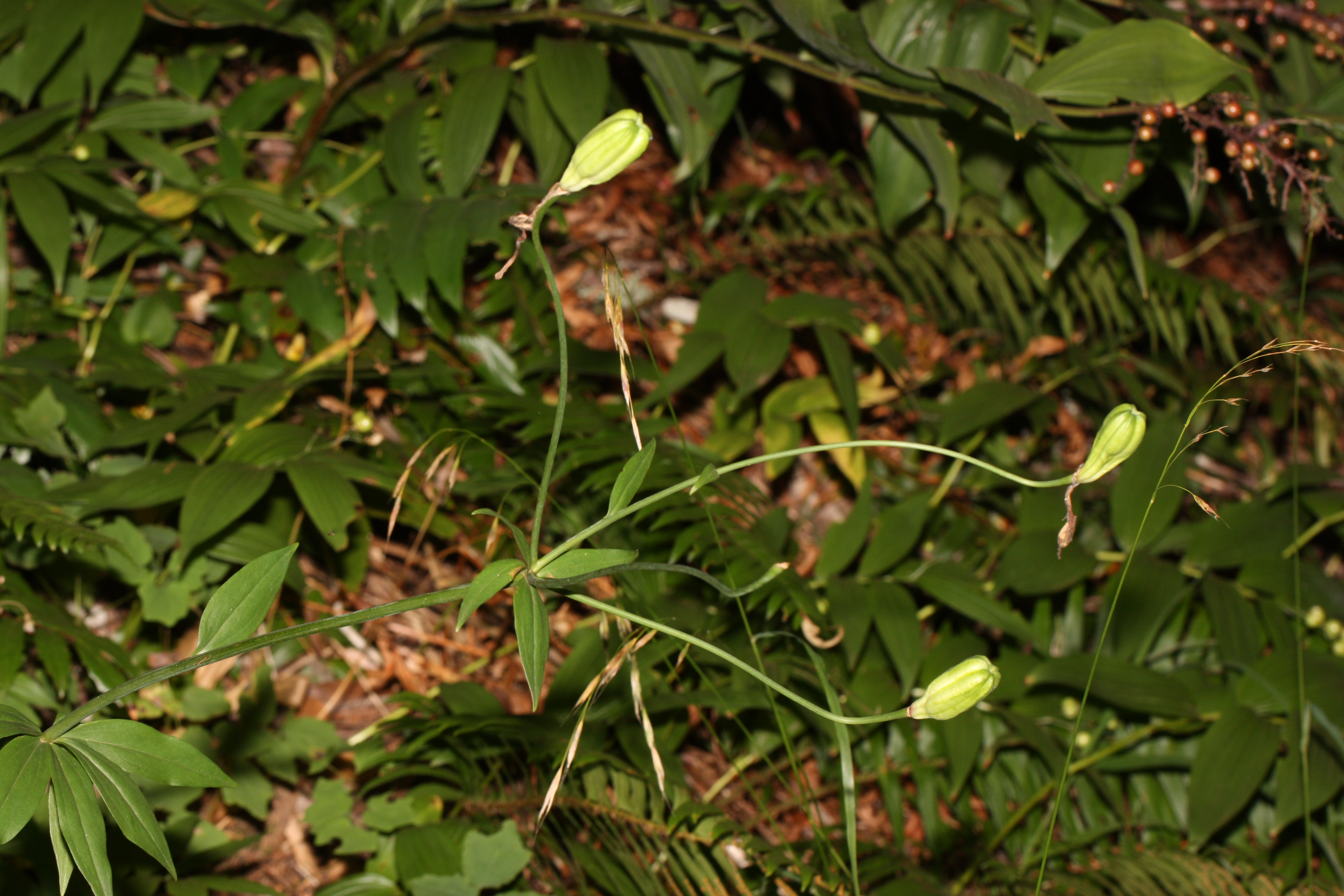
The fruit is an erect capsule that is generally smooth and contains numerous flat seeds in six stacks.

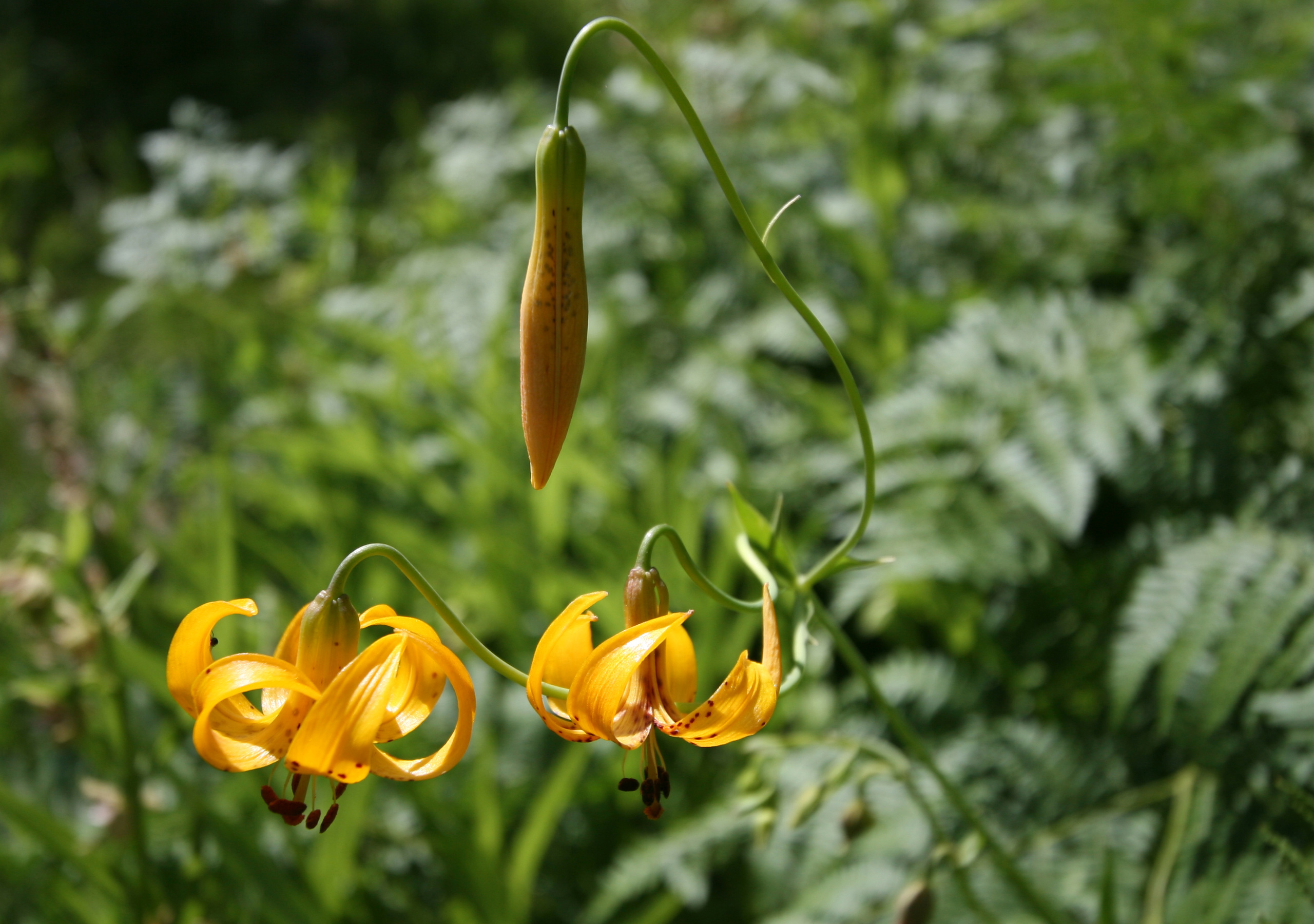
Lilium columbianum bud & flowers, at 7000 ft in Sierra Nevada
