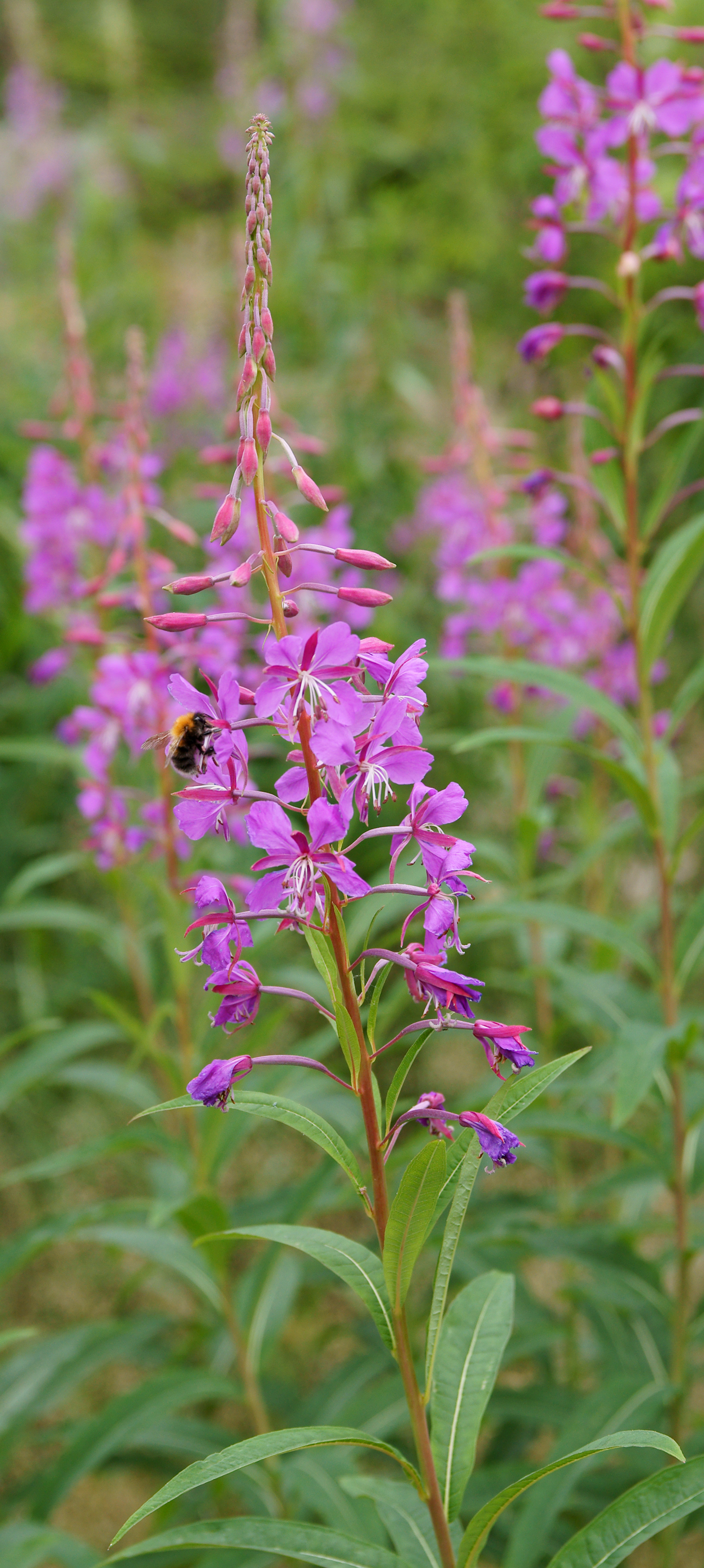
- Chamaenerion angustifolium

Scientific classification
- Kingdom: Plantae
- Clade: Tracheophytes
- Clade: Angiosperms
- Clade: Eudicots
- Clade: Rosids
- Order: Myrtales
- Family: Onagraceae
- Subfamily: Onagroideae
- Tribe: Epilobieae
- Genus: Chamaenerion; Ség.

Synonyms
- Pyrogennema Lunell; Epilobium subg. Chamerion Raf.; Chamerion (Raf.) Raf. ex Holub

= Chamaenerion =

Genus of flowering plants in the willowherb family

Chamaenerion is a genus of flowering plants in the family Onagraceae (the evening primrose or willowherb family). It has sometimes been included in the genus Epilobium. Members of the genus may be called willowherbs (along with Epilobium), or fireweeds, based on a common name used for C. angustifolium. They are upright herbaceous perennials, growing from a woody base or from rhizomes, with racemes of usually purple to pink flowers. All species are found in the northern hemisphere. Most occur in moist habitats; C. angustifolium is the exception, favouring disturbed ground.

== Description ==
Chamaenerion species are upright herbaceous perennials with either unbranched stems or, much less often, slightly branched stems. They either have a woody base or grow from rhizomes. The leaves are generally spirally arranged on the stems and are usually narrow, rarely ovate. The inflorescence is a simple or slightly branched raceme. Individual flowers have four petals that are rose-purple to pink, rarely white. The petals are free at the base rather than united in a floral tube, as in Epilobium. The lower petals are narrower than the upper ones, making the flower radially unsymmetric (zygomorphic). There are eight more-or-less equally sized stamens, and a long, four-lobed style. The fruit is a long, thin, four-chambered (loculicidal) capsule that splits to reveal the many seeds. The seeds have a tuft of hairs at one end.

== Taxonomy ==
The taxonomy of Chamaenerion is complicated, as there is contention over whether the genus be separated from Epilobium, and if so, whether the valid generic epithet should Chamaenerion or Chamerion.

=== Nomenclature ===
Nomenclatural issues were reviewed by Alexander N. Sennikov in 2011. Although pre-Linnaean authors had used the name Chamaenerion, which may have originated as early as 1561, in 1753 Carl Linnaeus preferred Epilobium. Chamaenerion is derived from the Greek chamai (χαμαί), meaning "low", "near the ground", and nerion (νήριον), the oleander, Nerium oleander. Some authors continued to use Chamaenerion (or the alternative spelling Chamaenerium), but this name was not published legitimately under the International Code of Nomenclature for algae, fungi, and plants (ICN) until Jean-François Séguier did so in 1754. It was assumed by some later authors that Séguier's name was a superfluous replacement for Linnaeus' Epilobium, but Sennikov argues that a strict application of the ICN shows that it was legitimate. Ludwig K.G. Pfeiffer in 1873 used Chamaenerion in a more restricted sense than Linnaeus' Epilobium, designating Epilobium angustifolium L. as the type species. Thus the correct name for a genus separated from Epilobium and including Linnaeus' Epilobium angustifolium is Chamaenerion.

In 1818, Constantine Samuel Rafinesque used the name Chamerion, suggesting it as either a subgenus or genus. Rafinesque had his own "rules" of botanical nomenclature, regarding it as appropriate to shorten generic names. However, his name was not acceptable under the ICN until published by Josef Ludwig Holub in 1972. Holub designated a different type species, Epilobium amenum Raf. As this is now included in Chamaenerion angustifolium, Chamaenerion has precedence over Chamerion. Sennikov's conclusion has been accepted by many sources since the publication of his paper, including Tropicos, GRIN Taxonomy for Plants, the Onagraceae website of the Smithsonian Museum of Natural History, and the Global Biodiversity Information Facility. Some sources published earlier that also split up Epilobium use the name Chamerion, including the Flora of China.

=== Phylogeny and classification ===
In 1994, a molecular phylogenetic study of 22 taxa of Epilobium, broadly defined, included three species previously assigned by some botanists to a separate genus, Chamaenerion, and by others to a section within Epilobium. The results showed that Epilobium and Chamaenerion were sister taxa:

- - outgroup
  - - Epilobium
      19 taxa
    - Chamaenerion
      - C. dodonaei
      - - C. angustifolium
        - C. latifolium

The finding that Chamaenerion is sister to the rest of the genus contradicted a hypothesis that it was a specialized subgroup of Epilobium. Chamaenerion can be distinguished from Epilobium by features which include: having leaves mostly spirally arranged rather than mostly opposite; having flowers that are zygomorphic rather than mainly radially symmetrical; and lacking a floral tube and a notch in the petals. A 2007 monograph on the classification of the family Onagraceae accepted the separation of Epilobium and Chamaenerion (under the name Chamerion), dividing Chamaenerion into two sections, Chamaenerion and Rosmarinifolium. Differences between the species in the two sections are summarized in the table below.

Differences between sections
	C. sect. Chamaenerion	C. sect. Rosmarinifolium
Inflorescence	simple raceme	usually a compound raceme
Buds	usually sharply reflexed	more-or-less erect
Style	may have fine hairs on lower part	hairless throughout
Seeds	smooth	covered with fine papillae (bumps)

=== Species ===
As of February 2012, eight species were recognized, in two sections:

- Chamaenerion sect. Chamaenerion
  - Chamaenerion angustifolium (L.) Scop. – Eurasia and North America
  - Chamaenerion conspersum (Hausskn.) Kitam. - Himalayas, China
  - Chamaenerion latifolium (L.) Th.Fr. & Lange – Eurasia and North America
  - Chamaenerion speciosum (Decne.) Lodd. ex Steud. – Himalayas, China
- Chamaenerion sect. Rosmarinifolium
  - Chamaenerion colchicum (Albov) Steinb. – Caucasus, Western Asia
  - Chamaenerion dodonaei (Vill.) Schur – Eurasia
  - Chamaenerion fleischeri (Hochst.) Fritsch – European Alps
  - Chamaenerion stevenii Sosn. ex Grossh. – Caucasus, Western Asia

== Distribution and habitat ==
Chamaenerion is native to the northern hemisphere. Six of the eight species are native to Eurasia; the two more widespread species, C. angustifolium and C. latifolium, are also found in North America. This contrasts with most members of the family Onagraceae, which are native only to the western hemisphere. Most species are found at high elevations, in moist, rocky areas. C. angustifolium is the exception, being widespread in disturbed habitats. Its American name, fireweed, reflects its regular occurrence in areas recovering from wildfires, to which it may be adapted. In Britain it is known as rosebay willowherb.

== Ecology ==
Chamaenerion species are used as food plants by the caterpillars of certain Lepidoptera species, including:

- Double-striped pug (Gymnoscelis rufifasciata), recorded on fireweed (Chamaenerion angustifolium)
- The gothic (Naenia typica), recorded on fireweed
- Hebrew character (Orthosia gothica), recorded on fireweed
- Langton's forester moth (Alypia langtoni), recorded on fireweed
- Setaceous Hebrew character (Xestia c-nigrum), recorded on fireweed
- Elephant hawk-moth (Deilephila elpenor) and Small elephant hawk-moth (Deilephila porcellus), on fireweed

== Cultivation ==
The white form of Chamaenerion angustifolium is recommended as a border plant where it will not prove too invasive. It can grow to 2 m (7 ft) tall. C. dodonaei and C. fleischeri are grown in alpine gardens, where they form clumps to about 20–30 cm (8–12 in).
