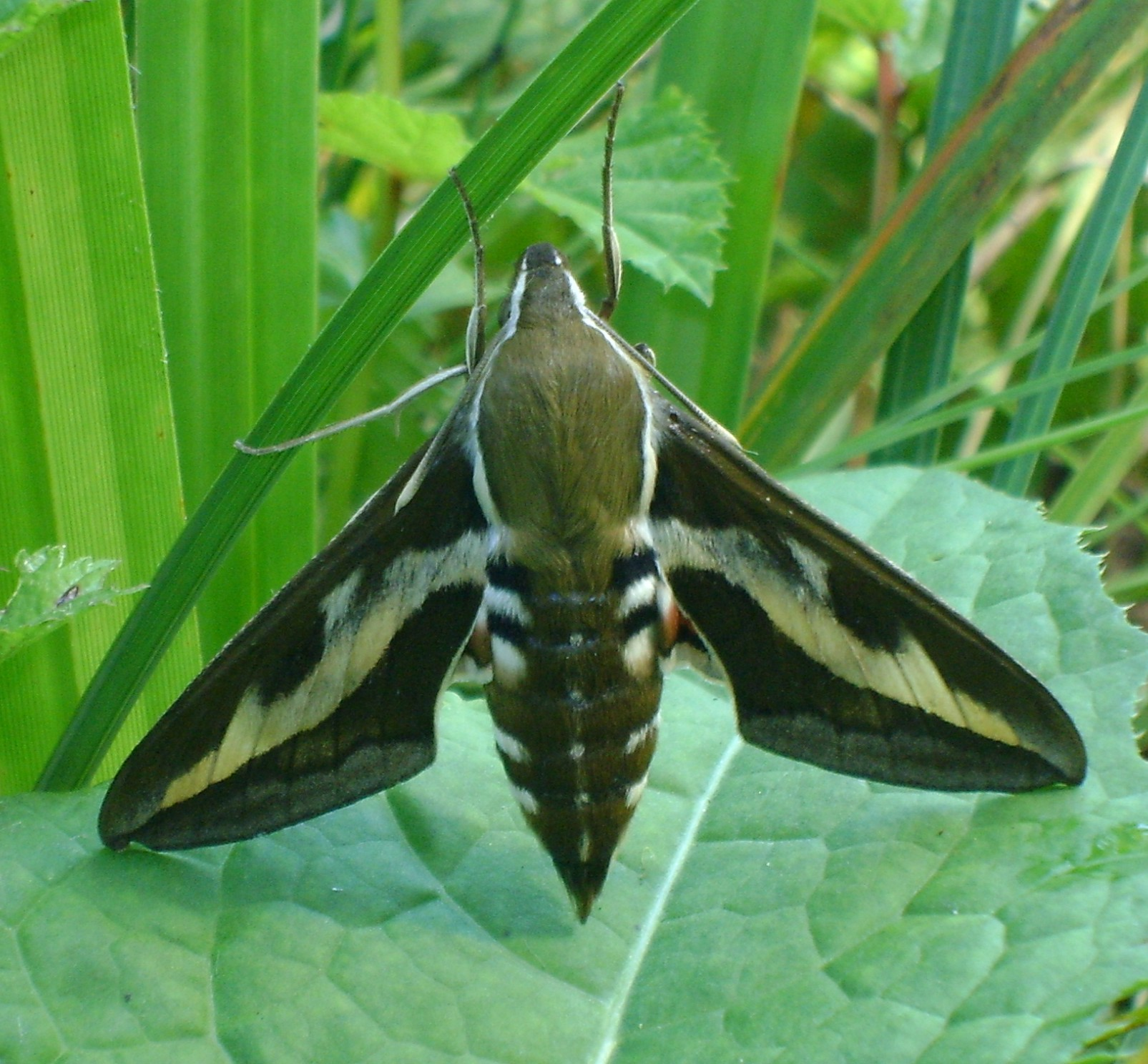

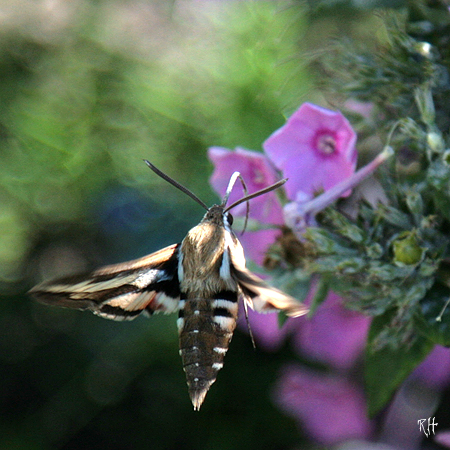
- Feeding

Conservation status
- Secure (NatureServe)

Scientific classification
- Kingdom: Animalia
- Phylum: Arthropoda
- Clade: Pancrustacea
- Class: Insecta
- Order: Lepidoptera
- Family: Sphingidae
- Genus: Hyles
- Species: H. gallii

Binomial name
- Hyles gallii (Rottemburg, 1775)

Synonyms
- List: Sphinx gallii von Rottemburg, 1775; Sphinx galli Denis & Schiffermüller, 1775; Deilephila canadensis Guenée, 1868; Deilephila chamaenerii Harris, 1839; Deilephila galii Kirby, 1892; Deilephila intermedia Kirby, 1837; Deilephila oxybaphi Clemens, 1859; Sphinx epilobii Harris, 1833; Celerio galii Kuznetsova, 1906; Celerio gallii chishimana Matsumura, 1929; Celerio gallii flavescens Closs, 1920; Celerio gallii grisea Tutt, 1904; Celerio gallii grisescens Bandermann, 1932; Celerio gallii heliophila Eichler, 1971; Celerio gallii incompleta Tutt, 1904; Celerio gallii lata Tutt, 1904; Celerio gallii nepalensis Daniel, 1961; Celerio gallii pallida Tutt, 1904; Celerio gallii postrufescens Lempke, 1959; Celerio gallii sachaliensis Matsumura, 1929; Celerio gallii scholzi Stephan, 1924; Celerio gallii stricta Tutt, 1904; Celerio gallii testacea (Wladasch, 1933); Celerio gallii tibetanica Eichler, 1971; Deilephila gallii cuspidata Fritsch, 1916; Deilephila gallii dentata Gschwandner, 1912; Deilephila gallii lutea Gschwandner, 1912; Deilephila gallii maculifera Klemensiewicz, 1912

= Hyles gallii =

Bedstraw hawk-moth

Species of moth

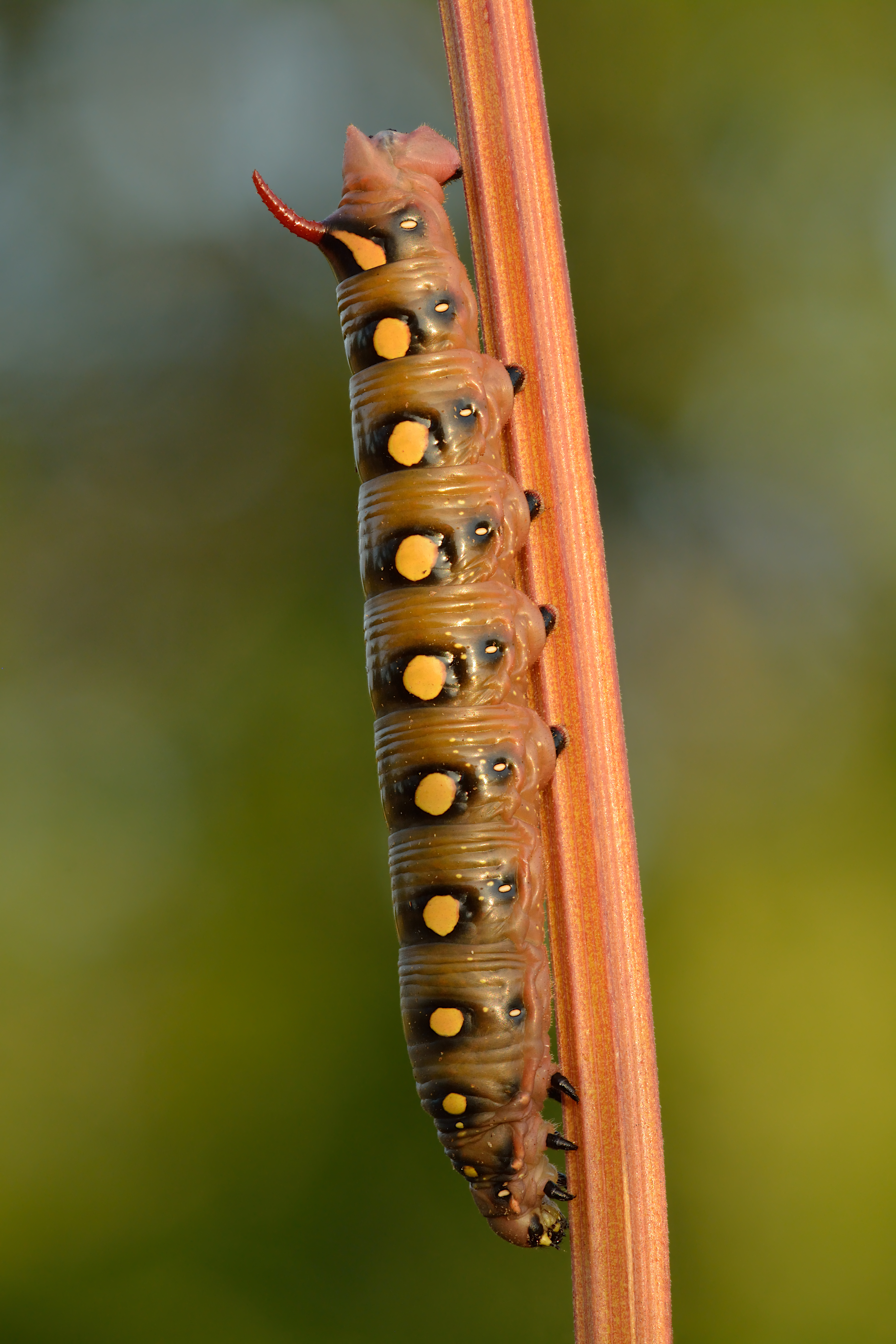
Late stage caterpillar

Hyles gallii, the bedstraw hawk-moth or galium sphinx, is a moth of the family Sphingidae. The species was first described by S. A. von Rottemburg in 1775.

== Similar species ==
- Hyles dahlii (Geyer, 1827)
- Hyles euphorbiae (Linnaeus, 1758) - spurge hawk-moth
- Hyles livornica (Esper, 1779) - lined sphinx
- Hyles nicaea (de Prunner, 1798)
- Hyles tithymali (Boisduval, 1832)

DNA testing resulted into the following relationships among the Palaearctic widespread species of the genus Hyles:

- - - Hyles nicaea
    - Hyles gallii
  - - Hyles livornica
    - - Hyles vespertilio
      - Hyles euphorbiae - Complex s.l.

== Distribution ==
Hyles gallii is present in North America, in Europe to the Arctic Circle, in Central Asia and in Japan.

== Description ==
Hyles gallii have a wingspan reaching 55 to 80 mm. In appearance, this species is very similar to Hyles euphorbiae. However, in H. gallii the red of the hindwings is not so extensive and the olive-colored band on the forewings is not interrupted.

The following information was taken from the public-domain The Illustrated Natural History of British Moths (1869) by Edward Newman.

The Bedstraw Hawk-Moth - Fore wings olive brown, with a broad, irregular, whitish stripe along the middle; hind wings black at the base; then a broad pinkish-white band, quite white near the body, and bright pink about the middle; then a distinct black band, and then a grey margin; thorax and body olive-brown, a white line on each side of the thorax just at the base of the wings; this line runs on each side along the head just above the eye; sides of the body with black and whitish spots.

The caterpillar is smooth, bluish-green above, inclining to pink beneath, sometimes brown and sometimes black, but always having a pale, almost yellow, line down the middle of the back, and a row of ten conspicuous eye-like yellow spots, on each side; the head is green, brown, or black, according to the colour of the caterpillar, but the horn above the tail is invariably red. … The chrysalis is brown, and is found in the sand. The caterpillar feeds in August and September, and the Moth appears about Midsummer.

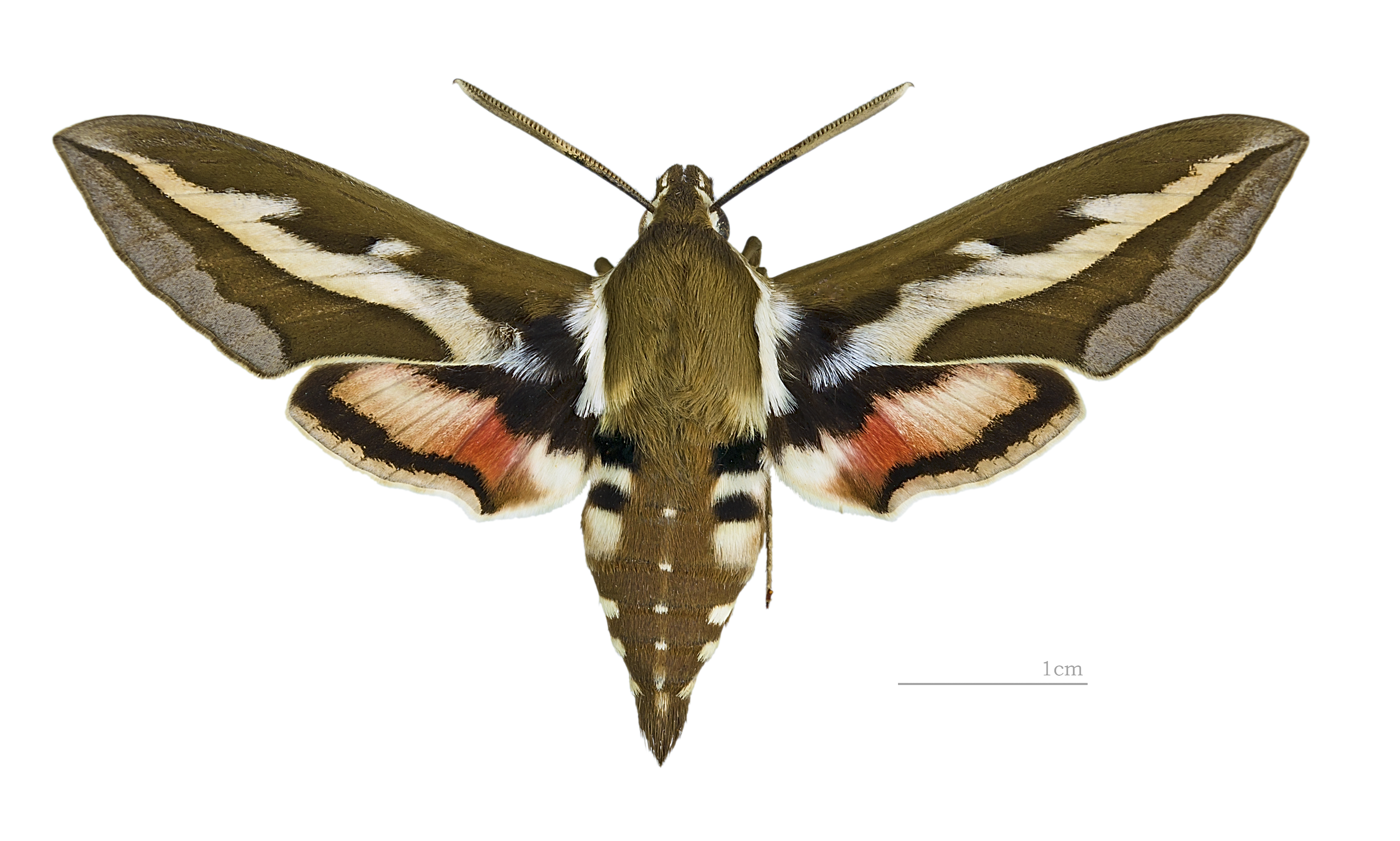
Male

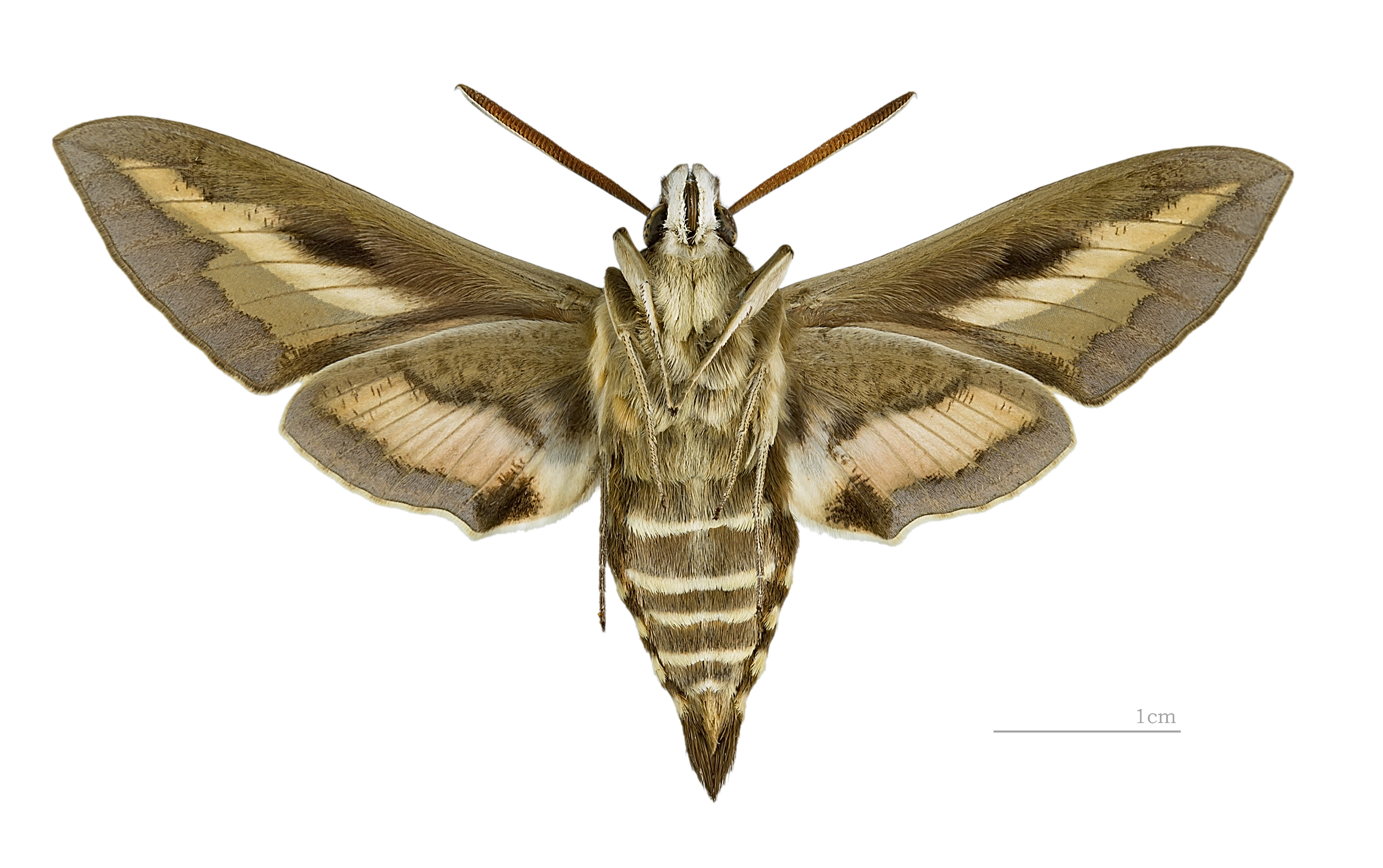
Male

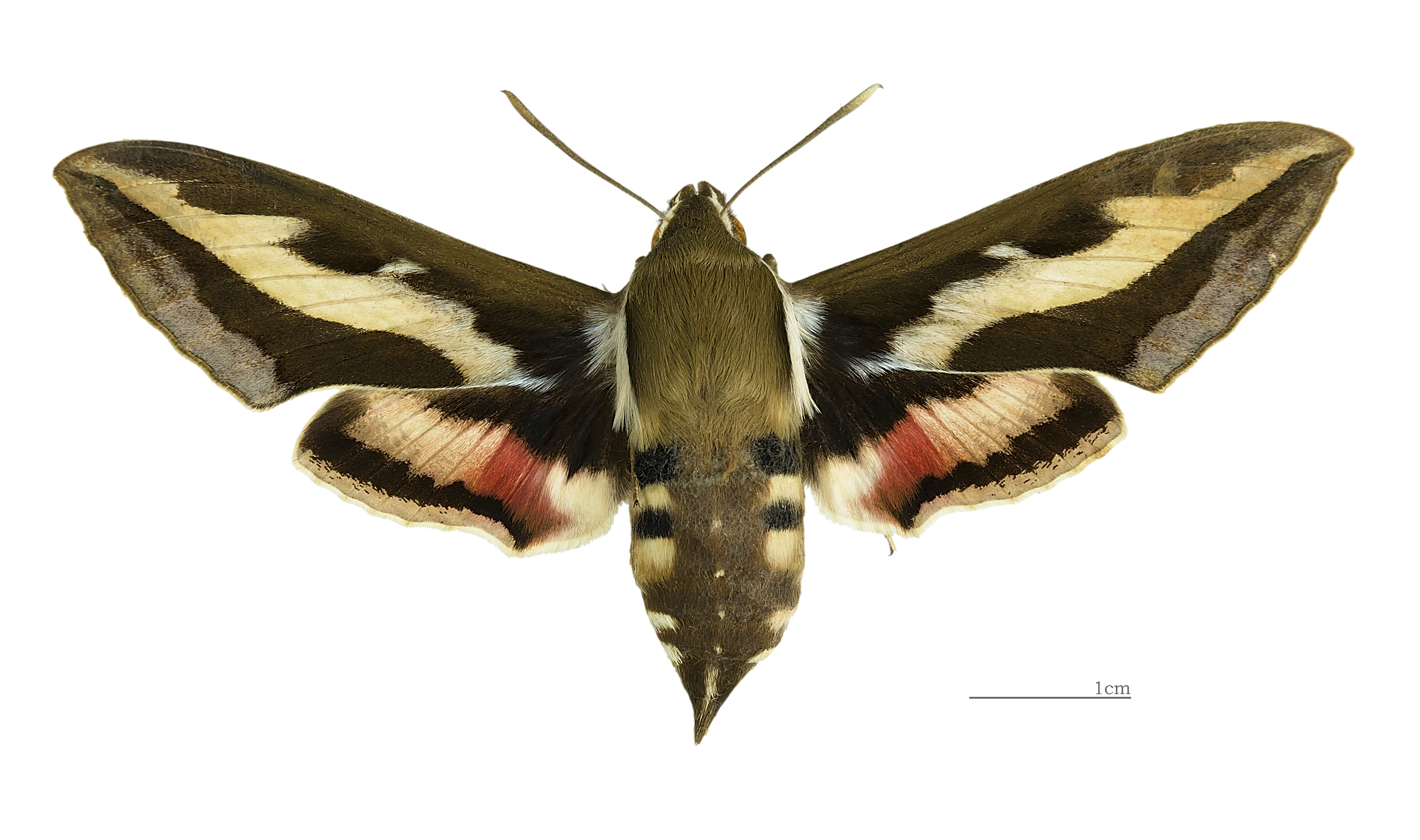
Female

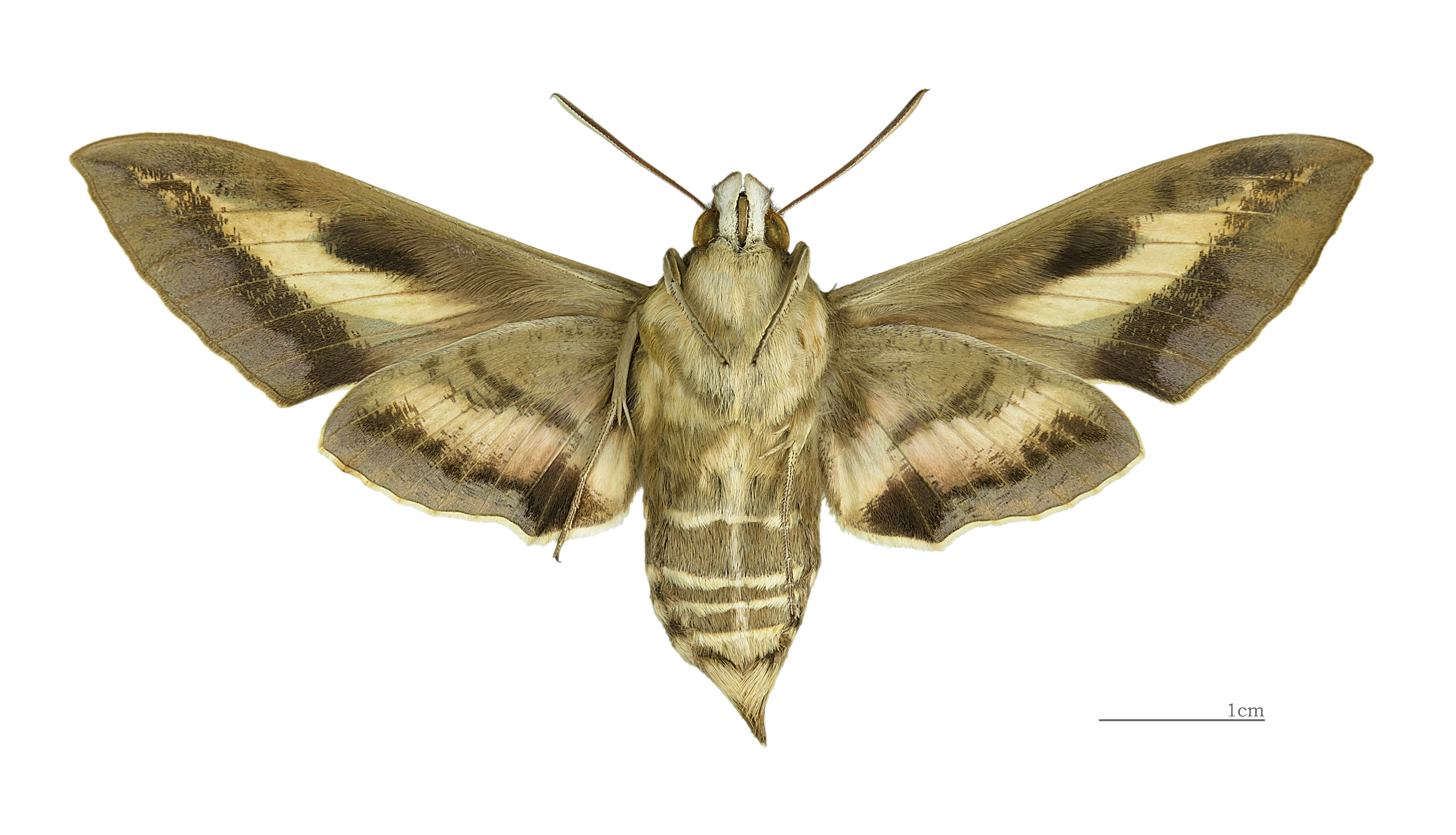
Female

A video of a Hyles gallii. The video can also be watched in lower resolution.

== Biology ==
These moths can be encountered at dusk feeding on flowers, but they are active by night up to the day light. The flight period extends from May to October usually in one generation, but in good years there can be a second generation.

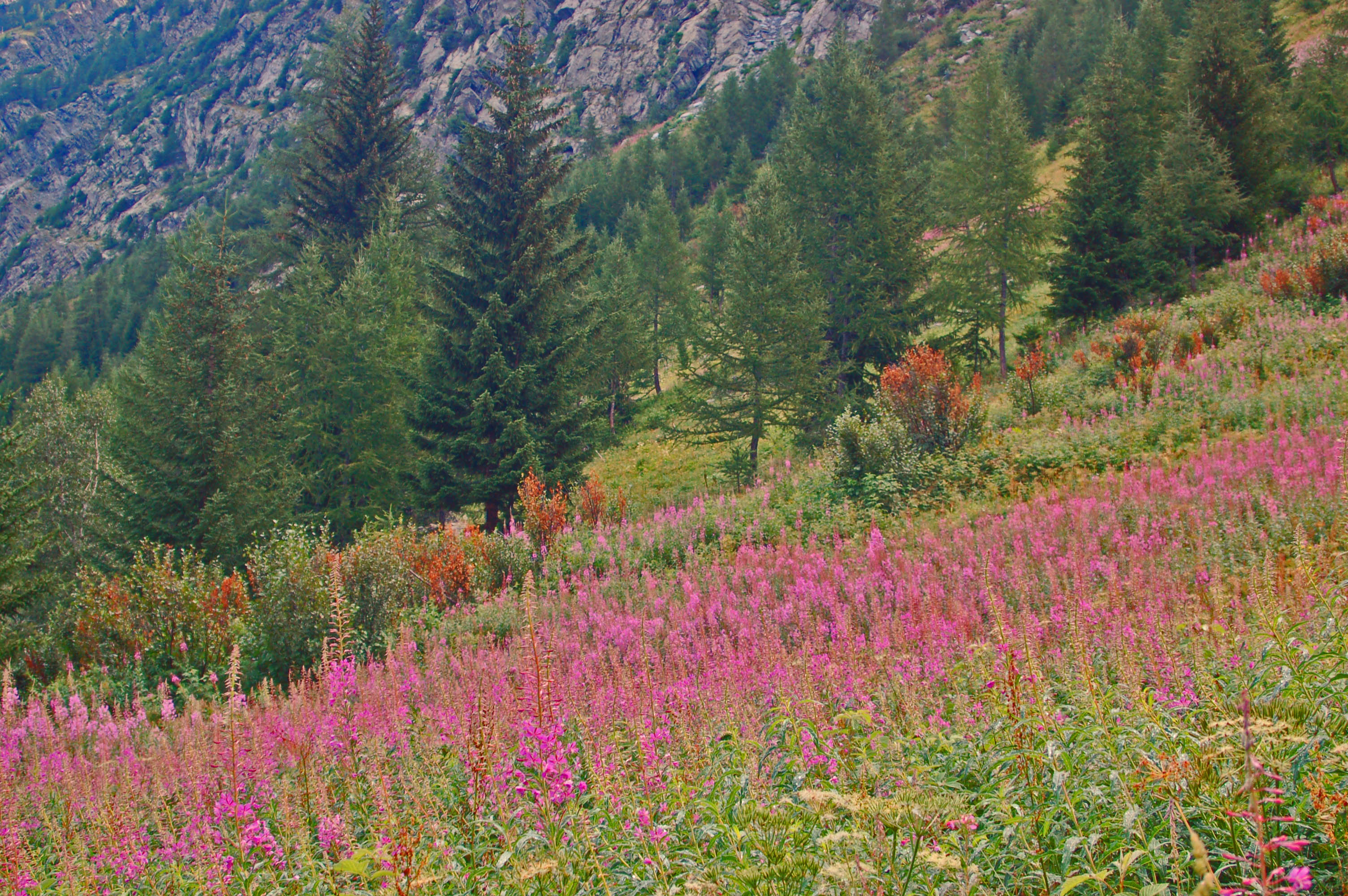
Habitat of Hyles gallii. La Thuile, Italy at about 2700 meters above sea level

The larva can reach a length of 70 to 80 millimeters and are variable. One type is olive green with cream spots and a reddish-brown head, while another version is almost entirely black. The colour of the larva darkens before pupation. They feed on fireweed (Chamaenerion angustifolium, Epilobium montanum), on bedstraw (Galium verum and Galium mollugo) and various other plants (Clarkia, Fuchsia, Circaea, Plantago major, etc.), many of which are members of Onagraceae. They can be found from July to September.

== Habitat ==
This species prefers sandy or calcareous places, sunny heath, plantations, warm forest edges and wherever else it could find the host plants. These moths can be found in the Alps up to 2700 meters above sea level.

== Gallery ==
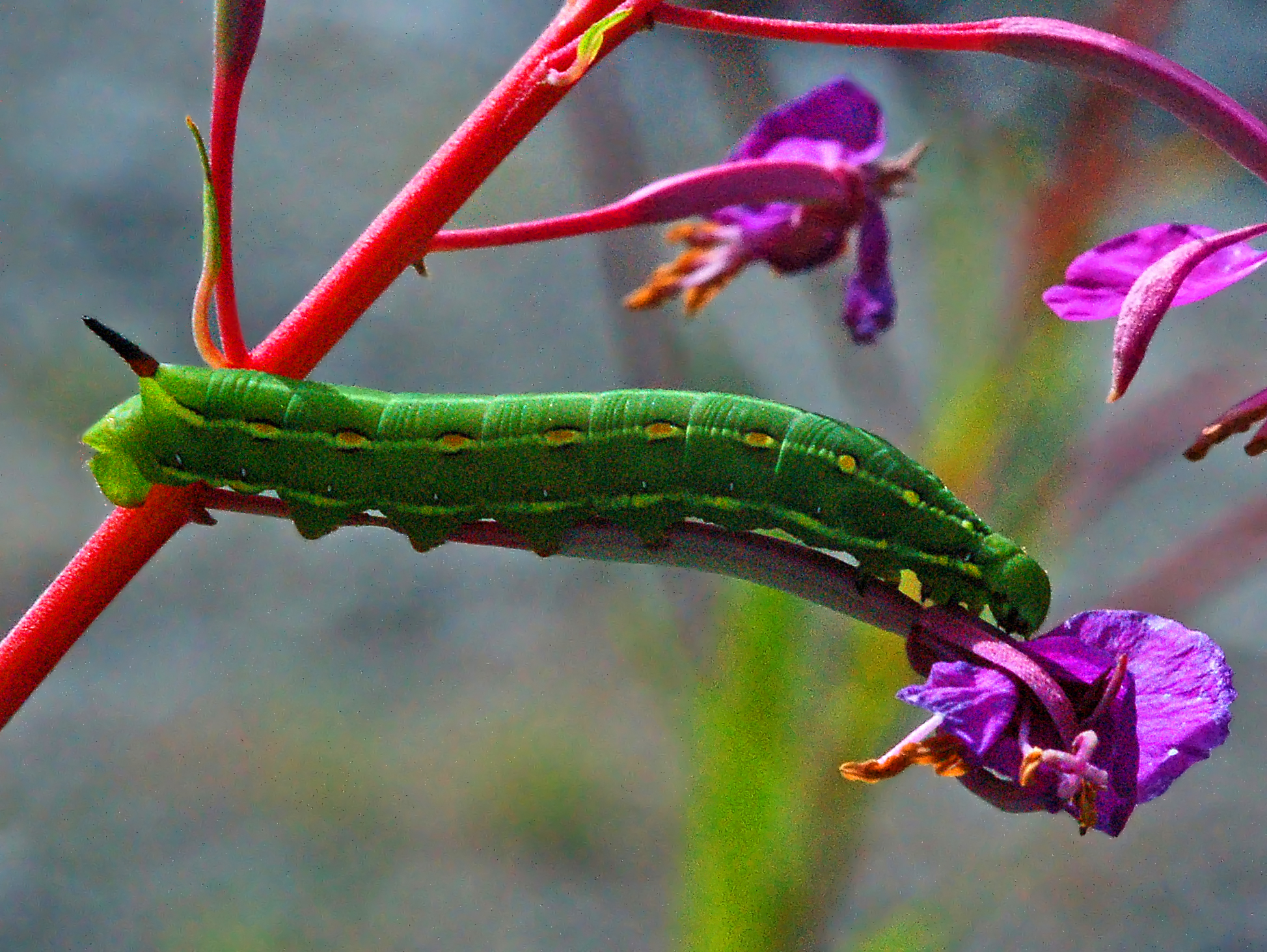
Caterpillar of Hyles gallii (young stage) on Epilobium angustifolium

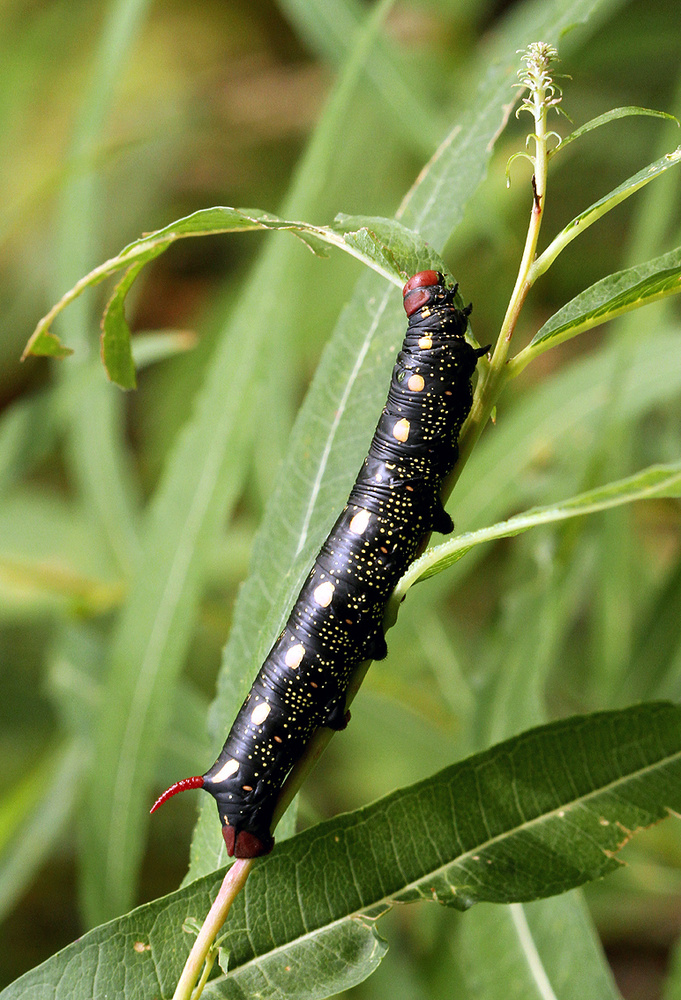
Hyles gallii caterpillar, black variant

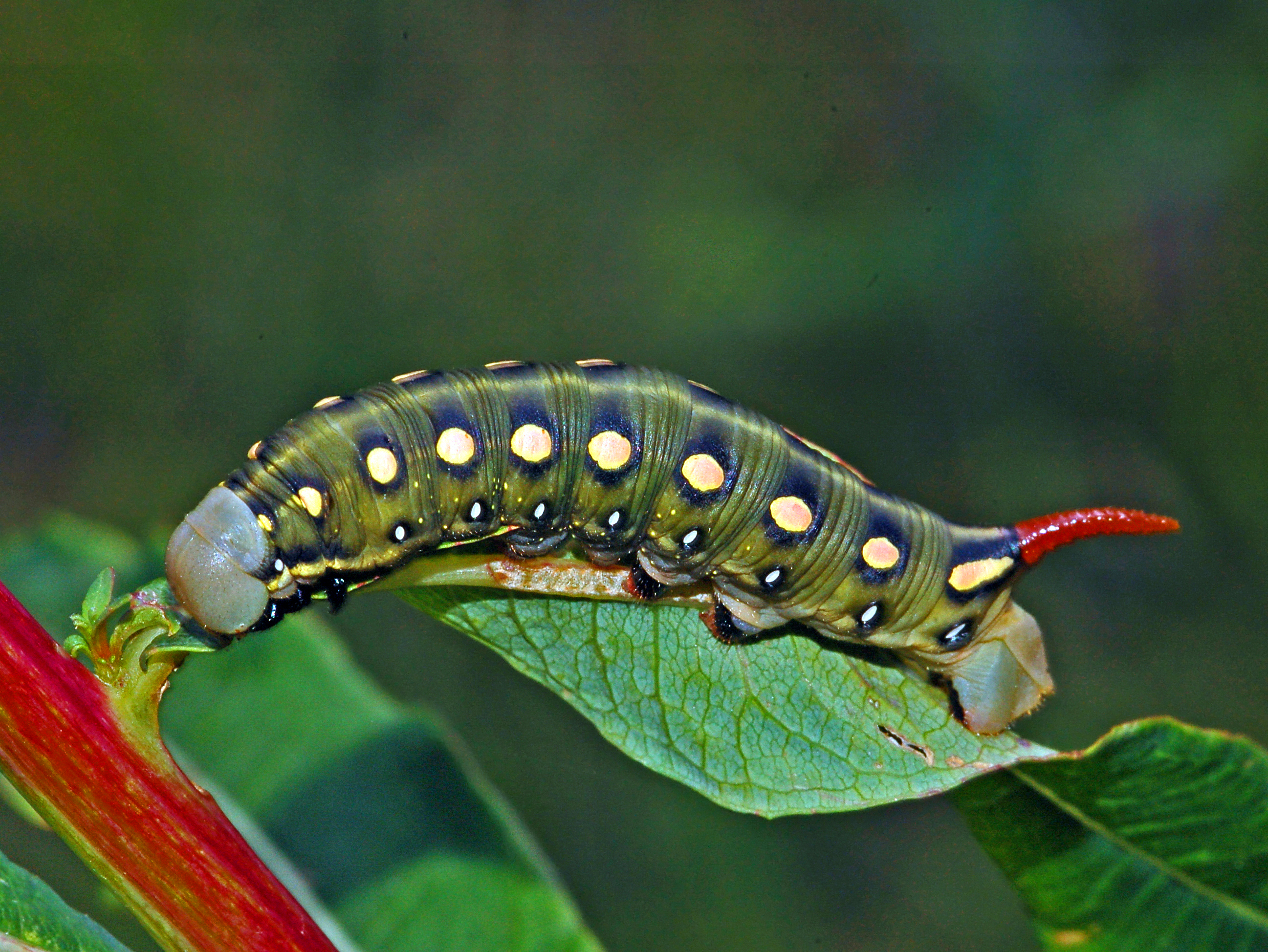
Hyles gallii caterpillar

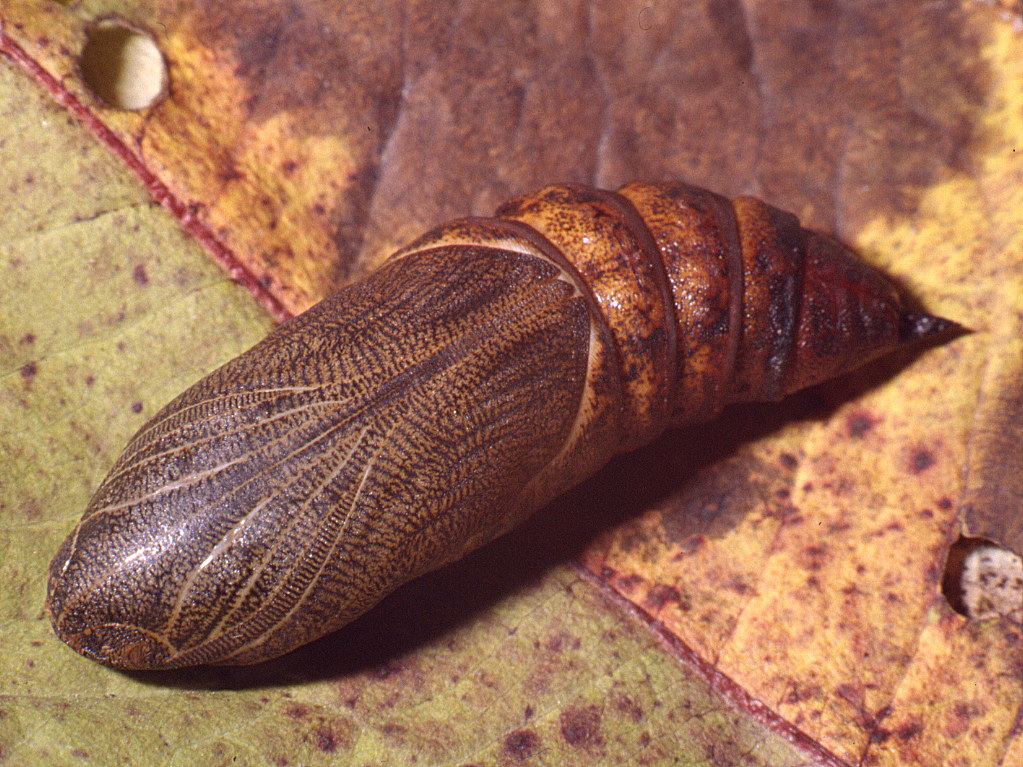
Pupa of Hyles gallii
