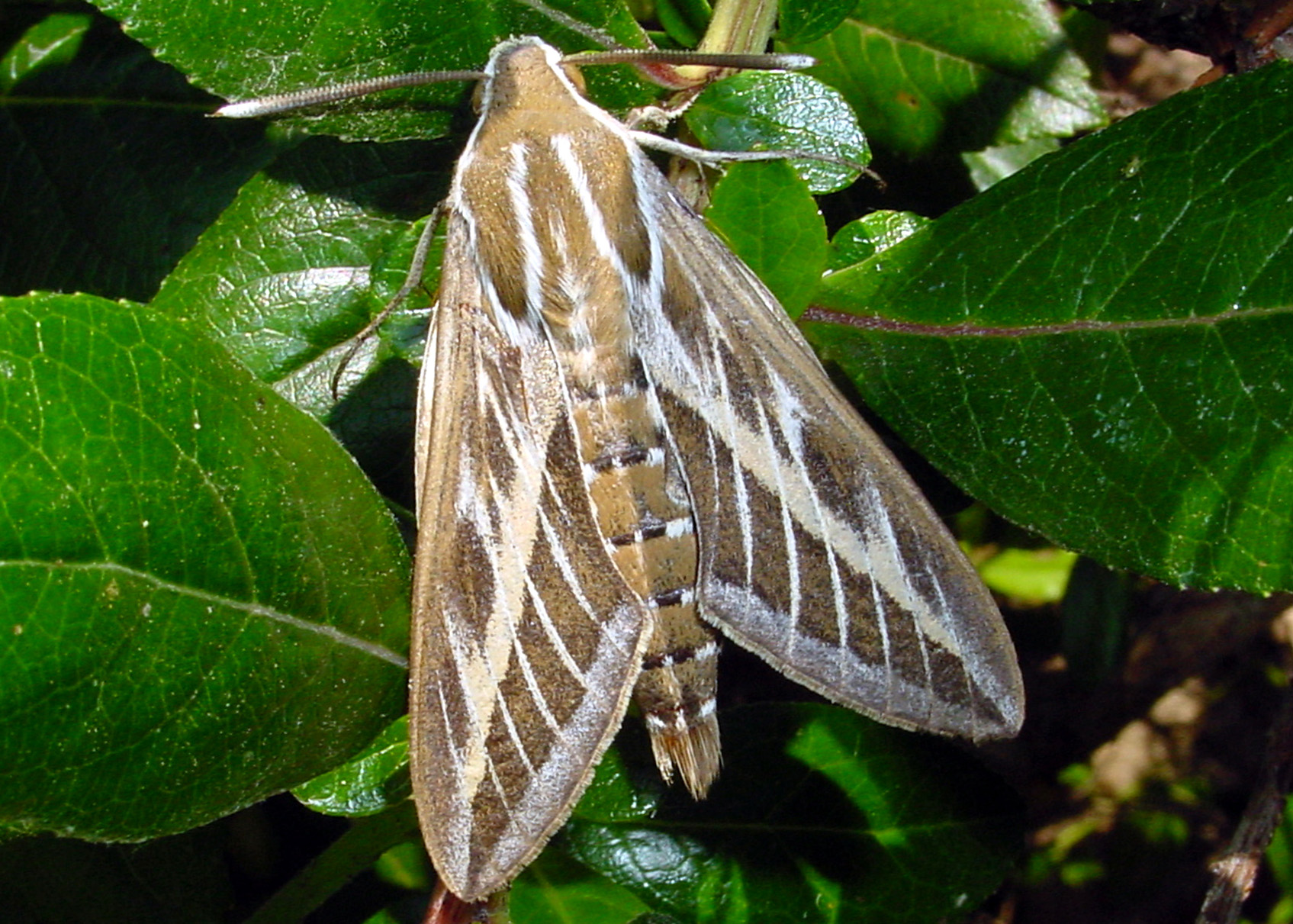

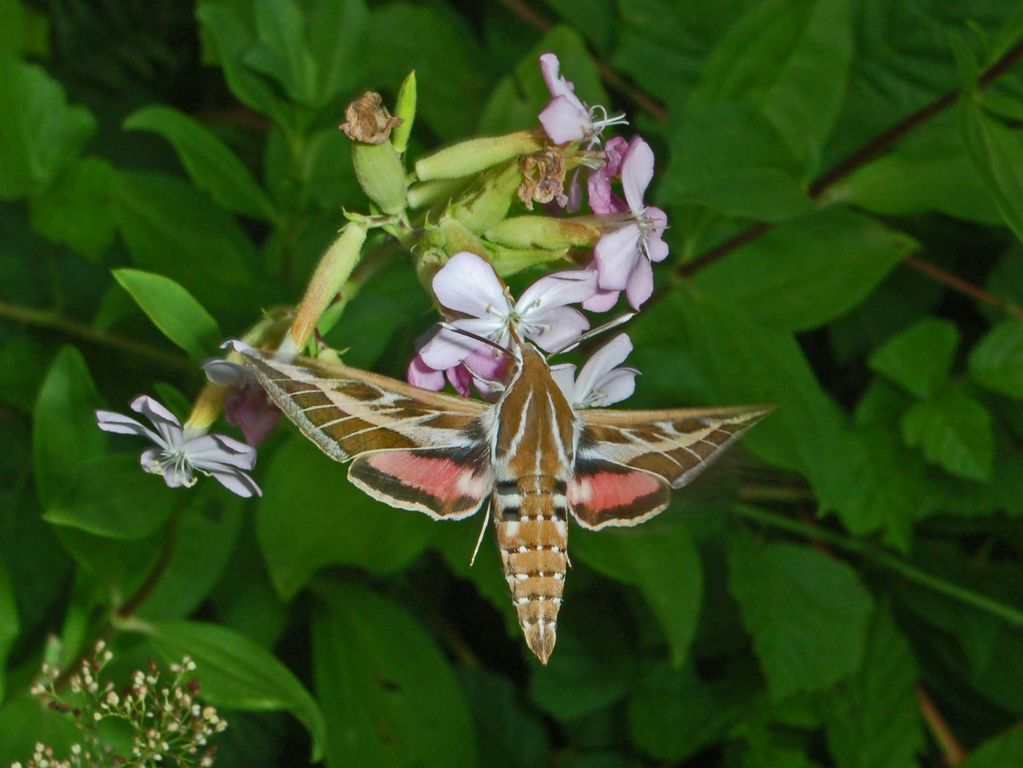

Scientific classification
- Kingdom: Animalia
- Phylum: Arthropoda
- Clade: Pancrustacea
- Class: Insecta
- Order: Lepidoptera
- Family: Sphingidae
- Genus: Hyles
- Species: H. livornica

Binomial name
- Hyles livornica (Esper, 1780)

Synonyms
- List: Sphinx livornica Esper, 1780; Phinx koechlini Fuessly, 1781; Celerio lineata saharae Gehlen, 1932; Celerio lineata tatsienluica Oberthür, 1916; Hyles renneri Eitschberger, Danner & Surholt, 1998; Celerio livornica perlimbata Abbayes, 1932; Celerio lineata obscurata Niepelt, 1922

= Hyles livornica =

Striped hawk-moth

Species of moth

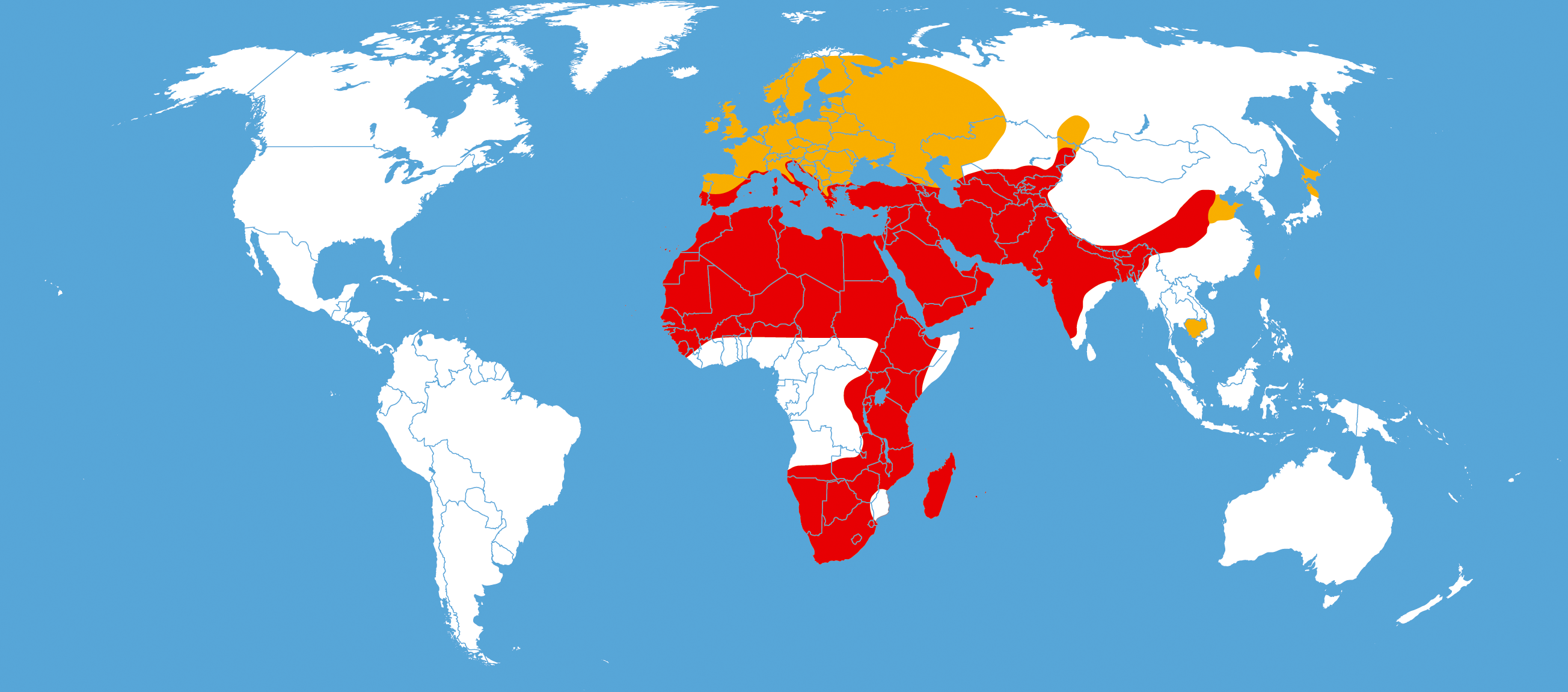
Distribution

Hyles livornica, the striped hawk-moth, is a moth of the family Sphingidae.

== Taxonomy and systematics ==
Eugenius Johann Christoph Esper described the striped hawk-moth in 1780 using a specimen found in Italy at Livorno (hence the Latin name livornica). In 1819 Jacob Hübner allocated this species in his newly erected genus Hyles.

Until the 20th century Hyles livornica has been considered conspecific with the American Hyles lineata and is therefore under that name (or as Celerio lineata ssp. livornica) found in the older literature. Similar was the case with the Hyles livornicoides, which is prevalent in Australia. Hyles renneri from Nepal is sometimes treated as a valid species.

On the basis of DNA testing it is well established that H. livornica in its entire Afro-Palaearctic distribution forms a genetic and taxonomic unit. This results in the following relationships among the Palaearctic widespread species of the genus Hyles:

- - - Hyles nicaea
    - Hyles gallii
  - - Hyles livornica
    - - Hyles vespertilio
      - Hyles euphorbiae - Complex s.l.

== Distribution ==
This species is found in Africa, southern Europe, Poland, Australia, and central and east Asia.

== Description ==
Hyles livornica has a wingspan reaching 60–80 mm. Males are slightly smaller than females. The forewings and the body are mainly olive brown or beige, with white stripes. The hindwings are pink, with black and white edges. The head and the thorax are olive-brown, with white stripes. The olive-brown abdomen has black-and-white segment, the first two segments have large black and white side spots. The antennae are dark olive brown and have a white tip.

These moths fly from February to October depending on the location. In Europe they are visible from April to June and from August to September in two generations and sometimes they overwinter. This species is a migrant from Africa to Europe. The caterpillars are green, with black markings and reach a length from 65 to 80 millimeters.

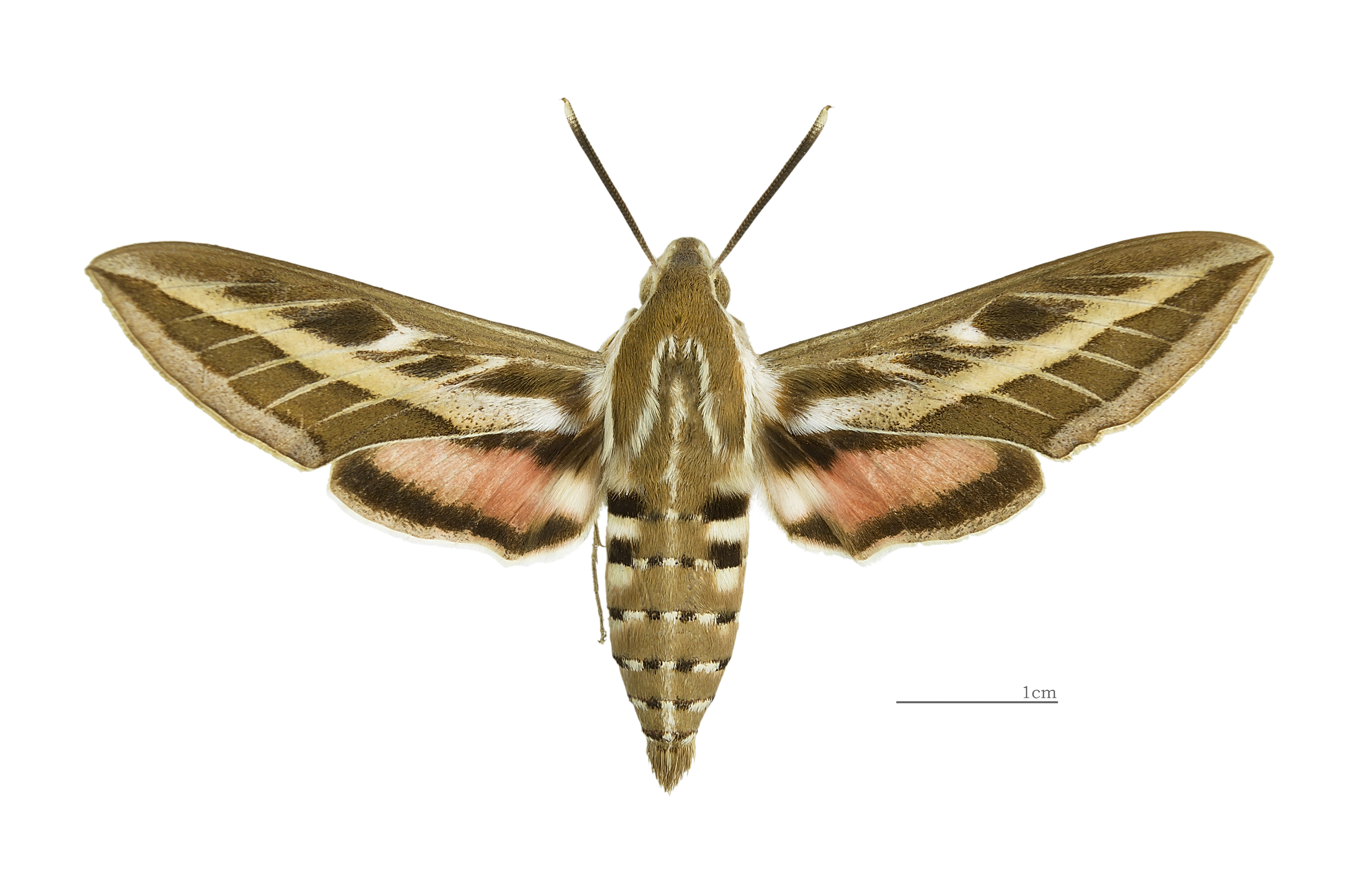
Male

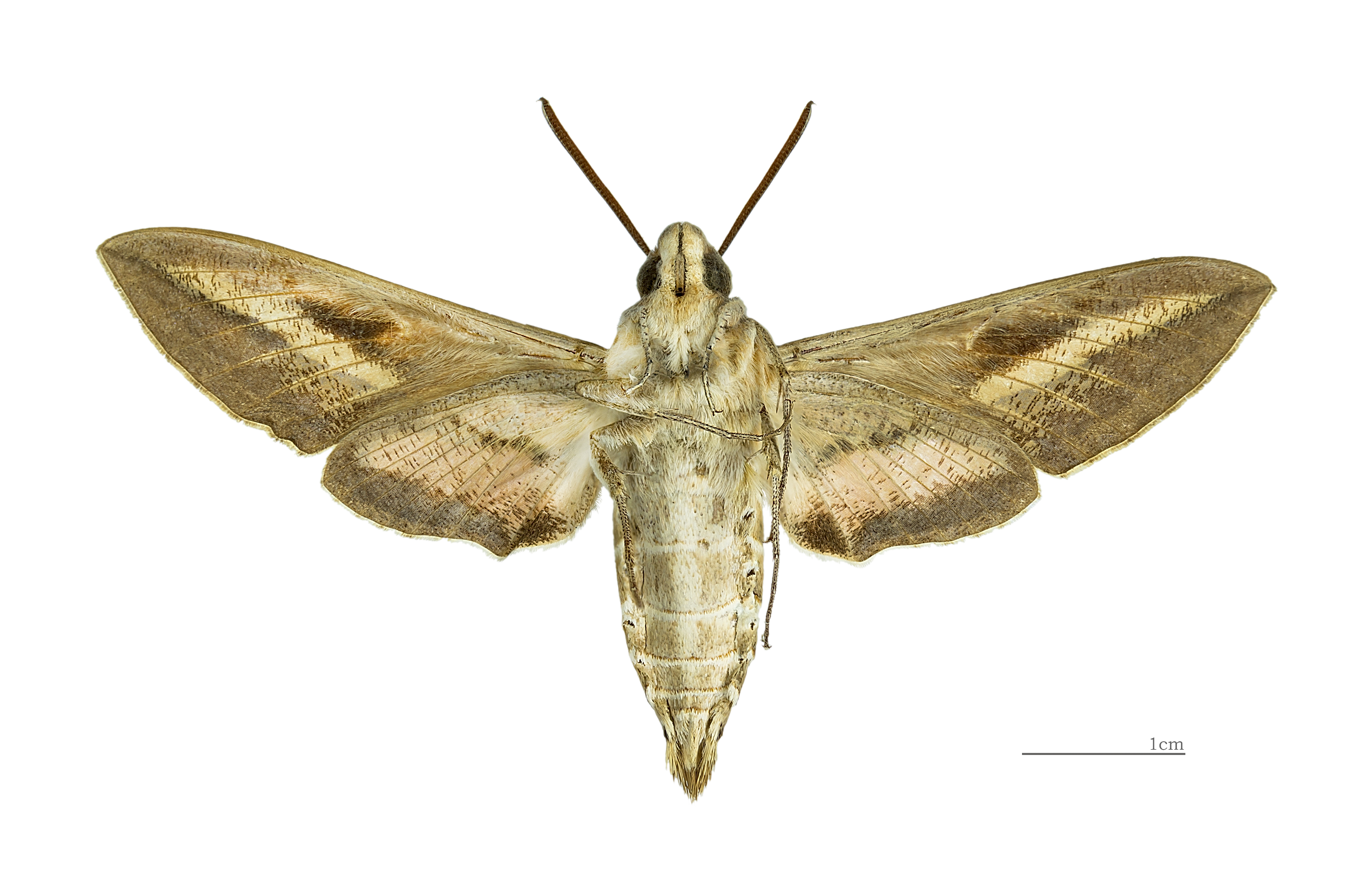
Male

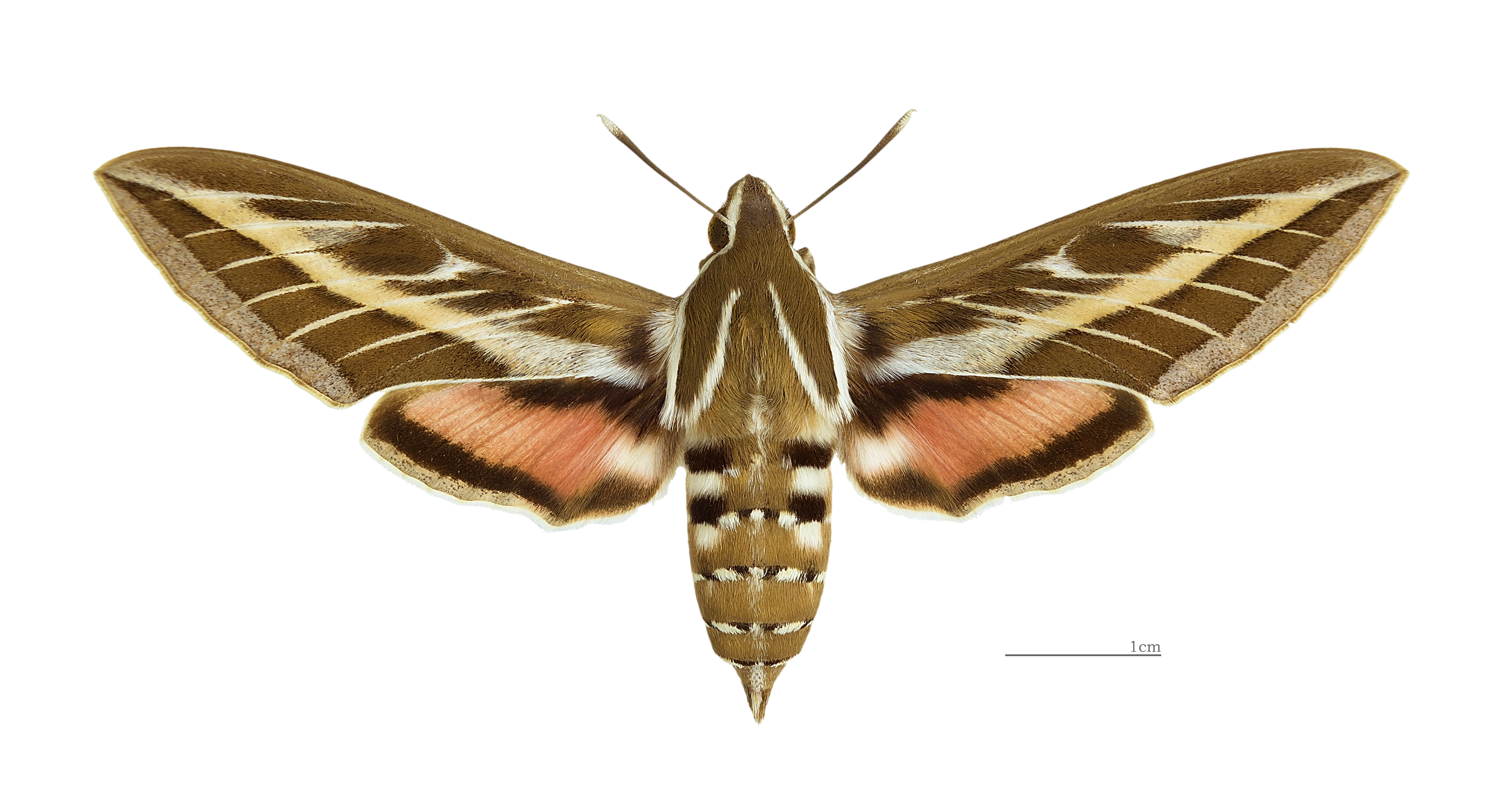
Female

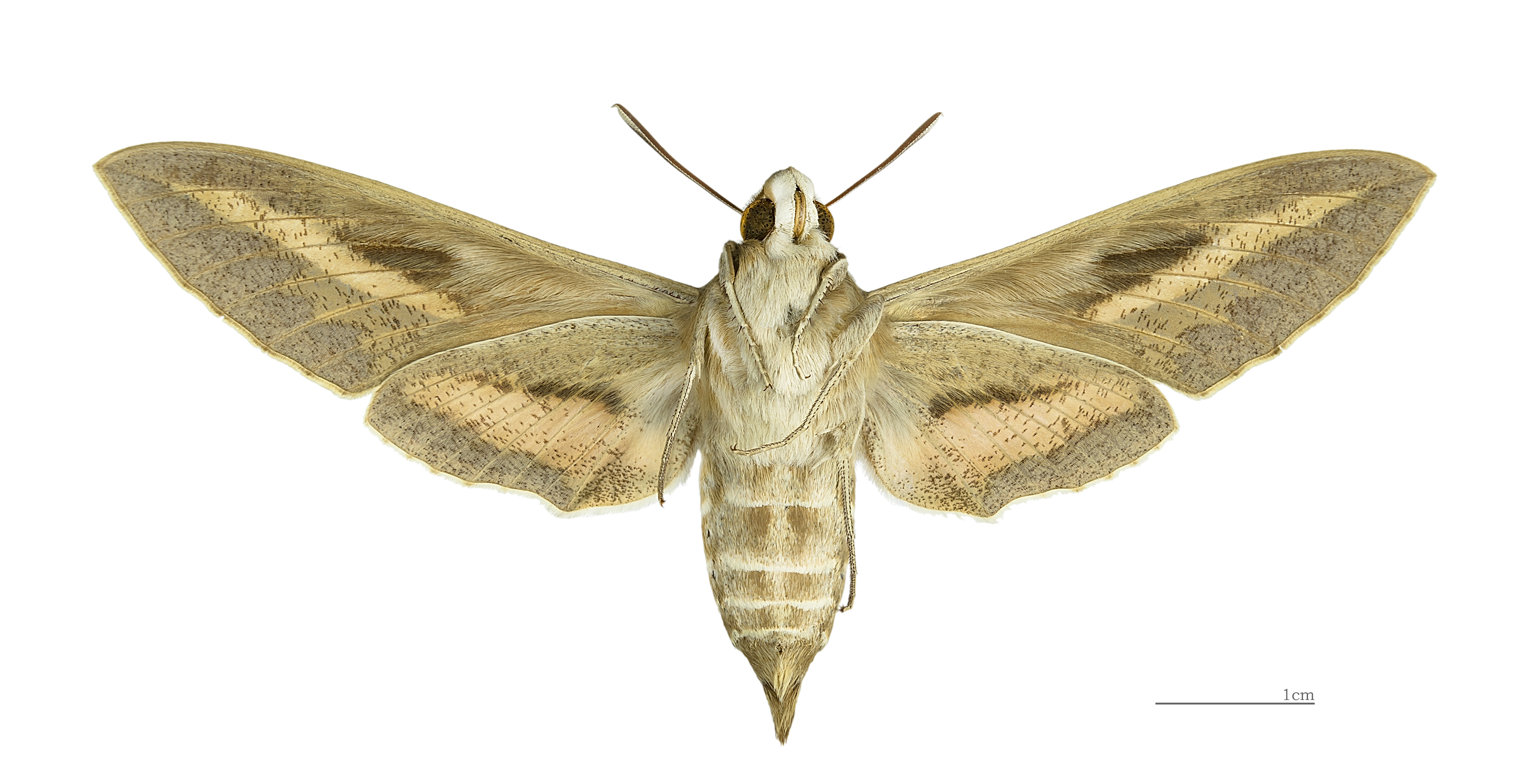
Female

== Biology ==
The caterpillars feed on various plants, mainly on Galium, Gossypium, Rumex, Vitis, Euphorbia, Linaria, Epilobium, Antirrhinum, Scabiosa, Linum, Fuchsia and Asphodelus.

== Gallery ==
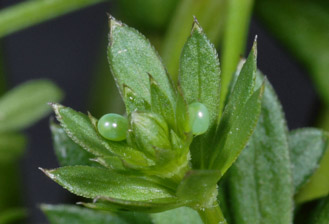
Eggs

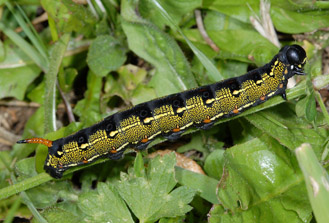
Caterpillar

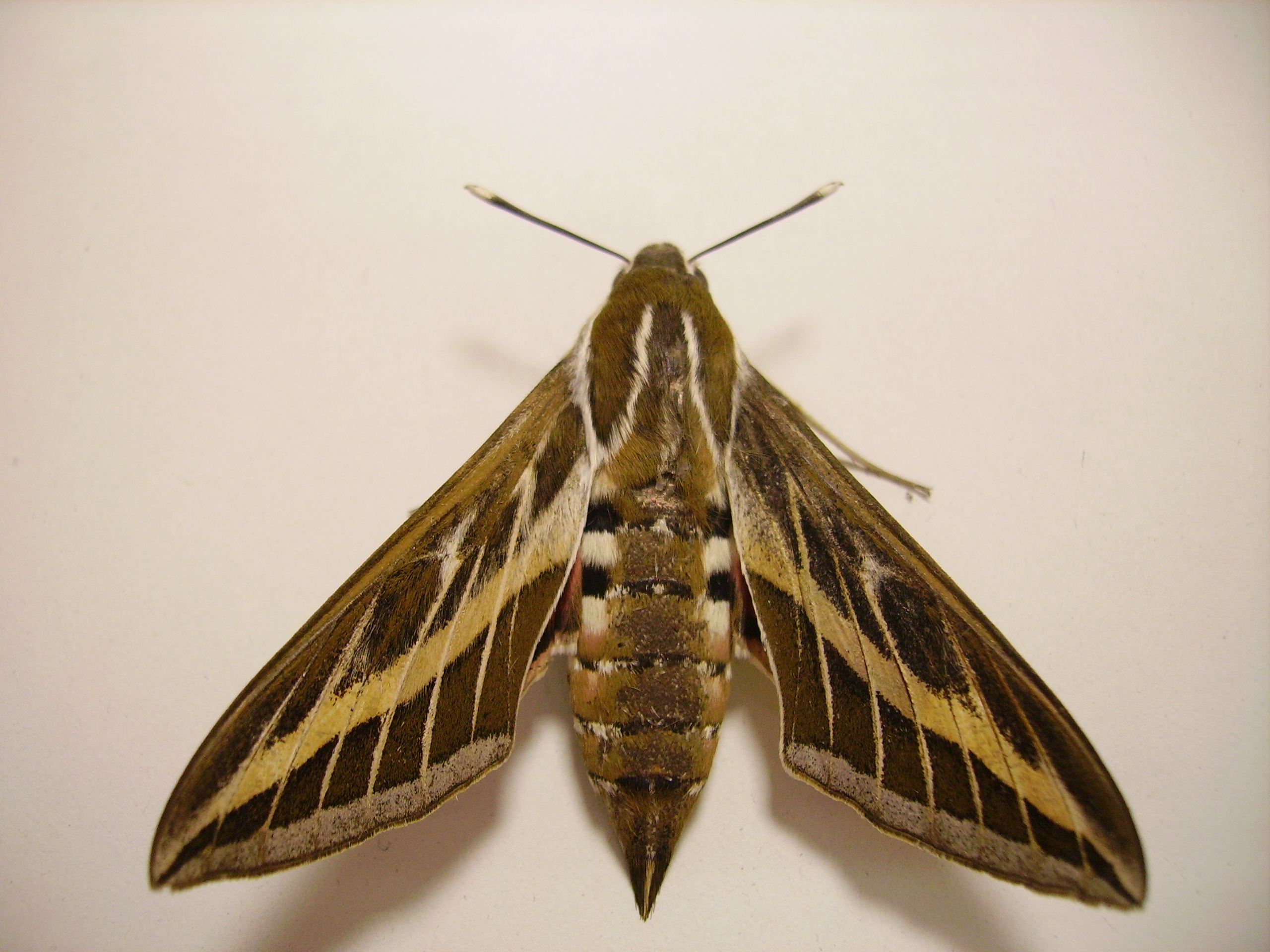

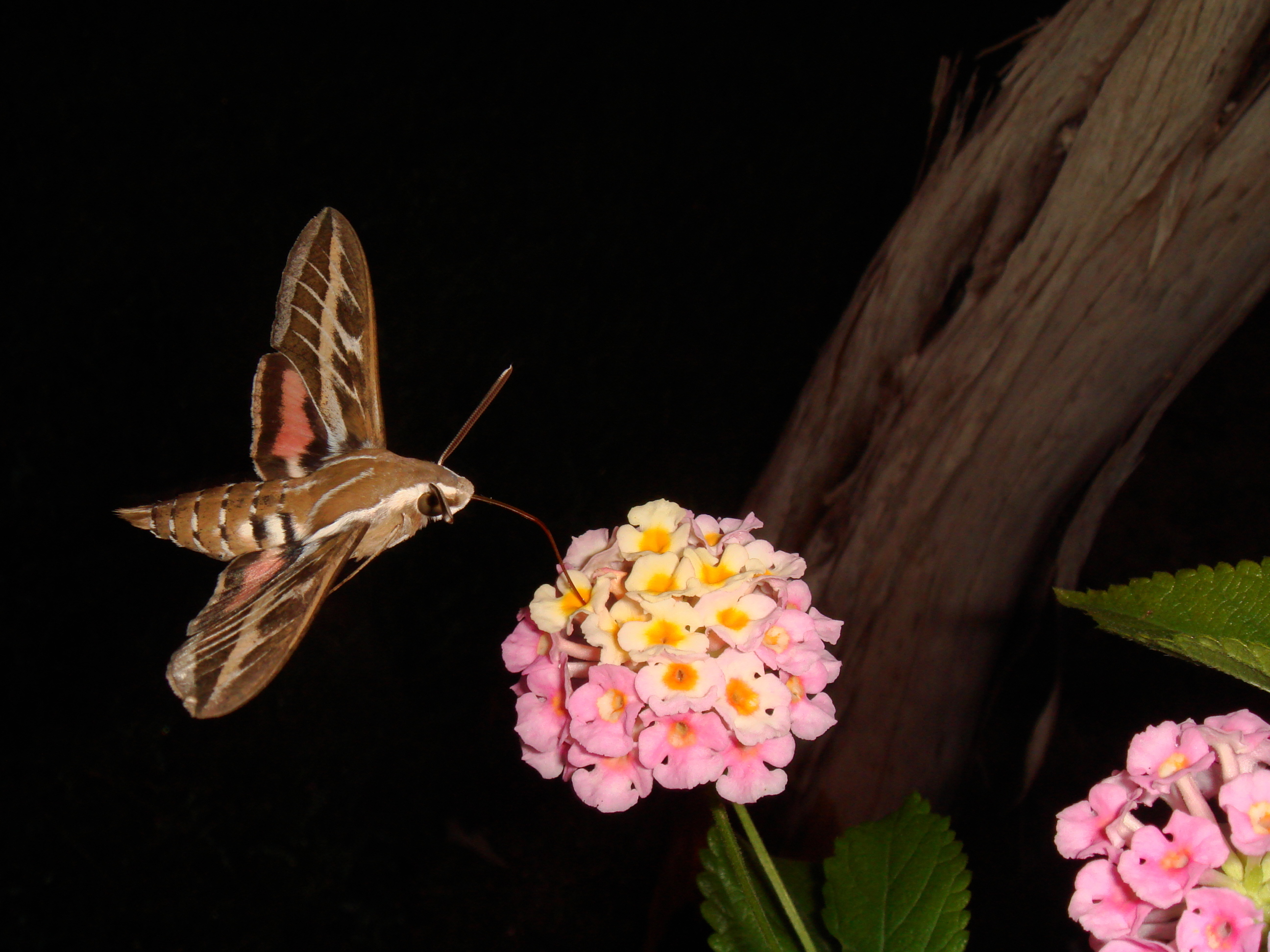
Feeding on Lantana flowers

== See also ==
- Lepidoptera migration
- Sphingidae
