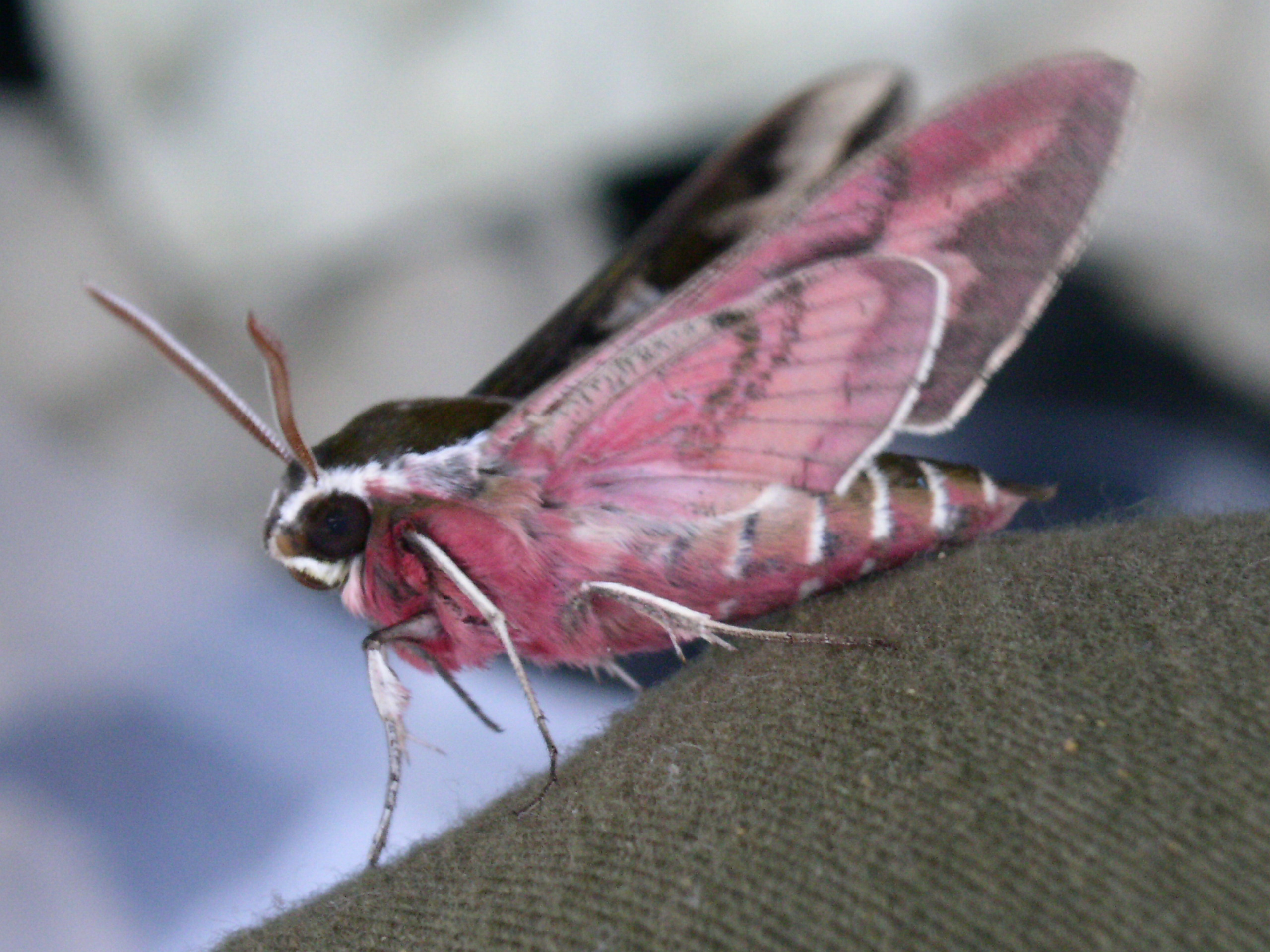

Scientific classification
- Kingdom: Animalia
- Phylum: Arthropoda
- Class: Insecta
- Order: Lepidoptera
- Family: Sphingidae
- Genus: Hyles
- Species: H. dahlii

Binomial name
- Hyles dahlii (Geyer, 1828)

Synonyms
- Sphinx dahlii Geyer, [1828]; Sphinx dahlii Boisduval, 1828; Sphinx lutescens (Oberthür, 1904); Sphinx praenubila (Schultz, 1907); Sphinx infuscata (Turati, 1910); Celerio euphorbiae balearica Rebel, 1926; Celerio cyanea (Gehlen, 1929); Celerio mediofascia (Bytinski-Salz, 1937)

= Hyles dahlii =

Species of moth

Hyles dahlii is a moth of the family Sphingidae first described by Carl Geyer in 1828.

== Distribution ==
It is found on Corsica, Sardinia and the Balearic Islands. On rare occasions it is found on Sicily and along the north-eastern coast of Spain. It was introduced to Tunisia in the mid 1980s.

On Menorca, the Hyles dahlii population consists of a hybrid with Hyles euphorbiae. Due to this hybridisation, only few characteristics of Hyles dahlii are present in the imago. There is also hybridisation on Malta. Here it is a hybrid between Hyles dahlii and Hyles tithymali. Research suggests that Hyles dahlii is in fact a species which evolved from Hyles tithymali through isolation.

== Description ==
The wingspan is 65–85 mm.

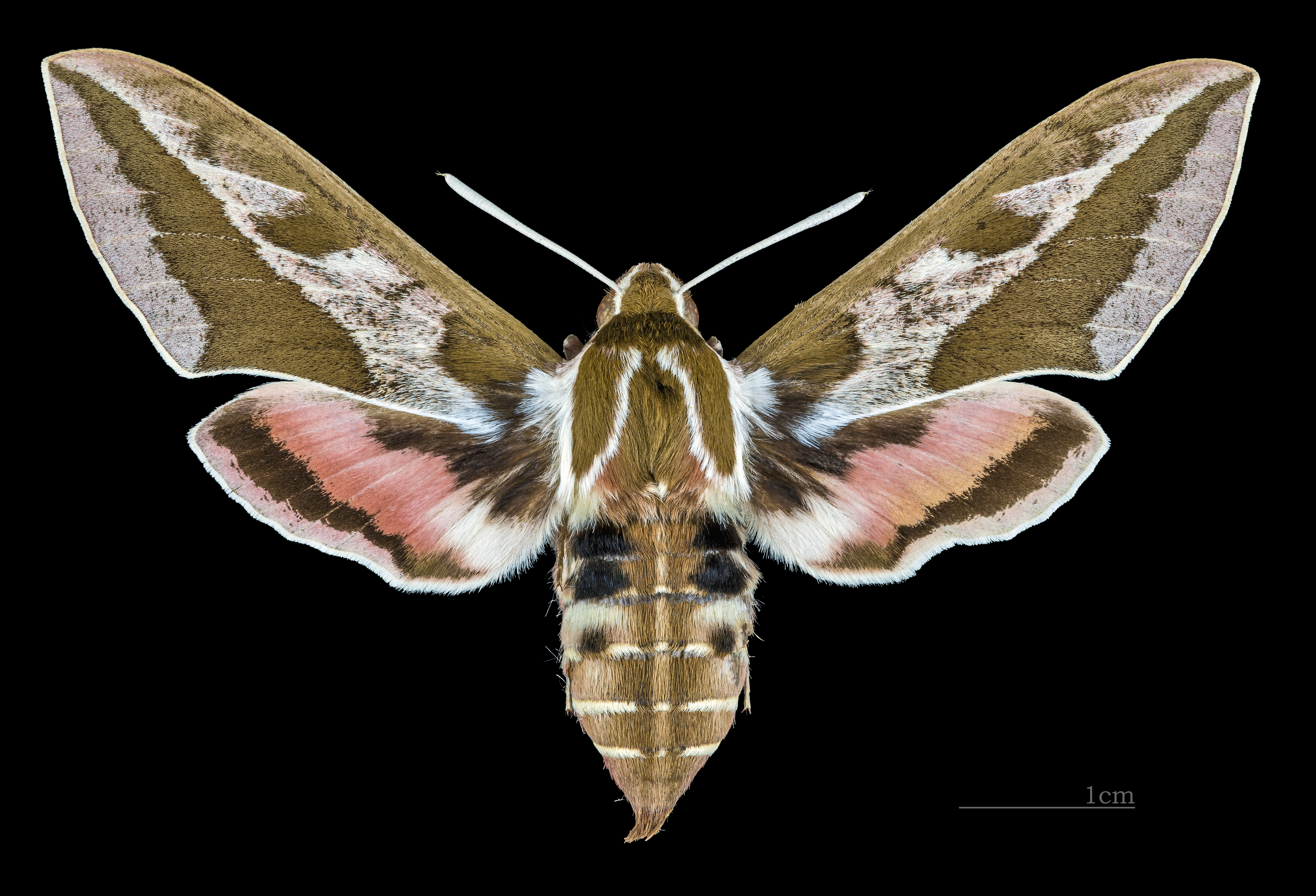
Female

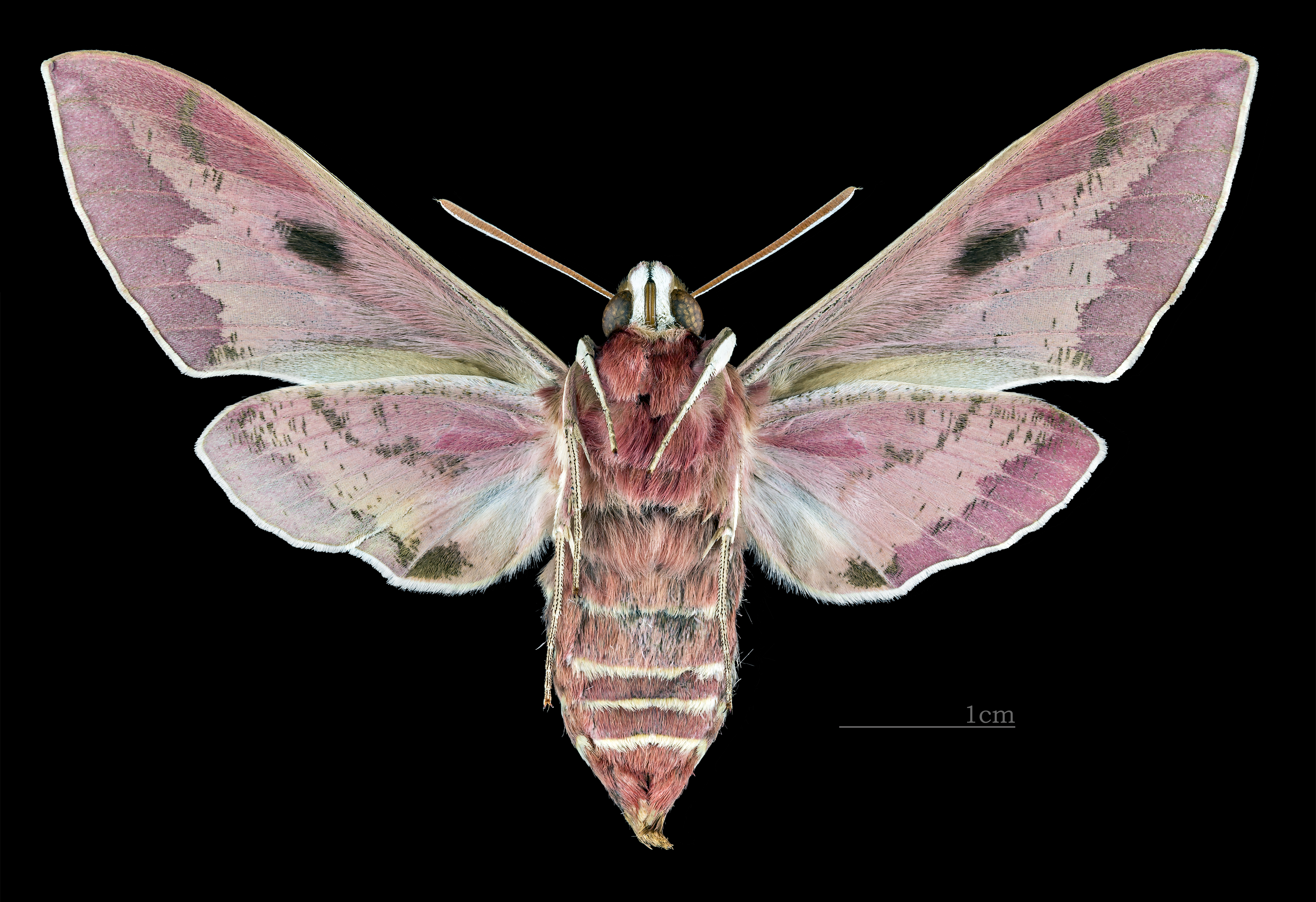
Female underside

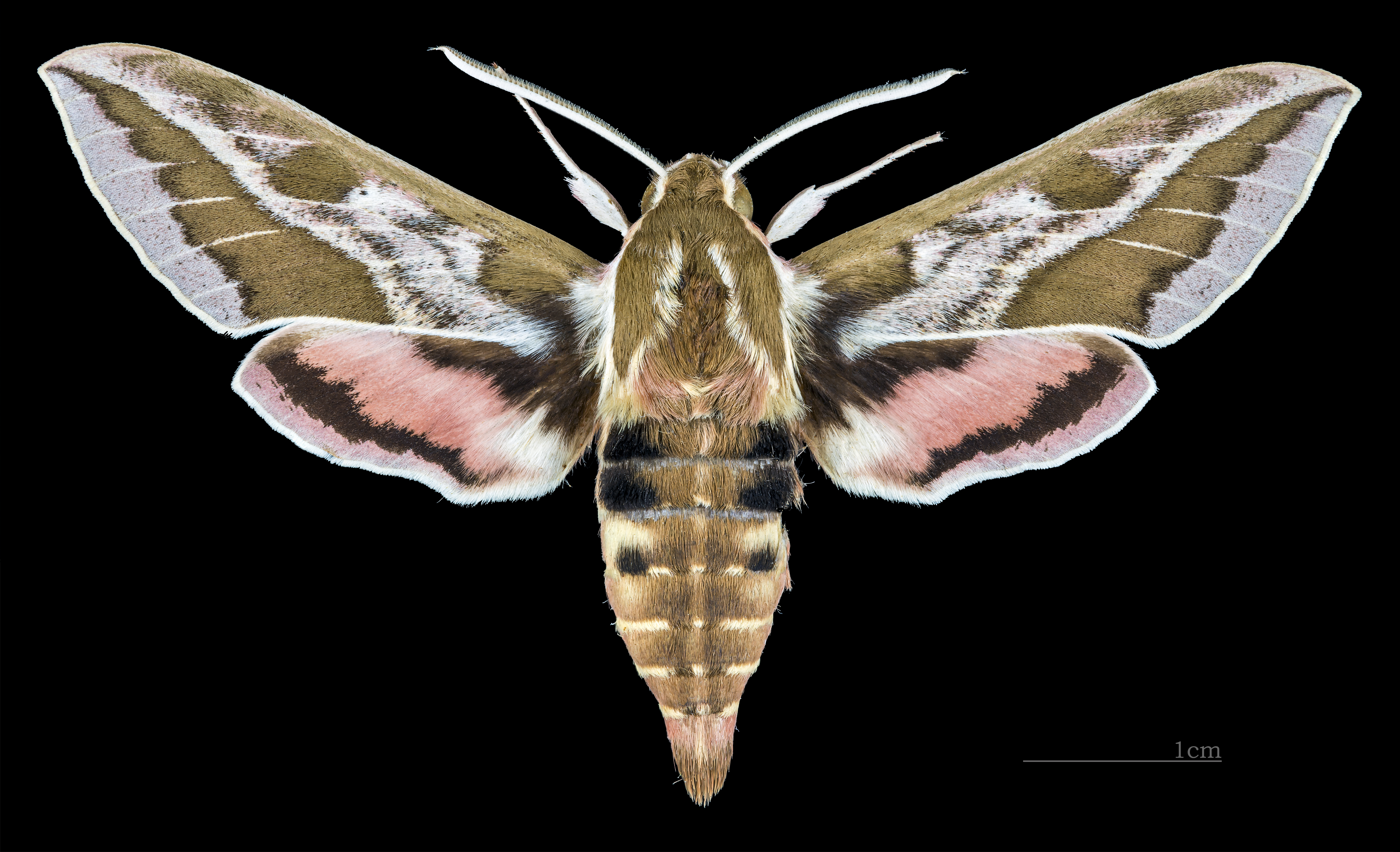
Male

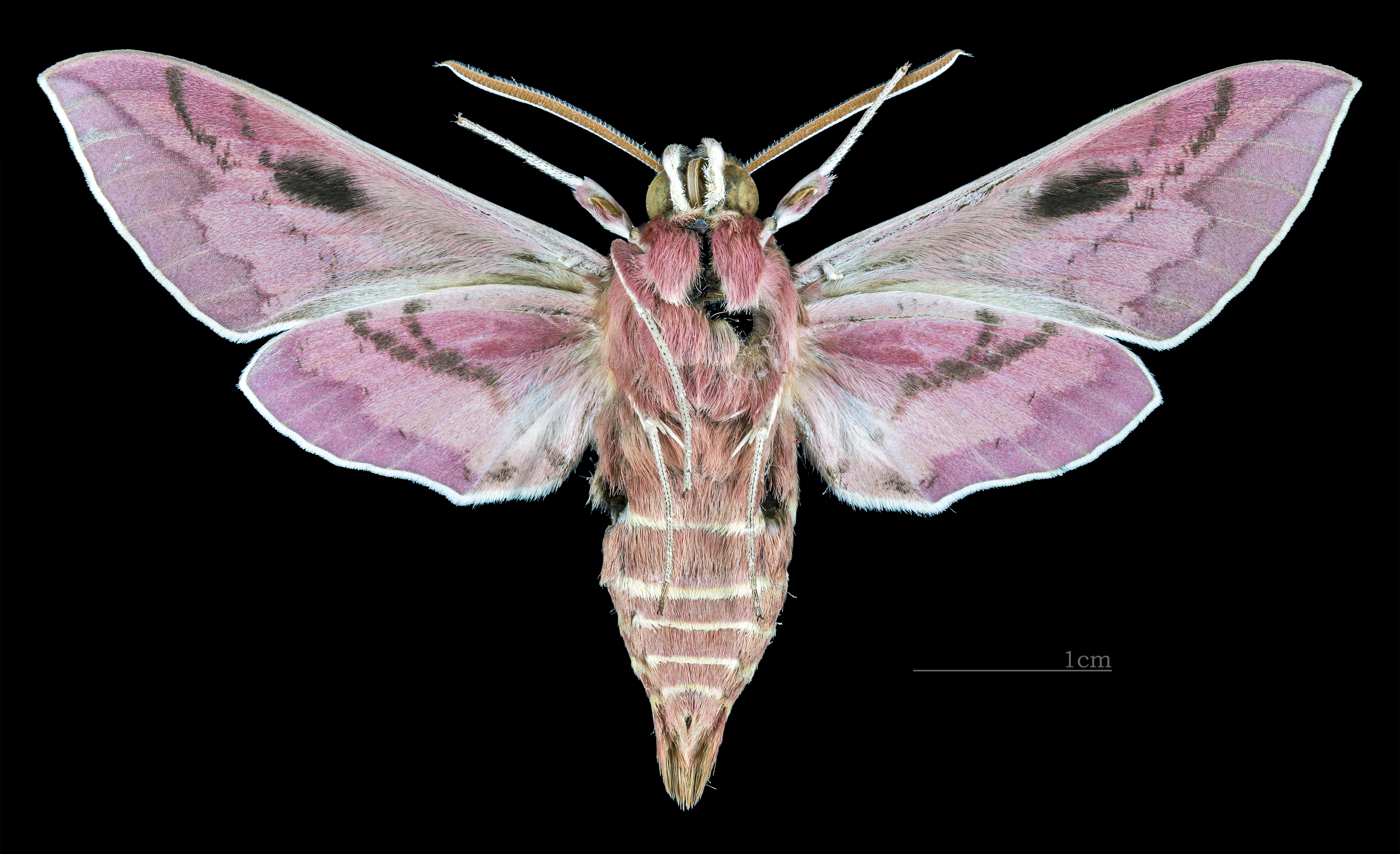
Male underside

== Biology ==
Adults are on wing from May to June and from August to September in two generations. The larvae feed on various herbaceous plants, including Euphorbia paralias, Euphorbia myrsinites, Euphorbia characias, Euphorbia dendroides, Euphorbia pithyusa, Euphorbia pinea and Euphorbia terracina.
