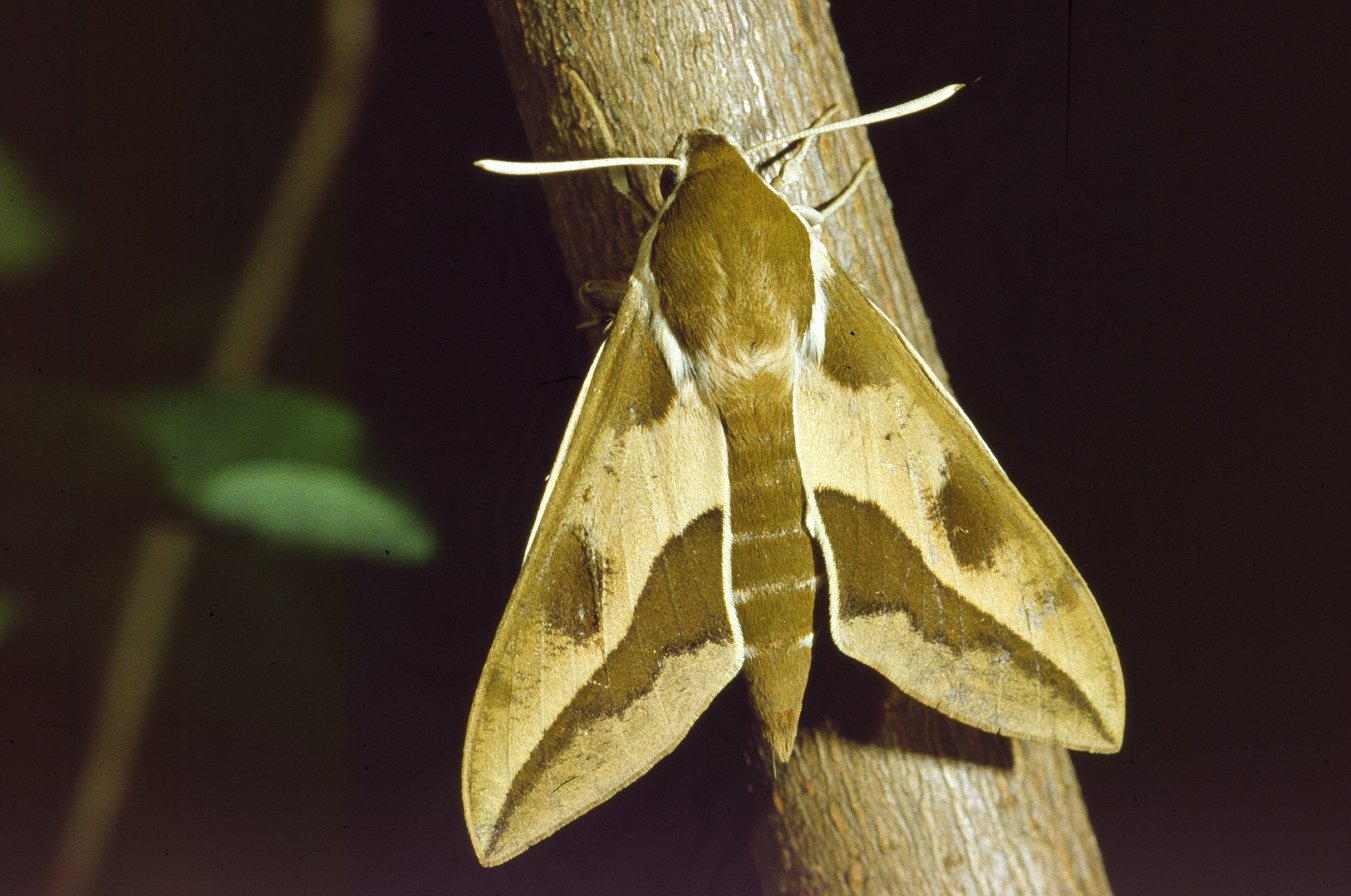
- Adult
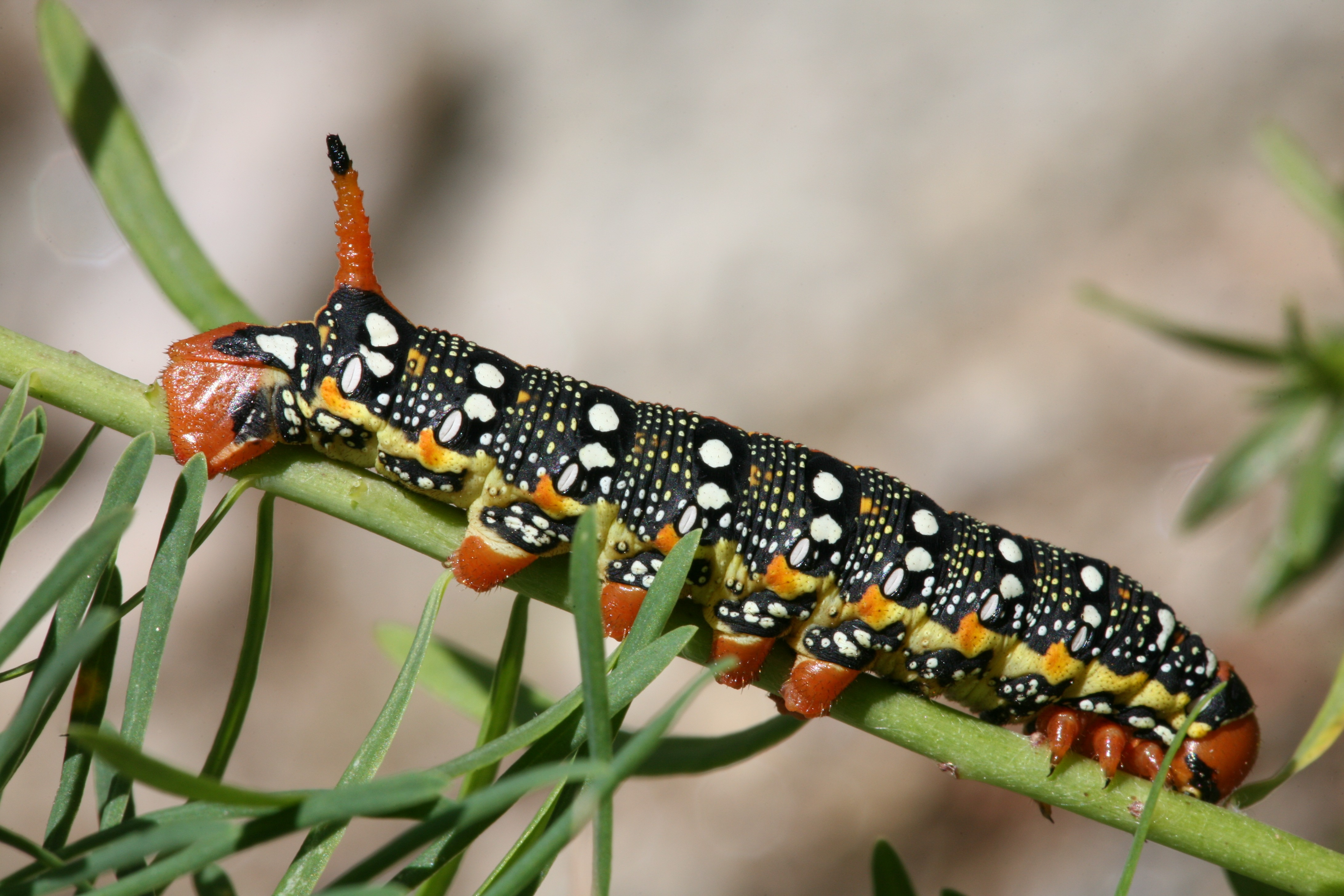
- Larva

Scientific classification
- Kingdom: Animalia
- Phylum: Arthropoda
- Class: Insecta
- Order: Lepidoptera
- Family: Sphingidae
- Genus: Hyles
- Species: H. euphorbiae

Binomial name
- Hyles euphorbiae (Linnaeus, 1758)

Synonyms
- List: Sphinx euphorbiae Linnaeus, 1758; Sphinx esulae Hufnagel, 1766; Deilephila esulae Boisduval, 1834; Celerio euphorbiae conspicua Rothschild & Jordan, 1903; Celerio euphorbiae giganteomaculata Gehlen, 1930; Celerio euphorbiae nigrofasciata Igel, 1928; Celerio euphorbiae decolorata (Closs, 1913); Celerio euphorbiae cyparissiae Schultz, 1903; Celerio euphorbiae cyanea Wladasch, 1929; Celerio euphorbiae conspicuata Bandermann, 1926; Celerio euphorbiae confusa (Wladasch, 1939); Celerio euphorbiae clossi Hannemann, 1917; Celerio euphorbiae cleopatra (Wladasch, 1931); Celerio euphorbiae clementiae Bayard, 1928; Celerio euphorbiae canarina Wladasch, 1924; Celerio euphorbiae caecigena Bandermann, 1924; Celerio euphorbiae brunnescens Schultz, 1904; Celerio euphorbiae bilinea Schultz, 1904; Celerio euphorbiae bandermanni Wladasch, 1933; Celerio euphorbiae atrolimbata Dannehl, 1929; Celerio euphorbiae argustana Bandermann, 1928; Celerio euphorbiae apiciplaga Gehlen, 1930; Celerio euphorbiae annellata Closs, 1915; Celerio euphorbiae angustefasciata (Villarrubia, 1974); Celerio euphorbiae ancestralis (Wladasch, 1939); Celerio euphorbiae albicans (Closs, 1917); Celerio euphorbiae demaculata Schultz, 1911; Celerio euphorbiae dolomiticola Stauder, 1930; Celerio euphorbiae effuscata (Wladasch, 1939); Celerio euphorbiae elliana Bandermann, 1917; Celerio euphorbiae ernata Bandermann, 1928; Celerio euphorbiae farinata (Wladasch, 1931); Celerio euphorbiae filapjewi O. Bang-Haas, 1936; Celerio euphorbiae flaveola Bandermann, 1928; Celerio euphorbiae flavidior Sohn-Rethel, 1929; Celerio euphorbiae galiata Bandermann, 1934; Celerio euphorbiae grentzenbergi-ziczac Wladasch, 1929; Celerio euphorbiae grisea (Closs, 1911); Celerio euphorbiae grisearubea-saumoneae Wladasch, 1933; Celerio euphorbiae griseonympha Bandermann, 1924; Celerio euphorbiae heliophila (Wladasch, 1941); Celerio euphorbiae ilia Bandermann, 1928; Celerio euphorbiae incarnate Wladasch, 1929; Celerio euphorbiae jachani (Closs, 1921); Celerio euphorbiae krombachi (Closs, 1917); Celerio euphorbiae latefasciata (Vilarrubia, 1974); Celerio euphorbiae latefasciata Schultz, 1911; Celerio euphorbiae lilacina Wladasch, 1929; Celerio euphorbiae lucida Derzhavets, 1980; Celerio euphorbiae minor (Vilarrubia, 1974); Celerio euphorbiae multicolor (Wladasch, 1931); Celerio euphorbiae nebulosa Gehlen, 1930; Celerio euphorbiae nigerrima Gehlen, 1930; Celerio euphorbiae nigra Gehlen, 1932; Celerio euphorbiae nigrescens Rothschild & Jordan, 1903; Celerio euphorbiae nigricans Closs, 1917; Celerio euphorbiae nymphaea Bandermann, 1928; Celerio euphorbiae olivacea (Closs, 1917); Celerio euphorbiae pallida Closs, 1913; Celerio euphorbiae perfulva Schultz, 1911; Celerio euphorbiae philippsi Bandermann, 1929; Celerio euphorbiae restricta Rothschild & Jordan, 1903; Celerio euphorbiae roseata Bandermann, 1931; Celerio euphorbiae rothschildi Stauder, 1928; Celerio euphorbiae rubescens-mediofasciata-olivacea Wladasch, 1933; Celerio euphorbiae rudolfi Bandermann, 1924; Celerio euphorbiae rufomelana Tutt, 1904; Celerio euphorbiae rühlii Bandermann, 1915; Celerio euphorbiae silesiana Wladasch, 1924; Celerio euphorbiae sinensis Closs, 1917; Celerio euphorbiae strasillai Stauder, 1921; Celerio euphorbiae suarezi Agenjo, 1952; Celerio euphorbiae subiacensis Dannehl, 1929; Celerio euphorbiae subvittata Schultz, 1911; Celerio euphorbiae suffusa Tutt, 1904; Celerio euphorbiae sulphurata Bandermann, 1925; Celerio euphorbiae testata Wladasch, 1929; Celerio euphorbiae typica-latifolei Wladasch, 1929; Celerio euphorbiae umbrata Gehlen, 1929; Celerio euphorbiae unimacula Closs, 1915; Celerio euphorbiae vandalusica Ribbe, 1910; Celerio euphorbiae variegata Closs, 1913; Celerio euphorbiae viereckana Bandermann, 1928; Celerio euphorbiae vinacea-reducta (Wladasch, 1941); Celerio euphorbiae virescens Gehlen, 1930; Celerio euphorbiae viverina (Denso, 1908); Celerio euphorbiae zableri Bandermann, 1934; Celerio euphorbiae ziczac Fritsch, 1912; Deilephila euphorbiae aczeli Bezsilla, 1943; Deilephila euphorbiae coniuncta Lütkemeyer, 1920; Deilephila euphorbiae cuspidata Rebel, 1908; Deilephila euphorbiae defecta Bartel, 1902; Deilephila euphorbiae etrusca Verity, 1911; Deilephila euphorbiae grentzenbergi Staudinger, 1885; Deilephila euphorbiae helioscopiae (de Selys-Longchamp, 1857); Deilephila euphorbiae krancheri Bandermann, 1916; Deilephila euphorbiae lafitolii Thierry-Mieg, 1889; Deilephila euphorbiae mediofasciata Mayer, 1907; Deilephila euphorbiae mosana Lambillion, 1908; Deilephila euphorbiae nigerrima Sälzl, 1924; Deilephila euphorbiae oberthueri Bandermann, 1931; Deilephila euphorbiae paralias Nickerl, 1837; Deilephila euphorbiae rubescens Garbowski, 1892; Hyles euphorbiae gönneri Bandermann, 1915

= Hyles euphorbiae =

Spurge hawk-moth

Species of moth

Hyles euphorbiae, the spurge hawk-moth, is a European moth of the family Sphingidae. This hawk moth is used as an agent of biological pest control against the noxious weed leafy spurge (Euphorbia virgata), but usually only in conjunction with other agents. The larvae consume the leaves and bracts of the plant. The species was first described by Carl Linnaeus in his 1758 10th edition of Systema Naturae.

== Description ==
The Spurge Hawk-Moth - Fore wings grey, with an almost square olive-brown blotch; at the base another olive-brown blotch near the middle, and a long oblique band of the same colour, commencing in a point at the extreme apex of the wing, and gradually growing wider until it reaches the margin, where it is very broad: hind wings pink, with a black blotch at the base, and a black band half-way between this black blotch and the margin, and a snowy-white blotch at the anal angle: thorax and body olive-brown, with a white line on each side of the thorax just at the base of the wings; this line runs on each side along the head just above the eye, and the two meet at the nose; the body has on each side at the base two square black spots and two square white spots, and beyond them, nearer the apex, and also on each side, are three white lines.

The caterpillar is smooth and black, with innumerable whitish dots; there are also eleven large spots of the same colour arrayed in a row on each side of the back, and beneath these as many spots of the same size and of a bright coral-red colour; the head is of the same coral-red colour, and a line of the same colour runs all along the back, from the head to the horn; the horn is red at the base and black at the tip. It feeds on sea-spurge.

The chrysalis is pale brown and delicately lined and dotted with black in the manner of network; it buries itself in the loose dry sand on the sea coast.

The eggs are covered with liquid gum, which enables them to stick on the small leaves of the spurge. In a fortnight these hatch and produce little black caterpillars; the white and red spots appear as the caterpillar increases in size, and in a few weeks it becomes a most beautiful object, and so conspicuous as to attract the sea-gulls and terns, which devour them in numbers. We have never had the pleasure of finding either the caterpillar or perfect moth. Our description of the caterpillar is taken from the Entomological Magazine.

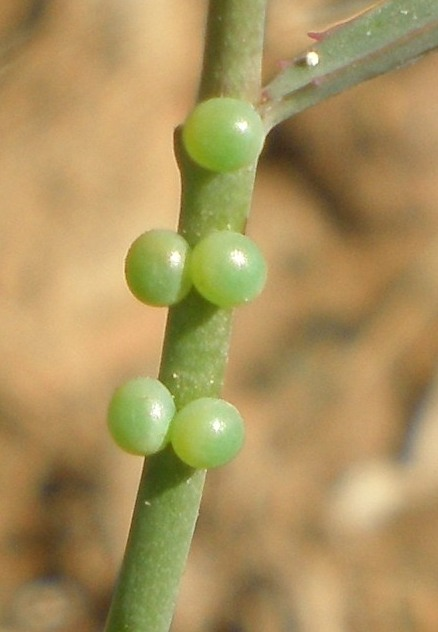
Egg

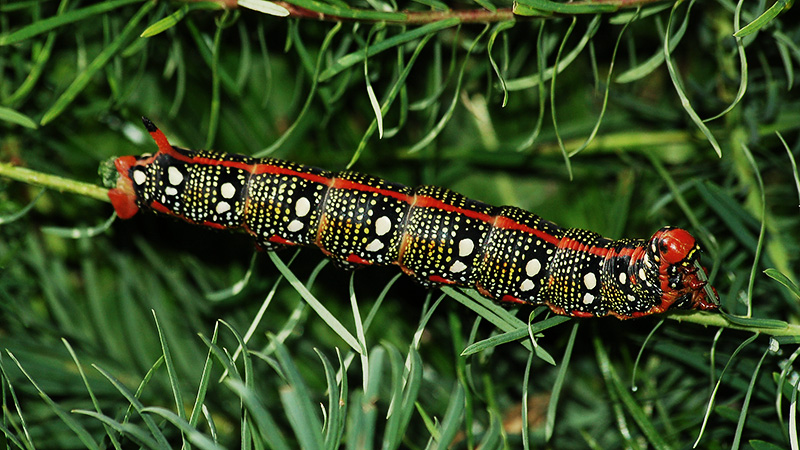
Larva

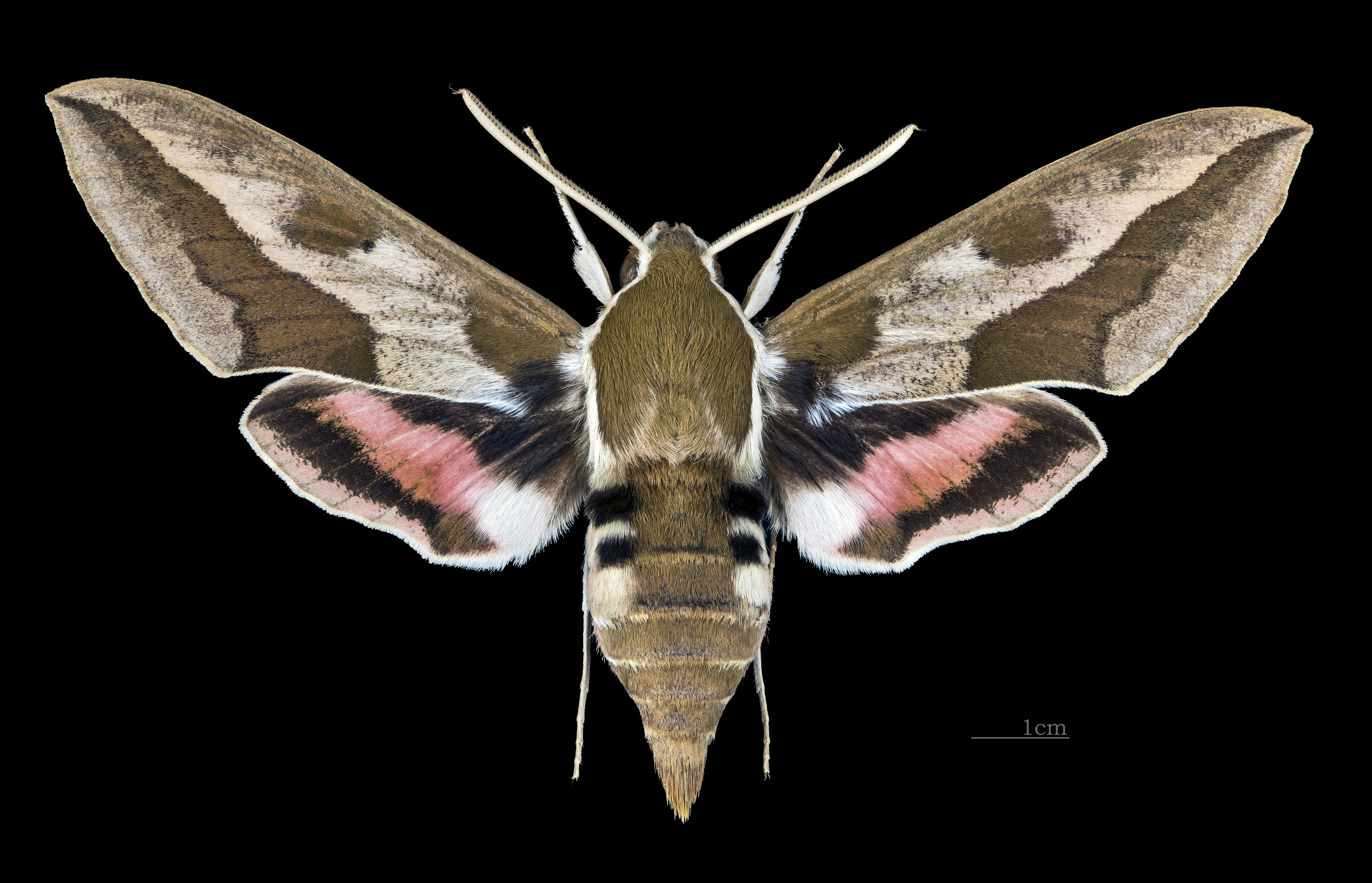
Male, dorsal side

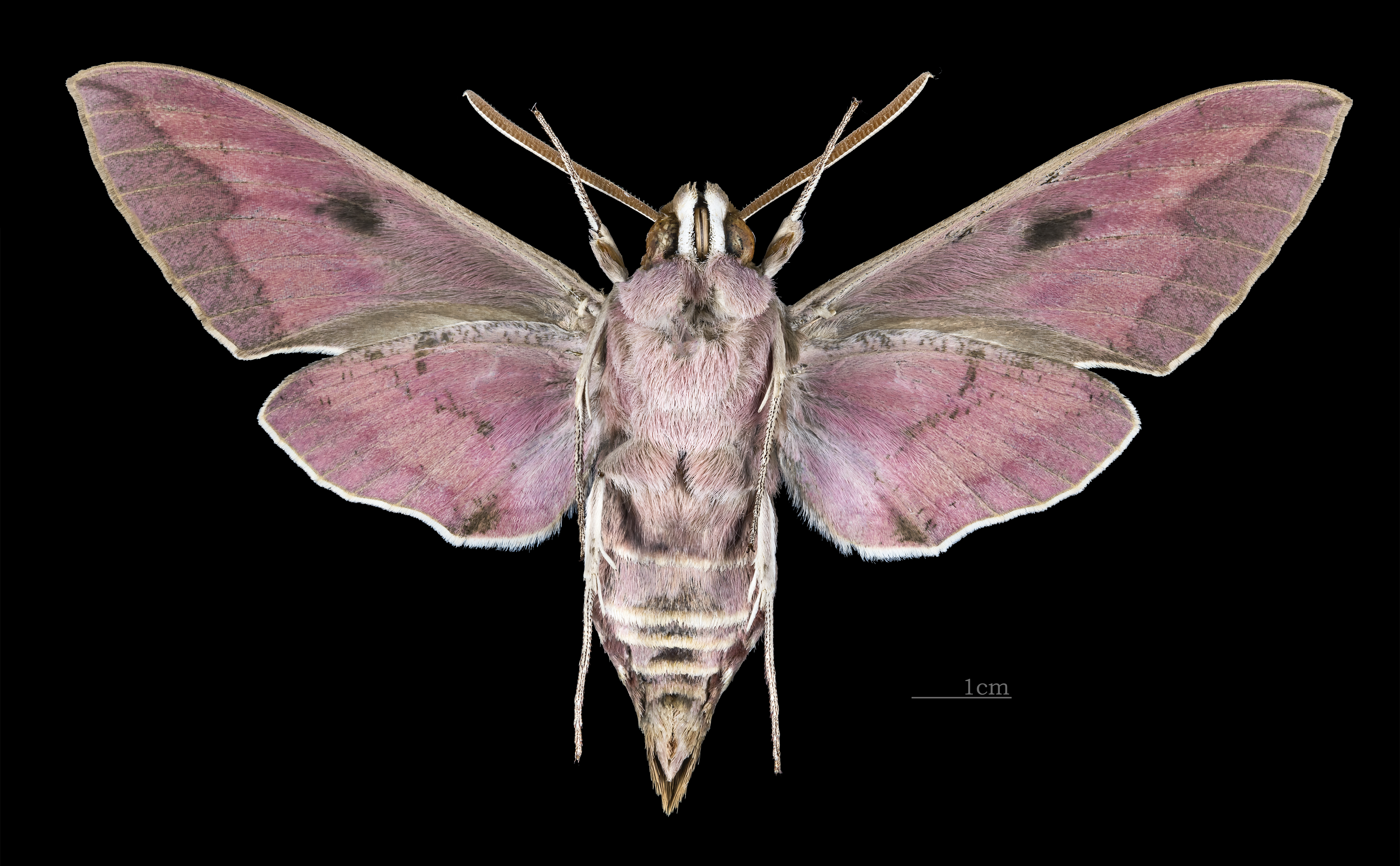
Male, ventral side

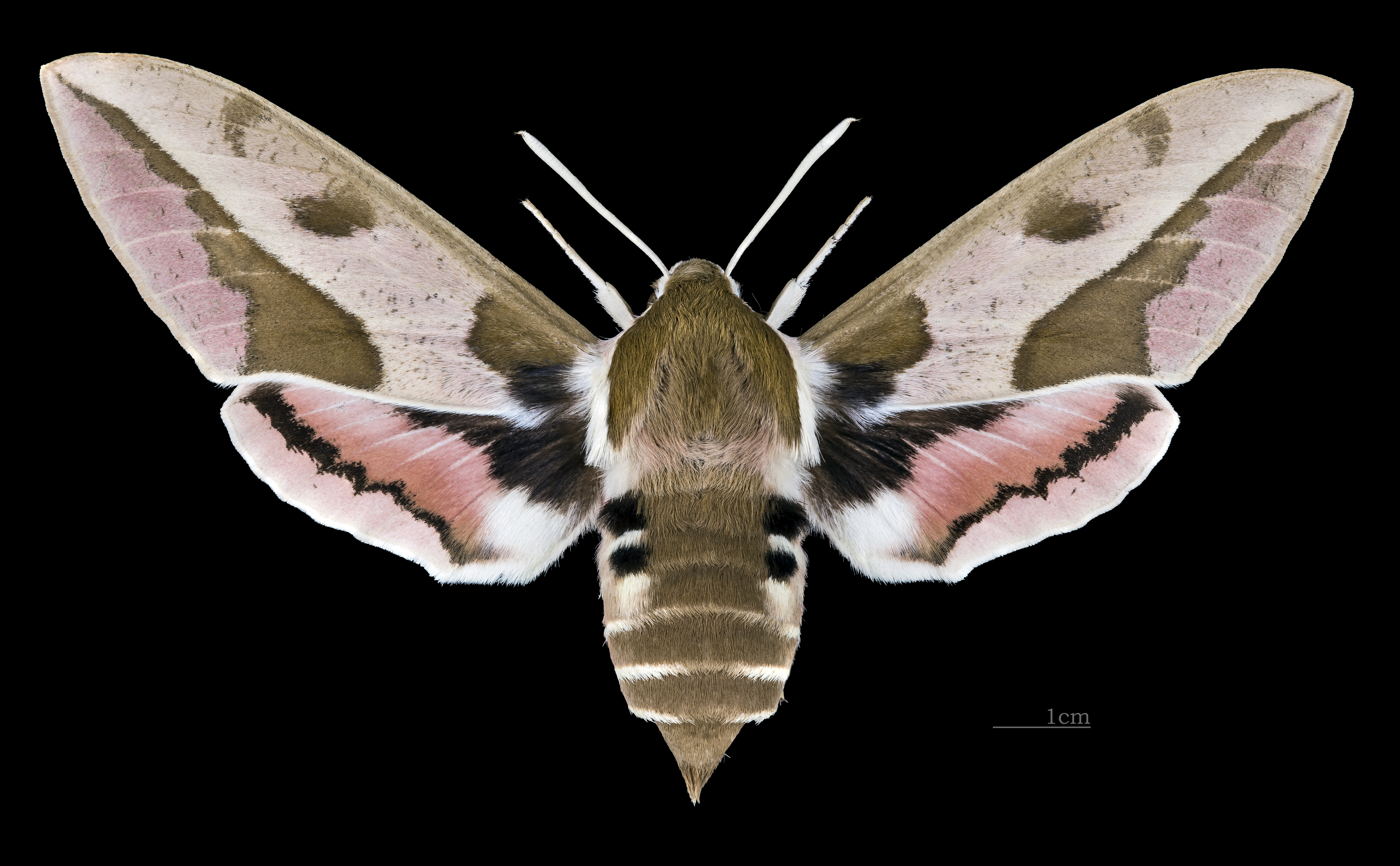
Female, dorsal side

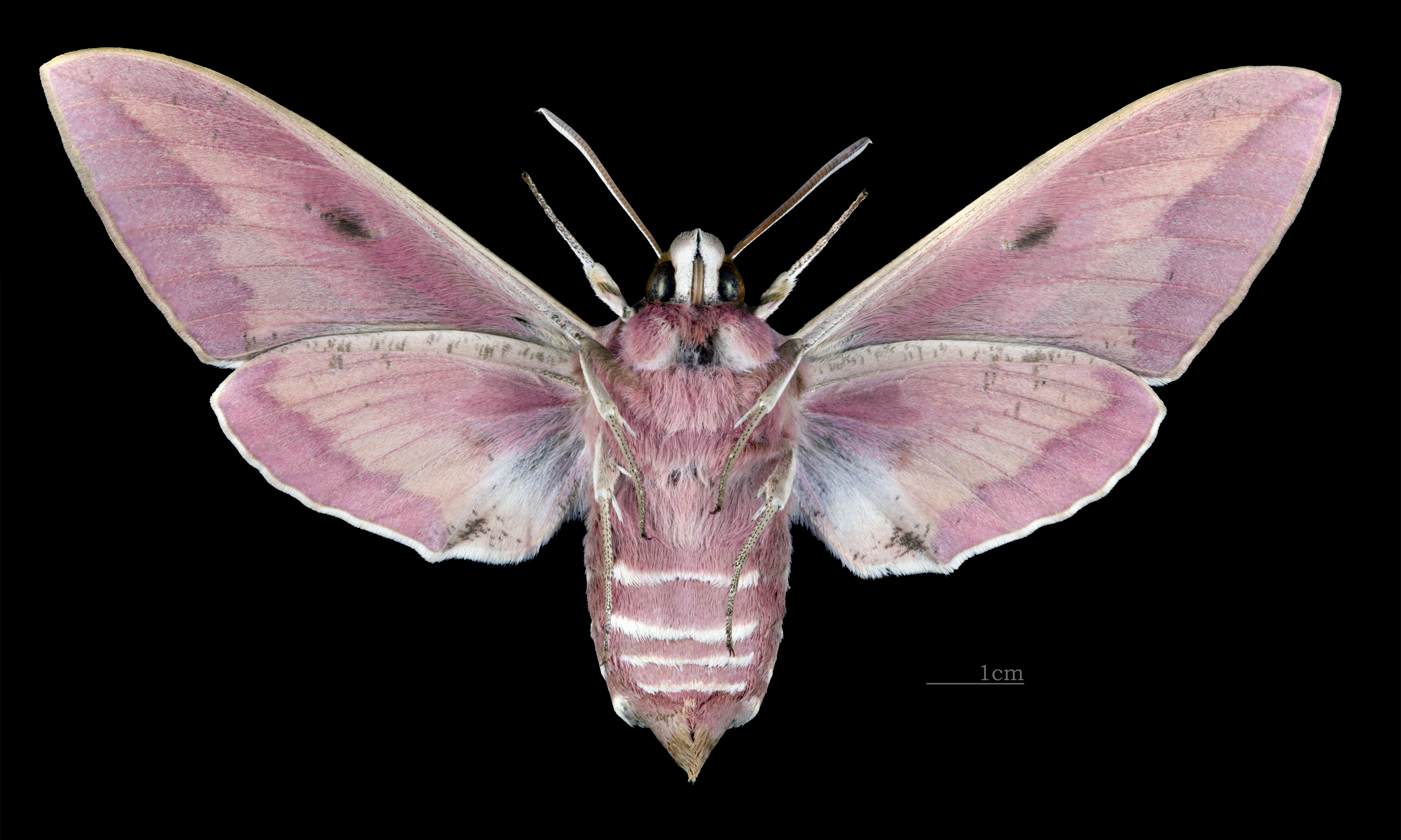
Female, ventral side

== Subspecies ==
- Hyles euphorbiae euphorbiae
- Hyles euphorbiae conspicua (Rothschild & Jordan, 1903) (Middle East)
